= Szybowcowy Zakład Doświadczalny =

Polish glider design and research centre

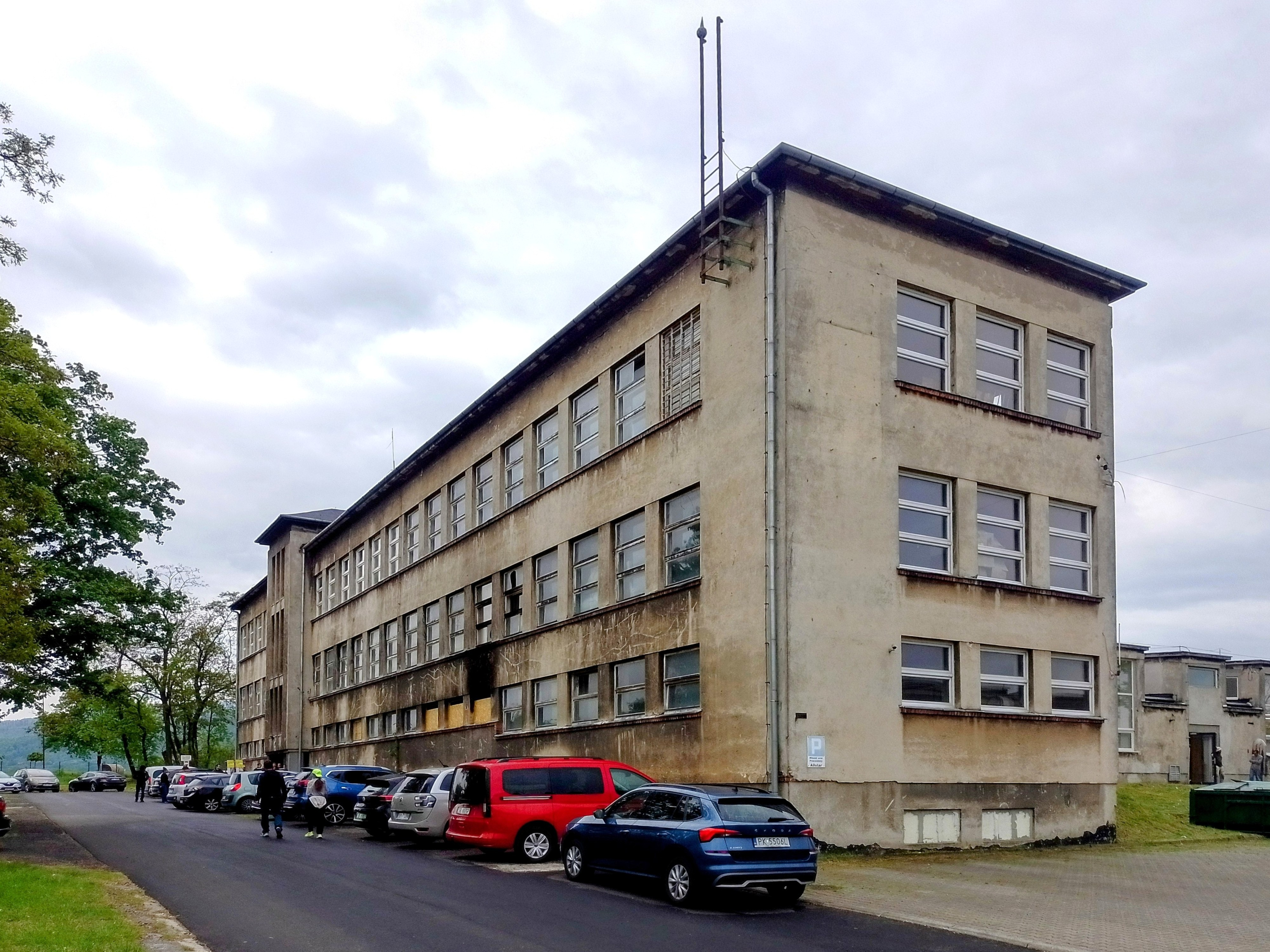
Headquarters in Bielsko-Biała

Szybowcowy Zakład Doświadczalny (SZD), Glider Experimental Works was a glider design and research centre of the Polish aerospace industry after World War II, located in Bielsko-Biała. Through its history it underwent many organizational and name changes, among others in 1946-1948 it was Instytut Szybownictwa. After 1969 it existed under other names, but an abbreviation SZD continued to be used on designs. The SZD gliders themselves were produced in the production centre in Bielsko-Biała, organized around the SZD (from 1990s named PZL-Bielsko), and by several other works of the state aerospace industry and didn't bear specific manufacturer's names.

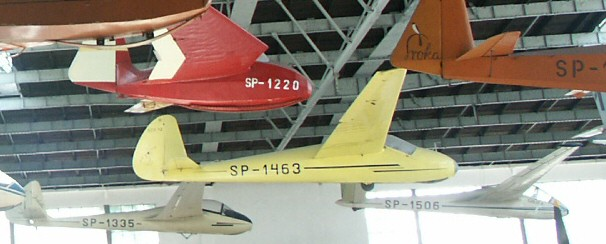
SZD-6X, SZD-15, SZD-12, SZD-8, SZD-17X

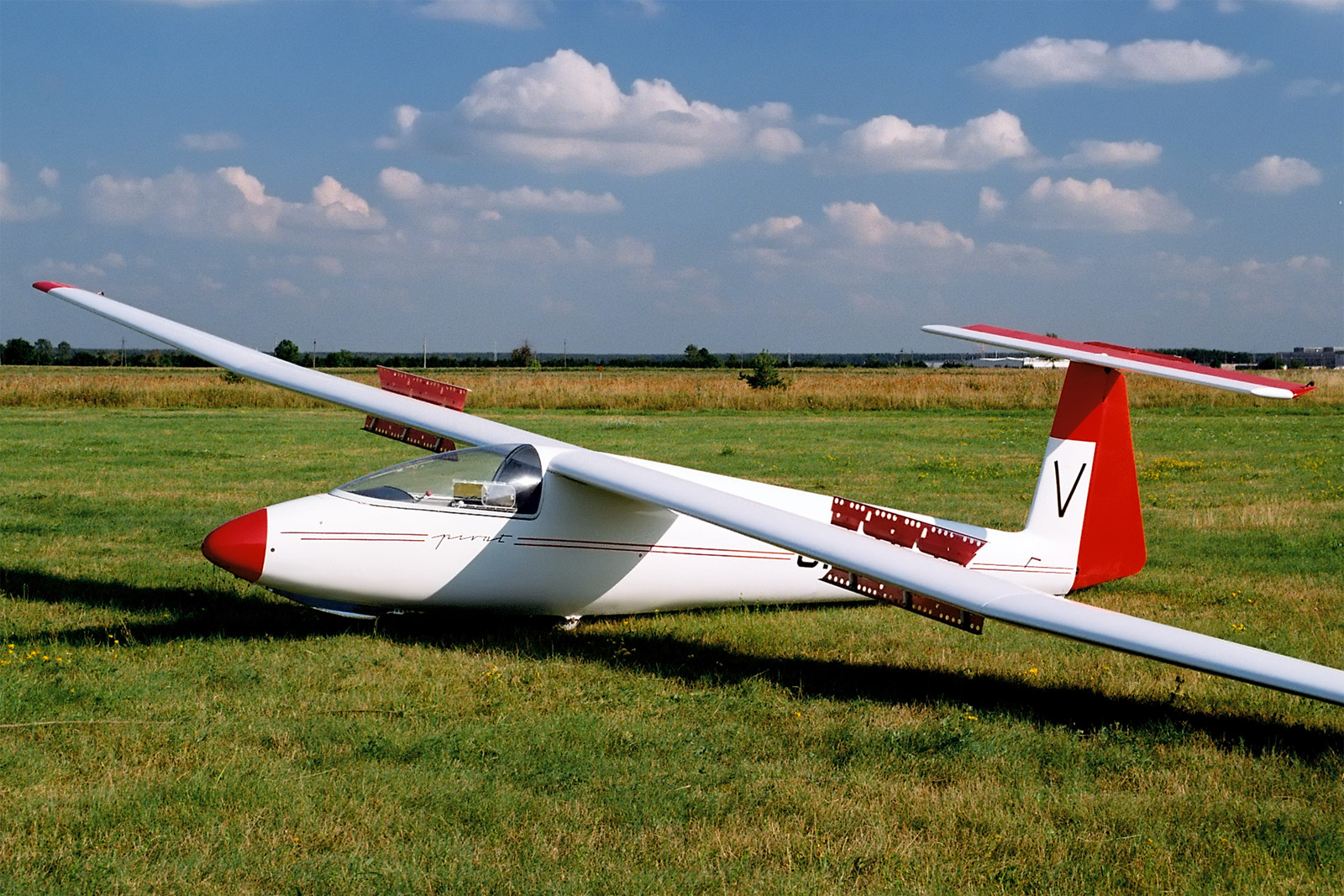
SZD-30 Pirat

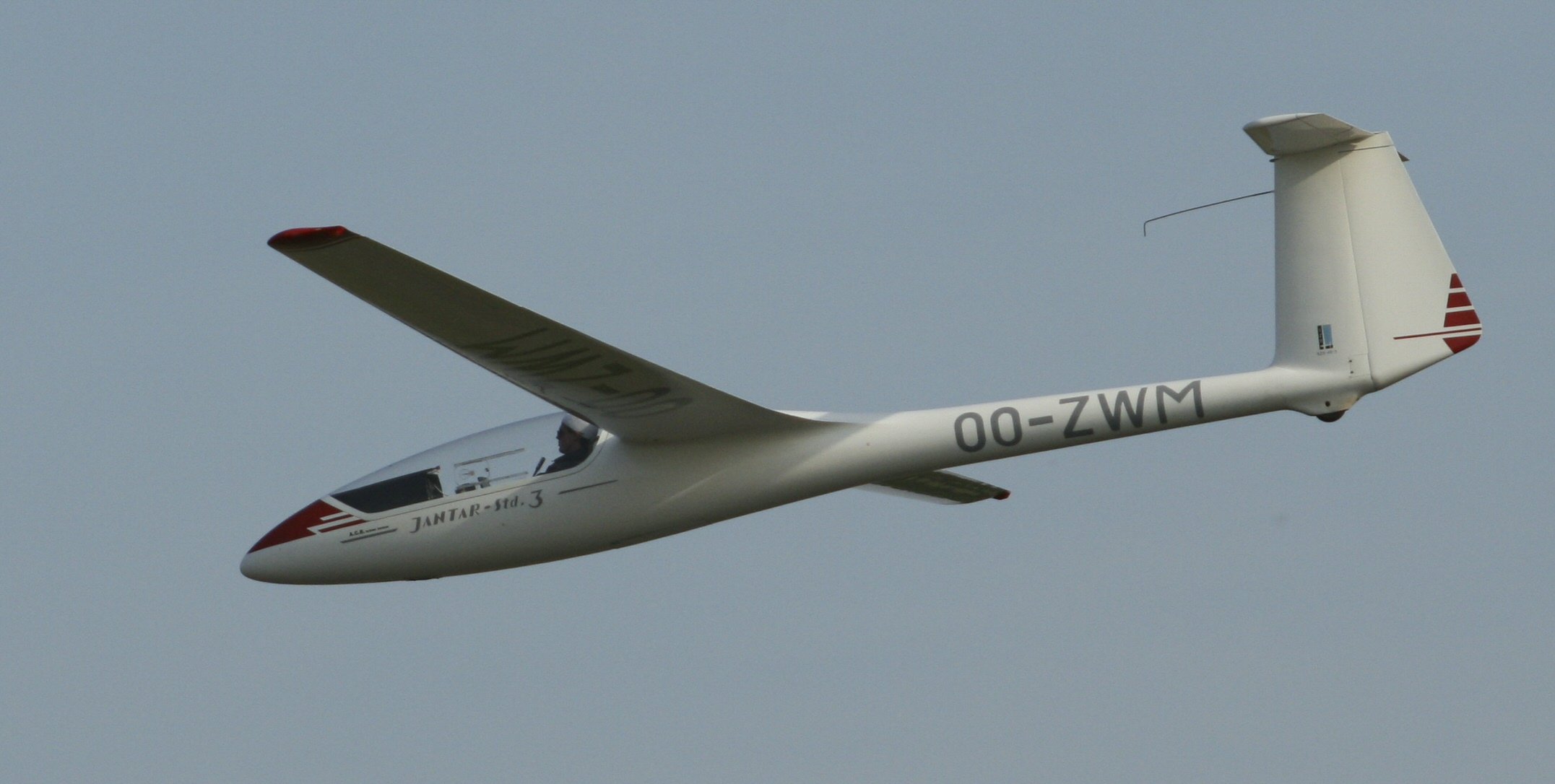
SZD-48 Jantar Standard 3

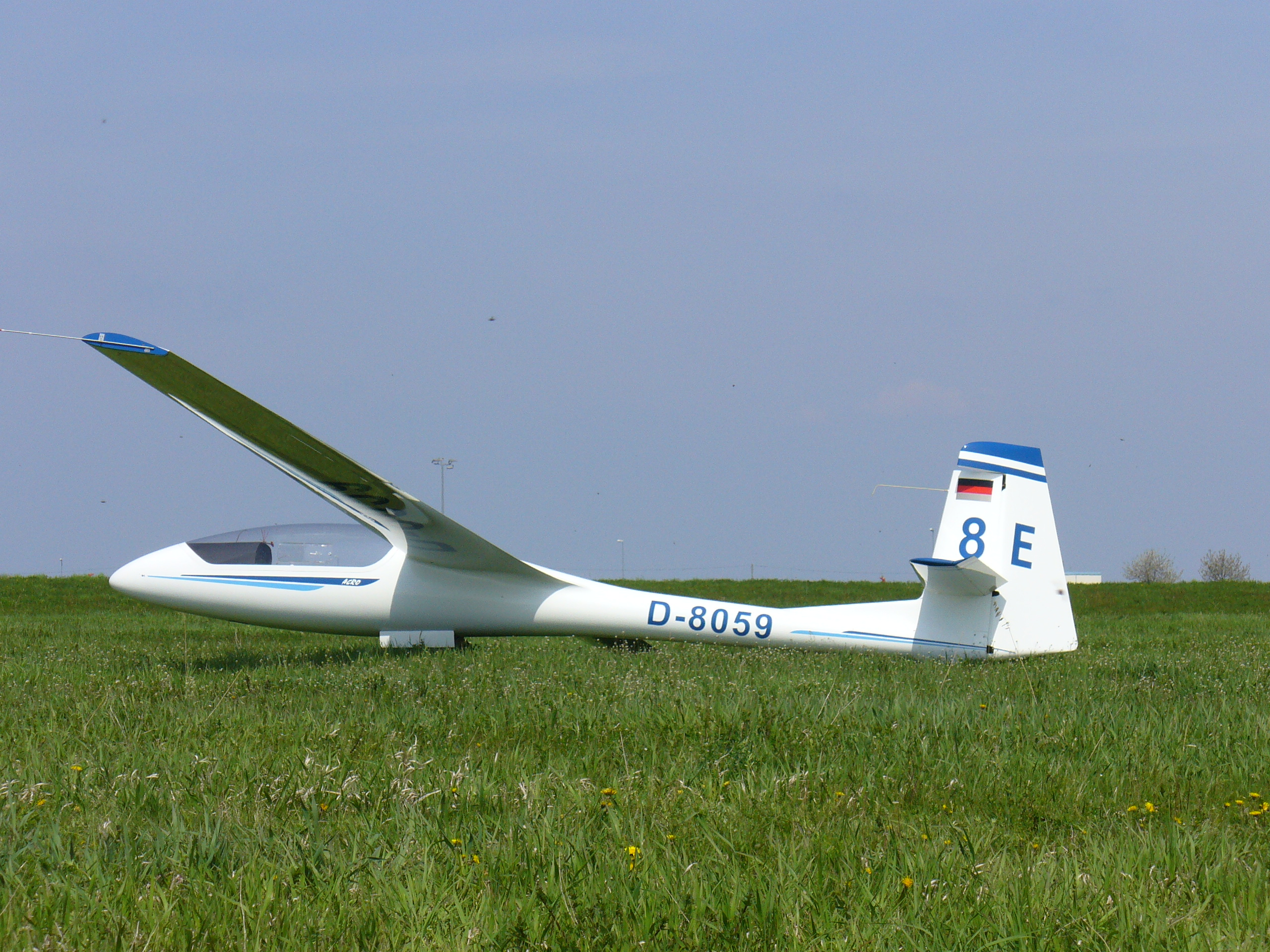
SZD-59 Acro

== Beginnings ==
Just after World War II, which destroyed most of Polish pre-war gliders and - more importantly - their production blueprints, the Main Scouts' Gliding Centre (Centralny Harcerski Ośrodek Szybowcowy) was created in Bielsko-Biała in May 1945, by the Ministry of Communications. In autumn 1945 it was re-organized into the Gliding Organizational Centre (Ośrodek Organizacji Szybownictwa), and in January 1946, into the Gliding Institute (Instytut Szybownictwa, IS). It inherited tasks and traditions of the pre-war Gliding and Motor gliding Institute in Lwów. It consisted of Training Division, Technical Division and Experimental Workshops. As more organizations took on gliding training, the main task of the Institute became design work and technical research. In that period, several gliders were designed, under IS designation.

As a sign of new tasks, in 1948 the Gliding Institute was renamed to the Glider Experimental Works (Szybowcowy Zakład Doświadczalny), headed first by Władysław Nowakowski. It became the main Polish centre of designing gliders, which were next produced by the SZD workshops or, in conditions of a centrally planned state economy, by other state-owned workshops and factories.

== Organizational changes ==
In the early 1950s, the SZD was incorporated into a Sports Aviation Equipment Works Management (Zarząd Zakładów Sprzętu Lotnictwa Sportowego), as a design centre. The management also covered glider production works (ZSLS) in Jeżów (Grunau), Gdańsk-Wrzeszcz (until 1954), Poznań, Krosno and Wrocław (from 1956). In 1957 this management was subordinated to the Central Management of Communications Equipment Industry (later PZL Aerospace Industry Union).

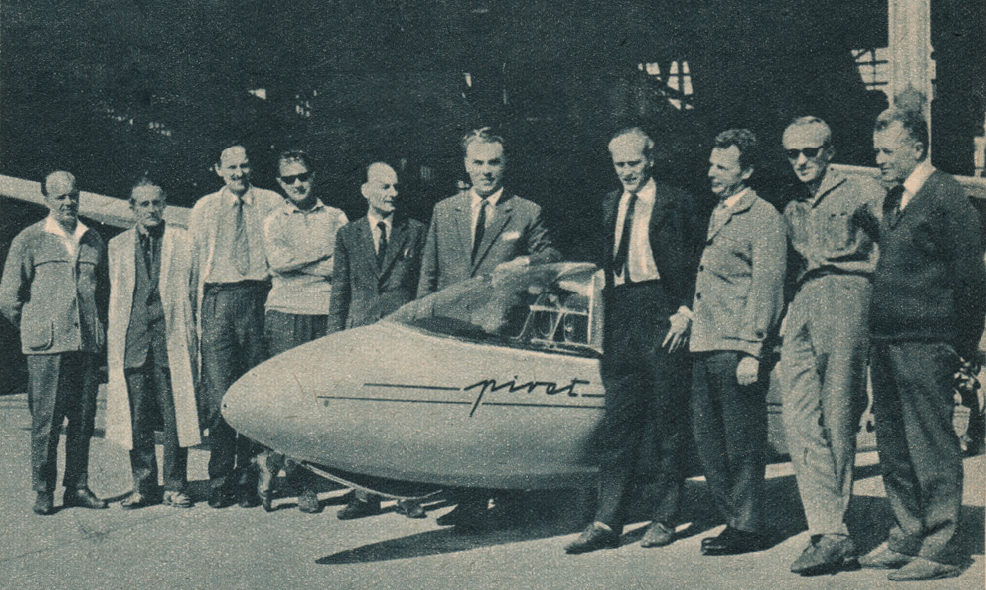
SZD constructors. From the left: Władysław Okarmus, Marian Gracz, Jan Dyrek, Jerzy Śmielkiewicz, Józef Niespał, Władysław Nowakowski, Zbigniew Badura, Jerzy Trzeciak, Bogumił Szuba and Roman Zatwarnicki

In 1963, Sports Aviation Equipment Works (Zakłady Sprzętu Lotnictwa Sportowego, ZSLS) was created in Bielsko-Biała, with the SZD as its main division. Works in Jeżów and Wrocław became its production divisions (works in Poznań and Krosno were excluded from the glider industry as separate Communication Equipment Factories - WSK). About 1969, the SZD was renamed to Glider Development and Construction Experimental Works (Zakład Doświadczalny Rozwoju i Budowy Szybowców), and in 1971 to Gliding Research and Development Centre (Ośrodek Badawczo-Rozwojowy Szybownictwa). Despite these changes, new designs were still marked with SZD letters. Around this time, works in Bielsko-Biała were enhanced.

== Designs and production ==
In 1946-1972 only, the Polish centralized glider industry, focussed around the SZD, produced 2743 gliders, of which 1167 were exported (starting from 1951), 367 of which to Western countries. In 1973 series production of laminate gliders started.

- SZD-C Żuraw Crane
- SZD-6x Nietoperz (Bat)
- SZD-7 Osa (Wasp)
- SZD-8 Jaskółka (Swallow)
- SZD-9 Bocian (Stork)
- SZD-10 Czapla (Heron)
- SZD-11 Albatros (Albatross)
- SZD-12 Mucha 100 (Fly 100)
- SZD-13 Wampir (Vampire)
- SZD-14x Jaskółka M (Swallow M)
- SZD-15 Sroka (Magpie)
- SZD-16 Gil (Bullfinch)
- SZD-17x Jaskółka L (Swallow L)
- SZD-18 Czajka (Lapwing)
- SZD-19 Zefir (Zephyr)
- SZD-20x Wampir 2 (Vampire)
- SZD-21 Kobuz (Lerche Falcon)
- SZD-22 Mucha Standard (Fly Standard)
- SZD-23 Bocian 2 (Stork 2)
- SZD-24 Foka (Seal)
- SZD-25 Lis (Fox)
- SZD-26 Wilk (Wolf)
- SZD-27 Kormoran (Cormorant)
- SZD-28 Latające laboratorium / Kondor (Flying Laboratory / Condor)
- SZD-29 Zefir 3 (Zephyr 3)
- SZD-30 Pirat (Pirate)
- SZD-31 Zefir 4 (Zephyr 4)
- SZD-32A Foka 5 (Seal 5)
- SZD-33 Bocian 3 (Stork)
- SZD-34 Bocian 3 (Ver. 2) (Stork 3 ver.2)
- SZD-35 Bekas (Snipe)
- SZD-36 Cobra 15 (Cobra)
- SZD-37x Jantar (Amber)
- SZD-38 Jantar 1 (Amber)
- SZD-39 Cobra 17 (Cobra 17)
- SZD-40x Halny (Föhn)
- SZD-41 Jantar Standard (Amber Standard)
- SZD-42 Jantar 2/2b (Amber 2/2b)
- SZD-43 Orion
- SZD-45 Ogar (Bloodhound)
- SZD-48 Jantar Standard 2 (Amber Standard 2 and 3)
- SZD-49 Jantar K (Amber K)
- SZD-50 Puchacz (Eagle owl)
- SZD-51 Junior (Junior)
- SZD-52
- SZD-54 Perkoz (Grebe)
- SZD-55
- SZD-56 Diana
- SZD-59

== Continuation by Allstar PZL Glider ==
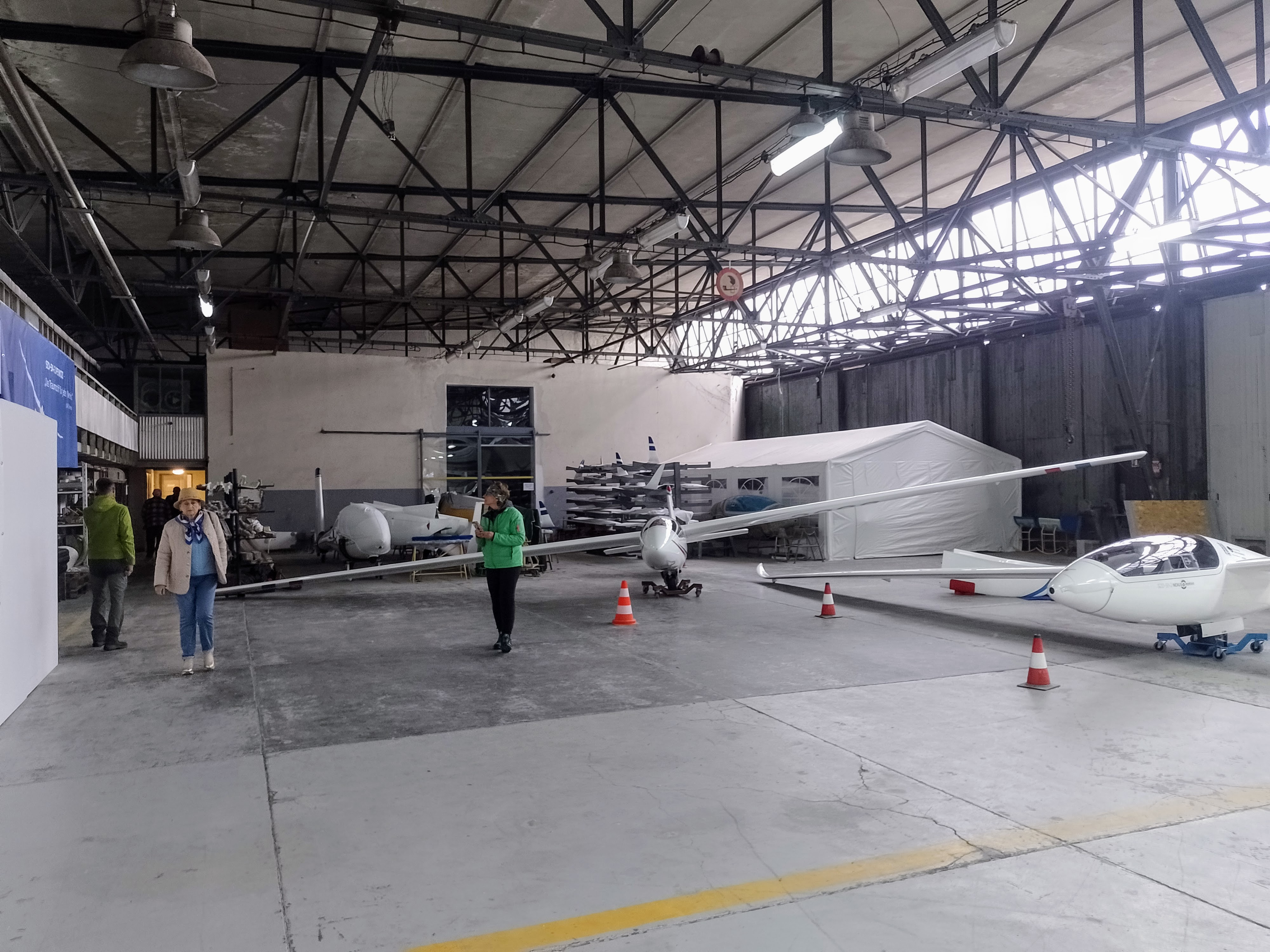
Hangar of Allstar PZL Glider (2025)

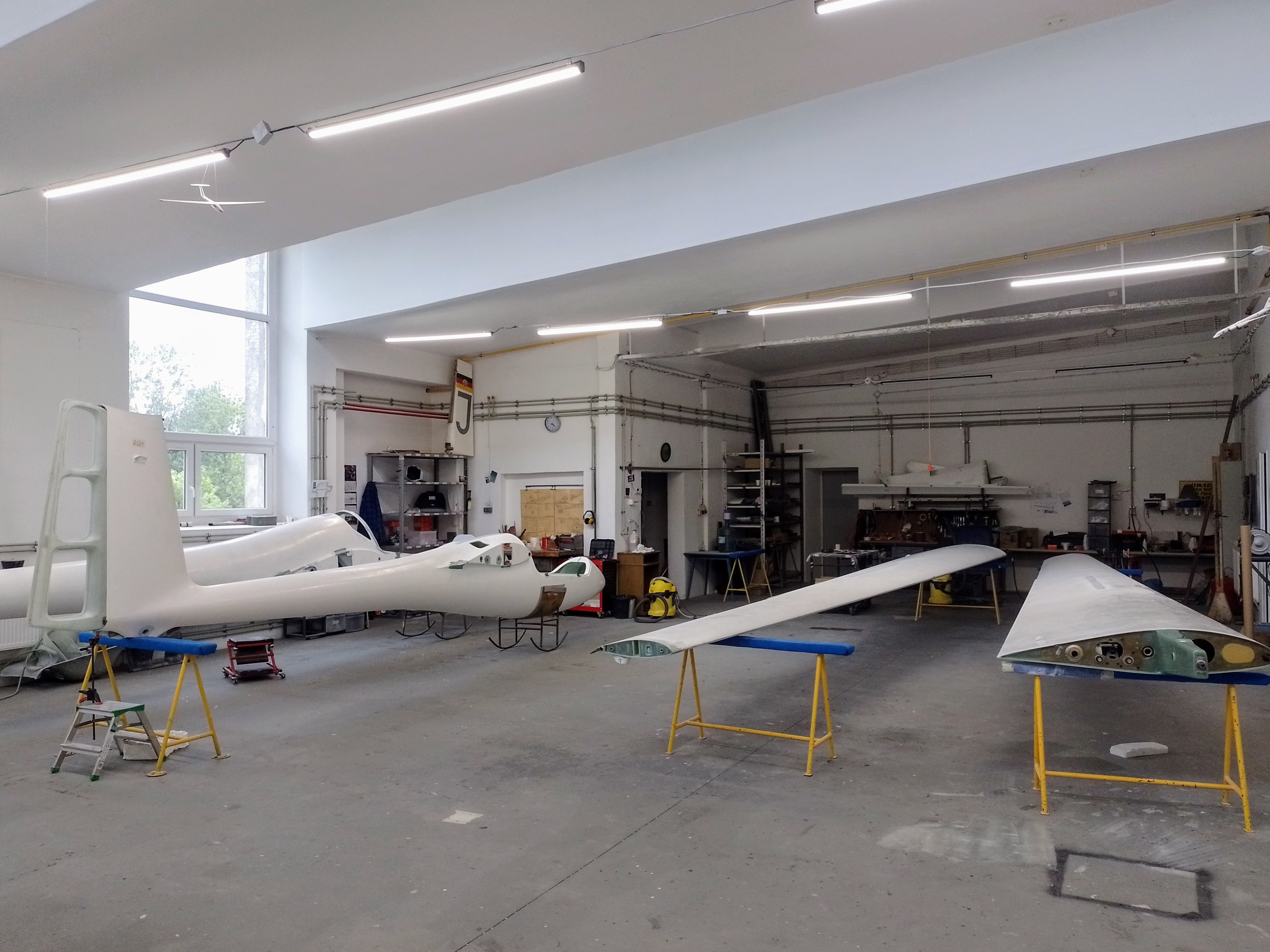
Production hall (2025)

After the end of communism in Poland, the glider production and design centre in Bielsko-Biała together with other production plants was renamed in the 1990s to a state-owned enterprise PZL-Bielsko (full name: Przedsiębiorstwo Doświadczalno-Produkcyjne Szybownictwa PZL-Bielsko). Plans for restructuring the company could not be brought to a successful end because it was liquidated in 2008.

In 2002 the main production plant in Bielsko and the design department was taken over by a company Allstar PZL Glider Sp.z o.o. The company now produces and develops several SZD gliders for aerobatics and cross-country:

- SZD-54-2 Perkoz - double-seater glider:
  wing span 17, 5 metres for aerobatics / wing span 17, 5 metres with winglets for training / wing span 20 metres for cross-country.
- SZD-59-1 Acro - single-seater glider:
  wing span 13,2 metres for aerobatics / wing span 15 metres for standard class / wing span 16,5 metres for cross-country.
- SZD-55-1 Nexus - single-seater glider:
  wing span 15 metres for competitive cross-country / optional with electric sustainer Allstar-e-motion.
- SZD-51-1 Junior - single-seater glider of club class for training.

In addition, the company holds the Type Certificates of the SZD-50-3 Puchacz and the SZD-48-3 Jantar Standard 3. The SZD-50-3 double-seater glider is not in production anymore. It has been replaced by the modern design of the double-seater SZD-54-2 Perkoz. The SZD-48-3 is the last model of the famous Jantar-series and the basis of the current SZD-59-1 Acro. Allstar PZL Glider produces and distributes the spare parts of all 6 glider models.

Since 2019 Allstar PZL Glider develops and produces electric propulsion systems for gliders under the name Allstar-e-motion. The proof-of-concept of the electric sustainer for the SZD-55 Nexus was first presented on the trade show AERO Friedrichshafen 2019.

Between 2005 and January 2007 there existed also different manufacturer with this name, PZL-Bielsko 1 Sp. z o.o. in Górki Wielkie, producing PW-5 gliders.
