= SZD-18 Czajka =

Polish single-seat glider, 1956

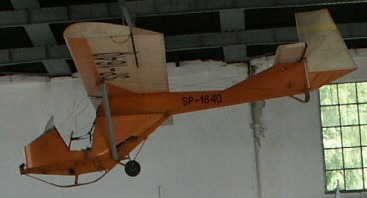
- SZD-18 Czajka at the Polish Aviation Museum

General information
- Type: Glider
- National origin: Poland
- Manufacturer: SZD
- Designer: Władysław Okarmus
- Status: in museum
- Number built: 1

History
- First flight: 30 November 1956
- Retired: 1966

The SZD-18 Czajka (Szybowcowy Zakład Doświadczalny - Glider Experimental Works) (Czajka in English: Lapwing) was a single-seat glider designed and built in Poland in 1956.

== Development ==
The last attempt by the LPŻ ( Liga Przyjaciół Żołnierza – Soldier's Friends League) paramilitary organization to design a single-seat training glider, after SZD-15 and SZD-16 designs, was the SZD-18 Czajka (lapwing), which appeared in 1956. It had a simple structure, box fuselage, strutted high wing and low performance typical for the primary type of training glider. The LPŻ held a competition in 1955 for the design of a new primary style single-seat trainer, which was won in March 1955 by the design by Tadeusz Grudzieński, named X-11. The prototype glider was constructed in the SZD in Bielsko by Władysław Okarmus, and designated SZD-18.

Flight trials began on 30 November 1956 (pilot Adam Zientek) proving, that the SZD-18 had good handling qualities and performance adequate for its intended role. It was regarded as one of the best gliders in its class and the Polish best training glider. However, the aero clubs, now independent of the LPŻ, rejected the single-seat training concept, moving towards the more conventional two-seat pupil/instructor method, which had been proven to be quicker, more efficient and safer. No production was carried out and the sole prototype (SP-1640) flew as a club glider with the Warsaw aero club until 1966, when it was given to the Polish Aviation Museum in Kraków.

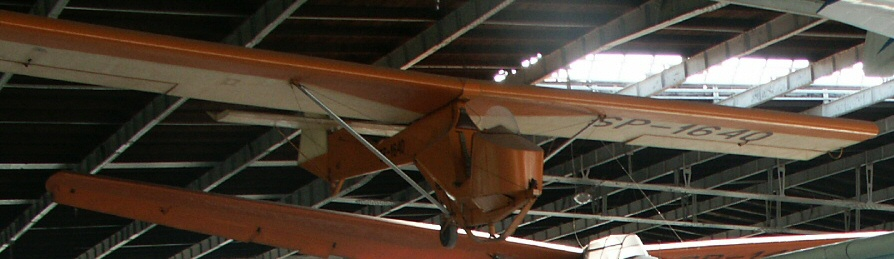
Czajka at the Polish Aviation Museum

== Specifications (SZD-18 Czajka with nacelle) ==
Data from SZD-18 Czajka

General characteristics

- Crew: 1
- Length: 6.3 m (20 ft 8 in)
- Wingspan: 10.8 m (35 ft 5 in)
- Height: 1.78 m (5 ft 10 in)
- Wing area: 15.7 m^{2} (169 sq ft)
- Aspect ratio: 7.4
- Airfoil: R-III
- Empty weight: 141 kg (311 lb)
- Gross weight: 226 kg (498 lb)

Performance

- Stall speed: 40 km/h (25 mph, 22 kn)
- Never exceed speed: 133 km/h (83 mph, 72 kn)
- g limits: +5
- Maximum glide ratio: 9.3 at 57 km/h (35 mph; 31 kn)
- Rate of sink: 1.13 m/s (222 ft/min) at 51 km/h (32 mph; 28 kn)
- Wing loading: 14.4 kg/m^{2} (2.9 lb/sq ft)

== See also ==
Aircraft of comparable role, configuration, and era

- SG-38 Zögling
