= Sroka =

Sroka or SROKA may refer to:

- Sroka (surname)
- Second Republic of Korea Army
- SZD-15 Sroka, a single-seat glider designed and built in Poland in 1956
