= SZD-13 Wampir =

Polish single-seat tail-less glider, not flown

General information
- Type: Glider aircraft
- National origin: Poland
- Manufacturer: SZD
- Designer: Irena Kaniewska
- Number built: 1

History
- First flight: not flown
- Developed from: SZD-6X Nietoperz

The SZD-13 Wampir (Szybowcowy Zakład Doświadczalny - Glider Experimental Works) was a single-seat tail-less glider designed and built in Poland from 1955.

== Development ==
The SZD-13 Wampir was a development of the SZD-6X Nietoperz, using a NACA laminar flow aerofoil. Main designer was Irena Kaniewska. Wind tunnel tests on the prototype were not encouraging, so it was not flown, in favor of the more advanced SZD-20 Wampir II.

== Specifications and predicted performance (SZD-13 Wampir) ==
Data from http://www.piotrp.de/SZYBOWCE/pszd13.htm

General characteristics

- Crew: 1
- Length: 3.64 m (11 ft 11 in)
- Wingspan: 15 m (49 ft 3 in)
- Wing area: 16 m^{2} (172 sq ft)
- Aspect ratio: 14.1
- Airfoil: NACA laminar flow

Performance

- Maximum speed: 210 km/h (130 mph, 113 kn)
- Stall speed: 57 km/h (35 mph, 31 kn)
- Maximum glide ratio: 29.4 at 75.5 km/h (46.9 mph/40.8 kts)
- Rate of sink: 0.64 m/s (126 ft/min) at 63.5 km/h (39.5 mph/34.3 kts)

== See also ==
Aircraft of comparable role, configuration, and era

- General Aircraft GAL.56
