= SZD-20X Wampir II =

Polish single-seat tail-less research glider, 1959

SZD 20x Wampir 2
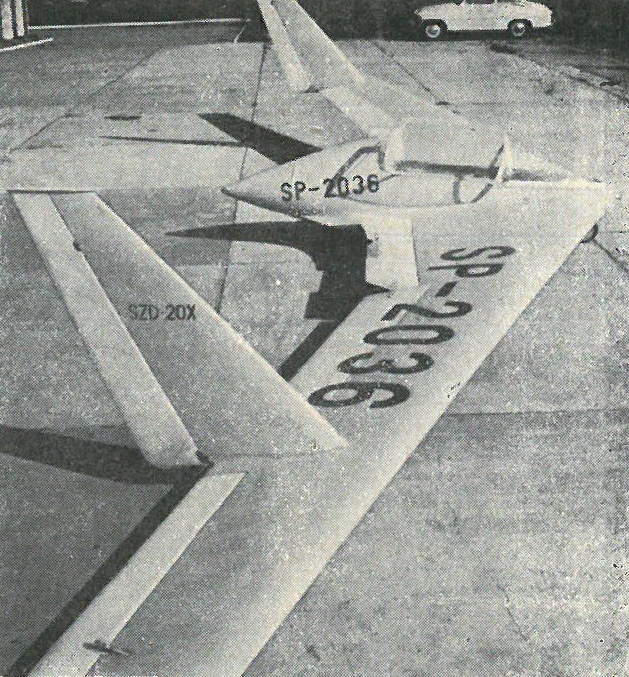

General information
- Type: Glider
- National origin: Poland
- Manufacturer: SZD
- Designer: Jan Dyrek
- Number built: 1

History
- First flight: 9 September 1959

The SZD-20x Wampir II (Szybowcowy Zakład Doświadczalny - Glider Experimental Works) was a single-seat tail-less research glider designed and built in Poland from 1959.

== Development ==
The SZD-20X Wampir II (vampire II) was designed to compare a flying wing designed to Standard class rules with a more conventional standard class glider. Main designer was Jan Dyrek. Based on experience with the earlier SZD-6X Nietoperz and SZD-13 Wampir tail-less gliders, the SZD-20X was an all wood flying wing, with the pilot sitting in a pod extending aft of the trailing edge on the centreline, and large swept fins & rudders at approx 2/3 span on each wing.

The SZD-20X was associated with the number 15, having a 15m span, aspect ratio of 15 and wing area of 15m², whether this was by design or accident is not known. Early flight trials commenced with hops towed behind a car to test control responses, followed by an aero-tow launch on 9 September 1959, piloted by Adam Zientek. Flight trials revealed a marked sensitivity to turbulence resulting in flutter, and during trials at stalling speed, the SZD-20X entered a spin, which the rudders were unable to recover the aircraft from, only when the pilot shifted his weight as far forward as he could, did the SZD-20X recover from the spin. Flying in the SZD-20X continued until 6 October 1959, when turbulence-induced flutter tore the aircraft apart, the pilot escaping with parachute.

== Specifications ==
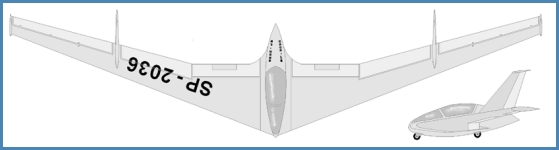
SZD-20X Wampir II

Data from The World's Sailplanes:Die Segelflugzeuge der Welt:Les Planeurs du Monde Volume II

General characteristics

- Crew: 1
- Length: 6.2 m (20 ft 4 in)
- Wingspan: 15 m (49 ft 3 in)
- Height: 1.7 m (5 ft 7 in)
- Wing area: 15 m^{2} (160 sq ft)
- Aspect ratio: 15
- Airfoil: NACA 23112
- Empty weight: 171 kg (377 lb) equipped
- Gross weight: 268 kg (591 lb)

Performance

- Stall speed: 50 km/h (31 mph, 27 kn)
- Never exceed speed: 200 km/h (120 mph, 110 kn)
- Aerotow speed: 120 km/h (75 mph; 65 kn)
- g limits: +4.5 -2 at 91 km/h (57 mph; 49 kn)
- Maximum glide ratio: 24.4 at 82 km/h (51 mph; 44 kn)
- Rate of sink: 0.84 m/s (165 ft/min) at 72 km/h (45 mph; 39 kn)
- Wing loading: 17.8 kg/m^{2} (3.6 lb/sq ft)

== See also ==
Aircraft of comparable role, configuration, and era

- Horten H.IV
- SZD-6X Nietoperz

Related lists

- List of gliders
