= SZD-40x Halny =

Polish two-seat glider, 1972

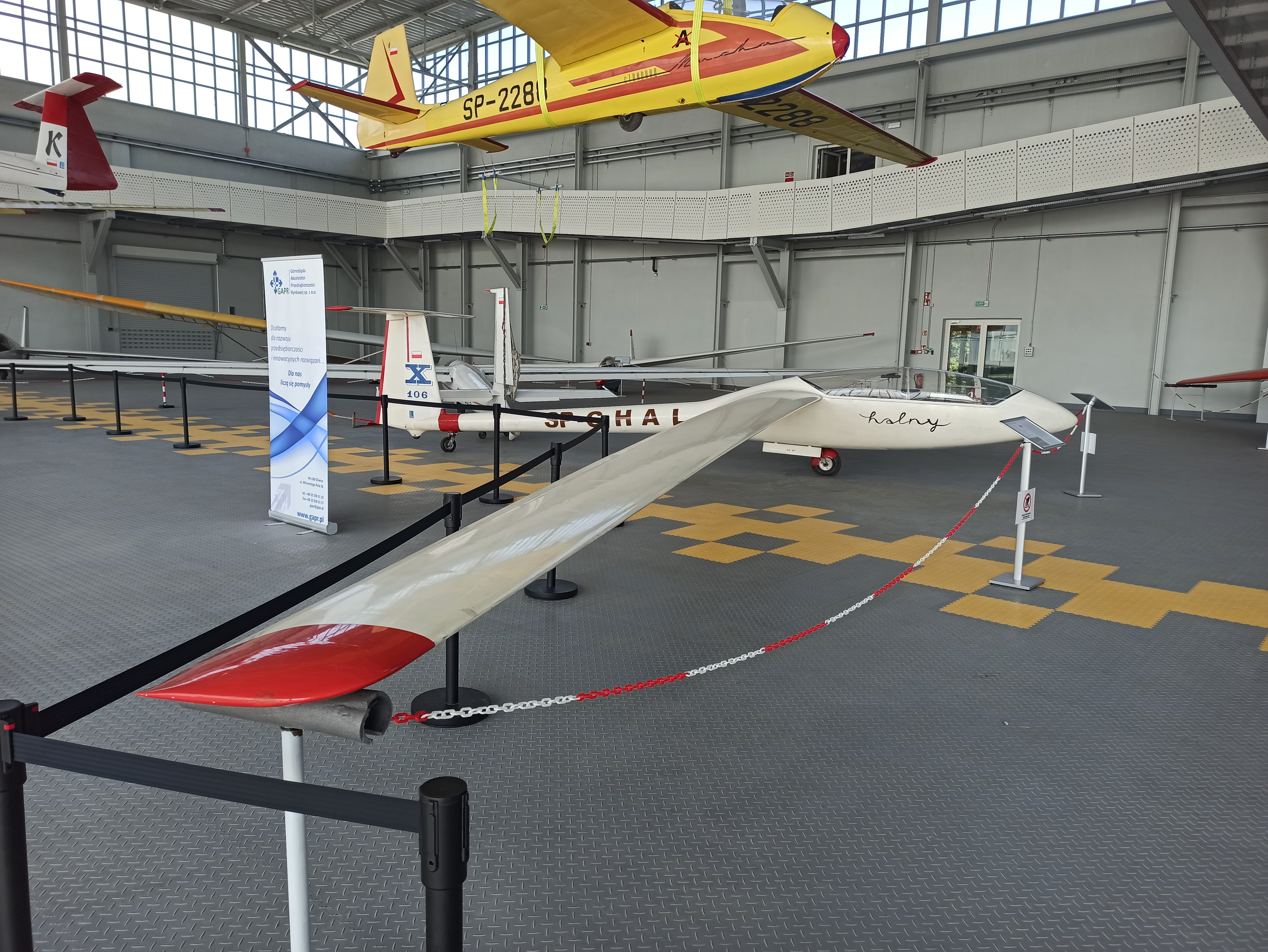

General information
- Type: Glider
- National origin: Poland
- Manufacturer: PZL Bielsko
- Designer: W. Okarmusa, M. Mikuszewskiego and J. Mandy
- Number built: 1

History
- First flight: 23 December 1972
- Developed from: SZD-31 Zefir 4 & SZD-38 Jantar 1

The SZD-40x Halny is an experimental two-seat glider designed and built in Poland in 1971.

== Development ==
Spurred on by the high performance two seaters emerging from the German Akafliegs, like the SB-10 Schirokko, SZD modified the SZD-37x Jantar fuselage to take two seats in tandem and fitted the wings developed from the Zefir 4 to make the SZD-40 Halny.

The SZD-40 Halny was intentioned to be a test platform for various new design concepts and to be produced in only one unit. It was certified as an experimental aircraft. It was expected that it will be used for record breaking attempts (of which many were ultimately successful) and piloted by most experienced pilots. In fact, the glider was not popular with most pilots due to very demanding handling properties.

Construction of the SZD-40 Halny uses mixed materials, with a fiberglass laminated forward fuselage, welded steel tube centre-section truss, rolled aluminum tube rear fuselage boom and fibreglass laminate tail section. The wings, extended to 20m span by adding extensions to the roots using a section substantially modified from the Zefir 4's original NACA 66 216 416, were constructed from plywood, pressure moulded in concrete moulds and covered with a layer of glass-fibre, to give a very smooth and accurate finish. Another meaningful modification from the original Zefir series wing was a change from Fowler (wing loading decreasing) flaps to camber increasing slotless flaps. This (flap) modification was a definite departure from previous (Zefir) attempts in variable wing geometry glider design. Notes by Eng. Jerzy Śmielkiewicz suggest that this was due to realisation that a laminar flow could not be sustained over the wing with (high speed retracted configuration) Fowler flap mechanism.

Unusually the Halny was built with only one set of instruments and controls in the rear cockpit, thus the front seat can only be used by passengers. Full span flaps and coupled ailerons are fitted to the trailing edges, with the flaps able to deflect upwards for high speed flight and the ailerons drooping in sympathy with downward flap deflection. All upper surfaces at the hinge points are formed by continuous flexible seals preventing leak- through causing drag and turbulence problems with the ailerons and flaps. The sole Halny, SP-2645 (c/n X-106), first flight in December 1972 flown by Zdzislaw Bylok, was used regularly into the 1990s before being retired to the Gliwice Gliding Club Museum

== Specifications (SZD-40x Halny) ==
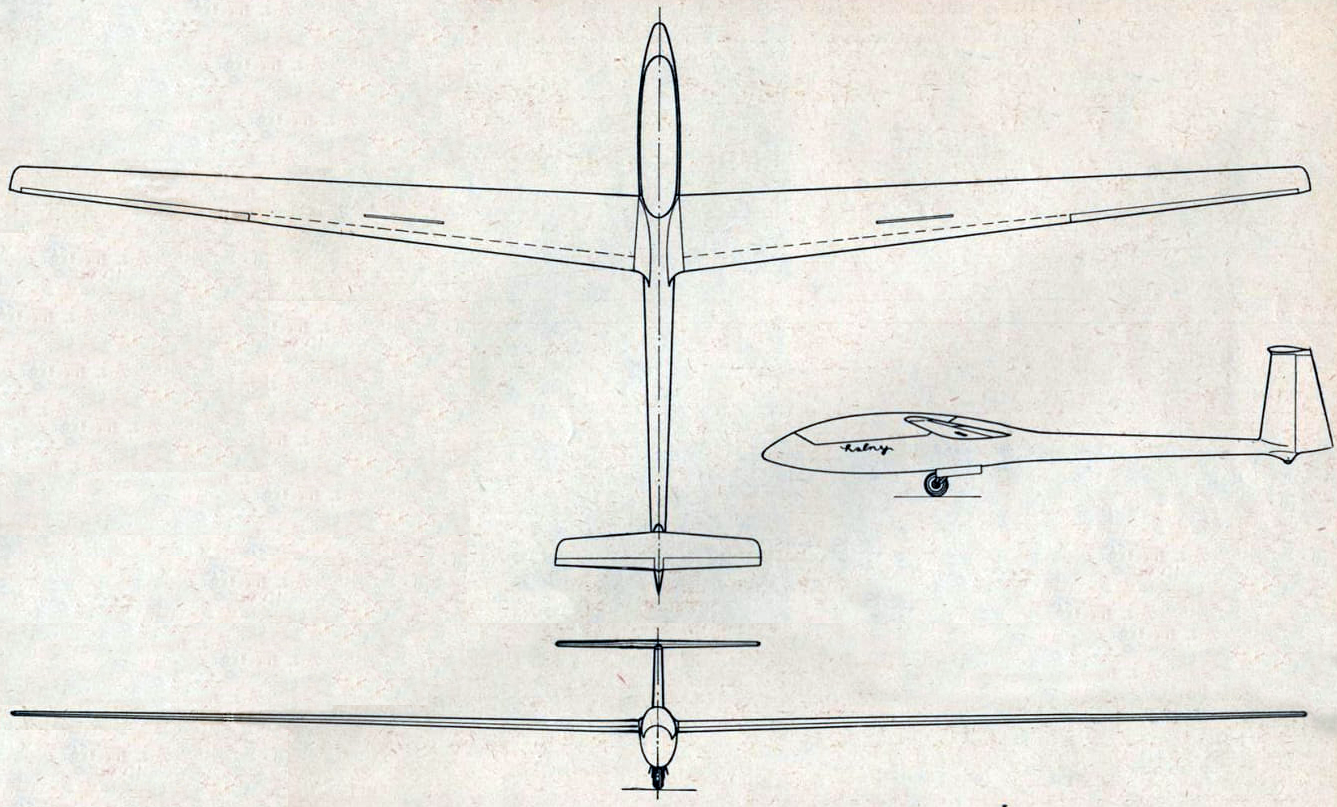
SZD-40x Halny

Data from

General characteristics

- Crew: 1
- Capacity: 1
- Length: 8.75 m (28 ft 8.5 in)
- Wingspan: 20 m (65 ft 7 in)
- Height: 1.74 m (5 ft 8 in)
- Wing area: 16.11 m^{2} (173.4 sq ft)
- Aspect ratio: 24.84 :1
- Airfoil: For all surfaces:-
  Wing - NN-11M
  Tailplane - NACA 64 1 012
  Fin - NACA 643 - 018 - NACA 652 - 015
- Empty weight: 410 kg (904 lb)
- Gross weight: 610 kg (1,345 lb)

Performance

- Maximum speed: 240 km/h (150 mph, 130 kn)
- Stall speed: 73 km/h (45 mph, 39 kn)
- g limits: +5 / -2.5
- Maximum glide ratio: 43 at 94 km/h (58 mph; 51 kn)
- Rate of sink: 0.59 m/s (116 ft/min) at 85 km/h (53 mph; 46 kn)

== See also ==
Aircraft of comparable role, configuration, and era

- Akaflieg Braunschweig SB-10 Schirokko
- Caproni Vizzola Calif
