= SZD-7 Osa =

Polish single-seat glider, 1950

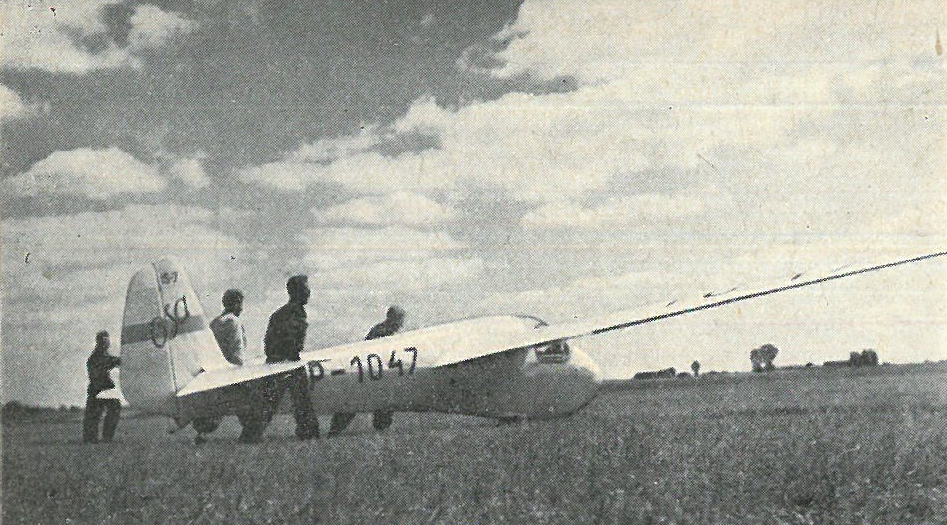

General information
- Type: Glider aircraft
- National origin: Poland
- Manufacturer: SZD
- Number built: 1

History
- First flight: 16 August 1950
- Developed from: IS-2 Mucha

The SZD-7 Osa was a single-seat developmental glider aircraft that was designed and built in Poland at Szybowcowy Zakład Doświadczalny (Glider Experimental Works) in Bielsko-Biała in 1950. Only one example was built.

== Development ==
The SZD-7 or IS-7 Osa (Wasp) was based on the IS-2 Mucha, with a laminar flow aerofoil section developed by Tadeusz Kostia. Little information on laminar flow aerofoils was available but Kostia was able to design the aerofoil for the SZD-7 Osa to achieve laminar flow to at least 18% chord. As well as the laminar flow wings, the Osa introduced the SZD plate-style airbrakes, which were installed aft of the mainspar. The first flight of the Osa took place at Bielsko airfield piloted by Adam Zientek on 16 August 1950. The prototype was registered as SP-1047.

== Specifications (SZD-7 Osa) ==
Data from http://www.piotrp.de/SZYBOWCE/pszd7.htm

General characteristics

- Crew: 1
- Length: 6.8 m (22 ft 4 in)
- Wingspan: 15 m (49 ft 3 in)
- Height: 1.6 m (5 ft 3 in)
- Wing area: 14.1 m^{2} (152 sq ft)
- Aspect ratio: 16
- Airfoil: Kosti laminar flow
- Empty weight: 237 kg (522 lb)
- Gross weight: 327 kg (721 lb)

Performance

- Maximum speed: 250 km/h (155 mph, 135 kn)
- Stall speed: 56 km/h (35 mph, 30 kn)
- g limits: +4.5 / -3
- Maximum glide ratio: 26.1 at 81 km/h (50 mph/44 kts)
- Rate of sink: 0.80 m/s (157 ft/min) at 73 km/h (45 mph/39 kts)

== See also ==
Aircraft of comparable role, configuration, and era

- IS-2 Mucha
