= SZD-28 =

Polish two-seat experimental glider, 1960

SZD-28 (Latające laboratorium)

General information
- Designer: Zbigniew Badura & Tadeusz Łabuć

History
- Developed from: SZD-9bis Bocian 1D

The SZD-28 (Latające laboratorium - Flying Laboratory) was a research glider designed in Poland from 1960.

== Development ==
The SZD-28 (Latające laboratorium - Flying Laboratory) was a twin hulled derivative of the SZD-9 Bocian 1D with two Bocian fuselages, outer wings from a Bocian and a new centre-section for testing aerofoils and other wing parts. The pilot occupied the front seat of the port fuselage with an optional observer in the starboard fuselage front seat. Equipment for test measurements was also to be carried in the rear cockpits of both hulls. Due to pressure of work at the department, work on the SZD-28 was discontinued, but the SZD-28 designation was reused as the SZD-28 Kondor, but little is known of this project.

== Specifications (SZD-28) ==
Data from http://www.piotrp.de/SZYBOWCE/pszd28.htm

General characteristics

- Crew: 1 or 2
- Length: 8.2 m (27 ft 0 in)
- Wingspan: 21.14 m (69 ft 5 in)
- Wing area: 25.1 m^{2} (270.2 sq ft)
- Aspect ratio: 17.8
- Airfoil: NACA43018 - NACA43012A

Performance

- Maximum speed: 200 km/h (124.3 mph, 108.0 kn)
- Stall speed: 59 km/h (36.7 mph, 31.9 kn)
- Rate of sink: 0.90 m/s (177 ft/min) at 68 km/h (42 mph; 37 kn)
