= Allstar SZD-54 Perkoz =

Polish two-seat glider

SZD-54 Perkoz
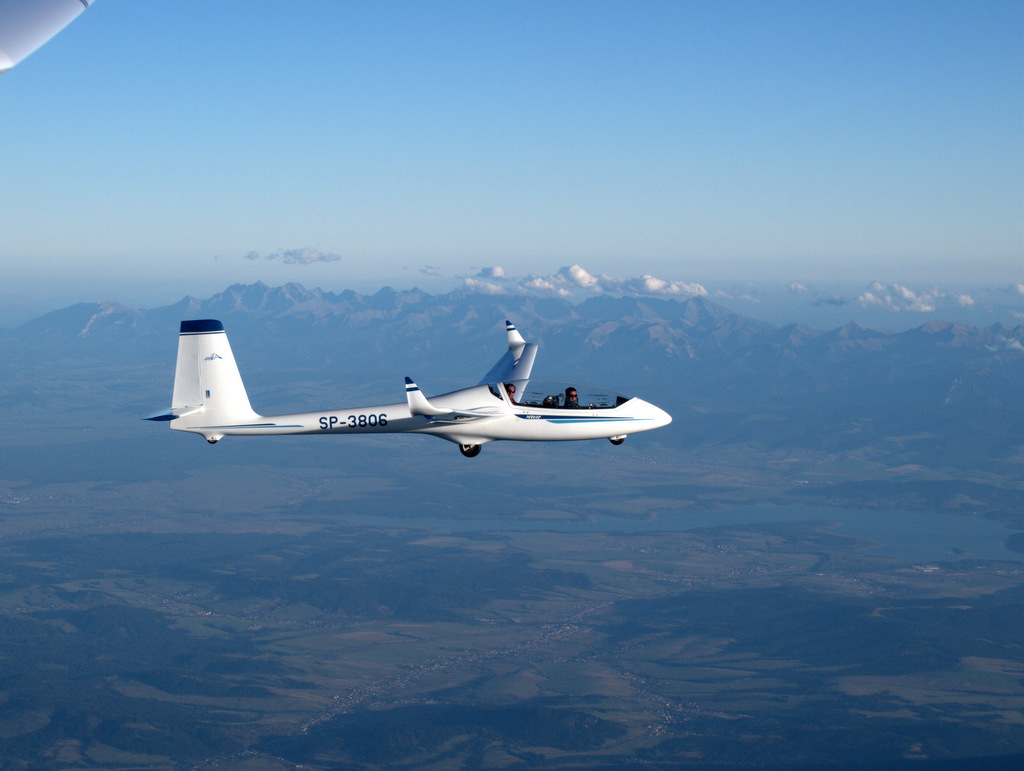
- SZD-54 Perkoz in front of the Tatra Mountains

General information
- Type: Glider
- National origin: Poland
- Manufacturer: Allstar PZL Glider
- Status: In production (2011)

History
- Manufactured: 2011-present
- First flight: 1991

The Allstar SZD-54 Perkoz (English: great crested grebe) is a two-seater, glider for training, aerobatics, cross country flight and cloud flying from the Polish manufacturer Allstar PZL Glider (formerly PZL Bielsko). The sailplane has exchangeable wing tips for either 17.5 or 20 metres (57.4 ft or 65.6 ft) and is manufactured primarily from glass fibre reinforced plastic (GFRP). Without wing extension, it is certified for unlimited aerobatic manoeuvres. For glider training, the short wingspan (17.5 metres) is supplemented with winglets. As a cross-country glider with a 20 metres wing and winglets, the Perkoz has a glider index of 102. The SZD-54-2 Perkoz is the successor of the widely used SZD-50-3 Puchacz trainer, which is part of the SZD family of aircraft.

== Design ==
The SZD-54 was designed in 1991 by Adam Meus as a universal sailplane for flight training and aerobatics, and is certified to European Aviation Safety Agency (EASA) CS22 standards. It is designed as a replacement for the SZD-50-3 Puchacz, a two-seater training glider from 1979, which Adam Meus also led the design.

The sailplane can be purchased with 3 wing configurations: 17.5-metres wingspan with simple wing tips for aerobatics, 17.5-metre wingspan with attached winglets for training flights, and 20-metres wingspan with attached wing tips and winglets for cross-country flights. Despite its fixed landing gear, the SZD-54-2 has a best glide ratio of 42:1 with the 20 metres span wing and offering a glide ratio of 38:1 with the 17.5 metres.

The SZD-54-2 (17.5-metre) is engineered for aerobatics and aerobatic instruction with high load factor of +7 g and -5 g that can be exploited up to Vne (never-exceed speed) of 269 km/h, meeting the unlimited acrobatic category. This includes manoeuvres with reversed airflow, as well as snap (flick) rolls that exceed the classic figures. The aircraft is made predominantly from glass fibre reinforced plastic (GFRP), selected components such as the rudder and replaceable wing tips are reinforced with carbon fibre. The fuselage is a shell construction with welded tubular steel frames to support the wings and landing gear.

It features a cantilever mid-wingwith the laminar airfoil NN-8 and has a trapezoidal plan form. The laminar airfoil was developed for the SZD-41 / SZD-48 Jantar Standard by the team led by Professor Jerzy Ostrowski at the Aerodynamics Department of the Warsaw University of Technology. The ailerons with 20% of chord depth are generously dimensioned for aerobatics. The wing has Schempp-Hirth-type air brakes. All controls are automatically connected upon assembly.

As the sailplane is designed for aerobatics, it features a conventional tailplane for enhanced strength. The horizontal stabilizer is located far back and is attached to the top of the fuselage. The rudder has a characteristically large rudder horn to reduce control forces in aerobatics.

The Perkoz is equipped with a fixed monowheel gear, a main wheel with spring suspension, a hydraulic disc brake, as well a small nosewheel and a tail caster. The seats in the cockpit are arranged in tandem, one behind the other. The one-piece cockpit canopy with sliding windows opens sideways to the right. It is equipped with a "Röger hook" for emergency jettison. The SZD-54-2 has two instrument panels and two cushioned seat shells with neck support. The pilot can adjust their seating position at the front using the rudder pedals and at the rear using the ground-adjustable seat. Trim weights are located in the front cockpit to compensate for light student pilots (min. 55 kg). The cockpit has been certified as a safety cockpit according to the 2016 CS-22 standard.

The maximum wing loading of the aerobatic version is 36.1 kg/m2, of the 20-metre version is 35.5 kg/m2.The SZD-54 has a design airframe life of 15,000 flight hours, but is approved for 3,000 hours and comes from the factory with a two-year warranty.

== Development ==
The first flight of the SZD-54 Perkoz prototype (registration number SP-P519) took place on 8 May 1991 in Jelenia Góra with pilot Jerzy Śmielkiewicz. Economic shifts in Eastern European nations in the early 1990s slowed down further development.

On 14 May 1999, the second Perkoz prototype flew in Jelenia Góra with test pilot Jack Marszalek. Some modifications were made to the first prototype: for example in order to improve the flight characteristics in aerobatics, the incidence angle of the wing was reduced to + 1°.

In 2002, Allstar PZL Glider took over the rights of this aircraft type from the insolvent state-owned company PDPSz PZL Bielsko. Allstar PZL Glider has made significant improvements to the two-seater glider. Firstly, the wing was extended with an extension and winglet. The new wingspan of 20 metres increases the glide ratio to 42. Secondly, the wingspan of 17.5 metre was equipped with winglets. Dr. Krzysztof Kubrynski of the Warsaw University of Technology developed both winglets. Furthermore, automatic elevator connections, a gas spring assisted canopy opening, a hydraulic disc brake on the main wheel and a "Röger hook" on the canopy were established.

The test flight of the new SZD-54-2 Perkoz (SP-8013) was conducted on 2 April 2007 with pilot Mariusz Stajewski for the EASA certification. The EASA increased the safety requirements for new glider cockpits in the CS-22 construction rules during the certification process. The new requirements were adopted, the cockpit was revised, and the aircraft received its final EASA certification in 2013.

== Flight characteristics ==
The design of the Perkoz as a training and aerobatic two-seater sailplane makes it a very manoeuvrable aircraft with a high roll rate, even with a 20-metre wingspan. For spin training during basic and advanced flight instruction, the aircraft does not have any temporary modifications, such as e.g. adding extra weights to the tail unit. The stall is clearly indicated by decreasing control pressure and buffeting. The spin is deliberately initiated, and its recovery is precise and without delay.

The SZD-54-2 has well-balanced controls and moderate control forces. In a thermal, the glider circles and centres steadily. The sailplane accelerates quickly with the NN-8 airfoil and achieves a glide ratio of 42 in the 20-metre version. At speeds exceeding 140 km/h, it presents disadvantages in comparison to designs that have been solely optimised for cross-country flight performance.

The take-off distance in aerotow is short because the Perkoz has large wing surfaces and good climb rates for a training two-seater. When landing, the large effective Schempp-Hirth-type air brakes are activated, or it is possible to slip. Landing is on the main wheel. The landing flare is relatively short. In aerobatics tail slide, quarter rolls down and up, snap (flick) as well as negative manoeuvers can be trained.

== Operational history ==
By November 2012 two examples had been registered in the United States with the Federal Aviation Administration.

In December 2017, the Colombian Air Force had received two SZD-54-2 gliders for training purposes.

== Specifications (SZD-54-2, 20 m configuration / utility category) ==
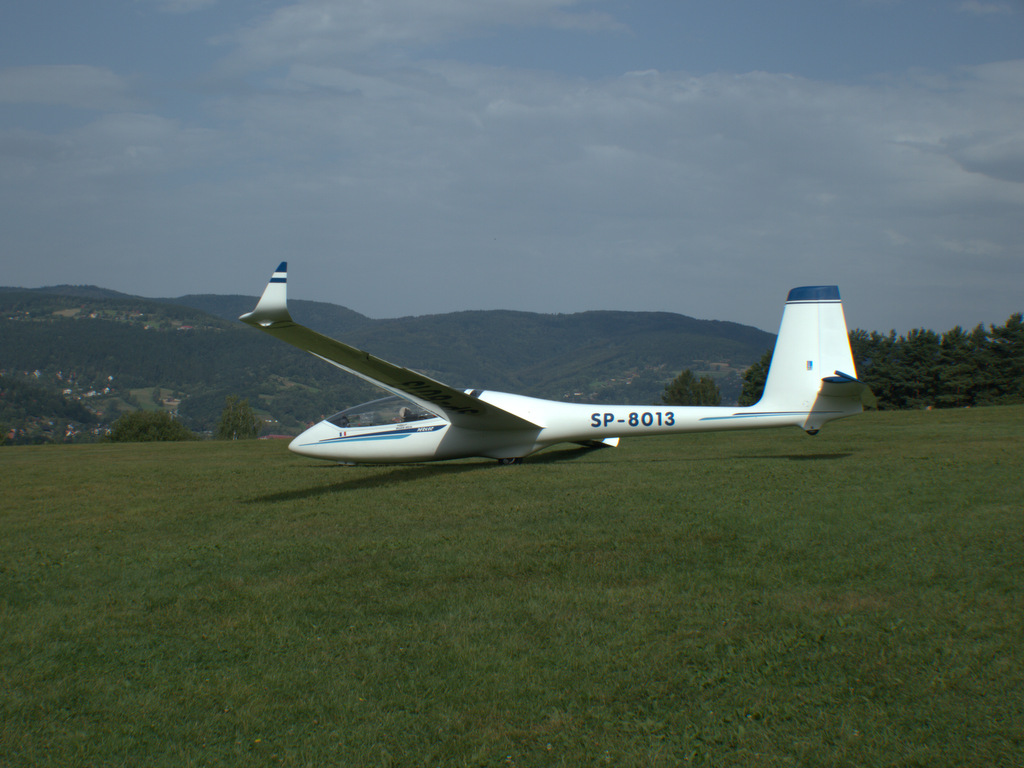
SZD-54 Perkoz

Data from Bayerl and Allstar PZL Glider

General characteristics

- Crew: two
- Length: 8.44 m (27 ft 8 in)
- Wingspan: 20 m (65 ft 7 in)
- Height: 2.05 m (6 ft 9 in)
- Wing area: 17.30 m^{2} (186.2 sq ft)
- Aspect ratio: 23.13
- Airfoil: NN-8
- Empty weight: 380 kg (838 lb)
- Max takeoff weight: 615 kg (1,356 lb)

Performance

- Cruise speed: 166 km/h (103 mph, 90 kn)
- Stall speed: 67 km/h (42 mph, 36 kn)
- Never exceed speed: 244 km/h (152 mph, 132 kn)
- g limits: +5.3/-2.65
- Maximum glide ratio: 42:1 at 102 km/h (63 mph)
- Rate of sink: 0.68 m/s (134 ft/min) at 88 km/h (55 mph)
- Wing loading: 35.5 kg/m^{2} (7.3 lb/sq ft)

== Specifications (SZD-54-2, 17.5 m configuration / aerobatic category) ==
Data from Bayerl and Allstar

General characteristics

- Crew: two
- Length: 8.44 m (27 ft 8 in)
- Wingspan: 17.5 m (57 ft 5 in)
- Height: 2.05 m (6 ft 9 in)
- Wing area: 16.36 m^{2} (176.1 sq ft)
- Aspect ratio: 18.70
- Airfoil: N-8
- Empty weight: 375 kg (827 lb)
- Max takeoff weight: 590 kg (1,301 lb)

Performance

- Cruise speed: 194 km/h (121 mph, 105 kn)
- Stall speed: 69 km/h (43 mph, 37 kn)
- Never exceed speed: 269 km/h (167 mph, 145 kn)
- g limits: +7/-5
- Maximum glide ratio: 38:1 at 110 km/h (68 mph)
- Rate of sink: 0.80 m/s (157 ft/min) at 90 km/h (56 mph)
- Wing loading: 36.1 kg/m^{2} (7.4 lb/sq ft)

== See also ==
Related lists

- List of gliders
