= SZD-36 Cobra 15 =

Polish single-seat glider, 1979

SZD-36 Cobra
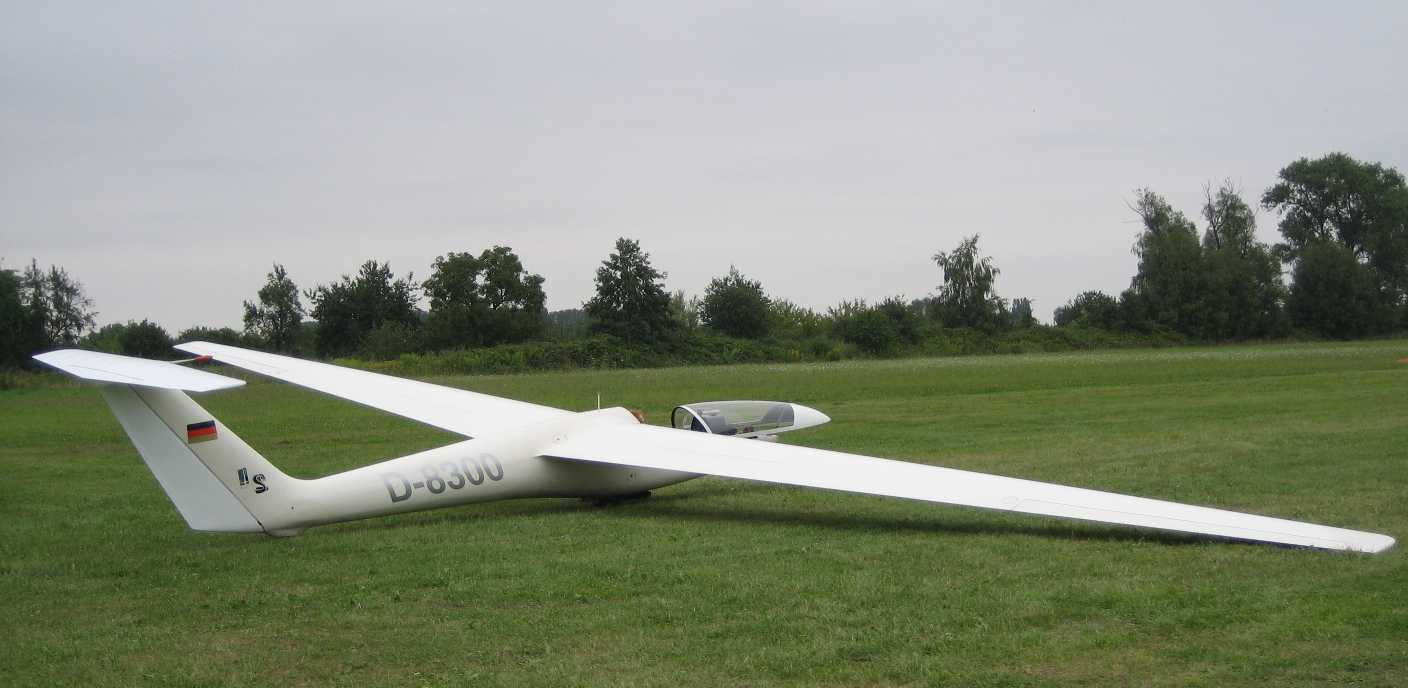
- SZD-36 Cobra

General information
- Type: Glider aircraft
- National origin: Poland
- Designer: W. Okarmus, A. Meus und M. Mikuszewski.
- Number built: 290 x SZD-36 Cobra + 2 x SZD-39 Cobra 17

History
- First flight: 31 December 1969
- Developed from: SZD-32A Foka 5

The SZD-36 Cobra was a glider designed and produced in Poland from 1968.

== Development ==
The SZD-36 was the penultimate iteration of the SZD-24 Foka, with improved construction techniques and materials and many detail changes over the Foka 5. The aircraft was designed especially for the 1970 World Gliding Championships at Marfa, Texas, where J. Wroblewski took 2nd and F. Kępka took 3rd places in the Standard Class behind a Rolladen-Schneider LS1. The Cobra also proved popular with ordinary pilots resulting in a long production run of 290, of which 215 were exported.

To compete in the Open class at Marfa in 1970, W. Okramus and M. Mikuszewski developed a 17m span version as the SZD-39 Cobra 17, which took 5th place flown by Edward Makula.

Construction was predominantly of wood with plywood skinned semi-monocoque fuselage, thick skinned built up wings, and fibreglass cockpit shell. With high g limits, high V_{ne} and effective speed limiting air-brakes on the upper surface of the wings, the SZD-36 Cobra is popular as an aerobatic machine. There have been cases of catastrophic structural failure due to incorrect wing attachment, caused ultimately by worn parts in the attachment assemblies.

== Safety Concern ==
Following a fatal accident due to failure of the wing attachment mechanism in 2007 and another fatality with a glider with similar assembly mechanism, the British Gliding Association has issued a Safety Alert for owners of Cobra gliders.

== Variants ==
SZD-36 Cobra
Developed from the SZD-32A Foka 5, a 15m Standard Class sailplane developed for the 1970 World championships. 290 built
SZD-39 Cobra 17
A 17m span version of the Cobra developed for the 1970 World Gliding Championships in the Open Class, first flown on 17 March 1970. Two were built.

== Specifications (SZD-36 Cobra) ==
Data from http://www.piotrp.de/SZYBOWCE/dszd36.htm

General characteristics

- Crew: 1
- Length: 6.98 m (22 ft 11 in)
- Wingspan: 15 m (49 ft 2.5 in)
- Height: 1.59 m (5 ft 2.5 in)
- Wing area: 11.6 m^{2} (124.9 sq ft)
- Aspect ratio: 19.4
- Airfoil: FX 61-168 - FX 60-1261
- Empty weight: 275 kg (606 lb)
- Gross weight: 405 kg (893 lb)

Performance

- Maximum speed: 250 km/h (160 mph, 130 kn)
- Stall speed: 67 km/h (42 mph, 36 kn)
- g limits: +6 / -3
- Maximum glide ratio: 38 at 97 km/h (60 mph; 52 kn)
- Rate of sink: 0.72 m/s (142 ft/min) at 73 km/h (45 mph; 39 kn)
