= PZL Bielsko SZD-50 Puchacz =

Polish two-place training and aerobatic sailplane

SZD-50 Puchacz
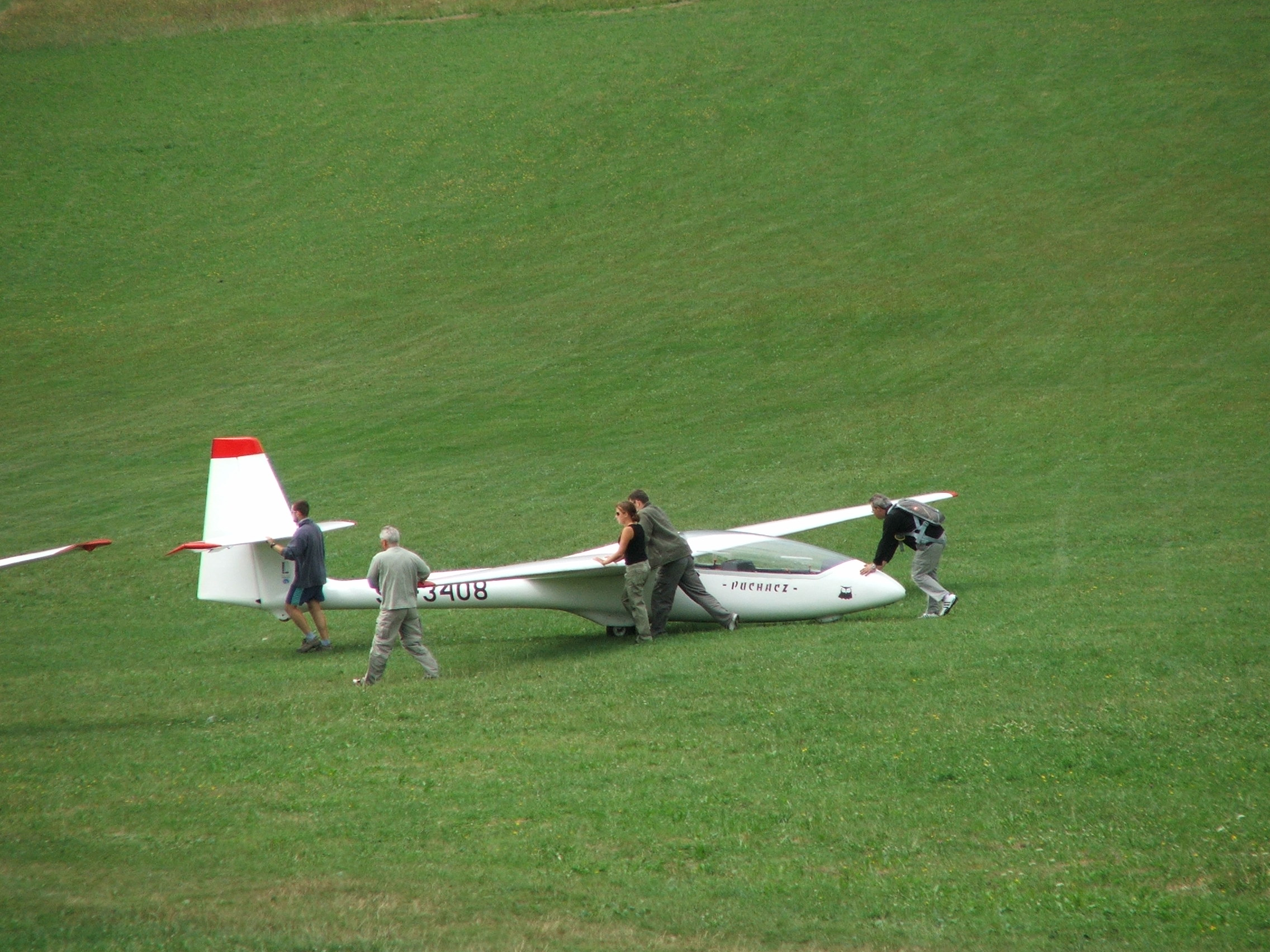

General information
- Type: Sailplane
- National origin: Poland
- Manufacturer: PZL Bielsko
- Designer: Adam Meus

History
- First flight: 13 April 1979

The PZL Bielsko SZD-50 Puchacz (Polish: "eagle owl") is a Polish two-place training and aerobatic sailplane.

== Development ==
The Puchacz was designed by Dipl-Ing Adam Meus based on the prototype SZD-50-1 Dromader. It was intended to serve as the successor to the popular Bocian for training. Its first flight was April 13, 1979.

The Puchacz is an affordable and adaptable modern two-seater sailplane. Due to its good handling in the air and on the ground, it is used in numerous countries for teaching beginner pilots and for aerobatic training.

A large number of fatal accidents involving spins have occurred with the Puchacz. Investigations have failed to uncover a common design flaw, but the type's reputation has nevertheless been tainted. Its supporters point out that it was designed to obey faithfully all control inputs - including foolish ones. Partial failures at the rudder bar and control sticks have been known to occur, but Airworthiness Directives have been issued for modifications.

== Description ==
The Puchacz is a construction protected by polyurethane paint rather than the more usual gelcoat finish. Although it is mainly glassfibre, the fuselage has two wooden frames as the connection point for the wings and undercarriage. Assembly entails inserting a single main pin to secure the wings in place and a spring-loaded locking pin for the tailplane. The air brakes open above and below the wings and are extremely efficient in comparison with other gliders, allowing very steep flight.

It has a tandem seating arrangement for the two occupants with the front seat used for solo flights. The front rudder pedals and the rear seat shell are adjustable. The front instruments are arranged so that they can be easily viewed from the rear seat; a rear instruments panel is also available as an option.

The Puchacz meets both OSTIV and JAR-22 Utility Category certification requirements and is approved for extended aerobatics including inverted flight and rolling manoeuvres.

== Variants ==
SZD-50-1 Dromader
The initial design and prototype of the Puchacz series, first flown on 21 December 1976; two built.
SZD-50-2 Puchacz
Initial production variant first flown on 13 April 1979.
SZD-50-3 Puchacz
Later production standard with fin mounted 300 mm (12 in) higher, enlarged rudder and main-wheel fairing.

== Specifications (SZD-50-3) ==
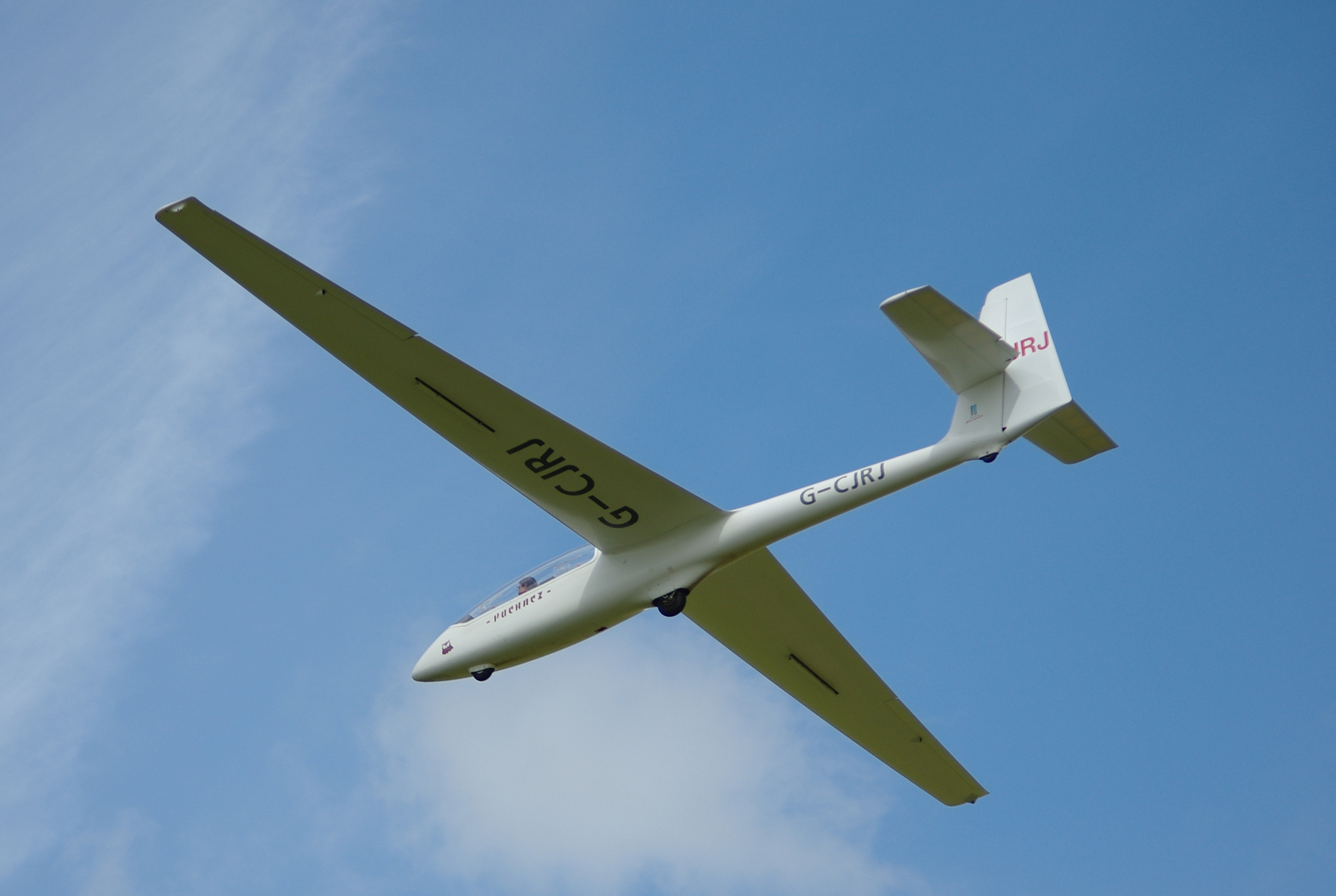
SZD-50-3 G-CJRJ at the Vintage Glider Rally, Camphill in June 2011

Data from Jane's All the World's Aircraft 1988-89

General characteristics

- Crew: 2
- Length: 8.38 m (27 ft 6 in)
- Wingspan: 16.67 m (54 ft 8 in)
- Height: 2.04 m (6 ft 8 in)
- Wing area: 18.16 m^{2} (195.5 sq ft)
- Aspect ratio: 15.3
- Airfoil: NN-8
- Empty weight: 370 kg (816 lb)
- Max takeoff weight: 570 kg (1,257 lb)

Performance

- Stall speed: 60 km/h (37 mph, 32 kn)
- Never exceed speed: 215 km/h (134 mph, 116 kn) in smooth air

160 km/h (86 kn) in rough air
150 km/h (81 kn) on aero-tow
110 km/h (59 kn) on winch launch

- g limits: +5.3 -2.65
- Maximum glide ratio: 32
- Best glide speed: 85 km/h (46 kn; 53 mph)
- Rate of sink: 0.7 m/s (140 ft/min) *Minimum sink speed: 75 km/h (40 kn; 47 mph)
- Wing loading: 31.4 kg/m^{2} (6.4 lb/sq ft)

== See also ==
Aircraft of comparable role, configuration, and era

- Schleicher ASK 21

Related lists

- List of gliders
