= SZD-25A Lis =

Polish single-seat glider, 1958

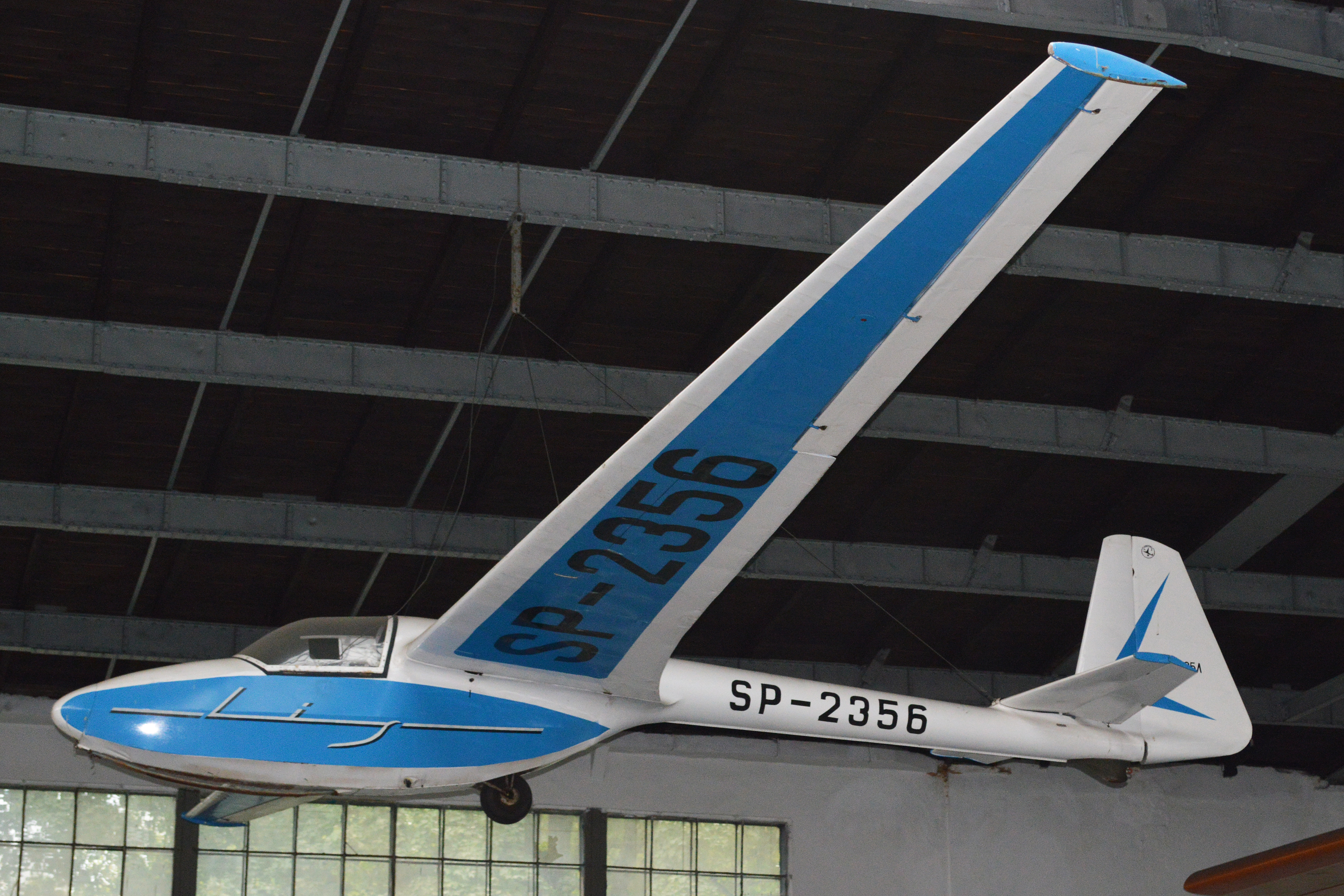
- SZD-25A Lis at the Polish Aviation Museum

General information
- Type: Glider
- National origin: Poland
- Manufacturer: PZL Bielsko
- Designer: Zbigniew Badura
- Number built: 1 x SZD-16 Gil, 1 x SZD-25 Nov, 30 x SZD-25A Lis

History
- First flight: 20 October 1958

The SZD-25A Lis (Szybowcowy Zakład Doświadczalny - Glider Experimental Works) was a single-seat glider aircraft that was designed and built in Poland from 1955, derived from the SZD-16 Gil and SZD-25 Nov.

== Development ==
Although design of the SZD-16 Gil was started in 1955, the prototype was not completed until 1958, when interest in gliders with metal structures increased. The SZD-16 was a simple single-seat training glider originally intended to form part of the LPŻ (Soldier's Friends League) aero clubs training regime. The main designer was Zbigniew Badura. The fuselage was of metal and the wings were of wood.

The single-seat training methods were abandoned at around the time of the SZD-16's first flight, but the prototype was used for research into metal structures in gliders as well as new forms of air brakes. The SZD-16 was a cantilever shoulder-winged aircraft with the tail supported on a narrow tubular aluminium alloy boom extending from aft of the wooden wings, which attached to the pod-like welded steel tube fuselage housing the cockpit. Flight trials commenced with Adam Zientek piloting SP-1880 on the first flight on 20 October 1958. After the initial flight trials the fuselage was modified to accept wings from an SZD-22 Mucha Standard, to produce the SZD-16 Gil Z, which was used to test a new form of air brake.

Further testing and the need for single seater aircraft with reasonable performance for club flying, prompted development of the SZD-16Z Gil Z fitted with a wing derived from that of the SZD-22 Mucha Standard. Improved structure, new wing and other improvements resulted in the SZD-25A Lis production aircraft, of which 30 were built.

== Variants ==
- SZD-16 Gil - prototype of the Gil with tubular rear fuselage and low-performance wing.
- SZD-16Z Gil Z - prototype SZD-16 fitted with wings adapted from the SZD-22 Mucha Standard.
- SZD-25 Nov - production prototype version of the SZD-16Z Gil Z for use as club single-seat aircraft with improved performance over the SZD-16 trainer, 1 built.
- SZD-25A Lis - production aircraft, 30 built, of which 13 were exported.

== Specifications (SZD-25A Lis) ==
Data from The World's Sailplanes:Die Segelflugzeuge der Welt:Les Planeurs du Monde Volume II

General characteristics

- Crew: 1
- Length: 7 m (23 ft 0 in) (SZD-25A Lis)

6.85 m (22 ft 6 in) (SZD-16 Gil)

- Wingspan: 14.98 m (49 ft 2 in) (SZD-25A Lis)

13.5 m (44 ft 3 in) (SZD-16 Gil)

- Wing area: 12.75 m^{2} (137.2 sq ft) (SZD-25A Lis)

14 m^{2} (151 sq ft) (SZD-16 Gil)

- Aspect ratio: 17.65(SZD-25A Lis)

13 (SZD-16 Gil)

- Airfoil: Root:Göttingen 549, Tip: M12 (aerofoil) (SZD-25A Lis)

Root:NACA 43018 mod., Mid: NACA 43012A, Tip: NACA 43012A(SZD-16 Gil)

- Empty weight: 208 kg (459 lb) (SZD-25A Lis)

177 kg (390 lb) (SZD-16 Gil)

- Gross weight: 315 kg (694 lb) (SZD-25A Lis)

298 kg (657 lb) (SZD-16 Gil)

Performance

- Stall speed: 57.6 km/h (35.8 mph, 31.1 kn) (SZD-25A Lis)

52 km/h (32.3 mph; 28.1 kn) (SZD-16 Gil)

- Never exceed speed: 230 km/h (140 mph, 120 kn) (SZD-25A Lis)

200 km/h (124.3 mph; 108.0 kn) (SZD-16 Gil)

- Rough air speed max: 130 km/h (80.8 mph; 70.2 kn) (SZD-25A Lis)

140 km/h (87.0 mph; 75.6 kn) (SZD-16 Gil)

- Aerotow speed: 130 km/h (80.8 mph; 70.2 kn)
- g limits: +6 -3 (SZD-25A Lis)

+5 -2.5 (SZD-16 Gil)

- Maximum glide ratio: 27 at 75.2 km/h (46.7 mph; 40.6 kn) (SZD-25A Lis)

19.8 at 70 km/h (43.5 mph; 37.8 kn) (SZD-16 Gil)

- Rate of sink: 0.76 m/s (150 ft/min) at 69.1 km/h (42.9 mph; 37.3 kn) (SZD-25A Lis)

0.9 m/s (177.2 ft/min) at 60 km/h (37.3 mph; 32.4 kn) (SZD-16 Gil)

- Wing loading: 24.7 kg/m^{2} (5.1 lb/sq ft) (SZD-25A Lis)

21.3 kg/m^{2} (4.36 lb/sq ft) (SZD-16 Gil)

== See also ==
Aircraft of comparable role, configuration, and era

- Bowlus BA-100 Baby Albatross
