= SZD-9 Bocian =

Polish two-seat glider, 1953

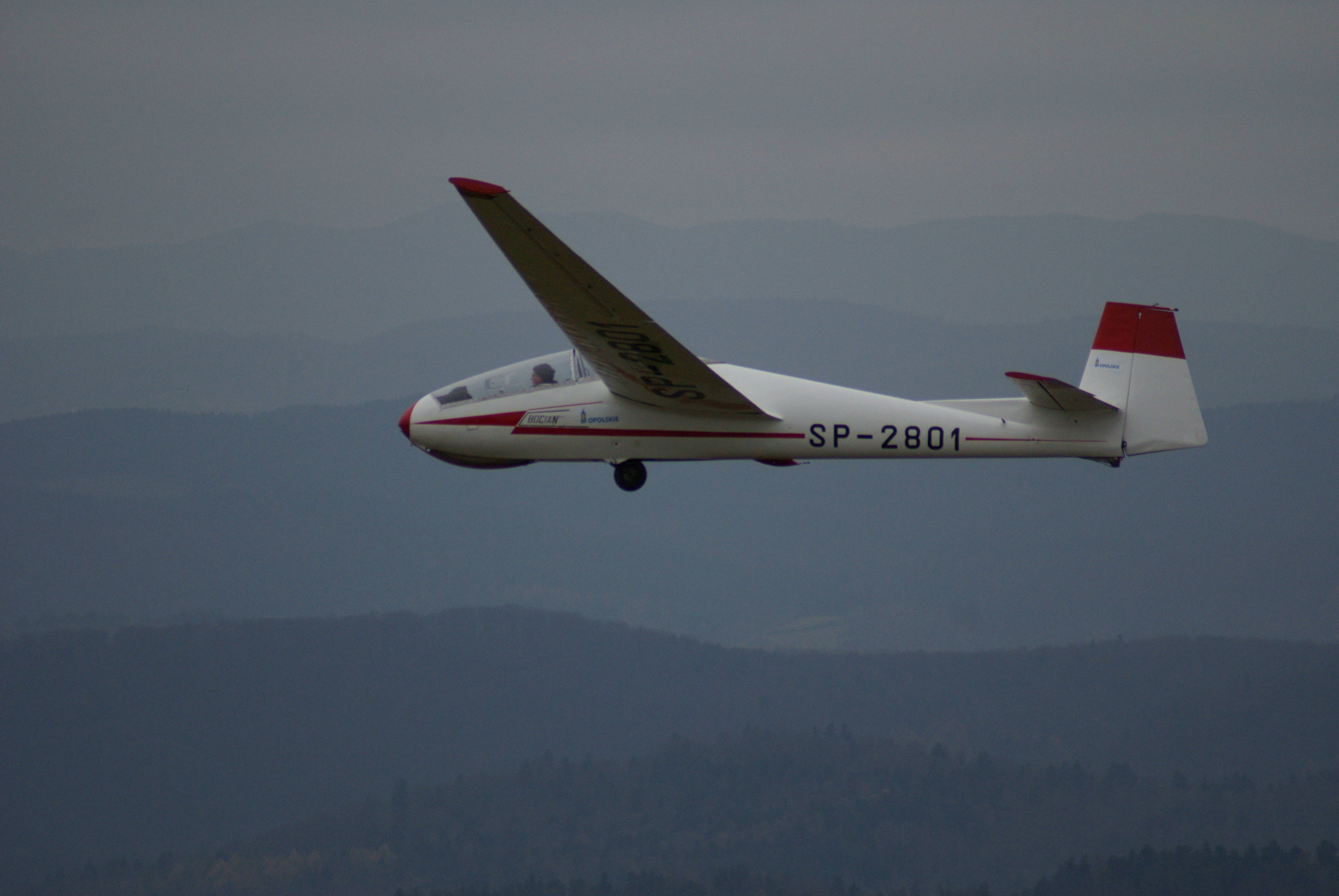
- SZD-9 Bocian

General information
- Type: Two Seater Class sailplane
- National origin: Poland
- Manufacturer: SZD
- Designer: Marian Wasilewski; Roman Zatwarnicki; Justyn Sandauer
- Status: in service
- Primary user: Polish Aero Club
- Number built: 616

History
- Introduction date: 1953
- First flight: 10 March 1952

The SZD-9 Bocian (Polish: "Stork") is a multi-purpose two-seat sailplane that was designed and built in Poland at Szybowcowy Zakład Doświadczalny (Glider Experimental Works) in Bielsko-Biała, beginning in 1952. It was designed to be capable of fulfilling the needs of every area from training to competition flying.

== History ==
Main designer was Marian Wasilewski, with Roman Zatwarnicki and Justyn Sandauer. The prototype SZD-9 flew for the first time on 10 March 1952, piloted by Adam Zientek. After flight testing was completed, suggested changes were incorporated into the design and production began, as SZD-9bis Bocian-1A (or simply "Bocian A"). The first production unit flew for the first time on 13 March 1953, and 11 units were built.

Apart from use in Poland, the type was exported to 27 countries, including Austria, Australia, Belgium, China, France, Greece, India, Norway, former East Germany and West Germany, Switzerland, Tunisia, Turkey, Venezuela, United Kingdom, and the Soviet Union. Polish pilots set many international records flying SZD-9s.

== Variants ==
- SZD-9 Bocian – two prototypes
- SZD-9bis Bocian-1A – the first variant, 11 built
- SZD-9bis Bocian-1B – improved variant (e.g. bigger tailfin), 11 built
- SZD-9bis Bocian-1C – improved variant of 1954 (wings swept at lesser angle, modified control surfaces and rear skid), 40 built
- SZD-9bis Bocian-Z – modified competition variant for 1956 World Gliding Competition, 3 built (2 rebuilt of Bocian C)
- SZD-9bis Bocian-1D – improved variant of 1958 (bigger wheel and minor modifications), 186 built
- SZD-9bis Bocian-1E – modified trainer variant of 1967 (straight wing tips, two-part canopy instead of three-part, landing gear with shock absorbers), 366 built
- SZD-33 Bocian 3 – intended to replace SZD-9's and SZD-10's but discontinued in favour of the SZD-9bis Bocian-1E.

== Specifications (SZD-9bis) ==
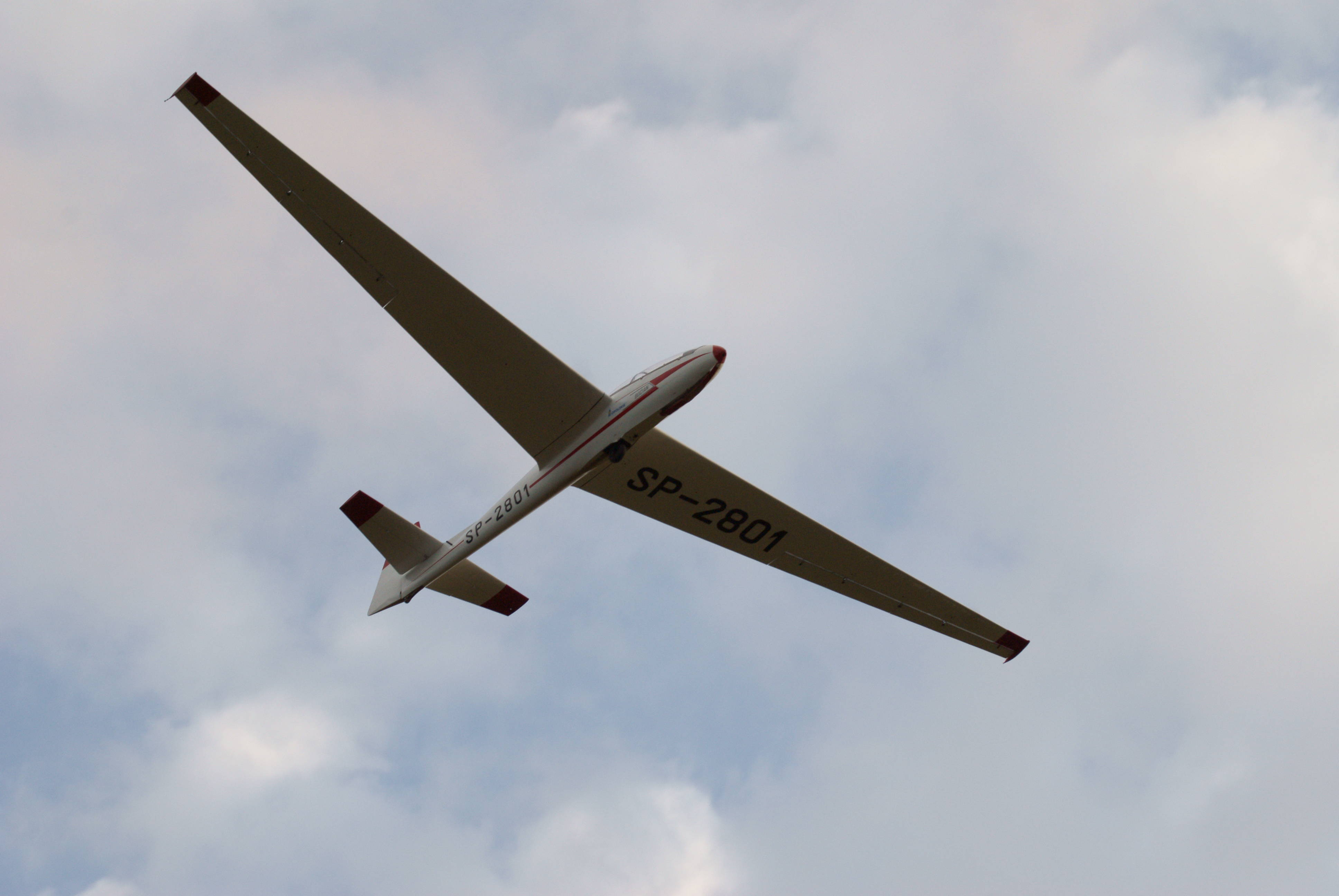
An SZD-9 Bocian of Aeroklub Opolski

Data from The World's Sailplanes:Die Segelflugzeuge der Welt:Les Planeurs du Monde

General characteristics

- Crew: 2
- Length: 8.2 m (26 ft 11 in)
- Wingspan: 18.1 m (59 ft 5 in)
- Height: 1.8 m (5 ft 11 in)
- Wing area: 20 m^{2} (220 sq ft)
- Aspect ratio: 16.2
- Airfoil: root: NACA 43018A; tip: NACA 43012A
- Empty weight: 330 kg (728 lb)
- Max takeoff weight: 525 kg (1,157 lb)

Performance

- Stall speed: 52 km/h (32 mph, 28 kn)
- Never exceed speed: 200 km/h (120 mph, 110 kn)
- Max aerotow speed: 140 km/h (87 mph; 76 kn)
- Max winch launch speed: 115 km/h (71 mph; 62 kn)
- g limits: (ultimate)

+10.5 at 138 km/h (86 mph; 75 kn)
+5.25 at 250 km/h (160 mph; 130 kn)
0 at 250 km/h (160 mph; 130 kn)
-2.62 at 250 km/h (160 mph; 130 kn)

- Maximum glide ratio: 26 at 84 km/h (52 mph; 45 kn)
- Rate of sink: 0.8 m/s (160 ft/min) at 71 km/h (44 mph; 38 kn)

== See also ==
Aircraft of comparable role, configuration, and era

- LET L-13 Blaník
- Schleicher ASK 13
- CVT M-200

Related lists

- List of gliders
