= SZD-10 Czapla =

Polish two-seat training glider, 1953

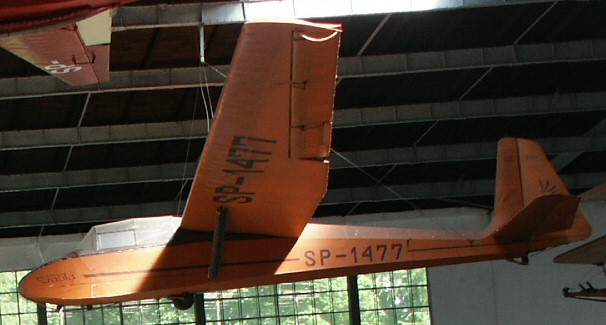
- SZD-10bis in the Polish Aviation Museum

General information
- Type: Glider aircraft
- National origin: Poland
- Manufacturer: SZD
- Designer: Roman Zatwarnicki, Irena Kaniewska, Marian Gracz
- Primary user: Poland
- Number built: 157

History
- Introduction date: 1955
- First flight: 23 November 1953

The SZD-10 Czapla (Szybowcowy Zakład Doświadczalny - Glider Experimental Works) was a two-seat training glider aircraft that was designed and built in Poland from 1953.

== Development ==
The Czapla (Heron) was a tandem two-seat training glider, with a strut- supported, forward-swept, high-set wing and a welded steel tube fuselage with fabric covering. Design of the Czapla commenced in 1952 to the order of the Soldier's Friends' League paramilitary organization, to enable aeroclubs to train glider pilots in a two-seat trainee/instructor system. Main designers were Roman Zatwarnicki, Irena Kaniewska and Marian Gracz. The Czapla was designed to be launched by bungee, winch or aero-tow, and the prototype first flew on 23 November 1953, demonstrating the need for several improvements, which were introduced in the second prototype (flown on 26 March 1954) and the production model SZD-10bis Czapla. Production was carried out from 1955 at ZSLS (ZSLS - sport aviation equipment workshops) in Krosno, Wrocław, Bielsko and Poznań and the Military Repair workshop at Łódź, with Czapla being used for everyday club flying up to the early 1980s, and exported to Finland and Turkey.

== Variants ==
- SZD-10-2 Czapla – two prototypes
- SZD-10bis Czapla – 19 production aircraft
- SZD-10bis A Czapla – 136 production aircraft, first flew in June 1958

== Specifications (SZD-10bis Czapla) ==
Data from http://muzeumlotnictwa.pl/zbiory_sz.php?ido=90&w=a

General characteristics

- Crew: 1 pilot
- Capacity: 1 passenger
- Length: 8.7 m (28 ft 7 in)
- Wingspan: 16 m (52 ft 6 in)
- Height: 1.98 m (6 ft 6 in)
- Wing area: 24 m^{2} (258 sq ft)
- Aspect ratio: 10.67
- Airfoil: Göttingen 549
- Empty weight: 280 kg (617 lb)
- Gross weight: 435 kg (959 lb)

Performance

- Maximum speed: 160 km/h (99 mph, 86 kn)
- Stall speed: 48 km/h (30 mph, 26 kn)
- Maximum glide ratio: 17 at 64 km/h (40 mph/35 kts)
- Rate of sink: 0.96 m/s (189 ft/min) at 52 km/h (32 mph/28 kts)

== See also ==
Aircraft of comparable role, configuration, and era

- Schleicher Ka-4 Rhönlerche
- Schweizer SGU 2-22
