= SZD-19 Zefir =

Polish single-seat glider, 1958

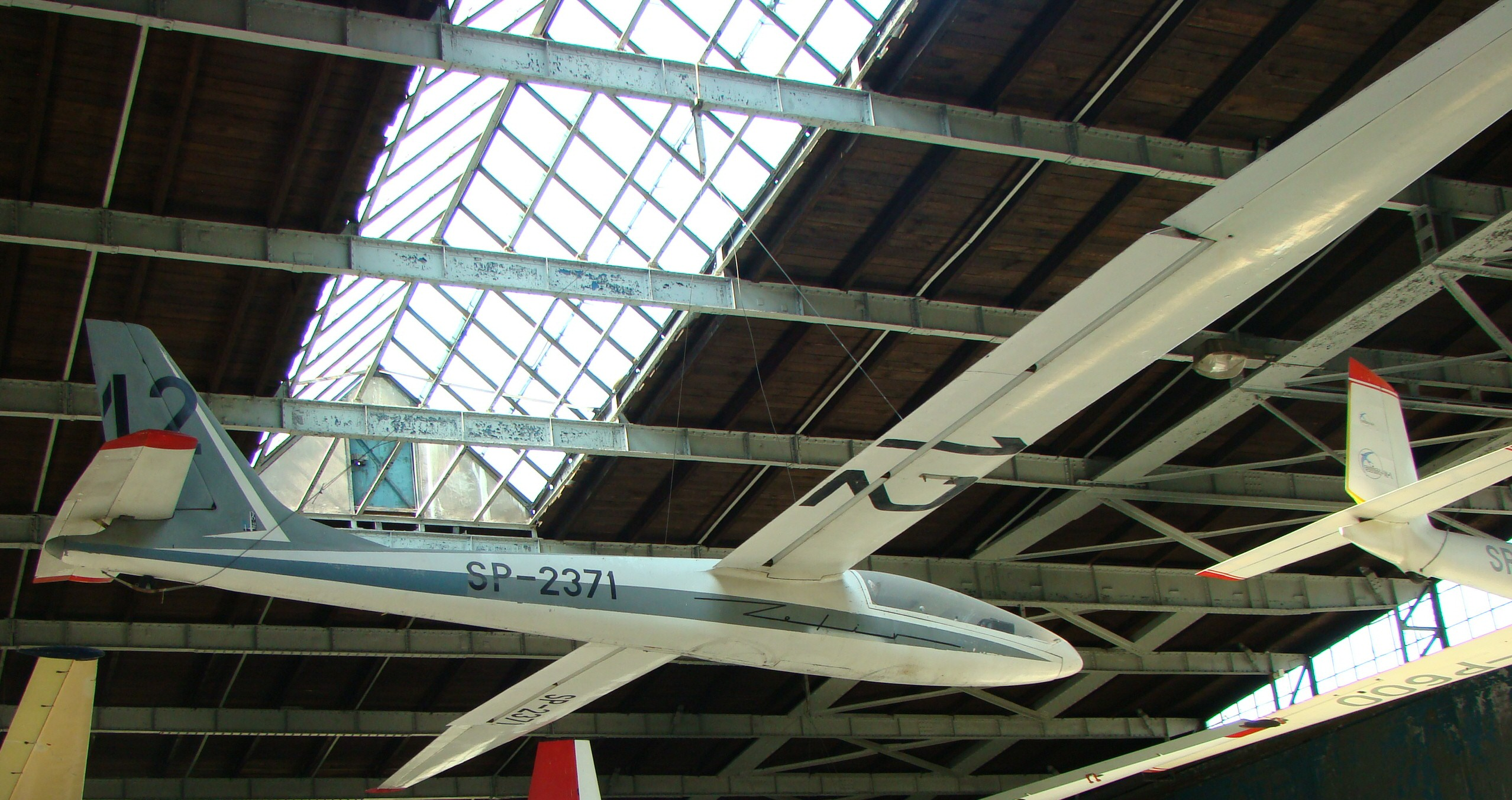
- SZD19-2A Zefir 2A in the Polish Aviation Museum

General information
- Type: Glider
- National origin: Poland
- Manufacturer: SZD
- Designer: Bogumił Szuba
- Number built: 22

History
- Introduction date: 1960
- First flight: 31 December 1958

The SZD-19 Zefir (Szybowcowy Zakład Doświadczalny - Glider Experimental Works) is a single-seat glider aircraft that was designed and built in Poland from 1957.

== Design and development ==
Although they all bore the same name, the different versions of Zefir were actually quite different gliders in terms of materials used, design and performance. What unified them most was the person of the lead designer - Bugumił Szuba and the use of large Fowler flaps to get superior (for the era) performance both at low and high-speed flight. The Zefir series (in particular Zefir-3, with its L/D of 42+) is perhaps the ultimate design of the wooden glider construction era.

Intended to replace the SZD-8 Jaskółka as the Polish team mount at the World Gliding Championships in 1958 in Leszno, the SZD-19 Zefir was a high-wing glider with a wooden and glass-fibre fuselage, retractable undercarriage and all-metal wings incorporating hydraulically actuated flaps. The first prototype SZD-19X Zefir flew on 31 December 1958, missing the 1958 championships, but the flight tests revealed problems with control and stability as well as operation of the flaps and complexity of the hydraulic system.

The SZD-19 was totally re-designed with all-wooden wings, revised fuselage and tail section, and towing hook relocated to the retractable undercarriage chassis, designated as the SZD-19-2 Zefir 2, first flying on 11 March 1960, showing a marked improvement over the Zefir. Two prototypes of the Zefir 2 were built, flying in the 1960 World Gliding Championships at Cologne in Germany to gain second, piloted by Edward Makula, and third, piloted by Jerzy Popiel, places in the Open class. With significant success in the World Championships, the SZD-19-2 was refined with new stabilisers and landing gear to become the SZD-19-2 Zefir 2A, flying for the first time in 1962, in time for the 1963 World Championships, held in Argentina, where Makula and Popiel took first and second places. As a result of these successes, demand for the SZD-19-2 was significant with 14 units built, most being sold to other countries, (according to some sources, 20 SZD-19-2A units were constructed.). From the beginning until (and including) Zefir 3 these gliders did not have spoilers (airbrakes) - a tail chute was used. The chute drag could be controlled by the pilot (in versions 2B and 3). Several records were established by the Zefir 2A/B's, including; a flight distance of 714 km (444 mi) and a 100 km (62 mi) closed triangle speed record of 102 km/h (63.4 mph).

To improve the performance, further development with wings extended to 19 m (62 ft) was carried out as the SZD-29 Zefir 3, of which two prototypes were built, and the Open-class 19m SZD-31 Zefir 4 of which three were built. Two SZD-31 Zefir 4s competed in the 1968 World Gliding Championships at Leszno with mediocre (mainly due to the unrecognized issue of an air leak through airbrake housings) results - they took 14th and 28th place.

Because the Zefir series pushed the limits of a wooden wing construction, all construction elements were carefully designed with unusually narrow tolerance margins. Jerzy Śmielkiewicz (of the design team) describes a catastrophic in-flight wing failure of one of Zefir's caused by a careless minor change of the design of a few rivet placements - the whole original design was accounting for forces resulting from and/or involving individual rivets.

== Handling characteristics ==
Historical accounts report that all the Zefir versions required superior piloting abilities but the modern restoration aircraft is reported to be docile. Until Zefir 4 they had no airbrakes (spoilers) which had caused multiple landing incidents. A chute (except Zefir 4) was used for braking, from 2B version the pilot could adjust the chute drag. The forward visibility was considered poor. Similarly, the controls required substantial force, were causing strain for the pilots and in general their ergonomics was not optimal.

All these inconveniences were the result of the design striving to squeeze every possible bit of performance (hence i.e. narrow cockpit with uncomfortably prone pilot position), handling comfort was considered second. One of the test pilots (Jan Gawęcki) recalls that the introduction of airbrakes in the Zefir 4 model was welcomed by the pilots, despite their dreadful influence (L/D down to 34 from 43+) on glider performance. Also, Zefir 3 had substantial horizontal stabilizer flutter issues.

== Variants ==
- SZD-19x Zefir

The first prototype with metal wings and hydraulically actuated flaps, one built

- SZD-19-2 Zefir 2

Two prototypes of re-designed Zefir with wooden wings, manual flap operation and other improvements. Took second and third places in the 1960 World Gliding Championships - Open class

- SZD-19-2 Zefir 2A

Production version of the Zefir 2 with minor improvements, 14 built

- SZD-19-2 Zefir 2B

Designation change after modification to allow the pilot to control/adjust the braking force of the tail chute

- SZD-29 Zefir 3

With a 19 m (62 ft) wing this Zefir was optimised for long-distance high-speed flight with minimum sink of 0.66 m/s (2.2 ft/s) at 100 km/h (62 mph) and L/D of 42+ at 84 km/h (52 mph). The first prototype (SP-2465) flew on 26 April 1965, piloted by Stanisław Skrzydlewski. A second prototype was also built. Considered by some to be the crowning achievement in wooden construction glider design.

- SZD-31 Zefir 4

An attempted refinement of the Zefir 3, with similar dimensions. Introduced spoilers caused drastically inferior performance (L/D down to 34 due to leakage through the spoiler box). Three aircraft were built.

== Specifications (SZD-19-2 Zefir 2) ==
Data from The World's Sailplanes:Die Segelflugzeuge der Welt:Les Planeurs du Monde Volume II

General characteristics

- Crew: 1
- Length: 7.07 m (23 ft 2 in)
- Wingspan: 17 m (55 ft 9 in)
- Height: 0.76 m (2 ft 6 in) at cockpit
- Wing area: 14 m^{2} (150 sq ft)
- Aspect ratio: 20.6
- Airfoil: NACA 63_{2}515 mod.
- Empty weight: 295 kg (650 lb) equipped
- Gross weight: 405 kg (893 lb)

Performance

- Stall speed: 62 km/h (39 mph, 33 kn) with 10° flaps, 71 km/h (44 mph; 38 kn) clean
- Never exceed speed: 220 km/h (140 mph, 120 kn)
- Rough air speed max: 130 km/h (81 mph; 70 kn)
- Aerotow speed: 130 km/h (81 mph; 70 kn)
- Terminal velocity: with tail parachute 190 km/h (120 mph; 100 kn)
- g limits: +5.5 -3.5 at 152.5 km/h (94.8 mph; 82.3 kn)
- Maximum glide ratio: 35 at 95 km/h (59 mph; 51 kn)
- Rate of sink: 0.72 m/s (142 ft/min) at 87 km/h (54 mph; 47 kn)
- Wing loading: 28.9 kg/m^{2} (5.9 lb/sq ft)

== See also ==
Aircraft of comparable role, configuration, and era

- Schempp-Hirth SHK

Related lists

- List of gliders
