= SZD-24 Foka =

Polish single-seat glider, 1960

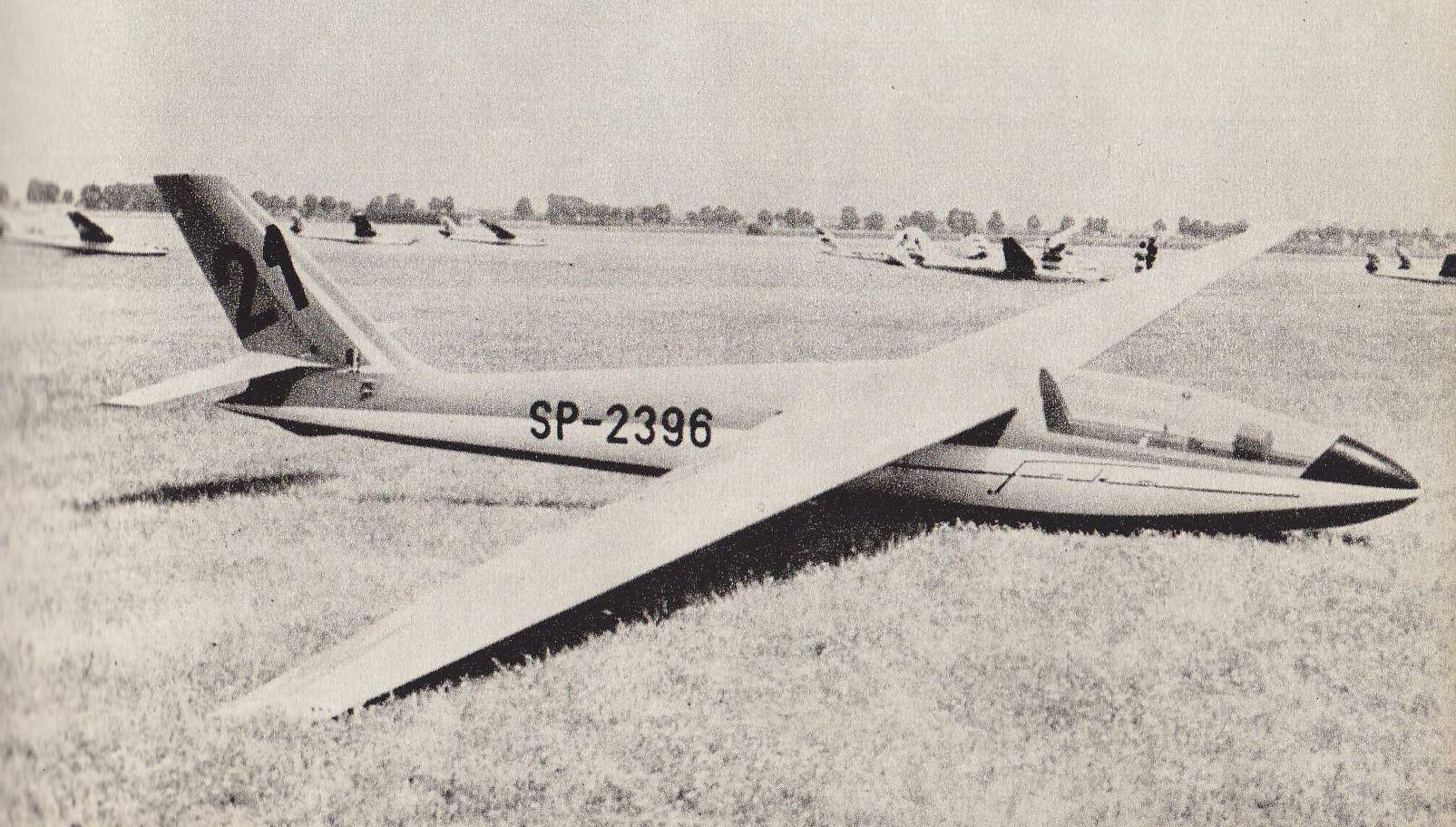

General information
- Type: Glider
- National origin: Poland
- Manufacturer: SZD
- Designer: Piotr Mynarski & Władysław Okarmus
- Number built: 204 SZD-24 + 132 SZD-32

History
- First flight: 2 May 1960

The SZD-24 Foka (Seal) (Szybowcowy Zakład Doświadczalny - Glider Experimental Works) was a single-seat high-performance aerobatic glider designed and built in Poland in 1960.

== Development ==
The SZD-24 Foka was designed for competition flying in the 'Standard' class as well as aerobatic flying. The design originated from a design competition within SZD which was won by the ”Delfin”, to become the SZD-24 Foka in production. The first flight, by SP-2069, took place in May 1960 at Bielsko but results were not good with poorly performing airbrakes which were unable to limit the airspeed below V_{NE} (Velocity Never Exceed). This posed a problem as OSTIV (Organisation Scientifique et Technique Internationale du Vol à Voile – International Scientific and technical organisation for gliding) rules for the Standard class in gliding competitions stipulate that speed limiting devices must limit maximum speed to V_{NE} or below.

A second prototype was quickly built, fitted with much improved air-brakes as well as improved canopy locks and an additional access panel in the rear fuselage. Adam Zientek carried out the first flight of the second prototype on 24 May 1960 which went on to take third place in the 'Standard' class at the 1960 World Gliding Championships at Köln in Germany, piloted by Adam Witek. The SZD-24 Foka prototype was much admired for its performance, elegance, aerodynamically clean lines and comfortable semi reclined flying position. The pre-production variant, called SZD-24A, introduced more refinements and the line was steadily improved up to the SZD-32 Foka 5 final production variant.

== Description (SZD-24-4A ) ==
The SZD-24 Foka series were Standard class gliders of predominantly wooden construction with fixed wheel and skid undercarriage.

=== Fuselage ===
The fuselage comprised a wooden structure with the cockpit in the extreme nose transitioning with very clean lines to the integral fin at the rear. The forward opening canopy was jettisonable in case of emergency and comprising plexiglass clear portions fitted to a 'Duralumin' frame. A 300 mm × 125 mm (11.8 in × 4.9 in) mainwheel, with mechanically operated brakes connected to the airbrake lever, was fitted in a semi recessed position augmented by flush fitting skids under the nose and tail. The construction methods of the fuselage evolved throughout the series culminating in large panels, formed in concrete moulds, of plywood and PVC foam sandwich giving a very smooth finish, high strength and reduced weight. The pilot sat semi-reclined in an adjustable back-rest seat with headrest and non-adjustable rudder pedals.

The instrument panel sits on a column above and between the pilots legs, with basic instruments and supplementary instruments as required. A single tow hook is fitted to the left of the nose-skid with a release control cable operated by a control knob at the base of the instrument panel. The forward sliding canopy comprised the entire top half of the forward fuselage which slid forward, on runners, controlled by a knob in a track on the left side of the cockpit rim. The canopy was constructed around a 'Duralumin' frame with 'Plexiglas' transparent section and moulded opaque nose section.

=== Wings ===
The trapezoidal wings were built up with heavy gauge moulded plywood skins, supported by wooden ribs, using NACA 63_{3}-618 at the root changing smoothly to NACA 4415 at the tip. Large metal plate air brakes are fitted well aft of the main spar at approximately ¾ chord, in already-turbulent air flow. Roll control is provided by ailerons in the trailing edges of the outer wings. The SZD-24-2 Foka 2 was fitted with reduced area ailerons to reduce drag, but roll control was dramatically reduced.

=== Tail unit ===
The sharply swept fin (used to increase control power and stability with a smaller fuselage, reducing weight), was integral with the fuselage and supported the plywood skinned tail plane at approx ⅓ fin span. The mass balanced rudder and elevators were built up from wood/plywood and fabric covered.

=== Surface finish ===
As delivered the Foka's were given a similar surface finish, with a broad stripe, tapering from the centre-section to nose and tail, either side of the fuselage and a contrasting colour on the remainder of the fuselage. A large stylised Foka logo was added in the stripe under the cockpit. Wings were usually white with red wing tips.

== Operational history ==
The Foka was the holder of seven world records and many Polish national records including:

- 300 km (190 mi) triangle World Record @ 62.29 km/h (38.71 mph) by Pelagia Majewska in 1960
- 300 km (190 mi) triangle World Record @ 72 km/h (45 mph) by Pelagia Majewska in 1963
- 300 km (190 mi) triangle World Record @ 82.5 km/h (51.3 mph) by Adela Dankowska in 1963 (later the same day)
- World record Out and return Leszno-Olsztyn-Leszno (682 km (424 mi)) in 1964 by Jan Wróblewski
- World record free distance of 744 km (462 mi) in 1964 by Henryk Lisiecki
- First five places at the 1962 International Professional Gliding competition at Leszno in Poland.
- Simultaneous completion of a 535 km (332 mi) triangle by 34 pilots flying 'Foka's at the Polish National Gliding Championships in 1964.

Other achievements by 'Foka' aircraft include:

- Camille Labar first in the 1962 French National Gliding Championships.
- Jaques Lacheny first out of 47 in the European Cup Gliding championship.
- The Foka 4 was also the only standard class glider ever to win the open-class World Gliding Championships, in 1965 at RAF South Cerney, Gloucestershire, piloted by Jan Wróblewski; Edward Makula in a Foka 4 came fourth. Foka 4's piloted by F. Kępka and Jerzy Popiel came 3rd and 4th in the Standard class.

After several accidents attributed to structural failure, all Foka aircraft extant have now been limited to a maximum speed of 165 km/h (103 mph) in clear air and 140 km/h (87 mph) IFR/rough air. Following a fatal accident due to failure of the wing attachment mechanism in 2010 and another fatal accident with a glider with similar assembly mechanism, the British Gliding Association has issued a Safety Alert for owners of Foka IV gliders.

== Variants ==
SZD-24 Foka
The first prototype, ( SP-2069), flown on 2 May 1960, was found to be longitudinally unstable and the airbrakes incapable of limiting the speed to below V_{NE} (Velocity Never Exceed).
SZD-24A Foka A
The second prototype (SP-2070), flown on 24 May 1960 with improved structure enlarged airbrake panels, improved canopy locks and 1.5 kg of ballast in the rear fuselage. Compliant with OSTIV regulations for the Standard class, SP-2070 was flown by Adam Witek at the 1960 World Gliding Championships to third place in the Standard class.
SZD-24B Foka B
Three pre-production aircraft, (SP-2241 to SP-2243), first flown in February 1961, with canopy locks reverting to those used in the first prototype, canopy made from two sheets of plexiglas bonded along the centre-line for better visibility, large panels produced using bonded plywood / PVC foam sandwich, plywood covering increased in thickness to 2.5 mm (0.098 in), removal of the lead ballast in the tailcone, a 10% enlarged rudder area and a reinforced tailskid.
SZD-24C Foka C
Production aircraft with improved laminar flow over the nose, main-wheel moved forward 45 cm to reduce wear on the nose-skid, larger airbrakes, improvements to the instruments, KP-18 oxygen regulator and bottle fitted in the luggage compartment, and Elektron magnesium alloy castings for the flying control mountings and fittings. Foka C's were exported to 19 countries with circa 100 being built. The slightly heavier SZD-24C Foka C could fly faster for similar best L/D and minimum sink values.
SZD-24-2 Foka 2
A single SZD-24-2 Foka 2 (SP-2362) was built, incorporating attempts to reduce drag by improving laminar flow and reducing the area of the ailerons. Trials flown in 1961 showed no appreciable improvement in performance over the SZD-24C, only decreased roll response, with the time taken for rolling from 45° one way to 45° the other increasing from 2.8 seconds to 4 seconds, as well as poorer performance at speeds above 85 km/h..
SZD-24-3 Foka 3
A single glider, built, under the supervision of J . Trzeciak M.Sc., with experimental wings constructed with three laminations, remained unflown despite excellent results from static strength testing.
SZD-24-4 Foka 4
Two prototypes of the Foka 4 series were built with the fuselage and tail coming from the SZD-24C and wings, with slight modifications, from the SZD-24-2. The new wings were manufactured with graduated thickness impregnated plywood formed to shape in concrete moulds The first prototype was flown on 26 February 1962 with excellent results, proving to be easy to fly with pleasant handling characteristics and good performance, as well as effective and easy to use airbrakes. The second prototype (SP-2363) took part in the 1963 World Gliding Championships at Junin in Argentina with credible results.
SZD-24-4A Foka 4A
Production Foka 4 aircraft.
SZD-24-4 M Foka 45
Production Foka 4 aircraft. Sixteen Foka 45 aircraft took part in the 1968 World Gliding Championships at Lesno in Poland.
SZD-24-4 M Foka M
Production Foka 4 aircraft, 5 built.
SZD-32 Foka 5
Prototype of the Foka 5 with T-tail fibre-glass nose, modified NACA aerofoil section and other improvements, one built.
SZD-32A Foka 5
Production model, 131 built.

== Specifications (SZD-32a Foka5) ==
3-view drawing of SZD-24 Foka sailplane

Data from The World's Sailplanes:Die Segelflugzeuge der Welt:Les Planeurs du Monde Volume II

General characteristics

- Crew: One
- Length: 7 m (23 ft 0 in)
- Wingspan: 15 m (49 ft 3 in)
- Height: 0.86 m (2 ft 10 in) at cockpit
- Wing area: 12.16 m^{2} (130.9 sq ft)
- Aspect ratio: 18.5
- Airfoil: Root: NACA 63_{3}-618, Mid: NACA 63_{3}-618 (mod.), NACA 4415 (mod.)
- Empty weight: 245 kg (540 lb)
- Gross weight: 385 kg (849 lb)

Performance

- Stall speed: 62 km/h (39 mph, 33 kn)
- Never exceed speed: 260 km/h (160 mph, 140 kn)
- Rough air speed max: 160 km/h (99 mph)
- Aerotow speed: 140 km/h (87 mph)
- Terminal velocity: with full airbrakes 255 km/h (158 mph)
- g limits: +6 -3 at 146 km/h (91 mph)
- Maximum glide ratio: 34
- Rate of sink: 0.66 m/s (130 ft/min) at 75 km/h (47 mph)
- Wing loading: 25.7 kg/m^{2} (5.3 lb/sq ft)

== See also ==
Aircraft of comparable role, configuration, and era

- Slingsby T.51 Dart 15
