= SZD-15 Sroka =

Polish single-seat glider, 1956

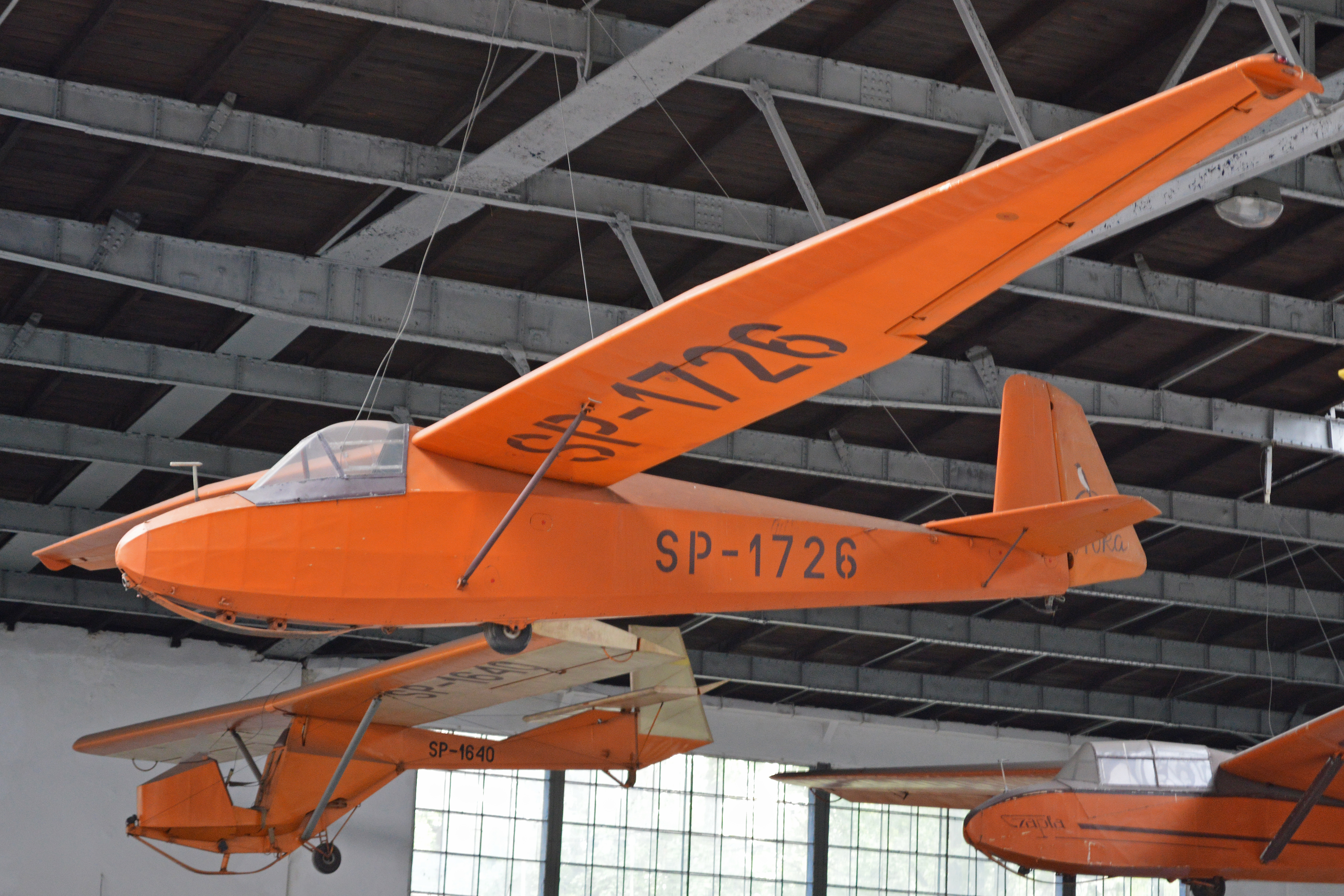
- SZD-15A Sroka in the Polish Aviation Museum

General information
- Type: Glider aircraft
- National origin: Poland
- Manufacturer: ZSLS Nr. 5 Krosno
- Designer: Zbigniew Badura
- Primary user: Polish Aero Club
- Number built: 22

History
- First flight: 25 February 1956
- Retired: 1970s
- Developed from: IS-B Komar

The SZD-15 Sroka (Szybowcowy Zakład Doświadczalny - Glider Experimental Works) was a single-seat glider designed and built in Poland in 1956.

== Development ==
The SZD-15 Sroka (Magpie) was designed as a replacement for the IS-B Komar in the single-seat trainer role, at the request of the LPŻ (Soldier's Friends League) from 1955. Of typical wooden construction with plywood or fabric covering, the SZD-15 Sroka was typical of many contemporary club training gliders throughout Europe. The main designer on the project was Z. Badura.

The first prototype, named 'Pionier' (registration SP-1598) was flown on 25 February 1956 by Stanisław Skrzydlewski at Bielsko, leading to modifications to improve the room in the cockpit, re-position the winch launch hook to increase directional stability during winch launching, and to increase the strength of the forward fuselage. Further improvements were made to the second prototype, SZD-15-2 Sroka (registration SP-1667), which flew on 1 February 1957. Production aircraft were designated SZD-15A, and 20 were built in ZSLS in Krosno, in addition to the two prototypes.

The flying characteristics of the SZD-15A were a marked improvement on those of the IS-B Komar, including better climb performance in weak thermals. The solo training regime employed by Polish Aero Clubs up to the late 1950s was eventually proven to be inefficient, thus the 'raison d'etre' of the SZD-15 Sroka was removed, and the remaining SZD-15s were used as club single seaters until superseded by higher performance club aircraft in the mid-1970s. Two, including the first prototype, are preserved in the Polish Aviation Museum in Kraków.

== Variants ==
SZD-15 Pioneer - the first prototype, registration SP-1598.
SZD-15-2 Sroka - the second prototype with modifications.
SZD-15A Sroka - production aircraft, 20 built.

== Specifications (SZD-15 Sroka) ==
Data from http://www.piotrp.de/SZYBOWCE/pszd15.htm

General characteristics

- Crew: 1
- Length: 6.9 m (22 ft 8 in)
- Wingspan: 14.5 m (47 ft 7 in)
- Height: 1.5 m (4 ft 11 in)
- Wing area: 14.5 m^{2} (156 sq ft)
- Aspect ratio: 14.5
- Airfoil: NACA 43012A
- Empty weight: 170 kg (375 lb)
- Gross weight: 270 kg (595 lb)

Performance

- Maximum speed: 200 km/h (120 mph, 110 kn)
- Stall speed: 49 km/h (30 mph, 26 kn)
- Maximum glide ratio: 19 at 64 km/h (35 kts/40 mph)
- Rate of sink: 0.88 m/s (173 ft/min) at 58 km/h (31 kts/36 mph)

== See also ==
Aircraft of comparable role, configuration, and era

- Slingsby T.30 Prefect
