= SZD-6X Nietoperz =

Polish single-seat tail-less research glider, 1951

SZD-6x Nietoperz
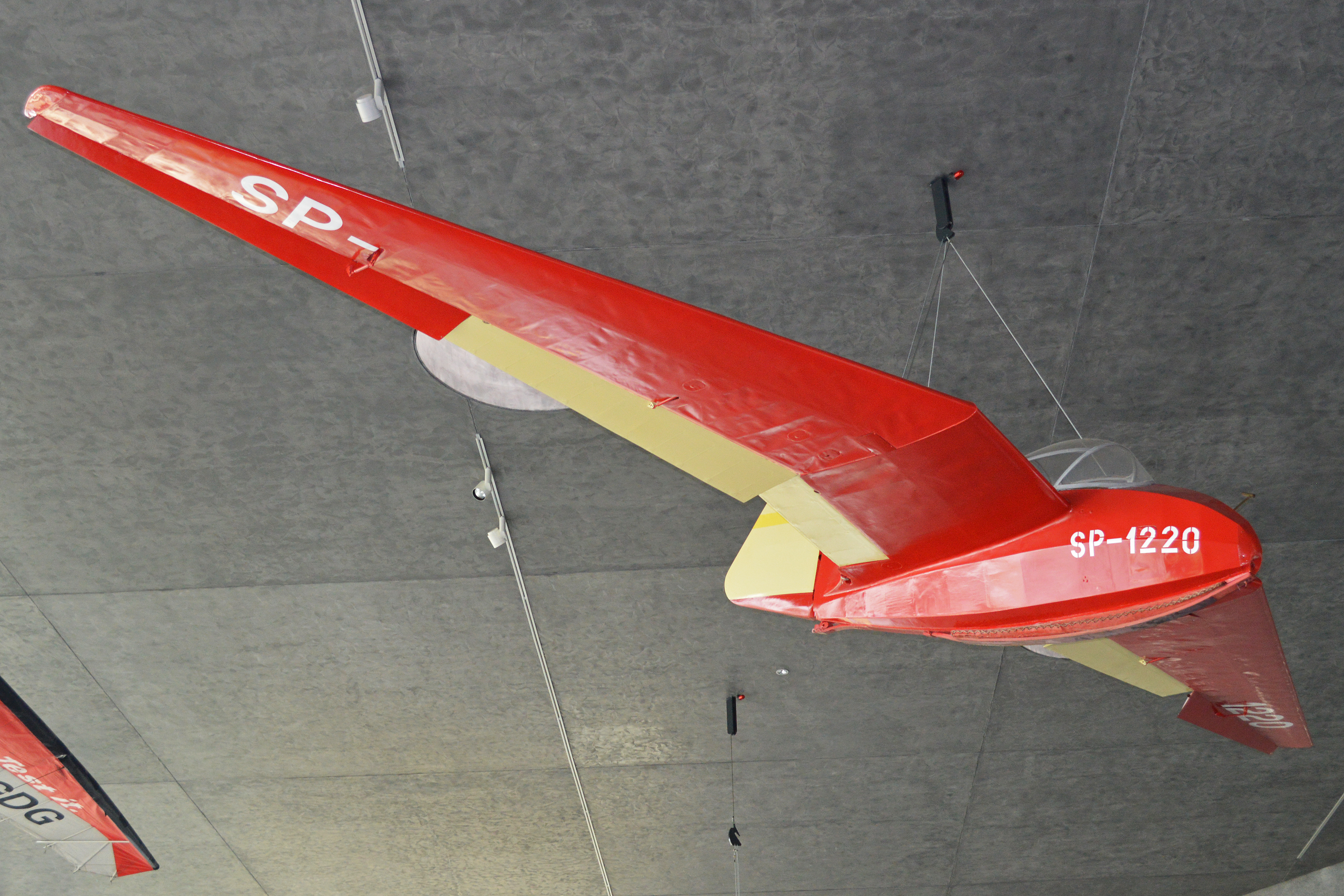
- SZD-6x Nietoperz in the Polish Aviation Museum (SP-1220)

General information
- Type: Glider aircraft
- National origin: Poland
- Manufacturer: SZD
- Status: Displayed in museum
- Number built: 1

History
- Introduction date: 1952
- First flight: 2 February 1951
- Retired: 1964

The SZD-6x Nietoperz was a single-seat tail-less experimental glider aircraft that was designed and built in Poland at Szybowcowy Zakład Doświadczalny (Glider Experimental Works) in Bielsko-Biała in 1951. Only one example was constructed (with registration SP-1220).

== Development ==
The SZD-6x Nietoperz (Bat) was designed and built to research tail-less aircraft, and the control of them. Main designers were Władysław Nowakowski and Justyn Sandauer. Built in a conventional fashion using wood throughout, fabric covering and steel for highly stressed parts and fittings the SZD-6x was a cantilever monoplane with the cranked wing attached to a short fuselage pod at the mid position. The inner portion of each wing was markedly swept forward out to approx. quarter-span, where the swept-back outer wing panels were attached. This is arrangement allowed for maximum distance between the centre of gravity and the vertical stabilizer, and placed the pilot at the centre of gravity, so that differing pilot weights had little impact on stability.

The first 'hop' was made on 5 January 1951 at Bielsko to test control effectiveness and stability. For more comprehensive trials the glider was transported to Katowice airfield which suffered less turbulence from high ground. On 12 January 1951, the pilot Adam Zientek took an exploratory aero-tow behind a PWS-26 piloted by T. Hill, which nearly ended in disaster. The SZD-6x suffered PIOs (pilot induced oscillations) while still at low altitude over the airfield, hit the ground hard and was damaged. The first "real" flight took place on 2 February 1951, flown by A. Zientek. Later flights were completed successfully, but all the pilots agreed that the aircraft was not suitable for production due to inherent control problems.

The control system of the SZD-6x was designed to allow the aircraft to be flown with several different control configurations. The trailing edges of the wings carried three surfaces each, all of which could be linked to form elevons or operated individually as ailerons, elevators or flaps. The metal-skinned split ailerons, (the outboard control surfaces), also formed the airbrakes, opening out to give increased drag. The ailerons/airbrakes could be connected to the rudder pedals to be used as drag rudders, similar to the drag rudders used on the Northrop flying wings. The inboard control surfaces on the swept ford section of trailing edge were typically used for trimming purposes deflecting 10° up or down.

The controls were tested in three configurations:

1. With pitch control provided by all four elevons, roll by the split ailerons (operating together), speed / approach control by split ailerons / airbrakes and yaw controlled by the rudder. In this configuration the aircraft proved to be stable in pitch, being able to be flown hands-off during aero-tow, and pitch could be controlled simply by the pilot leaning forwards or backwards to adjust the centre of gravity. Lateral stability was noted to be poor to fair but acceptable and the aircraft was safe and capable of flying simple aerobatics.
2. As above for pitch and roll, but with the rudder locked and the pedals operating the ailerons / airbrakes differentially for yaw, lateral control prove barely adequate.
3. As in 2 but with the rudder removed. This configuration was inherently dangerous as any application of ailerons gave instant adverse yaw, and pitch and roll in the opposite direction to that intended.

The prototype was used in the SZD for experimental purpose between 18 April 1952 and 26 February 1964, and it also took part in several air shows, even performing aerobatics. With the interesting flying characteristics of the SZD-6x most pilots were not keen to fly the aircraft but Adam Zientek persevered for some time before the aircraft was retired to the Kraków Aviation Museum in 1964.

== Specifications ==
Data from The World's Sailplanes:Die Segelflugzeuge der Welt:Les Planeurs du Monde Volume II

General characteristics

- Crew: 1
- Length: 4.05 m (13 ft 3 in)
- Wingspan: 12 m (39 ft 4 in)
- Height: 1.3 m (4 ft 3 in) at cockpit
- Wing area: 14.4 m^{2} (155 sq ft)
- Aspect ratio: 10
- Airfoil: NACA 23012
- Empty weight: 150 kg (331 lb)
- Gross weight: 235 kg (518 lb)

Performance

- Stall speed: 65 km/h (40 mph, 35 kn)
- Never exceed speed: 300 km/h (190 mph, 160 kn)
- Rough air speed max: 195 km/h (121 mph; 105 kn)
- Aerotow speed: 170 km/h (110 mph; 92 kn)
- g limits: +6.5 -3 at 138 km/h (86 mph; 75 kn)
- Maximum glide ratio: 17.5 at 90 km/h (56 mph; 49 kn)
- Rate of sink: 1.35 m/s (266 ft/min) at 80 km/h (50 mph; 43 kn)
- Wing loading: 18.7 kg/m^{2} (3.8 lb/sq ft)

== See also ==
Aircraft of comparable role, configuration, and era

- Fauvel AV.36
