= List of gliders (S) =

This is a list of gliders/sailplanes of the world, (this reference lists all gliders with references, where available) Note: Any aircraft can glide for a short time, but gliders are designed to glide for longer.

== S ==
=== SABCA ===
(SABCA - Société Anonyme Belge de Construction Aéronautique)

- SABCA Junior
- SABCA Jullien SJ-1 – Henri Jullien / SABCA

=== Sablier ===
(Georges Sablier)

- Sablier 1922
- Sablier 1923 Hyper-léger
- Sablier S-01
- Sablier S-03
- Sablier S-07 1930 Aile volante
- Sablier S-08
- Sablier S-10
- Sablier S-11
- Sablier S-14
- Sablier S-14 bis
- Sablier S-16
- Sablier S-18
- Sablier S-19
- Sablier S-19 Biplace
- Sablier Type 19 Biplace Motoplaneur 1935 Motoplaneur
- Sablier Type 19A 1935
- Sablier S-20
- Sablier S-21 1930
- Sablier S-23
- Sablier S-24 Démontable
- Sablier S-26
- Sablier S-26 Hydro
- Sablier S-28 1930
- Sablier S-32 1930
- Sablier S-36 1930
- Sablier S-52 Motoplaneur
- Sablier Type Enseignement Biplace
- Sablier Type Enseignement Ecole
- Sablier Type Enseignement Performance
- Sablier Type Grand Sport
- Sablier Type Montevideo 1936
- Sablier de Rouge
- Sablier Ecole-E
- Sablier GS-11
- Sablier Perfo-E
- Sablier Sport

=== Saboureault-Boussiere-Touza ===
(Paul Saboureault, Edouard Boussiere & Joseph Touza)

- Saboureault-Boussiere-Touza SBT

=== SAI-Ambrosini ===
- SAI-Ambrosini CVV-6 Cangaro
- SAI-Ambrosini CVV-7 Pinocchio
- SAI-Ambrosini CVV-8 Bonaventura

=== Sailplane Corporation of America ===
- Sailplane BG-6
- Sailplane BG-8

=== Sala ===
(Ditta Sala - firm Sala)

- Sala N-1

=== Salavieju ===
(V. Šalaviejus)

- Salaviejus Aitvaras
- Salavejus primary

=== Saloni ===
(Bronisław Saloni)

- Saloni 1910 Glider

=== SALS ===
(Service de l'Aviation Légère et Sportive en Algérie)

- SALS DACAL 105
- SALS DACAL 106

=== Sancho ===
(Orfeo Sancho, Francisco Huguenin, José Huguenin & Víctor Ruiz)

- Sancho Primario

=== Sandlin ===
(Mike Sandlin)

- Sandlin Bug
- Sandlin Goat
- Sandlin Pig

=== Sands ===
(Ron Sands Sr.)

- Sands Replica 1929 Primary Glider

=== Sato Maeda ===
(Hiroshi Sato & Keniti Maeda)

- Sato ASO-1
- Sato Kyutei-5
- Sato Kyutei-7
- Sato Maeda 1 – (佐藤・前田1号(九帝l号))
- Sato Maeda 2 – (佐藤・前田2号(九帝E号))
- Sato Maeda 3 – (九帝3型(十文字号))
- Sato Maeda BS
- Sato Maeda E – (佐藤・前田E号(九帝E号))
- Sato TC – built by Ito
- Sato Maeda SM-206

=== Saucède ===
(Lucien & Pierre Saucède)

- Saucède PLS-1

=== Saurma-Jeltsch ===
(Johann Friedrich Maria Eberhard Sylvius von Saurma - Graf von Saurma-Jeltsch)

- Saurma-Jeltsch motor-glider

=== Savoyas ===
(Laurent Savoyas)

- Savoyas Hirondelle
- Sayers SCW – Sayers, W. H. & Courtney, & Wright – Central Aircraft Company* Sayers SCW – Sayers, W. H. & Courtney, & Wright – Central Aircraft Company

(W. H. Sayers, Courtney & Wright / Central Aircraft Company)

- Sayers SCW

=== Scanlan ===
(Thomas W. Scanlan)

- Scanlan SG-1A

=== SCAP-Lanaverre ===
(SCAP - Société de Commercialisation Aéronautique du Plessis SàRL with Lanaverre Industries)

- SCAP-Lanaverre CS-II Cirrus
- SCAP-Lanaverre SL-2 Janus

=== Scheibe ===
- Scheibe Mü 13E Bergfalke
- Scheibe Bergfalke II/55
- Scheibe Bergfalke III
- Scheibe Bergfalke IV
- Scheibe Specht
- Scheibe Sperber
- Scheibe Spatz
- Scheibe L-Spatz 55
- Scheibe Zugvogel (multiple subtypes)
- Scheibe SF-24 Motorspatz
- Scheibe SF 25 Falke
- Scheibe SF 25E Super-Falke
- Scheibe SF-26 Super Spatz
- Scheibe SF 27
- Scheibe SF 27M
- Scheibe SF 28 Tandem-Falke
- Scheibe SF 30 Club Spatz
- Sportavia-Pützer SFS 31 Milan
- Scheibe SF 32
- Scheibe SF 33
- Scheibe SF 34 Delphin
- Scheibe SF 36
- Scheibe SF 40 Mini Falke
- Scheibe SF 41 Merlin

=== Schempp-Hirth ===
(Schempp-Hirth Flugzeugbau GmbH)

- Göppingen Gö 1 Wolf
- Göppingen Gö 2
- Göppingen Gö 3 Minimoa
- Göppingen Gö 4 Gövier
- Göppingen Gö 5
- Schempp-Hirth Arcus
- Standard Austria
- Schempp-Hirth Cirrus
- Schempp-Hirth Discus
- Schempp-Hirth Discus 2
- Schempp-Hirth Duo Discus
- Schempp-Hirth Janus
- Schempp-Hirth Mini-Nimbus
- Schempp-Hirth Nimbus
- Schempp-Hirth Nimbus 2
- Schempp-Hirth Nimbus 3
- Schempp-Hirth Nimbus 3D
- Schempp-Hirth Nimbus 3DM
- Schempp-Hirth Nimbus 3DT
- Schempp-Hirth Nimbus 4
- Schempp-Hirth Quintus
- Schempp-Hirth SHK
- Schempp-Hirth Standard Cirrus
- Schempp-Hirth Ventus
- Schempp-Hirth Ventus 2
- Schempp-Hirth Ventus 3

=== Scherler ===
(Hermann Scherler / SG Biel)

- Scherler HS-1

=== Schleicher ===
(Alexander Schleicher GmbH & Co)

- Schleicher Hols der Teufel
- Schleicher EW 18
- Schleicher Luftkurort Poppenhausen
- Schleicher Rhönadler
- Schleicher Rhönbussard
- Schleicher Rhönlerche
- Schleicher Ka-2 Rhönschwalbe
- Schleicher Ka-3 (a.k.a. Kaiser Ka-3)
- Schleicher Ka-4 Rhönlerche II
- Schleicher Ka-6 Rhönsegler
- Schleicher Ka-6E
- Schleicher Ka-7
- Schleicher K7/13
- Schleicher Ka-8
- Schleicher Ka-9
- Schleicher Ka-10
- Schleicher ASW 12
- Schleicher ASK 13
- Schleicher ASK 14 (Ka 12 renamed)
- Schleicher ASW 15
- Schleicher ASK 16
- Schleicher ASW 17
- Schleicher ASK 18
- Schleicher ASW 19
- Schleicher ASW 20
- Schleicher ASK 21
- Schleicher ASW 22
- Schleicher ASK 23
- Schleicher ASW 24
- Schleicher ASH 25
- Schleicher ASH 26
- Schleicher ASW 27
- Schleicher ASW 28
- Schleicher ASG 29
- Schleicher ASH 30 Mi
- Schleicher ASH 31 Mi
- Schleicher ASG 32
- Schleicher AS 33
- Schleicher AS 34Me
- Schleicher AS 35

=== Šlechta ===
- Šlechta PB.3 Praha

=== Schmid ===
(Jaromír Schmid)

- Schmid S-1
- Schmid S-3

=== Schmid ===
(M. Schmid)

- Schmid MS-4
- Schmid MS-5

=== Schmutzhart ===
(Berthold Schmutzhart)

- Schmutzhart SCH-1

=== Schneider ===
(Grunau Riesengebirge / Flugzeugbau Schneider / Edmund Schneider Grünau (ESG))

- Grunau ESG 29
- Schneider ESG 31 Schlesierland
- Schneider Stanavo
- Schneider SG-38 Schulgleiter
- Schneider Grünau Commodore
- Schneider Grunau 6
- Schneider Grünau 7 Moazagotl
- Schneider Grünau 8
- Schneider Grunau 9
- Schneider Grunau Baby
- Schneider Grunau Baby II
- Schneider Grunau Baby IIa
- Schneider Grunau Baby IIb
- Schneider Grunau Baby III
- Schneider Grunau Baby 3
- Schneider Grunau Baby 4
- Schneider Grunau Baby V
- Schneider TG-27 Grunau Baby
- Schneider SM-5
- Schneider Motorbaby
- Schneider ES-49 Wallaby
- Schneider ES-49b Kangaroo
- Schneider ES-50 Club Two-Seater
- Schneider ES-52 Kookaburra
- Schneider ES-54 Gnome
- Schneider ES-56 Nymph
- Schneider ES-57 Kingfisher
- Schneider ES-59 Arrow
- Schneider ES-60 Boomerang
- Schneider ES-60B Super Arrow
- Schneider ES-65 Platypus
- Edelweiss-Baby (Oberlerchner, Spittal)

=== Schreder ===
(Richard Schreder)

- Schreder HP-7
- Schreder Airmate HP-8
- Schreder Airmate HP-9
- Schreder Airmate HP-10
- Schreder Airmate HP-11
- Schreder HP-12
- Schreder HP-12A
- Schreder HP-13
- Schreder HP-14
- Schreder HP-15
- Schreder RS-15
- Schreder HP-16
- Schreder HP-17
- Schreder HP-18
- Schreder HP-19
- Schreder HP-20
- Schreder HP-21
- Schreder HP-22

=== Schröder-Peters ===
(Josef Schröder & Josef & Heinz Peters / Flugzeugbau Köhler/Peters)

- Schröder-Peters SP-1 V1

=== Schubert ===
(Ekkehard Carlos Fernando Schubert & Sorocaba Tecsis)

- Schubert P-1

=== Schul-Marczinski ===
- Schul-Marczinski Stadt Magdeburg

=== Schultz ===
- Schultz ABC
- Schultz TG-16
- Schultz Nucleon

=== Schulz ===
(Ferdinand Schulz)

- Schulz FS-1
- Schulz FS-3 Besenstie
- Schulz FS-5
- Schulz Königin Luise

=== Schwarzwald ===
(Schwarzwald Flugzeugbau Donaueschingen GmbH)

- Schwarzwald Strolch (RLM 108-62)
- Schwarzwald Ibis (RLM 108-64)

=== Schweizer ===
(Schweizer Aircraft Corporation) Note: Schweizer glider designations are in the format n-nn. The first number denotes the number of seats and the second number is the model number)

- Schweizer SGP 1-1
- Schweizer SGU 1-2
- Schweizer SGU 1-3
- Schweizer SGU 1-6
- Schweizer SGU 1-7
- Schweizer SGS 2-8
- Schweizer SGC 8-10 (alternative designation for the SGC 9-10)
- Schweizer SGC 9-10
- Schweizer SGC 15-11
- Schweizer SGS 2-12
- Schweizer SGC 6-14
- Schweizer SGC 1-15
- Schweizer SGU 1-16
- Schweizer SGS 1-17
- Schweizer SGS 2-18
- Schweizer SGU 1-19
- Schweizer SGU 1-20
- Schweizer SGS 1-21
- Schweizer SGU 2-22
- Schweizer SGS 1-23
- Schweizer SGS 1-24
- Schweizer SGS 2-25
- Schweizer SGS 1-26
- Schweizer 2-27
- Schweizer 7-28
- Schweizer SGS 1-29
- Schweizer SA 1-30
- Schweizer 2-31
- Schweizer SGS 2-32
- Schweizer SGS 2-33
- Schweizer SGS 1-34
- Schweizer SGS 1-35
- Schweizer SGS 1-36 Sprite
- Schweizer SGM 2-37
- Schweizer TG-2
- Schweizer TG-3
- Schweizer TG-7A
- Schweizer RG-8A
- Schweizer X-26 Frigate
- Schweizer LNS
- Schweizer cargo glider designs

=== Scott ===
(Scott Light Aircraft Ltd / W.R. Scott)

- Scott Viking 1
- Scott Viking 2
- Scott Hütter 17

=== Scrive-Coquard ===
(Didier Scrive & Marcel Coquard)

- Scrive 1908 glider
- Scrive-Coquard SC

=== SCSA ===
(Southern California Soaring Association)

- SCSA Stratosailplane I
- SCSA Stratosailplane II

=== Searby ===
(H. A. Searby)

- Searby Special

=== Seehase ===
(Hans Seehase)

- Seehase MD-2

=== Segelflugzeugwerke ===
(Segelflugzeugwerke GmbH, Baden-Baden)

- Baden-Baden Stolz – Friedrich Wenk
- Bremen – Alexander Lippisch & F. Stamer
- Feldberg – Friedrich Wenk
- Hols der Teufel – Alexander Lippisch & F. Stamer
- Roland Festung – R. Eisenlohr

=== Segno ===
(Henryk Segno)

- Segno 1910 glider

=== Seiler ===
(E. Seiler)

- Seiler D-1

=== Sekcja Lotnicza ===
(Warsaw technical university Aviation Section)

- S.L.1 Akar
- S.L.2 Czarny Kot (Black Cat) No.6 (a.k.a. J.D.1)
- S.L.3 No.3
- S.L.4 (a.k.a. JD.2)

=== Sellars-Jordan ===
(J. L. Sellars & K. Jordan)

- Sellars-Jordan KJS-1

=== Sellers ===
(Matthew B. Sellers)

- Sellers 1908 Quadruplane glider

=== Senbergas ===
(V. Senbergas)

- Senbergas S-1

=== Sergiuz Czerwiński ===
(Sergiuz Czerwiński)

- Sergiuz Czerwiński glider

=== Sevimia ===
(Société d'Études Victor Minié Aéronautiques / Victor Minié Aviation)

- Sevimia SM-20

=== Shackleton ===
(William Stancliffe Shackleton)

- Shackleton Lark

=== Sheremetyev ===
(Boris Nikolayevich Sheremetyev)

- Sheremetyev SH-03
- Sheremetyev SH-04 Temp
- Sheremetyev SH-05
- Sheremetyev SH-08
- Sheremetyev SH-10
- Sheremetyev SH-16
- Sheremetyev SH-17
- Sheremetyev SH-18
- Sheremetyev XXX Let
- Sheremetyev-Kochetkov Oktyabrenok – Boris Nikolayevich Sheremetyev & Kochetkov

=== Shorts ===
(Short Brothers)

- Short Nimbus
- Short SA.9 – Air Ministry Specification X.30/46
- Short SB.1

=== SIAI-Marchetti ===
- SIAI-Marchetti Eolo 3V-1

=== Sidou ===
(Antonio Menezes Sidou)

- Sidou João Grande

=== Siebert ===
(Wilhelm Kurten / Paul Siebert, Mariendorferstrasse 38, 44 Münster)

- Siebert Sie-3 (a.k.a. Kurten Sie-3)

=== Siegel ===
(Mieczysław Siegel)

- Siegel MS-01
- Siegel MS-02
- Siegel MS-03
- Siegel MS-04
- Siegel MS-08 Wróbel
- Siegel MS-09 Wróbel II
- Siegel MS-10 Wróbel III
- Siegel MS-11
- Siegel MS-12
- Siegel MS-13 Bocian
- Siegel MS-14
- Siegel Skrzydlaty Rower 1911

=== Silva ===
(C. Silva / Aeronautica Lombarda)

- Silva AL-3

=== Siren SA ===
- Siren C30S Edelweiss
- Siren C34S Edelweiss 4
- Siren E-75 Sagittaire
- Siren E-78 Silène
- Siren PIK-30

=== Slamka-Plesko ===
(Rudolf Slamka & Štefan Plesko)

- Slamka-Plesko SP-II Osa

=== SLCA ===
(Société Lorraine de Constructions Aéronautique)

- SLCA KV.1
- SLCA-10 Topaze
- SLCA-11 Topaze

=== Šlechta ===
(Jaroslav Šlechta)

- Šlechta Praha PB-3
- Šlechta Skaut 1930
- Šlechta Standart 1932
- Šlechta Skaut Standart 1936
- Šlechta Krakonoš 1922
- Šlechta Praha-II Delfín 1935

=== Slingsby ===
(Slingsby Sailplanes/Slingsby Aviation)

- Baynes Bat – experimental glider 1943
- Schreder HP-14
- Slingsby T.1 Falcon 1
- Slingsby T.2 Falcon 2
- Slingsby T.3 Dagling
- Slingsby T.4 Falcon 3
- Slingsby T.5 Grunau Baby
- Slingsby T.6 Kite
- Slingsby T.7 Kirby Cadet
- Slingsby T.8 Kirby Tutor
- Slingsby T.9 King Kite
- Slingsby T.12 Kirby Gull 1
- Slingsby T.13 Petrel
- Slingsby T.14 Kirby Gull 2
- Slingsby T.15 Kirby Gull 3
- Slingsby T.16
- Slingsby T.17
- Slingsby T.18 Hengist
- Slingsby T.19
- Slingsby T.20
- Slingsby T.21
- Slingsby T.22 Petrel 2
- Slingsby T.23 Kirby Kite 1A
- Slingsby T.23A
- Slingsby T.24 Falcon 4
- Slingsby T.25 Gull 4
- Slingsby T.26 Kite 2
- Slingsby T.27 Black Widow
- Slingsby T.28
- Slingsby T.29A/B Motor Tutor
- Slingsby T.30 Prefect
- Slingsby T.31 Tandem Tutor
- Slingsby T.32 Gull 4B
- Slingsby T.33
- Slingsby T.34 Sky
- Slingsby T.35 Austral
- Slingsby T.36
- Slingsby T.37 Skylark 1
- Slingsby T.38 Grasshopper
- Slingsby T.39 target to Spec. WT1/RDL.3
- Slingsby T.41 Skylark 2
- Slingsby T.42 Eagle
- Slingsby T.43 Skylark 3
- Slingsby T.44 Stratoferic
- Slingsby T.45 Swallow
- Slingsby T.46
- Slingsby T.47
- Slingsby T.48
- Slingsby T.49 Capstan
- Slingsby T.50 Skylark 4
- Slingsby T.51 Dart
- Slingsby T.52
- Slingsby T.53 Phoenix
- Slingsby T.54
- Slingsby T.55 Regal Eagle
- Slingsby T.59 Kestrel
- Slingsby T.61 Falke
- Slingsby T.65 Vega

=== Skurauskas-Mikevicius ===
(Skurauskas & Mikevicius)

- Skurauskas & Mikevicius Gandras (based on German glider)

=== Soko ===
(Sour Vazduhoplovna Industrija Soko, Radna Organizacija Vazduhoplovstvo Mostar)

- Soko SL-40 Liska

=== Solar Flight ===
(Solar Flight/Eric Scott Raymond)

- Sunseeker I
- Sunseeker II
- Sunseeker Duo

=== Šoštarić ===
(Ivo Šoštarić / SVC / UTVA, Pančevo (Slovénie))

- Šoštarić-Humek S.H.1 Sroka
- Šoštarić-Humek Metla
- Šoštarić-Humek Svraka
- Šoštarić Assault Glider
- Šoštarić Čavka
- Šoštarić Jastreb
- Šoštarić Roda
- Šoštarić Sokól
- Šoštarić Vrabac
- Šoštarić Štorklja (Roda - two-seat primary)

=== Souczek-Rainer ===
(Prof. Ernst Souczek with Franz Rainer / Austrian Acro Club Central Plant Facility & ObWm Kasper, Wien)

- Souczek Bussard II

=== Southdown ===
(Southdown Aero Services)

- Southdown Aero Services Colditz Cock replica

=== Southdown Skysailing Club ===
(Southdown Skysailing Club / Leeroy Brown)

- Southdown Skysailer (Brown 1931 glider)

=== SpaceShipOne ===
- SpaceShipOne Rocketplane

=== SpaceShipTwo ===
- SpaceShipTwo VSS Enterprise
- SpaceShipTwo VSS Unity

=== Spalinger ===
(Jakob Spalinger)

- Spalinger Austria I
- Spalinger Kranich
- Spalinger S.01
- Spalinger S.05
- Spalinger S.08
- Spalinger S.09
- Spalinger S.10 Zürivogel
- Spalinger S.11
- Spalinger S.12
- Spalinger S.14
- Spalinger S.15
- Spalinger S.15 Spez.
- Spalinger S.15a Austria II
- Spalinger S.15b
- Spalinger S.15c Milan
- Spalinger S.15K
- Spalinger S.16
- Spalinger S.16 II
- Spalinger S.16K
- Spalinger S.17
- Spalinger S.18
- Spalinger S.19
- Spalinger S-19m
- Spalinger S.20
- Spalinger S.21
- Spalinger S.22
- Spalinger S.23 Avional
- Spalinger S.24
- Spalinger S.25
- Spalinger S.27
- Spalinger S.28
- Lost (glider) (Jakob Spalinger, Fritz Stamer, Alexander Martin Lippisch & Hessel)

=== Spengler ===
(Hans Spengler)

- Spengler HS3 Skikarus

=== Špitálský ===
(Jaroslav Špitálský)

- Špitálský ŠPŠ-1 Bábinka
- Špitálský ŠP-2 Kamarád
- Špitálský ŠP-2A Fortuna

=== Spivak-Kolesnikov ===
(D. N. Kolesnikov & Spivak)

- Spivak-Kolesnikov Vega-1
- Spivak-Kolesnikov Vega-2

=== Sportárutermelõ Vállalat ===
(Hungary)

- Sportárutermelõ Vállalat C-2 Cinke – modified DFS Meise

=== Sportinė Aviacija (LAK) ===
See: LAK

=== Sports Aériens ===
- Sports Aériens SA-103 prone pilot
- Sports aériens SA-103 Émouchet
- Sports Aériens SA-104 Émouchet
- Sports Aériens SA-104 Émouchet Escopette
- Sports Aériens SA-110 Eider

=== Spratt ===
(George A. Spratt)

- Spratt 1909 glider
- Spratt 1929 glider

=== Sproule-Ivanoff ===
(J. S. Sproule, & A. Ivanoff / Scott Light Aircraft Ltd)

- Sproule-Ivanoff Camel

=== St. Louis ===
- St Louis CG-5
- St Louis CG-6
- St Louis SL-5

=== Stähls ===
(Bodo Stähls)

- Stähls Lo 170

=== Stanięda ===
(Emanuel Stanięda)

- Stanięda 1
- Stanięda 2
- Stanięda 3

=== Stanisavljevic ===
- Glisa Stanisavljevic GS-1

=== Stanko ===
(Obad Stanko)

- Stanko Musa SO-2

=== Stanley ===
(Robert M. Stanley)

- Stanley Nomad

=== Stark ===
(André Starck)

- Stark AS-07 Stabiplan

=== Starr ===
(Sterling Starr)

- Starr 1-23HM

=== Start + Flug ===
- Hänle H-101 Salto
- Hänle H-111 Hippie
- Hänle H-121 Globetrotter

=== Stedman ===
(R. F. Stedman R. F. / Bradford & County Gliding Club)

- Stedman TS-1 City of Leeds

=== Steinleher-Huber ===
(Fritz Steinleher sen. & Peter Huber)

- Steinleher-Huber SH-2H

=== Steinruck ===
(Wade Steinruck)

- Steinruck SCS-1

=== Stemme ===
(Stemme GmbH & Co KG)

- Stemme S2 – unpowered glider, 2 seater
- Stemme S6 – touring motorglider
- Stemme S7 – unpowered glider, 2 seater
- Stemme S8 – touring motorglider
- Stemme S10 – Self Launching motorglider and original aircraft
- Stemme S12
- Stemme S15 – Prototype UAV based on S6
- Stemme TG-11A
- Stemme ASP S15

=== Sterz ===
- Sterz P-77 – motorglider regn D-KHOP

=== Stevens ===
(Stevens Institute of Technology / Roswell Earl Franklin)

- Stevens SU-1
- Stevens-Franklin

=== Stoerl ===
(W. Stoerl)

- Stoerl 1911 glider

=== Stralpes Aéro ===
(Stralpes Aéro SARL)

- Stralpes Aéro ST-11
- Stralpes Aéro ST-15

=== Stratos ===
(Stratos Unternehmungsberatung GmbH)

- Stratos 500

=== Strauber-Frommhold ===
(Strauber-Frommhold GmbH)

- Strauber-Frommhold Mistral

=== Streifeneder ===
(Hansjörg Streifeneder)

- Streifeneder Albatros
- Streifeneder Eta
- Streifeneder-Hansen Falcon

=== Strojnik ===
(Professor Alex Strojnik)

- Strojnik S-2
- Strojnik S-2A
- Strojnik S-4 Laminar Magic
- Strojnik S-5

=== Štros ===
(Vladimir Štros)

- Štros K-2 Sova
- Štros K-3 Sokol

=== Studer-Sägesser ===
(Walter Studer & Rudolf Sägesser)

- Studer SH-1
- Studer WS-1 Habicht – Walter Studer
- Studer-Sägesser WS-1 Lilli – Walter Studer & Rudolf Sägesser

=== Stupnicki ===
(Jacek Stupnicki)

- Stupnicki AV-51
- Stupnicki AV-5l (alternative erroneous designation ?)

=== Stuttgart ===
(P. Brenner & M. Schrenk / Flugtechnische Verein Stuttgart)

- Stuttgart I
- Stuttgart II

=== Suchý ===
(Jindřich & Karel Suchý)

- Suchý BS-1
- Suchý BS-2 Olešná

=== Sukhanov ===
(Mignon V. Sukhanov / Sukhanova Novossibirsk)

- Sukhanov Diskoplan 1
- Sukhanov Diskoplan 2
- Sukhanov Diskoplan 3
- Sukhanov Diskoplan 4
- Sukhanov X-tail (Soviet spacecraft crew escape pod?)

=== Sunderland ===
(Gary Sunderland)

- Sunderland MOBA 2
- Sunderland MOBA 3 Virago

=== Suranyi-Hegedús ===
- Suranyi-Hegedús I

=== Svachulay ===
(Sándor Svachulay)

- Svachulay Albatross
- Svachulay Szent György I
- Svachulay Szent György II

=== SVC ===
(Savezni Vazduhoplovni Centar)

- SVC Cavka
- SVC Mačka
- SVC Vrabac A

=== Swales ===
(Swales Developments)

- Swales SD3-15

=== Swaty ===
(Franz Swaty)

- Swaty Kandidat

=== Swift ===
(Swift Ltd.)

- Swift S-1

=== Sydney University Gliding Club ===
- SUT-1 – (Sydney University Trainer 1)
- SUT-2 – (Sydney University Trainer 2)

=== Szokolay-Jancso ===
(András Szokolay & Endre Jancso / MSrE; Aero Ever Ltd., Aircraft Factory of Transylvania; different workshops of Aero Clubs)

- Szokolay-Jancso M-22

=== Szybowcowy Zakład Doświadczalny ===
- SZD-C Żuraw Crane
- SZD-6x Nietoperz (Bat)
- SZD-7 Osa (Wasp)
- SZD-8 Jaskółka (Swallow)
- SZD-9 Bocian (Stork)
- SZD-10 Czapla (Heron)
- SZD-11 Albatros (Albatross)
- SZD-12 Mucha 100 (Fly 100)
- SZD-13 Wampir (Vampire)
- SZD-14x Jaskółka M (Swallow M)
- SZD-15 Sroka (Magpie)
- SZD-16 Gil (Bullfinch)
- SZD-17x Jaskółka L (Swallow L)
- SZD-18 Czajka (Lapwing)
- SZD-19 Zefir (Zephyr)
- SZD-20x Wampir 2 (Vampire)
- SZD-21 Kobuz (Lerche Falcon)
- SZD-22 Mucha Standard (Fly Standard)
- SZD-23 Bocian 2 (Stork 2)
- SZD-24 Foka (Seal)
- SZD-25 Nov
- SZD-25A Lis (Fox)
- SZD-26 Wilk (Wolf)
- SZD-27 Kormoran (Cormorant)
- SZD-28 Latające laboratorium / Kondor (Flying Laboratory / Condor)
- SZD-29 Zefir 3 (Zephyr 3)
- SZD-30 Pirat (Pirate)
- SZD-31 Zefir 4 (Zephyr 4)
- SZD-32A Foka 5 (Seal 5)
- SZD-33 Bocian 3 (Stork)
- SZD-34 Bocian 3 (Ver. 2) (Stork 3 ver.2)
- SZD-35 Bekas (Snipe)
- SZD-36 Cobra 15 (Cobra)
- SZD-37x Jantar (Amber)
- SZD-38 Jantar 1 (Amber)
- SZD-39 Cobra 17 (Cobra 17)
- SZD-40x Halny (Föhn)
- SZD-41 Jantar Standard (Amber Standard)
- SZD-42 Jantar 2 (Amber 2)
- SZD-43 Orion
- SZD-45 Ogar (Bloodhound)
- SZD-48 Jantar Standard 2 (Amber Standard 2 and 3)
- SZD-49 Jantar K (Amber K)
- SZD-50 Puchacz (Eagle owl)
- SZD-51 Junior

=== Szynkiewicz ===
(Roman Szynkiewicz)

- Roman Szynkiewicz's Glider
