= 18S =

18S may refer to:

- 18S ribosomal RNA
- 18S rRNA (adenine1779-N6/adenine1780-N6)-dimethyltransferase
- 18SEH

== See also ==
- S18 (disambiguation)
