= S24 =

S24 may refer to:

== Aviation ==
- Focke-Wulf S 24 Kiebitz, a German sport aircraft
- Sandusky County Regional Airport, in Ohio, United States
- Sikorsky S-24, a Russian biplane bomber
- Spalinger S.24, a prototype Swiss glider

== Rail and transit ==
- S24 (St. Gallen S-Bahn), an S-Bahn service operating over the Altstätten–Gais railway line, Switzerland
- S24 (ZVV), a line of the Zurich S-Bahn, Switzerland
- Hirafu Station, in Kutchan, Hokkaido, Hokkaido, Japan
- Minami-Tatsumi Station, in Osaka, Japan

== Other uses ==
- 40S ribosomal protein S24
- County Route S24 (California), United States
- INS Vela (S24), a submarine of the Indian Navy
- S24: Avoid contact with skin, a safety phrase
- S-24 rocket, a Soviet rocket
- USS S-24 (SS-129), a submarine of the United States Navy
- Samsung Galaxy S24, an Android smartphone series by Samsung Electronics
