= T53 =

T53 may refer to:

== Aviation ==
- Cirrus T-53, an American trainer aircraft
- Hawker Hunter T.53, a British-built Danish trainer aircraft
- Lycoming T53, a turboshaft engine
- Slingsby T.53, a British glider

== Other uses ==
- T53 (classification), a disability sport classification
- Cooper T53, a British racing car
- Mosin–Nagant Type 53, a Chinese carbine
- T 53-class destroyer, of the French Navy
