= Bekas =

Bekas may refer to:

== People ==
- Muhammad Mohsin Bekas, 19th-century Sindhi Sufi poet and saint
- Sherko Bekas, Iraqi Kurdish poet

== Aircraft ==
- Kasper Bekas, American glider
- Lilienthal Bekas, ultralight aircraft
- SZD-35 Bekas, glider
- Beriev Be-103 Bekas, amphibious aircraft

== Others ==
- Bekas (film), a 2012 Kurdish film

== See also ==
- "Bekasi" or "Kabhi Bekasi Ne Maara", an Indian film song by R. D. Burman and Kishore Kumar from Alag Alag (1985), remade by Shashwat Sachdev for Dhurandhar: The Revenge (2026)
