= S15 =

S15 may refer to:

== Aircraft ==
- Sikorsky S-15, a prototype Russian biplane floatplane
- Spalinger S.15, a Swiss glider
- Stemme ASP S15, a German sailplane

== Automobiles ==
- GMC Jimmy (S-15), a SUV
- Laffly S15, a family of French all-terrain military vehicles
- Nissan Silvia (S15), a sports car

== Rail and transit ==
=== Lines ===
- S15 (ZVV), an S-Bahn line in Zurich, Switzerland
- S15, a line of St. Gallen S-Bahn operating over the Frauenfeld–Wil railway in Switzerland
- S15 (Berlin), planned line on S21 rail project

=== Locomotives ===
- LSWR S15 class, a British steam locomotive

=== Stations ===
- Hataki Station, in Ōzu, Ehime Prefecture, Japan
- Ikawadani Station, in Nishi-ku, Kobe, Hyōgo Prefecture, Japan
- Ojima Station, in Kōtō, Tokyo, Japan
- Otaru Station, in Otaru, Hokkaido, Japan
- Sakuragawa Station (Osaka), in Naniwa-ku, Osaka, Japan
- Sakura-hommachi Station, in Minami-ku, Nagoya, Aichi, Japan

== Science ==
- 40S ribosomal protein S15
- British NVC community S15, a swamps and tall-herb fens community in the British National Vegetation Classification system
- Explorer 11, a NASA satellite
- Ribosomal S15 leader
- S15: Keep away from heat, a safety phrase

== Vessels ==
- Brazilian submarine Goias (S15)
- Brazilian submarine Riachuelo (S15)
- HMS Otter (S15), a submarine of the Royal Navy
- SMS S15 (1912), a torpedo boat of the Imperial German Navy
- USS S-15 (SS-120), a submarine of the United States Navy

== Other uses ==
- S15 (classification), a disability swimming classification
- County Route S15 (California)
