= Siegel MS 2 =

General information
- Type: Glider
- National origin: Poland
- Designer: Mieczysław Siegel
- Number built: 1

History
- First flight: 1924

The Siegel MS 2 was a Polish, amateur-built glider incorporating lessons learned from his first design. It first flew in 1924 but had only a brief career. In 1925 an improved variant, the MS 3, flew briefly.

== Design and development ==
Mieczysław Siegel, a schoolteacher from Skrzynice near Lublin, designed and built his first aircraft, the Siegel MS 1, in the school summer holidays of 1923. It was a simple, small and very light foot-launched glider. Over the next summer he built its improved successor, the MS 2. This retained the earlier glider's low cost paper and card covering over a simple wooden structure but was no longer foot launched, allowing a conventional cockpit. It also had a simpler wing and a more conventional, less vulnerable tail.

Like its predecessor, the MS 2 had its high wing on top of the fuselage. The rectangular plan wing was built around two spars, covered with wrapping paper stiffened with gelatin. The forward spar was braced with a strut to the lower fuselage and the rear one by wire, allowing lateral control by wing warping as used on the MS 1.

The cardboard covered fuselage had a rectangular section which tapered rearwards more strongly than that of the MS 1 and had an open cockpit overlooking the mid-wing. The MS 2's tail surfaces were all paper-covered, with a tailplane that was triangular as before but less broad in chord and mounted at mid-fuselage. It carried a one-piece, large area elevator. The fin was now conventionally on top of the fuselage, triangular in profile and with a rhomboidal rudder which gave the elevator clearance to move upwards.

The MS 3 was a final development. It was broadly similar to the MS 2 but the wing strut was replaced by wire and the paper and card covering by fabric. There was no fin and it had new, cross-axle, wheeled landing gear.

== Operational history ==
Both the MS 2 and MS 3 had short lives. At the first attempts to rope-launch the former, the wind dropped and it would not take-off with a pilot aboard. To please the crowd Siegel flew it empty, as a kite. It performed well several times, then destabilized and crashed to destruction.

The MS 3's new landing gear proved a handicap, tending to sink into soft ground and making rope launches more difficult. Short hops were made with rope launches though it is not known if the rope was cleared. After its flying life ended in a crash it was repaired, then exhibited at an aeronautics show at Lublin.

== Variants ==
MS 2
1924 revision of MS 1. Slightly larger all round, new wing with rigid forward braces; new empennage. Rope launched so conventional cockpit.
MS 3
1925 revision of MS 2. Few details available, but with new undercarriage and fabric covered, all-wire wing bracing and finless.

== Specifications (MS 2) ==
Data from Samolotypolskie.pl

General characteristics

- Crew: One
- Length: 4.5 m (14 ft 9 in)
- Wingspan: 7 m (23 ft 0 in)
- Height: 0.85 m (2 ft 9 in)
- Wing area: 8.2 m^{2} (88 sq ft)
- Aspect ratio: 5
- Empty weight: 35 kg (77 lb)
- Gross weight: 110 kg (243 lb)
