= SZD-27 =

Polish two-seat glider, 1965

SZD-27 Kormoran
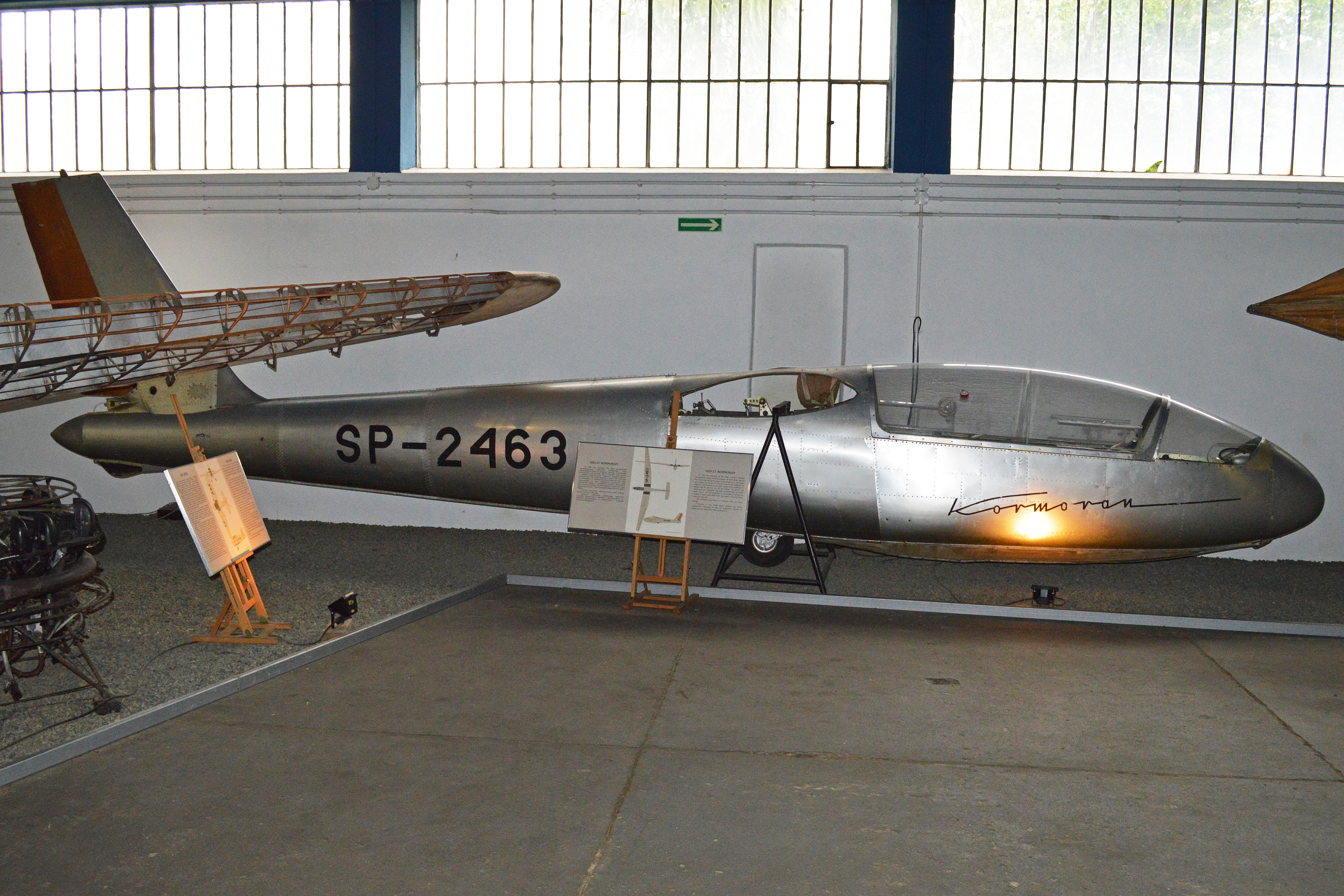

General information
- Type: Glider
- National origin: Poland
- Designer: Eng. Józef Niespał
- Number built: 2

History
- First flight: 2 January 1965

The SZD-27 Kormoran (Cormorant) (Szybowcowy Zakład Doświadczalny - Glider experimental department) was a two-seat glider designed in Poland from 1961.

== Development ==
The SZD-27 Kormoran was designed to cater for the large demand from Polish aeroclubs for two-seat training machines, for basic training, advanced training and aerobatics. The SZD-27 was the first and only glider designed by SZD to be built entirely of metal, with light alloy skins, formers, ribs, frames etc., with steel high strength detail parts. The undercarriage comprises a semi-recessed mainwheel with skids under the nose and at the tail. Only two were built which both survive, one in the Kraków museum store-house and one restored to airworthiness in the 1990s by a private owner. The SZD-27 Kormoran resembles a cross between a LET L-13 Blaník and an SZD-24 Foka.

== Specifications (SZD-27 Kormoran) ==
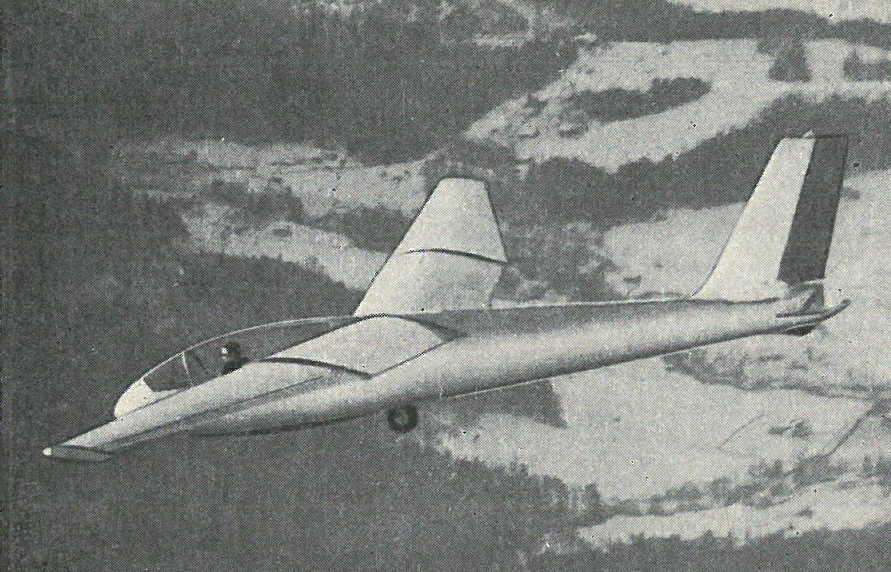
SZD-27 Kormoran

Data from

General characteristics

- Crew: 2
- Length: 8 m (26 ft 3 in)
- Wingspan: 17 m (55 ft 9 in)
- Height: 1.1 m (3 ft 7 in)
- Wing area: 19.3 m^{2} (208 sq ft)
- Aspect ratio: 15
- Empty weight: 289 kg (637 lb)
- Max takeoff weight: 517 kg (1,140 lb)

Performance

- Stall speed: 64 km/h (40 mph, 35 kn)
- Never exceed speed: 235 km/h (146 mph, 127 kn)
- Maximum glide ratio: 28.1 at 93 km/h (58 mph; 50 kn)
- Rate of sink: 0.8 m/s (160 ft/min) at 80 km/h (50 mph; 43 kn)
- Lift-to-drag: +8 / -4 g
- Wing loading: 28.6 kg/m^{2} (5.9 lb/sq ft)

== See also ==
Aircraft of comparable role, configuration, and era

- Slingsby T.53 Phoenix
- LET L-13 Blaník
