= S18 =

S18 may refer to:

== Aviation ==
- Forks Airport, in Clallam County, Washington, United States
- Letov Š-18, a Czechoslovak biplane trainer
- Rans S-18 Stinger II, an American ultralight
- Saab 18, a Swedish bomber and reconnaissance aircraft
- Sikorsky S-18, a Russian biplane
- Spalinger S.18, a Swiss sailplane
- Thorp S-18, an American homebuilt aircraft

== Rail and transit ==
- Forch railway, a line of the Zürich S-Bahn
- Ichinoe Station, in Edogawa, Tokyo, Japan
- Iyo-Ōzu Station, in Ōzu, Ehime Prefecture, Japan
- Naruko Kita Station, in Tempaku-ku, Nagoya, Aichi Prefecture, Japan
- Tanimachi Kyūchōme Station, in Ikutamamaemachi, Tennōji-ku, Osaka, Japan
- Yoichi Station, in Yoichi, Hokkaido, Japan

== Vessels ==
- HMS Otus (S18), a submarine of the Royal Navy
- SMS S18 (1912), a torpedo boat of the Imperial German Navy
- USS S-18 (SS-123), a submarine of the United States Navy

== Other uses ==
- 40S ribosomal protein S18
- County Route S18 (California), United States
- Riich M1, a subcompact car also marketed as Chery S18
- S18: Handle and open container with care, a safety phrase
- S-18 85 mm gun, a Soviet tank gun
- S18, a postcode district in Dronfield, England
