= Schultz Nucleon =

American glider

Nucleon

General information
- Type: Glider
- National origin: United States
- Designer: Arthur B. Schultz
- Status: No longer in production
- Number built: One

History
- Introduction date: 1954

The Schultz Nucleon is an American high-wing strut-braced, single-seat glider that was designed and constructed by Arthur B. Schultz.

== Design and development ==
The Nucleon was built by Schultz in 1954 and even though the wing was strut-braced the aircraft introduced some innovative construction techniques. The wing was carved from Styrofoam around its spar and then covered in fiberglass for a skin. The wing uses a NACA 65-415 airfoil, has full-span flaps and drooping ailerons, and is braced with a single faired strut. The strut-braced tailplane folds so that the aircraft can be loaded for ground transportation on a trailer.

Only one Nucleon was built and it is registered in the Experimental - amateur-built category.

== Operational history ==
The aircraft was flown in the 1956 US Nationals and completed several 200 mi (322 km) cross country flights.

In June 2011, 57 years after the aircraft was built, it was still on the US Federal Aviation Administration registry, listed as being subject to a sale.

== Specifications (Nucleon) ==
Data from Sailplane Directory and Soaring

General characteristics

- Crew: one
- Wingspan: 46 ft 0 in (14.02 m)
- Wing area: 131 sq ft (12.2 m^{2})
- Aspect ratio: 16:1
- Airfoil: NACA 65-415
- Gross weight: 535 lb (243 kg)

Performance

- Maximum glide ratio: 22:1 at 47 mph (76 km/h)
- Rate of sink: 198 ft/min (1.01 m/s) at 43 mph (69 km/h)
- Wing loading: 4.1 lb/sq ft (20 kg/m^{2})

== See also ==
Related lists

- List of gliders
