= Schneider ESG 31 Schlesierland =

German single-seat glider, 1929

ESG 31 Schlesierland

General information
- Type: Soaring glider
- National origin: Germany
- Manufacturer: Edmund Schneider, Grunau
- Number built: Not known

History
- First flight: 1929

The Schneider ESG 31 Schlesierland (Silesia) was a representative of a group of German, 16 m (52 ft 6 in) span, one-off gliders, built by Schneider in Grunau from 1929 to at least 1931.

== Design and development ==
In 1928 or 1929, Edmund Schneider wanted a glider that could compete with the 1928 RRG Professor. It needed to be easy to build, safe to fly and capable of tow launching. The Professor had a span of 16.1 m (52 ft 10 in) and Schneider's ESG 31, as it is often known, was only just smaller at 16.0 m (52 ft 6 in). The two types had much in common, though Schneider's design was original, with a different airfoil, struttage and a simplified structure. The name has sometimes led to confusion, for Schneider's notation, ESG+(last two year digits), meant that separate types that appeared in the same year would have the same designation; the 16 m ESG 31 and the smaller and very different, 12.8 m (42 ft 0 in) span ESG31 Baby were one such pair. There was also no EGS 31 production line; each example was custom built, incorporating improvements progressively. Each was known by a name given to it by its owner, often that of a sponsor using it as an advertisement. Neither the date nor name of the first example is known for sure, though the Wiesenberg seems to date from 1929 or 1930 (ESG 29 or 30). However, Schneider's catalogue of 1931 describes later developments like the ESG 31A and ESG 31B as improved EGS 31 Schlesierland single seater types. This is also the type name used by the Segelflyg Museum at Falköping which currently holds the only surviving example, the ESG 31 Läkerolplanet delivered in 1933.

The Schlesierland's wing is held above the fuselage on a pedestal and braced by a single lift strut on each side from the lower fuselage longeron to about one quarter chord. The wing is built around a single spar and plywood covered ahead of it around the leading edge, with fabric covering behind. The central third of the span is a rectangular panel, within which a diagonal sub spar runs rearwards from the main spar, with additional ply covering ahead of it. Originally there were no control surfaces on this inner panel, though in 1941 airbrakes were added across the junction between inner and outer panels, mounted behind the main spar. The outer panels taper strongly with sweep on both edges, ending in elliptical tips; the broad ailerons, which occupy about half the span and, at their inboard ends, about half the chord, are also tapered though less strongly than the wing.

All the Schlesierland variants had a ply covered fuselage; most were hexagonal in cross-section, though that of the 1931 ESG 31B had a rounded, streamlined form. Early Schlesierlands had open cockpits and landed on a skid that reached from the nose to the lift strut attachment point but the 1931 Stanavo introduced a monowheel aft of the skid. At some point it was fitted with a multi-transparency cockpit canopy. The wing pedestal slowly deceases in height rearwards above the fuselage, ending about halfway to the tail. The narrow, swept tailplane is mounted on top of the fuselage; on the later 1931 variants, the ESG 31A and B, the tailplane was braced to the top of the fin. On all models except possibly the Commodore, this was ply covered and only about a third the height of the balanced rudder. Both rudder and elevators are fabric covered with rounded trailing edges; the rudder extends down to the keel and operated between the elevators. There is a small, partly faired sprung tailskid immediately ahead of the rudder hinge line.

== Operational history ==
Two Weisebaudes were probably operated by the same club. The Frankenstein, which Hirth flew at the 1932 Rhön competition, was used by a police gliding club in Frankenstein, Silesia, now Ząbkowice Śląskie. The Stanavo was sponsored by the German division of Standard Oil, possibly for their European representative, Jack O'Meara. Läkerolplanet operated in Sweden for many years from 1933. On 12 August 1933, piloted by Edmund Sparmann, it made the first glider crossing of the Öresund whilst flying the 25 km (16 mi) between Copenhagen and Malmö. The flight was sponsored by the firm Läkerol. It belonged to S F K Chalmers and Gothenburg Aero Club.

== Variants ==
Wiesenbaude
Two early examples, probably from 1929 and designated ESG 29 or ESG 30.
ESG 31 Schlesierland
As Weisenbaude. The next ESG 31, the Stanavo, had a landing wheel. Its cockpit, initially open, was later enclosed.
ESG 31A
Revised tail with braced tailplane.
ESG 31B
As ESG 31A but with a new, streamlined fuselage.
Commodore
Same span, wing plan and airfoil section but new, straight edged tail unit adding 400 mm (15.7 in) to length.

== Aircraft on display ==
- Ållebergs Segelflyg Museet, Falköping: ESG 31A Läkerolplanet, the only survivor.

== Specifications (ESG 31A) ==
Data from Sailplanes 1920-1945 (2006) p. 86

General characteristics

- Crew: One
- Length: 6.60 m (21 ft 8 in)
- Wingspan: 16.00 m (52 ft 6 in)
- Wing area: 16.3 m^{2} (175 sq ft)
- Aspect ratio: 15.5
- Airfoil: Göttingen 535
- Empty weight: 150 kg (331 lb)
- Gross weight: 240 kg (529 lb)
- Wing loading: 13.5 kg/m^{2} (2.8 lb/sqft)

Performance

- Maximum glide ratio: 23:1 at 60 km/h (37 mph; 32 kn)

== See also ==
Related lists

- List of gliders
