= 18S rRNA (adenine1779-N6/adenine1780-N6)-dimethyltransferase =

Class of enzymes

18S rRNA (adenine^{1779}-N^{6}/adenine^{1780}-N^{6})-dimethyltransferase

Identifiers
- EC no.: 2.1.1.183

Databases
- IntEnz: IntEnz view
- BRENDA: BRENDA entry
- ExPASy: NiceZyme view
- KEGG: KEGG entry
- MetaCyc: metabolic pathway
- PRIAM: profile
- PDB structures: RCSB PDB PDBe PDBsum
Search
- PMC: articles
- PubMed: articles
- NCBI: proteins

18S rRNA (adenine^{1779}-N^{6}/adenine^{1780}-N^{6})-dimethyltransferase (EC 2.1.1.183, 18S rRNA dimethylase Dim1p, Dim1p, ScDim1, m2(6)A dimethylase, KIDIM1) is an enzyme with systematic name S-adenosyl-L-methionine:18S rRNA (adenine^{1779}-N^{6}/adenine^{1780}-N6)-dimethyltransferase. This enzyme catalyses the following chemical reaction

4 S-adenosyl-L-methionine + adenine^{1779}/adenine^{1780} in 18S rRNA $\rightleftharpoons$ 4 S-adenosyl-L-homocysteine + N^{6}-dimethyladenine^{1779}/N^{6}-dimethyladenine^{1780} in 18S rRNA

DIM1 is involved in pre-rRNA processing.
