= Streifeneder Albatros =

German single-seat glider, 2001

Albatros

General information
- Type: Glider
- National origin: Germany
- Manufacturer: Glasfaser Flugzeug-Service GmbH
- Designer: Hansjörg Streifeneder

History
- Introduction date: April 2001

The Streifeneder Albatros (English: Albatross) is a German mid-wing, gull wing, T-tailed, single-seat, FAI Standard Class glider that was designed by Hansjörg Streifeneder and produced by his company Glasfaser Flugzeug-Service GmbH.

The aircraft was first exhibited at the Aero show in Friedrichshafen, Germany, in April 2001.

== Design and development ==
The Albatros was intended to take advantage of a number of aerodynamic refinements to achieve a higher performance than other standard class gliders. These include a new type of fuselage wing fillet that creates laminar flow in the junction, upper and lower surface wing and aileron boundary layer blowing and an airfoil designed by Professor Loek M. M. Boermans of the Delft University of Technology. The aileron blowing varies with airspeed. The company claims that this creates 95% laminar flow on the wing underside and produces 10% less profile drag than the Schleicher ASW 24.

The aircraft is made from carbon-fiber-reinforced polymer, fibreglass and Kevlar. Its gulled 15 m (49.2 ft) wing employs winglets and uses triple-panel upper surface airbrakes for glidepath control. The high-mounted tailplane has electric trim and a ballistic parachute is fitted. 115 kg (254 lb) of water ballast is carried. The landing gear is a suspended and electrically retractable monowheel.

== Specifications (Albatros) ==
Data from Sailplane Directory

General characteristics

- Crew: one
- Wingspan: 15.00 m (49 ft 3 in)
- Wing area: 9.04 m^{2} (97.3 sq ft)
- Aspect ratio: 25.89
- Empty weight: 220 kg (485 lb)
- Gross weight: 450 kg (992 lb) including 115 kg (254 lb) of water ballast

Performance

- Wing loading: 50 kg/m^{2} (10 lb/sq ft)

== See also ==
Related lists

- List of gliders
