= Guerchais-Roche Émouchet =

Single-seat French glider, 1942

Émouchet
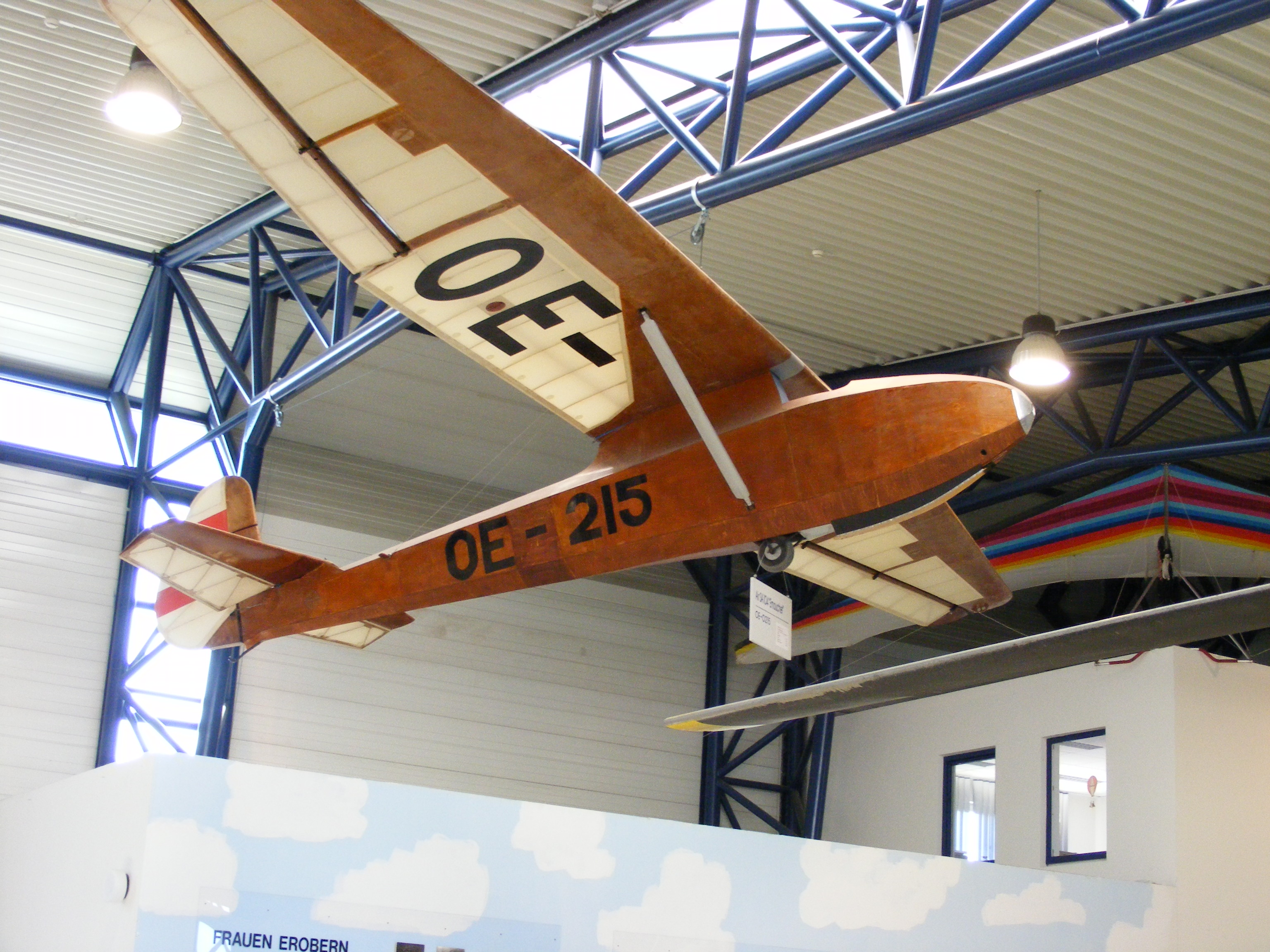
- SA-104 Émouchet

General information
- Type: Basic single-seat trainer glider
- National origin: France
- Manufacturer: Arsenal
- Number built: at least 450

History
- First flight: c. 1942

The Arsenal Émouchet (English: Kestrel), more commonly known as Sports Aériens Émouchet, Air Émouchet, or Guerchais-Roche Émouchet, is a modest performance, single-seat training glider designed and first produced in France during World War II. Quantity production continued post-war, when it played an important part in re-equipping the French glider movement through its clubs.

== Design and development ==
The Émouchet was designed and built by Arsenal de l'Aeronautique during World War II. It is an all wood and fabric, single seat, open cockpit training and club glider influenced, like many others, by the Grunau Baby but distinct from it. The single spar wings, wooden structures with fabric covering, have a parallel chord centre section and tapered outer panels with rounded tips. The trailing edges of these outer panels are occupied with ailerons. There are no flaps or spoilers on the initial SA 103 model, but the later Arsenal SA 104 has mid-chord spoilers at the outer end of the centre section.

As on the Grunau Baby, the wing is high or parasol mounted, raised above the fuselage on a pedestal which rapidly drops away behind the trailing edge. It is braced to the lower fuselage with a short single steel strut on each side. The Émouchet's open cockpit is at the front of the pedestal, just ahead of the wing leading edge. Its hexagonal cross section fuselage is entirely plywood covered. The fabric covered rear surfaces are markedly different from those of the Baby, with the horizontal stabiliser raised above the fuselage on a shallow step well forward of the narrow fin and with control surfaces which are rounded; the rudder in particular is curved and broad. The SA 103 lands on a single forward skid and tail bumper but a monowheel was added to the SA 104.

== Operational history ==
The SA 103 Émouchet was selected for quantity production under the Vichy government, with about 200 built. Post war, the French government included it in a list of four production glider types as the basic single-seat trainer, flown after introductionary tuition in the two seat Caudron C.800. Ateliers Roche Aviation (Guerchais-Roche) built 150 SA 103 and 100 SA 104. Ets Victor Minie were another company which built Émouchets, producing 27 SA 104s. They were also involved in a collaboration with SNECMA which involved fitting four of the latter's Escopette 3340 pulse jets under the wings of an Émouchet in pairs of long housings mounted well clear under each wing on a pair of thin struts. Each engine produced a thrust of 98 N (22 lb) for a weight of 4.5 kg (9.9 lb). This aircraft flew for the first time on 30 November 1950. By the following June a second aircraft was flying with six of these engines. Later, the more powerful Tremblon pulse-jet was fitted.

Three remained on the French civil register in 2010.

== Variants ==
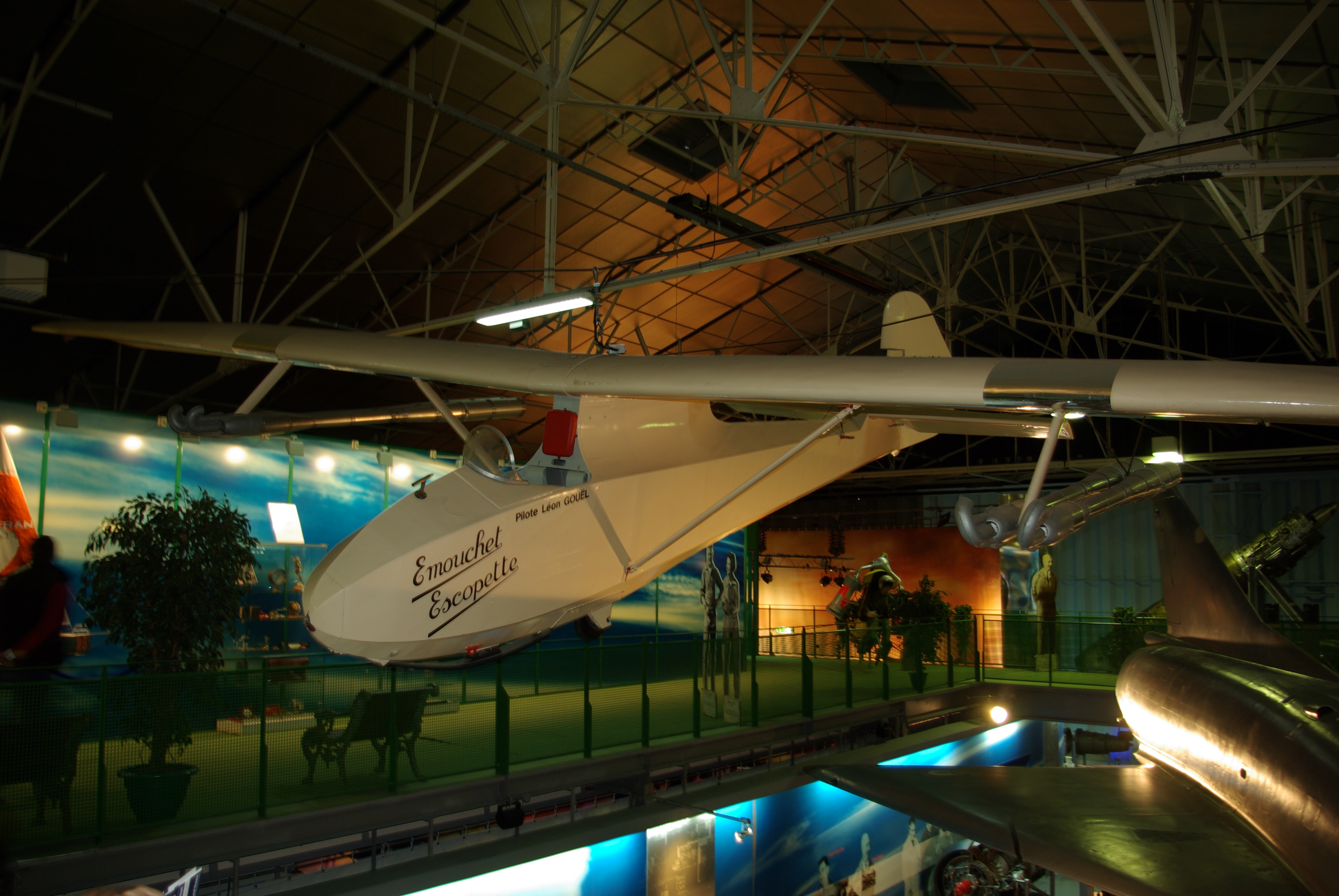
Émouchet Escopette in the Aeronautics and Space Museum Safran

SA 103
Original design, first flown and produced during World War II, production continued post-war. At least 350 built.

SA 104
First flown around 1950; it is heavier with spoilers and a monowheel undercarriage. At least150 built.

Minié Emouchet Escopette
One off modification by Société Minié Aéronautiques with initially four, later six, underwing SNECMA Escopette pulse-jets, later replaced with Tremblon pulse-jets. First flown 30 November 1950.

SA 103 prone pilot
An SA 103 was modified with a prone pilot position for research purposes.

== Specifications (SA 104) ==
Data from The World's Sailplanes

General characteristics

- Crew: One
- Length: 6.74 m (22 ft 1 in)
- Wingspan: 12.48 m (40 ft 11 in)
- Height: 2.00 m (6 ft 7 in)
- Wing area: 16.50 m^{2} (177.6 sq ft)
- Aspect ratio: 9.4
- Empty weight: 176 kg (388 lb)
- Gross weight: 271 kg (597 lb)

Performance

- Never exceed speed: 160 km/h (99 mph, 86 kn) placard, smooth air
- Rough air speed max: 90 km/h (56 mph; 49 kn)
- Aerotow speed: 90 km/h (56 mph; 49 kn)
- Rate of sink: 0.84 m/s (165 ft/min) minimum at 57 km/h (35 mph; 31 kn)
- Lift-to-drag: maximum, c.20:1
- Wing loading: 16.4 kg/m^{2} (3.4 lb/sq ft)

== See also ==
Aircraft of comparable role, configuration, and era

- Schneider Grunau Baby

Related lists

- List of gliders
