= Sunderland MOBA 2 =

MOBA 2

General information
- Type: Single seat sailplane
- National origin: Australia
- Designer: Gary Sunderland
- Number built: 1

History
- First flight: early 1980

The Sunderland MOBA 2 was a single seat glider built in Australia in the 1970s. It was constructed from a mixture of metal, wood and synthetic material and had some unconventional features such as side-stick control, and a nosecone which rolled forward on rails for pilot access.

== Design and development ==
The Sunderland MOBA 2 was entirely one man's glider. In the 1970s Gary Sunderland was an Australian Department of Aviation engineer and a glider pilot who wished to compete in the Australian National Championships in his own design of glider, "my own bloody aircraft" or MOBA for short, in his phrase. It was intended as an aircraft of high, Standard class performance, but capable of low-cost, home assembly. By 1970 his efforts had converged onto the MOBA 2 and some outline drawings and trial metalwork produced. The single seat glider was to have a 15 m Standard class span wing but with a retractable undercarriage and flaps, not then allowable in that category.

Two versions, driven by a competition held by the Australian Gliding magazine, did not get off the drawing board: though accounts differ in detail, it seems the MOBA 2A had a 15 m span and the final competition entrant MOBA 2B a 13 m span as required. The MOBA 2B was one of two potential winners selected by the judges in 1972, but unfortunately they could not agree on a final choice and no prize was awarded. The MOBA 2C, the sole version to be built though later modified into the MOBA 2D, differed only from the MOBA 2B in having a 15 m span wing, taller fin and fabric covered rudder.

The MOBA 2C was of mixed construction. Its wing was in three sections, with a centre-section of constant chord mounted high on the fuselage; and straight tapered outer panels. It was built around a single metal, rectangular, PVC plastic foam filled box spar, with GRP/plywood sandwich ribs. The space between the ribs was also filled with PVC foam, which was then shaped to the Wortmann FX 67-K-150 section and covered with glass cloth. The outer panels carried long span ailerons and the inner sections full span, metal skinned flaps, which could be set at angles between +20° and -15°. They were lowered for landing, increasing lift coefficient at lower speed and acting as airbrakes. Aerodynamically, the wing was designed to operate at speed, a natural choice for soaring in Australia with its strong thermals and long inter-thermal distances.

The MOBA 2C had a pod-and-boom type fuselage. The pilot's seat was just forward of the wing leading edge, placing him in a reclining position under a long, single piece canopy, shaped from an uncut Slingsby Kestrel moulding. The cockpit had some unusual features, principally that access to it was by rolling the whole nosecone and canopy forwards along a rail from a join around the fuselage ahead of the wing. This provided an aerodynamically very clean and well sealed forward fuselage, as well as easy access for instrument panel servicing. The control column was side mounted on a raised side beam on the right; flap and undercarriage levers were similarly mounted on the other side. This arrangement avoided underfloor control cables, keeping the fuselage cross section low and simplifying the control linkages. The cockpit was narrow and low and would not have been comfortable for pilots taller than Sunderland. The nosecone was skinned with glass cloth over balsa. Instrument panel, controls, seat and the retractable monowheel undercarriage were supported by a central, sturdy, sheet alloy frame linked to the wing. The fuselage tapered from the leading edge aft, an area covered with glass cloth over PVC foam. Behind this, the boom was an oval metal tube, with flat top and bottom plates for ease of construction. Tail surfaces were all straight edged; the tall, metal-skinned fin had a slightly swept GRP leading edge and carried a tapered, fabric covered rudder. The MOBA 2C had a T-tail, with a metal surfaced, high aspect ratio, tapered tailplane and a plywood-surfaced elevator. There was a small, semi-recessed tailwheel below the fin.

Though Sunderland had hoped to have the MOBA 2C ready for the World Gliding Championships held in Australia in 1974, particularly after changes to Standard Class rules allowed retractable undercarriages and flaps, he was unable to complete flight testing before 1980. It handled well and performed as expected, competitive with Open Class whilst climbing in thermals but slower across country. Landing behaviour led to the addition of spoilers halfway out along the central panels; and tapered rather than parallel chord flaps, which added 51 mm (2.0 in) to the overall chord at the wing root, slightly increasing the wing area. This revision was named the MOBA 2D.

== Operational history ==
The MOBA 2C had its first competitive outing at the 1980 Australian Championships at Benalla. Sunderland judged its performance as between the 15 m class and the Standard Class gliders there, perhaps rather closer to the latter. He could out-turn the 15 m aircraft in thermals but they, 100 kg (220 lb) heavier flew faster at the same glide angle. He estimated that the MOBA 2C approximately achieved its 1:38 design glide angle.

As the MOBA 2D aged, the foam filling that determined its wing profile began to destabilise and expand. The outer glass fibre covering was removed, the profile restored and the aircraft was flown again after the wing was recovered, but further development was abandoned.

== Variants ==
MOBA 2A
Unbuilt 15 m span design.

MOBA 2B
Unbuilt 13 m span design submitted to Australian Glider competition.

MOBA 2C
Only completed version, with original flaps and no airbrakes.

MOBA 2D
MOBA 2C with modified flaps and equipped with airbrakes.

== Specifications (MOBA 2D) ==
Data from Sailplanes 1965-2005

General characteristics

- Crew: 1
- Length: 6.782 m (22 ft 3 in)
- Wingspan: 15.00 m (49 ft 3 in)
- Wing area: 9.24 m^{2} (99.5 sq ft)
- Aspect ratio: 24.3
- Airfoil: Wortmann FX 67-K-150
- Empty weight: 279 kg (615 lb)
- Gross weight: 370 kg (816 lb)

Performance

- Wing loading: 40.0 kg/m^{2} (8.2 lb/sq ft)
