= Siren Edelweiss =

French single seat glider, 1962

Edelweiss
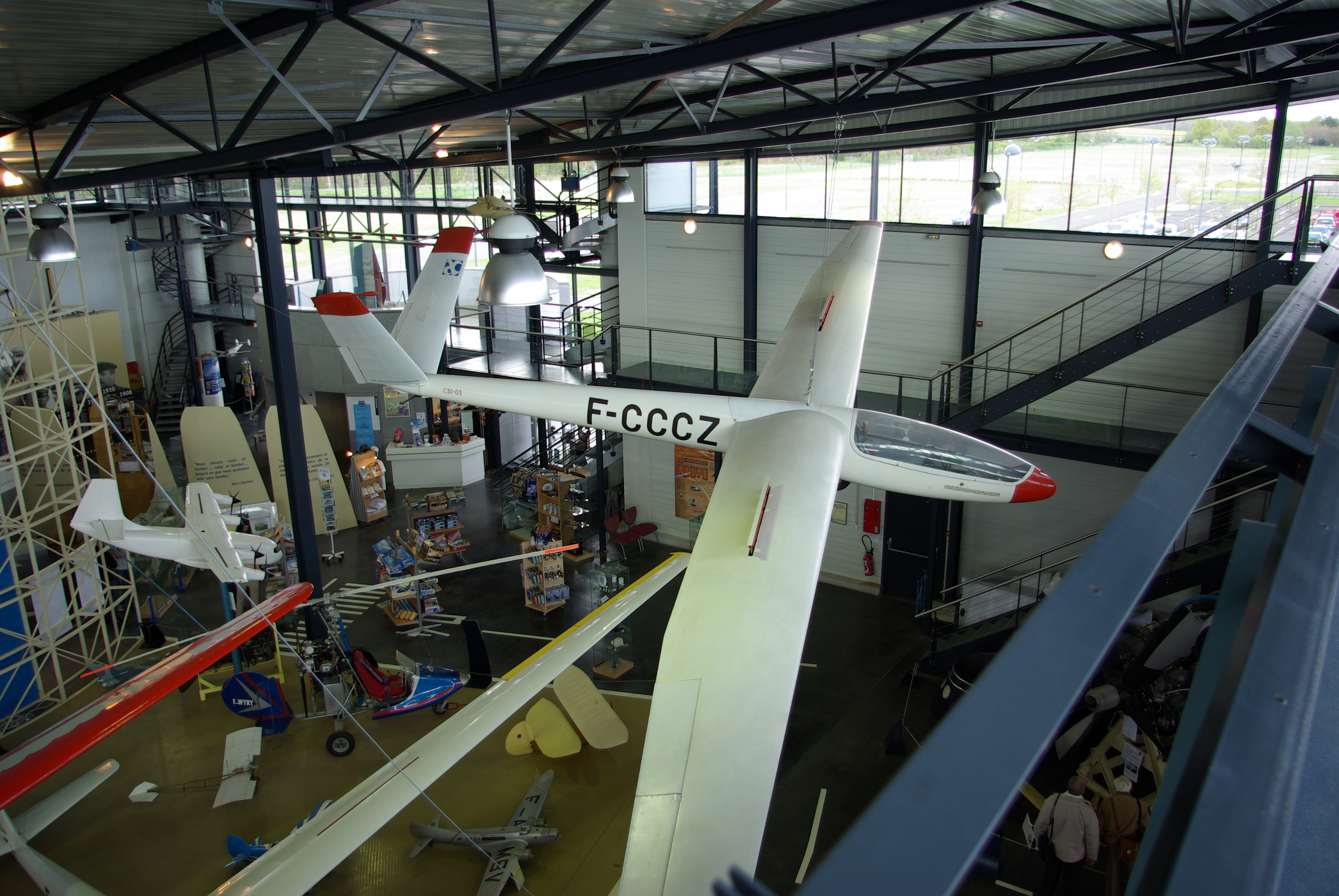
- Siren C.30S Edelweiss (F-CCCZ), at Musée régional de l'air d'Angers-Marcé

General information
- Type: Standard Class single seat competition sailplane
- National origin: France
- Manufacturer: Siren SA
- Designer: M. Laguette
- Number built: 52

History
- First flight: 25 September 1962

The Siren C.30 Edelweiss (or C.30S) is a 15 m span, Standard Class sailplane designed in France in the early 1960s. The Edelweiss came second in its class at the 1963 World Gliding Championships (WGC) and first in its class two years later. Several are still flying in France and elsewhere in 2010.

== Design and development ==
The Edelweiss is a 15 m class, single seat, shoulder wing sailplane with a butterfly tail, built mostly from wood. The wing has a single spar and is skinned with 8 mm foam-bonded plywood. It has almost constant chord; it had forward sweep on the two prototypes but production Edelweiss have unswept wings. The ailerons are metal and are shorter on production aircraft. Inboard airbrakes, again shorter in production aircraft, can extend from both upper and lower surfaces. The butterfly tail consists of two all moving surfaces, with wood sandwich leading edges and fabric covering elsewhere. Both carry trim tabs.

The slender fuselage is assembled from two formed, foam-bonded ply shells, each with inbuilt longerons. Nose and tail cones are of laminated plastic. The pilot sits in a semi-reclining position, under a long, starboard hinged, canopy which ends at the wing leading edge. The prototypes had longer noses than later aircraft. The Edelweiss lands on a fixed, sprung, monowheel undercarriage, fitted with a wheel brake operated jointly with the airbrakes.

The Edelweiss flew for the first time on 25 September 1962. An initial production batch of 15 was begun in January 1965.

== Operational history ==
The two Edelweiss prototypes competed in the 1963 WGC, held at Junin, Argentina and were placed 2nd and 17th in the Standard Class, piloted respectively by J. Lachney and C. Labar. At the next WGC, held in 1965 at South Cerney, UK, two production aircraft finished in 1st and 7th place in their class, piloted by François Louis Henry and J. Lachney; two others were placed 8th and 10th (pilots J.-P. Cartrey and J. Penaud) in the Open Class (unrestricted span).

51 Edelweiss have appeared on the French civil register. As of mid-2010, 12 Edelweiss remained on the French register and 1 on each on the registers of Belgium and Monaco; at least 3 are not active. Another is on the US register.

== Variants ==
- Siren-Bertin C.34 Edelweiss IV
  Open Class version with 17.50 m span and retractable wheel. Two built.

== Specifications (C.30S) ==
Data from Jane's All the World's Aircraft 1966/7

General characteristics

- Crew: 1
- Length: 7.39 m (24 ft 3 in)
- Wingspan: 15.00 m (49 ft 3 in)
- Wing area: 12.5 m^{2} (135 sq ft) gross
- Aspect ratio: 18
- Empty weight: 238 kg (525 lb)
- Max takeoff weight: 380 kg (838 lb)

Performance

- Maximum speed: 225 km/h (140 mph, 121 kn) in smooth air
- Stall speed: 65 km/h (40 mph, 35 kn) approximately
- Maximum glide ratio: 36:1 at 95 km/h (59 mph)
- Rate of sink: 0.65 m/s (128 ft/min) at 145 km/h (90 mph)
