= Stanisavljević =

Stanisavljević is a Serbian-language surname. Notable people with the name include:

- Aleksandar Stanisavljević (born 1989), Serbian football winger
- Aleksandar Stanisavljević (footballer, born 1998), Serbian football defender
- Danilo Stanisavljević (1917–1942), Croatian Serb revolutionary
- Dragiša Stanisavljević (1921–2012), Serbian sculptor
- Filip Stanisavljević (born 1987), Serbian football midfielder
- Goran Stanisavljević (born 1987), Serbian football midfielder
- Igor Stanisavljević (born 1978), Serbian football defender
- Jelena Stanisavljević (born 1978), Serbian sprinter
- Jovo Stanisavljević (1897–1925), Serbian outlaw
- Nina Stanisavljević (born 2004), Serbian swimmer
- Stefan Stanisavljević (born 2002), Serbian football centre-forward
