= Spalinger S.21 =

Swiss 1930s trainer glider

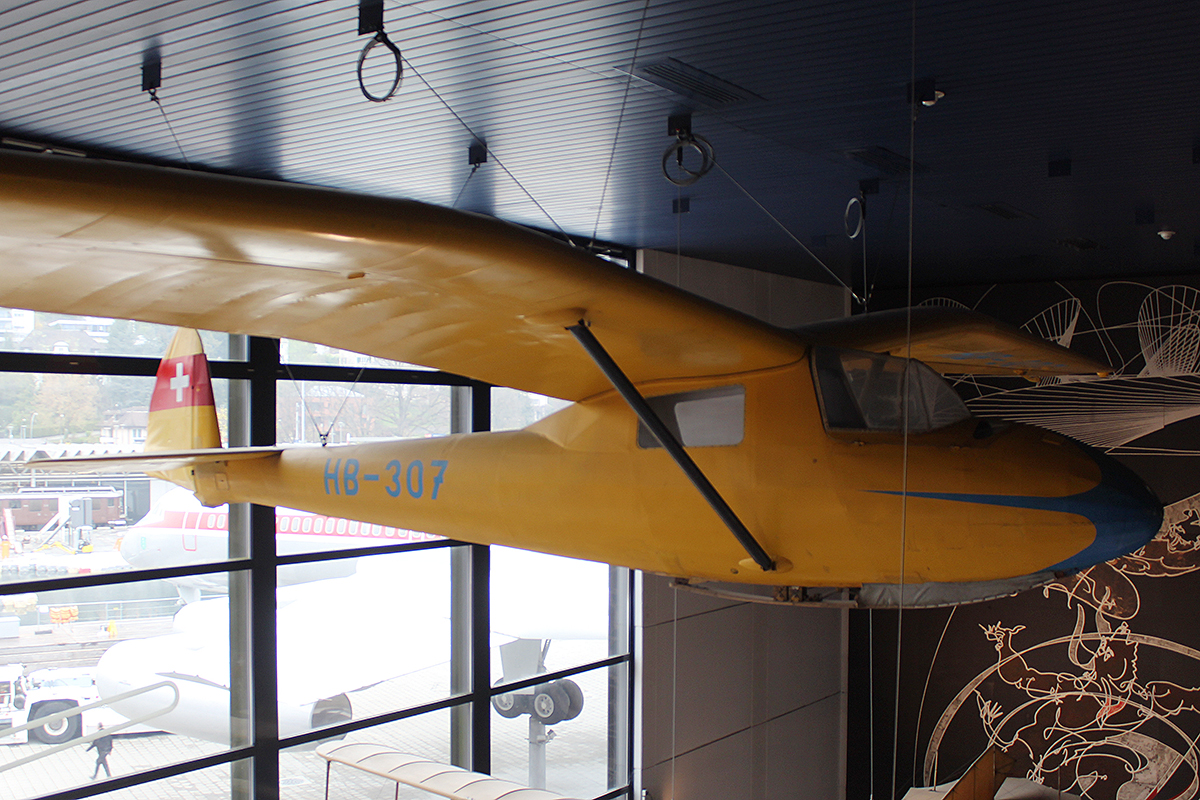
- S-21H in Verkehrshaus der Schweiz, Luzern

General information
- Type: Two-seat training glider.
- National origin: Switzerland
- Designer: Jacob Spalinger
- Number built: At least 15.

History
- First flight: 1937

The Spalinger S.21 is a Swiss two-seat trainer glider flown in the late 1930s. They were heavily used as trainers but also set many new Swiss national records in the two-seat category.

== Design and development ==
The 1938 Spalinger S.21 is one of a series of gull-winged gliders designed by Jakob Spalinger which began in 1934 with the S.15 and included the 1936 Spalinger S.18 which competed in that year's Berlin Olympic Games and dominated Swiss competitions and national records. The heavier, two-seat S.21 has a wing increased in span by 23% and externally braced in contrast to the S.18's cantilever wing.

The inner third of its wooden, single-spar wing is rectangular in plan and set with 5° of dihedral. Beyond, the wing is trapezoidal out to rounded tips and lacks dihedral. Each inner section is internally braced against drag loads with diagonal struts from the spars, meeting centrally, and against lift loads by an external single steel strut from the section's outer end to the fuselage keel. Each half-wing is plywood-covered ahead of the spars and around the leading edge, forming a torsion resistant D-box. Behind the spars the wings are fabric-covered and their outer sections have ailerons occupying most of their trailing edges. The first prototype initially lacked airbrakes but these were later mounted on the rear of the spar just outboard of the inner section.

Following the prototype there were three variants of the S.21, differing chiefly in their fuselage structures, but most S.21s were S-21Hs, otherwise known as S.21-Is. These had wood-framed fuselages, oval in section and plywood-skinned. The forward seat was ahead of the wing's leading edge, under a transparent, multipart canopy. The wing was raised above the main fuselage on a streamlined pedestal that enclosed the rear seat, with rectangular windows on each side. Access was via a port-side door. The fuselage tapered rearwards to a small fin that carried a large, curved balanced rudder with a rather pointed tip. Its nearly triangular tailplane was largely forward of the rudder hinge. The elevators were rounded in plan.

The 1937 prototype S.21, the later S.21-St (S.21-II) and S.21M (S.21 III) all had fabric-covered, polygonal section fuselages formed from welded steel tubes. They differed in their seating arrangements; the prototype had side-by-side seats as did the S.21-St, though its seats were staggered longitudinally by 270 mm (10.6 in) to minimize width. The S.21M, like the S.21H, had tandem seats.

The S.21 lands on a rubber-sprung skid which reaches forward from mid-chord nearly to the nose.

== Operational history ==
The S.21H was much used as a trainer and also set new Swiss national records in all the two-seat class categories. Ten appeared on the Swiss register, one of which is still registered. Two more were built under licence in Italy as the Meteor S.21 Gabbiano, though the locally built CVV 6 Canguro proved more popular.

== Variants ==
S.21
1937 prototype with fabric-covered, steel tube fuselage. Side-by-side seating.

S.21-I (S-21H)
1938 Wooden-framed, ply-covered, oval section fuselage. Tandem seats. At least ten built.

S.21-II (S-21St)
Steel tube-framed fuselage, polygonal section fuselage. Staggered side-by-side seats. One only.

S.21-III (S-21M)
Steel fuselage, tandem seats. One only. (Note: The photo in reference 7 is not of the S.21St but the S.21M, as shown by registration number.)

Meteor S.21 Gabbiano
1951 Italian licence-built S-21H. Two only.

== Aircraft on display ==
- S.21H (HB-307), Verkehrshaus Schweiz, Lucerne
- S.21H (HB-355), Fliegermusum Altenrhein, Altenrhein
- S.21H (HB-357), Gliding Heritage Centre

== Specifications (Meteor S.21 Gabbiano) ==
Data from Pedrielli, V (2011)

General characteristics

- Crew: One
- Capacity: one passenger
- Length: 7.60 m (24 ft 11 in)
- Wingspan: 17.30 m (56 ft 9 in)
- Wing area: 20.20 m^{2} (217.4 sq ft)
- Aspect ratio: 15.20
- Empty weight: 219 kg (483 lb)
- Gross weight: 379 kg (836 lb)

Performance

- Maximum glide ratio: 21 (estimated)
