= Short Nimbus =

British two-seat glider, 1947

Nimbus

General information
- Type: 2-seater civilian glider trainer
- Manufacturer: Short Brothers
- Designer: Tom Weekes, Dudley Parkes
- Primary users: Rochester Gliding Club Shorts' Gliding Club, Belfast
- Number built: 1

History
- Manufactured: Rochester
- Introduction date: 1947
- First flight: 18 January 1947

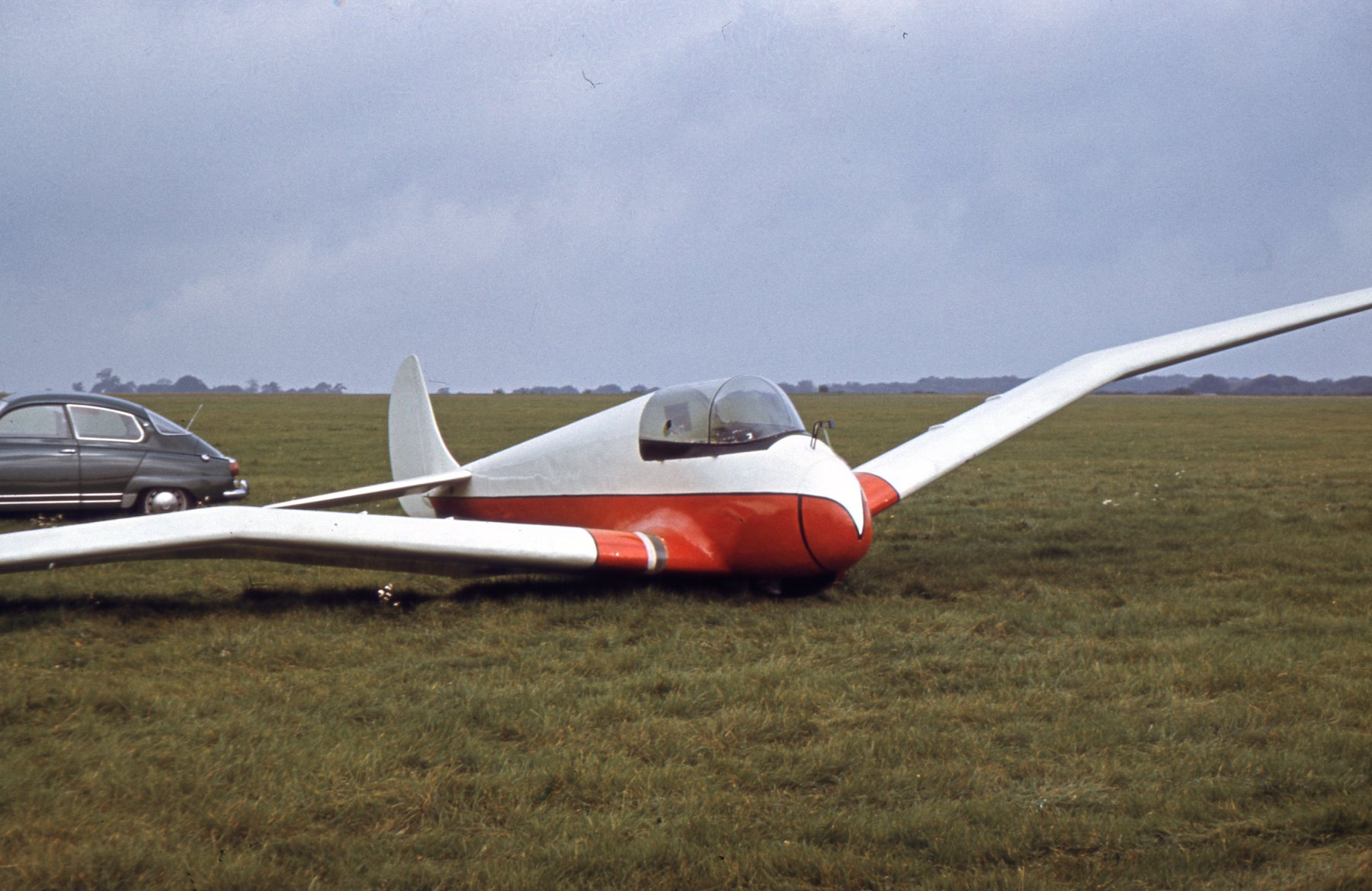
Short Nimbus

The Short Nimbus was a British two-seat glider trainer designed in 1947 by members of the Short Brothers design office, who had recently formed the Rochester Gliding Club. The company supported this venture by providing drawing-office and workshop facilities free of charge, assigning to the Nimbus one of its constructor's numbers (S.1312). The glider was registered with the British Gliding Association and given the serial number BGA470. The Nimbus was the last aircraft to be designed, built and flown from the Rochester works.

== Design ==
The Nimbus was a wooden, two-seater, gull-wing, low-wing glider trainer. The two pilots were housed in a tandem cockpit with a perspex hood. The tailplane was attached to the fuselage immediately forward of the single tail fin. The landing gear comprised a single, central, partly recessed landing-wheel below the rear pilot and a tail-skid below the fin.

=== RC Model ===
the Shorts Nimbus has been modelled by Jilles smits at 1/3 scale. Plans and Short Kit are available from Laser Cut Sailplanes here: https://lasercutsailplanes.co.uk/product/shorts-nimbus-short-kit-and-plan-from-jilles-smits/

== History ==
Although great interest was shown wherever the Nimbus was flown, only one provisional order was received, making it unviable as a commercial proposition. It took part in the SBAC's second air show in 1947 at Radlett and was placed second in the 1947 British Gliding Association's two-seater design category. After many years of service for various gliding clubs, including taking part in many competitions, it was acquired in 1985 as an exhibit by the Ulster Folk and Transport Museum in Cultra, Holywood, nr. Belfast, finally going on display in 1989 after restoration.

== Operators ==
United Kingdom

- Rochester Gliding Club
- Shorts Gliding Club, Belfast

== Specifications ==
Data from

General characteristics

- Crew: 2
- Length: 26 ft 10 in (8.18 m)
- Wingspan: 62 ft 0 in (18.90 m)
- Wing area: 230 sq ft (21 m^{2})
- Aspect ratio: 16:1
- Airfoil: Göttingen 535 / Clark Y
- Empty weight: 800 lb (363 kg)
- Gross weight: 1,200 lb (544 kg)

Performance

- Stall speed: 34 mph (55 km/h, 30 kn)
- Maximum glide ratio: 1:25.8 at 37.6 mph (60.5 km/h; 32.7 kn)
- Rate of sink: 2.3 ft/min (0.012 m/s)

== Sources ==
- Barnes, C. H.; James, D. N (1989). Shorts Aircraft since 1900. London: Putnam. ISBN 0-85177-819-4.
- Bridgman, Leonard (1948). Jane's All the World's Aircraft 1948. London: Sampson Low, Marston & Company, Ltd.
