= Spalinger S.25 =

S.25

General information
- Type: Two-seat training glider
- National origin: Switzerland
- Manufacturer: AG Wynau
- Designer: Jakob Spalinger
- Number built: 3

History
- First flight: June 1946
- Developed from: Spalinger S.21

The Spalinger S.25 is a 1940s development of the S.21 two seat trainer with much improved visibility from the rear seat. Three examples were completed, each different to the others.

== Design and development ==
When the design of the S.25 began in 1942 it was seen as a version of the two seat S.21 but the problem of providing a good view from the rear cockpit, which was under the wing in the S.21, whilst keeping it close to the c.g. resulted in a serious change in wing plan and with it, a change of designation. Though Switzerland remained neutral during World War II, associated supply restrictions delayed the completion of the S.25 and its first flight was not made until June 1946.

Like the S.21, the S.25 has a high-mounted, strut-braced gull wing. Apart from the revised plan, the two aircraft's wings are similar in construction, span and area. Both are built around a single spar with ply covering ahead of it forming a torsion-resistant D-box and have internal, angled drag struts from the inner spar to the wing mounting on the upper fuselage which act also as the rear of longer-chord D-boxes. Externally the wings are braced with a single strut on each side from spar to the fuselage keel. Both are fabric-covered behind spars and drag struts. The outer wings of both designs are straight-tapered out to elliptical tips and carry fabric-covered ailerons. However, the leading edge of the outer part of the S.25's wing is unswept over the outer 67% and the rest is reverse swept at about 11°. The straight trailing edge is parallel to the reverse-swept leading edge, continuing out to the tips. Both designs have airbrakes mounted on the rear of the spars, though the more angled drag struts of the S.25 allow its airbrakes to be wider.

With the rear seat now ahead of the wing leading edge, only the forward part of the fuselage of the S.25 differs from that of the S.21. The tandem seats are under a single, multi-framed canopy reaching back to the wing leading edge, though the upward field of view from the rear seat is enhanced by a transparency in the wing which extends back to the drag strut. The wing is attached to the upper fuselage instead of the S.21's pedestal, which provided headroom for its rear seat. Otherwise, the two designs share a wood-framed fuselage, oval in section and plywood-skinned. which tapers rearwards to a small fin that carries a large, curved balanced rudder with a rather pointed tip. Its nearly triangular tailplane is largely forward of the rudder hinge. The elevators are rounded in plan.

The S.25 lands on a rubber-sprung skid which reaches forward from mid-chord nearly to the nose.

Most of Spalinger's designs had wooden fuselages but he also built one-off, steel tube-framed versions of both the S.21 (the S.21-III or S.21M) and the S.25. The latter, like the wooden S.25, was completed in 1946 and was designated the S.24 even though it seems to have flown after the wooden original. It appears on the Swiss register as the S.25M.

In Brazil a second S.25 was built with Spalinger's approval by two Swiss nationals, Hans Widmer and Hendrich Kurt in 1954. Designated S.25A, it has a revised canopy which provided more headroom and a monowheel for landing.

== Operational history ==
In 1947 the two pilots Hans Würth and K. Haberstich brought the S.25 to England for the National Gliding Contests based at Bramcote. They did not compete but set a new Swiss two-seat glider distance record of 210 km (130 mi; 110 nmi) with a flight to the east coast of Norfolk. Members of the Great Hucklow-based Derbyshire and Lancashire Gliding Club taking part in the contest saw it and expressed an interest in its purchase, so it was air-towed to their ground. After several months of testing did not lead to a sale, the S.25 was air-towed back home.

The Brazilian S.25A PT-PBR was bought by the Aeroclub de Bauru. It was placed third in the 1955 Brazilian National Gliding Championships and continued to compete for that club until at least December 2014.

The history of the metal-framed S.25M is not known in detail. Owned by Peter Kindler, it remains on the Swiss register in June 2019 as HB-437.

== Variants ==
S.25
Swiss built example with wooden fuselage. One only.
S.25A
Brazilian example built in 1954, with modified, raised canopy and a landing wheel. One only.
S.24
Swiss example with tube-frame fuselage. One only, sometimes referred to as the S.25M.

== Specifications (S.25) ==
Data from j2mc planeurs - Spalinger S-25

General characteristics

- Crew: Two
- Length: 8.4 m (27 ft 7 in)
- Wingspan: 17.7 m (58 ft 1 in)
- Height: 1.45 m (4 ft 9 in)
- Wing area: 20.5 m^{2} (221 sq ft)
- Aspect ratio: 15.3
- Airfoil: Göttingen Gö 535
- Empty weight: 250 kg (551 lb)
- Gross weight: 410 kg (904 lb)

Performance

- Stall speed: 65 km/h (40 mph, 35 kn) minimum speed
- Maximum glide ratio: 22 at 92 km/h (57 mph)
- Rate of sink: 0.75 m/s (148 ft/min) minimum at 70 km/h (43 mph)
