= SZD-35 Bekas =

Polish two-seat glider, 1970

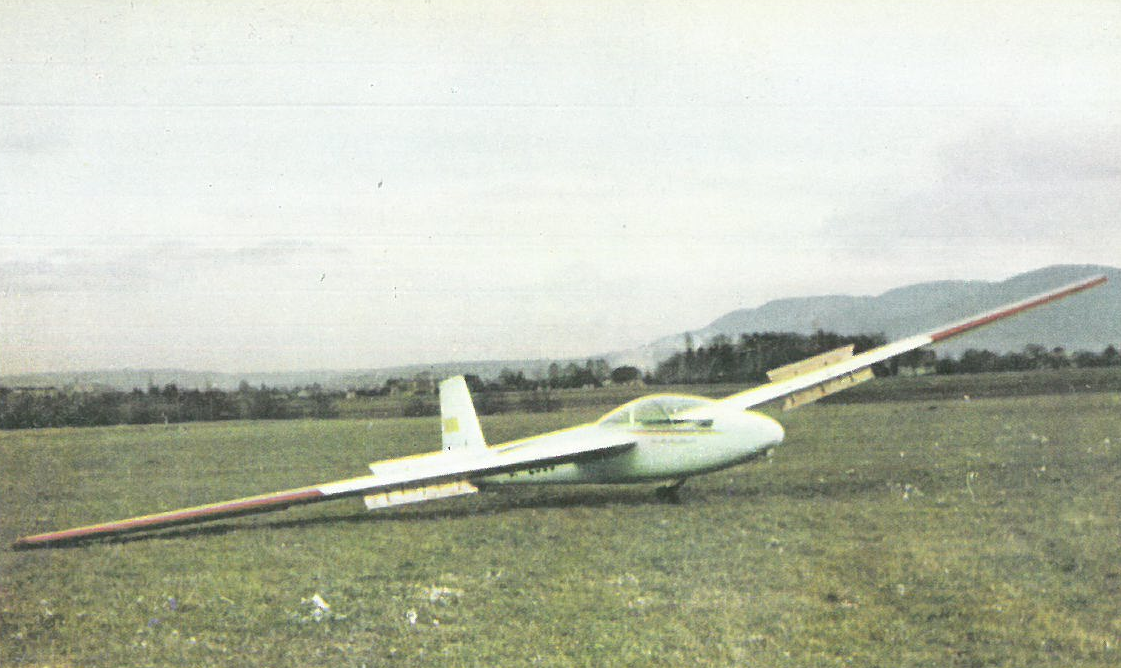

General information
- Type: Glider
- National origin: Poland
- Designer: T. Łabuć and J. Niespał
- Number built: 2

History
- First flight: 29 November 1970
- Developed from: PZL Bielsko SZD-34 Bocian 3

The SZD-35 Bekas (Snipe) is a two-seater glider aircraft that was designed and built in Poland.

== Development ==
The SZD-35 Bekas is a direct development of the SZD-34 Bocian 3, a modernised Bocian with T-tail and refined aerodynamics, design of which had been completed by engineer George Kubalańca, but further design work led to the SZD-35 Bekas for export to the DDR (the former East Germany), and the abandonment of the SZD-34.

To complement the SZD-30 Pirat gliders purchased by the DDR, the design team at SZD developed the SZD-35 Bekas specifically to fill the requirements of the DDR aero-clubs, with all-wood structure. The Bekas was also designed to comply with portions of the British BCAR airworthiness requirements.

Two flying prototypes were built (SP-2553 and SP-2557) and a third for static testing. Flight tests commenced on 29 November 1970, flown by Adam Zientek. The second prototype first flew in March 1971 culminating in a destructive test of the undercarriage with the aircraft undergoing progressively harsh landings until damage occurred. Modifications to the structure were introduced after these tests to increase strength and reduce weight. The Bekas had safe handling and high spin resistance, but suffered from high cockpit sills, which hampered boarding and limited headroom due to the low canopy.

To comply with the DDR requirements the structure of the Bekas was primarily of wood with plywood skinning except for a small percentage of the wing surface. The undercarriage consisted of a sprung monowheel, set well forward of the centre of gravity, and tail-skid, which improved stability on the ground roll during winch launching but raised the cockpit sill hampering boarding the aircraft.

The DDR cancelled their order and production was cancelled. The two Bekas prototypes have survived, with one in the Aeroclub Gliwice museum and the other at the Rzeszów Aeroclub.

== 2007 accident ==
On October 15th, 2007 the SZD-35 Bekas owned by the Rzeszów Aeroclub has crashed into trees after performing a gravity start from the Bezmiechowa altiport in Bezmiechowa Górna. One of the pilots has died, the other one was heavily injured. The glider has been completely destroyed in the crash.

== Specifications (SZD-35 Bekas) ==
Data from Piechowski

General characteristics

- Crew: 1 pilot
- Capacity: 1 passenger
- Length: 8.5 m (27 ft 10 in)
- Wingspan: 15.9 m (52 ft 2 in)
- Height: 1.87 m (6 ft 2 in)
- Wing area: 19.8 m^{2} (213 sq ft)
- Aspect ratio: 12.9
- Airfoil: Wortmann FX 61-163 > Fx 60-1261
- Empty weight: 335 kg (739 lb)
- Gross weight: 540 kg (1,191 lb)

Performance

- Maximum speed: 220 km/h (137 mph, 119 kn)
- Stall speed: 60 km/h (37 mph, 32 kn)
- Maximum glide ratio: 27.4 at 84 km/h (52 mph)
- Rate of sink: 0.82 m/s (161 ft/min) at 74 km/h (46 mph)

== See also ==
- SZD-9 Bocian
