= Sayers S.C.W. =

S.C.W

General information
- Type: single seat glider
- National origin: United Kingdom
- Manufacturer: Central Aircraft Co., London
- Designer: W. H. Sayers with F. T. Courtney and M. E A. Wright
- Number built: 1

History
- First flight: 1922

The Sayers S.C.W. was a single seat monoplane glider, designed specifically for the first British gliding competition held at Itford Hill in 1922, an endurance event. Unresolved control problems stopped it from making any competitive flights, but it flew successfully later in the year. It was destroyed on the ground by a storm in December 1922.

== Design ==
In August 1922 the Daily Mail newspaper offered a £1,000 prize for the longest duration flight by an unpowered, heavier than air aircraft. The competition was to be organized by the Royal Aero Club, who chose the site (Itford Hill, on the Sussex South Downs near Lewes) and the date (16–21 October). This gave competitors six weeks to design, build and transport their entries. 13 arrived in time and one of these was the Sayers S.C.W glider, competition number 17, to be flown by F. Courtney.

S.C.W. stood for Sayers, Courtney and Wright, the three designers. Their product was influenced by the Hannover Vampyr, which had won the recent German competition at the Wasserkuppe, but there were significant differences in both construction and aerodynamics. A contemporary report claimed that the S.C.W. had been designed in 19 hr and built in 19 days. It was a wooden high wing cantilever monoplane. Its wing was of two spar construction, the spars built up from spruce with plywood webs. The wings were plywood covered ahead of the forward spar and fabric covered aft, with an almost rectangular plan of constant chord out nearly to the slightly bevelled wing tips. At 7.7, the aspect ratio was less than on the Vampyr (10.8) and the airfoil was also different. Whereas the Vampire used the "Göttingen 441". Archived from the original on 22 March 2012. airfoil (as did the Handasyde glider that came second at the Itford competition), the S.C.W. used the flat-bottomed T.62 section intended for propellers. Like the Handasyde, the S.C.W. had triangular ailerons reaching to the wing tips where their chord was greatest.

The Vampyr and S.C.W. were most alike, and most different from most later glider designs, in the great depths of their fuselages. The S.C.W. fuselage had a rectangular cross-section with a length to depth ratio of just over 4, though the underside aft of the wings sloped strongly upwards so that the fuselage profile was close to rhomboidal, with the nose falling away in front. It was largely fabric covered, except in areas such as the forward underside and tail, which had the protection of plywood. The single open cockpit was placed just under the leading edge of the wing. The all-moving tailplane was hinged by its forward spar to the extreme rear of the fuselage, projecting well behind it. A wide chord fin, rounded close to the fuselage and straight edged further aft carried the rudder on a vertical hinge; this surface had a straight, vertical trailing edge and rounded corners, its lower edge far enough above the elevator to allow the latter's deflection.

The original undercarriage design had two skids, one hinged to each of the horizontal lower fuselage longerons, with their rear ends free to slide under deflection. Another, small skid protected the high rear fuselage. The skids may later have been replaced with a pair of wheels and nose bumpers added.

== Operational history ==
Though the S.C.W. arrived at Itford late on Saturday 14 October, the first of two practice days, it took some time to prepare it for flight. Bad weather on Thursday gave several teams a chance to repair or modify their aircraft and the S.C.W. was reported as "practically completed"; late on Friday it finally flew. It was a short flight though, and control problems remained. No formal competition flights were made.

The S.C.W remained at Itford after the competition and the control problems were gradually solved. It flew successfully for 1.5 miles (2.4 km) on 17 December 1922, followed by a good landing. Later that month it was destroyed in a storm which blew down the tent in which it was housed.

== Specifications ==
Data from British gliders and sailplanes

General characteristics

- Capacity: 1
- Length: 22 ft 5 in (6.83 m)
- Wingspan: 42 ft 6 in (12.95 m)
- Wing area: 235.0 sq ft (21.83 m^{2})
- Aspect ratio: 7.7
- Airfoil: T.62, a propeller profile
- Empty weight: 180 lb (82 kg)
- Gross weight: 360 lb (163 kg)

Performance

- Wing loading: 1.51 lb/sq ft (7.37 kg/m^{2})
