= Schweizer cargo glider designs =

The Schweizer cargo glider designs were a series of design proposals made to the United States Army Air Forces by the Schweizer Aircraft Corporation of Elmira, New York during the Second World War. None of the designs was accepted by the USAAF and no cargo gliders were built by Schweizer during the war.

The four designs proposed are of note due to having been assigned Schweizer model numbers. Due to the lack of production of these designs, Schweizer concentrated on designing and building the TG-2 and TG-3 training gliders instead. When the training glider contracts were completed Schweizer turned to subcontract work for other aircraft manufacturers. This trend continued after the war when Schweizer would increasingly turn to subcontract work to supplement the small amount of revenue realized from designing and building gliders.

== Background ==
The German use of glider-borne attack on the Belgian fortress of Eben-Emael and their use in the Battle of Crete convinced the US military that they would need glider-borne forces of their own.

The US Army had no glider pilot training program. Neither did they have any training or assault gliders when the war began. The USAAF, the US Navy and Marines all embarked on ambitious glider programs, starting in April 1941, some nine months prior to the Attack on Pearl Harbor and US entry into the war.

Once the services had commenced procurement of training gliders, such as the Frankfort TG-1 and Schweizer TG-2 and schools were being set up, military attention turned to development of operational gliders for air assault use.

== Cargo glider specification ==
The USAAF developed a specification for two types of combat cargo gliders. The specifications required manufacturers to submit proposals for:

- Cargo glider, nine seat, landing speed of no more than 38 mph (62 km/h) with no flaps
- Cargo glider, fifteen seat, landing speed of no more than 38 mph (62 km/h) with no flaps

The low landing speed was intended to ensure that even if the gliders impacted trees or other hard obstacles on combat landings that troop survival would be likely. The specification required that the glider designs not include flaps to make the gliders cheap and simple to build and also to simplify pilot training.

== Company response ==
Schweizer submitted one design each in response to the specification. The Schweizer brothers considered the specification flawed, as an aircraft that would land at 38 mph without flaps would require very low wing loading. To design an aircraft with a very low wing loading, but able to carry nine or fifteen troops, would require a very large wing, rendering the resulting aircraft cumbersome on the ground, especially on windy days.

The designs that were submitted complied with the USAAF specification, but were considered by the company to be impractical. In the long run, the Schweizer's concerns with the specification were taken seriously and the requirements were later changed to allow higher landing speeds and the use of flaps, making the resulting gliders smaller and more useful.

Schweizer also developed designs for six-place and single-place cargo gliders for military use. Like the earlier designs, none were put into production.

Schweizer aircraft did not submit revised designs for the new specification, but instead concentrated on production of the army TG-2 and the navy and marine LNS-1 along with the new wooden structure TG-3. The TG-3 was designed to avoid the use of strategic materials, such as aluminum and took a large measure of company resources to design and produce in numbers. The company also moved into subcontract work for other companies, producing assemblies and components.

After the war the specialization in subcontract work led Schweizer Aircraft to produce whole aircraft under sub-contract, such as the Grumman Ag Cat agricultural aircraft and the Hughes 300 helicopter, for which it later purchased the rights, renaming it the Schweizer 300.

== Models ==
SGC 9-10
In keeping with Schweizer's normal glider model nomenclature the troop glider designed to the nine-place specification was the SGC 9-10, or Schweizer Glider, Cargo, 9 seat, model 10. Some sources call it the SGC 8-10, indicating eight seats.

SGC 15-11
The Schweizer Glider, Cargo, 15 seat, model 11 was submitted in response to the USAAF specification for a fifteen seat cargo glider.

SGC 6-14
The Schweizer Glider, Cargo, 6 seat, model 14 was a design for a six seat cargo glider.

SGC 1-15
The Schweizer Glider, Cargo, 1 seat, model 15 was a design for a single seat cargo glider.

== Contract Results ==
The winning contender for the original contract for the nine-seat glider was the Waco Aircraft Company. Their design became the Waco CG-3. Due to the limitations of the specification, the aircraft was not a success and the initial order of 300 was reduced to 100, with the intention to use them as trainers for the follow-on fifteen seat assault glider.

WACO's fifteen seat design was also chosen as the winner in the competition for the modified specification. This aircraft served with great success as the Waco CG-4. Almost 14,000 were built and it played a role in the July 1943 Allied invasion of Sicily, the American airborne landings in Normandy on 6 June 1944 and in other important airborne assaults in Europe and in the China-Burma-India Theater.

== See also ==
List of gliders
