= Schneider Grunau 8 =

German two-seat glider, 1933

Grunau 8
- Schneider Grünau 8

General information
- Type: Two seat trainer glider
- National origin: Germany
- Manufacturer: Edmund Schneider Grunau
- Designer: Edmund Schneider and Wolf Hirth
- Number built: 1

History
- First flight: 1933 or slightly later

The Schneider Grunau 8 was a simple, two-seat trainer glider designed and built in Germany in the early 1930s.

== Design and development ==
The Grunau 8, designed by Wolf Hirth and Edmund Schneider, was a wood and fabric tandem two-seat training glider with a strut-braced high wing, swept back at 5° and with 1.5° of dihedral, built around two raked spars. It was fabric covered apart from a plywood-skinned leading edge. Constant-chord inner sections occupied some 40% of the span, braced from the spars near the panel ends to the lower fuselage longerons by two parallel lift struts. The forward pair of these struts was streamlined and had near vertical jury struts. The outboard panels were straight tapered to rounded wing tips, the aft spar running straight from the wing root to tip and mounting slightly tapered ailerons.

The fuselage of the Grunau 8 had a deep-sided hexagonal cross section with a rounded nose and a continuous open, tandem cockpit with the rear seat under the wing, well behind its leading edge. The wing was supported over the cockpits by six struts, two inverted Vs from the upper longerons to the spars and a pair of cross-bracing diagonals. Behind the rear spar the wing root merged into the upper rear fuselage which tapered aft to a rectangular rear section. An isosceles trapezium shaped tailplane was mounted on top of the fuselage and braced to the short fin. The flat-topped balanced rudder was taller than the fin, together forming a straight-tapered vertical tail with the rudder reaching down to the keel via an elevator cut-out. A sprung skid reached from the nose to under mid-chord with a pair of fixed wheels on a short axle above it towards its rear end, though the Grunau 8 sometimes flew without them. There was also a small tailskid.

The sole Grunau 8 first flew sometime between 1933 and 1935 after Schneider's designation system had changed; the Schneider Grunau 7 Moazagotl flew in 1933 and the Grunau 8 appears in Vogelsang's book, published in 1935. Capable of being launched by aero-tow, the Grunau 8 initially carried the name Stella on its nose and wings.

== Specifications ==
Data from Flugzeug-Typenbuch. Handbuch der deutschen Luftfahrt- 1936, Flugzeug-Typenbuch. Handbuch der deutschen Luftfahrt- 1944

General characteristics

- Crew: Two
- Length: 5.78 m (19 ft 0 in)

7 m (23 ft) folded / de-rigged

- Wingspan: 14.5 m (47 ft 7 in)
- Width: 1.2 m (3 ft 11 in) folded / de-rigged
- Height: 1.60 m (5 ft 3 in)
- Wing area: 22.0 m^{2} (237 sq ft) including ailerons
- Aspect ratio: 9.57
- Airfoil: Göttingen 619 from roots outboard to symmetric tips
- Empty weight: 190 kg (419 lb) solo & dual
- Gross weight: 275 kg (606 lb) solo

360 kg (794 lb) dual

Performance

- Cruise speed: 58 km/h (36 mph, 31 kn) approximately
- g limits: +8.6 (solo ultimate)

+8 (dual ultimate)

- Maximum glide ratio: 1:14 at 54 km/h (34 mph) (dual)
- Rate of sink: 0.8 m/s (160 ft/min) solo

1.1 m/s (4 ft/s) dual

- Wing loading: 12.5 kg/m^{2} (2.6 lb/sq ft) solo

16.35 kg/m^{2} (3.35 lb/sq ft) dual
