= SZD-26 Wilk =

Polish two-seat motor glider, not built

General information
- Type: Motor-Glider
- National origin: Poland
- Manufacturer: PZL Bielsko (planned)
- Designer: Borys Puzej & Bogumił Szuba
- Status: abandoned
- Number built: not built

The SZD-26 Wilk (Wolf, SZD standing for Szybowcowy Zakład Doświadczalny, or Experimental Glider Department) was a projected two-seat motor-glider designed in Poland in 1961. A unique design in many aspects, it never entered serial production.

== Development ==
The SZD-26 was designed as a twin boom motor glider with a pusher propeller and the engine located in the rear of the central nacelle which also housed the tandem cockpit. The tricycle undercarriage was designed to retract rearwards into the nacelle, under the cockpit and either side of the engine. The two-bladed propeller was designed to stop when level with the wings to reduce drag with the engine off. Lack of a suitable powerplant stopped further work on the SZD-26 Wilk.

== Specifications (SZD-26 Wilk) ==
Data from http://www.piotrp.de/SZYBOWCE/pszd26.htm

General characteristics

- Crew: 1 pilot
- Capacity: 1 passenger
- Length: 7.8 m (25 ft 7 in)
- Wingspan: 18.7 m (61 ft 4 in)

Performance
