= Suchý =

- Municipality
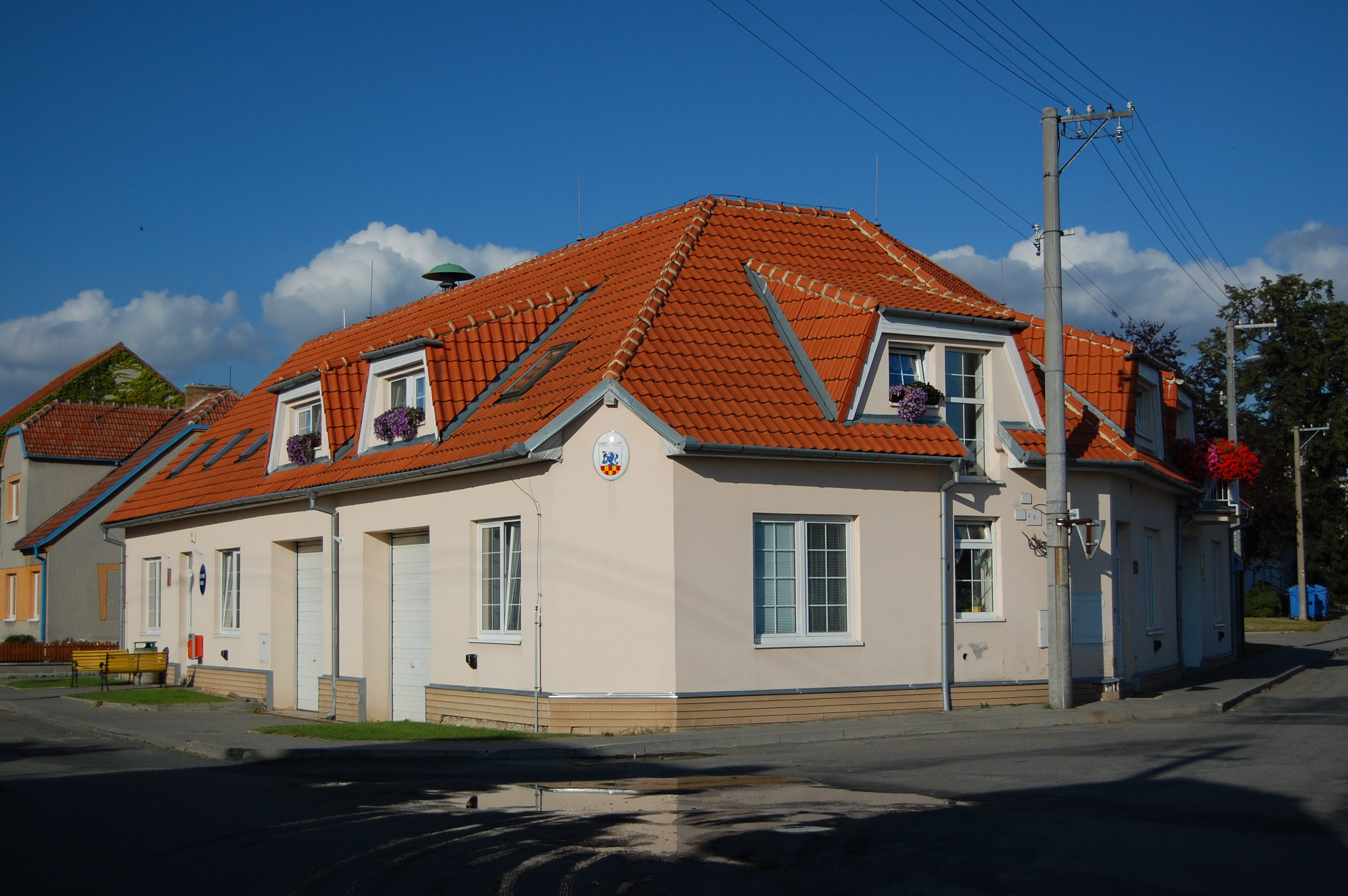
- Municipal office

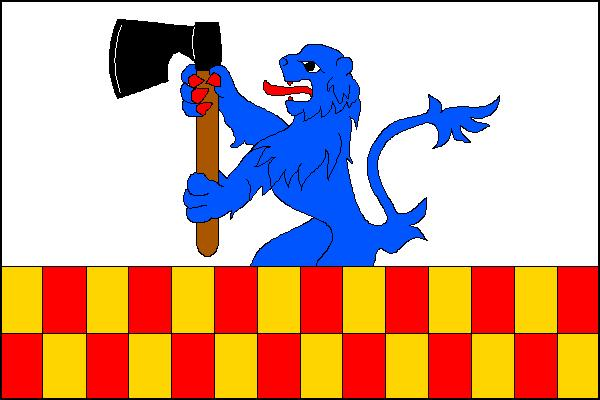
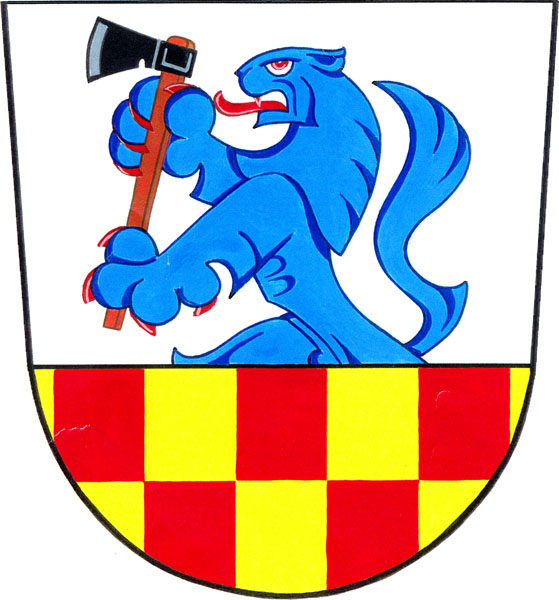
- Flag Coat of arms

- Location in the Czech Republic
- Coordinates: 49°28′58″N 16°45′45″E
- Country: Czech Republic
- Region: South Moravian
- District: Blansko
- First mentioned: 1762

Area
  - Total: 3.79 km^{2} (1.46 sq mi)
- Elevation: 663 m (2,175 ft)

Population (2026-01-01)
  - Total: 469
  - Density: 124/km^{2} (321/sq mi)
- Time zone: UTC+1 (CET)
  - Summer (DST): UTC+2 (CEST)
- Postal code: 680 01
- Website: www.obecsuchy.cz

Suchý is a municipality and village in Blansko District in the South Moravian Region of the Czech Republic. It has about 500 inhabitants.

== Geography ==
Suchý is located about 15 kilometres (9 mi) northeast of Blansko and 31 km (19 mi) north of Brno. It lies in the Drahany Highlands. The highest point is at 706 m (2,316 ft) above sea level. The village is located on the shore of the fishpond Sušský rybník, which, however, is situated outside the municipal territory.

== Demographics ==
Historical population
Year	Pop.	±%
1869	248	—
1880	283	+14.1%
1890	303	+7.1%
1900	346	+14.2%
1910	350	+1.2%
1921	363	+3.7%
1930	407	+12.1%
1950	384	−5.7%
1961	421	+9.6%
1970	398	−5.5%
1980	368	−7.5%
1991	370	+0.5%
2001	367	−0.8%
2011	425	+15.8%
2021	440	+3.5%
Source: Censuses
