= Siegel MS 1 =

General information
- Type: Foot-launched glider
- National origin: Poland
- Designer: Mieczysław Siegel
- Number built: 1

History
- First flight: 1923

The Siegel MS 1 was a very light, simple, foot-launched glider designed, financed, built and flown by a Polish schoolteacher in the 1923 summer holidays. It made some short hops but was easily damaged.

== Design and development ==
Mieczysław Siegel, a schoolteacher from Skrynice near Lublin, designed and built his first aircraft in 1923. It was a simple, small and very light foot-launched glider. He made several brief lights, though contemporary reports do not make it clear if these were foot-launched or if the MS 1 was tethered like a kite. During these tests the fragile glider was often damaged and repaired but, late in 1923, Siegel's attention turned to its successor, the MS 2.

The MS 1 was a wooden framed aircraft, unusually covered with a mixture of cardboard and wrapping paper. Its one piece, twin spar wing, mounted on top of the fuselage, was rectangular in plan out to a little over half span then became trapezoidal. Covered with paper stiffened with gelatin, it was wire-braced from the lower fuselage and from an inverted-V cabane strut over the fuselage. Wing warping rather than ailerons provided lateral control.

The rectangular section fuselage tapered to the rear. Between the wings the upper and lower surface coverings were absent, opening a space which the pilot could sit, strapped to the glider on a bicycle seat, with his feet on the ground. He launched the MS 1 by running, taking the glider forward.

The MS 1's broad chord, triangular tailplane was mounted on top of the fuselage and began not far aft of the wing trailing edge. It carried a single-piece elevator. Unusually, its long, rounded fin was under the fuselage and the trapezoidal rudder ran up to the fuselage top, just below the elevator.

A pair of short skids, cross-braced and each mounted under the nose on a V-strut, together with the pilot's legs provided the MS 1's landing gear, assisted by the lower edge of the fin which doubled as a tailskid.

== Specifications ==
Data from Samolotypolskie.pl

General characteristics

- Crew: One
- Length: 4 m (13 ft 1 in)
- Wingspan: 6.6 m (21 ft 8 in)
- Height: 1.7 m (5 ft 7 in)
- Wing area: 8 m^{2} (86 sq ft)
- Aspect ratio: 5.4
- Empty weight: 25 kg (55 lb)
- Gross weight: 95 kg (209 lb)
