= Spalinger S.15 =

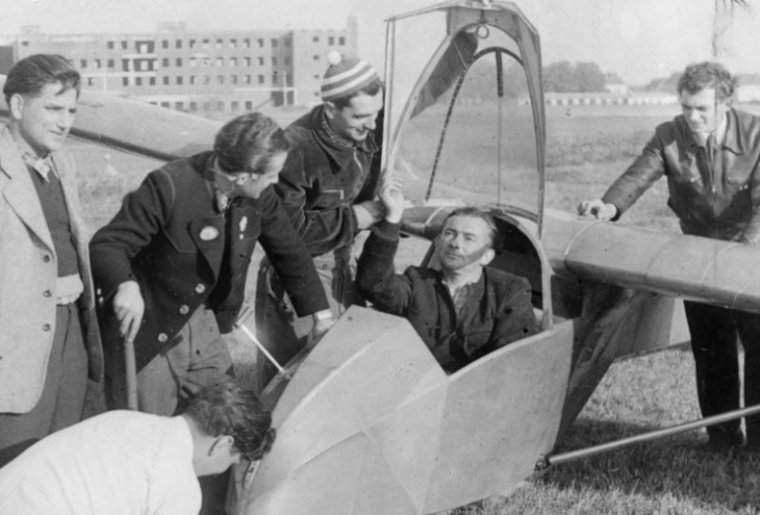

General information
- Type: Single seat training glider
- National origin: Switzerland
- Designer: Jakob Spalinger
- Number built: At least 26, mostly S.15Ks.

History
- First flight: 1930

The Spalinger S.15 is a Swiss, single-seat training glider first flown in 1930. There were several variants, of which only the 1934 S.15K was serially produced. One restored example remains active in 2019.

== Design and development ==
The 1930 S.15 led to Jakob Spalinger's long series of wooden, gull wing gliders. The earlier versions of the type are not well recorded but all had high wings with rectangular inner panels, tapered outer panels and pairs of single external bracing struts. They lacked the gull wing which characterized later Spalinger designs; this only appeared in 1934 with the aerobatic S.15K. Many of its features were maintained in his later aircraft.

The S.15K has a single spar wing, with central, internal diagonal drag struts. In front of the spar and struts the wing is plywood-covered, forming torsion resistant D-boxes. The rest of the surface is fabric-covered. The wing is mounted on the top of the fuselage rather than on the short pedestal of the earlier variants and braced on each side by a single strut from the spar to the lower fuselage. Between these struts the inner 25% of the span has about 8° of dihedral, with 0° beyond. The central third of the span is rectangular in plan; beyond, the wing is straight-tapered, mostly on the trailing edges, out to elliptical tips. Ailerons occupy most of the tapered trailing edges.

Its fuselage is a ply-covered, hexagonal section structure with deep vertical sides. The nose is blunt and the cockpit just ahead of the wing leading edge. Some had open cockpits, others one-piece, rear-hinged canopies. A short landing skid runs back a little beyond the wing bracing struts. The fuselage narrows aft to a conventional tail with a narrow, short, ply-covered fin carrying a rounded, slightly pointed, largely fabric-covered balanced rudder which reaches down to the keel. The roughly triangular but blunt tipped horizontal tail is mounted on top of the fuselage, forward of the rudder hinge. The tailplane has ply-reinforced leading edges but elsewhere, like the elevators, is fabric covered.

The earlier S.15 variants differed from each other chiefly in span and aspect ratio according to their intended role, though the shortest span variant, the S.15A, was not completed. Only the S.15K reached production, with twenty-one built. Details and dates are given below.

== Operational history ==
The S.15 filled the same training role as that of the Grunau Baby in Germany and was able to exploit thermals to set local records. Though the details of most of these flights are lacking, the high performing S.15C Milan recorded one of over three hours.

Ten S.15Ks remained on the Swiss register into the 1950s, a few flying on to the end of the 1960s. Two were sold to Belgium in 1951 and one of these, originally HB-449 but OO-ZIW after its move, was restored to flight in 2015 as HB-449 again. In 2019 it is the only Spalinger S.15 flying.

== Variants ==
S.15
First flight 1930, 16.7 m (54 ft 9 in) span, aspect ratio 17.
S.15A Austria II
1932, 11.5 m (37 ft 9 in) span, aspect ratio 9.6. Intended for basic instruction. Construction begun in 1930 but not completed.
S.15B
First flight 1933, 14 m (45 ft 11 in) span. An enlarged S.15A intended for advanced instruction and performance. 2 built.
S.15C Milan
First flight 28 March 1932, from Milan. 16.5 m (54 ft 2 in) span, aspect ratio 17. 1 built.
S.15K
First flight 1934. Gull wing with 14.6 m (47 ft 11 in) span, aspect ratio 15. Only production variant, 21 built.

== Specifications (S.15K) ==
Data from j2mc planeurs

General characteristics

- Crew: One
- Length: 5.95 m (19 ft 6 in)
- Wingspan: 14.60 m (47 ft 11 in)
- Wing area: 14.2 m^{2} (153 sq ft)
- Aspect ratio: 15
- Airfoil: Göttingen 535
- Empty weight: 118 kg (260 lb)
- Gross weight: 208 kg (459 lb)

Performance

- Maximum glide ratio: 21 best
- Rate of sink: 0.7 m/s (140 ft/min) minimum
