= PZL SZD-30 Pirat =

Polish single-seat glider, 1966

SZD-30 Pirat
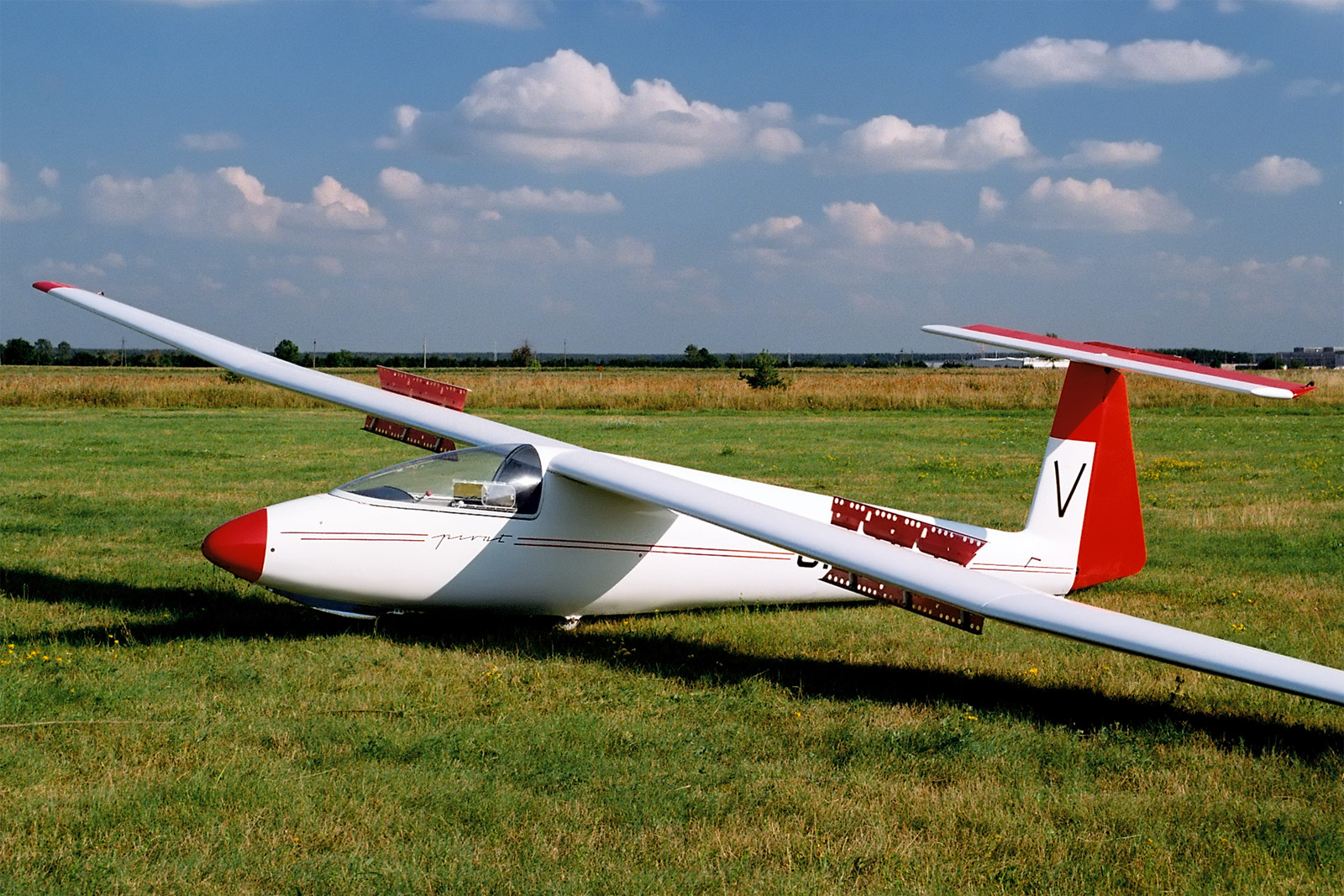
- SZD-30 Pirat at EPSU, August 2007

General information
- Type: Club-class, formerly Standard-class sailplane
- National origin: Poland
- Manufacturer: PZL Bielsko
- Designer: Jerzy Smielkiewicz
- Number built: 776 (1967-1980)

History
- Introduction date: 1967
- First flight: 19 May 1966

The SZD-30 Pirat is a single-seat multipurpose glider aircraft from the Polish firm PZL Bielsko which first flew in 1966, and began production in 1967.

== Development ==
The SZD-30 is largely constructed out of wood. The high-mounted wing incorporates air brakes on both the upper and lower surfaces. The inner section of the wing is constant-chord and the outer section is tapered.

The forward section of the otherwise all-wood fuselage is made of fiberglass. The single-wheel main landing gear is fixed, the formed one-piece canopy is side-mounted, the fuselage can be equipped with radios and an oxygen system. There are also two baggage compartments.

== Variants ==
- SZD-30 – Initial production version
- SZD-30B – A single prototype
- SZD-30C – Later production version, with smaller partially balanced ailerons made of fiberglass, and a larger cockpit. The first -30C flew on 10 January 1978.

== Operational limitations ==
In 2011, following a number of cases of glue failure in the wooden joints, leading to structural failure, the type certificate holder issued a bulletin which reduced a number of the limiting speeds of the aircraft. Specifically, the maximum speed (V_{NE}) was reduced to 195 km/h (121 mph, 105 knots) and aerobatic flight was prohibited.

== Specifications ==
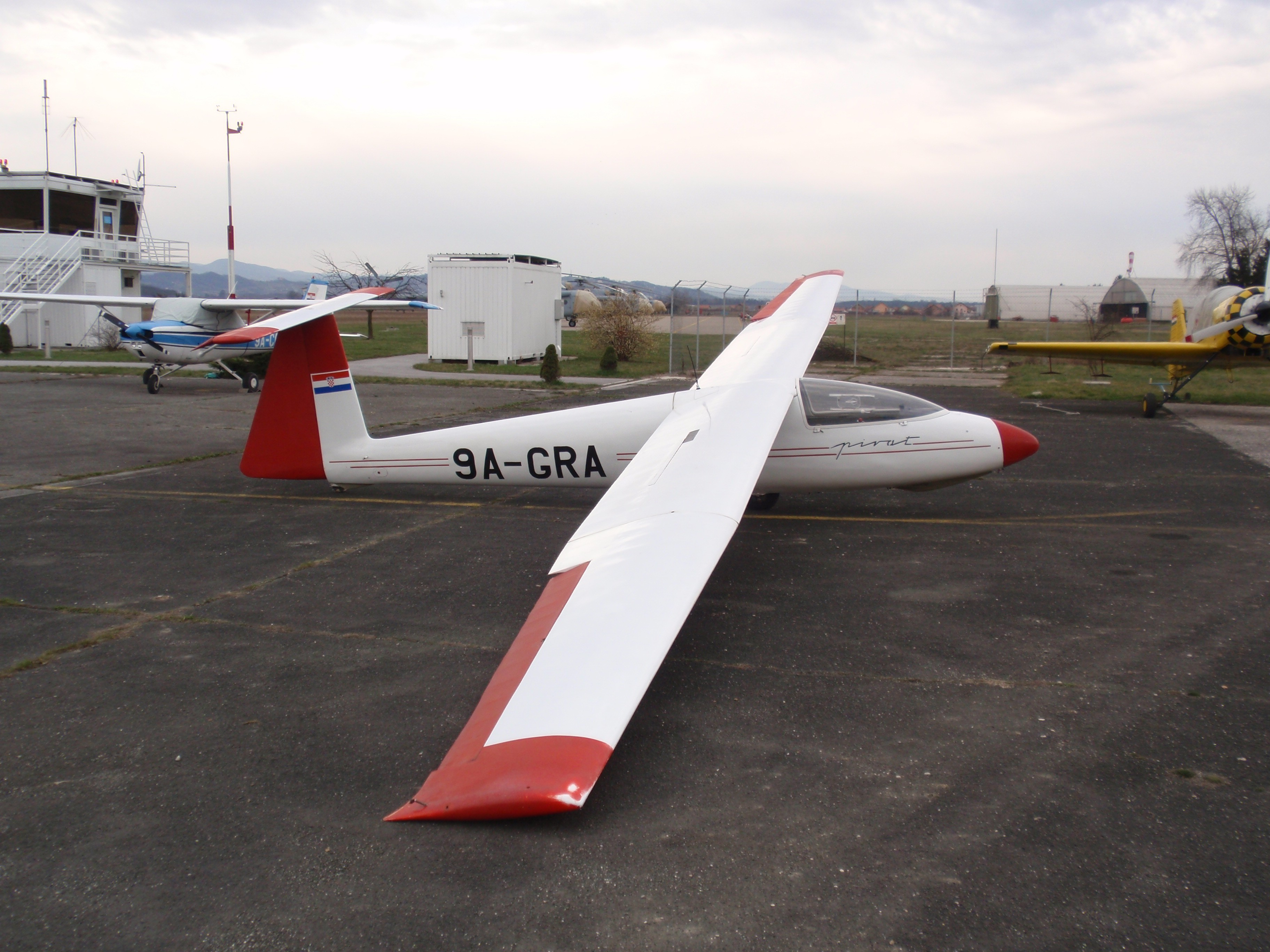
SZD-30 Pirat

Data from Australian Gliding Museum

General characteristics

- Crew: 1
- Length: 6.86 m (22 ft 6 in)
- Wingspan: 15.00 m (49 ft 3 in)
- Height: 0.96 m (3 ft 2 in)
- Wing area: 13.8 m^{2} (148.5 sq ft)
- Aspect ratio: 16.3
- Airfoil: FX-61-168/60-1261
- Empty weight: 260 kg (573 lb)
- Gross weight: 370 kg (816 lb)

Performance

- Maximum speed: 250 km/h (155 mph, 135 kn)
- Stall speed: 60.2 km/h (37.4 mph, 32.5 kn)
- Maximum glide ratio: 33
- Rate of sink: 0.70 m/s (138 ft/min)

== See also ==
- List of gliders
