= Spalinger S.18 =

Swiss 1930s performance sailplane

General information
- Type: High performance, single seat sailplane
- National origin: Switzerland
- Manufacturer: AG Wynau Kanton Bern
- Designer: Jakob Spalinger
- Number built: More than 57

History
- First flight: 24 May 1936

The Spalinger S.18 is a Swiss 1930s performance sailplane. Several variants were built and the S.18 dominated Swiss contests and set records for nearly a decade. Many were active into the 1960s and four remain on the Swiss register.

== Design and development ==
In the 1930s Jakob Spalinger designed and built a series of wooden, gull-winged gliders. His 1936 S.18 had a 13.3 m (43 ft 8 in) span and modest performance but good handling. Later variants with longer spans improved performance and the type became the dominant Swiss sailplane.

The Spalinger S.18 has a high wing with rectangular plan inner panels. On the S.18 II these extend out to 40% span, with strong dihedral over their inner 55% and slight anhedral beyond. The tapered outer panels continue this anhedral out to elliptical tips which have dihedral. The wing has a single main spar with plywood forward of it around the leading edge forming a torsion-resisting D-box. Drag loads are taken by internal diagonal struts from the main spar to the fuselage, also with ply covering ahead of them. Behind the spar and struts the wing is fabric-covered, as are the ailerons that occupy most of the outer panels. Only the S.18 III variant has airbrakes.

The wing is mounted on a short, vertical extension of the otherwise oval section, ply-covered fuselage. The enclosed cockpit is ahead of the leading edge. Most S.18 IIs had an opening transparency plus fixed windscreen, though one at least had a bubble canopy; S.18 IIIs have a contoured, multi-part canopy without the profile step of a steep windscreen. Behind the wing the fuselage tapers to an integral, short, vertical, faired mounting for the S.18's full, curved and fabric-covered balanced rudder. The triangular tailplane and rounded elevators are mounted on top of the fuselage, well ahead of the rudder. The elevators are fabric-covered apart from ply reinforcement of their leading edges and hinges.

The S.18 lands on a sprung skid which reached from nose to below mid-chord and a small tail-bumper.

== Operational history ==
The 1936 Berlin Olympic Games had gliding events associated with them at which the prototype S18 I gave an aerobatic display and two of them took part in competitions .

First flown 13 June 1937, the longer (14.3 m (46 ft 11 in)) span S.18 II won the first Swiss glider championship, held that autumn. This variant set at least two Swiss distance records; the best of these was flown on 15 July 1939 when Max Schachenmann covered 216 km (134 mi). In 1937 Hermann Schrieber built a one-off version of the S.18 II, the S.18 T Choucas (Jackdaw), which had positive dihedral on the outer panels to give enhanced aerobatic stability. This aircraft did well at the 1937 Internationals, held in Germany. Schreiber made the first glider crossing of the Simplon in it on 6 August 1937. On 18–19 June 1942, the French glider pioneer Erich Nessler set a new world duration record of 38 h 21 min in a S.18 III.

Even in the 1960s, S.18s competed in national contests in Switzerland, South Africa and Argentina. One of the longest flights in Switzerland was made by Rudolf Seilor in a S.18 II, covering 396 km (246 mi) between Altenrhein and Grenoble on May 18 1958.

In June 2019 the Swiss aircraft register showed one S.18 II and three S.18 IIIs registered; another six S.18 Is, eleven S.18 IIs and thirteen S.18 IIIs were listed as de-registered. In all, fifty-seven S.18s were built in serial production at AG Wynau.

One S.18 II and three further S.18 III airframes were in museums and collections in France, Germany and Switzerland in 2010, though not on public display.

== Variants ==
S.18 I
13.3 m (43 ft 8 in) span gull-wing. First flown 24 May 1936. At least six built.
S.18 II
Longer, 14.3 m (46 ft 11 in) span gull-wing. First flown 13 June 1937. About twenty-five built.
S.18 T Chouca
As S.18 II but with positive dihedral on outer panels for aerobatics. One built.
S.18 K
Short span 11.7 m (38 ft 5 in) gull-wing, aerobatic version. First flown in late summer 1939. One built.
S.18 III
14.3 m (46 ft 11 in) span gull-wing with airbrakes and a refined cockpit profile. At least sixteen built.
S.18 A
Postwar higher speed, shorter span (13.8 m (45 ft 3 in)) aerobatic and cloud flying version. Constant-dihedral wing.

== Specifications (S.18 II) ==
Data from Simons, M (2006)

General characteristics

- Crew: One
- Length: 6.25 m (20 ft 6 in)
- Wingspan: 14.30 m (46 ft 11 in)
- Wing area: 14.25 m^{2} (153.4 sq ft)
- Aspect ratio: 14.35
- Airfoil: Göttingen Gö 535
- Empty weight: 135 kg (298 lb)
- Gross weight: 215 kg (474 lb)
