= Slingsby T.53 =

British two-seat glider, 1967

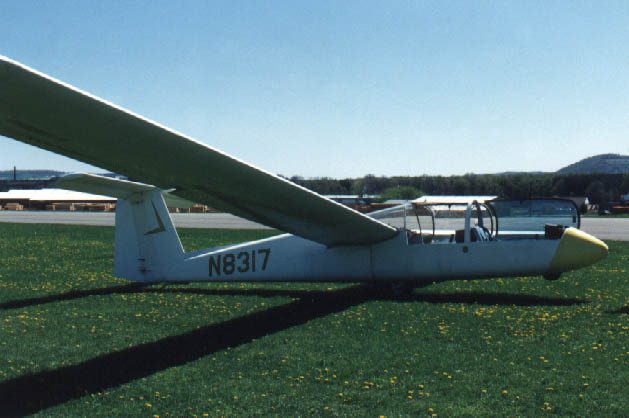

General information
- Type: Sport Glider
- National origin: United Kingdom
- Manufacturer: Slingsby Sailplanes
- Designer: John Sellars
- Primary user: Royal Air Force
- Number built: 21

History
- First flight: 9 March 1967

The Slingsby T.53 was the first all-metal sailplane designed and built in the United Kingdom. It was designed and built by Slingsby Sailplanes for evaluation by the Royal Air Force.

== Design and development ==
In the early 1960s the RAF issued a requirement to replace the current wooden gliders used by the Air Training Corps with a new tandem two-seater. Slingsby took the opportunity to design a new glider that would meet the needs of the ATC and could be used by civil gliding clubs. Slingsby decided to make the glider in metal, which would make it more marketable in areas like the United States and Australia where the traditional wooden gliders did not sell well. The glider would also be lighter and the labour costs would be less, although the cost of tooling would be higher. To gain experience the company purchased a kit of the Schweizer 2-22, which was then constructed to learn the techniques applicable to metal gliders.

The construction of the prototype was started in June 1966, with the first flight on 9 March 1967 at Wombleton. The T.53 is constructed using a conventional light alloy flush-riveted design. To ensure the rear occupant is forward of the wing leading edge, the shoulder-mounted wing is swept forwards by 5 degrees. It has a high-mounted stabiliser.

The Royal Air Force ordered 40 gliders, and the second T.53 was evaluated by them for use by the Air Training Corps. The order was cancelled following evaluation and the disruption caused when the Slingsby factory was destroyed by fire in November 1968. Following the fire, Slingsby built a small batch of modified T.53B aircraft, the Phoenix, for the civil market, and later sold the rights of the design to Yorkshire Sailplanes which then resumed production as the Yorkshire Sailplanes YS-53 Sovereign.

== Variants ==
T.52
A preliminary design study of an all-metal two-seater, superseded by the T.53.
T.53A
prototype with flaps on wings, one built.
T.53B
updated with two fixed tandem wheels and a swept-forward flapless wing of constant chord, 20 built.
T.53C
Production variant for the RAF, not built.
Yorkshire Sailplanes YS-53 Sovereign
Production resumed after Yorkshire Sailplanes acquired the rights to the T.53 Phoenix.

== Specification (T.53B) ==
Data from

General characteristics

- Crew: 2
- Length: 25 ft 0 in (7.62 m)
- Wingspan: 55 ft 6 in (17.0 m)
- Wing area: 194 sq ft (18.02 m^{2})
- Aspect ratio: 15.9
- Empty weight: 780 lb (354 kg)
- Gross weight: 1,279 lb (580 kg)

Performance

- Maximum speed: 142 mph (228 km/h, 123 kn)
- Lift-to-drag: 30
- Wing loading: 6.59 lb/sq ft (32.19 kg/m^{2})

== See also ==
Related lists

- List of gliders
- List of aircraft of the Royal Air Force
