= Schleicher ASK 23 =

German single-seat glider, 1983

ASK 23
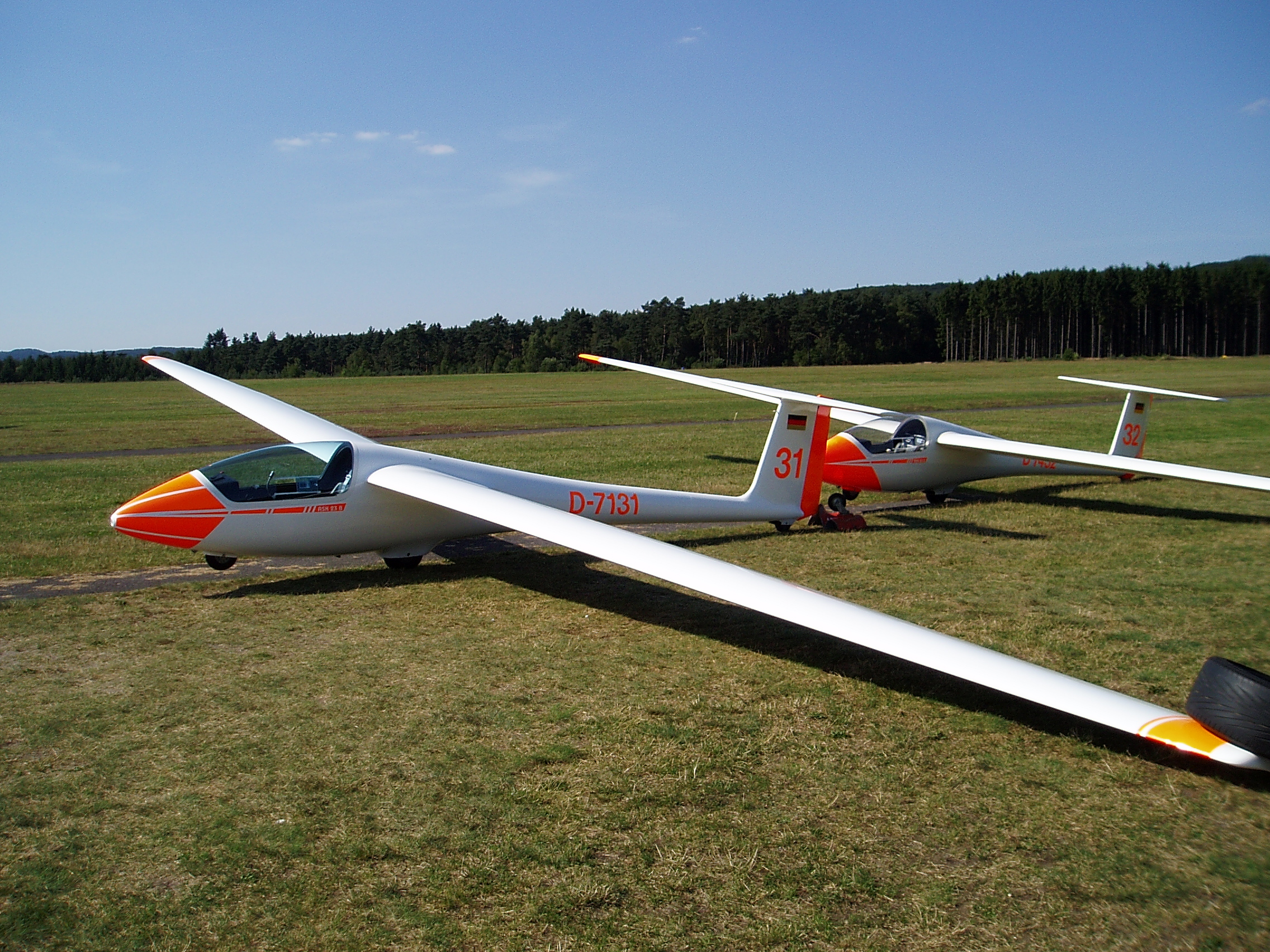

General information
- Type: Club class sailplane
- National origin: Germany
- Manufacturer: Schleicher
- Designer: Rudolf Kaiser
- Number built: 153

History
- First flight: October 1983

The Schleicher ASK 23 is a single-seat Club Class sailplane that was built by the German manufacturer Alexander Schleicher GmbH & Co.

== Design ==
The ASK 23 was the last glider to be designed by Rudolf Kaiser. It is an early-solo sailplane with docile handling, and was a successor to the Schleicher Ka 8 and ASK 18. It is also the single-seat counterpart of the two-seat Schleicher ASK 21 with a similar cockpit layout. It uses glass-fibre reinforced plastic and 'honeycomb' as its main construction materials. It has no flaps, a nose wheel and a fixed main-wheel with a tail-skid or optional tail-wheel.

First flown in October 1983, the initial version allowed for heavy pilots, with a maximum cockpit weight of 140 kg (310 lb), reduced to 120 kg (260 lb) in the later ASK23B version. 51 gliders of the original version were built, and 102 of the 'B' version.

== Specifications (ASK 23) ==
Data from Jane's All the World's Aircraft 1988–89

General characteristics

- Crew: 1
- Length: 7.1 m (23 ft 4 in)
- Wingspan: 15 m (49 ft 3 in)
- Height: 1.4 m (4 ft 7 in)
- Wing area: 12.9 m^{2} (139 sq ft)
- Aspect ratio: 17.4
- Airfoil: root:Wortmann FX-61-168, tip:Wortmann FX-60-126
- Empty weight: 230 kg (507 lb)
- Max takeoff weight: 380 kg (838 lb)

Performance

- Stall speed: 60 km/h (37 mph, 32 kn)
- Never exceed speed: 220 km/h (140 mph, 120 kn) in smooth air

148 km/h (80 kn; 92 mph) in rough air
148 km/h (80 kn; 92 mph) on aero-tow
125 km/h (67 kn; 78 mph) on winch launch

- g limits: +5.3 – 2.65
- Maximum glide ratio: 34 at 80 km/h (43 kn; 50 mph)
- Rate of sink: 0.62 m/s (122 ft/min) at 74 km/h (40 kn; 46 mph)
- Wing loading: 29.5 kg/m^{2} (6.0 lb/sq ft)

== See also ==
Aircraft of comparable role, configuration, and era

- Glasflügel 205 Club Libelle
- Grob G102 Astir
- SZD-51 Junior

Related lists

- List of gliders
