= Alexander Schleicher GmbH & Co =

German sailplane manufacturer, founded 1927

- Trade name: Alexander Schleicher
- Company type: Private
- Industry: Aircraft manufacturing
- Founded: 1927
- Founder: Alexander Schleicher
- Headquarters: Poppenhausen, near Fulda, Germany
- Area served: Worldwide
- Key people: Peter Kremer (CEO); Ulrich Kremer (CEO)
- Products: Gliders (sailplanes)
- Production output: 70 to 80 aircraft per year (2019)
- Number of employees: 120
- Website: alexander-schleicher.de

Alexander Schleicher GmbH & Co is a major manufacturer of sailplanes located in Poppenhausen, near Fulda in Germany.

It is also the oldest sailplane manufacturer in the world.

== History ==
The company was founded in 1927 by Alexander Schleicher using money that he had won as a pilot in a gliding competition. It grew quickly in size and fame, producing many notable designs including the Anfänger ("Beginner"), Zögling ("Student"), Professor, Mannheim, and the Stadt Frankfurt (City of Frankfurt).

Meanwhile, the aircraft produced under contract by the company continued to grow in size and complexity, reaching their pinnacle with the DFS Rhönadler (Rhön eagle) and DFS Rhönbussard (Rhön buzzard) designed by Hans Jacobs, and a huge, three-seat experimental glider built from a design by Alexander Lippisch for the Deutsche Forschungsanstalt für Segelflug (DFS - German Research Institute for Sailplane Flight).

=== Production during WW2 ===
By the time war broke out in Europe in 1939, Schleicher was already employing hundreds of workers in what was a major enterprise.

During World War II, the factory was used to maintain and repair training gliders for the Hitler Youth, who received flight training at the Wasserkuppe.

At the end of the war in 1945, aviation activities were suspended in allied-occupied Germany, and Alexander Schleicher returned to his roots, using his factory to build furniture until the restrictions were lifted in 1951, and the company could build sailplanes once more.

=== In the 21st century ===
The company is managed by Alexander's grandsons, Peter Kremer, and Ulrich Kremer.

== Gliders ==
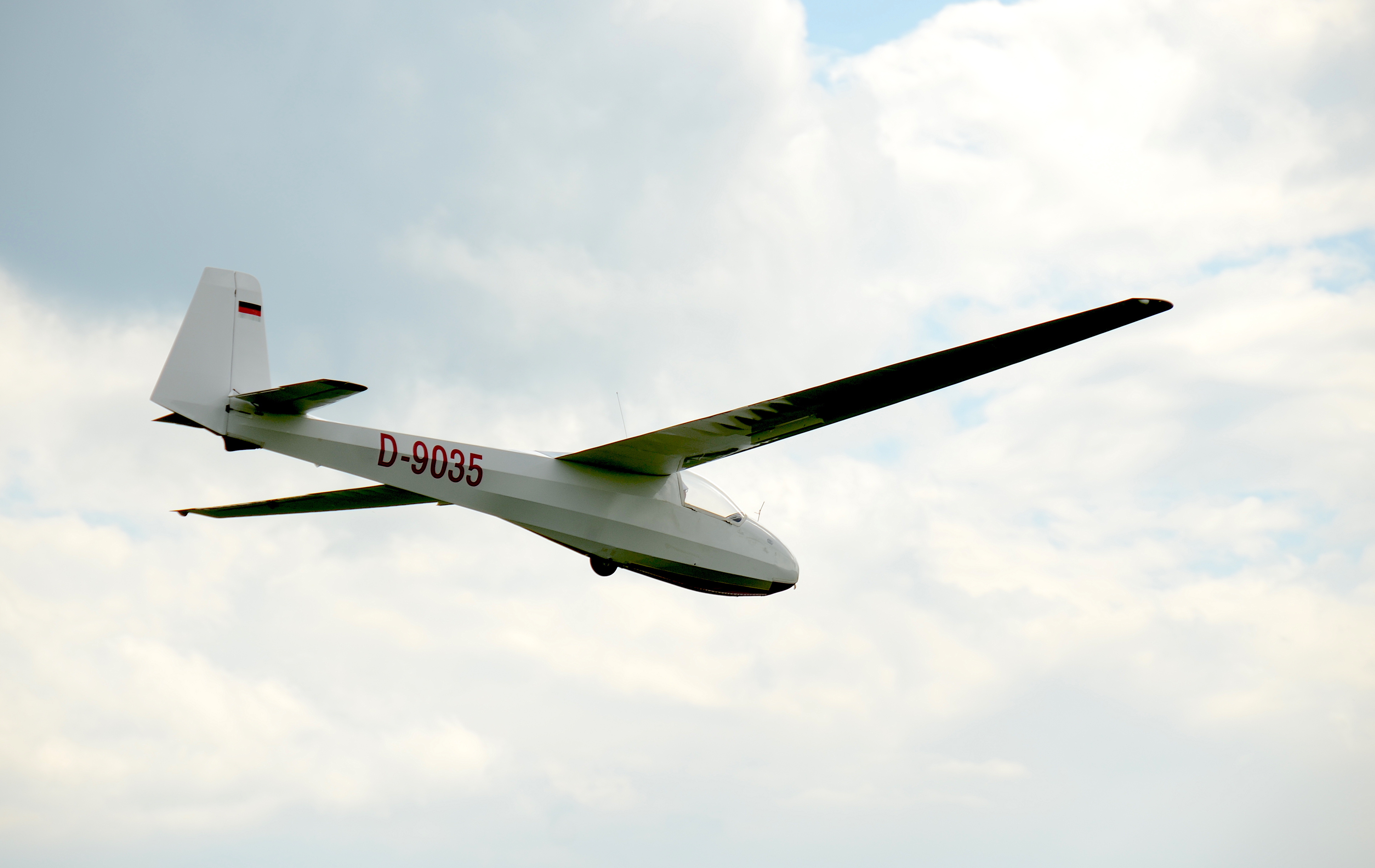
Schleicher K 8 D-9035

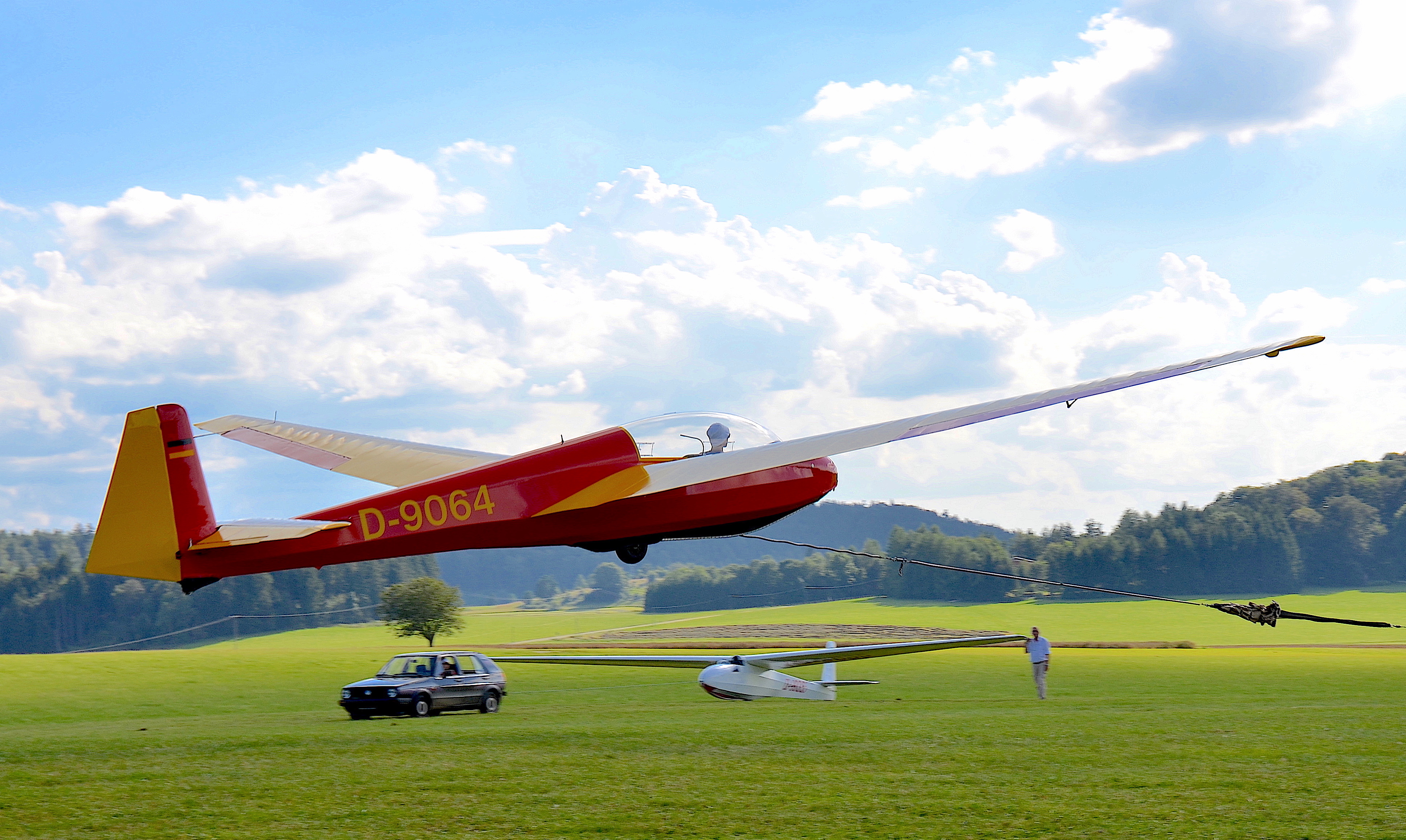
ASK 13 being winch launched

The first notable post-war designs were made by Rudolf Kaiser and include:

- Ka 1 (Single-seat trainer)
- Ka 2 (Two-seat trainer)
- Ka 3 (Single-seat trainer)
- Ka 4 (Two-seat trainer)
- Ka 6 (Standard Class)
- K 7 (Two-seat trainer)
- K 8 (Standard Class)
- K 10 (Standard Class)
- ASK 13 (Two-seat trainer)
- ASK 14 (Single-seat touring motor glider)
- ASK 16 (Two-seat touring motor glider)
- ASK 18 (Club Class)
- ASK 21 (Glass fibre two-seat trainer)
- ASK 23 (Glass fibre Club Class)

The modern era of using composite materials such as fiberglass and carbon fiber began with single-seat gliders designed by Gerhard Waibel. His designs are:

- ASW 12 (Open Class)
- ASW 15 (Standard Class)
- ASW 17 (Open Class)
- ASW 19 (Standard Class)
- ASW 20 (15 metre Class, some with tip extensions)
- ASW 22 (Open Class)
- ASW 24 (Standard Class)
- ASW 27 (15 metre Class)
- ASW 28 (Standard Class, but some also with tips for 18 metres)

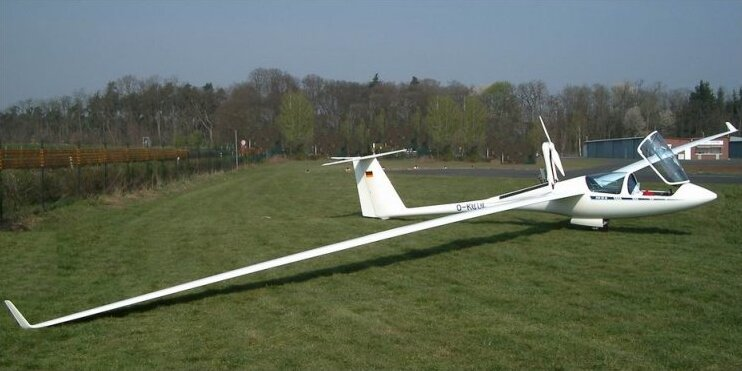
A Schleicher ASH 25.

Designers Martin Heide and Michael Greiner have produced:

- ASH 25 (Two-seat Open Class)
- ASH 26 (18 metre Class, often motorised)
- ASG 29 (15 metre Class and 18 metre Class)
- ASH 30 Mi (Two-seat Open Class, motorised, replacing ASH 25)
- ASH 31 (Open class and 18 metre class, replacing ASH 26)
- ASG 32 (Two-Seater Class)

Following the retirement of Martin Heide, successive aircraft were designed by a team that includes Joschka Schmeisl, Paul Anklam, Andreas Storch, Ulrich Simon, Tobias Mörsel and Manfred Munch:

- AS 33 (15/18 metre Class, ASG 29 successor)
- AS 34 Me (15/18 metre Class, self launching electric)
- AS 35 Mi (18/Open Class, self launching, replacing ASH31)
