= Schleicher ASK 18 =

German glider, 1974

ASK 18
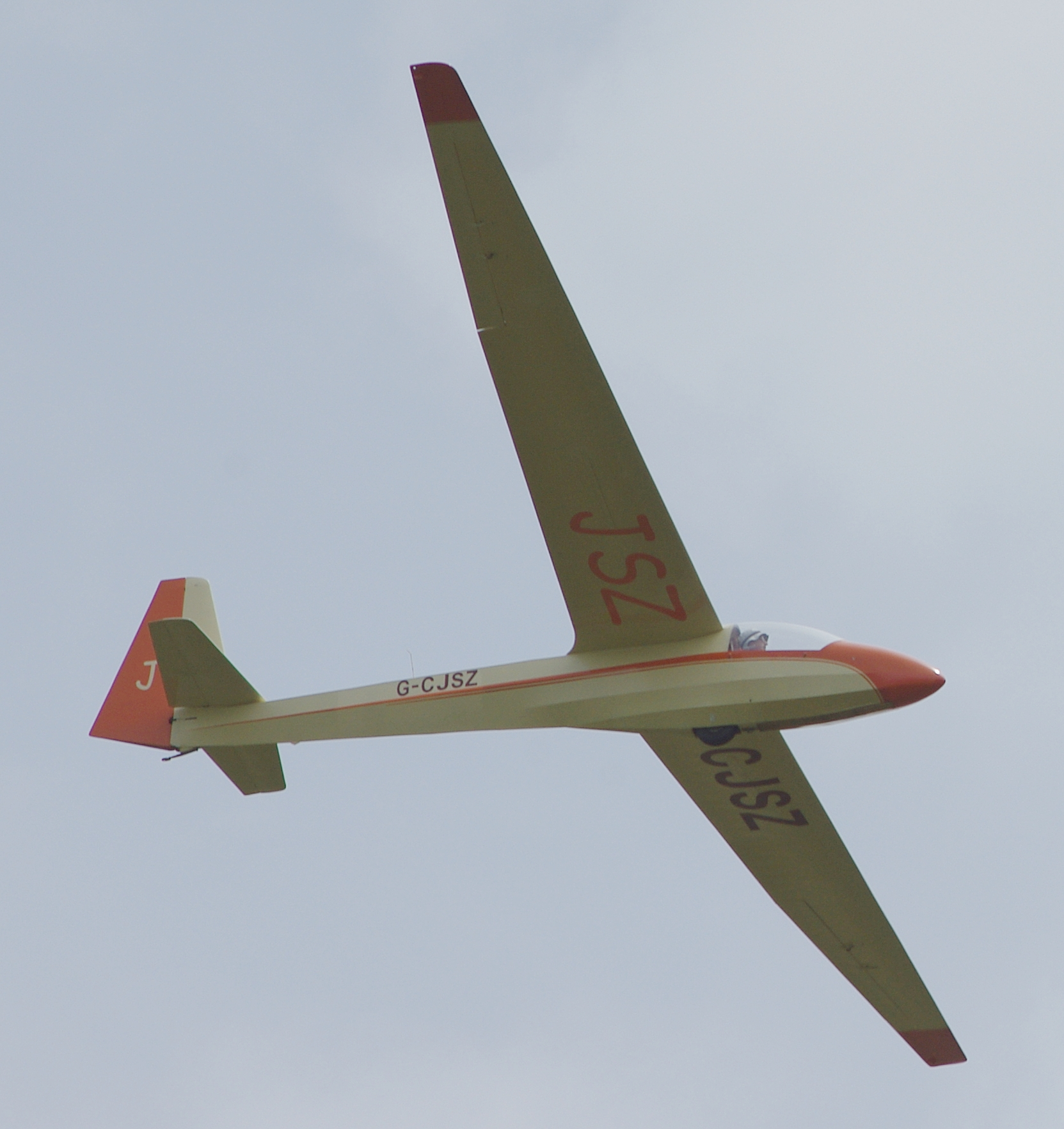
- ASK18 at Camphill, Derbyshire 2011

General information
- Type: Club class sailplane
- National origin: Germany
- Manufacturer: Schleicher
- Designer: Rudolf Kaiser
- Number built: 56

History
- First flight: October 1974
- Developed from: Schleicher K 8

The Schleicher ASK 18 is a single-seat sailplane that was built by the German manufacturer Alexander Schleicher GmbH & Co. It was designed to be a sturdy aircraft for inexperienced solo pilots and so uses a simple and rugged construction and has docile handling characteristics.

== Design ==
The ASK 18 was designed by Rudolf Kaiser and was the last Schleicher glider to use the traditional construction method, at a time when contemporary aircraft of the same class, such as the Grob G102 Astir, were made of glass-fibre. The fuselage was derived from the Ka 8 and used welded steel tube and spruce longerons. It is covered in fabric. The wings are from the Ka 6E but with 16-metre span. They have a single wooden spar. The rear part of the wing is fabric-covered and the ailerons are plywood-covered. The tailplane came from the K 10; the fin and tailplane are plywood-covered and the rudder and elevators are fabric covered. A Flettner trim tab is fitted to the elevator. Only the nose cone is glass-fibre. The main-wheel is fixed and has a brake. There is a tail-skid but no nose-skid. The Schempp-Hirth airbrakes extend above and below the wing. First flight was in October 1974.

A variation was the ASK 18B which had a span reduced to 15m. At the end of production in 1977 38 K18s and 9 K18Bs had been built by Schleicher and one unknown variant built from a kit. A further 8 K18-ARs were produced in Argentina.

== Specifications ==
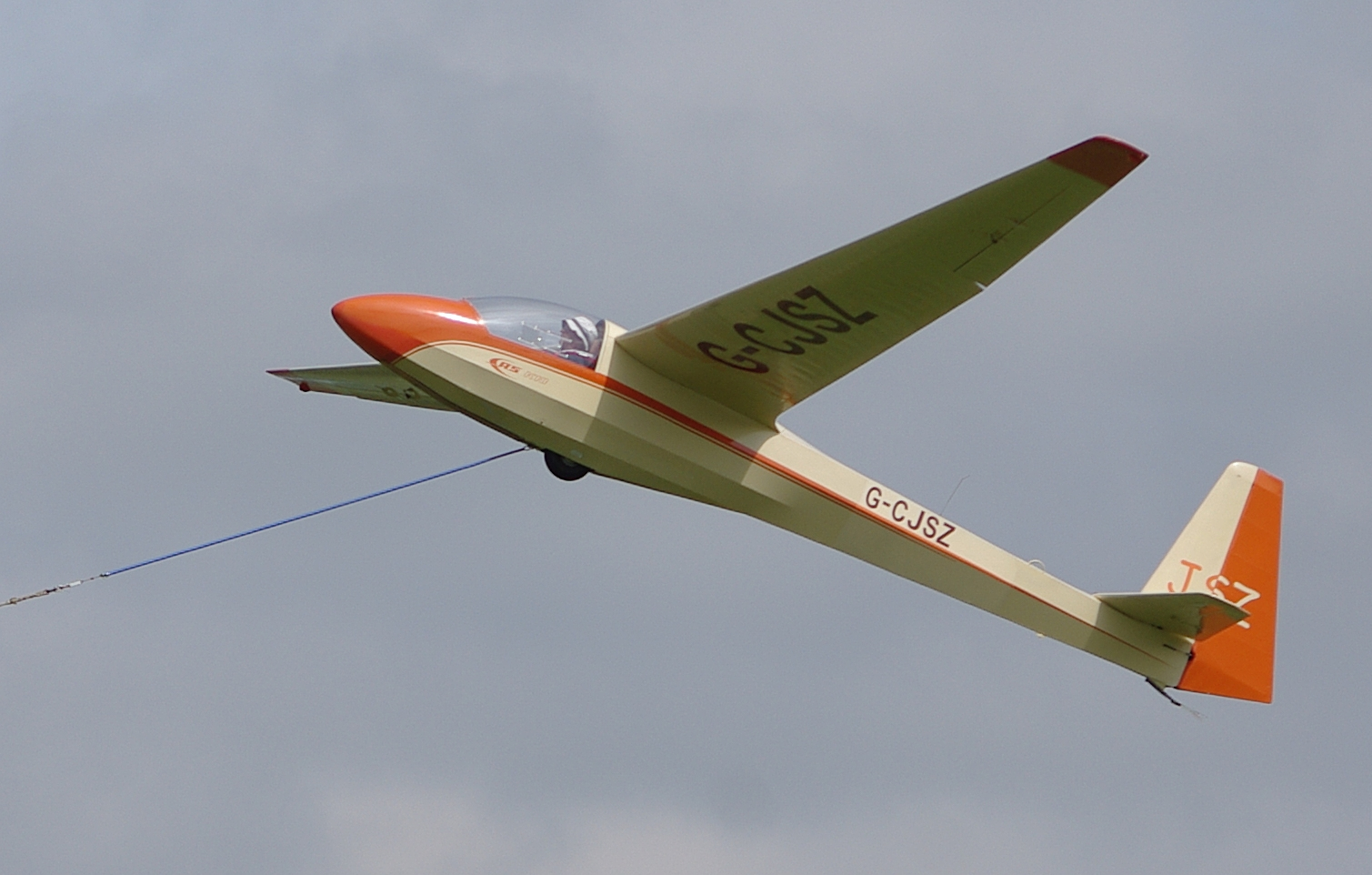
ASK 18 launching at Camphill

General characteristics

- Crew: One
- Length: 7.00 m (22 ft 11.59 in)
- Wingspan: 16.00 m (52 ft 6 in)
- Height: 1.68 m (5 ft 6 in)
- Wing area: 13.0 m^{2} (140 sq ft)
- Aspect ratio: 19.7
- Airfoil: Root: NACA 633-618 Mid: NACA 633-614 (with Wortmann leading edge modification)
- Empty weight: 215 kg (473 lb)
- Gross weight: 335 kg (737 lb)

Performance

- Maximum speed: 200 km/h (125 mph, 109 kn)
- Maximum glide ratio: 34
- Rate of sink: 0.62 m/s (122 ft/min)

== See also ==
Related lists

- List of gliders
