= Schleicher ASK 14 =

German single-seat motor glider by Alexander Schleicher in Germany, 1967

ASK 14
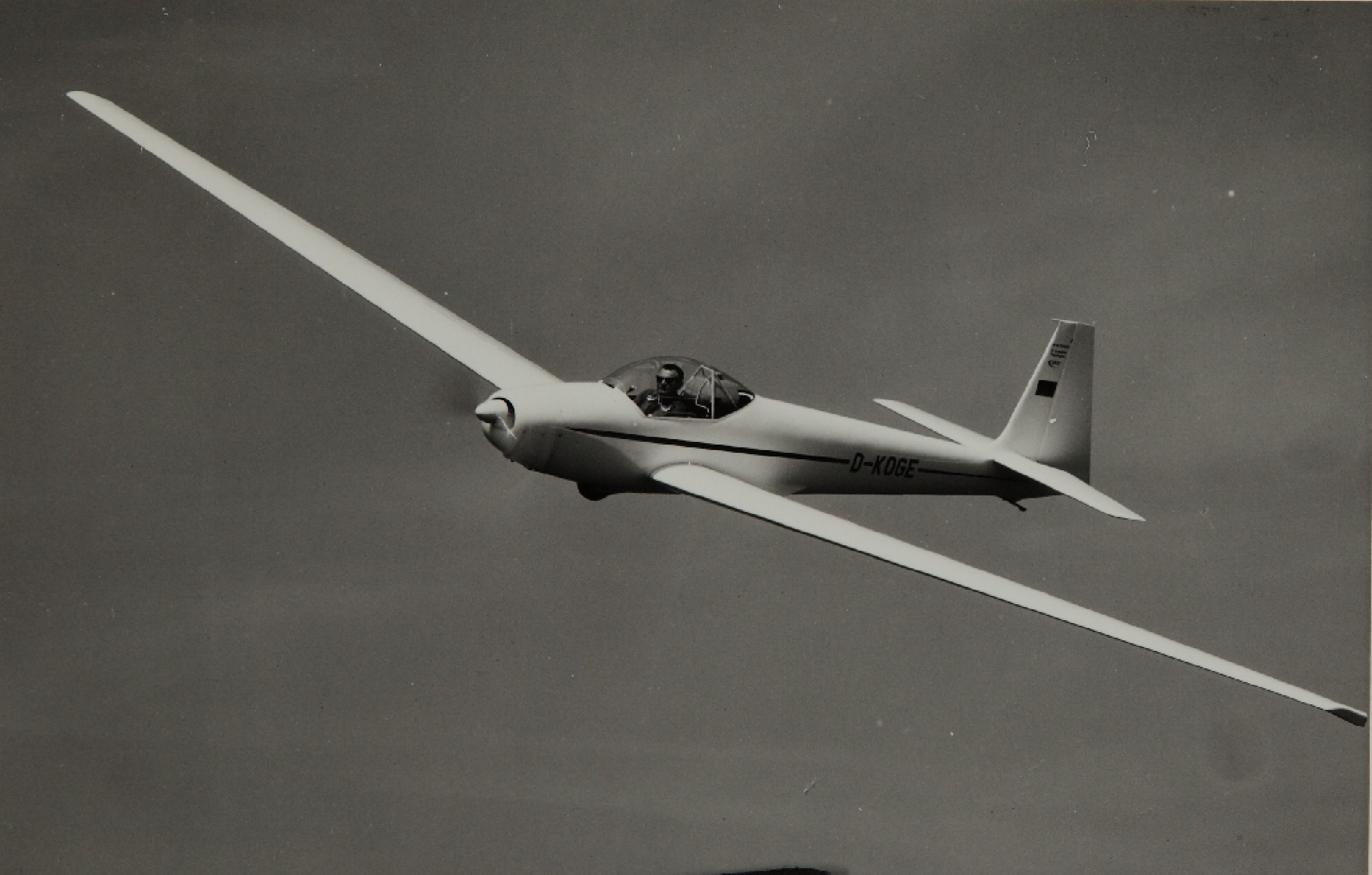

General information
- Type: Motor glider
- Manufacturer: Alexander Schleicher GmbH & Co
- Designer: Rudolf Kaiser
- Number built: 66

History
- Developed from: Schleicher Ka 6E

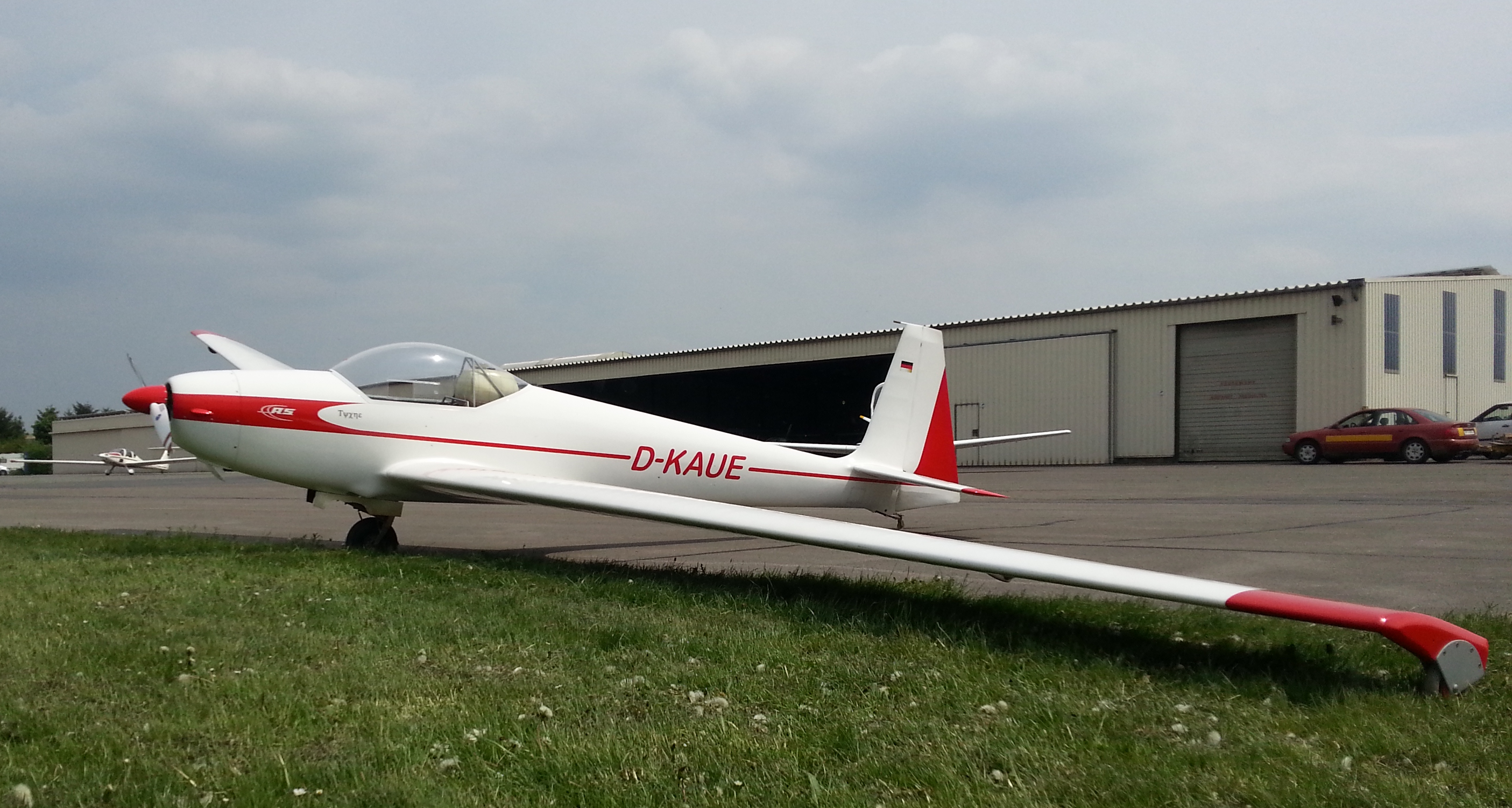
ASK 14 at Wallduern Airfield/Germany

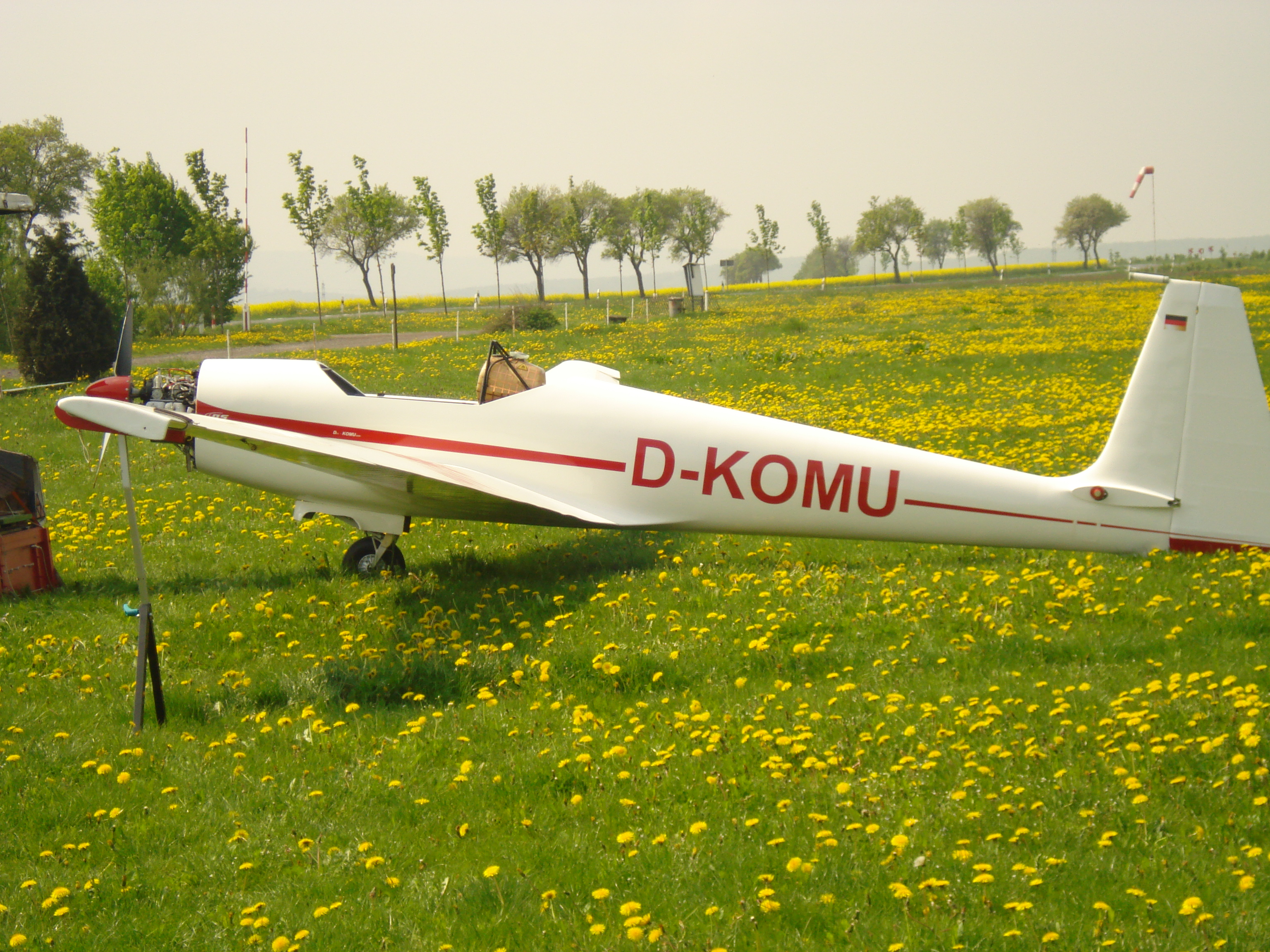
ASK 14 partially disassembled for maintenance

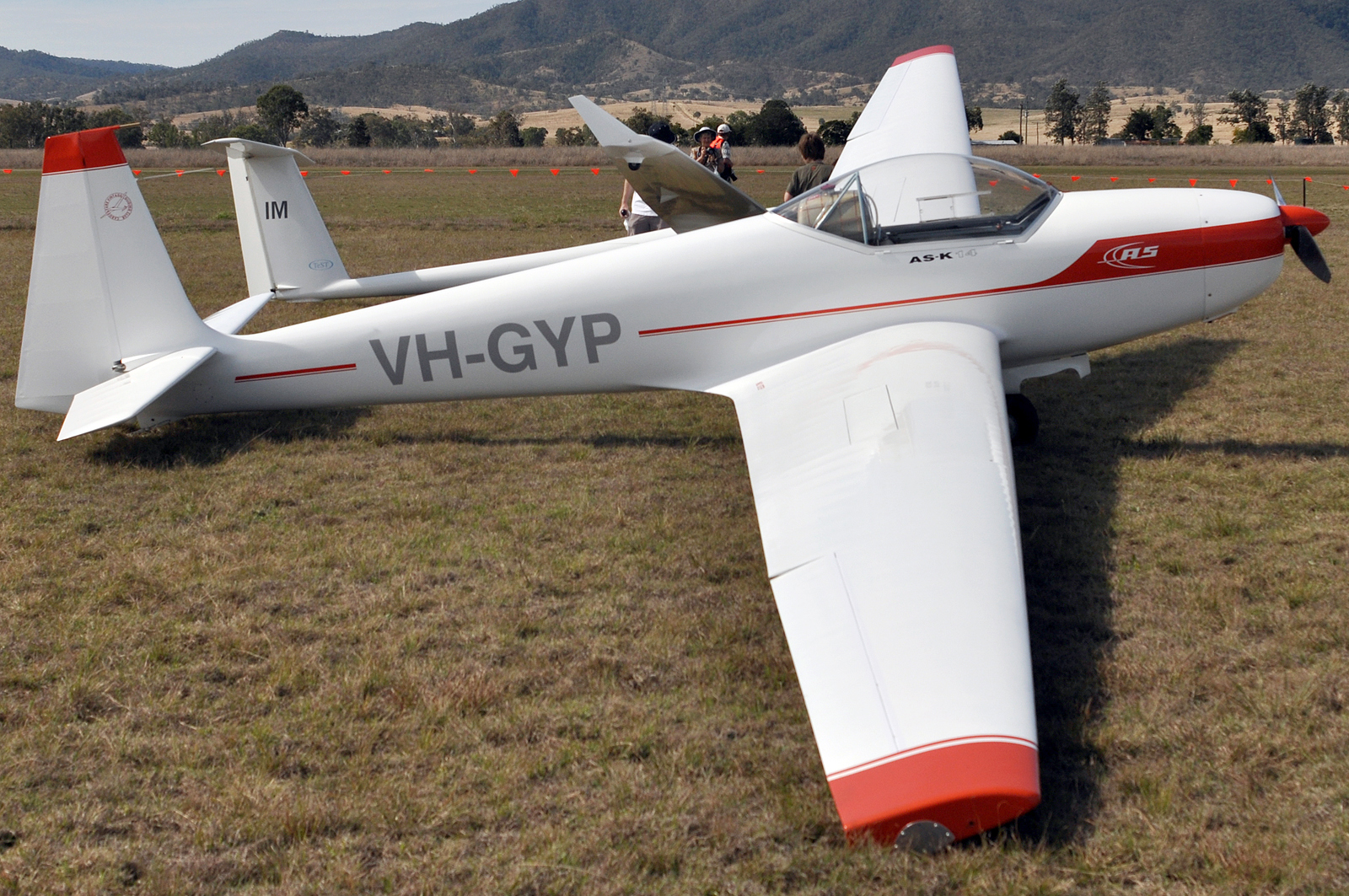
ASK 14 in Australia

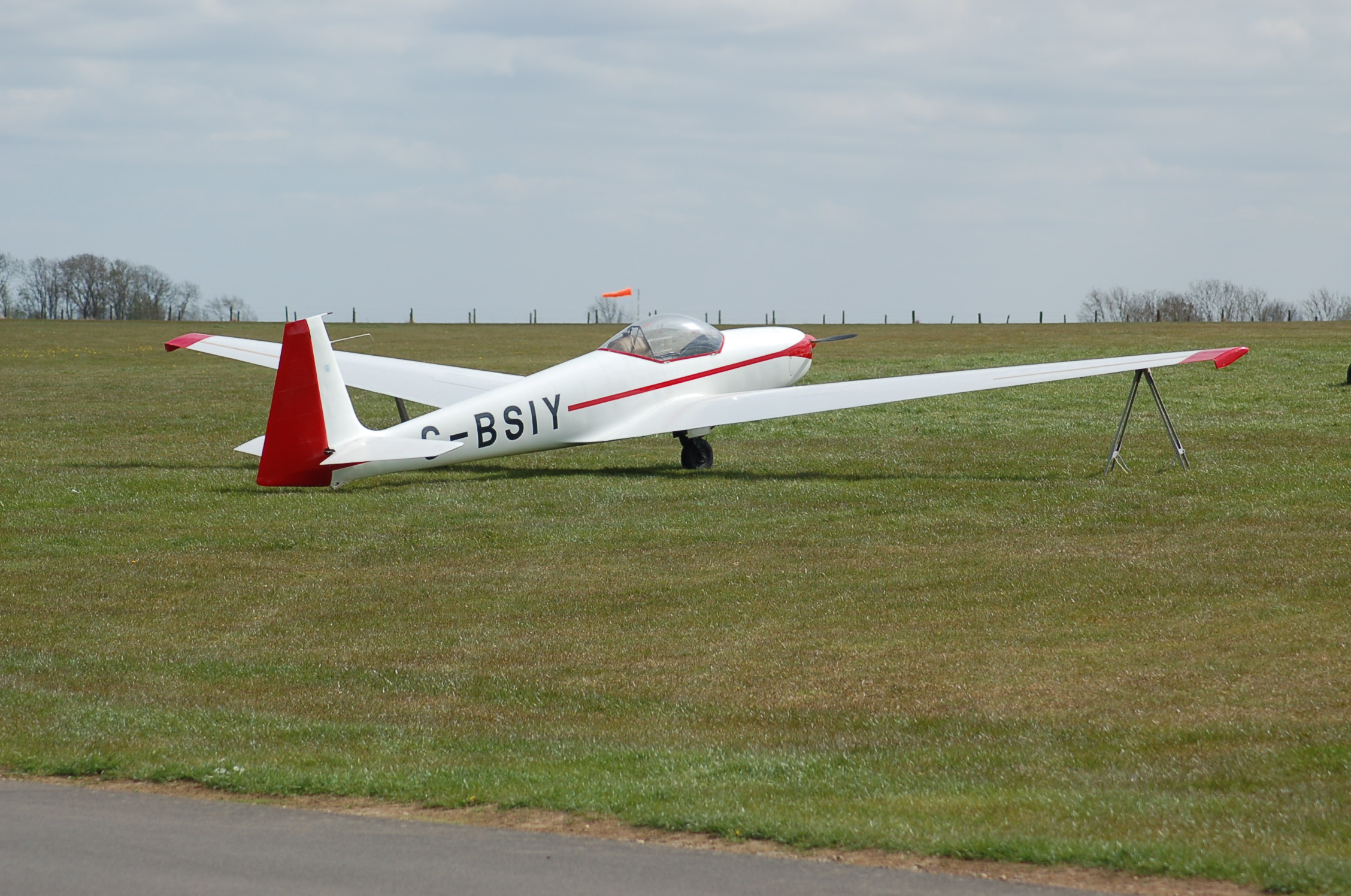
British ASK 14

The Schleicher ASK 14 is a West German low-wing, single-seat motor glider that was designed by Rudolf Kaiser and produced by Alexander Schleicher GmbH & Co.

The aircraft is often referred to as the Schleicher AS-K 14 or the Schleicher ASK-14, the AS for Alexander Schleicher and the K for Kaiser. The US Federal Aviation Administration designates the aircraft as the Schleicher ASK-14, while Transport Canada and the United Kingdom Civil Aviation Authority call it the Schleicher ASK 14.

== Design and development ==
The ASK 14 was developed as a low-wing motorized version of the Schleicher Ka 6E. The powerplant is a 19 kW (25 hp) Hirth F10 K19 four-cylinder, two-stroke engine, made by Hirth and driving a fully feathering propeller.

The aircraft is built from wood and covered with doped aircraft fabric covering. The 14.4 m (47.2 ft) span wing employs a NACA 63-618 airfoil at the wing root transitioning to a NACA 63-615 section at the wing tip and features spoilers. The monowheel landing gear is retractable. The cockpit is covered by a bubble canopy that gives all-around visibility.

Due to its Ka 6E heritage the handling of the ASK 14 was described by Soaring Magazine in 1983 as "superb".

The ASK 14 was never type certified and aircraft registered in the United States were in the Experimental - Racing/Exhibition category. ASK 14s in Canada are in the category CAR Standard 507.03(5)(a) Aircraft Held a Flight Permit - Private Aircraft prior 01/89. Those in the UK have an EASA Certificate of Airworthiness.

== Operational history ==
ASK 14s finished second, third and fourth in the single-place class at the first international motorglider competition, that was held at Burg Feuerstein, West Germany in 1970.

In 1971 former Soaring Magazine editor Bennett Rogers set the first United States motorgliding record in an ASK 14, flying 330.5 km (205 mi) out-and-return from Rosamond, California, US.

In July 2011 there were still eight ASK 14s registered with the FAA in the US, two with the UK Civil Aviation Authority and one registered with Transport Canada.

== Specifications (ASK 14) ==
Data from Sailplane Directory and Soaring

General characteristics

- Crew: one
- Wingspan: 14.4 m (47 ft 3 in)
- Wing area: 12.68 m^{2} (136.5 sq ft)
- Aspect ratio: 16.8:1
- Airfoil: root: NACA 63-618, tip: NACA 63-615
- Empty weight: 245 kg (540 lb)
- Gross weight: 360 kg (794 lb)
- Powerplant: 1 × Hirth F10 K19 four cylinder, two-stroke, 19 kW (25 hp)
- Propellers: 2-bladed fully feathering

Performance

- Maximum glide ratio: 29:1 at 81 km/h (50 mph)
- Rate of sink: 0.75 m/s (148 ft/min) at 72 km/h (45 mph)
- Wing loading: 28.6 kg/m^{2} (5.9 lb/sq ft)

== See also ==
- List of gliders

Aircraft of comparable role, configuration, and era

- Akaflieg München Mü23 Saurier
