= Schleicher Ka 2 Rhönschwalbe =

German two-seat glider, 1953

Ka2 Rhönschwalbe
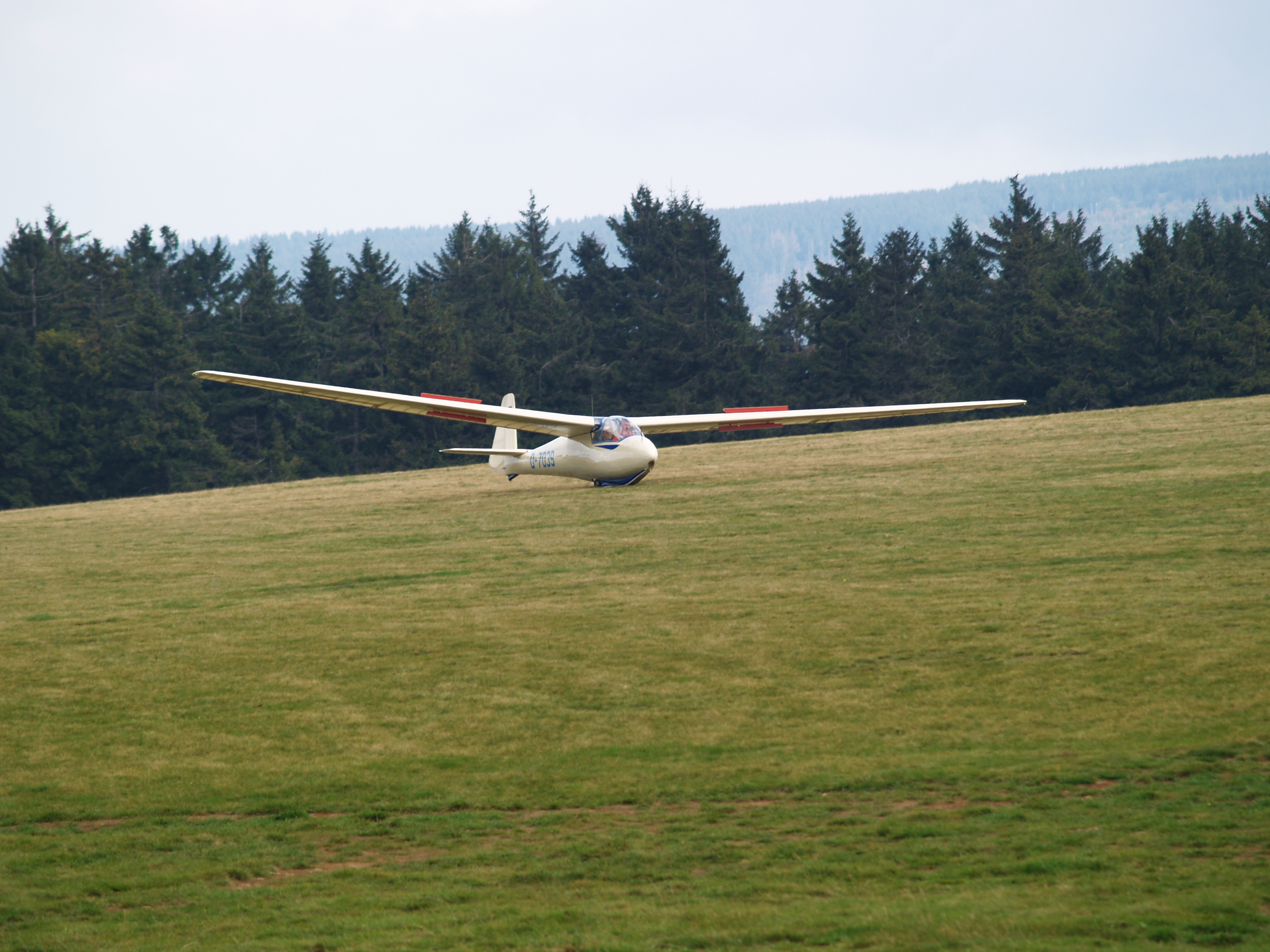
- A Ka–2 on landing

General information
- Type: two-seat training glider
- National origin: Germany
- Manufacturer: Alexander Schleicher GmbH & Co
- Designer: Rudolf Kaiser
- Number built: Ka–2 42 built, Ka–2b 75 built

History
- Manufactured: 1953 - 1957
- First flight: Spring 1953

The Schleicher Ka-2 Rhönschwalbe is a tandem two-seat training glider designed and built in Germany, in 1952.

== Design and development ==
Designed by Rudolf Kaiser, the Ka-2 was an all wooden glider with plywood and aircraft fabric covering. The Ka-2s wings, with marked forward sweep and dihedral are mounted above the fuselage, flanking the rear cockpit. The front cockpit is covered by a one piece plexiglas canopy which opens to the right and the rear cockpit is covered by a canopy incorporating the inner leading edges of the wing, opening rear-wards, held in place by the front canopy when closed.

The undercarriage of the Ka-2 comprises a large rubber-sprung wooden skid under the forward fuselage in front of a non-retractable semi recessed mainwheel, as well as a steel rubber-sprung tail-skid. Conventional controls are fitted with ailerons on each wingtip trailing edge, elevator with anti-balance trim tab behind the tailplane and rudder aft of the fin. Schempp-Hirth airbrakes, at 38% chord and approx ⅓ span, open out above and below the wing to provide approach control.

Performance of the Ka-2 was found to be lower than expected, due to the relatively high wing loading. Schleicher introduced the Ka2b, increasing the wingspan from 15 m (49 ft) to 16 m (52 ft), to improve the efficiency of the wing. Fuselage length was also increased by 18 cm (7.1 in) to 8.15 m (26.7 ft) to maintain stability margins in pitch.

Performance of the Ka-2b was improved in weak thermals due to a lower minimum sink speed, allowing tighter thermalling. Cross-country performance was also improved by a higher glide ratio, increasing the chance of reaching the next thermal. The standard competition handicap for the Ka–2 is 74 and the Ka-2b handicap is 78.

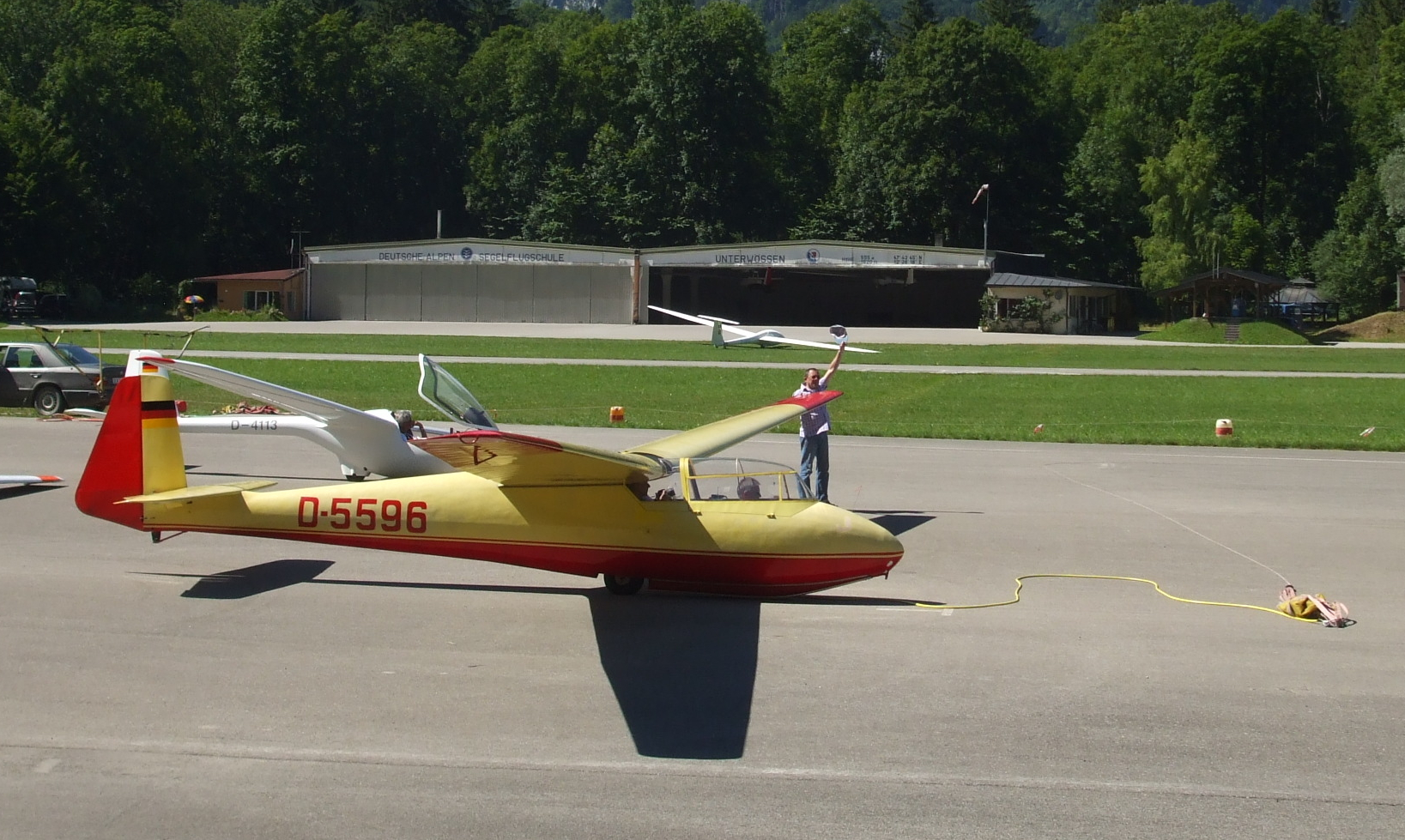
Ka 2b (D-5596) waiting for a winch launch

== Operational history ==
The Ka-2 and Ka-2b saw extensive use in gliding clubs throughout Germany and Europe and the Ka2b was also used in several record attempts; On 24 January 1959 Dieter Schmitt and Karl Pummer climbed a Ka-2b 6,907 m (22,661 ft) in lee wave lift at Fayence in France for a new German National two-seater record climb. Later the same day flying to 7,700 m (25,300 ft) to set a new German two-seater absolute altitude record.

A Ka2b also set a distance record for two seaters in Germany of 424.5 km (263.8 mi; 229.2 nmi) in 1964 and again on 28 May 2012 at 684 km (425 mi; 369 nmi), flown by Uli Schwenk and his 81-year-old father.

== Variants ==
Ka-2
The initial production glider with a 15 m (49 ft) span wing and 7.97 m (26.1 ft) long fuselage.
Ka-2b
An improved performance version with 16 m (52 ft) span wings and 8.15 m (26.7 ft) fuselage.

== Specifications (Ka-2) ==
Data from Sailplanes 1945-1965, and The World's Sailplanes:Die Segelflugzeuge der Welt:Les Planeurs du Monde

General characteristics

- Crew: 2
- Length: 7.97 m (26 ft 2 in)
- Wingspan: 15 m (49 ft 3 in)
- Height: 1.7 m (5 ft 7 in)
- Wing area: 16.8 m^{2} (181 sq ft)
- Aspect ratio: 13.4
- Airfoil: Wing root: Göttingen 533 modified 16%, Mid span: Göttingen 533 14%, Wing tip: Göttingen 533 12%
- Empty weight: 254 kg (560 lb)
- Gross weight: 460 kg (1,014 lb)

Performance

- Stall speed: 58.5 km/h (36.4 mph, 31.6 kn)
- Never exceed speed: 170 km/h (110 mph, 92 kn) in smooth air
- Rough air speed max: 130 km/h (81 mph; 70 kn)
- Aerotow speed: 130 km/h (81 mph; 70 kn)
- Winch launch speed: 100 km/h (62 mph; 54 kn)
- g limits: +4g at 126 km/h (78 mph; 68 kn), -2g at 168 km/h (104 mph; 91 kn)
- Rate of sink: 0.9 m/s (180 ft/min) at 65 km/h (40 mph; 35 kn) at 415 kg (915 lb)
- Lift-to-drag: 26:1 at 80 km/h (50 mph; 43 kn) at 415 kg (915 lb)
- Wing loading: 27.4 kg/m^{2} (5.6 lb/sq ft) at 460 kg (1,010 lb)

== See also ==
Related development

- Schleicher Ka7

Related lists

- List of gliders
