= Schleicher K 8 =

German single seat training glider, 1957

K 8
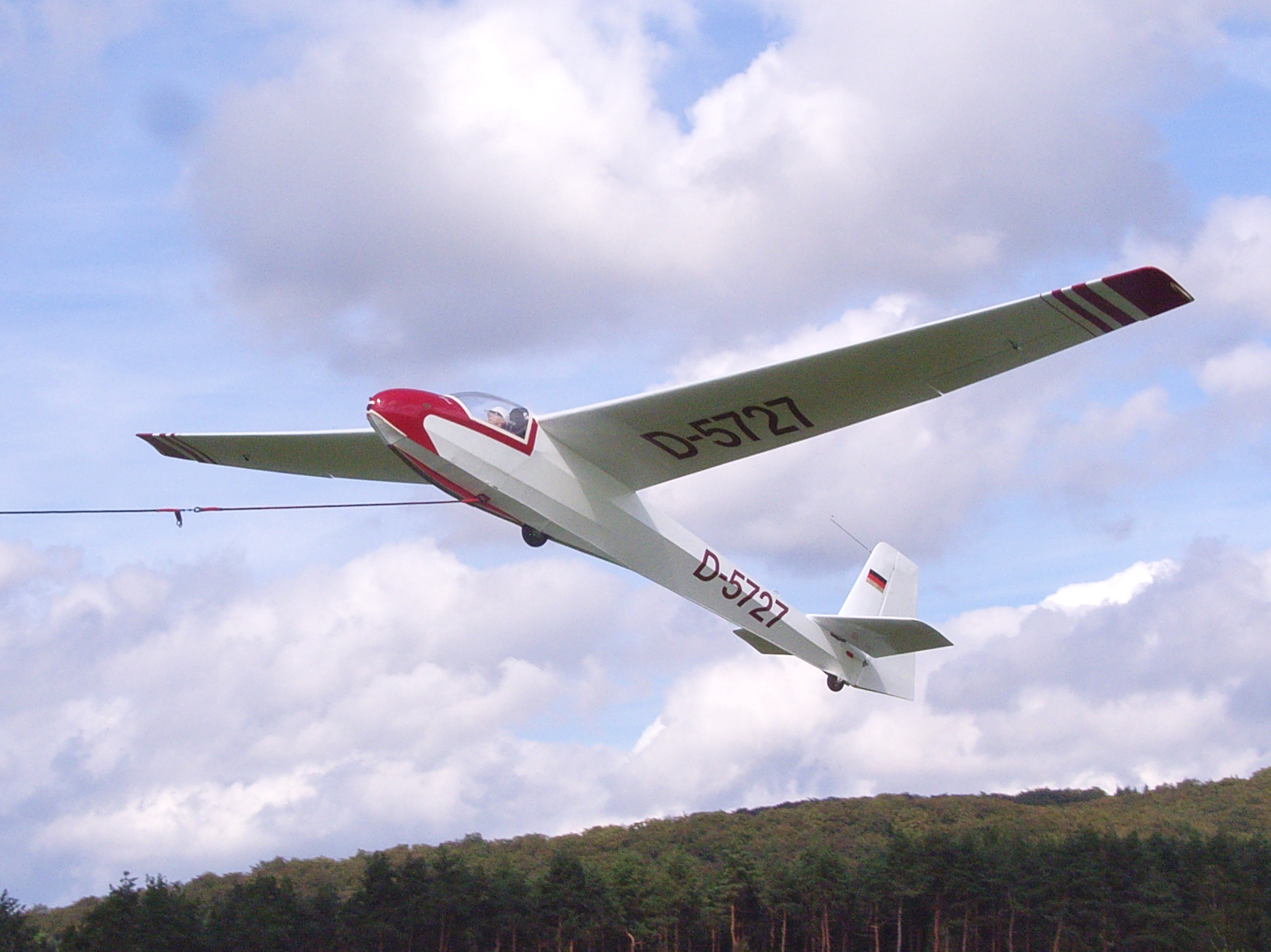

General information
- Type: Sailplane
- National origin: Germany
- Manufacturer: Schleicher
- Designer: Rudolf Kaiser
- Number built: over 1,100

History
- First flight: November 1957

The Schleicher K 8 (also known as Ka-8) is a single-seat glider designed by Rudolf Kaiser and built by the Alexander Schleicher company in Germany.

== Design and development ==
The K 8 was derived from the earlier Ka 6 design as a simple single-place sailplane with air brakes using construction techniques similar to the Schleicher K 7, simplified for amateur construction from kits. Emphasis was placed on rugged construction, good climbing ability in thermals and good handling characteristics.

The prototype K 8 made its first flight in November 1957 and over 1,100 were built in three main versions. The original K 8 had a very small canopy. Side windows for improved visibility were introduced in the next version, and the K 8B, by far the most numerous variant, has a larger one-piece blown Plexiglas canopy. The K 8C features a longer nose, a larger main wheel located ahead of the center of gravity and the deletion of the larger wooden nose skid resulting in a roomier cockpit.

The cantilever high wings are single-spar structures of pine and plywood, with a plywood leading edge torsion box and fabric covering aft of the spar; the forward sweep is 1° 18' and dihedral is 3°. There are Schempp-Hirth air brakes on the upper and lower surfaces and the wooden ailerons are plywood covered. The cantilever tail unit is of similar construction to the wings, with ply-covered fixed surfaces and fabric-covered rudder and elevators, and a trim tab in the elevator is an optional fitting. The fuselage is a welded steel-tube structure, with fabric covering over spruce longerons and a glass fibre nose cone.

There is a non-retractable and unsprung monowheel, with an optional brake, and a nose skid mounted on rubber blocks in front of it, plus a steel skid at the tail.

== Operational history ==
Karl Striedieck of the United States made a 767 km / 476.6 mile ridge flight in an K 8B to establish a world out-and-return record in 1968.

== Motor glider variants ==
A motor glider conversion of the K 8B was developed by LVD (the Flying Training School of the Detmold Aero Club) similar to their conversion of a Scheibe Bergfalke IV known as the BF IV-BIMO, in which a Lloyd LS-400 piston engine mounted in the fuselage drives a pair of small two-blade pusher propellers rotating within cutouts in each wing near the trailing edge.

Another motorglider conversion was used by "Vestjysk Svæveflyveklub" in Denmark: it had a small Wankel rotary engine mounted in a nacelle on an aluminium stick above the main spar. The engine was started with a recoil starter like a lawn mower. The high RPM of the device made it extremely unpopular: the propeller tips created a permanent sonic boom, that made the plane extremely noisy. The harassed citizens of Esbjerg nicknamed the plane 'the flying circular saw' and the engine was removed.

== Specifications (K 8B) ==
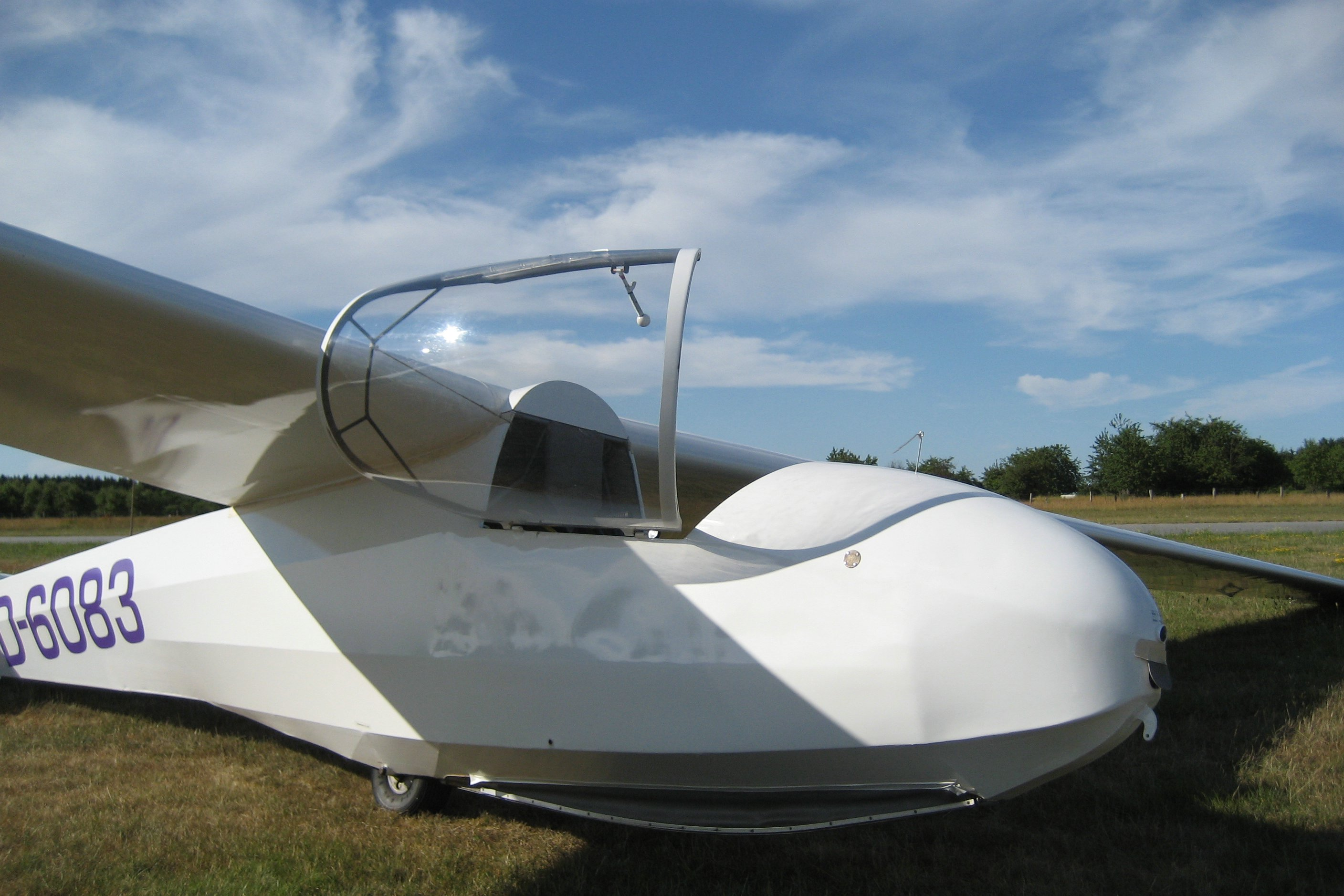
K 8b

Data from Jane's All The World's Aircraft 1966–67 and The World's Sailplanes:Die Segelflugzeuge der Welt:Les Planeurs du Monde Volume II

General characteristics

- Crew: 1
- Length: 7 m (23 ft 0 in)
- Wingspan: 15 m (49 ft 3 in)
- Wing area: 14.15 m^{2} (152.3 sq ft)
- Aspect ratio: 15.9
- Airfoil: Root: Göttingen 533 16.7%,Mid: Göttingen 533, Tip: Göttingen 532
- Empty weight: 191 kg (421 lb)
- Gross weight: 310 kg (683 lb)

Performance

- Stall speed: 55 km/h (34 mph, 30 kn)
- Never exceed speed: 200 km/h (120 mph, 110 kn)
- Rough air speed max: 130 km/h (81 mph; 70 kn)
- Aerotow speed: 130 km/h (81 mph; 70 kn)
- Winch launch speed: 100 km/h (62 mph; 54 kn)
- Terminal velocity: with full airbrakes 207 km/h (129 mph; 112 kn)
- g limits: +4 -2 at 151 km/h (94 mph; 82 kn)
- Maximum glide ratio: 27 at 73 km/h (45 mph; 39 kn)
- Rate of sink: 0.67 m/s (132 ft/min) at 60 km/h (37 mph; 32 kn)
- Wing loading: 21.8 kg/m^{2} (4.5 lb/sq ft)

== See also ==
Aircraft of comparable role, configuration, and era

- Scheibe L-Spatz
- Schneider ES-60

Related lists

- List of gliders
