= Schleicher Ka 3 =

German single seat training glider

Ka 3
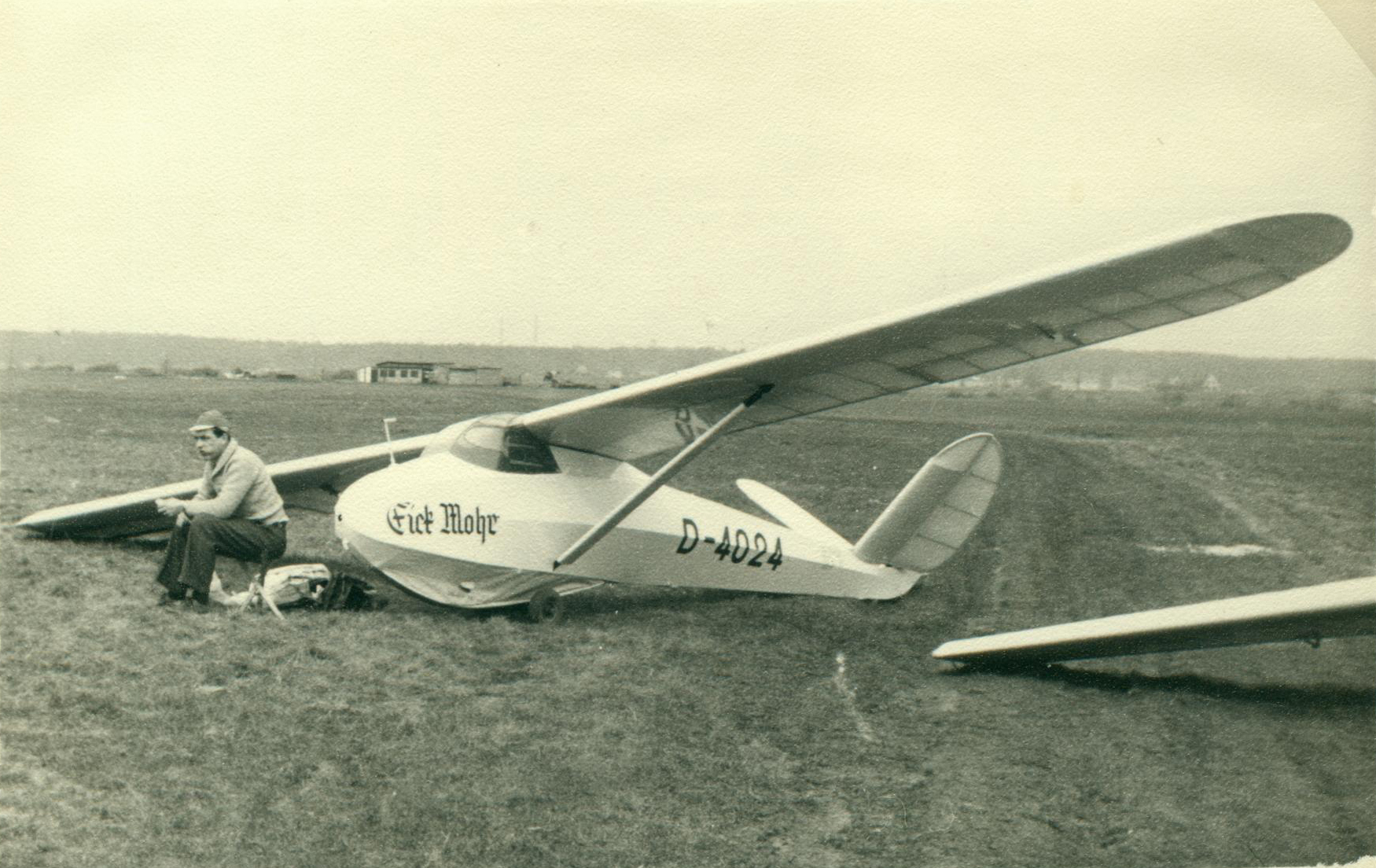
- Prototype Ka 3 in 1954

General information
- Type: Single seat training glider
- National origin: Germany
- Manufacturer: Alexander Schleicher Segelflugzeugbau
- Designer: Rudolf Kaiser
- Number built: 15

History
- First flight: 1954

The Schleicher Ka 3 or Kaiser Ka 3, is a 1950s single seat training glider, mostly sold in kit form.

== Design and development ==
The Ka 3 and its predecessor the Ka 1 were mostly sold as kits for home assembly. Apart from their fuselages the two types are very close in appearance, simplicity, weight and performance. They share a round tipped high wing with constant chord and no sweep, mounted with 2.5° of dihedral and braced with a single lift strut on each side from the lower fuselage to the wing at about one third span. Plain, constant-chord ailerons reach almost from the tips to about mid span and upper wing spoilers are placed at mid chord, inboard of the ailerons. Both have 37° butterfly tails with straight leading edges and round tips and trailing edges.

The Ka 1 has a ply-covered, rounded wooden-framed fuselage but that of the Ka 3 is more angular, steel tube-framed, fabric covered and slightly longer. Both have a simple, deep, sprung landing skid reaching from the nose to under the trailing edge of the wing, assisted by a tail bumper. Their cockpits are under the wing leading edge, into which the clear canopy extends.

The Ka 1 first flew in 1951 and ten were built; the Ka 3 followed in 1954 with fifteen eventually completed. One Ka 1 and two Ka 3s remained on the German civil aircraft register in 2010. One is one display at the Gliding Heritage Centre.

== Variants ==
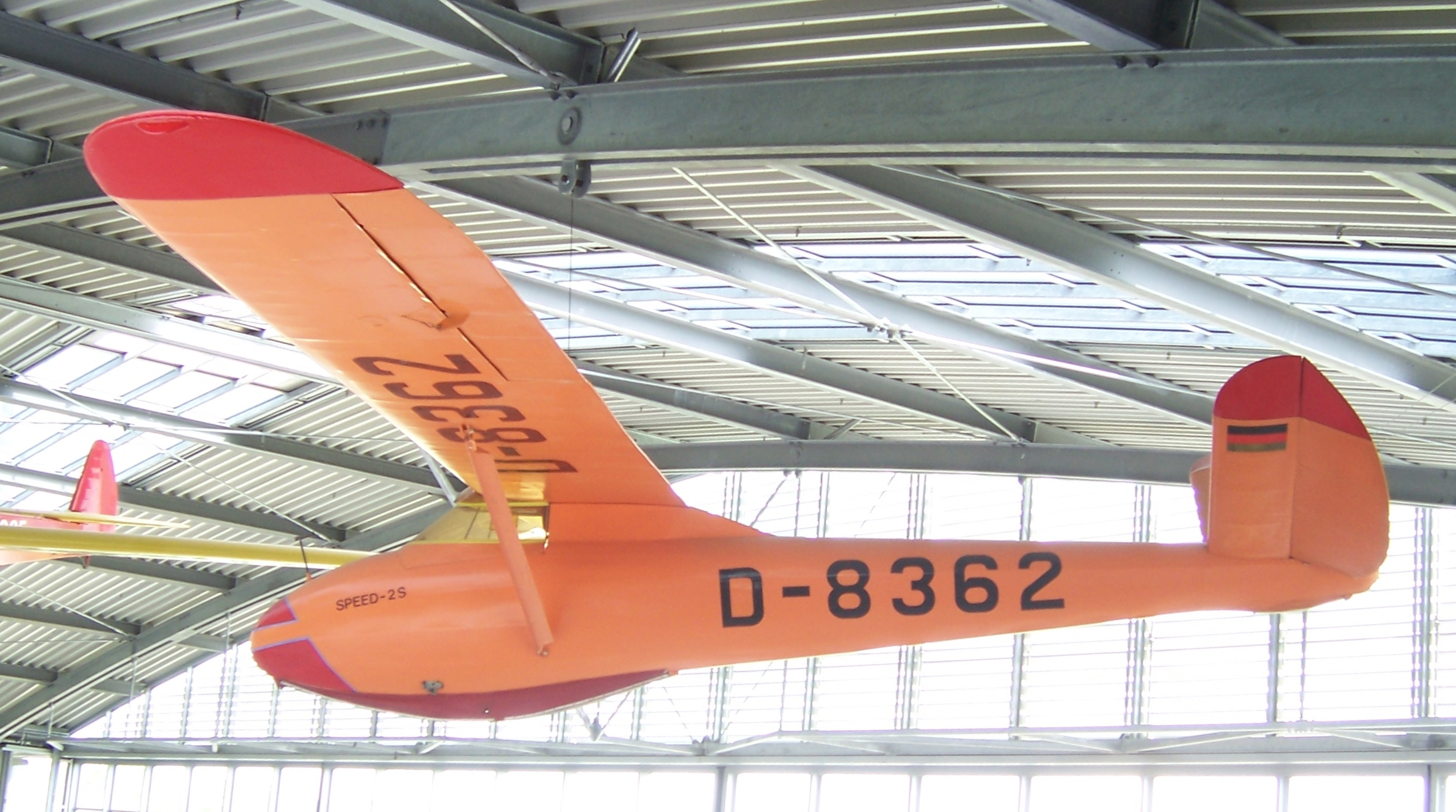
Ka 1 in the Deutsches Museum Flugwerft Schleissheim

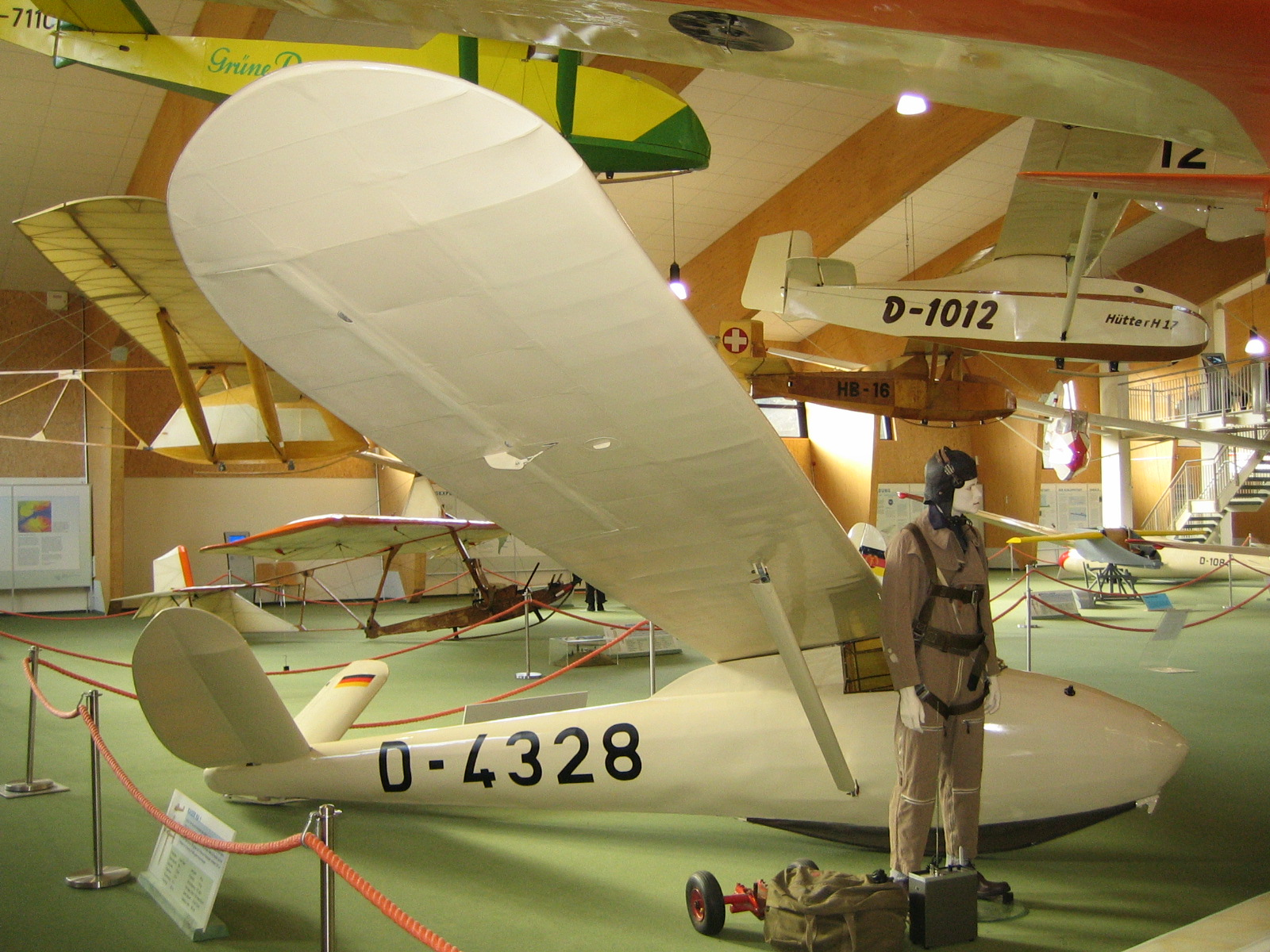
Ka 1 in the Wasserkuppe museum

Ka 1 Rhönlaus
Original version with rounded, wooden fuselage. First flown 1951. 10 built.
Ka 3
Development with a slightly longer, fabric-covered steel-tube fuselage. Performance and weights as Ka 1. First flown in 1954. 15 produced.

== Specifications (Ka 3) ==
Data from The World's Sailplanes pp.83-5

General characteristics

- Crew: One
- Length: 5.45 m (17 ft 11 in)
- Wingspan: 10.00 m (32 ft 10 in)
- Wing area: 9.9 m^{2} (107 sq ft)
- Aspect ratio: 10.1
- Airfoil: Göttingen 549
- Empty weight: 100 kg (220 lb) equipped
- Max takeoff weight: 195 kg (430 lb)
- Wing loading: 19.7 kg/m^{2} (4.04 lb/sq ft) maximum

Performance

- Maximum speed: 160 km/h (99 mph, 86 kn) placard, smooth air. All performance figures at a flying weight of 180 kg (397 lb)
- Maximum speed, placard, rough air: 100 km/h (62 mph; 54 kn)
- Maximum aero-tow speed: 100 km/h (62 mph; 54 kn)
- Maximum winch launch speed: 90 km/h (56 mph; 49 kn)
- Stall speed: 53 km/h (33 mph, 29 kn)
- Maximum glide ratio: best, 17.5:1 at 75 km/h (47 mph; 40 kn)
- Rate of sink: 1.0 m/s (200 ft/min) at 65 km/h (40 mph; 35 kn)

== See also ==
Related lists

- List of gliders
