= Schleicher ASK 13 =

German two-seat glider aircraft, 1966

ASK 13
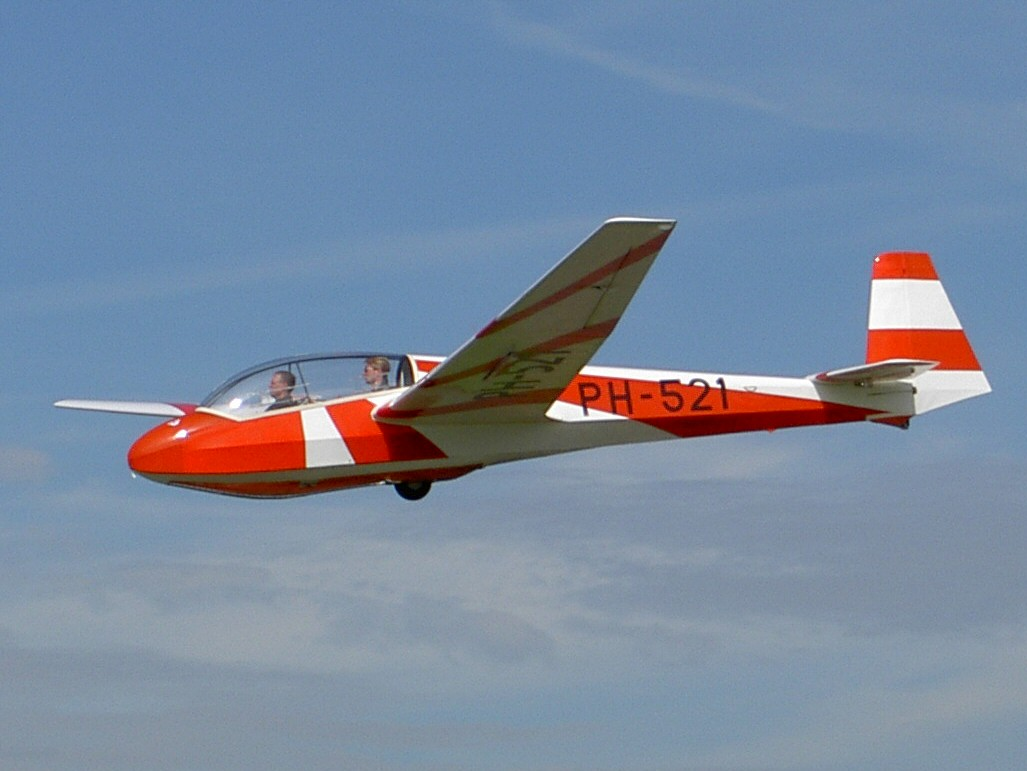

General information
- Type: Sailplane
- National origin: Germany
- Manufacturer: Schleicher
- Designer: Rudolf Kaiser
- Number built: 700+

History
- First flight: July 1966

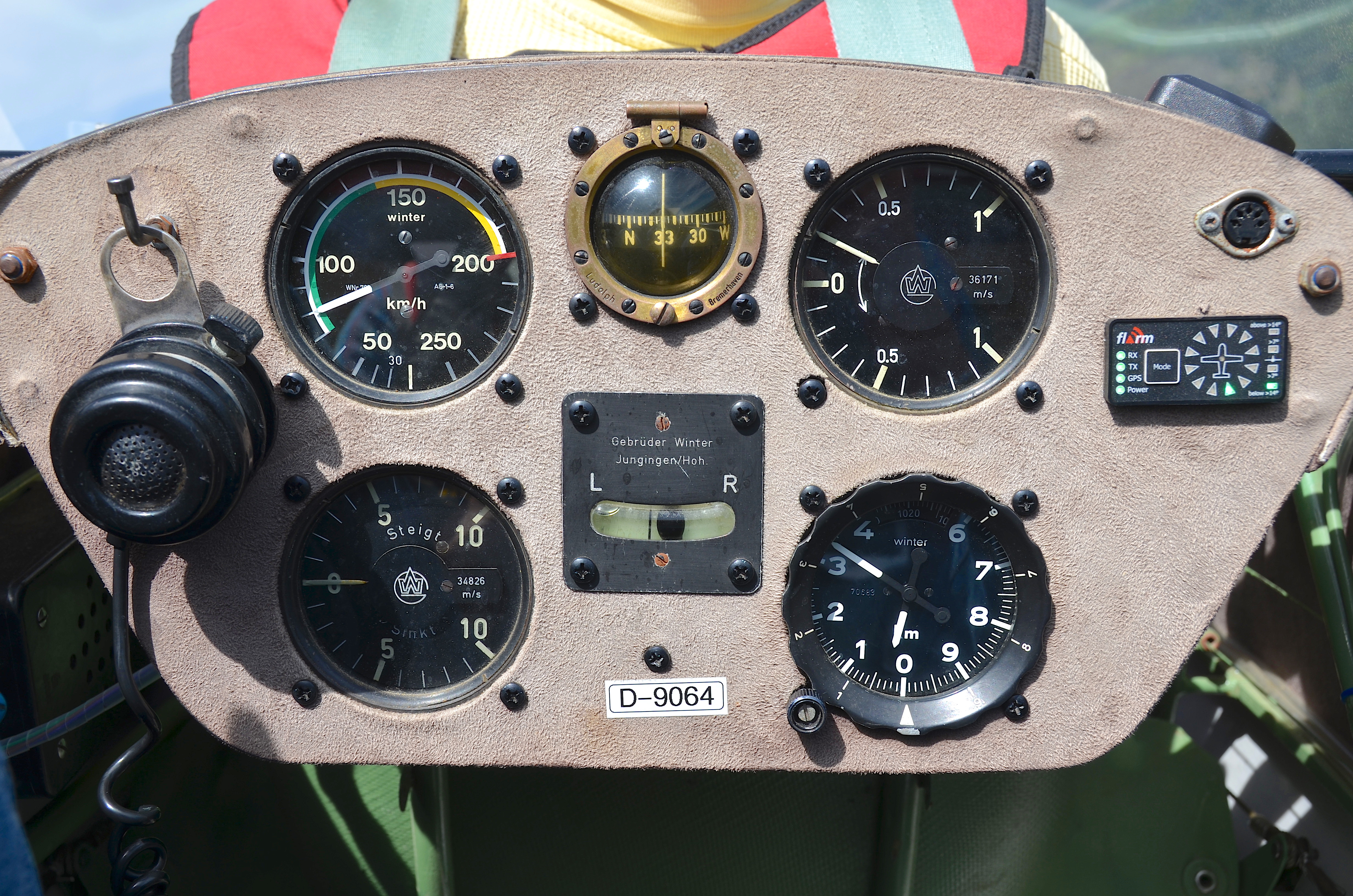
Instrument panel of ASK 13

The ASK 13 is a two-seater glider that was built by German sailplane manufacturer Alexander Schleicher Gmbh & Co. It was and still is widely used for basic training of glider pilots.

== Design and development ==
In 1965 Rudolf Kaiser continued development of the two-seat Ka 2 and Schleicher Ka 7 by introducing the ASK 13, using a mixture of materials including metal, wood and fibreglass. It has swept-forward single-spar wings, positioned lower than in the Ka 7, which allows for a large blown canopy providing a good all-round view for both pilots.

The 6 degree forward sweep of the wing allows the rear pilot to be seated near the centres of gravity and lift. The glider therefore maintains the same trim whether flown single seated or dual seated. The D-type leading edge torsion box is of plywood and the whole wing is fabric-covered. There are metal Schempp-Hirth air brakes above and below the wing, and the wooden ailerons are fabric-covered. The fuselage is a welded steel tube structure with spruce stringers and fabric-covered overall, except for the nose, which is fibreglass. The tail unit is plywood-covered, except for the rear part of the rudder and elevators, which are fabric-covered, and there is a trim tab in the starboard elevator.

Landing gear consists of a non-retractable sprung wheel, mounted aft of the centre of gravity. The original design featured a skid under the nose and tail, although on many K13s these have been replaced with wheels to make handling on hard surfaces easier.

It first flew in prototype form in July 1966 and by January 1978 a total of approximately 700 ASK 13s had been built by Schleicher. They are superb training gliders because they stall and spin well but these manoeuvres are easy to recover from. Their construction also gives them great strength and yet they are easily repairable.

The aircraft was succeeded by the ASK 21.

== Specifications ==
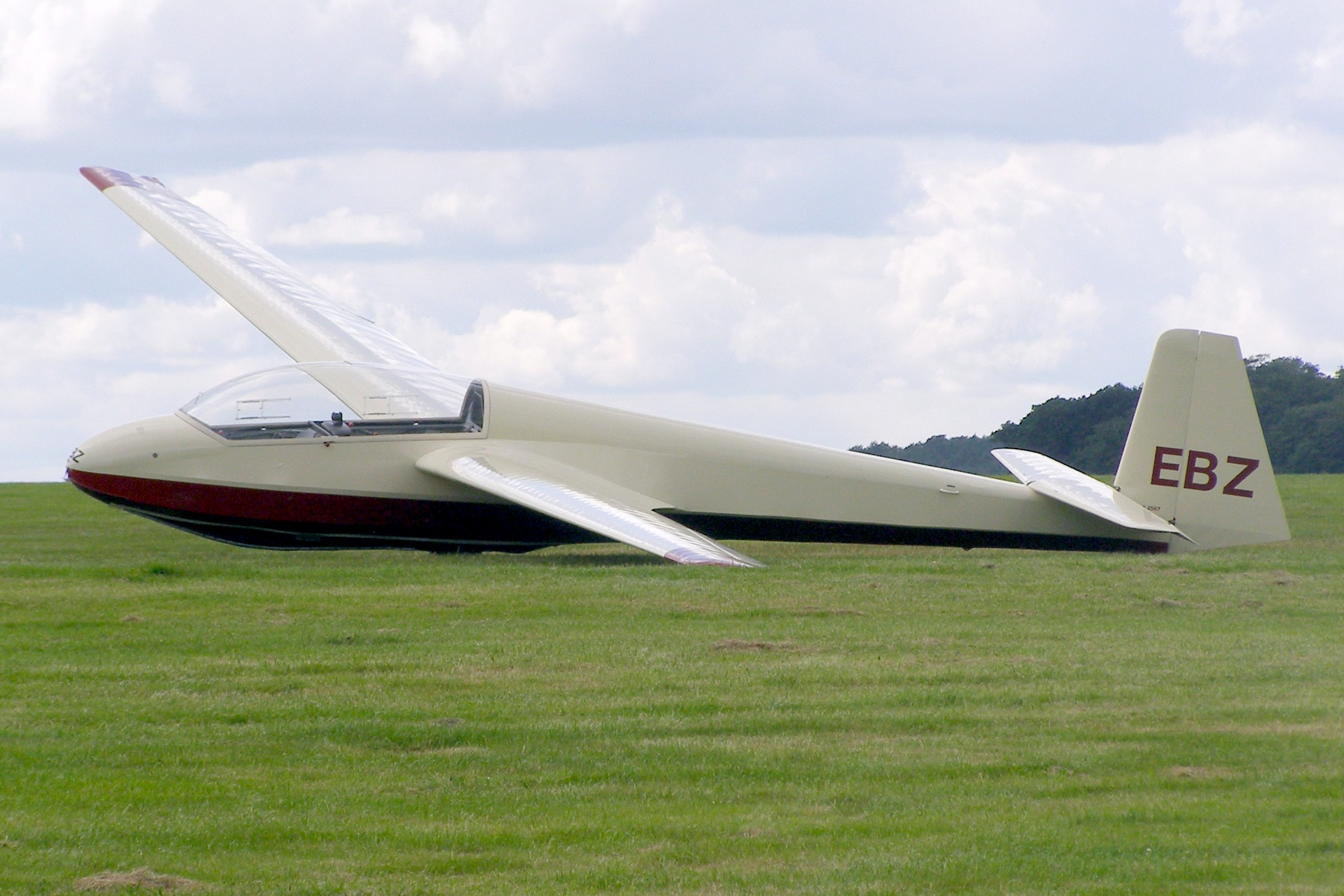
1979-built ASK 13

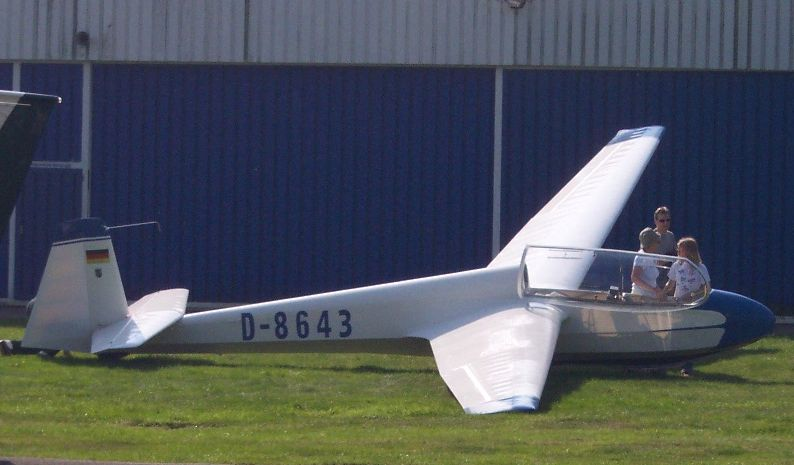

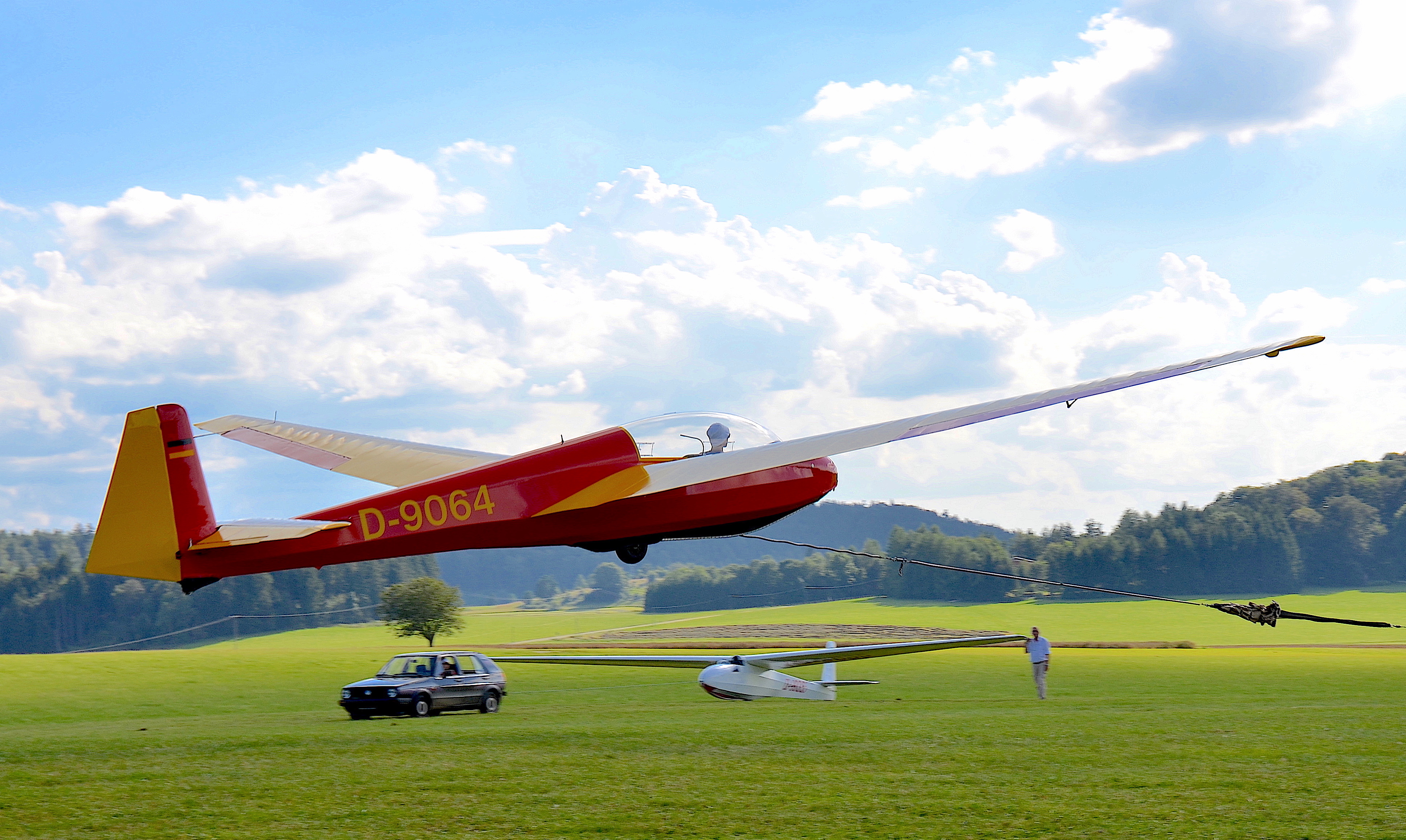
Pull up of ASK 13 at Degerfeld airfield (2016)

Data from Flight manual

General characteristics

- Crew: 2
- Length: 8.18 m (26 ft 10 in)
- Wingspan: 16 m (52 ft 6 in)
- Height: 1.6 m (5 ft 3 in)
- Wing area: 17.5 m^{2} (188 sq ft)
- Aspect ratio: 14.6:1
- Airfoil: Gö 535/Gö 549
- Empty weight: 295 kg (650 lb)
- Max takeoff weight: 480 kg (1,058 lb)

Performance

- Stall speed: 57 km/h (35 mph, 31 kn)
- Never exceed speed: 200 km/h (120 mph, 110 kn) in smooth air

140 km/h (76 kn) in rough air
140 km/h (76 kn) on aero-tow
120 km/h (65 kn) on winch launch (58kn with Tost black cable weak link)

- g limits: +4.0 -2.0 at 140 km/h (76 kn)
- Maximum glide ratio: 27 at 85 km/h (46 kn)
- Rate of sink: 0.80 m/s (157 ft/min) at 68 km/h (37 kn)
- Wing loading: 27.7 kg/m^{2} (5.7 lb/sq ft)

== See also ==
Aircraft of comparable role, configuration, and era

- PZL Bielsko SZD-9
- LET L-13 Blaník
- CVT M-200
- Scheibe Bergfalke

Related lists

- List of gliders
