= Schleicher K 10 =

German single-seat glider, 1963

K 10

General information
- Type: Standard class glider
- National origin: Germany
- Manufacturer: Alexander Schleicher Segelflugzeugbau
- Designer: Rudolf Kaiser
- Number built: 12

History
- First flight: August 1963

The Schleicher K 10 is a Standard class competition glider, designed by Rudolf Kaiser and built in Germany in 1963. Only a few were produced.

== Design and development ==
The K 10 is a cantilever shoulder wing glider with a single spar wing built from pine and plywood. Its covering is mostly fabric but glass fibre is used in places where the surface has double curvature. Airfoils by Professor Franz Wortmann replaced the NACA 63 series profiles of the successful Schleicher Ka 6 with the intention of producing higher speeds. The leading edge is straight and unswept, but a swept trailing edge produces a forward sweep at quarter chord of 1.2°. There is 3° of dihedral. The taper increases slightly on the outer wing panels, where ply covered ailerons are hinged on the upper wing surfaces. Schempp-Hirth airbrakes are fitted inboard.

Its fuselage is a ply shell formed around wooden bulkheads and stringers and again GRP is used for areas with double curvature. The cockpit is enclosed by a moulded Perspex canopy. The tail surfaces are straight tapered and built in the same way as the wings. It has all-moving elevators mounted on the fin at the top of the fuselage, far enough forward that only a small cut out was required for movement of the fabric covered rudder, which extends down to the keel. The K 10 has a fixed, semi-recessed monowheel undercarriage assisted by a tail skid.

The K 10 made its first flight in August 1963. The Wortmann profiles did improve high speed performance but the K 10 lost the excellent low-speed handling characteristics of the Ka 6, so only twelve K 10s were built and Kaiser's attention turned to producing an improved Ka 6, the Ka 6E, which adopted the all-moving tailplane of the K 10 but used the earlier NACA airfoils. Three K 10s remained on the German civil aircraft register in 2010. A Swiss registered K 10 crashed fatally in 1999.

== Specifications ==
Data from Jane's All the World's Aircraft 1964/65.

General characteristics

- Crew: One
- Length: 6.64 m (21 ft 9 in)
- Wingspan: 15.00 m (49 ft 3 in)
- Height: 1.60 m (5 ft 3 in) over tail
- Wing area: 12.53 m^{2} (134.9 sq ft)
- Aspect ratio: 18
- Airfoil: Wortmann FX 40 (root). FX 291 (mid-span), FX 30 (tip)
- Empty weight: 220 kg (485 lb) equipped
- Max takeoff weight: 320 kg (705 lb)
- Wing loading: 25.5 kg/m^{2} (5.2 lb/sq ft)

Performance

- Maximum speed: 200 km/h (120 mph, 110 kn) smooth air
- Maximum speed, rough air: 140 km/h (87 mph; 76 kn)
- Maximum aero-tow speed: 140 km/h (87 mph; 76 kn)
- Maximum winch launch speed: 100 km/h (62 mph; 54 kn)
- Maximum glide ratio: best, 32:1

== See also ==
Related lists

- List of gliders
