= Schleicher ASK 21 =

German two-seat training glider, 1979

ASK 21
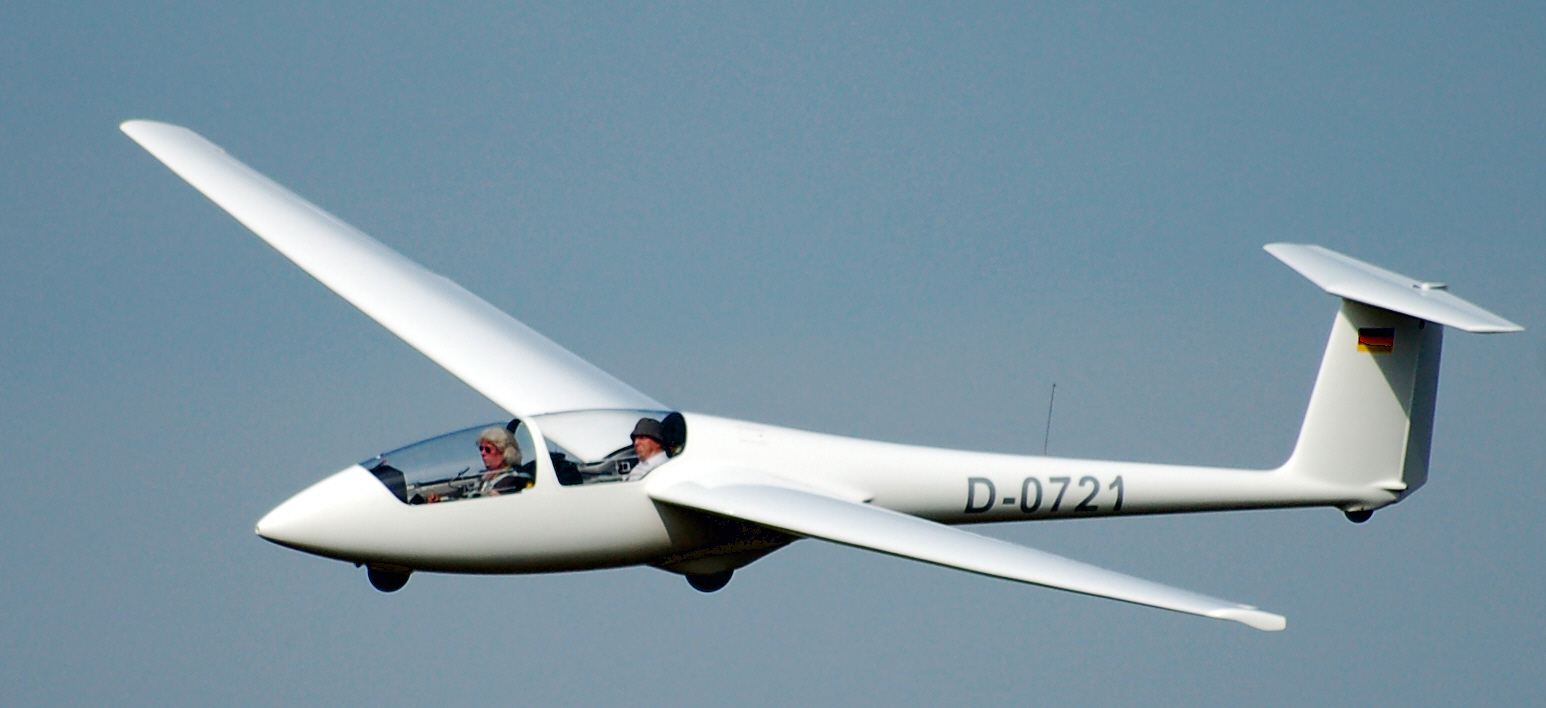
- Schleicher ASK 21

General information
- Type: Two Seater-class Or Club-class sailplane
- National origin: Germany
- Manufacturer: Alexander Schleicher GmbH & Co
- Designer: Rudolf Kaiser
- Number built: Over 1000

History
- Introduction date: 1979
- First flight: February 1979

The ASK 21 is a glass-reinforced plastic (GRP) two-seat glider aircraft with a T-tail. The ASK 21 is designed primarily for beginner instruction, but is also suitable for cross-country flying and aerobatic instruction.

== Design and development ==
The ASK 21 was designed by Rudolf Kaiser to replace the popular ASK 13, providing a modern two-seat aircraft bridging the gap between initial training and single-seat performance flying. The ASK 21 is the first full-GRP two-seater produced by Schleicher, flying for the first time in February 1979. Production also began in 1979. In 2003 the operating time was extended to 18,000 hours. In December 2004 the ASK 21 Mi, a self-launching version, made its first flight. A revised and improved version, the ASK 21B was introduced in 2018.

The ASK 21 remains in production (May 2024) with over 1000 examples completed.

=== Construction ===
The two seats are in a tandem arrangement with dual controls, adjustable rudder pedals and seatbacks. The fuselage consists of a tubular sandwich and thus offers passive safety with low weight. The two-piece, mid-set, cantilever wing is a single-spar glass-fiber construction without flaps, but with upper side Schempp-Hirth-type air brakes. The wingtips curve downward, providing tip skids that allow take-offs without a wing helper (small wheel added with ASK-21 mi). The T-tail possesses a fixed horizontal stabilizer and an elevator with spring trim and automatic connections. The undercarriage consists of two or three fixed wheels. The main wheel lies behind the centre of gravity and has a hydraulically operated disc brake. Checking the tire pressure is hindered by the need for removing the wheel fairing. The tail unit has a rubber skid or a tailwheel.

== Flight characteristics ==
The thick wing profile gives good low-speed characteristics (nominal stall speed approximately 65 km/h or 35 knots). The flight characteristics are docile; its stall is gentle, with ample vibration warning, and is easily recoverable. The nose does not noticeably drop, but the variometer indicates a high rate of descent and the vibration continues until back pressure is released and stall recovery is initiated.

Spin kit installation on the tail of C-FASK at the Bromont Airport in Quebec

The glider has little tendency to enter a spin. In order to make spinning possible for training purposes or demonstrations a spin kit is available from the manufacturer. It consists of ballast discs applied to the tail to change the center of gravity according to the weight of the crew. With this device the ASK 21 when slowed to stall speed with rudder input drops one wing and begins to rotate. Recovery is standard, utilizing neutralized ailerons, full opposite rudder until the rotation stops, centralizing the rudder and progressively moving the control column forward to reduce the angle of attack. As the glider recovers from the spin the control column is progressively moved backwards to pull out of the dive.

When entering a side slip, which is not uncommon as an energy management technique, the rudder can aerodynamically over centre, requiring an input from the pilot for the rudder pedals to return to neutral.

== Variants ==
ASK 21
Production sailplane
ASK 21 Mi
Self-launching sailplane, as ASK 21 with a retractable IAE R50-AA rotary engine with a fixed pitch propeller mounted behind the wing.
Vanguard TX.1
The ASK-21 acquired by the UK Ministry of Defence for use by the Air Cadet organisations.
ASK 21B
Improved version of the original ASK 21. New features: automatic control connections, internal spin ballast, revised canopy, more effective ailerons.

== Operators ==
=== Military ===
==== Current ====
Australia

- Royal Australian Air Force
  - Australian Air Force Cadets - 11

Portugal

- Portuguese Air Force
  - Portuguese Air Force Academy

==== Former ====
United Kingdom

- Royal Air Force for Air Training Corps (Vanguard TX.1)

=== Civilian ===
Canada

- Association de Vol à Voile Champlain - 2
- Cu Nim Gliding Club
- Great lakes Gliding Club
- Rideau Valley Soaring School
- Southern Ontario Soaring Association - 3
- York Soaring
- Youth Flight Canada
- Vancouver Island Soaring Center

Netherlands

- Aeroclub Salland
- Venlo Eindhovense zweefvliegclub
- Twentsche zweefvliegclub - 1

United Kingdom

- Yorkshire Gliding Club - 2
- Devon and Somerset Gliding Club
- Edgehill Gliding Club -1
- Cambridge Gliding Centre - 2
- London Gliding Club - 7
- Booker Gliding Club - 2
- Buckminster Gliding Club
- Norfolk Gliding Club
- Midland Gliding Club
- Cranwell Gliding Club
- Kent Gliding Club
- Scottish Gliding Union
- Portsmouth Naval Gliding Centre - 3
- Army Gliding Club Wyvern - 2

United States

- High Desert Soaring Club
- Mid Atlantic Soaring Association - 2
- Texas Soaring Association
- Caesar Creek Soaring Club - 2
- Blue Ridge Soaring Society - 3
- Soaring Society of Boulder
- Greater Boston Soaring Club - 2

Australia

- Bathurst Soaring Club - 2 (1 ASK 21, 1 ASK 21 Mi)
- Beverley Soaring Society - 1

== Specifications (ASK 21) ==
K21 Three-view drawing

Data from Jane's All the World's Aircraft 1988-89

General characteristics

- Crew: 1 student, 1 instructor
- Length: 8.35 m (27 ft 5 in)
- Wingspan: 17 m (55 ft 9 in)
- Height: 1.55 m (5 ft 1 in)
- Wing area: 17.95 m^{2} (193.2 sq ft)
- Aspect ratio: 16:1
- Airfoil: FX S02-196 / FX 60-126
- Empty weight: 360 kg (794 lb)
- Max takeoff weight: 600 kg (1,323 lb)

Performance

- Stall speed: 65 km/h (40 mph, 35 kn)
- Never exceed speed: 280 km/h (170 mph, 150 kn) in smooth air

200 km/h (110 kn) in rough air
180 km/h (97 kn) on aero-tow
150 km/h (81 kn) on winch launch

- g limits: +6.5 -4 at 180 km/h (97 kn)
- Maximum glide ratio: 34 at 90 km/h (49 kn)
- Rate of sink: 0.64 m/s (126 ft/min) at 67 km/h (36 kn)
- Wing loading: 33.4 kg/m^{2} (6.8 lb/sq ft)

== See also ==
- IS 28 B2
- Schleicher ASK 23
- ZS Jezow PW-6U
- Grob G103a Twin II
- PZL Bielsko SZD-50
