= Schleicher K7 =

German two-seat glider, 1960

K7 Rhönadler
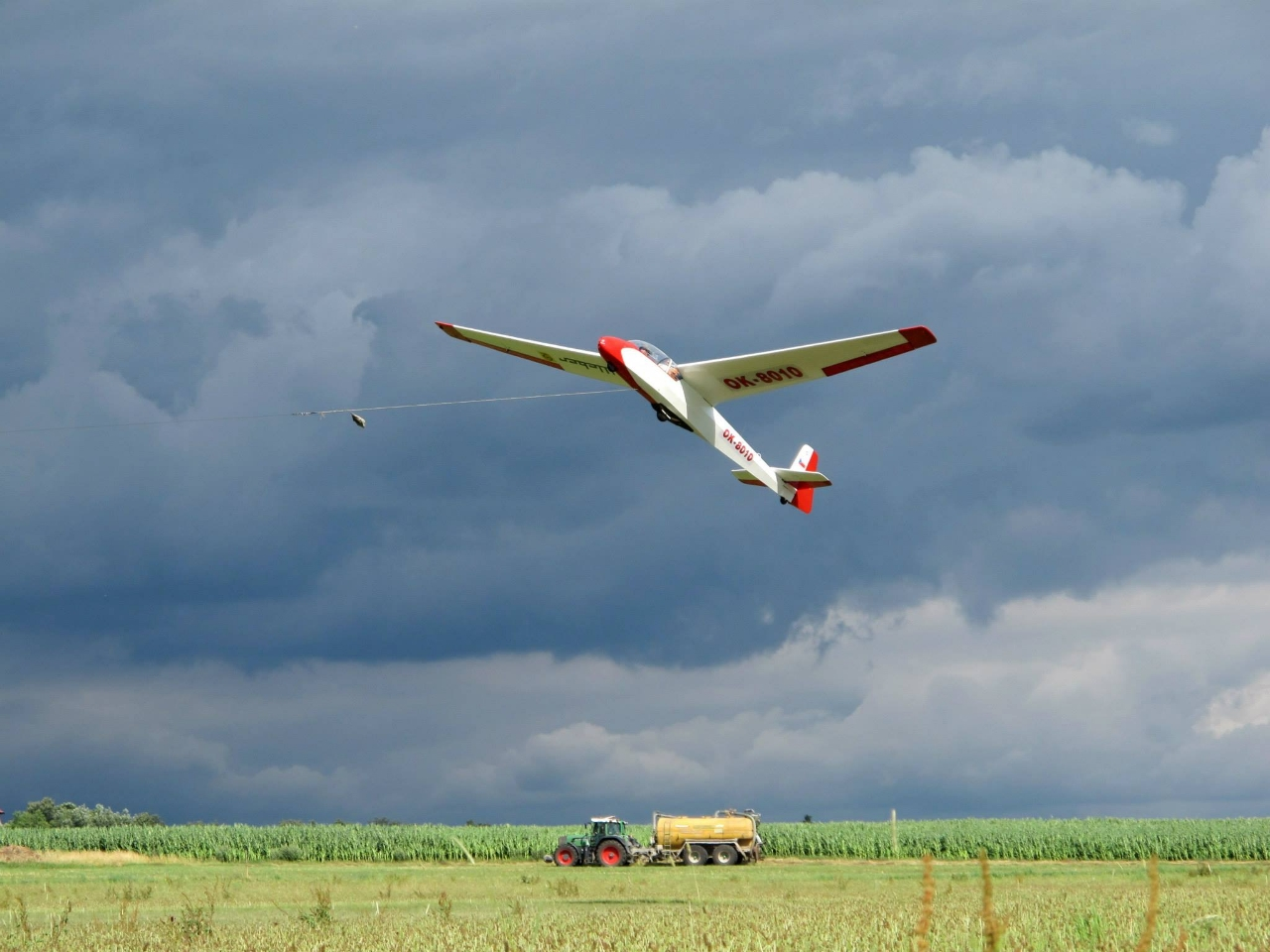

General information
- Type: Glider
- National origin: West Germany
- Manufacturer: Alexander Schleicher GmbH & Co
- Designer: Rudolf Kaiser
- Status: Production completed
- Number built: 550

History
- Introduction date: 1960
- Developed from: Schleicher Ka-2
- Variant: Schleicher ASK 13

The Schleicher K7 Rhönadler is a West German high-wing, two-seat, glider that was designed by Rudolf Kaiser and produced by Alexander Schleicher GmbH & Co.

Often referred to as the Ka-7 or K-7, the US Federal Aviation Administration type certificate officially designates it as the K7.

== Design and development ==
The K7 was intended as a two-place trainer with good performance, a rare combination in trainers of its time.

The K7 is constructed with a welded steel tube fuselage, covered in doped aircraft fabric covering. The wing is a wooden structure with a doped fabric covering and employs a Goettingen 533 (16%) airfoil at the wing root, transitioning to a Goettingen 533 (14%) section at the wing tip. The wing features powerful dive brakes. The landing gear is a fixed monowheel. The earlier Ka-2 variant has a plywood monocoque fuselage.

After 550 had been built, the K7 was superseded in production by the Schleicher ASK 13.

The K7 can be converted into a K7/13 with a conversion kit to lower the wing to the mid-wing position and installation of a one-piece canopy, rendering the aircraft similar to the ASK-13.

== Operational history ==
A K7 was flown to a new world multi-place glider speed record for flight around a 500 km (311 mi) triangle of 84 km/h (52 mph) in 1964 in South Africa.

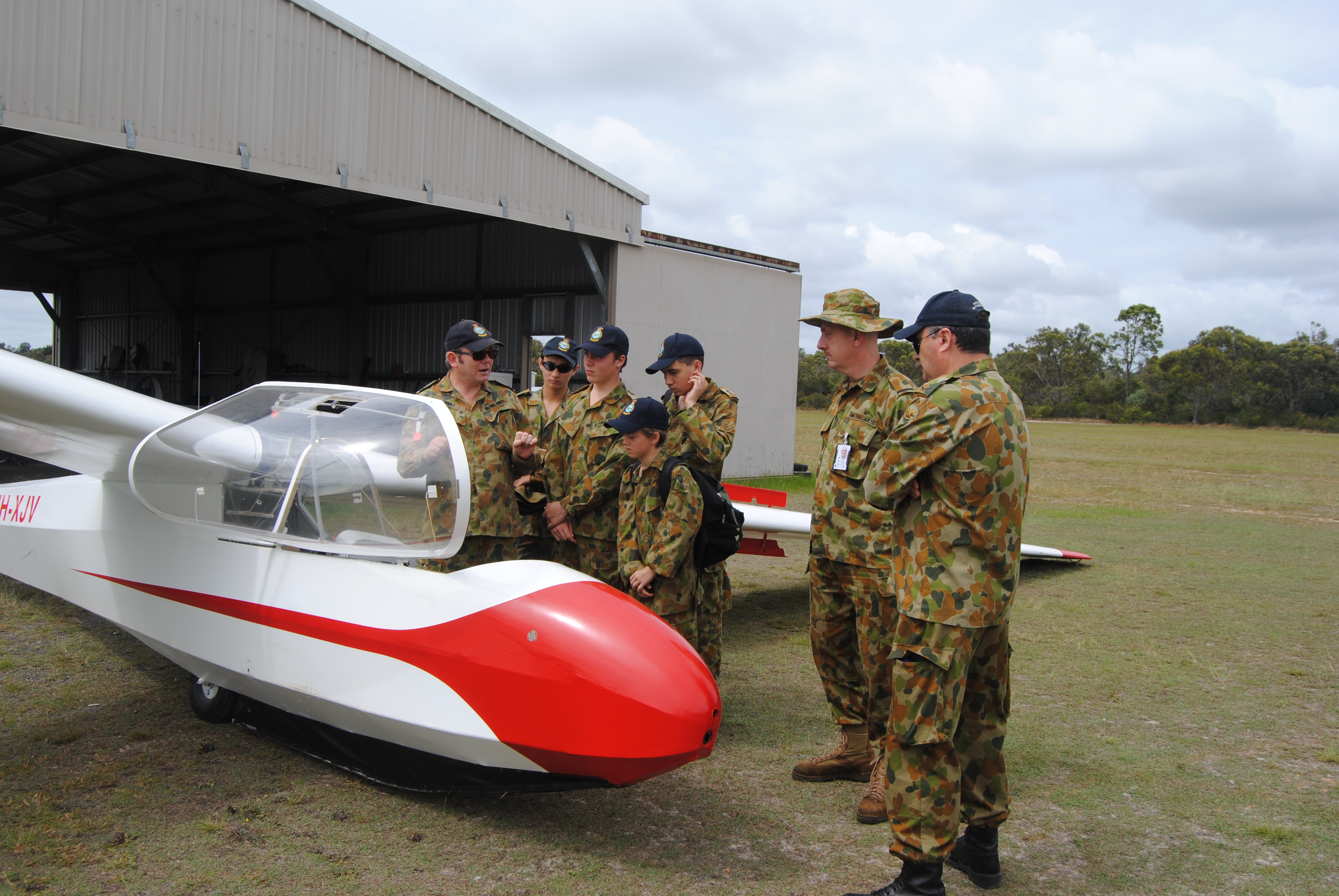
Australian Air Force Cadets being taught how to operate the Ka-7 in 2010.

A K7 was assigned to 2 Wing AAFC and used to train Australian Air Force Cadets 228 Squadron at Bundaberg from 2007 to 2014.

== Variants ==
Ka 2

Early version with a plywood monocoque fuselage
K7
Main production version with a steel tube fuselage.
K7/13
K7 converted to a mid-wing arrangement, plus a single piece canopy, to resemble an AS-K 13

== Specifications (K7) ==
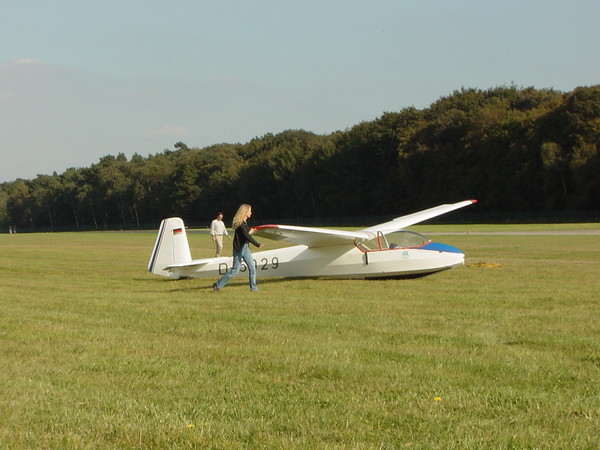
K7 after landing

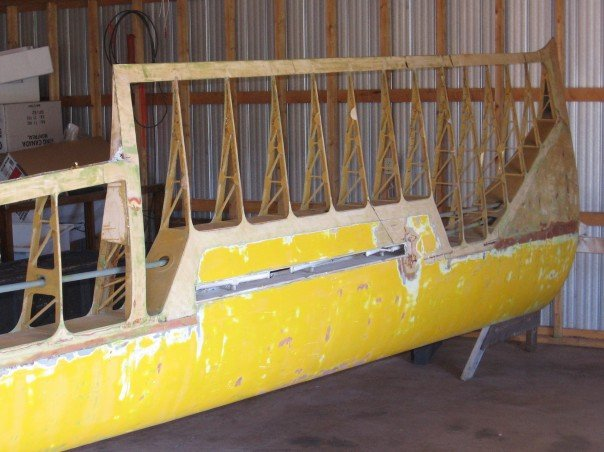
K7 wing being recovered, showing the wooden structure

Data from Sailplane Directory, Soaring and FAA Type Certificate 7g3, and The World's Sailplanes:Die Segelflugzeuge der Welt:Les Planeurs du Monde

General characteristics

- Crew: one
- Capacity: one passenger
- Length: 8.15 m (26 ft 9 in)
- Wingspan: 16.0 m (52 ft 6 in)
- Wing area: 17.56 m^{2} (189.0 sq ft)
- Aspect ratio: 14.6:1
- Airfoil: root: Goettingen 533 (16%), mid: Goettingen 533 (14%), tip: Goettingen 533 (14%)
- Empty weight: 282 kg (622 lb)
- Max takeoff weight: 484.5 kg (1,068 lb)

Performance

- Stall speed: 59 km/h (37 mph, 32 kn)
- Never exceed speed: 200 km/h (120 mph, 110 kn)
- Rough air speed max: 130 km/h (81 mph; 70 kn)
- Aerotow speed: 130 km/h (81 mph; 70 kn)
- Winch launch speed: 100 km/h (62 mph; 54 kn)
- g limits: +4 -2
- Maximum glide ratio: 26:1 at 83 km/h (52 mph)
- Rate of sink: 0.70 m/s (138 ft/min) at 67 km/h (42 mph)
- Wing loading: 27.34 kg/m^{2} (5.60 lb/sq ft)

== See also ==
Aircraft of comparable role, configuration, and era

- Rubik R-26 Góbé
- Scheibe Bergfalke
- SZD-9 Bocian

Related lists

- List of gliders
