= Rudolf Kaiser =

German aerospace engineer

Rudolf Kaiser (10 September 1922 – 11 September 1991) was a designer of gliders who worked for Alexander Schleicher GmbH & Co.

The designs of Rudolf Kaiser have proven themselves for over 50 years all over the world. His designs for Schleichers can be recognised by the K in the ASK designation. The designs that he did on his own account have the designation Ka.

He was born in Coburg, Germany, and graduated in house construction in 1952. However at the same time he took up gliding. He built a small single seater, the Ka 1 at his home in 1952 to perfect his design skills. (He used it to get his 'Silver C' gliding badge.) His next glider, the two-seat Ka 2, was created for Alexander Schleicher, the sailplane manufacturer in Poppenhausen. Rudolf Kaiser also worked for Egon Scheibe designing the Ka 5 "Zugvogel" which was the best performing production sailplane in the world at the time.

To earn his Gold C, he again built a sailplane for himself; the Ka 6. It won the OSTIV prize for the best new design in 1958. After Schleicher put it into production, it became the most popular Standard Class sailplane, winning two World Gliding Championships (1960 and 1963). 1368 Ka 6's were built and many are still flying.

Kaiser then designed three more classic gliders:

- Schleicher K7 two-seat trainer (550 built)
- Schleicher ASK 13 two-seat trainer (645 built)
- Schleicher K 8 single-seat glider with 15 metre wingspan (1,212 built)

The K 8 was a single seater with similar characteristics to the two-seaters and so it is still a popular glider for early solo pilots who had trained on Kaiser's two seaters.

Further designs followed: the Schleicher ASK 18 single seater and two motorgliders, the ASK 14 and ASK 16. Kaiser then designed two glass-fibre gliders: the two-seat Schleicher ASK 21 trainer, which first flew in 1978, and the single-seat Schleicher ASK 23 which filled the role of the K 8. The ASK 23 first flew in 1983. When the certification process of the ASK 23 was complete Rudolf Kaiser retired at the age of 61.
