= Schleicher Ka 6 =

German single-seat club class glider made of wood and fabric covering, 1955

Ka 6
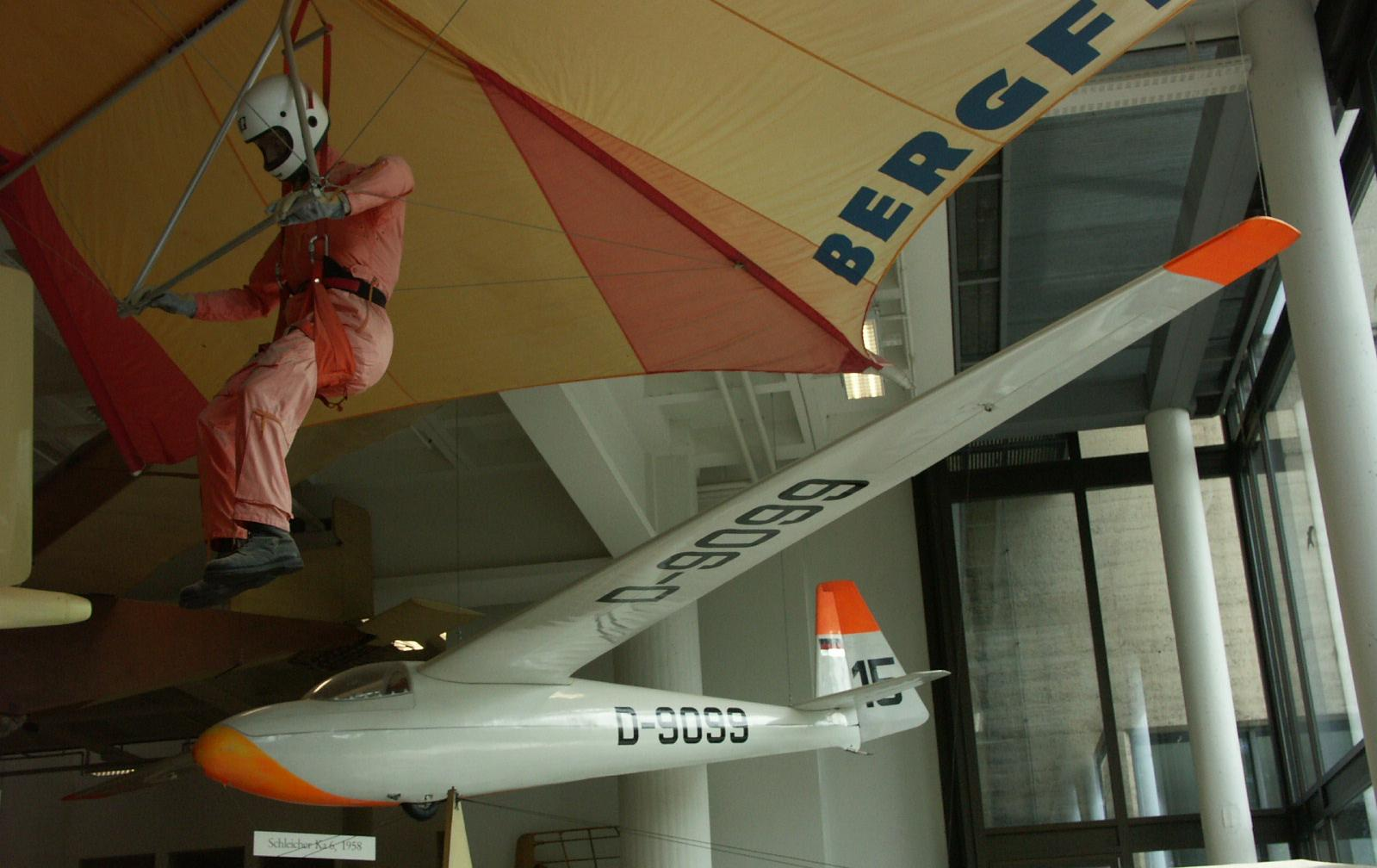
- Ka 6 on display in the Deutsches Museum, Munich

General information
- Type: Club class glider
- Manufacturer: Alexander Schleicher GmbH & Co
- Designer: Rudolf Kaiser
- Number built: > 1000 (all variants)

History
- First flight: 1955

The Schleicher Ka 6 is a single-seat glider designed by Rudolf Kaiser, built by Alexander Schleicher GmbH & Co, Germany and is constructed of spruce and plywood with fabric covering. The design initially featured a conventional tailplane and elevator which was later replaced by an all-moving tailplane in the -Pe and Ka 6E variants. Variants built before the -CR and -BR used a main skid as the principal undercarriage, with later variants including the Ka 6E using a wheel as the main undercarriage with no nose skid. Other modifications for the Ka 6E include a more aerodynamic fuselage with glassfibre nose and wingroot fairings, longer canopy, and modified aluminium airbrakes.

== Variants ==
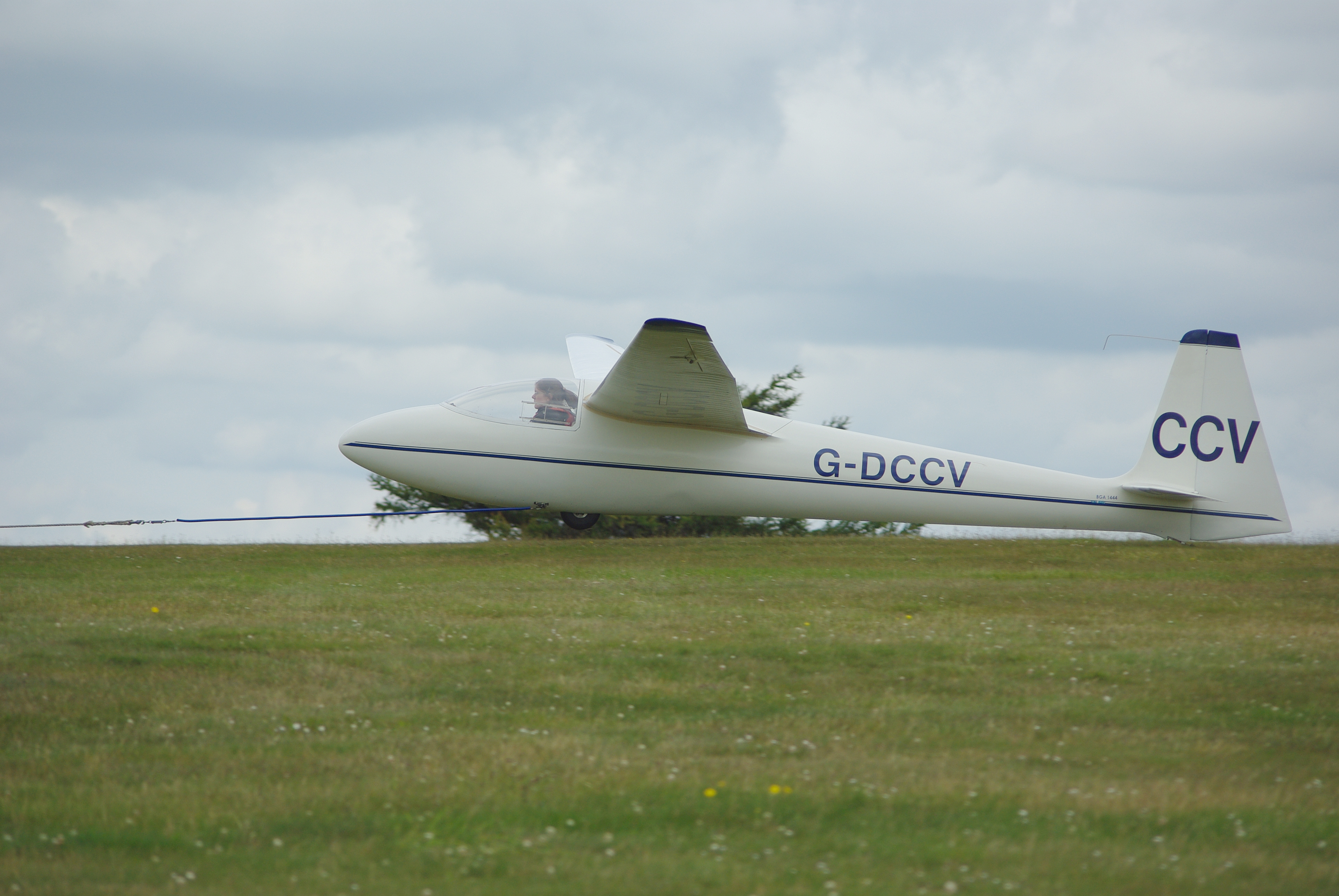
KA 6E G-DCCV at the Vintage Glider Rally at Camphill, 2011

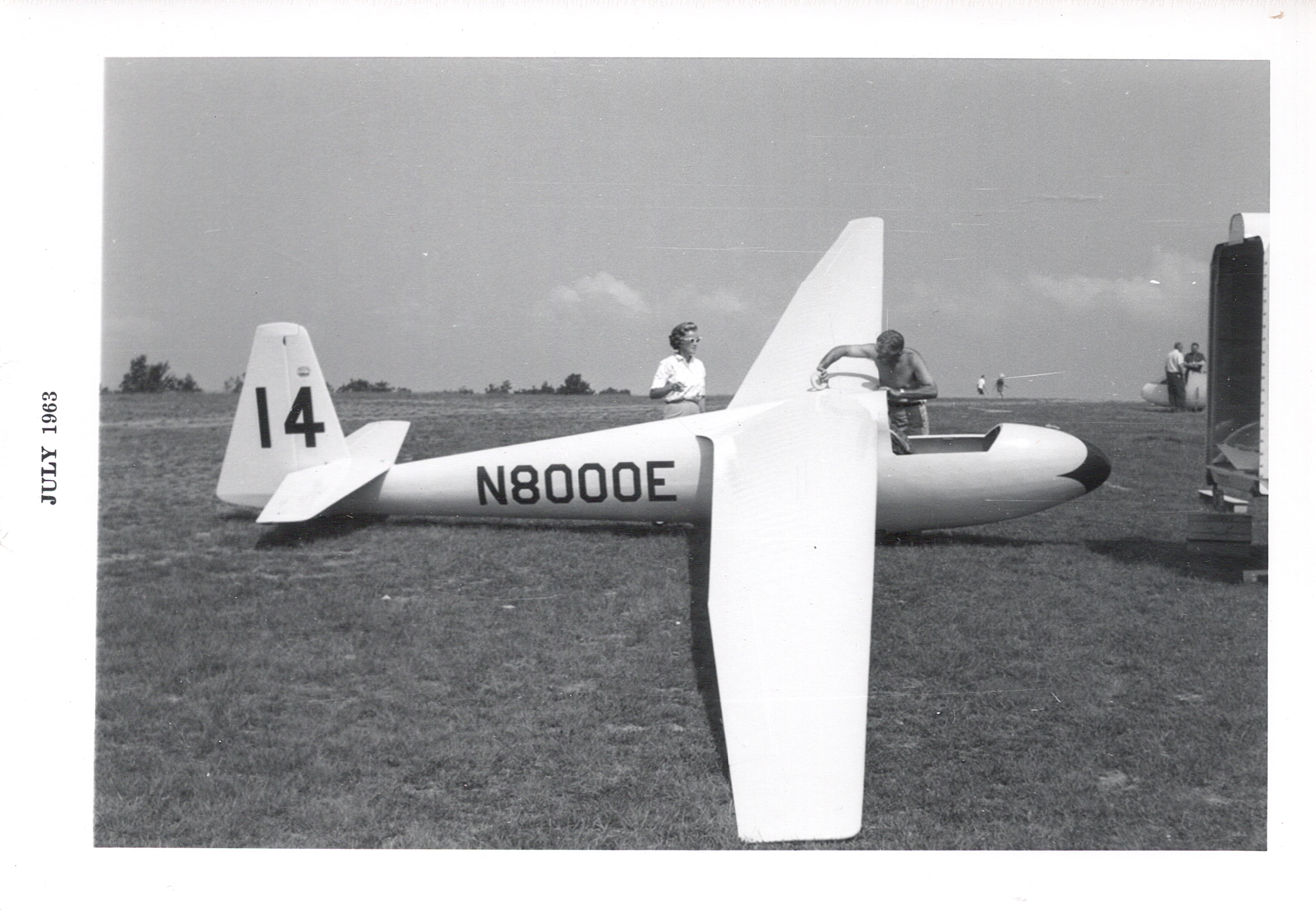
Mr. and Mrs. Fritz Sebek preen their Ka-6BR at Harris Hill, New York.

External image
- Ka 6E with open cockpit

Dates of initial airworthiness approval in brackets:

- Ka 6 – Initial version; span 14.4 m (47 ft 3 in), (30 October 1956).
- Ka 6B (27 September 1957).
- Ka 6B-Pe – The Ka 6B with all-flying tailplane, (20 May 1960).
- Ka 6BR – The Ka 6B with the main skid removed and a relocated mainwheel, (27 September 1957).
- Ka 6CR – The Ka 6C with the main skid removed and a relocated mainwheel, (24 February 1959).
- Ka 6CR-Pe – The Ka 6CR with all-flying tailplane, (20 May 1960).
- Ka 6E The ultimate Ka-6, with all-flying tailplane, (29 July 1965).

== Aircraft on display ==
- US Southwest Soaring Museum – Ka 6B-Pe and Ka 6e

== Specifications (Ka 6E) ==
Data from

General characteristics

- Crew: 1
- Length: 6.66 m (21 ft 10.25 in)
- Wingspan: 15 m (49 ft 2.5 in)
- Height: 1.6 m (5 ft 3 in)
- Wing area: 12.4 m^{2} (135.5 sq ft)
- Aspect ratio: 18.1
- Airfoil: Root: NACA 633-618 Mid: NACA 633-614 (with Wortmann leading edge modification)
- Empty weight: 190 kg (419 lb)
- Gross weight: 300 kg (661 lb)

Performance

- Maximum speed: 200 km/h (124 mph, 108 kn)
- Maximum glide ratio: 32:1 at 80 km/h (50 mph)
- Rate of sink: 0.65 m/s (128 ft/min)

== See also ==
Related lists

- List of gliders
