= Irena Kempówna =

Polish aviator (1920–2002)

- Born: 20 October 1920; Warsaw
- Died: 17 June 2002 (aged 81); Basel
- Other name: Irena Kempówna-Zabiełło
- Occupations: glider pilot, flight instructor

Irena Kempówna-Zabiełło (20 October 1920 - 17 June 2002) was a Polish glider pilot, record-breaking aviator and flight instructor.

== Early life and education ==
Irena Kempówna was born on 20 October 1920 in Warsaw, Poland. She grew up in the city, where she graduated from Krystyna Malczewska secondary school in 1938. She took up gliding in 1936 at the age of 16. During the Second World War she was a soldier in the Kedyw unit (Kierownictwo Dywersji Komendy Głównej Armii Krajowej), which August Emil Fieldorf founded as part of the Polish Home Army. Kempówna took part in the Warsaw Uprising.

== Flying career ==
Immediately after the end of the war, Kempówna trained as a flight instructor at the Cywilna Szkoła Pilotów i Mechaników (Civil School of Pilots and Mechanics). After passing the exam in July 1945, she soon began to train other flight instructors. She began competitive flying and between 1947 and 1950 she set thirteen Polish records for flight duration, flight length and maximum flight altitude and two world records for women. On 10 June 1948, Kempówna flew a 100-km triangle in the IS-1 Sęp (registration SP-549) and completed her first world record with an average speed of 50 km/h. On 12 November 1950, she flew a record 4963 metres high with fellow pilot Lucyna Wlazło in the IS-C Żuraw two-seater.

Kempówna studied architecture at the Politechnika Gdańska, where she became a member of Akademickie Koło Lotnicze, the university flying club. The club flew at Strzebielino near Wejherowo and at the airport in Wrzeszcz. In 1949, Kempówna was the first woman to win an international gliding competition in competition with men. At the Żar glider airfield near the village of Międzybrodzie Żywieckie, she outpaced experienced glider pilots and pilots who had flown in the war. The following year she came fourth in the poll for the Przegląd Sportowy (Polish Sportsperson of the Year) behind Helena Rakoczy, Emil Kiszka and Władysław Skonecki. From 1950 she was a member of the board of the Liga Lotnicza (Aviation League). Between 1950 and 1956, Kempówna was banned from flying for political reasons, as two members of her flying club had managed to escape to Sweden in a motorised plane in November 1950.

In 1952, she graduated from university as a trained architect and got married. She became the head of the Centralna Szkoła Szybowcowa Aeroklubu PRL (Central Gliding School of the Aeroclub of the People's Republic of Poland) in Leszno-Strzyżewice in 1957, which she turned into an international gliding centre. In 1957, the Polish National Championship was held there. In 1958 and 1968 it hosted the World Gliding Championships. In 1965, she initiated the last major expansion of the site with the construction of a control tower and café. In 1962, she travelled to Sweden with three other pilots on a promotional trip to showcase the Polish gliders SZD-22 Mucha Standard and SZD-24 Foka.

In 1966, Kempówna and her husband Roman Zabiełło obtained work contracts in Switzerland through the international trade company Centrala Handlu Zagranicznego Polservice and settled in Basel. Kempówna trained Swissair commercial pilots on the flight simulator there for many years. Her husband Roman Zabiełło worked as a pilot for Swissair, Balair and later Germanair.

== Personal life ==
Kempówna married pilot Roman Zabiełło in 1952 and they had a son.

Kempówna shared a lifelong friendship with fellow pilot Jadwiga Piłsudska (1920-2014), daughter of Polish Prime Minister Józef Piłsudski. Her friends also included the actress Barbara Ahrens-Młynarska.

Irena Kempówna-Zabiełło died after a long illness on 17 June 2002 in Basel. She was survived by her husband Roman Zabiełło (d. 2006) and a son. Her funeral took place on 28 June 2022 after a memorial service in St. Anna's Church in Wilanów.

== Awards ==
Kempówna was awarded Poland's Golden Cross of Merit and a number of Polish and international prizes. In 1959, she was the first Polish woman to receive the Paul Tissandier Diploma of Honour from the Fédération Aéronautique Internationale (FAI) "for exceptional contributions and achievements in sport aviation".
