= IS-2 Mucha =

Polish single-seat training glider, 1948

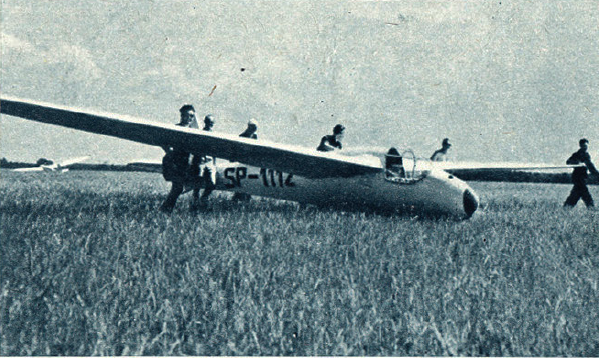

General information
- Type: Glider
- National origin: Poland
- Manufacturer: Jeżów Glider Workshop
- Designer: F. Kotowski and J. Kaniewska
- Number built: 137

History
- First flight: 24 April 1948
- Variants: -: SZD-12 Mucha 100; SZD-22 Mucha Standard

The IS-2 Mucha (Instytut Szybownictwa – gliding institute) was a single-seat training glider designed and built in Poland starting in 1947.

== Development ==
The IS-2 Mucha (Mucha – Fly) was designed to provide an intermediate solo trainer for the revived Polish gliding movement after World War II, along with the IS-1 Sęp advanced soaring and competition aircraft, IS-3 ABC primary trainer and IS-A Salamandra basic trainer. The Mucha and its developments gave the majority of Polish pilots the experience they required to get the best out of their gliders.

Construction was all-wood with plywood skinning for loaded areas and fabric covering for lightly loaded areas such as control surfaces and the wings aft of the main spars. The undercarriage consisted of a semi-recessed mainwheel and small skids under the nose and tail. The cockpit, covered by a built-up plexi-glas canopy was directly forward of the wing leading edge. Control surfaces were of standard wood and fabric construction with the ailerons fitted with external mass balances.

The first flight of the first prototype, (SP-561), took place at Bielsko on 24 April 1948, piloted by Ing. Peter Mynarskiego. Only relatively minor problems required rectification with changes to the instruments, airbrake actuation mechanism, improvements in cockpit sealing to reduce draughts and softer front skid damping rubber. Despite its training role the IS-2 had a reasonable performance and held two world records, as well as giving pilots a glider capable of FAI Diamond badge flights, and gain experience of cloud flying. Record flights included:-

- Andrzej Ziemiański (1953r.) - Straight distance, 615 km.
- Jan Gawęckiego (1957) – Straight distance, 637 km.
- Rudolf Kopernok – Out and return, 500 km (Katowice -Leszno-Katowice).

Production of the IS-2 started with the IS-2 Mucha bis of which 20 were built, and continued with the IS-2 Mucha ter, of which 116 were built. Later variants with much improved features include the SZD-12 Mucha 100 and the SZD-22 Mucha Standard, as well as the SZD-7 Osa which incorporated an experimental laminar flow wing with a 'Mucha ter' fuselage for research purposes.

== Variants ==
- IS-2 Mucha – the prototype Mucha (regn. no. SP-561)
- IS-2 Mucha-bis – the first production model starting with SP-887, first flown on 21 May 1949, 20 built.
- IS-2 Mucha-ter – the second production model starting with SP-1046, first flown on 10 July 1950, 116 built.
- SZD-7 Osa - The SZD-7 Osa was based on the IS-2 Mucha, with a laminar flow aerofoil section developed by T. Tadeus Kosti. Little information on laminar flow aerofoils was available but Kosti was able to design the aerofoil for the SZD-7 Osa to achieve laminar flow to at least 18% chord. As well as the laminar flow wings the 'Osa' introduced the SZD plate style airbrakes, which were installed aft of the mainspar. The first flight of the 'Osa' took place at Bielsko airfield piloted by Adam Zientek.

== Specifications (IS-2 Mucha) ==
Data from http://www.piotrp.de/SZYBOWCE/pis2.htm

General characteristics

- Crew: 1
- Length: 6.8 m (22 ft 3.5 in)
- Wingspan: 15 m (49 ft 2.5 in)
- Height: 1.6 m (5 ft 3 in)
- Wing area: 15 m^{2} (161.5 sq ft)
- Aspect ratio: 15:1
- Airfoil: Göttingen 549 > M12
- Empty weight: 170 kg (375 lb)
- Gross weight: 260 kg (573 lb)

Performance

- Maximum speed: 225 km/h (134 mph, 121.5 kn)
- Stall speed: 40 km/h (25 mph, 21.5 kn)
- g limits: +4.5 / -3 g
- Maximum glide ratio: 23 at 63 km/h (34 kts / 39 mph)
- Rate of sink: 0.68 m/s (134 ft/min) at 55 km/h (30 kts / 34 mph)

== See also ==
Aircraft of comparable role, configuration, and era

- Letov LF-107 Luňák
- Scheibe Spatz
- Slingsby T.25 Gull 4

Related lists

- List of gliders
