= IS-3 ABC =

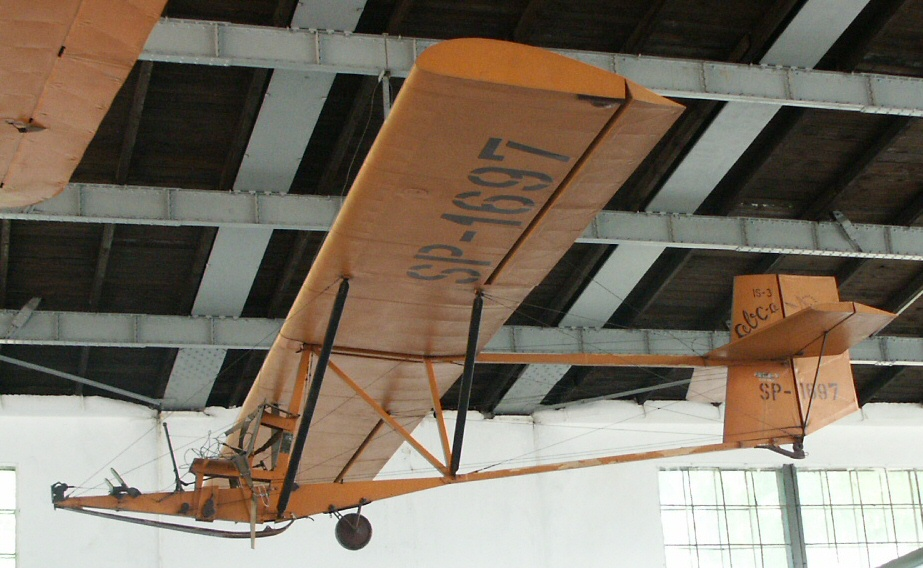
- IS-3 ABC-A in the Polish Aviation Museum

General information
- Type: Glider
- National origin: Poland
- Manufacturer: Instytut Szybownictwa
- Number built: 256

History
- Introduction date: 1948
- First flight: 31 December 1947
- Retired: 1961

The IS-3 ABC (Instytut Szybownictwa – Gliding Institute) was a single-seat training glider designed and built in Poland from 1947.

== Development ==
From 1946 the IS (Gliding Institute) started work on designing gliders to rebuild the shattered by the war Polish gliding movement. Four types were required:

1. School (IS-3 ABC)
2. Transition (IS-A Salamandra)
3. Training and intermediate performance (IS-2 Mucha)
4. High performance / advanced (IS-1 Sęp)

To fulfil the 'School' requirement the IS-3 ABC primary glider was designed by Rudolf Matz and Roman Zatwarnicki, and built at the workshops in Bielsko.

Using the sole remaining W.W.S.1 Salamandra as a starting point, the IS-3 ABC emerged looking similar to most primary gliders, with a high set rectangular low aspect ratio wing, wire-braced to an open structure wire-braced fuselage, which did nothing more than connect the seat, skid and tail unit to the wings.

The IS-3 ABC prototype first flew on New Year's Eve of 1948 by Peter Mynarski and after successful trials, a production commenced as the IS-3 ABC-bis. Further improvements resulted in the IS-3 ABC-ter, with a cabin and windscreen for the pilot. Last and most numerous variant was ABC-A of 1955, produced in 1956–57. 256 of all variants were manufactured in workshops in Bielsko (of IS, later SZD), Krosno and Lubawka (according to other publications, 280, including 74 bis, 30 ter and 176 A).

Polish instructors were also instrumental in boosting the gliding movement in the People's Republic of China, providing instruction and advice with the 50 IS-3 ABC A's exported there. This variant was modified with less dihedral (1°), to allow the generally shorter Chinese students to hold the wings level for take-off. After flight trials in Poland, it was confirmed that it did not appreciably affect the handling. The Chinese also manufactured these gliders on the licence.

The IS-3 ABC series was in use at Polish state gliding clubs up to 1961, when the dual training syllabus was finally introduced. Many of the IS-3 primary gliders were dispersed to schools and clubs for use as training aids, some of which survive as exhibits in museums today.

== Variants ==
- IS-3 ABC – The sole prototype aircraft without folding wings.
- IS-3 ABC bis – production aircraft with reduced wing incidence, increased aileron movement and with folding wings and tail-unit (24 made in IS and 50 in Lubawka).
- IS-3 ABC ter – version equipped with a removable cockpit nacelle and windscreen as well as fixed wings and tail-unit (30 made in Lubawka)
- IS-3 ABC-A – last production version, with less wing dihedral, produced in 1956-57 (most in Krosno).

== Specifications (IS-3 ABC-A) ==
Data from http://www.piotrp.de/SZYBOWCE/pis3.htm

General characteristics

- Crew: 1
- Length: 6.27 m (20 ft 7 in)
- Wingspan: 9.0 m (29 ft 6 in)
- Height: 1.72 m (5 ft 7 in)
- Wing area: 13.5 m^{2} (145.3 sq ft)
- Aspect ratio: 6:1
- Airfoil: Peyret 16%
- Empty weight: 105 kg (231.5 lb)
- Gross weight: 185 kg (408 lb)

Performance

- Maximum speed: 135 km/h (84 mph, 73 kn)
- Stall speed: 45 km/h (28 mph, 24 kn)
- Maximum glide ratio: 9.2 at 53 km/h (29 kts/33 mph)
- Rate of sink: 1.5 m/s (295 ft/min) at 48 km/h (26 kts/30 mph)

== See also ==
- W.W.S.1 Salamandra
- Slingsby Primary
- Lippisch Zögling
