= Type 34 =

Type 34 may refer to:

- Volkswagen Type 34, a variant of the Volkswagen Karmann Ghia
- Bugatti Type 34 U-16, a car produced by Bugatti
- Slingsby Sky (Slingsby Type 34 Sky), a high performance single seat competition sailplane
- Type 34, USAF reporting name for Beriev Be-6, a Soviet flying boat
