= IS-1 Sęp =

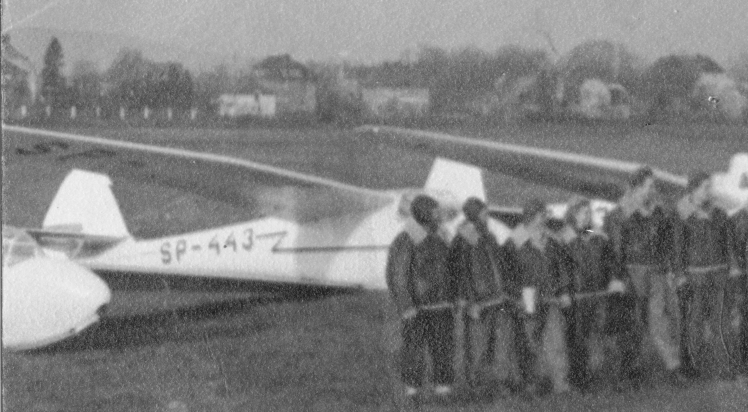
- IS-1 Sęp prototype (SP-443)

General information
- Type: Glider
- National origin: Poland
- Manufacturer: Glider Workshop in Jeżów Sudecki
- Designer: Instytut Szybownictwa
- Number built: 6

History
- First flight: 2 June 1947

The IS-1 Sęp was a single-seat high-performance glider designed and built in Poland from 1947. It was the first post-war Polish glider.

== Development ==
The IS-1 Sęp (Vulture) was designed in Instytut Szybownictwa (Gliding Institute) as part of the effort to re-invigorate Polish gliding after World War II, which included the IS-2 Mucha for training and medium performance, IS-A Salamandra transition solo trainer and IS-3 ABC primary trainer. An initial design was developed by Władysław Nowakowski and Józef Niespał.

The first flight, piloted by Piotr Mynarski, took place on 2 June 1947, but nearly ended in disaster as the ailerons were cross-connected. Mynarski abandoned the launch and landed safely. The Sęp was cleared for cloud flying, high speeds and basic aerobatics with comparable performance with foreign contemporaries such as the DFS Weihe and its derivative the Slingsby T.34 Sky. Tests were satisfactory and the prototype (markings SP-443) was taken to the international glider meet held at Samedan, Switzerland in July 1947. The glider met with an interest there, being one of the first new postwar designs, and Adam Zientek achieved eighth place, winning a speed task on a closed circuit.

Results of flight tests and reports from pilots prompted modifications to the airbrakes, increased dihedral and increased aileron range of movement as well as a more compact cockpit. A production model was named IS-1 Sęp bis. Three production IS-1 Sęp bis aircraft, and an IS-2 Mucha, were entered in the 1948 International Gliding Championship at Samedan in 1948, but were withdrawn when the Polish team was withdrawn for political reasons. Competition success came in the 1948 7th Polish National Gliding championships, taking the first three places, and many Polish national records were broken in Sęps, including the International Feminine Record for speed round a 100 km triangle set by Irena Kempówna on 10 June 1948. On 1 April 1948 A. Zientek set a record of duration 18 hours 23 min; in July 1947 I. Kempówna, A. Zientek and R. Matz flew two Sęps and a Mucha 270 km from Żar to Vienna; in December 1948 I. Kempówna set a record of 3720 m height gain; on 9 May 1949 A. Zientek flew 100 km triangle at 28.7 km/h; on 10 June 1948 I. Kempówna flew a 100 km triangle at 50 km/h for a Polish national and world record. On 23 July 1950 Tadeusz Góra achieved 5,737 m altitude (5038 m height gain); on 22 July 1950 A. Zientek flew out and return 232 km for a Polish record; on 11 May 1950 Tadeusz Góra flew a 100 km triangle at 52.63 km/h; on 23 April 1953 J. Popiel flew a 100 km triangle at 68.52 km/h.

The IS-1 Sęp was constructed of wood throughout with steel for high-stress areas and fittings. The fuselage was a plywood-covered semi-monocoque structure with smooth lines. Incorporated in the fuselage was the cockpit, which was covered by a built-up plexi-glass canopy, and an integral fin which supported the plywood stressed-skin tailplane just above the fuselage top decking level. The undercarriage consisted of a long pneumatically-sprung ash skid under the nose and a rubber-sprung tail skid. For take-off a jettisonable two-wheeled dolly was attached to the front skid. As with all drop-off dollies it was important to release the dolly at the right moment to avoid the dolly bouncing into the structure, causing damage. An aero-tow hook was provided in the extreme nose, as well as a bungee hook and twin winch-launch hooks either side of the fuselage.

The cantilever gulled wings followed normal practice with a plywood-covered torsion box leading edge, mainspar, ribs and false rear spar to support the full-span flaps and ailerons. DFS-style airbrakes were fitted at the rear of the mainspar with the upper plates hinging forwards and the lower plates hinging rearwards. A comprehensive instrument panel was fitted in the cockpit which included:-A large plaque on the instrument panel; AirSpeed Indicator (8), Vertical Speed Indicator to 5 m/s, Vertical Speed Indicator to 15 m/s, an artificial horizon with slip ball, altimeter, longitudinal clinometer, stopwatch, compass and oxygen pressure gauge (oxygen equipment was housed behind the pilots seat).

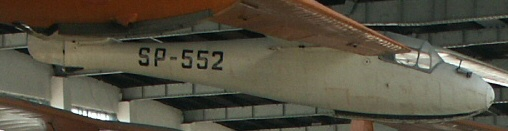
IS-1 Sęp bis at the Polish Aviation Museum

Six IS-1 Sęps were built, including a prototype, with several continuing to fly into the 1960s with one surviving at the Polish Aviation Museum in Kraków.

== Variants ==
- IS-1 Sęp – The sole prototype SP-443, (Fabr no. : 006).
- IS-1 Sęp bis – Five production models with new airbrakes, increased dihedral and greater aileron range of movement. Registration numbers: SP-549 - SP-553.

== Specifications (IS-1 Sęp bis) ==
Data from http://www.piotrp.de/SZYBOWCE/pis1.htm

General characteristics

- Crew: 1
- Length: 7.5 m (24 ft 7 in)
- Wingspan: 17.5 m (57 ft 5 in)
- Height: 1.25 m (4 ft 1 in)
- Wing area: 17 m^{2} (183 sq ft)
- Aspect ratio: 18 :1
- Airfoil: Göttingen 549 > M12
- Empty weight: 276 kg (608.5 lb)
- Gross weight: 353 kg (778 lb)

Performance

- Maximum speed: 225 km/h (134 mph, 121.5 kn)
- Stall speed: 40 km/h (25 mph, 22 kn)
- Maximum glide ratio: 27:1 at 72 km/h (39 kts/45 mph)
- Rate of sink: 0.68 m/s (134 ft/min) at 67 km/h (36 kts/42 mph)

== See also ==
Aircraft of comparable role, configuration, and era

- Slingsby Type 34 Sky
- DFS Weihe
