= Lucyna Wlazło-Bajewska Krzywonos =

Polish glider pilot and gliding instructor

- Instructing in 1951 on how to loop de loop in a glider
- Born: Teodora Lucyna Wlazło; 1 October 1928
- Died: 26 January 2007 (aged 78); Łomianki
- Occupation: glider pilot

Teodora Lucyna Wlazło-Bajewska Krzywonos (known as Lucyna Wlazło for the early part of her competitive career) (1 October 1928 – 26 January 2007) was a Polish glider pilot and gliding instructor. She set 6 world records and 11 national records.

== Early life and learning to fly ==
Teodora Lucyna Wlazło was born on 1 October 1928 and grew up in Białystok.

In 1947 Wlazło completed a gliding course organised in Leszczewie by the Związek Harcerstwa Polskiego (ZHP) (the Polish Scouting and Guiding Association) at the same time as fellow glider pilot Zofia Zalewska who also came from Białystok. She was a member of the Białystok Aeroclub, and later the Aeroklub Warszawski (Warsaw Aero Club).

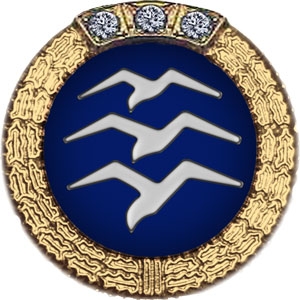
FAI Gliding Commission Diamond Badge.

In 1951 she appeared in a film where she was teaching glider pilots at the Warsaw Aero Club on how to loop de loop.

== Record breaking glider flights ==
12 November 1950, she flew a record 4963 metres high with fellow pilot Irena Kempówna in a IS-C Żuraw two-seater.

28 July 1951, Wlazło set the national Polish gliding record in a target flight of 123 wkm.

18 July 1958 she set two world records in target and open flight in a two-seater glider totalling 489.8 km at the international competition in Leszno.

18 July 1958, she set a world record in target flight of 489.80 km, taking off together with Krystyna Cieślik as her crew in a SZD Bocian.

26 June 1960 she set a world record in target-return flight of 387 km.

18 May 1966 she won the national Polish women's gliding competition.

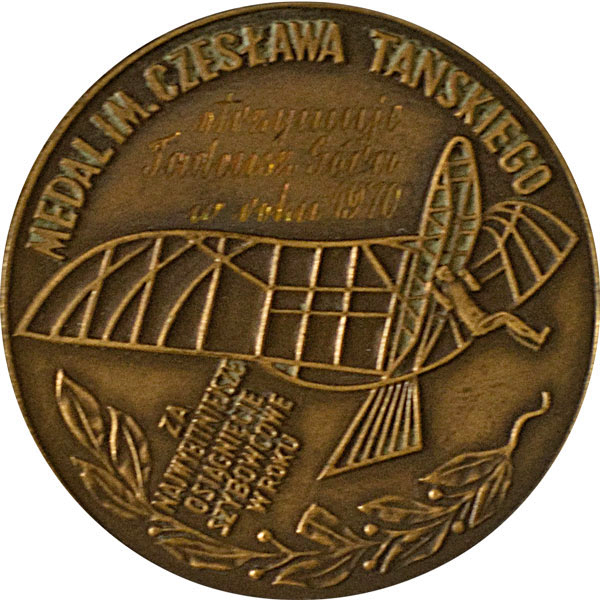
Face of the Tanski Medal

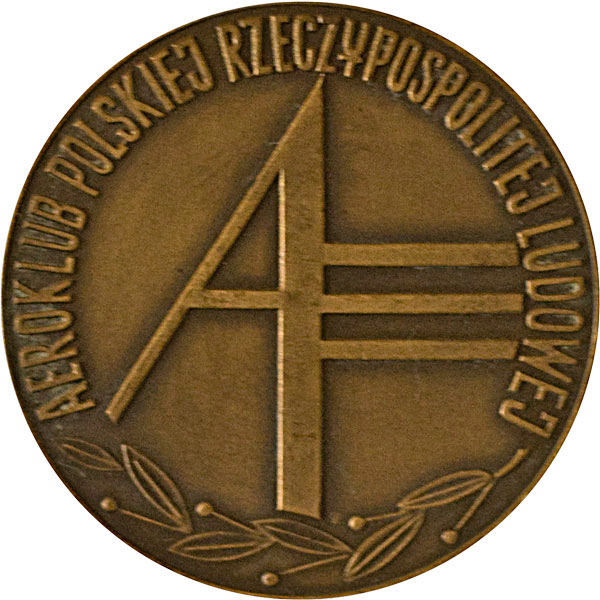
Reverse of the Tanski Medal

4 July 1969, she won the women's Polish national gliding competition.

== Personal life ==
Lucyna Wlazło married and took the surname Wlazło-Bajewska Krzywonos, and had a son Tadeusz Bajewski. She continued to fly until 2005.

Lucyna Wlazło-Bajewska Krzywonos died on 26 January 2007 in Łomianki.

== Awards and honours ==
- 1960 Diamentowa Odznaka Szybowcowa Nr. 54 (159) (Diamond Gliding Badge No. 54 (159)) awarded to pilots who fly 300 km to a pre-defined goal, go 500 km in one flight (but not necessarily to a pre-defined goal), and gain 5,000 m in height. Earning all three "diamonds" qualifies the pilot for the FAI registry as a Diamond Badge holder.
- 1969 Medal Tańskiego (pl.)
- 2002 Dominika Medal (awarded to the woman pilot of the year, created by Dominik Orczykowski, a Capuchin friar and chaplain to Polish aviators).
