= Czerwiński Sparrow =

Single seat Canadian glider, 1942

General information
- Type: Single seat basic training and soaring glider
- National origin: Canada
- Designer: Wacław Czerwiński

History
- First flight: August or September 1942
- Developed from: W.W.S.1 Salamandra

The Czerwiński Sparrow, sometimes known as the de Havilland Canada glider, was a single seat glider, designed and built by a group of de Haviiland engineers in Canada in 1942. It was intended to popularise gliding and be suitable for both basic training and thermal soaring.

== Design and development ==
In the early years of World War II there was little gliding activity in Canada. Feeling that a Gliding Club would be well received by the military, and with the approval of their employers, some staff at the de Havilland Aircraft Company of Canada decided to form their own. The initiative was taken by W. Czerwinski who went on to lead the design of the group's own glider, a very close copy of the W.W.S.1 Salamandra which Czerwiński had designed before the war in Poland. Members of the drawing office worked in their own time to produce the engineering blueprints, de Havilland and other companies took an interest, assisting the project with donations of instruments and a landing wheel.

The design aim was to produce an aircraft which could be used both as basic trainer (primary glider) and as a sailplane capable of exploiting the strong thermals of the Toronto region. The docile handling of a typical primary glider, particularly in the stall, had to be maintained alongside a better lift to drag performance than most of that class. It was a high wing aircraft, with a single spar wing with rounded tips, straight taper on the outer ⅔ of the span and a constant chord centre section. The wings were ply covered from the leading edge to the main spar and fabric covered aft. The wings carried some dihedral and there was washout, a decrease in angle of incidence outwards along the span, on the outer panels to avoid spin initiation at the stall. Generous differential ailerons, also fabric covered, ran from the wingtips over most of the outer, tapered panels. The wing was mounted on a fuselage pedestal above and immediately behind the cockpit in the flat sided forward fuselage. Though open, this cockpit enclosed the pilot as in a light aircraft, rather than leaving him fully exposed as on many earlier primary gliders. A pair of lift struts joined the main spar to the lower fuselage longerons.

Behind the wing trailing edge the enclosed fuselage was replaced by a pair of nearly horizontal beams, one vertically above the other, which carried the tail unit. The ply-covered tailplane and fabric covered elevators were mounted on the upper fuselage beam. Fin and rudder, ply and fabric covered respectively, continued down below the horizontal surfaces to the lower beam, the rudder moving in an elevator cut-out. Like the wing, the tailplane was strut braced from below. The rear surfaces were braced against lateral deflections by pairs of wires from the upper wing surfaces to the top of the fin and by similar wires from below to its bottom.

The undercarriage consisted of a keel skid which ended about midway below the wing, where a single wheel was partially exposed. There was a tailskid and wire loops at the wing tips to protect them and ease ground handling.

The Czerwiński Sparrow flew for the first time in late August or early September 1942, aero-towed by a Tiger Moth. Released at 1,380 ft (420 m), it reached an altitude of 5,800 ft (1,770 m) during a 2 hr test flight.

== Operational history ==
The Sparrow was operated by the de Havilland Glider Club at Downsview, Ontario, initially without a registration, being registered as CF-ZAI on 10 June 1947. In 1948 it was donated to the Toronto Gliding Club, and was wrecked in an accident at Oshawa Airport on 4 June 1950.

== Variants ==
W.W.S.1 Salamandra
The original aircraft designed and built in Poland by Wacław Czerwiński at the Wojskowe Warsztaty Szybowcowe - Military Glider Workshops.
Czerwiński Sparrow
Designed and built in Canada by Wacław Czerwiński and employees at the de Havilland Canada factory in Toronto during WWII, after Czerwiński had escaped Poland at the outbreak of war.
Czerwiński Robin
A modified version of the Sparrow designed and built in Canada.

== Specifications (Czerwiński Robin) ==
Data from The World's Sailplanes:Die Segelflugzeuge der Welt:Les Planeurs du Monde Volume II

General characteristics

- Crew: 1
- Length: 5.8 m (19 ft 0 in)
- Wingspan: 11.35 m (37 ft 3 in)
- Wing area: 15.68 m^{2} (168.8 sq ft)
- Aspect ratio: 8.2
- Airfoil: Sikorski G.S.1
- Empty weight: 120 kg (265 lb)
- Gross weight: 214 kg (472 lb)

Performance

- Stall speed: 41 km/h (25 mph, 22 kn)
- Never exceed speed: 161 km/h (100 mph, 87 kn)
- Rough air speed max: 161 km/h (100.0 mph; 86.9 kn)
- Aerotow speed: 161 km/h (100.0 mph; 86.9 kn)
- Winch launch speed: 93.8 km/h (58.3 mph; 50.6 kn)
- Maximum glide ratio: 16.4 at 55 km/h (34.2 mph; 29.7 kn)
- Rate of sink: 0.823 m/s (162.0 ft/min) at 51.4 km/h (31.9 mph; 27.8 kn)
- Wing loading: 13.65 kg/m^{2} (2.80 lb/sq ft)
