= Slingsby Sky =

British single-seat glider, 1950

Sky
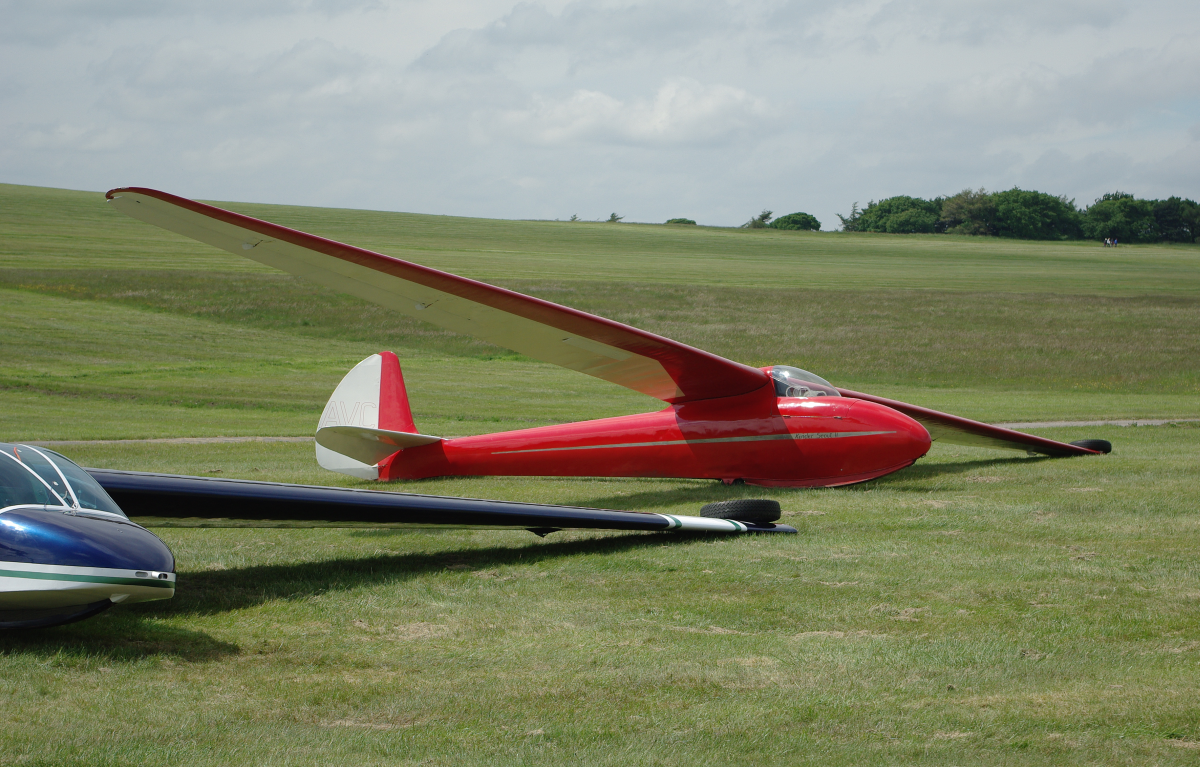

General information
- Type: Single seat competition sailplane
- National origin: United Kingdom
- Manufacturer: Slingsby Sailplanes Ltd., Kirkbymoorside, Yorkshire
- Designer: F. N. Slingsby
- Number built: 16

History
- First flight: September 1950

The Slingsby Type 34 Sky is a high performance single seat competition sailplane built in the United Kingdom. It was successful in major events, particularly in the World Gliding Championships of 1952.

== Design and development ==
The single seat Slingsby Sky resulted from Slingsby's experience at the 1948 International Gliding Contests, where they flew their 15 m span Gull IV. This convinced them that to be competitive against aircraft like the German DFS Weihe, the Gull's successor would need a span of 18 m or more. Consequently, the Sky was aerodynamically identical to the Gull IV apart from span (and hence aspect ratio) and length, though it differed in construction. It dominated the 1952 Contests and was well placed in both 1954 and 1956.

The Sky is a wooden aircraft, using the traditional spruce for stressed members and birch ply elsewhere. Its wing has a constant chord inner section over the first 30% of span, then tapers on both edges to a rounded tip. The 20% increase in span over the Gull IV was achieved with two extra rib bays in the inner part and a 2 in (51 mm) increase in rib separation outboard. The Sky was designed to meet semi-aerobatic requirements which together with an aspect ratio of 18.7, which was high for the time, required the single box spars, 6 in (152 mm) wide at their greatest, to be massive. Their weight is 25% of that of the whole aircraft. The wing ahead of this spar, positioned at 30% chord, forms a plywood covered torsion box. Behind it, the wing is fabric covered. Ailerons, divided to allow for wing flexure, fill the tapered trailing edges. Air brakes are mounted on the spars as aerodynamically balanced pairs above and below wing; the lower panel open into the airstream and lever the upper ones against it. There were no flaps.

The cockpit of the Sky is of standard Slingsby design and built on the same jigs as those used on the Gull IV and Kite II, with a single piece perspex canopy hinged on the starboard side. It is placed immediately in front of the leading edge of the wing and the fuselage neck on which the wing is mounted. Behind the cockpit the fuselage is a semi-monocoque structure, with a stress bearing 1/16 in (1.6 mm) plywood skin formed over light frames positioned by three longitudinal stringers. There is additional strengthening around the wheel bay, where the single wheel has its axle held clear of the fuselage by small triangular pieces. An ash skid is mounted away from the fuselage, running forward to the nose. The wheel brake is applied at the greatest air brake extension. As a weight saving alternative to the mono-wheel, a jettisonable two wheel dolly can be used for take-off. Another ash skid at the rear forms a bumper. The tail unit was initially identical to that of the Gull IV: the tailplane has a ply covered leading edge and fabric behind, mounted forward of the ply covered fin so that the rudder hinge is in line with the trailing edge of the single piece, fabric covered elevator. The latter carries trim tabs.

The Sky first flew in September 1950. Trials led to readjustment of the centre of gravity and the replacement of the Gull IV rudder with an aerodynamically balanced one of greater chord. The airbrakes were also increased in area and their linkage revised to ensure the Sky did not exceed its design terminal speed in dives, and to make the brakes easier to close at higher speeds.

Slingsby designed an improved version of the Sky, designated Type 34B Sky 2 for the 1954 World Competition, but did not build it. It would have had laminar flow wings with square tips and a revised, squared off tail.

== Operational history ==
The prototype Sky was one of the exhibits at the Festival of Britain held in May 1951.

The first two Skys had immediate success in 1951 in the English championships held at Camphill, Derbyshire, coming in first and second. More significant was their dominance of the World Gliding Championships held the following year at Madrid in Spain. Eight Skys were entered, five by the British team, two by Argentina and one by the Netherlands. One British Sky was forced to retire after the first day, but Final placings put all seven remaining Skys in the top fourteen out of thirty-nine, and they claimed first, third and fourth places. Skys continued to do well in later Championships, with second place in both 1954 and 1956.

A Swiss Sky was flown across the Alps from Bern to Béziers in France in 1955 by Hans Nietlispach, a distance of 536.2 km (333.2 mi) which still stands as the Swiss straight line record.

== Variants ==
T.34A Sky 1
Sixteen aircraft built ostensibly to compete in World Gliding championships of the late 1940s and early 1950s.
T.34B Sky 2
Designed for the 1954 World Championships, the Sky 2 featured NACA 5-figure aerofoil sections, with square cut wing-tips and tail unit, but was not built.

== Surviving aircraft ==
Sixteen Skys were built; of these, six still fly in the UK, including the Swiss record holder, and one in the Netherlands; two others are under restoration. One Sky (EC-RAT) is a non-flying exhibit in the Museo del Aire (Spain).

== Specifications ==
Data from Ellison 1971, p. 203, The World's Sailplanes:Die Segelflugzeuge der Welt:Les Planeurs du Monde

General characteristics

- Crew: 1
- Length: 25 ft 4.6 in (7.738 m) . Before the rudder alterations, the length was 24 ft 10.8 in (7.590 m)
- Wingspan: 59 ft 1 in (18.00 m)
- Wing area: 187.0 sq ft (17.37 m^{2})
- Aspect ratio: 18.7
- Airfoil: Göttingen 549 at root, NACA 2R_{2} 12 at tip
- Empty weight: 550 lb (249.5 kg)
- Max takeoff weight: 800 lb (362.9 kg)

Performance

- Stall speed: 29 kn (34 mph, 54 km/h)
- Never exceed speed: 98 kn (113 mph, 182 km/h)
- Rough air speed max: 72 kn (133.3 km/h; 82.9 mph)
- Aerotow speed: 56 kn (103.7 km/h; 64.4 mph)
- Winch launch speed: 44 kn (81.5 km/h; 50.6 mph)
- g limits: +5 -2.5 at 61.5 kn (113.9 km/h; 70.8 mph)
- Maximum glide ratio: 1:27.5 at 37.5 kn (69.5 km/h; 43.2 mph)
- Rate of sink: 120 ft/min (0.61 m/s) at 33.5 kn (62.0 km/h; 38.6 mph)
- Wing loading: 4.3 lb/sq ft (20.9 kg/m^{2})

== See also ==
Aircraft of comparable role, configuration, and era

- DFS Weihe
- IS-1 Sęp

Related lists List of gliders
