= SZD-12 Mucha 100 =

Polish single-seat glider, 1953

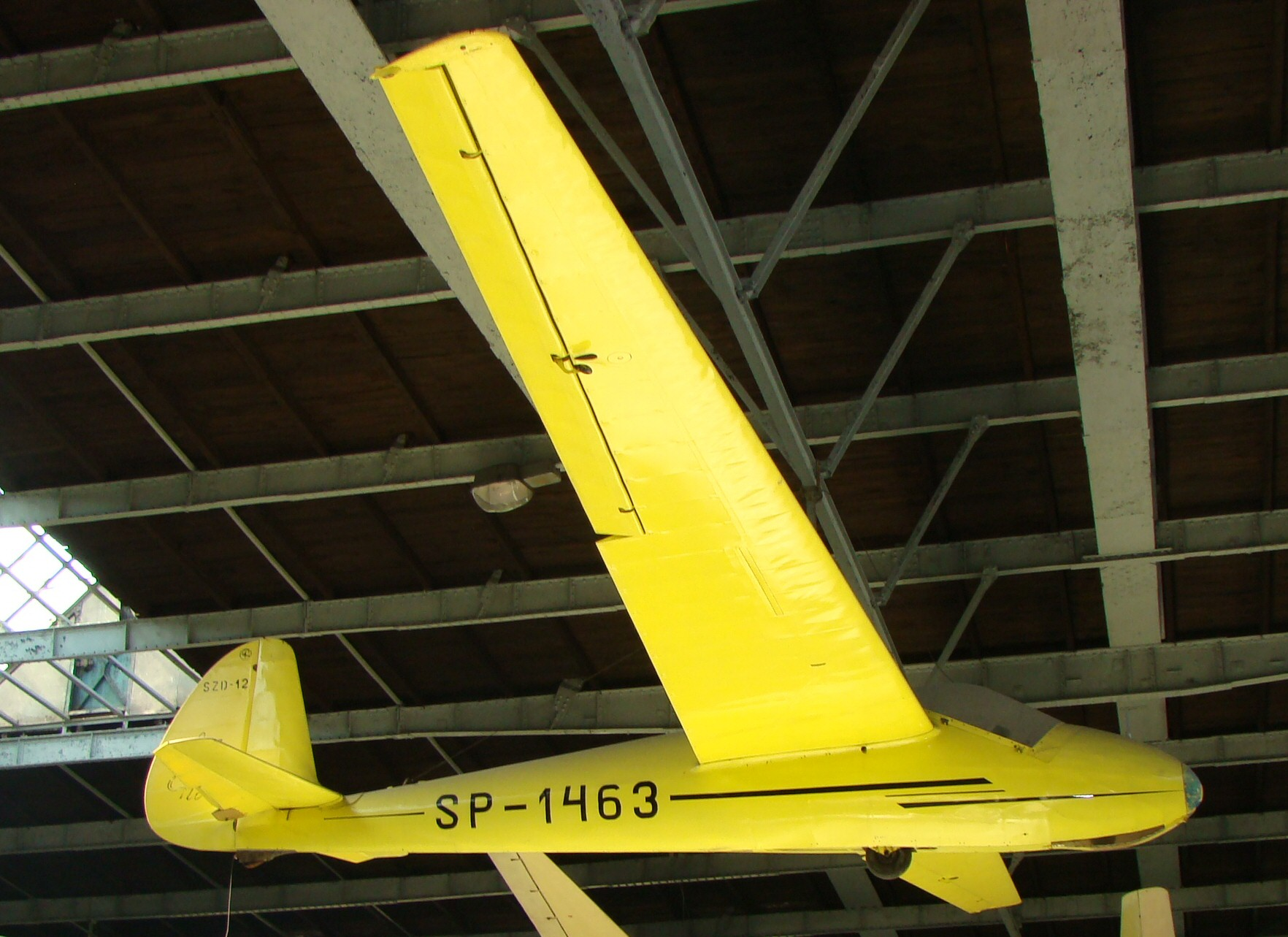
- SZD-12 Mucha 100 at the Polish Aviation Museum

General information
- Type: Glider aircraft
- National origin: Poland
- Manufacturer: glider production works (ZSLS) in Krosno, Gdańsk and Wrocław
- Designer: SZD
- Primary user: Polish aero clubs
- Number built: 290 + Chinese production

History
- First flight: 14 November 1953
- Developed from: IS-2 Mucha
- Variant: SZD-22 Mucha Standard

The SZD-12 Mucha 100 (Szybowcowy Zakład Doświadczalny - Glider Experimental Works) was a single-seat glider aircraft that was designed and built in Poland from 1953.

== Development ==
The SZD-12 Mucha (Fly) 100 was derived from the IS-2 Mucha-ter for use by aero clubs throughout Poland. Two hundred and ninety were built with 73 exported to several countries and an unknown number were licence-built in the People's Republic of China (PRC).

Constructed entirely from wood and plywood, the Mucha 100 represented a significant improvement over the IS-2 Mucha, featuring smoother surfaces, improved aerodynamics, and a more comprehensive suite of instruments and equipment. These included a KF-18 oxygen system, cockpit lighting, and instrumentation suitable for cloud flying. Pilot comfort was enhanced by a slightly reclined seatback and increased legroom, while visibility was improved through the adoption of a larger, one-piece cockpit canopy.

Schempp-Hirth style airbrakes replaced the DFS style airbrakes of the IS-2, external mass balances fitted to the ailerons cured the tendency to flutter. The wing incidence was reduced to 2° to better align the fuselage with the airflow at higher speeds, reducing drag. Main designer was Władysław Okarmus, constructors were Jan Dyrek and Zbigniew Badura. The prototype was made in ZSLS No.5 in Krosno - it was the only prototype of SZD design that was not made in the SZD works in Bielsko.

Flight trials commenced on 14 November 1953 in Krosno (first flight by Adam Zientek); a tendency to control surface flutter was resolved by mass balancing. After this and other improvements, the Mucha 100 was cleared for production as the SZD-12 Mucha 100. From 1954, 256 were built in ZSLS in Krosno, 14 in Gdańsk and 20 in Wrocław.

Further improvements were incorporated into the SZD-12A Mucha 100A, which had the external mass balances replaced by weights in the leading edges of the ailerons, forward of the hinges. Another modification which was also applied retrospectively to earlier units was a re-located mainwheel, moved rearwards to reduce the weight on the tailwheel during ground handling.

70 Mucha 100's were exported, mostly to the USSR, DDR, Italy, Switzerland and China in multiple orders; single examples were also exported to Austria, France, Finland and India.

== Variants ==
- SZD-12 Mucha 100 – initial production version, 104 built
- SZD-12A Mucha 100A – modified version with altered undercarriage arrangement and internal aileron mass balances, 186 built from 1958

== Specifications (SZD-12 Mucha 100) ==
Data from http://www.piotrp.de/SZYBOWCE/pszd12.htmThe World's Sailplanes:Die Segelflugzeuge der Welt:Les Planeurs du Monde

General characteristics

- Crew: 1
- Length: 7.0 m (23 ft 0 in)
- Wingspan: 15 m (49 ft 3 in)
- Height: 1.6 m (5 ft 3 in)
- Wing area: 15 m^{2} (161 sq ft)
- Aspect ratio: 15
- Airfoil: NACA 43012A
- Empty weight: 195 kg (430 lb)
- Gross weight: 290 kg (639 lb)

Performance

- Maximum speed: 220 km/h (137 mph, 119 kn)
- Stall speed: 55 km/h (34 mph, 30 kn)
- g limits: +5.25 -2.62 at 250 km/h (160 mph; 130 kn)
- Maximum glide ratio: 24 at 70 km/h (43 mph; 38 kn)
- Rate of sink: 0.76 m/s (150 ft/min) at 62 km/h (39 mph, 33 kn)

== See also ==
Aircraft of comparable role, configuration, and era

- Slingsby Skylark 2
