= SZD-22 Mucha Standard =

Polish single-seat aerobatic glider, 1957

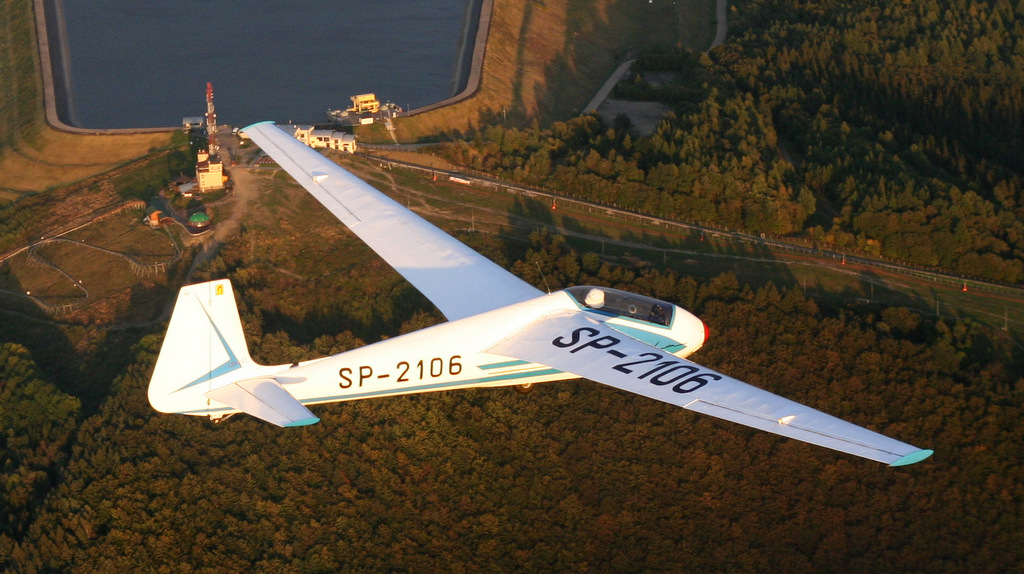

General information
- Type: Glider
- National origin: Poland
- Manufacturer: SZD
- Designer: W. Nowakowski, R. Grzywacz and Zatwarnicki
- Primary user: Polish Aero Club
- Number built: 288

History
- First flight: 10 February 1958
- Developed from: SZD-12 Mucha 100

The SZD-22 Mucha Standard (Szybowcowy Zakład Doświadczalny – Glider Experimental Works) was a single-seat aerobatic glider designed and built in Poland from 1957.

== Development ==
Developed especially for the 1958 World Gliding Championships, the SZD-22 Mucha Standard was a direct descendant of the IS-2 Mucha (Fly), from 1948, and SZD-12 Mucha 100, from 1953, with very similar lines and dimensions. The Mucha Standard was designed to the new Standard class rules which discarded the old Olympic 15-15-15 Span, Aspect Ratio, Area rule.

The first flight of the SZD-22 took place at Bielsko with Adam Zientek at the controls on 10 February 1958. It was followed by the second prototype in June 1958. Flight trials were successful, leading to a long production run with six variants, which introduced various modifications.

Built primarily of wood, the SZD-22 had airbrakes in the wings, a streamline cockpit canopy, short nose and tail skids with a single mainwheel. The SZD-22C model replaced the plywood covering of the wings with fabric and some models had provision for water ballast in rubber bags fitted to the wing roots. Most of SZD-22s – 271, were built in ZSLS in Krosno.

Many SZD-22's, mostly SZD-22C models, were exported to the Great Britain, Argentina, Austria, Australia, Belgium, Denmark, Finland, France, Greece, Yugoslavia, Mexico, Norway, West Germany, Switzerland, Sweden, Tunisia, Turkey, USA, Hungary and Italy Adam Witek flew the SZD-22 Mucha Standard to first place in the Standard class at the 1958 World Gliding Championships at Leszno in Poland.

== Variants ==
- SZD-22 Mucha Standard – The initial prototype of the SZD-22 series (reg'n no. SP-1748).
- SZD-22A Mucha Standard – Initial production version, 8 built in Bielsko.
- SZD-22B Mucha Standard – Provision for water ballast in rubber bags, 40 built in Krosno.
- SZD-22C Mucha Standard – Fabric covered wings + provision for water ballast in rubber bags, main production variant.
- SZD-22D Mucha Standard – Modified skid and mainwheel (1 built).
- SZD-22E Mucha Standard – Variant with a new wing (1 built).

== Specifications (SZD-22A Mucha Standard) ==
Data from The World's Sailplanes:Die Segelflugzeuge der Welt:Les Planeurs du Monde Volume II SZD-22 Mucha Standard

General characteristics

- Crew: 1
- Length: 7 m (23 ft 0 in)
- Wingspan: 14.98 m (49 ft 2 in)
- Height: 1.6 m (5 ft 3 in)
- Wing area: 12.75 m^{2} (137.2 sq ft)
- Aspect ratio: 17.65
- Airfoil: Root: Göttingen 549, Tip: M 12
- Empty weight: 219 kg (483 lb)
- Gross weight: 350 kg (772 lb)
- Max takeoff weight: 383 kg (844 lb) SZD-22B and SZD-22C with water ballast

Performance

- Stall speed: 59 km/h (37 mph, 32 kn)
- Never exceed speed: 250 km/h (160 mph, 130 kn)
- Rough air speed max: 140 km/h (87 mph; 76 kn)
- Aerotow speed: 150 km/h (93 mph; 81 kn)
- g limits: +6 -3 at 144 km/h (89 mph; 78 kn)
- Maximum glide ratio: 27.8 at 75 km/h (47 mph; 40 kn)
- Rate of sink: 0.73 m/s (144 ft/min) at 71 km/h (44 mph; 38 kn)
- Wing loading: 27.4 kg/m^{2} (5.6 lb/sq ft) (SZD-22A), 30 kg/m^{2} (6.144 lb/sqft) – (SZD-22B and SZD-22C with water ballast)

== See also ==
Aircraft of comparable role, configuration, and era

- Ka 6 Rhönsegler

Related lists

- List of gliders
