= PIK-5 =

Glider aircraft

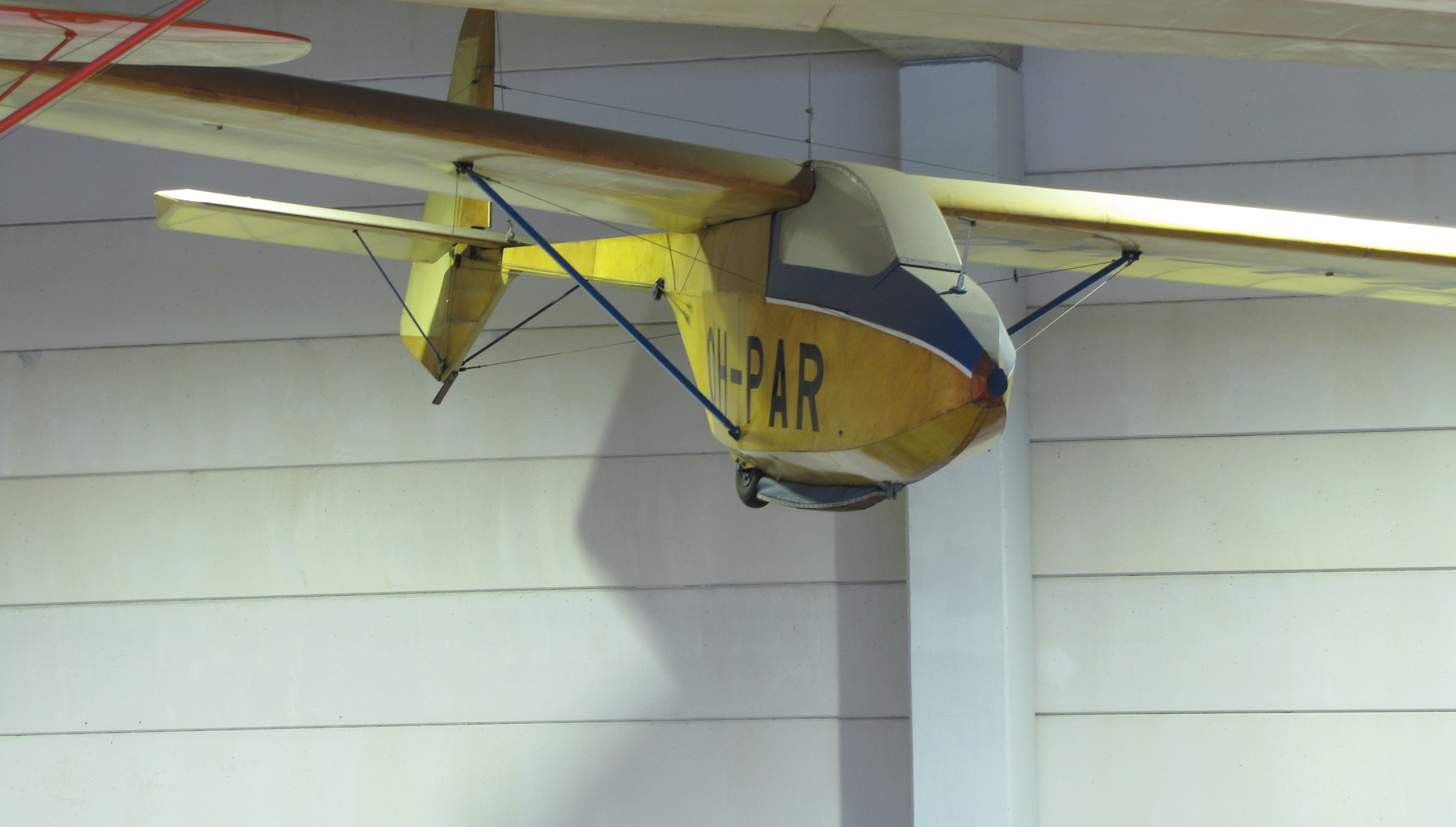
- PIK-5b in Finnish Aviation Museum

General information
- Type: Training glider
- National origin: Finland
- Manufacturer: Polyteknikkojen Ilmailukerho
- Designer: Kaarlo J. Temmes
- Number built: 34

History
- First flight: September 1946

The PIK-5 was a training glider produced in Finland in the 1940s, and 1950s, equipping the country's gliding clubs with an aircraft greater in performance than primary gliders but less than competition sailplanes.

The PIK-5 had a pod-and-boom configuration, with a high, strut-braced monoplane wing and a cruciform tail carried at the end of a tail boom that extended from a position high on the aft end of the pod.

== History ==
The prototype first flew in September 1946, and testing continued until it was badly damaged in a crash in summer 1948 Over the subsequent months, the wings were repaired, and a new fuselage constructed to a revised design. This was completed the following winter, and flights recommenced. However, this aircraft, now known as the PIK-5B, was destroyed in a crash in summer 1951.

Again, it was rebuilt with modifications, particularly to the wing structure, resulting in the PIK-5C version. This version first flew on 5 July 1952, and went on to become the pattern for around 30 similar machines that would be built over the ensuing years.

== Variants ==
- PIK-5
- PIK 5A
- PIK-5B
- PIK-5C

== Specifications (PIK-5C) ==
Data from Karhulan Ilmailukerho website : PIK-5c Cumulus (OH-151), The World's Sailplanes:Die Segelflugzeuge der Welt:Les Planeurs du Monde Volume II

General characteristics

- Crew: 1
- Length: 6.4 m (21 ft 0 in)
- Wingspan: 12.4 m (40 ft 8 in)
- Wing area: 14.7 m^{2} (158 sq ft)
- Aspect ratio: 10.4
- Airfoil: Göttingen 533
- Empty weight: 120 kg (265 lb)
- Max takeoff weight: 210 kg (463 lb)

Performance

- Stall speed: 45 km/h (28 mph, 24 kn)
- Never exceed speed: 190 km/h (120 mph, 100 kn)
- Rough air speed max: 120 km/h (74.6 mph; 64.8 kn)
- Aerotow speed: 20 km/h (12.4 mph; 10.8 kn)
- Winch launch speed: 90 km/h (55.9 mph; 48.6 kn)
- Terminal velocity: with full air-brakes at max all-up weight 180 km/h (112 mph; 97 kn)
- g limits: +4 -2
- Maximum glide ratio: 18 at 60 km/h (37.3 mph; 32.4 kn)
- Rate of sink: 0.85 m/s (167 ft/min) at 52 km/h (32.3 mph; 28.1 kn)
- Wing loading: 14.3 kg/m^{2} (2.9 lb/sq ft)
