= W.W.S.1 Salamandra =

W.W.S.1 / IS-A Salamandra
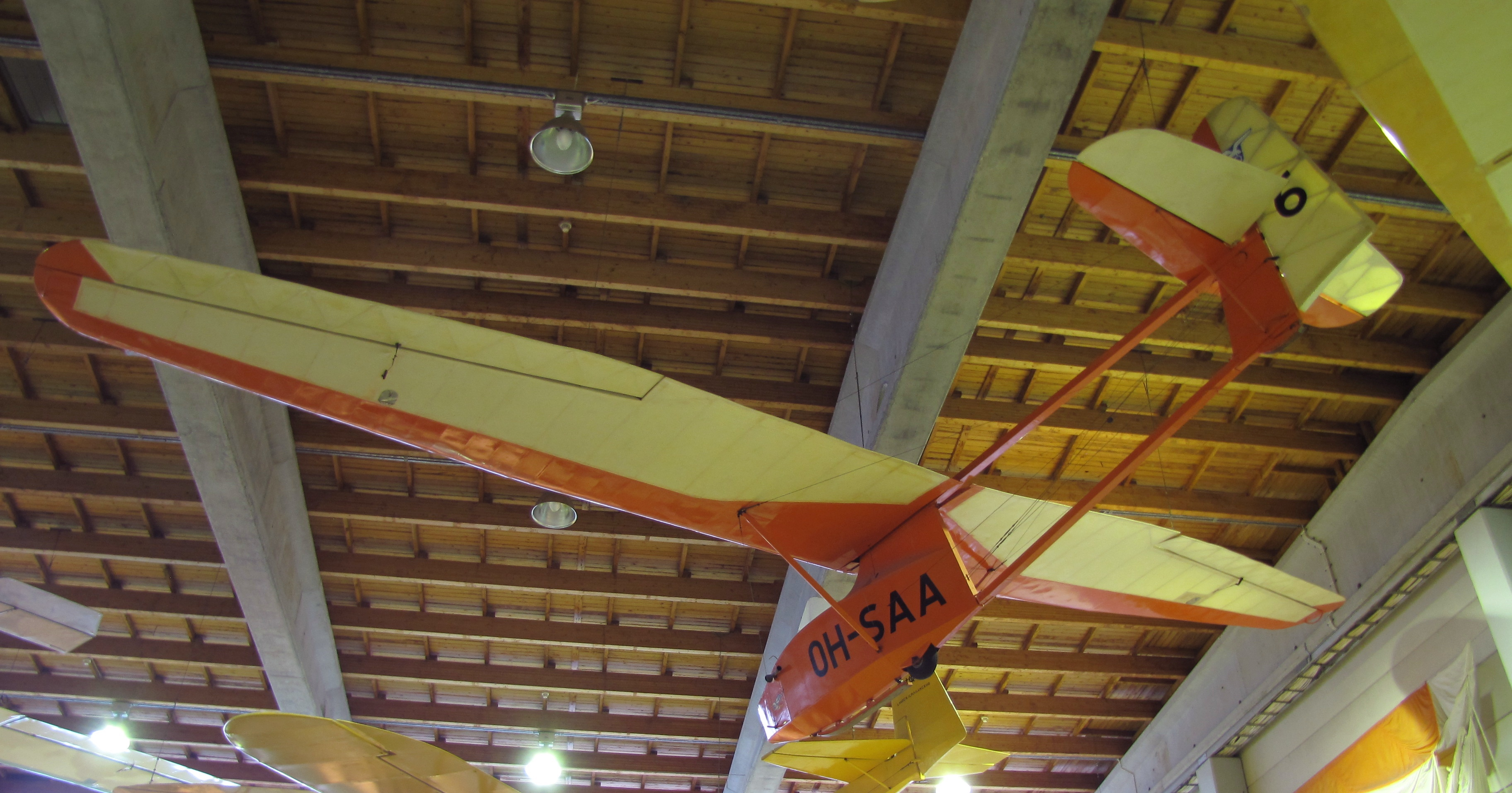
- W.W.S.1 Salamandra in Finnish Aviation Museum

General information
- Type: Glider
- National origin: Poland
- Manufacturer: Wojskowe Warsztaty Szybowcowe and others
- Designer: Wacław Czerwiński
- Number built: 500+ worldwide

History
- First flight: 1936
- Retired: 1962 (in Poland)

The W.W.S. 1 Salamandra (Salamander) was a single-seat training glider designed and built in Poland from 1936, and again from 1947 after World War II as IS-A Salamandra.

== Development ==
As the head of the W.W.S. (Wojskowe Warsztaty Szybowcowe - Military Glider Workshops), Wacław Czerwiński designed the W.W.S. 1 Salamandra during the mid-1930s. The excellent handling properties, ideal for the solo training methods then in use, led to mass production in various workshops throughout Poland.

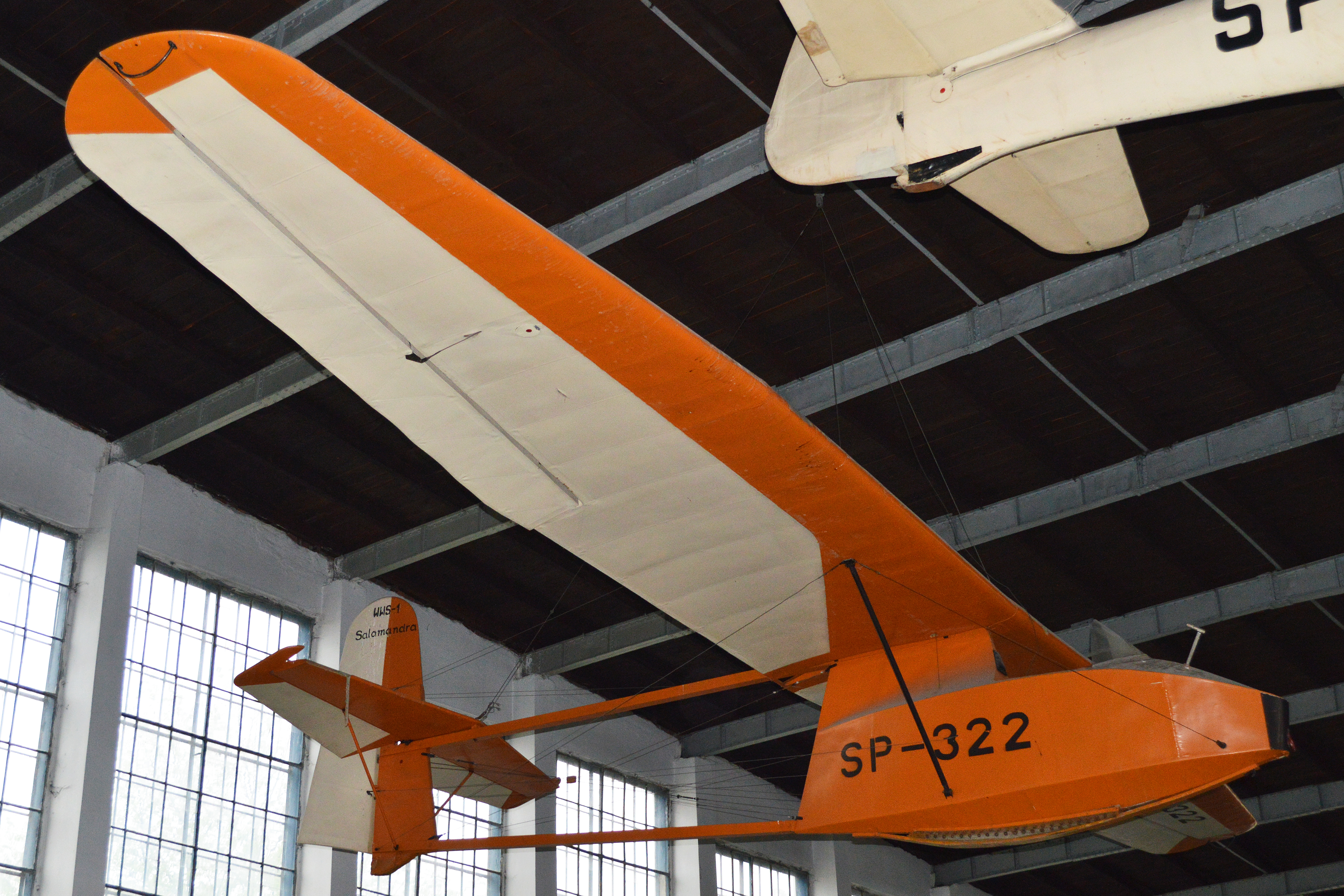
IS-A Salamandra in the Polish Aviation Museum in Kraków

During World War II, almost all Polish gliders and their technical documentation were destroyed or lost. After the war there was only one Salamandra left, kept hidden during the occupation, and it was decided to resume its production. Due to lack of blueprints, the design was reverse engineered in the IS (Instytut Szybownictwa - Gliding Institute). Five were built in March 1947 by the IS workshops as the first gliders in Poland after the war. In 1948 a serial production resumed as IS-A Salamandra 48 in workshops in Jeżów. It was followed by improved variants Salamandra 49 and 53, produced also by other state-owned aviation factories throughout Poland, among others WSK Okęcie.

Construction of the Salamandra was entirely of wood with fabric covering on wings and tail unit. The fuselage consisted of a plywood covered nacelle for the single seat cockpit, with a wire-braced open strut rear fuselage supporting the cruciform style tail-unit. The high mounted wire braced wings were supported by struts from the bottom of the fuselage to approx 1/5 span. Later versions introduced airbrakes in the wings (Salamandra 49) and a windscreen (Salamandra 53). Wooden skids under the tail and fuselage nacelle comprised the undercarriage. In Salamandra 53 there was introduced a bigger horizontal stabilizer, next retrofitted to earlier versions.

The most notable feat by a W.W.S. 1 Salamandra, in Poland, was an 11hr 15min flight by Buraka, between Brasław and Wilno, on 22 Aug 1938. Another marathon flight of 23 hours took place in Romania with a licence built version piloted by G. Braescu. After the war, 223 IS-A were built for Polish aero clubs, where they were used until 1962.

Before the war the WWS 1 was exported to Yugoslavia, Finland and Estonia. On 29 December 1956 there flew an export version Salamandra 53A – around 50 were exported to China, and a licence production started there. In China there was also developed a primary trainer two-seater variant, without a cockpit. In Yugoslavia there was built a similar glider Čavka, and in Finland - PIK-5. After migrating to Canada as a refugee, Czerwiński designed a modified Salamandra as the Czerwiński Sparrow, as well as an improved Sparrow designated Czerwiński Robin.

In 2017 one Salamandra was built in Gliwice Aero Club, to original plans.

== Variants ==
- W.W.S. 1 Salamandra – production aircraft from 1936.
- IS-A Salamandra – a reconstructed postwar version from 1947, 5 built (SP-320 - SP-324).
- IS-A Salamandra 48 – 1948 version, 75 built (first - SP-580).
- IS-A Salamandra 49 – 1949 version, with strengthened construction, equipped with air brakes, 93 built (first - SP-825).
- IS-A Salamandra 53 – 1953 version, with enlarged horizontal stabilizer, windscreen and other improvements, 50 built. (first - SP-1224)
- IS-A Salamandra 53A – 1956 export version for China, around 50 built plus licence production.
- Czerwiński Sparrow – modified Salamandra designed and built in Canada by Wacław Czerwiński as a refugee.
- Czerwiński Robin – modified Salamandra designed and built in Canada in Canada by Wacław Czerwiński as a refugee.

== Specifications (W.W.S. 1 Salamandra) ==
Data from http://www.piotrp.de/SZYBOWCE/pwws1.htm

General characteristics

- Crew: 1
- Length: 6.48 m (21 ft 3 in)
- Wingspan: 12.48 m (40 ft 11 in)
- Height: 2.3 m (7 ft 6 in)
- Wing area: 16.9 m^{2} (182 sq ft)
- Aspect ratio: 9.2:1
- Airfoil: Göttingen-378
- Empty weight: 110 kg (243 lb)
- Gross weight: 190 kg (419 lb)

Performance

- Maximum speed: 150 km/h (93 mph, 81 kn)
- Maximum glide ratio: 15.2:1 at 56 km/h (30 kn, 35 mph)
- Rate of sink: 0.8 m/s (160 ft/min) at 48 km/h (26 kn, 30 mph)

== See also ==
Aircraft of comparable role, configuration, and era

- Lippisch Zögling
- PIK-5
- Slingsby T.3 Primary
