= Slingsby T.25 Gull 4 =

British single-seat glider, 1947

General information
- Type: Glider
- National origin: England
- Manufacturer: Slingsby
- Designer: Mungo Buxton, John Sproule, Fred Slingsby and Peter Shaw
- Number built: 4

History
- First flight: late 1947

The Slingsby T.25 Gull 4 is a British glider designed and built by Slingsby that first flew in 1947.

== Development ==
After the Second World War Slingsby wished to produce a 15 m (49.2 ft) high-performance sailplane to be used in the Olympic games. The German DFS Meise, renamed Olympia, had already been chosen as the standard aircraft for the abandoned 1940 games and was produced in large quantities in several countries. The licence for the 'Olympia' was held by the Chilton Aircraft Company so Slingsby had no choice but to design his own version. Due to the identical specification and the use of state of the art construction the Gull 4 emerged with very similar features to the Olympia.

A replacement for the Kite 2 was proposed as the T.32 Gull 4B, but this glider did not reach the hardware stage.

== Design ==
The fuselage was of semi-monocoque wooden construction with plywood skinning throughout over longerons and built up frames, most of which were shared with the Slingsby T.26 Kite 2.

The wing was mounted on a narrowed pylon which faired into the cockpit canopy, reducing interference drag between fuselage and wing. A rubber sprung nose skid, landing wheel and sprung tail-skid completed the undercarriage. A large comfortable cockpit with an upright seat was covered by a canopy made from blown plexiglas, providing excellent visibility but sometimes giving a poor fit.

The cantilever two-part wing had a rectangular centre section and tapering outer sections from approximately ⅓-span. A thickened Göttingen 549 section was chosen for the wing root transitioning to Göttingen 549 at the fourth rib then to NACA 0009 at the tip with 5° wash-out at the tips. Large DFS-style airbrakes opening from the top and bottom surfaces aft of the main spar provided adequate approach control. Ailerons were fitted to the trailing edge over the outer ⅓-span. Constructed entirely of wood with steel fittings the single-spar wings had plywood-covered torsion boxes forming the leading edges, and fabric covering aft of the mainspars.

The fin was integral with the fuselage and also skinned with plywood. The tailplane was built up with wooden ribs and plywood leading edges stiffened with internal diagonal braces. The prototype was built with an adjustable tailplane for trimming but this was soon changed to a trim tab on the elevator.

== Operational history ==
Flight trials of the Gull 4 began in late 1947 revealing no major vices and very similar, if not superior, handling to the Olympia. Performance was superior, a measured L/D ratio of 24.2:1 compared very favourably with the Olympia's L/D ratio of 22.5:1, and minimum sink speeds were similar.

=== Samedan 1948 ===
Two Gull 4s were prepared for the International gliding championships to be held at Samedan in the Swiss Alps in July 1948, joining two Elliott Olympias, and two Weihes from RAF clubs in Germany. Philip Wills and Christopher Nicholson flew the two Gull 4s, during a disastrous competition where Nicholson flying a Gull 4 and Greig flying an Olympia were both killed flying in challenging conditions in the Alps. Wills flying the other Gull 4 missed fourth place overall due to a barograph failure during the first day's task, later establishing a British National speed record for the 100 km triangle at 47 km/h (29.2 mph).

=== After Samedan ===
The aircraft flown by Wills was exported to Australia and made a phenomenal climb in cloud to 23,500 ft without oxygen, the pilot was forced to land in trees, when he emerged from the cloud at around 30 m (100 ft), wrecking the aircraft. Re-built the Australian Gull 4 continued flying until a winch launching accident caused extensive damage, the wreckage is stored at Tocumwal. The prototype was bought by the London Gliding Club at Dunstable, flying National competitions in 1949 and 1950; after a crash on the Dunstable hill-side the wings were fitted to a Slingsby Kite 2 fuselage. The last Gull 4 was purchased by the RAFGSA and flew with the Moonrakers Club, took part in the 1950 Internationals in Sweden, where its canopy parted company, but despite a new canopy being flown in, results were disappointing. This aircraft succumbed to an accident in 1966.

== Specifications (Slingsby T.25 Gull 4) ==
Data from Slingsby Sailplanes, The World's Sailplanes:Die Segelflugzeuge der Welt:Les Planeurs du Monde

General characteristics

- Crew: 1
- Length: 23 ft 9 in (7.25 m)
- Wingspan: 49 ft 3 in (15 m)
- Wing area: 156.0 sq ft (14.49 m^{2})
- Aspect ratio: 15.6
- Airfoil: Göttingen 549 thickened - Göttingen 549 – NACA 0009
- Empty weight: 467 lb (211.8 kg) equipped
- Max takeoff weight: 700 lb (317.5 kg)

Performance

- Stall speed: 35 mph (56 km/h, 30 kn)
- Never exceed speed: 120 mph (193 km/h, 104 kn)
- Aerotow speed: 70 mph (110 km/h; 61 kn)
- Winch launch speed: 60 mph (97 km/h; 52 kn)
- g limits: +7.75
- Maximum glide ratio: 24 at 46 mph (74 km/h; 40 kn)
- Rate of sink: 156 ft/min (0.79 m/s) at 42 mph (68 km/h; 36 kn)
- Wing loading: 4.6 lb/sq ft (22.3 kg/m^{2})

== See also ==
Aircraft of comparable role, configuration, and era

- DFS Meise
- EoN Olympia

Related lists

- List of gliders
