= SZD-C Żuraw =

Polish training and aerobatic glider, 1952

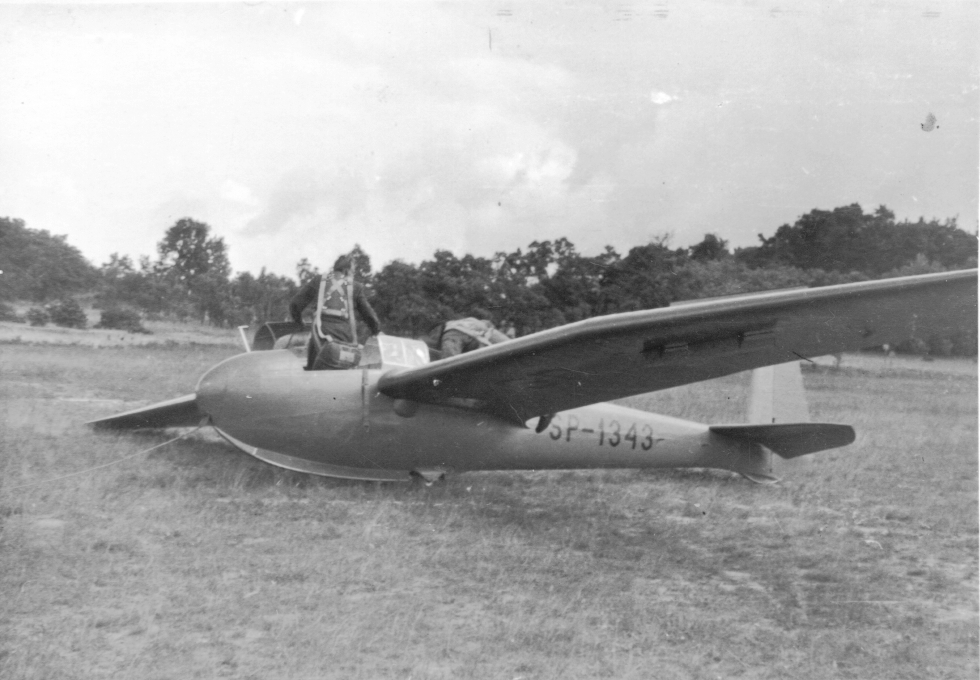
- IS-C (SZD-C) "Żuraw" (SP-1343), probably, at Jeżów Sudecki (Poland) in 1958.

General information
- Type: Glider aircraft
- National origin: Poland
- Manufacturer: ZSLS 4 Gdańsk
- Designer: Hans Jacobs; J. Niespał, A. Kokot
- Number built: 51

History
- First flight: 22 April 1952
- Developed from: DFS Kranich II

The SZD-C Żuraw (Szybowcowy Zakład Doświadczalny - Glider Experimental Works), also designated as IS-C is a two-seat training and aerobatic glider aircraft, built in Poland from 1952, a copy of the German DFS Kranich II.

== Development ==
World War II destroyed Polish pre-war gliders, but after the war, Poland was left in the possession of incomplete drawings and documentation for the DFS Kranich II, as well as gliders left behind by the retreating German forces. To provide the Polish Aero Club with a viable two-seat trainer, the SZD-C Żuraw II was developed from the Hans Jacobs-designed DFS Kranich II, adapted for Polish production by J. Niespał and A. Kokot. The name żuraw was a translation of Kranich and means crane. The Kranich was one of the best two-seater pre-war gliders, used to set many records.

The first flight of the Żuraw took place on 22 April 1952. In 1952-1953, 51 were manufactured in ZSLS 4 (Zakłady Sprzętu Lotnictwa Sportowego - Sports Aviation Equipment Works) in Gdańsk-Wrzeszcz (according to other sources, 54 in Gdańsk, Poznań and Jeżów, one of which was exported to Austria.)

Construction was entirely of wood with fabric covering on the wings aft of the mainspar. The pilot and instructor sat in tandem, with the student forward of the wings and the instructor immediately aft of the mainspar in the wing centre-section. The seating arrangement allowed the aircraft to be flown with one or two pilots without the need for ballast to adjust the centre of gravity. A single mainwheel with nose and tailskids comprised the undercarriage, with the aircraft sitting nose down on the nose skid with the front cockpit occupied. Large DFS style airbrakes extended from upper and lower wing surfaces aft of the mainspars.

== Operational history ==
The Żuraw gliders were used in regional aero clubs of the Polish Aero Club for training and sports flying until the 1960s. Two are preserved in the Polish Aviation Museum in Kraków (SP-1213 and SP-1295).

== Specifications (SZD-C Żuraw II) ==
Data from http://www.piotrp.de/SZYBOWCE/pszdc.htm

General characteristics

- Crew: 1 pilot
- Capacity: 1 passenger
- Length: 7.7 m (25 ft 3 in)
- Wingspan: 18 m (59 ft 1 in)
- Wing area: 14.3 m^{2} (154 sq ft)
- Aspect ratio: 22.7

Performance

- Maximum speed: 215 km/h (134 mph, 116 kn)
- Stall speed: 50 km/h (31 mph, 27 kn)
- Maximum glide ratio: 23 at 65 km/h (40 mph/35 kts)
- Rate of sink: 0.77 m/s (152 ft/min) at 54 km/h (33 mph/29 kts)

== See also ==
Related development

- DFS Kranich II
