= Stemme S6 =

German touring motor glider, 2006

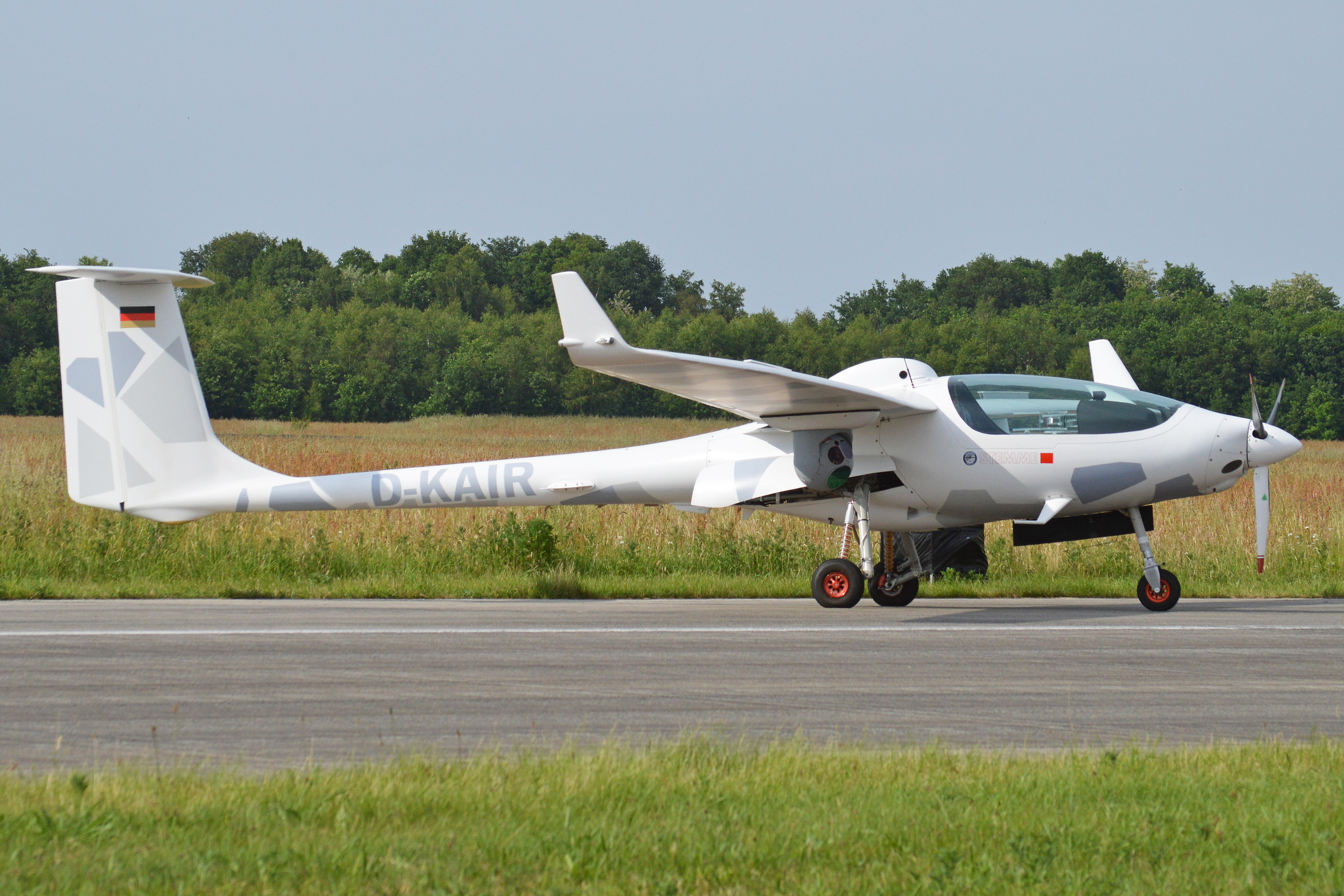

General information
- Type: Touring motor glider
- National origin: Germany
- Manufacturer: Stemme AG
- Number built: 18 by 2011

History
- First flight: 2006

The Stemme S6 is a two-seat touring motorglider manufactured by Stemme AG. Unlike the S10, the S6 has a non-retractable three-bladed propeller (that can feather, like other touring motor gliders), a wider fuselage design, and tricycle landing gear, available both with fixed and retractable configurations. Its engine is a Bombardier-Rotax 914, the same engine used in the Stemme S10-VT. The designers placed great importance on noise and vibration reduction.

The prototype S6 made its first flight on 29 November 2006 at Strausberg Airport, flown by Lothar Dalldorff. It received EASA approval on 22 October 2008.

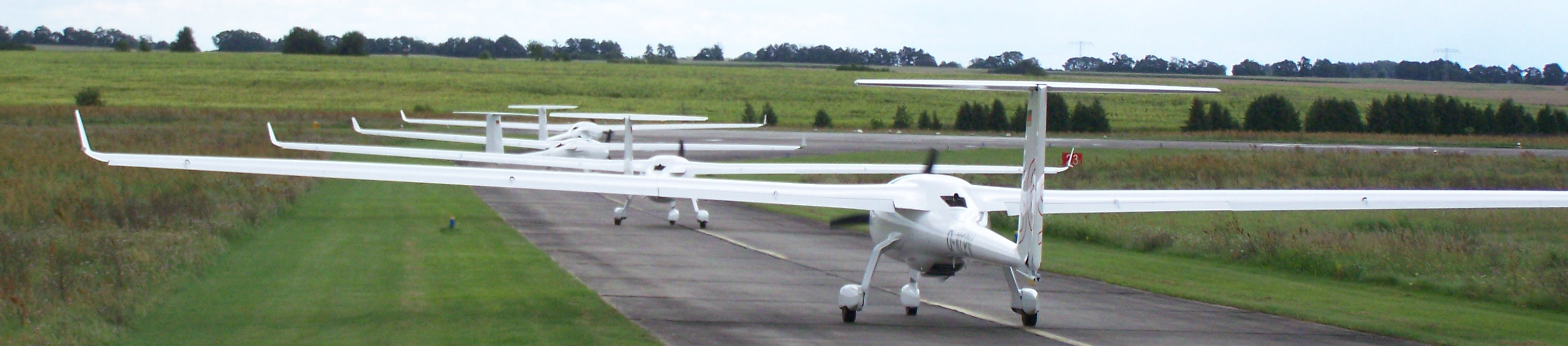

== Variants ==
S6
100 hp, fixed landing gear.
S6-R
retractable landing gear.
S6-T
115 hp turbocharged engine
S6-RT
115 hp turbocharged engine, retractable landing gear. First flown 10 December 2002.
S6ew Sky Sportster
20m wingspan with a 38 to 1 glide ratio
S8-T
as S6-T
S8-RT
as S6-RT but with roomier cockpit and greater fuel capacity.

== Specifications (S6-T) ==
Data from Jane's All the World's Aircraft 2013-14.

General characteristics

- Crew: 1 pilot
- Capacity: 1 passenger
- Length: 8.52 m (27 ft 11 in)
- Wingspan: 18.00 m (59 ft 1 in)
- Height: 2.45 m (8 ft 0 in)
- Wing area: 17.42 m^{2} (187.5 sq ft)
- Aspect ratio: 18.6
- Empty weight: 640 kg (1,411 lb)
- Max takeoff weight: 850 kg (1,874 lb)
- Powerplant: 1 × Rotax 914 F2 flat four, 84.5 kW (113.3 hp) geared drive
- Propellers: 3-bladed MTV-7-A/170-51, 1.70 m (5 ft 7 in) diameter constant speed

Performance

- Cruise speed: 256 km/h (159 mph, 138 kn) at FL100
- Never exceed speed: 268 km/h (167 mph, 145 kn)
- Range: 1,398 km (869 mi, 755 nmi) at FL160 with 130 litres of fuel, no reserve
- Service ceiling: 4,875 m (15,994 ft) service
- g limits: 5.3/-2.6
- Maximum glide ratio: 36:1 for retractable, 30:1 for fixed, at 115 km/h (71 mph; 62 kn)
- Rate of climb: 2.7 m/s (530 ft/min) maximum, at sea level
- Rate of sink: 0.93 m/s (183 ft/min) minimum with 70 kg (154 lb) load
- Wing loading: 48.79 kg/m^{2} (9.99 lb/sq ft)
