= Stemme S12 =

German touring motor glider, 2015

S12 Twin Voyager
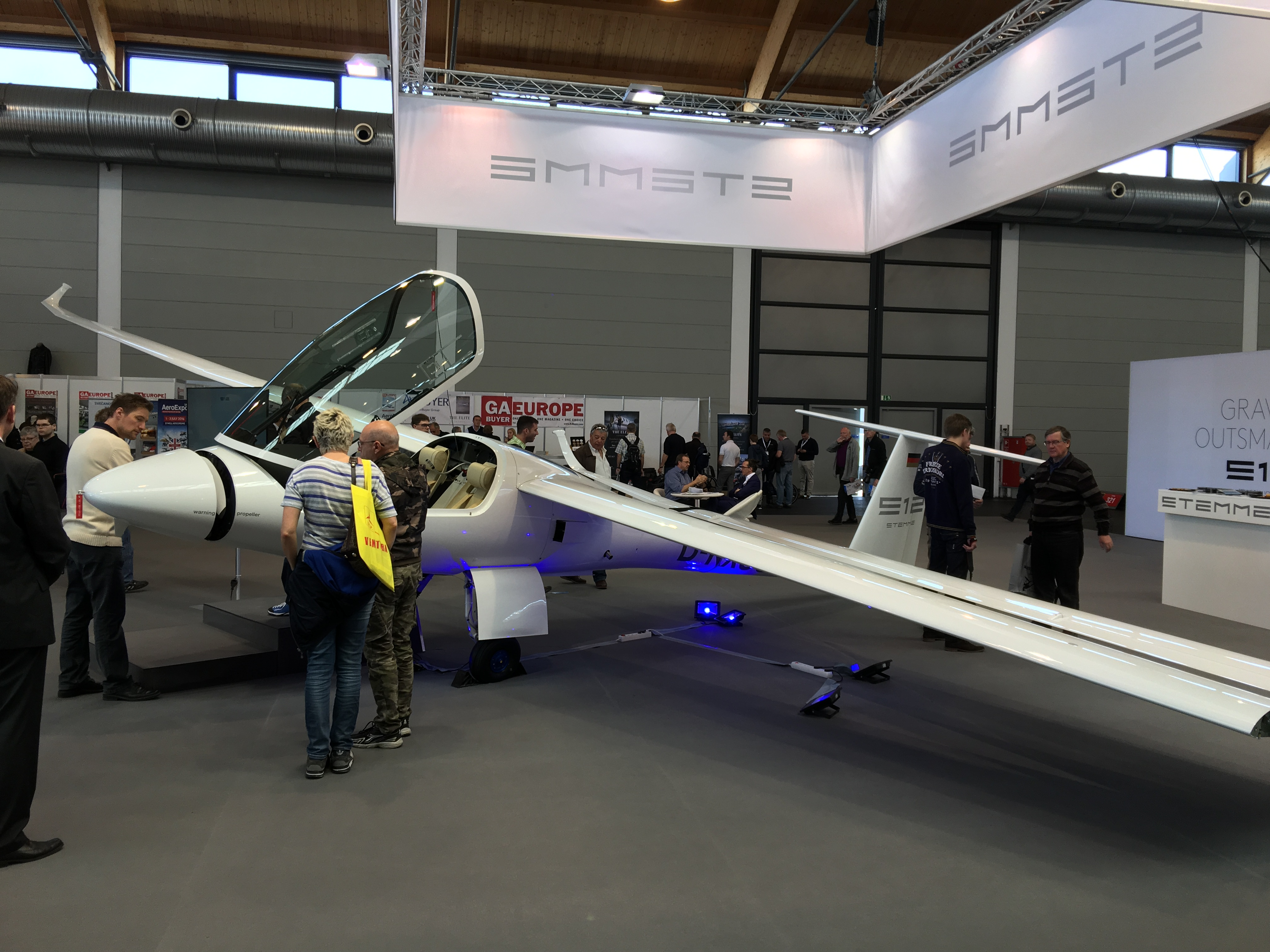
- Stemme S12 at AERO 2016

General information
- Type: Motor glider
- National origin: Germany
- Manufacturer: Stemme
- Status: Under development (2015); In production (2017)
- Number built: >30

History
- Introduction date: April 2015
- First flight: April 2015
- Developed from: Stemme S10
- Variant: Dzyne ULTRA

The Stemme S12 is a German high-wing, two-seat motor glider produced by Stemme of Strausberg. It was introduced at AERO Friedrichshafen in April 2015, shortly after its first flight.

== Design and development ==
Based in the Stemme S10, the Stemme S12 features a cantilever wing, a T-tail, a two-seats-in-side-by-side configuration enclosed cockpit under a bubble canopy and a single engine with a retractable propeller.

The aircraft is made from composite material. Its 25 m (82.0 ft) span wing employs winglets. The mid-fuselage-mounted engine is the 115 hp (86 kW) Rotax 914 F2/S1 four-stroke turbocharged powerplant driving a retractable, folding, variable-pitch propeller. Its maximum glide ratio is 53:1.

The $8 million Dzyne Unmanned Long-Endurance Tactical Reconnaissance Aircraft (ULTRA) is an uncrewed derivative deployed as part of an affordable ultra-long endurance ISR demonstration, capable of flights up to 80 hours.

== Specifications (S12) ==
Data from Grady

General characteristics

- Crew: one
- Capacity: one passenger
- Length: 8.42 m (27 ft 7 in) (propeller retracted)
- Wingspan: 25.0 m (82 ft 0 in) - 11.4 m (37.4 ft) span when folded
- Height: 1.75 m (5 ft 9 in)
- Wing area: 19.95 m^{2} (214.7 sq ft)
- Aspect ratio: 31.33
- Gross weight: 900 kg (1,984 lb) MTOW
- Fuel capacity: 120 litres (26 imp gal; 32 US gal)
- Powerplant: 1 × Rotax 914 F2/S1 four cylinder, liquid and air-cooled, turbocharged, four stroke aircraft engine, 86 kW (115 hp)
- Propellers: two-bladed retractable, folding, variable-pitch propeller

Performance

- Maximum speed: 259 km/h (161 mph, 140 kn) at 10,000 feet MSL
- Cruise speed: 230 km/h (140 mph, 120 kn)
- Range: 1,759 km (1,093 mi, 950 nmi)
- Endurance: 9.2 hr @ 55% power
- Maximum glide ratio: 53:1
- Rate of climb: 4.21 m/s (829 ft/min)
- Wing loading: 45.11 kg/m^{2} (9.24 lb/sq ft) at MTOW

== See also ==
- List of gliders
