= Safran Patroller =

Unmanned air vehicle

Patroller
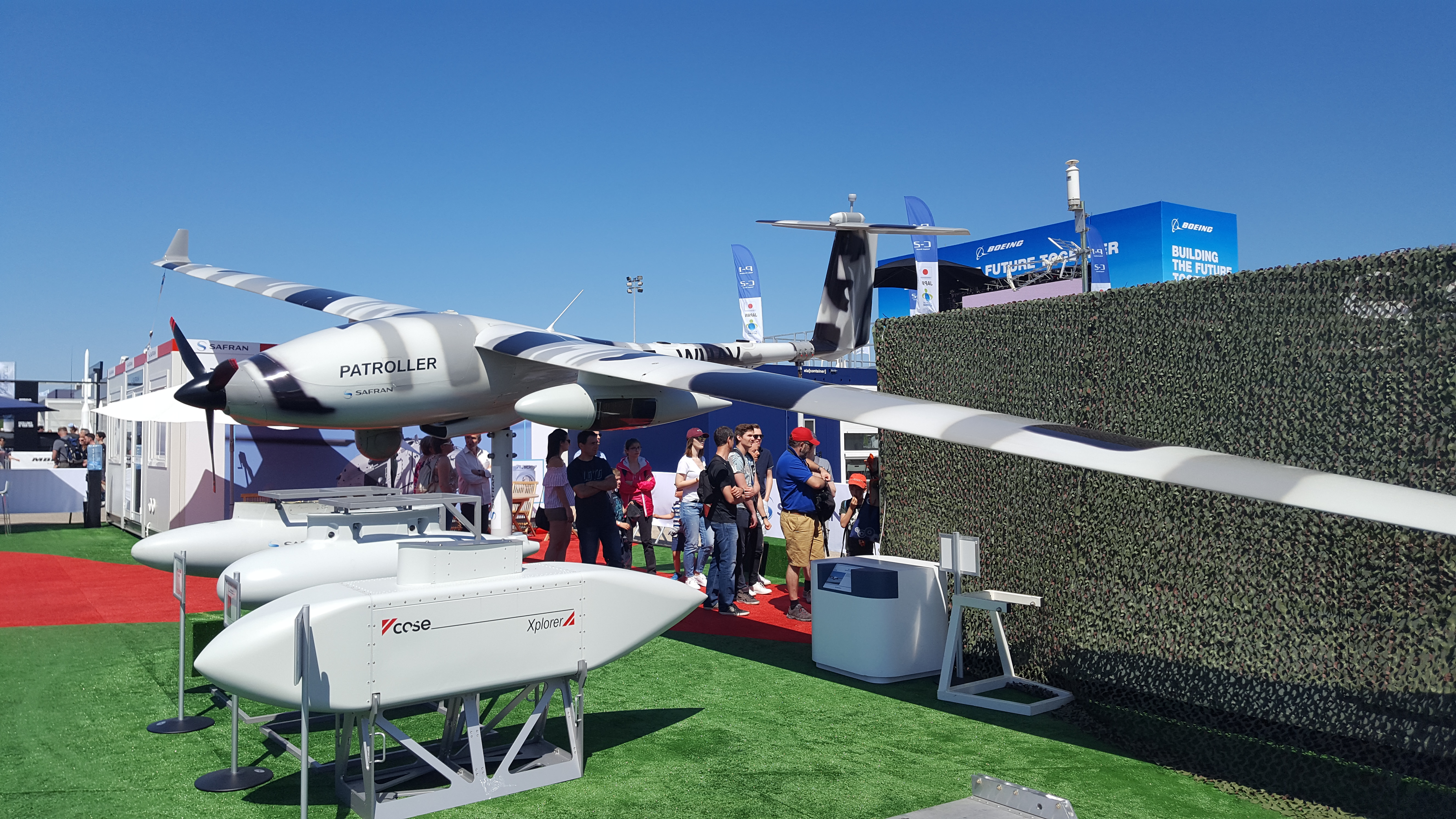
- Safran Patroller displayed at the Salon du Bourget (Paris, 2019)

General information
- Type: MALE UAV
- National origin: France
- Manufacturer: Safran Electronics & Defense
- Designer: Safran Electronics & Defense; Stemme
- Primary user: French Army

History
- Introduction date: 2023
- First flight: 10 June 2009
- Developed from: Stemme ASP S15

The Patroller is a French medium-altitude long-endurance unmanned aerial vehicle developed and manufactured by Safran Electronics & Defense (formerly by SAGEM). The airframe is based on the Stemme ASP S15 motor glider.

The first flight was in June 2009 at Kemijarvi in Finland; it was shown at the 2009 Paris Air Show. The Patroller is a Medium-altitude long-endurance unmanned aerial vehicle (MALE) by the definition of the NATO.

It completed another series of flight tests in July 2010, which demonstrated it is capable of missions lasting 20–30 hours; it can carry a 250 kg payload (including 80 kg under each wing). The Patroller will carry out imaging and surveillance trials in southern France, detecting forest fires.

The Patroller uses the same ground control station as Sperwer II. A Ku-band datalink is used; range is limited to 200 km (line of sight).

Safran Electronics & Defense and Egyptian aircraft factory AOI have signed a collaboration agreement concerning the Patroller UAV. AOI-Aircraft Factory could handle final assembly of the drones and will develop a dedicated training center in Egypt to train staff for the operation and maintenance of the drone systems.

The cost of the first 14 Patrollers for the French Army in 2016, including 12 years maintenance, was €300 million.

== Operators ==
Greece
Hellenic Army: First export customer; 4 drones and 3 ground stations ordered in June 2023 to complement or replace the SAGEM Sperwer.

== Specifications ==
Data from

General characteristics

- Crew: 0
- Length: 8.5 m (27 ft 11 in)
- Wingspan: 18 m (59 ft 1 in)
- Powerplant: 1 × liquid air cooled turbocharged Rotax 914F

Performance

- Maximum speed: 314 km/h (195 mph, 169 kn)
- Cruise speed: 92 km/h (57 mph, 50 kn)
- Endurance: 30 hours
- Service ceiling: 7,620 m (25,000 ft)
- Takeoff distance: 250 m (820 ft)

Avionics

- Euroflir 410 EO and IR sensors

== See also ==
Aircraft of comparable role, configuration, and era

- Elbit Hermes 450
- Thales Watchkeeper WK450

Related lists

- List of unmanned aerial vehicles
