= Stemme =

German light aircraft manufacturer

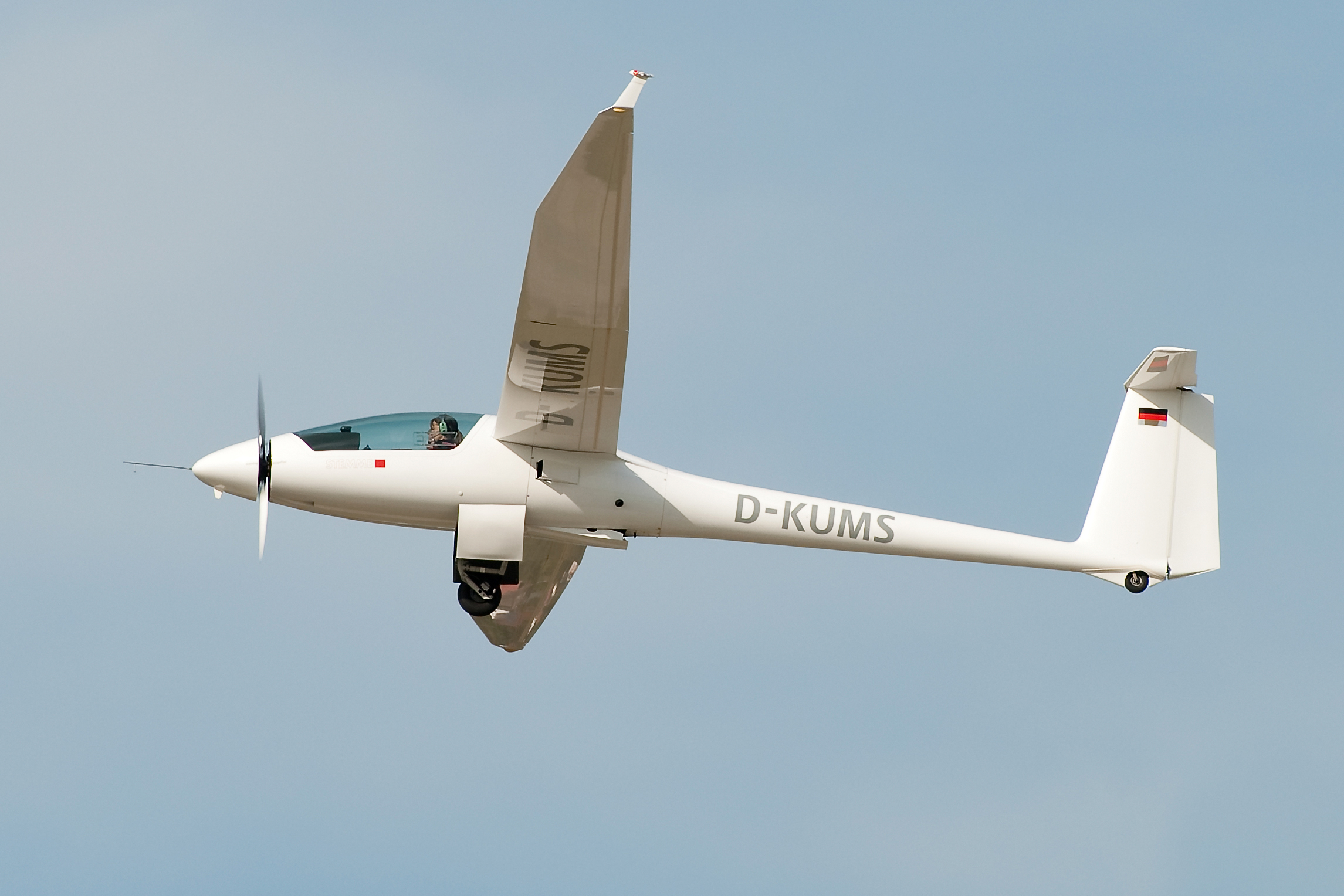
A Stemme-manafactured glider

Stemme GmbH is a German glider manufacturer. Aircraft production is complemented by service, maintenance and repair of their sports and personal aircraft.

Starting in 2014 many Stemme glider structural components were made under contract by Remos AG.

In April 2017 Stemme AG and Remos AG, manufacturers of the Remos GX series merged, under the name Stemme AG. The new company will retain its two locations and will expand the former Remos plant in Pasewalk. Stemme gliders and Remos lightplanes will continue as brands of the new combined company.

In September 2019, Bart Slager became CEO and replaced Paul Masschelein who had been CEO for six and a half years.

== List of Stemme aircraft ==
- Stemme S10 – self-launching motorglider and original aircraft
- Stemme S6 – touring motorglider
- Stemme S12 – touring motorglider and current production model
- Stemme S15 – Prototype UAV based on S6
- The SAGEM Patroller is based on the S15.
- Stemme ASP S15

== RS.aero ==
Founded in 2017, RS.aero was spun off from Reiner Stemme’s former business. The focus of RS.aero is on electrically powered motorgliders with an initial concept aircraft named the Elfin.
