= Mountain Wave Project =

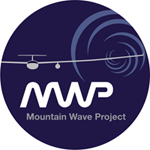
Logo Mountain Wave Project

The Mountain Wave Project (MWP) pursues global scientific research of gravity waves and associated turbulence. MWP seeks to develop new scientific insights and knowledge through high altitude and record seeking glider flights with the goal of increasing overall flight safety and improving pilot training.

== Corporate history ==
=== Motivation ===
Wind movement over terrain and ground obstacles can create wavelike wind formations which can reach up to the stratosphere. In 1998 the pilots René Heise and Klaus Ohlmann founded the MWP, a project for global classification, research, and analysis of orographically created wind structures (e.g. Chinook, Foehn, Mistral, Zonda). The MWP is an independent non-profit-project of the Scientific and Meteorological Section of the Organisation Scientifique et Technique du Vol à Voile (OSTIV) and is supported by the Fédération Aéronautique Internationale (FAI).

The MWP was originally focused on achieving better understanding. of the complex thermal and dynamic air movements in the atmosphere, and using that knowledge to achieve ever greater long distance soaring flights. As MWP gained greater awareness of the power inherent to mountain wave-like structures in the atmosphere, and their strong vertical airflows, it became obvious that they presented great dangers to civil aviation in multiple ways. Therefore, the focus of the MWP shifted to a more scientific approach to the airflow phenomena, with the goal of discovering new ways to increase overall aviation safety. Through the support of other scientists and cooperation partners the core group became more powerful and gained greater depth of knowledge. The integration of Joerg Hacker from the Airborne Research Australia (ARA) into the core group significantly enhanced the overall depth of knowledge of the group.

=== Airborne measurements ===
In order to learn more about the relevant physical process in the atmosphere, the MWP Team launched two expeditions in the Argentinean Andes in 1999 and 2006. For high altitude flights a modified Stemme S10 VT motorglider was used as a platform for airborne data acquisition and measurement. The pilots were assisted with life support equipment and physiological preparations by the renowned flight physicians of the German Aerospace Center (DLR) and by astronaut Ulf Merbold.

Thanks to the help of qualified scientists and state-of-the-art sensor technology, the MWP achieved its goal to gather and analyze wave structure data with impressive results at the operation in Mendoza in October 2006. Research flights and operations were completed in the region between the Tupungato (5.700 m) and Aconcagua (6.900m), which is very well known for its extremely treacherous turbulence.

=== Record flights ===
Between 2000 and 2004 MWP team member Klaus Ohlmann further developed and expanded on the knowledge about wave systems gained in the Andes in 1999, and accumulated a wealth of experience. This educational process allowed him to win the OSTIV Kuettner Prize for the first 2000 km straight out wave flight, as well as completing the world's longest recorded soaring flight of 3,008 km. He was supported by his MWP teammates in Germany using internet communications to provide specific weather predictions using a new weather forecasting tool. In these flights, he provided crucial in-flight data, which in turn helped to improve subsequent weather predictions by the team in Germany.

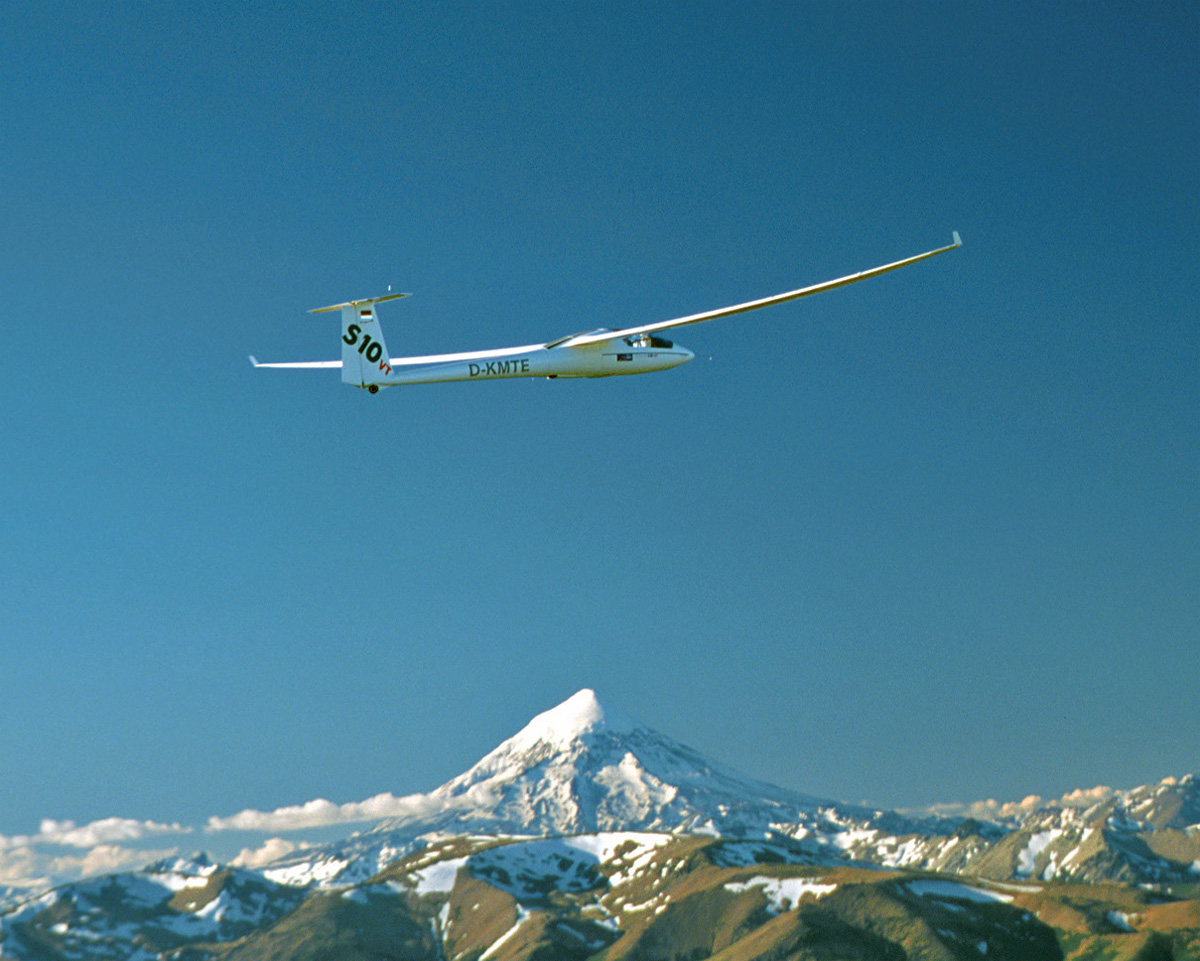
MWP-Research Airplane Stemme S10 VT across the volcano Lanin

Two MWP members participated in the 2006 field research campaign of the Terrain Induced Rotor Experiment (T-REX) which took place in the Sierra Nevada (U.S.A.). René Heise served as scientific reviewer for the National Science Foundation and contributed MWP wave forecasts to the data archive. Wolf-Dietrich Herold documented activities in Boulder/CO and Bishop/CA and produced a TV-report of the project for the German TV station RBB.

== Programming objectives ==
- Detection and determination of physical processes in the atmosphere, and their associated synoptic characteristics, which play the primary role in the generation and development of mountain waves.
- Investigation of rotor bands: determination of their location, spatial extension and classification of associated turbulence
- High resolution measurement of relevant meteorological variables (e.g., potential temperature, turbulence parameters, vertical and horizontal wind, humidity, etc.)
- Visualisation of the rotors/regions of turbulence with a GeoInformationService (GIS).
- Statistical analysis of wave flights (IGC-files of GPS flight loggers) to develop an empirical GIS-based representation of wave and rotor locations
- Verification of mesoscale forecast models and fine tuning of the applied parameterisations
- Application of the acquired data, scientific results, and prediction tools to enhance the safety and effectiveness of air traffic route planning, and improve pilot training. Furthermore, assisting in the development and creation of focused training methodology, tools and simulator scenarios.

== Expeditions ==
- Argentina 1999: Base San Martín de los Andes (Argentina); some flights above 1,000 km, a record flight (1,550 km) of Klaus Ohlmann up to Fireland (Rio Grande), the southernmost glider flight in the World
- Serres (France) & Jaca (Spain) 2003: Measurement flights of southerly wave conditions in Provence, additionally wave flights under stormy weather conditions in the Lee of Pyrenees
- Operation Mendoza 2006: Base Plumerillo (Argentina); Measurement Campaign at invitation of the Argentine Air Force, Flights with BATprobe up to 12,500 m height over the cordillera of the Tupungato-Aconcagua region.
- Tibet 2010- site visit: Presentation of the MWP field campaign in Lhasa Exploration of emergency landing strips along the route Shigatse - Tingri
- Nepal 2013-14: How to Soar the Himalayas- Pioneer flights with MWP research aircraft (a Stemme S10-VT) over Annapurna- Mount Everest region.

== Project results ==
- Development of an operational lee wave forecast in co- operation with the Bundeswehr Geo Information Service and the German Weather Service.
- Global and Regional Assessment Tool for wave activities and the risk of turbulence. This experimental forecast tool is used especially with a combination of a relocatable mesoscale models for the regions of Antarctica, Hindukush/ Tian Shan, Kamchatka, Sierra Nevada and Tibet.
- First scientific measurement flights of turbulence over the Andes. Validation of airborne measurements of the parameters- wind, temperature, moisture and pressure in combination with soundations and vertical satellite measurements (Radio-Occultation, Remote Sensing with GPS)
- Cataloging of over 200 global positions of Rotor-Wave systems, and their visualization in a Geographical Informations System (GIS); Analyzing of accidents and incidents due to mountain wave turbulence in the commercial and general aviation
- Development of a mathematical and statistical algorithms to filter wave climbs in GNSS-flight recorder data, using for an optimization of record flights
- Aviation Highlights: record flight to Rio Grande in Tierra del Fuego (MWP-Argentina `99); World Record Flight (FAI Category Free Distance) 2.120 km (OSTIV Kuettner Prize)
- High altitude physiology preparations and recommendations for pilots (Human Factors)

== Awards ==
- 2003 OSTIV Kuettner Prize for the first 2000 km straight out wave flight for MWP chief pilot (Klaus Ohlmann)
- 2007 Second Awardee of „Lilienthal- Preis”
- 2011 Finalists of the Aerospace Medical Association Jeff Myers Young Investigator Award (Rene Heise)
- 2011 Outreach & Communication Award of the European Meteorological Society (EMS), (Rene Heise)

== GEO-TV features ==
- 2003 Berlin-Brandenburg Broadcasting (RBB) - Rodeo in the Sky - Research for greater flight safety/Rodeo am Himmel - Forschung für mehr Flugsicherheit (45 min; German/English)
- 2007 ARTE 360° GEO- documentation - The Waveriders of the Andes/Die Windreiter der Anden/Les Enragés du vol à voile (45min; German/French)
- 2011 3sat TV-feature in connection with the 6th Severe Weather Congress Hamburg 2011, Wellengang in der Luft- hinter Bergen entstehen gefährliche Luftwirbel (6min; German)
- 2015 Deutsche Welle (DW) - From Strausberg to Mount Everest (Part I (45min, Part II 45min, Englisch/German)
