= Stemme S10 =

German touring motor glider, 1984

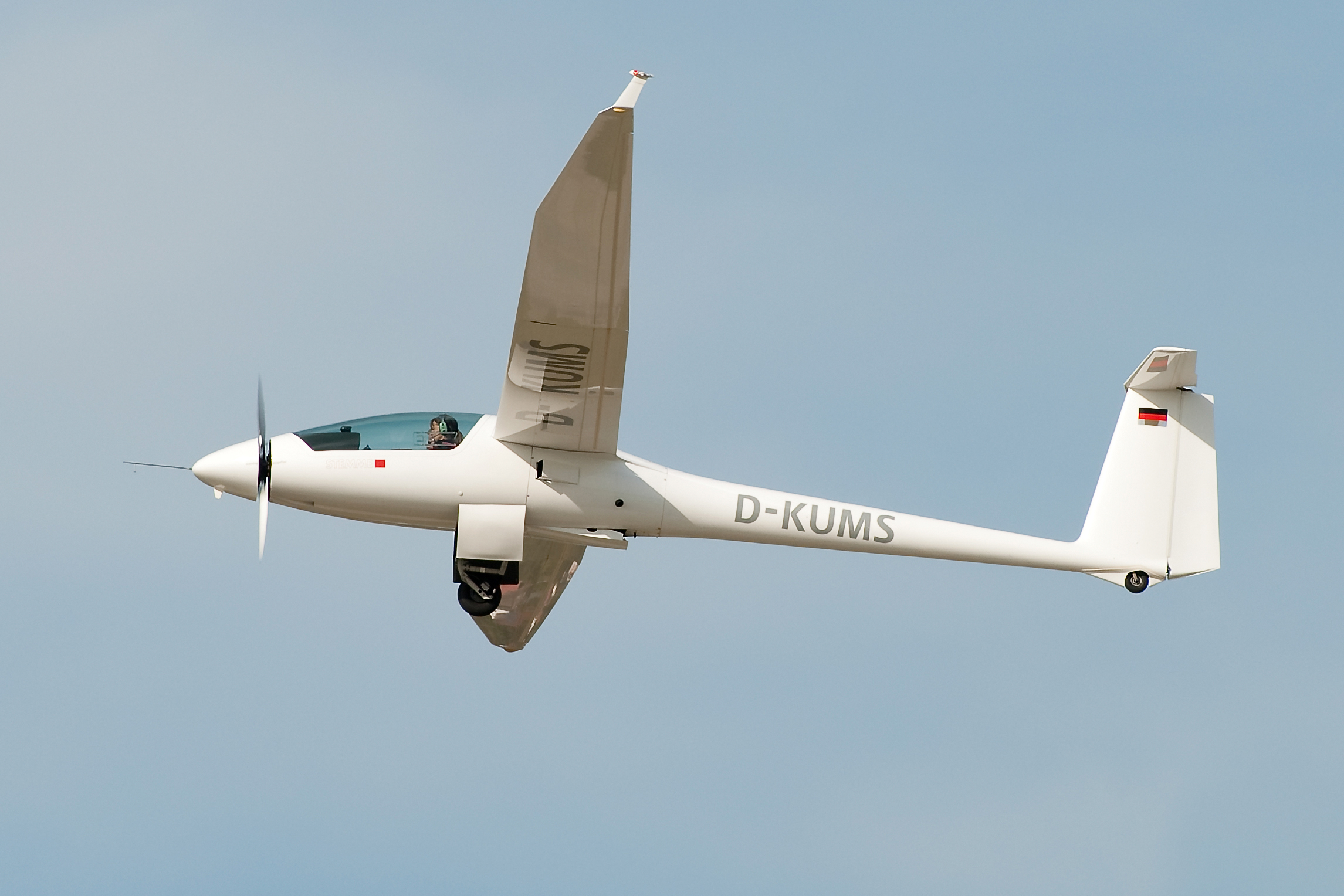
- A Stemme S10 taking off

General information
- Type: motor glider
- National origin: Germany
- Manufacturer: Stemme AG

History
- First flight: 1986

The Stemme S10 is a self-launching sailplane produced by Stemme AG in Strausberg (Germany) since the 1980s. The engine is mounted amidships and it features an unusual folding propeller which is stowed inside the aircraft's nose-cone when the engine is not in use.

== Design and development ==
The Stemme S10 also has several unusual features such as a tailwheel undercarriage and a side-by-side cockpit. It does not have a tow hook connection so it must self-launch. The two main wheels retract and lower electrically, though they can also be lowered manually if needed. There is an option to fold wings to reduce hangar span to 11.4 m (37 ft 5 in). The engine restart time is 5 seconds. A solar panel can provide additional electrical power during long flights. It has a steerable tailwheel, Schempp-Hirth spoilers and optional winglets. The current variant, the S10-VT, has a variable-pitch propeller which allows more power during take off, and a new turbocharged Bombardier Rotax 914F engine in place of the earlier Limbach L2400. Most parts are made in Poland, but future production will be handled by Remos Aircraft.

First seen at the 1996 Berlin Air Show, the S15 variant has a span reduced to 20.0 m (65 ft 7 in) and has two underwing hardpoints for scientific or surveillance sensor pods. There is also an unpiloted version, the S-UAV, again intended for surveillance.

== Operational history ==
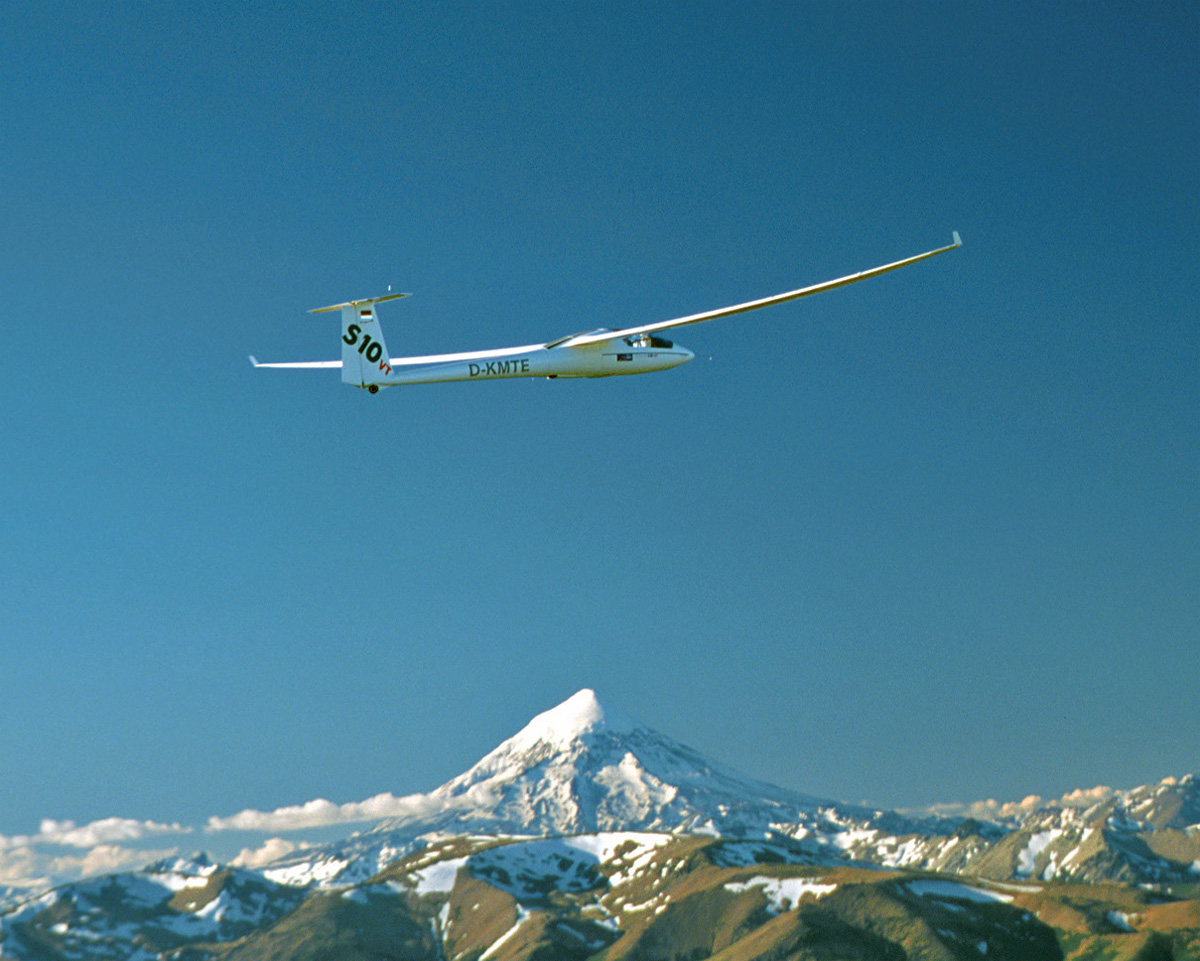
MWP-Research Airplane Stemme S10 VT across the volcano Lanin

Atmospheric measurements were made with S10 VT during the Mountain Wave Project (MWP) Expedition Argentina'99 1,550 km (963 mi) record flight to Tierra del Fuego and during Expedition Mendoza 2006, when scientific measurements of atmospheric turbulence were made up to 12,500 m (41,010 ft) around and over the highest mountain of the Americas, Aconcagua.

An S10 was flown by Klaus Ohlmann as a pure glider for a record distance of 2,463 km (1,530 mi) , in a 14-hour flight.

For the MWP Himalaya research mission in 2013/2014, the expedition leader chose a Stemme S10 VTX from FH Aachen to map the glacier areas of the Annapurna-Mount Everest region for the first time and to research the mountain wind systems. The Deutsche Welle TV science documentary ‘From Strausberg to Mount Everest’ demonstrates the wide range of capabilities of the Stemme S10 for scientific measurement campaigns.

Two examples were used by the United States Air Force Academy between 1995 and 2002 under the designation TG-11A.

In December 2017, the Colombian Air Force received two Stemme S10 VTs for training purposes.

== Variants ==
S10
Standard production variant.
S10V
Variable pitch prop variant.
S10VC
Surveillance variant with underwing sensor pods.
S10-VT
115hp Turbocharged Rotax 914F power.
TG-11A
S10s operated by the U.S. Air Force Academy

== Specifications (S 10-VT) ==
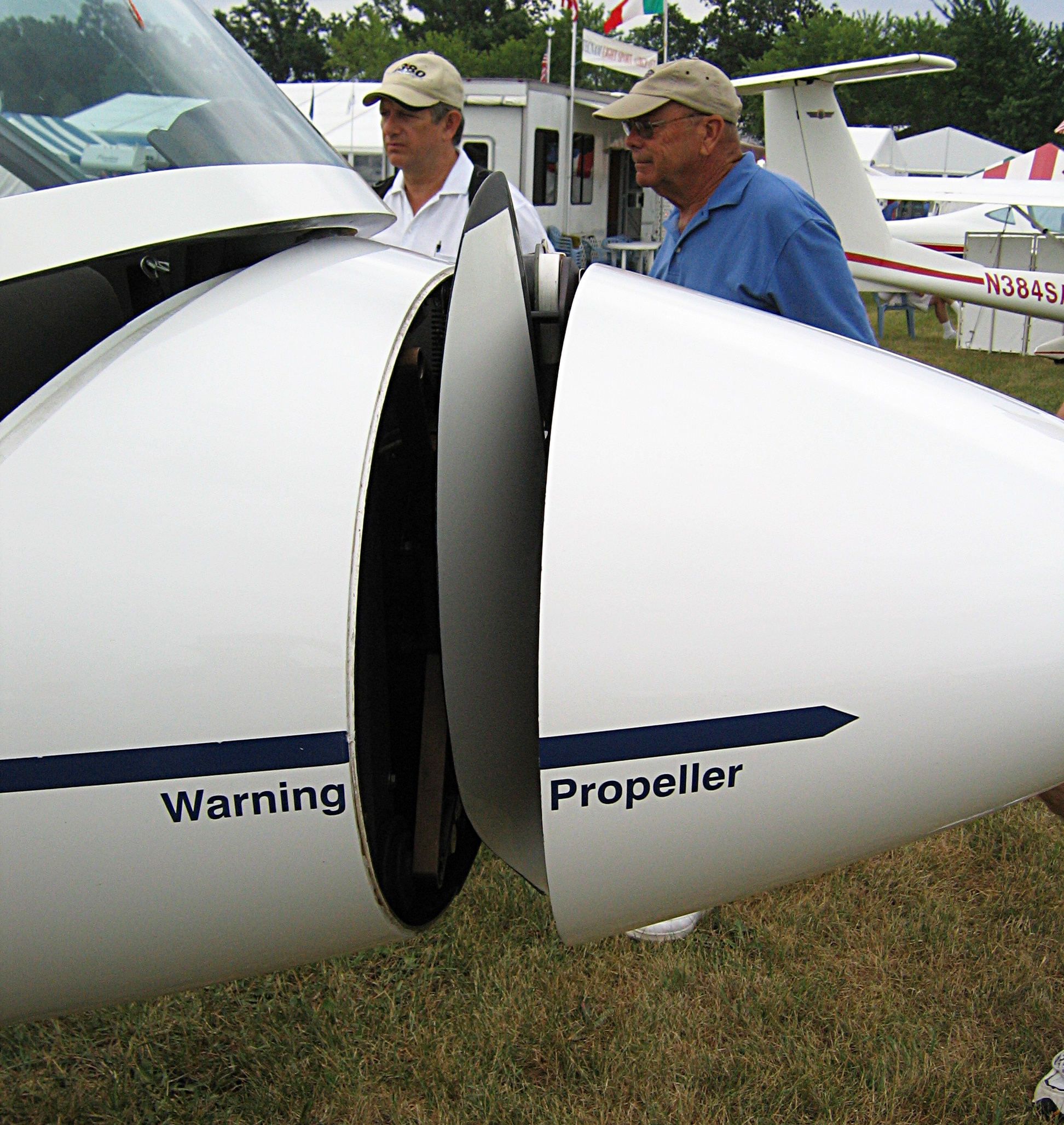
Retractable propeller of the Stemme S10: When the engine, which is behind the cockpit, is shut down the prop folds and the nose cone slides back, leaving a clean nose.

Data from Jane's All The World's Aircraft 2003–2004.

General characteristics

- Crew: 1 pilot
- Capacity: 1 passenger
- Length: 8.42 m (27 ft 7 in)
- Wingspan: 23.00 m (75 ft 6 in) (excluding winglets)
- Height: 1.80 m (5 ft 11 in)
- Wing area: 18.70 m^{2} (201 sq ft)
- Aspect ratio: 28.3
- Empty weight: 645 kg (1,422 lb)
- Gross weight: 850 kg (1,874 lb)
- Powerplant: 1 × Rotax 914 F2/S1 turbocharged flat-four engine, 84.6 kW (113 hp)
- Propellers: 2-bladed

Performance

- Cruise speed: 259 km/h (161 mph, 140 kn)
- Stall speed: 78 km/h (48 mph, 42 kn)
- Never exceed speed: 270 km/h (168 mph, 146 kn)
- Range: 1,730 km (1,075 mi, 934 nmi) (maximum fuel)
- Service ceiling: 9,140 m (30,000 ft)
- g limits: +5.3/-2.65
- Maximum glide ratio: 50
- Rate of climb: 4.0 m/s (790 ft/min)
- Rate of sink: 0.57 m/s (112 ft/min)
