= Dzyne ULTRA =

U.S. surveillance drone

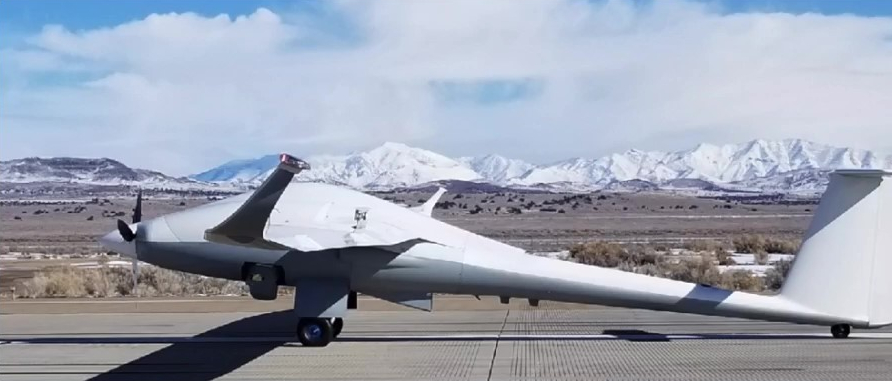
- ULTRA in 2023

General information
- Type: Surveillance unmanned aerial vehicle
- Status: In limited service
- Primary user: United States Air Force
- Number built: 4; another 4 ordered in 2025

History
- Introduction date: 2024
- Developed from: Stemme S12

The ULTRA (Unmanned Long-endurance Tactical Reconnaissance Aircraft) is a developmental unmanned aerial vehicle (UAV) built by Air Force Research Laboratory (AFRL) Center for Rapid Innovation (CRI) and DZYNE Technologies Incorporated.

== Background ==
Since 2008, the U.S. Air Force's primary reconnaissance aircraft has been the MQ-9 Reaper. However, at a price of $30 million per aircraft, it has been shown to be costly if lost; during the Red Sea crisis from October 2023 to May 2025, the Houthis shot down at least 15 Reapers. Part of the cost comes from its configuration as a strike UAV, but only a "single-digit percentage" of surveillance missions it flew required a strike capability, so the U.S. Air Force pursued a simpler and cheaper alternative for flying pure reconnaissance missions.

== Design and development ==
AFRL's CRI began development of an affordable UAS capable of multi-day duration flights in 2019, going from concept to first flight in less than 10 months. DZYNE had previously worked on the Long Endurance Aircraft Program (LEAP), which produced an autonomous aircraft deployed in 2016 and could fly for up to 40 hours. This prior experience led to the development of ULTRA, which the Air Force officially started buying in the 2025 budget request, procuring four drones for $35 million.

ULTRA is designed to be an intelligence, surveillance and reconnaissance (ISR) truck capable of carrying a variety of electro-optical/infrared (EO/IR) and radio frequency (RF), other low-cost intelligence collection payloads, and sensors to provide a reconfigurable platform.

ULTRA increased endurance and lowered acquisition cost by repurposing the manned Stemme S12 commercial sport glider and converting it to a military hardened drone using commercial-off-the-shelf UAV technology, existing manufacturing and supply channels, and limited custom avionics. Lower cost EO/IR and RF sensors are possible due to lower operating altitudes that do not require large optics or high-power RF. It can fly for over 80 hours while carrying over 400 lb (180 kg) of payload and it has a wingspan of over 80 ft (24 m).

Endurance allows these sensors to cover areas with fewer aircraft. It has enough range and endurance to loiter for a day over a target after traveling over 2,000 mi (3,200 km). The aircraft relies on an operator friendly command and control system that allows for "Point and Click" operations. Global operations are possible through satellite-based command and control links that also provide the high-rate ISR data feed to the operators in real time.

In May 2024, The War Zone reported that ULTRA was being operated from Al Dhafra Air Base in the United Arab Emirates. In July 2024, a successful three-day test flight was described to Axios.

== See also ==
- MQ-9 Reaper
- RQ-4 Global Hawk
- Aurora Flight Sciences Orion
- High-altitude platform station

Related lists

- List of unmanned aerial vehicles
