= Remos GX =

German ultralight aircraft

G3 Mirage & GX
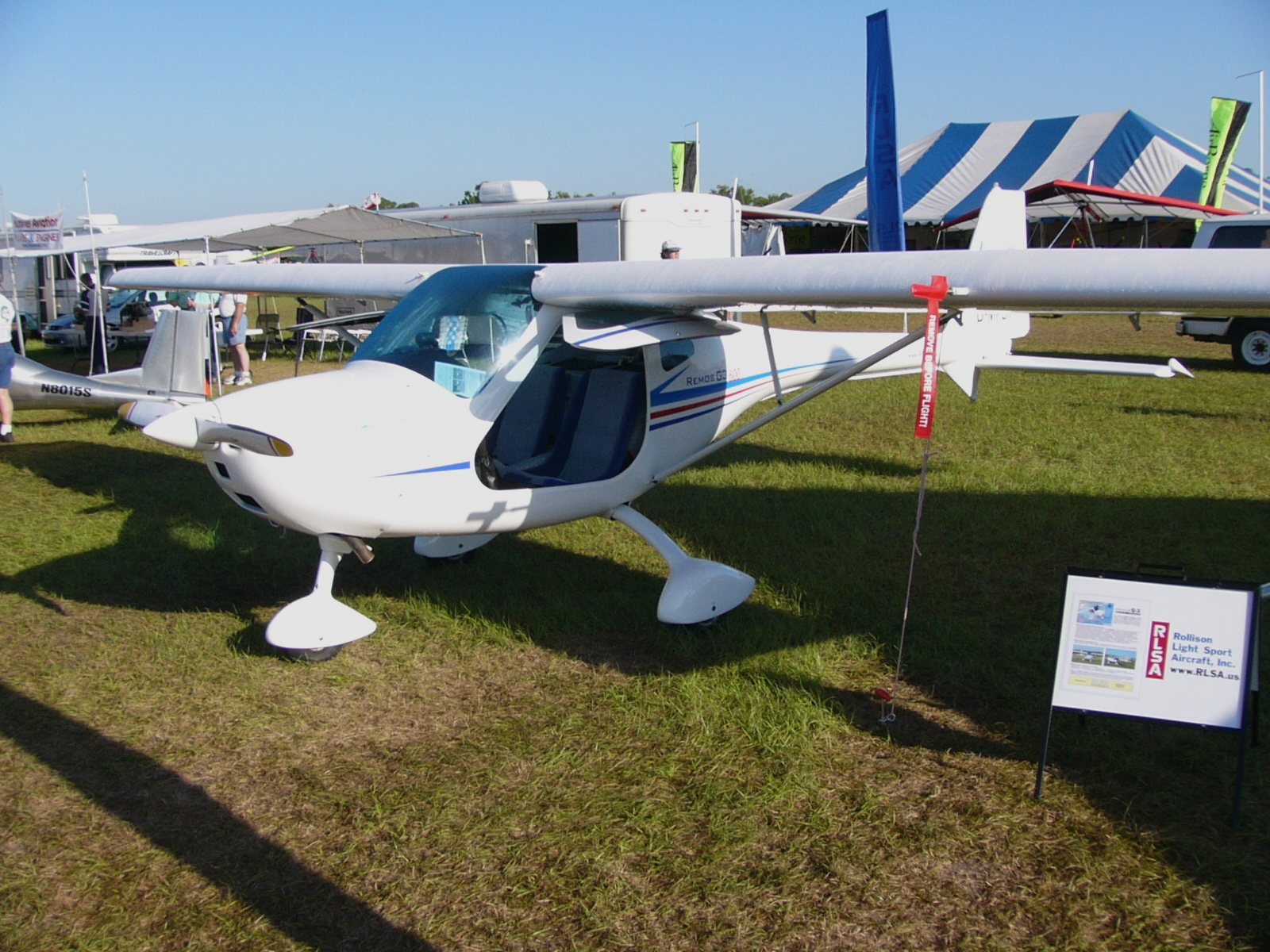
- Remos G3

General information
- Type: Light Sport Aircraft
- National origin: Germany
- Manufacturer: Remos AG
- Number built: 400

History
- First flight: (G3) 20 September 1997
- Developed from: Remos Gemini Ultra

The Remos G3 Mirage and Remos GX are German high wing, two seat, single engine light aircraft, built by Remos AG of Pasewalk. The aircraft was supplied as a kit for amateur construction or complete and ready-to-fly. Production ceased when Remos was purchased by Stemme in 2023; Stemme retained Remos' skilled employees.

== Design and development ==
The aircraft was marketed in the United States as a Light Sport Aircraft, and as an ultralight in most of Europe. It is a high-wing design, mostly using engines from the Rotax 912 family. It was developed from the similar Remos Gemini Ultra. The Mirage has the same layout, landing gear and structure but has a span reduced by 1.00 m (3 ft 3 in), is 170 mm ( 6.7 in) longer and is 34 kg (75 lb) heavier. The Mirage also adds an elevator trim tab and electrical flap operation. The Gemini's standard two-stroke 48 kW (64 hp) Rotax 582 engine was replaced in the Mirage by a 60 kW (80 hp) four-stroke Rotax 912UL.

The wings of the G3 Mirage have a constant chord centre section with straight tapered outer panels. The inboard sections carry electrically operated flaps. There is a single lift strut on each side, attached to the lower fuselage. Behind the cabin the fuselage is slender and carries a low set, straight tapered tailplane with horn balanced elevators. The fin and rudder are straight edged and sharply tapered, the latter horn balanced and ending at the top of the fuselage. There is a small underfin. The GX version introduced a long, integrated dorsal fin. The G3 Mirage has a tricycle undercarriage with cantilever legs mounted to the fuselage and with faired wheels. The Remos is somewhat unusual among modern certificated/LSA aircraft in that it can be flown with the doors removed.

The prototype and most production Mirages have been powered by 80 hp or 100 hp variants of the Rotax 912 flat four engine. The Mirage RS/L version had a Jabiru 2200 and one aircraft (D-MPCJ) had a two-cylinder, 72 hp Swiss Auto SAB 430 turbocharged car engine, which saved 30 kg (66 lb).

The G3 Mirage first flew on 20 September 1997 with the lower powered Rotax. The first production aircraft also used this engine but had some small horizontal control surface modifications plus the addition of a horn balance to the rudder.

The GX had been the current production model since 2006 and features folding wings and monocoque carbon fiber construction. Its wing has a different airfoil than the G3, improving roll rate and giving better penetration of turbulence. The GX is fitted with either a Junkers or BRS ballistic parachute recovery system.

The GX2009 was introduced at the Sebring Expo. There were improvements to the instrument panel and interior and a new chromoly steel tube landing gear, which replaced the earlier composite undercarriage, is retrofitable to older models.

== Operational history ==
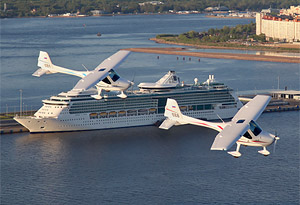
Remos GXs over the seaport of Saint-Petersburg, Russia

The G3 Mirage/GX has been produced to meet both European ultralight and US LSA regulations. By early 2009, over 300 of all aircraft variants had been sold worldwide. About half were in Europe: in mid-2010 there were 156 G3 and GX aircraft on European civil registers west of Russia. The rest went to countries including New Zealand, Thailand and the United States. Mirages were also sold to police forces in Argentina and to a military agency in Romania.

An analysis of the operating economics by Aviation Consumer magazine of the G3 versus the Cessna 152 in flight school use during 2013 showed that the G3 cost 50% more to operate than the thirty-year-old Cessna did.

== Variants ==
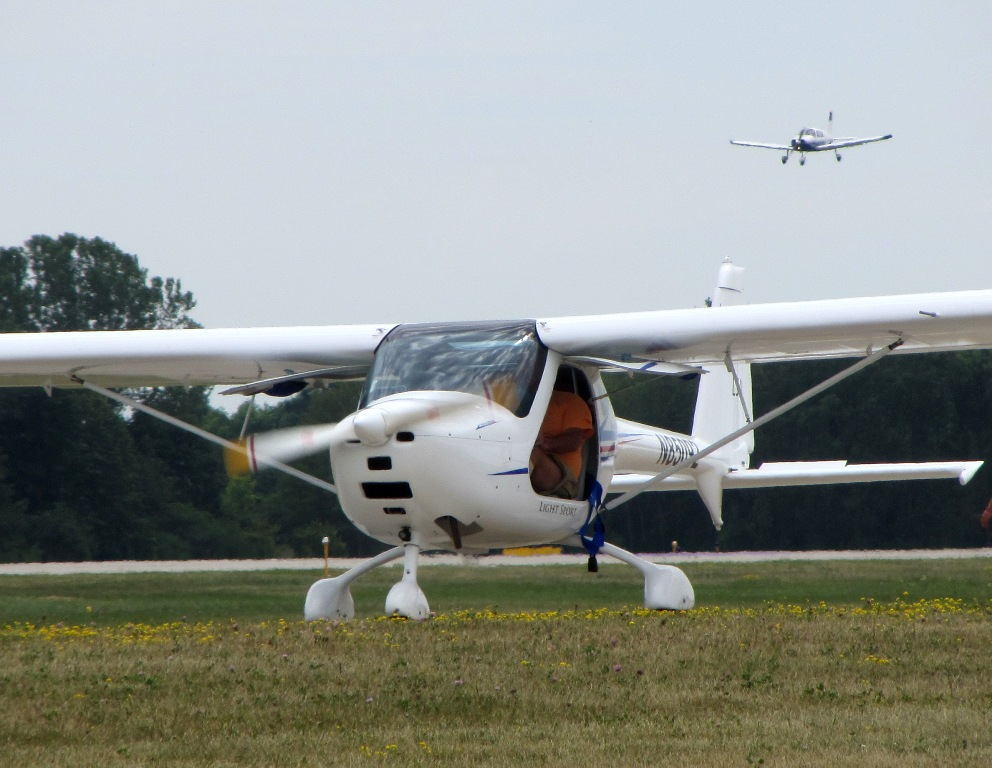
G3/600

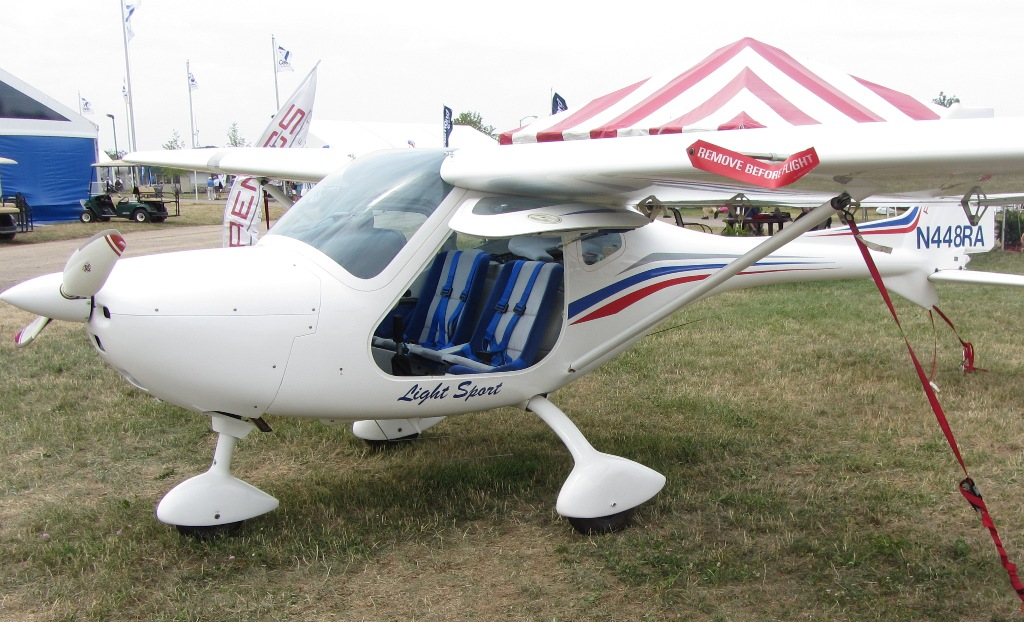
Remos GX

Data from Jane's All the World's Aircraft 2010/11

G3 Mirage
First production version with 60 kW (80 hp) Rotax 912 engine, 1999
G3 Mirage S
100 hp (75 kW) Rotax 912 ULS engine, 1999
G3 Mirage RS
Changes to rudder and undercarriage, roof window added, 2001
G3 Mirage RS/L
85 hp (63 kW) Jabiru 2200A engine, lightened by 10 kg (22 lb), 2003
G3 Mirage ARF
Kit built, almost ready-to-fly, 2003
G3/600
Changes to take advantage of the increased ultralight maximum takeoff weight (472.5 kg, 1,042 lb) allowed by 2003 regulations, 2004
G3 RaLi
Marketed by Jordanian Aerospace Industries 2004-6
GX
Current (2010) version introduced in 2006, with new carbon fibre wing; more integrated fuselage with dorsal fin and more storage space; ground adjustable pitch propeller
GX eLite
Version lightened by 20 kg (44 lb) for the European Fédération Aéronautique Internationale microlight category, with an empty weight of 286 kg (631 lb) and a gross weight of 472.5 kg (1,042 lb). The standard engine available is the 80 hp (60 kW) Rotax 912UL.
GXNXT
Introduced in 2011 and marketed in the US as the GXnXES. The standard engines available are the 80 hp (60 kW) Rotax 912UL and the 100 hp (75 kW) Rotax 912ULS

== Specifications (Remos GX) ==
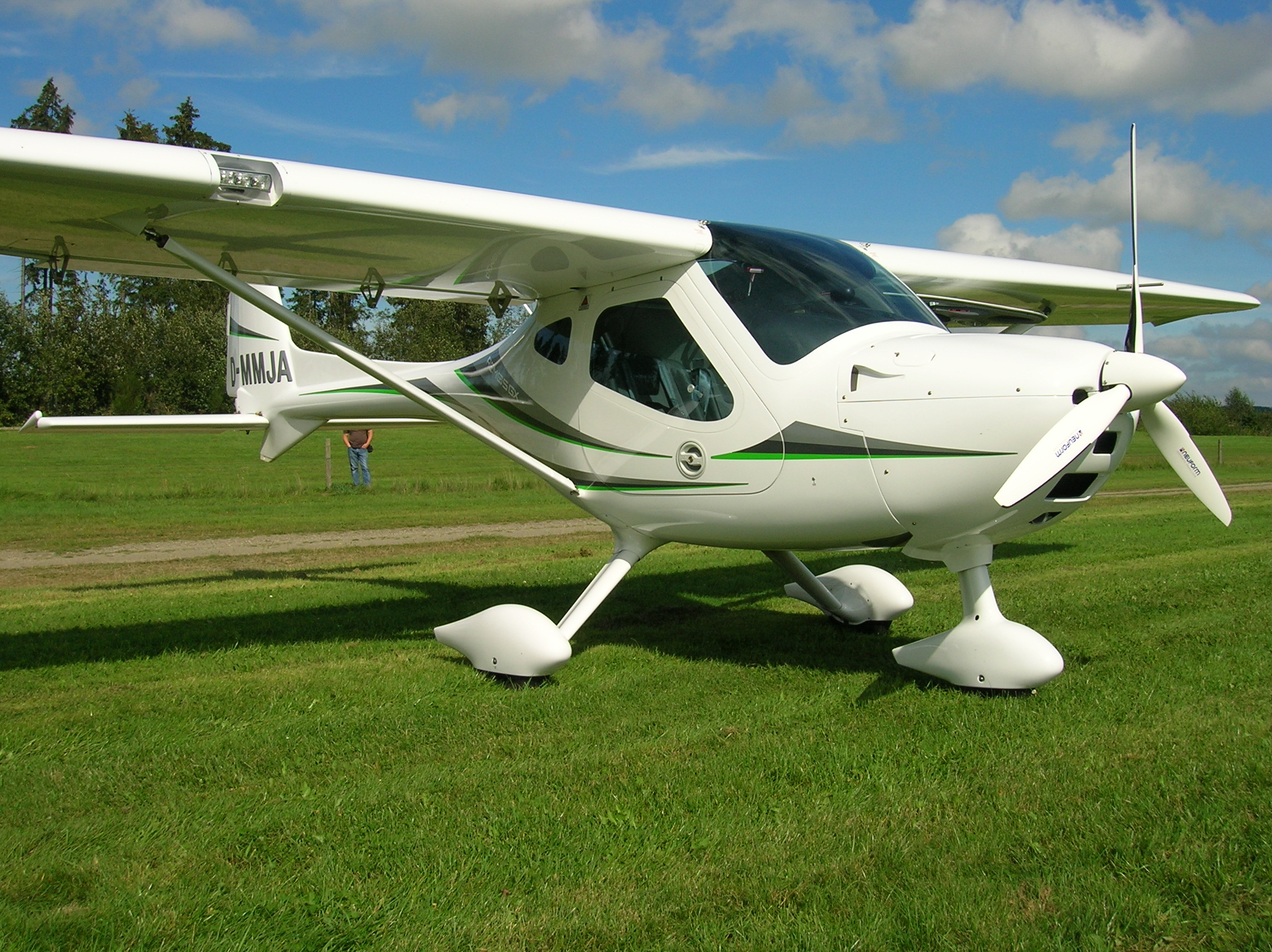
Remos GX

Data from Remos Website

General characteristics

- Crew: one
- Capacity: one passenger
- Length: 21 ft 3 in (6.48 m)
- Wingspan: 30 ft 6 in (9.30 m)
- Height: 7 ft 5 in (2.26 m)
- Wing area: 118 sq ft (11.0 m^{2})
- Empty weight: 705 lb (320 kg)
- Gross weight: 1,320 lb (599 kg)
- Fuel capacity: 21 US gallons (79.49 litres) usable
- Powerplant: 1 × Rotax 912ULS four cylinder horizontally opposed aircraft engine, 100 hp (75 kW)

Performance

- Cruise speed: 123 mph (198 km/h, 107 kn)
- Stall speed: 44 mph (71 km/h, 38 kn) with full flaps
- Range: 550 mi (890 km, 480 nmi)
- Endurance: 6.0 hours
- Service ceiling: 15,000 ft (4,600 m)
- g limits: +4/-2
- Maximum glide ratio: 10:1
- Rate of climb: 1,280 ft/min (6.5 m/s)
