= Stemme ASP S15 =

German touring motor glider, 2009

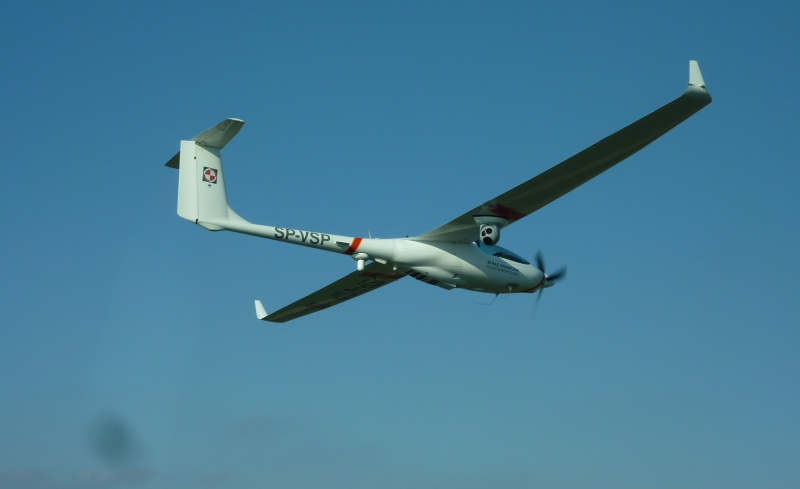
- ASP S15-1 Stemme belonging to the Border Guard

General information
- Type: Motor glider
- National origin: Germany
- Manufacturer: Stemme

History
- First flight: 2009
- Developed into: Safran Patroller

The Stemme ASP S15 is a German two-seat powered sailplane designed and built by Stemme for use as an Airborne Systems Platform.

== Design and development ==
The ASP S15 is a two-seat single-engined, all composite construction, powered sailplane with the engine mounted in the center fuselage. The cockpit has room for two in side-by-side configuration. It has a shoulder wing, a conventional T-tail and a retractable nose wheel landing gear. It can also be fitted with a 2-axis autopilot and external underwing payload pods.

The ASP S15-1 was granted a restricted type certificate by the European Aviation Safety Agency in October 2013.

== Variant ==
ASP S15-1
Airborne Systems Platform which can be fitted with a 2-axis autopilot and external underwing payload pods.

== Specifications ==
Data from

General characteristics

- Crew: 1 pilot
- Capacity: 1 passenger
- Length: 8.52 m (27 ft 11 in)
- Wingspan: 18 m (59 ft 1 in)
- Height: 2.45 m (8 ft 0 in)
- Wing area: 17.4 m^{2} (187 sq ft)
- Max takeoff weight: 1,100 kg (2,425 lb)
- Powerplant: 1 × Rotax 914 F2 , 84.5 kW (113.3 hp)
- Propellers: 3-bladed Mühlbauer Type MTV-7-A / 170/051, 1.7 m (5 ft 7 in) diameter

Performance

- Never exceed speed: 265 km/h (165 mph, 143 kn)
