= List of gliders (B) =

This is a list of gliders/sailplanes of the world, (this reference lists all gliders with references, where available) Note: Any aircraft can glide for a short time, but gliders are designed to glide for longer.

== B ==
=== Babiński ===
(Zbigniew Babiński)

- Babiński 1912 glider
- Babiński 1913 glider
- Babiński II

=== BAC ===
(British Aircraft Company)

- B.A.C. I
- B.A.C. II
- B.A.C. III
- B.A.C. IV
- B.A.C. V
- B.A.C. VI
- B.A.C. VII
- B.A.C. VII Planette
- B.A.C. VIII Bat-Boat
- B.A.C. IX
- B.A.C. Drone

=== Bacerka ===
- Bacerka (glider)

=== Bachem ===
(Eric Bachem / Bachem-Werke)

- Bachem Leichtwindensegler
- Bachem Lerche
- Bachem Thermikus

=== Backstrom ===
(Al Backstrom)

- Backstrom EPB-1 Flying Plank
- Backstrom WPB-1 Powered Plank
- Backstrom Flying Plank II

=== Baden-Baden ===
(Segelflugzeugwerke Baden-Baden)

- Baden-Baden glider

=== Bagalini ===
(BAGALINI, Marino)

- Bagalini Bagaliante
- Bagalini Colombo

=== Bailey-Moyes ===
(Bob Bailey / Moyes Microlights Pty Ltd)

- Bailey-Moyes Tempest

=== Baitler ===
(Miroslav Baitler / I. skupina konstruktérů Aero, Praha (Prague))

- Můra 1922

=== Baker McMillen ===
(Frank Gröss / Baker McMillen)

- Baker McMillen Cadet

=== Ball ===
(James Noel Ball)

- Ball 1929 glider
- Ball 1930 glider

=== Bange ===
(John J. Bange)

- Bange 1936 glider
- Bange Azure Star

=== Bange ===
(John J. Bange - Clifton, Queensland, Australia)

- Bange Azure Star (Bange Z-B-I)
- Bange Azure Star II (Bange Z-B-II)

=== Bango-Schmid ===
(Bango & Schmid)

- Bango-Schmid 1930 glider

=== Barbat-Dunn-Rigby ===
(BARBAT, Edward & DUNN, Colin & RIGBY, Colin)

- Barbat-Dunn-Rigby GBDR

=== Bărboi ===
(Ion Bărboi)

- Bărboi 1932 glider
- Bărboi 1934 glider

=== Bardin ===
(René Bardin)

- Bardin Alérion
- Bardin Alérion Biplace
- Bardin B-1 Vauville

=== Barel ===
(Graal Aéro / Max Barel)

- Barel Graal

=== Barnaby ===
(Ralph Barnaby)

- Ralph Barnaby 1909 glider

=== Baron ===
(A. Baron)

- Baron Aéro Ramo-Planeur

=== Barratt-Bradley ===
(Jock Barratt & Harold Bradley / Waikerie Gliding Club)

- Barratt-Bradley Pelican 2

=== Barros ===
(Cláudio Pinto de Barros / Centro de Estudos Aeronáuticos (CEA) / Universidade Federal de Minas Gerais (UFMG), Bello Horizonte, Brazil)

- Barros CB-1 Gaivota

=== Barszczowski ===
(Walenty Barszczowski)

- Barszczowski 1913 Glider

=== Barta ===
(Karl Barta)

- Barta Dactylus 2
- Barta Dactylus 3

=== Bartel ===
(Ryszard Bartel)

- Bartel 1 Glider
- Bartel 2 Glider

=== Bartos/Nobel ===
- Bartos/Nobel BN-1 Phantom

=== Bates ===
(Carl Stephen BATES, Clear Lake, Iowa (USA) / Popular Mechanics)

- Popular Mechanics Glider

=== Baudoux-Orta ===
(Pierre Baudoux & José Orta / Ateliers Orta, Saint-Hubert, Belgium)

- Baudoux-Orta SBO

=== Ted Bauer ===
(Ted Bauer / San Gabriel Academy students, Californie, USA)

- Bauer Bird

=== Bäumer ===
(Bäumer Aero GmbH, Hamburg / Paul Bäumer)

- Bäumer B-1 Roter Vogel

=== Bazin ===
(Albert Bazin)

- Bazin 1904
- Bazin 1905
- Bazin 1909

=== Bazzocchi ===
(Ermanno Bazzocchi)

- Bazzocchi EB.1 Littore
- Bazzocchi EB.2

=== Bauer ===
- Bauer Bz.II

=== Beatty-Johl ===
- Beatty-Johl BJ-2 Assegai
- Beatty-Johl BJ-3
- Beatty-Johl BJ-4

=== Beaufort Gliding Club ===
(Lyon, Douglas – Beaufort Gliding Club, Victoria, Australia)

- Beaufort Gliding Club Zephyrus
- Beaufort Gliding Club Phoenix

=== Bede ===
(Jim Bede)

- Bede BD-2
- Bede BD-5S

=== Bekmanis ===
(Edvins Bekmanis)

- Bekmanis Gaigalina
- Bekmanis Spriditis

=== Bėkšta ===
(Romualdas Bėkšta)

- Bėkšta RB-11

=== Belin brothers. ===
- Belin bros. 1908 glider

=== Bellanger-Denhaut ===
(DENHAUT, François - BELLANGER Frères)

- Bellanger-Denhaut BD-1

=== Belyayev ===
(Viktor Nikolayevich Belyayev)

- Belyayev BP-3
- Belyayev EF-1
- Belyayev EF-2

=== Benes ===
(Pavel Beneš)

- Benes LD 605 Haban - post-war military assault glider under construction, but cancelled 1951

=== Bennett-Carter ===
(George Bennett & Richard Carter)

- Bennett-Carter Dottie S

=== Benz ===
(Ing. Hans Benz, Mönchen-Gladbach.)

- Benz Be-2

=== Berca ===
(Jorge Berca)

- Berca JB-1
- Berca JB-2
- Berca JB-3
- Berca JB-4

=== Berger ===
(M. Berger in Lyon and flown by Gardey)

- Berger 1905 glider

=== Berkshire ===
(Berkshire Manufacturing Corporation)

- Berkshire Concept 70

=== Berkout ===
- Berkout (glider)

=== Berliaux-Salètes ===
- Berliaux-Salètes 1909 glider no.1
- Berliaux-Salètes 1909 Pourquoi Pas? II

=== Berliner Segelflugvereins ===
- Berliner Segelflugvereins 1923 primary

=== Bertelli ===
- Bertelli Aerostave

=== Bertin ===
(Bertin (glider constructor))

- Bertin Compact
- Bertin B-12

=== Besneux ===
(Alain Besneux)

- Besneux P.70

=== Bielany School ===
- Bielany School Glider

=== Bikle ===
(Paul Bikle)

- Bikle T-6

=== Bilski ===
- Bilski Mewa (Gull) No.14 – Second Polish Glider Contest 17 May – 15 June 1925

=== Bína ===
(Karel Bína / B. Metyš & J. Litomyšl Matoušek)

- Bína Litomyšl-1

=== Binder ===
- Binder EB28
- Binder EB29
- Binder ASH-25 EB28

=== Biot ===
- Biot Massia

=== Birdman ===
(Birdman Enterprises)

- Birdman Project 102 Windsoar

=== Birmingham Guild ===
- Birmingham Guild BG-100
- Birmingham Guild BG-135

=== Birò Regina ===
- Birò Regina

=== Birrlauf ===
(Benny Birrlauf)

- Birrlauf Beny I
- Birrlauf Gerspach

=== Bisser ===
- Bisser – Bulgaria

=== Bistrama & Puławski ===
- Bistrama & Puławski SL-3 No.8 – Second Polish Glider Contest 17 May – 15 June 1925

=== Blaicher ===
(Michal Blaicher)

- Blaicher B.1
- Blaicher B-38

=== Bland ===
(Lilian E. Bland – Ireland)

- Bland Mayfly

=== Błażyński ===
(Alojzy Błażyński)

- Błażyński Polon – First Polish Glider Contest August 1923

=== Bleriot ===
(Louis Blériot)

- Blériot II

=== Blessing ===
(Gerhard Blessing / Sportverein Merseburg)

- Blessing Rebell
- Blessing V-7 Gleiter-Max
- Blessing Kolibri-B
- Blessing Falter-Scooter

=== Bley ===
(Bley Flugzeugbau GmbH, Naumberg)

- Bley M-Condor

=== Blogoslawienstwo ===
- Blogoslawienstwo

=== Blohm & Voss ===
- Blohm & Voss BV 40
- Blohm & Voss BV 246

=== Bock ===
(John W. Bock)

- Bock 1

=== Boeing ===
- Boeing Steel Truss Glider

=== Bohatyrew ===
(Michal Bohatyrew)

- Bohatyrew Motyl
- Bohatyrew Miś (Miś - Teddy Bear) (No.12) – Second Polish Glider Contest 17 May – 15 June 1925

=== Bohemia ===
(HALLER, Oldřich)

- Bohemia B.5

=== Böhm ===
- Böhm Schmankerl foot-launched rigid flying wing glider

=== Bölkow ===
- Bölkow Phönix
- Bölkow Phoebus

=== Bolton ===
- Bolton 1932

=== Bonn ===
- Bonn Helge
- Bonn I Vulkan
- Bonn Schlägel und Eisen

=== Bonnet ===
(Pierre Bonnet - Louis Clément - Henri Mignet)

- Bonnet double monoplan
- Bonnet-Clément BC-1
- Bonnet-Clément BC-7
- Bonnet-Mignet 1923 glider

=== Bonnet-Labranche ===
(Émile Bonnet-Labranche / Ateliers vosgiens Saint Dié)

- Bonnet-Labranche 1909 glider

=== Bonomi ===
(Aeronautica Bonomi)

- Bossi-Bonomi Pedaliante
- Bonomi BS.2 Balestruccio
- Bonomi BS.4 Basettino
- Bonomi BS.5 Ballerina
- Bonomi BS.7 Allievo Italia
- Bonomi BS.8 Biancone
- Bonomi BS.9 Bertina
- Bonomi BS.10 Ardea
- Bonomi BS.11 Milano
- Bonomi BS.12 Roma
- Bonomi BS.14 Astore
- Bonomi BS.15 Bigiarella
- Bonomi BS.16 Allievo Bonomi
- Bonomi BS.17 Allievo Cantù
- Bonomi BS.18 Airone
- Bonomi BS.19 Alca
- Bonomi BS.20 Albanella
- Bonomi BS.22 Alzavola
- Bonomi BS.24 Biposto Roma
- Bonomi BS.28 Alcione
- Bonomi BS.28 Aerodinamico

=== Borchn-Anemon ===
(BORCHN, A. A. & ANEMON, O. K.)

- Borchn-Anemon BA-1 Tandem (Борчн- Анмонов БА-1)

=== Borghese ===
- Borghese 1931 hyydroglider

=== Borzecki ===
(Jozef Borzecki)

- Borzecki Alto-Stratus
- Borzecki Cirrus
- Borzecki JB-4 Skowronek
- Borzecki Stratus

=== Bottini ===
- Bottini Mabo

=== Boulay-Ferrier ===
(Jacques Boulay & Hubert Ferrier)

- Boulay-Ferrier Condor

=== Boulay-Menin ===
(Jacques Boulay & Menin)

- Boulay-Menin BM-1

=== Bourieau-Chapautau ===
- Bourieau-Chapautau glider

=== Bowers (glider constructor) ===
- Bowers Bantam

=== Bowlus ===
(Michael Bowlus)

- Bowlus BZ-1

=== Bowlus-du Pont ===
(William Hawley Bowlus)

- Bowlus M1-PU3
- Bowlus 1912 glider
- Bowlus Albatross 1 Falcon
- Bowlus Albatross 2
- Bowlus Albatross Senior
- Bowlus Dragontross
- Bowlus Flying Wing
- Bowlus Super Albatross
- Bowlus Super Sailplane
- Bowlus 1-S-2100 Senior Albatross
- Bowlus BA-100 Baby Albatross
- Bowlus BA-102 Two-place Baby Albatross
- Bowlus BS-100 Super Albatross
- Bowlus BT-100 Baby Albatross
- Bowlus BTS-100 Two-place Baby Albatross
- Bowlus G-100 Galloping Gertie
- Bowlus-Criz MC-1
- Bowlus-Criz MC-1 1/2 scale
- Bowlus SP-1 Paper Wing
- Bowlus XCG-7
- Bowlus XCG-8
- Bowlus XCG-16
- Bowlus/Nelson Dragonfly
- Bowlus XBM-5 -
- Bowlus XTG-12 TG-12 - 1942 Bowlus XBM-5,2-seat tandem-seat, mid-wing training glider, XBM-5 = Experimental Bowlus Military, Design number 5
- Bowlus TG-12A: unrelated Bowlus-DuPont built M1PU3** 'Utility', 1 impressed ([designer Heath] McDowell, 1-place, Utility, 3rd design [?])

=== Bramingham ===
- Bramingham 1934 glider

=== Bräutigam ===
(Bernhard Bräutigam / Flugzeugbau Braütigam G.m.b.H. Weimar)

- Bräutigam Super Orchidee (D-STURM regn.)

=== Brditschka ===
(Heinz Brditschka)

- Brditschka Raab Krähe
- Brditschka-Militki MB-E1 Electric One
- Brditschka HB-21
- Brditschka HB-22
- Brditschka HB-23

=== Breeze ===
- Breeze Oozle Bird

=== Bréguet ===
(Société anonyme des ateliers d'aviation Louis Breguet)

- Bréguet Br 900 Louisette
- Bréguet Br 901 Mouette
- Bréguet Br 902 Cinzano
- Bréguet Br 903
- Bréguet Br 904 Nymphale
- Bréguet Br 905 Fauvette
- Bréguet Br 906 Choucas
- Bréguet Br 907
- Bréguet Colibri
- Bréguet P-1
- Bréguet P-2

=== Bremen-Lane ===
- Bremen-Lane glider

=== Bremer ===
(Karl Bremer)

- Bremer Max
- Bremer Strolch
- Bremer Motorisiert SG-38

=== Briegleb ===
(William G. Briegleb)

- Briegleb BG-01 Utility
- Briegleb BG-02
- Briegleb BG-03
- Briegleb BG-04
- Briegleb BG-06
- Briegleb BG-07
- Briegleb BG-08
- Briegleb BG-12
- Briegleb BG-16
- NASA Dryden-Briegleb M2-F1
- Briegleb TG-9

=== Briffaud ===
(Georges Briffaud)

- Briffaud GB.1
- Briffaud GB.2
- Briffaud GB.9
- Briffaud GB.80 Aérovoilier

=== Bright Star ===
- Bright Star Swift

=== Bristol ===
(Bristol Aeronautical Corporation)

- Bristol XLRQ

=== Bristol ===
(Bristol Aeroplane Company)

- Bristol Glider (1910)

=== Brno ===
(Brno Technical university)

- Brno Technical university ASP-3 – (a.k.a. NSv-3 Cyrillic acronym)

=== Broburn ===
(Broburn Sailplanes Ltd, Woodley)

- Broburn Wanderlust

=== Brochet ===
(Avions Maurice Brochet / Constructions Aéronautiques Maurice Brochet)

- Brochet Beynes-CAU
- Brochet Brocheteau
- Brochet MB-10 Ginette
- Brochet MB-20

=== Brochocki ===
(Stefan Brochocki, Witold Kasper and A. Bodek)

- Brochocki BKB-1

=== Brokker (glider constructor) ===
- Brokker (glider)

=== Brondel ===
(Christian Brondel)

- Brondel Cavok 10
- Brondel CB-12
- Brondel CB-15 Crystal
- Brondel Hélium
- Brondel ST-11
- Brondel ST-12
- Brondel ST-15

=== Brookes ===
(Wilfred Brookes)

- Brookes 1919 glider

=== Brown ===
(Vincent Brown & STC-GC (Sydney Technical College Gliding Club))

- Brown Two Seater
- Brown Rebel

=== Brown ===
(Leeroy Brown/ Southdown SkySailing Club)

- Brown 1931 glider

=== Bruni ===
(Giovanni Bruni / Aéroclub Vergiate)

- Bruni 3V-1 Eolo

=== Bryan Aircraft Company ===
See Schreder.

=== Brylinski ===
(Brylinski, Jacques & Wehrle, Jean)

- Brylinski JJ-2
- Brylinski JJ-3
- Brylinski Petrel

=== BS (glider constructor) ===
- BS 1K

=== BSV ===
(Berliner Segelflugvereins - HOHMUTH, Otto)

- BSV 1923 glider
- BSV Luftikus

=== Buchanan ===
(John Buchanan)

- Buchanan Ricochet

=== Bucher Leichtbau ===
(Heinrich Bucher) see Farner

=== Budig ===
(Friedrich Wilhelm Budig)

- Budig 1921 glider

=== Bums ===
- Bums glider
- Bünzli

(Bunzli, Henri René / Société de Construction d'Appareils Aériens, Levallois)

- Bünzli 1908 glider

=== Burbulmate ===
- Burbulmate

=== Busso ===
- Busso San Giorgio

=== Butterworth-Ypinazar ===
- Butterworth-Ypinazar Primary

=== Buxton ===
(G. Mungo Buxton)

- Buxton Hjordis
- Buxton Hjordis 2
- Buxton B-5
- Buxton Tailless Tailless

=== Buxton ===
(Jay Buxton)

- Buxton Roundair – Jay Buxton
- Buxton Transporter – Jay Buxton

=== Bydgoszczy ===
- Bydgoszczy Żabuś
