= Bertelli =

Bertelli is an Italian surname. Notable people with the surname include:

- Agostino Bertelli (1727–1776), Italian painter
- Augustus Cesare Bertelli (1890–1979), Anglo-Italian car designer, racing driver and businessman
- Angelo Bertelli (1921–1999), American college football player
- Cristofano Bertelli (fl. c. 1525), Italian engraver
- Ferrando Bertelli (c. 1525–after 1572), Italian engraver
- Flavio Bertelli (1865–1941), Italian painter
- Francesco Bertelli (1794–1844), Italian astronomer
- Ivam Bertelli (born 1955), Brazilian hammer thrower
- Luca Bertelli (fl. 1564–1589), Italian engraver
- Luigi Bertelli (in art known as Vamba; 1858–1920), Italian author, illustrator and journalist
- Maria Bertelli (born 1977), British volleyball player
- Patrizio Bertelli (born 1946), CEO of Prada Group and husband to Miuccia Prada
- Renato Bertelli (1900–1974), Italian artist
- Vasco Giuseppe Bertelli (1924−2013), Italian Catholic priest

== See also ==
- Berte (disambiguation)
