= BS10 =

BS10 may refer to:

- BS10, a BS postcode area for Bristol, England
- Bonomi BS.10 Ardea, a glider
- BS 10 Tables of Pipe Flanges, a British Standard
- BS10, a Japanese satellite channel
