= BS12 =

BS12 may refer to:

- IBM Business System 12, an early relational database management system
- BS 12 Specification for Portland Cement, a British Standard
- Bonomi BS.12 Roma, a primary glider
- Omega BS-12, a utility helicopter
- BS12 TwellV, a Japanese satellite television channel
