= BS9 =

BS9 may refer to:

- BS9, a BS postcode area for Bristol, England
- Bonomi BS.9 Bertina, a glider
- BS 9 Specification and Sections of Bull Head Railway Rails, a British Standard
