= BS14 =

BS14 may refer to:

- BS14, a BS postcode area for Bristol, England
- Bonomi BS.14 Astore, a glider
- BS-14 María Pita, a Spanish Maritime Safety and Rescue Society tugboat
- BS 14 Specification for Structural Steel for Marine Boilers, a British Standard
- Omega BS-14 Falcon, a helicopter
