= BS11 =

BS11 may refer to:

- BS11, a BS postcode area for Bristol, England
- BS11, a Nippon BS Broadcasting satellite television channel
- BS 11 Specifications and Sections of Flat Bottom Railway Rails, a British Standard
- Bonomi BS.11 Milano, a primary glider
- BS-11 Numerical 11 point box Pain scale
- BS-11 Don Inda, a Spanish Maritime Safety and Rescue Society tugboat
- BS 11, a Royal Lao Army Airborne Border Police Special Battalion
