= BS8 =

BS8 may refer to:

- BS8, a BS postcode area for Bristol, England
- BS 8 Specification for Tubular Tramway Poles, a British Standard
- Bonomi BS.8 Biancone, a glider
