= BS16 =

BS16 may refer to:

- BS16, a BS postcode area for Bristol, England
- BS 16 Specification for telegraph material, a British Standard
- Bonomi BS.16 Allievo Bonomi, a primary glider
