= BS22 =

BS22 may refer to:

- BS22, a BS postcode area for Bristol, England
- Bonomi BS.22 Alzavola, a motor glider
- BS-22 María Zambrano, a Spanish Maritime Safety and Rescue Society tugboat
- BS 22 Report on Effect of Temperature on Insulating Materials, a British Standard
