= BS28 =

BS28 may refer to:

- BS28, a BS postcode area for Bristol, England
- Bonomi BS.28 Alcione and B.28 Aerodinamico, gliders
- BS 28 Report on Nuts, Bolt Heads and Spanners, a British Standard
