= BS6 =

BS6 may refer to:

- BS6, a BS postcode area for Bristol, England
- BS6, a center drill bit size
- Brilliance BS6, a Chinese car
- BS 6 Properties of Rolled Sections for Structural Purposes, a British Standard
- BS-VI Bharat Stage emission standards in India
- Bonomi BS.6 Bigiarella, an Italian glider
