= BS4 =

BS4 or BS-4 may refer to:

- BS4, a BS postcode area for Bristol, England
- BS-4, Biuro Szyfrów 4, the German section of the Polish Cipher Bureau
- BS4, a center drill bit size
- B-s4, a variant of the Antonov A-1 aircraft
- BS 4 Specification for Structural Steel Sections, a British Standard
- Bonomi BS.4 Basettino, an Italian primary glider in the 1930s
- Brilliance BS4, a 2007 Chinese car
- BS-IV Bharat Stage emission standards in India
- BS4, a brass left-hand threaded Gas cylinder valve
- Beautiful Soup, imported as bs4, an HTML and XML parser written in the Python programming language
