= BS24 =

BS24 may refer to:

- BS24, a BS postcode area for Bristol, England
- Bonomi BS.24 Biposto Roma, a glider
- BS 24 Specifications for Material used in the Construction of Standards for Railway Rolling Stock, a British Standard
