= BS15 =

BS15 may refer to:

- BS15, a BS postcode area for Bristol, England
- Bonomi BS.15 Bigiarella, a glider
- BS-15 Sar Gavia, a Spanish Maritime Safety and Rescue Society tugboat
- BS 15 Specification for Structural Steel for Bridges, etc., a British Standard
- BS15, a left-hand threaded valve for gas cylinders
