= Brylinski =

Brylinski or Bryliński is a Polish surname. It is the surname of:

- Artur Bryliński, Polish crime victim who killed his persecutors and whose story inspired The Debt (1999 film)
- Jacques Brylinski, glider designer
- Jean-Luc Brylinski (born 1951), French-American mathematician, husband of Ranee
- Maxim Brylinski, Ukrainian violinist who won second prize in the 2002 Paganini Competition
- Paweł Bryliński (1814–1890), Polish folk-sculptor
- Ranee Brylinski (born 1957), American mathematician, wife of Jean-Luc
- Robert Bryliński, competitor at 2011 European Athletics U23 Championships – Men's 400 metres hurdles and several other events
- Stanisław Bryliński, actor in Polish silent film Pan Twardowski (1921 film)
