= Bonomi BS.18 Airone =

BS.18 Airone

General information
- Type: Training glider
- National origin: Italy
- Manufacturer: Aeronautica Bonomi
- Designer: Camillo Silva
- Number built: 1

History
- First flight: 1936

The Bonomi BS.18 Airone (English: Heron) was a single seat training glider, designed in Italy in 1936. Only one was built.

== Design and development ==
The Airone was an attempt to produce a training glider similar to the BS.8 Biancone but with a better glide ratio. It used the wings of the Biancone but had the more refined fuselage of the BS.10 Ardea. The wing bracing and the empennage was new.

The wing was a wooden two spar structure, largely fabric covered. The forward spar was close to the leading edge; from it forward around the edge the wing was plywood covered, forming a torque-resistant D-box; aft the covering was fabric. The rear spar was just behind mid-chord. The central panel, occupying a little under half the span, was straight edged and had constant chord. Outboard the wing was straight tapered to rounded tips, ailerons occupying all the trailing edge. The centre section was supported by a low fuselage pedestal and braced on each side with a parallel pair of steel struts. These were fixed to the two spars close to the outer ends of the centre panels and to the lower fuselage.

The Airone had a deep sided, hexagonal cross-section fuselage, entirely plywood skinned. Its pilot sat in a small, deep cockpit, head against the front of the pedestal and partly protected from the airstream by the upper fuselage panels, which both lifted off for entry. There was a conventional single skid undercarriage under the forward fuselage aft to the wing trailing edge, with a small tailskid. The fuselage tapered gently to the tail, where the horizontal surfaces, braced and straight edged but with elliptical tips were mounted on top of a short fin. The elevators used a thick aerofoil for efficiency and had a cut-out for the balanced rudder. This was large, extending down to the keel with straight edges and rounded corners.

The BS.18 Airone first flew in 1936 but only one was built.

== Specifications ==
Data from Pedrielli (2011) p.97

General characteristics

- Crew: One
- Length: 6.79 m (22 ft 3 in)
- Wingspan: 13.37 m (43 ft 10 in)
- Wing area: 14.50 m^{2} (156.1 sq ft)
- Aspect ratio: 12.40
- Empty weight: 108 kg (238 lb)
- Gross weight: 183 kg (403 lb)

Performance

- Maximum glide ratio: 18:1 estimated
- Rate of sink: 0.76 m/s (150 ft/min)
- Wing loading: 12.60 kg/m^{2} (2.58 lb/sq ft)
