= BS13 =

BS13 may refer to:

- BS13, a BS postcode area for Bristol, England
- BS-13 María de Maeztu, a Spanish Maritime Safety and Rescue Society tugboat
- BS 13 Specification for Structural Steel for Shipbuilding, a British Standard
