= Bowlus BS-100 Super Albatross =

American glider

BS-100 Super Albatross
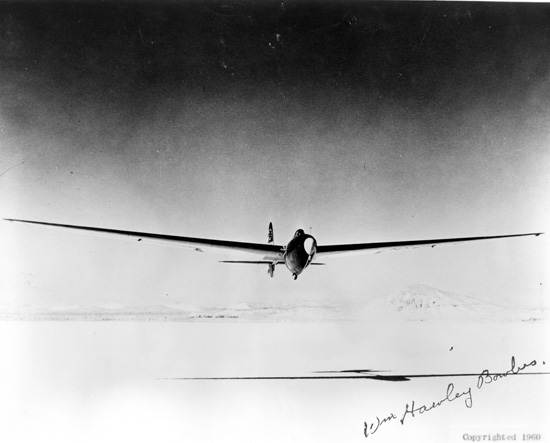
- A Bowlus BS-100 Super Albatross in flight

General information
- Type: Glider
- National origin: United States
- Designer: Hawley Bowlus
- Number built: 2

History
- First flight: 1938
- Developed from: Bowlus BA-100 Baby Albatross

The Bowlus BS-100 Super Albatross is a single seat, mid-wing glider that was designed by Hawley Bowlus in 1938.

== Design and development ==
The Super Albatross was created from a Baby Albatross fuselage pod and tail boom. The wings used the outer panels of the Senior Albatross. The resulting aircraft was of wooden construction, with the wings and tail surfaces covered in aircraft fabric. The tail boom is a metal tube.

Only two examples were constructed. The first was built by Bowlus and features an all-flying horizontal stabilizer. The second was built by Frank Kelsey and has a fixed horizontal stabilizer and flaps in addition to spoilers.

== Aircraft on display ==
- National Soaring Museum
- US Southwest Soaring Museum

== Specifications (Super Albatross) ==
Data from Soaring

General characteristics

- Crew: one
- Wingspan: 45 ft 0 in (13.72 m)
- Wing area: 125 sq ft (11.6 m^{2})
- Aspect ratio: 15.7
- Airfoil: Gö 549, with the wingtips having a symmetrical airfoil
- Empty weight: 435 lb (197 kg)
- Gross weight: 645 lb (293 kg)

Performance

- Maximum glide ratio: 29:1 at 47 mph
- Rate of sink: 150 ft/min (0.76 m/s) at 42 mph
- Wing loading: 5.25 lb/sq ft (25.6 kg/m^{2})
