= Luca Bertelli =

Luca Bertelli was an Italian engraver and printseller of the Renaissance. He was probably a relation of Ferrando Bertelli. Bertelli is known to have been active from around 1564 to around 1589. Some of his work displays affinities with Mannerism.

Among his prints are:

- Bust of Hippolita Gonzaga.
- The Israelites tormented by Serpents after Michelangelo.
- The Baptism of Christ.
- Christ washing his Disciples' feet.
- The Flagellation.
- The Crucifixion.
- The Descent from the Cross;
- The Four Evangelists; after Coxcyen.
- The Last Judgment; after J.B. Fontana.
- A Woman and Children warming themselves by a Fire; after Titian.
- A portrait of Saint Thomas Aquinas from around 1580.
