= Bonomi BS.24 Biposto Roma =

BS.24 Biposto Roma

General information
- Type: Dual control trainer glider
- National origin: Italy
- Manufacturer: Aeronautica Bonomi
- Designer: Camillo Silva
- Number built: 6

History
- First flight: 1935

The Bonomi BS.24 Biposto Rome (English: Rome two-seater) was an Italian dual control trainer designed for club use. Six were built in the mid-1930s.

== Design and development ==
Camillo Silva designed numerous gliders for Aeronautica Bonomi, but only two of them, the BS.14 Astore and the Biposto Roma were two seaters. When the company started out in 1931, early glider training used single seat primary gliders and the absence of an experienced pilot on board resulted, in England at least, in many injuries and closure of gliding clubs. By 1935 Italian gliding clubs felt a need for dual control aircraft, with good enough performance to take pupils to their C certificates. They were the Biposto Roma's target market.

Despite the partial overlap in names between the Biposto Roma and the earlier BS.12 Roma they had little else in common. In plan, about half of the span of the BS.24's wing was unswept and had constant chord; the outer panels were straight tapered to rounded tips. Ailerons occupied all the trailing edges of these outer panels. There was no dihedral. The wing centre was mounted high above the fuselage on steel struts; in several of his designs Silva had used a cross braced trapezoidal frame for this purpose but the second cockpit, placed at the centre of gravity (c.g.) under the wing, precluded this and instead there were vertical struts behind each cockpit, one to each wing spar and a third, leaning strut from the rear spar. The ends of the spars of the central, constant chord panels were braced to the lower fuselage longerons, directly under the forward wing spar, by asymmetric V-form, faired steel struts.

The Biposto Roma's fuselage was a wooden, rectangular cross section structure, skinned with plywood. Its two cockpits, both open and unscreened, were in tandem. If the aircraft was flown solo it was piloted from the font seat; the occupation or otherwise of the rear cockpit left the trim little changed as it was on the c.g. Under the fuselage a rubber sprung wooden landing skid ran from forward of the cockpits to well aft of the wing trailing edge. The tailplane was triangular, mounted on top of a short, trapezoidal fin and braced to the top of the fuselage. Its elevators had parallel chord and a central cut-out for the rudder, as this, hinged on the fin's trailing edge, was about twice as high as the tailplane. The rudder was straight edged and reached down to the keel; above the tailplane, it had an aerodynamic balance on its upper leading edge.

== Operational history ==
At least five Biposto Romas were used by the Poggio Renatico gliding school.

== Specifications ==
Data from Pedrielli (2011) p.105

General characteristics

- Crew: Two
- Length: 7.21 m (23 ft 8 in)
- Wingspan: 14.18 m (46 ft 6 in)
- Wing area: 21 m^{2} (230 sq ft)
- Aspect ratio: 9.60
- Empty weight: 160 kg (353 lb)
- Gross weight: 310 kg (683 lb)

Performance

- Maximum glide ratio: 16:1 estimated; 9.0:1
- Rate of sink: 0.85 m/s (167 ft/min) , flown solo
- Wing loading: 14.80 kg/m^{2} (3.03 lb/sq ft)
