= Blaicher B.1 =

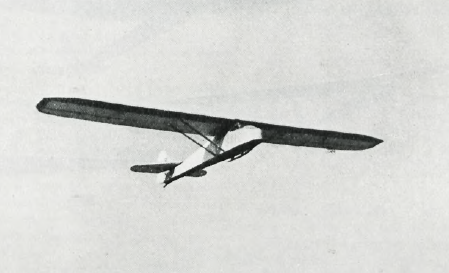

General information
- Type: Intermediate trainer sailplane
- National origin: Poland
- Designer: Michal Blaicher
- Number built: 1

History
- First flight: 29 March 1934

The Blaicher B.1 was a Polish glider first flown in 1934. It was intended to fill an intermediate trainer role, but offered no advance on existing aircraft and only the prototype was completed.

== Design and development ==
In about 1932 the Institute of Gliding Technique (I.T.S.) released a specification for an intermediate glider which resulted in the ITS-II. Michal Blaicher was a glider pioneer in Poland who later was in charge of the Military Gliding Camp (W.O.S.) at Ustianowa. His 1933 design was aimed at the same intermediate class but intended to have better performance than the 1933 Kocjan Komar, which had displaced the ITS-II. It was built in the Lwów workshops of ZASPL, the Aviation Association of students of the Technical University and the oldest aviation organization in Poland, which had also built the ITS-II. The Blaicher B.1's first flight was on 29 March 1934, piloted by its designer. Tests at Ustianowa, flown by Edward Peterek, showed no significant improvement over the Komar so no production resulted, though the sole prototype remained operational for two more years.

The Blaicher B.1 had a two-part, twin spar wing of rectangular plan out to angular tips. It was plywood-covered from the forward spar around the leading edge, forming a D-box. Behind, the wing was fabric covered. It was mounted centrally on a raised, streamlined pedestal which extended aft of the wing, dropping in height, to the tail. Two pairs of parallel struts braced the wing to the lower fuselage. The pilot's open cockpit was immediately ahead of the pedestal and wing leading edge.

The fuselage was hexagonal in section, though dominated by deep, vertical sides and covered with ply forward and fabric aft. A sprung landing skid ran from the nose almost to the trailing edge, aided by a short tailskid. At the rear a triangular tailplane, mounted on top of the fuselage and braced from below with a single strut on each side, carried straight-edged, round tipped elevators with a central cut-out for rudder movement. The fin was very small but mounted a full, rounded and balanced rudder.

== Specifications ==
Data from j2mcl Planeurs

General characteristics

- Crew: One
- Length: 7.18 m (23 ft 7 in)
- Wingspan: 12.7 m (41 ft 8 in)
- Height: 1.5 m (4 ft 11 in)
- Wing area: 17.7 m^{2} (191 sq ft)
- Aspect ratio: 9.1
- Empty weight: 130 kg (287 lb)
- Gross weight: 205 kg (452 lb)

Performance

- Maximum speed: 70 km/h (43 mph, 38 kn)
- Maximum glide ratio: 15.5 at 50 km/h (31 mph; 27 kn) best
- Rate of sink: 0.9 m/s (180 ft/min) minimum at 45 km/h (28 mph; 24 kn)

== See also ==
Related lists

- List of gliders
