= Aeronautica Bonomi =

Aeronautica Vittorio Bonomi was an Italian aircraft manufacturer based in Milan. Established in 1931, the company initially produced two-seat cabin monoplanes before concentrating on sailplanes and gliders. The company was taken over by Aeronautica Lombarda S.A. in 1937.

Aircraft manufactured by Bonomi include:

== Gliders ==
- Bonomi BS.2 Balestruccio
- Bonomi BS.4 Basettino
- Bonomi BS.5 Ballerina
- Bonomi BS.6 Bigiarella
- Bonomi BS.7 Allievo Italia
- Bonomi BS.8 Biancone
- Bonomi BS.9 Bertina
- Bonomi BS.10 Ardea
- Bonomi BS.11 Milano
- Bonomi BS.12 Roma
- Bonomi BS.14 Astore
- Bonomi BS.15 Bigiarella
- Bonomi BS.16 Allievo Bonomi
- Bonomi BS.17 Allievo Cantù
- Bonomi BS.18 Airone
- Bonomi BS.20 Albanella
- Bonomi BS.24 Biposto Roma
- Bonomi BS.28 Alcione
- Bonomi BS.28 Aerodinamico

== Powered aircraft ==
- Bonomi BS.19 Alca
- Bonomi BS.22 Alzavola
