= Bonomi BS.22 Alzavola =

BS.22 Alzavola

General information
- Type: Motor glider
- National origin: Italy
- Manufacturer: Aeronautica Bonomi
- Designer: Camillo Silva
- Number built: 1

History
- First flight: 1934
- Developed from: Bonomi BS.15 Bigiarella

The Bonomi BS.22 Alzavola (English: Teal) was a training motor glider, intended to acquaint capable glider pilots with the characteristics of powered aircraft. The sole example was designed and built in Italy in the mid-1930s.

== Design ==
The BS.22 was evolved from the earlier Bonomi BS.15 Bigiarella glider, though with the addition of a small flat twin engine which drove a pusher propeller. It also had a retractable wheeled conventional undercarriage and a quite different tail. Intended as an inexpensive aircraft, it was Bonomi and Silva's second and last motor glider, the other being the Bonomi BS.19 Alca. The Alzavola was intended to introduce glider pilots with C or B certificates to the complications of powered aircraft. In particular, as well as the retractable conventional undercarriage it had a standard glider landing skid so new pilots could take-off on wheels, retract them and land on the skid in the way they were used to. After becoming familiar with the Alzavola they could put the wheels down before landing.

The wing had a constant chord, unswept central section and straight tapered outer panels with rounded tips. The outer panels' trailing edges were entirely filled with the ailerons. The centre section was supported over the fuselage on a pedestal, which also supported the small flat twin engine slightly above the wing surface, neatly cowled but with its cylinder heads exposed for cooling. Its pusher propeller rotated in a rectangular trailing edge cut-out, at about 70% chord. On each side an asymmetric V-strut, mounted on the lower fuselage longeron immediately below the forward wing spar, supported the outer ends of the centre section, joining its two spars.

The fuselage was flat sided and essentially rectangular, though there was decking to fair in the open cockpit, which had a small windshield, and a dorsal fairing to merge the rear of the pedestal to the tail. Under the cockpit, where the fuselage was deepest, there was a typical glider landing skid. Its conventional undercarriage had two balloon tyre mainwheels, each mounted on V-form split axles attached to the skid and with a shock absorbing strut fixed to the lower longeron. At the rear there was a tailskid. Both tail surfaces were straight tapered and straight cropped. Both rear control surfaces were much larger in area than their fixed counterparts and balanced; the rudder extended to the keel and operated in an elevator cut-out as the tailplane was mounted on the fin just above the fuselage, braced from above and below.

The Alzavola could take off under its own power but could also be launched, with its wheeled undercarriage retracted or removed, by bungee cord, winch or air-tow.

== Specifications ==
Data from Pedrielli (2011) p.103

General characteristics

- Crew: One
- Length: 6.80 m (22 ft 4 in)
- Wingspan: 12.43 m (40 ft 9 in)
- Wing area: 15 m^{2} (160 sq ft)
- Aspect ratio: 10.30
- Empty weight: 180 kg (397 lb)
- Gross weight: 295 kg (650 lb)
- Powerplant: 1 × Unknown type of air cooled flat twin, 13 kW (18 hp) or 19 kW (25 hp)
- Propellers: 2-bladed

Performance

- Maximum speed: 100 km/h (62 mph, 54 kn)
- Stall speed: 50 km/h (31 mph, 27 kn)
- Wing loading: 19 kg/m^{2} (3.9 lb/sq ft)
