= Bottini =

Bottini is an Italian surname. Notable people with the surname include:

- Alberto Bottini (born 1967), Swiss swimmer
- Anna Maria Bottini (1916–2020), Italian actress
- Dante Bottini (born 1979), Argentine tennis coach
- Estefanía Bottini Alemany (born 1974), former professional Spanish tennis player
- Gastone Bottini (born 1987), Italian footballer
- Ivy Bottini (1926–2021), American activist
- Marianna Bottini (1802–1858), Italian classical composer and harp teacher
- Oliver Bottini (born 1965), German crime writer and non-fiction author
- Prospero Bottini (1621–1712), Italian Roman Catholic bishop
- Reg Bottini (1916–1999), British trade union leader
- Silvia Bottini (born 1981), Italian actress and model
