= Aeronatica Lombarda AL-3 =

Italian sailplane

AL-3
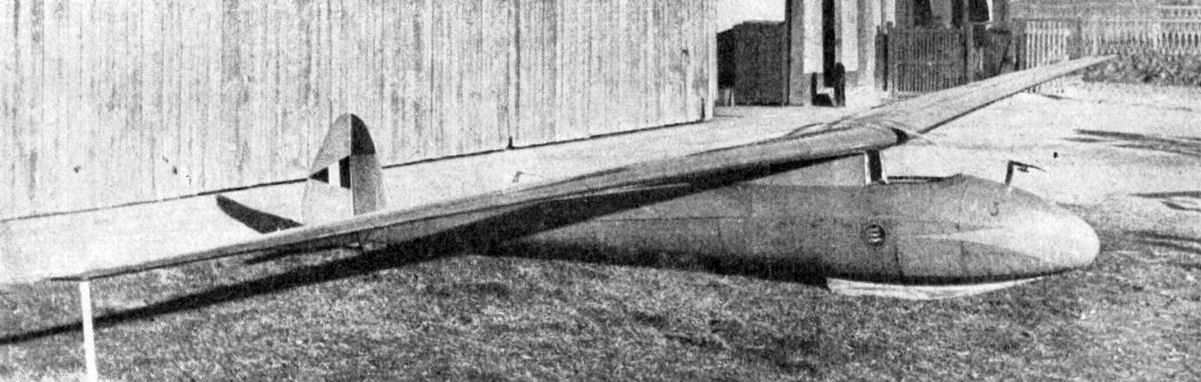

General information
- Type: Competition sailplane
- National origin: Italy
- Manufacturer: Aeronautica Lombarda
- Designer: Camila Silva
- Number built: 1

History
- First flight: 1938

The Aeronautica Lombarda AL-3 was an Italian sailplane, designed and built in 1939 to take part in the Olympic sailplane competition. It did so but was not successful.

== Design and development ==
The AL-3 was one of two Italian designs competing to become the preferred Olympic glider at the 1940 Olympic Games. The other was the CVV-4 Pellicano. Had they happened, these Games would have been the first to host a gliding event. It was planned that all competitors should fly the same 15 m (49 ft 3 in) span type and designs from Germany, France, Italy, the Netherlands and the United Kingdom were evaluated for the role at Sezze, near Rome in Italy during February 1939. The DFS Meise was the competition winner.

The competition stipulated the 15 m (49 ft 3 in) span gliders had to be wooden, though fabric covering could be used. Its cantilever wing was built around a single spar with plywood skinning around the wing forward of it. The wing was attached to a pylon about 230 mm (9 in) above the fuselage and at the centreline the wing ply extended back to about 70% chord, returning to the spar about 1 m (3 ft 3 in) along it. The wing planform was strongly double straight tapered, mostly on the trailing edge where ailerons occupied almost half the span. These were split into two nearly equal sections and acted differentially. Parallel ruler type airbrakes were placed a little inboard of the ailerons, at mid-chord. Near the roots the airfoil section was NACA 4514; further out this was tapered into the symmetric NACA 0012 of the tips, which had 4° of washout to prevent tip stalling.

Apart from a metal nose-cap, the fuselage was plywood skinned throughout. The pilot sat under the wing leading edge, enclosed in continuous glazing which extended on top into a V-shaped cut-out in the wing to enhance upward vision. Behind the cockpit the pylon, which extended just beyond the trailing edge, was also ply covered. From nose to tail the fuselage cross section was ovoid, becoming markedly slimmer aft. The AL-3's tailplane was of similar construction to the wing and likewise strongly tapered. It was positioned largely ahead of a tall, narrow fin, allowing the broad chord, rounded, balanced rudder to extend to the keel without cut-outs in the elevators. The glider landed on a single skid from just aft of the nose to under mid-chord, which was mounted close to the fuselage on rubber shock absorbers.

== Specifications ==
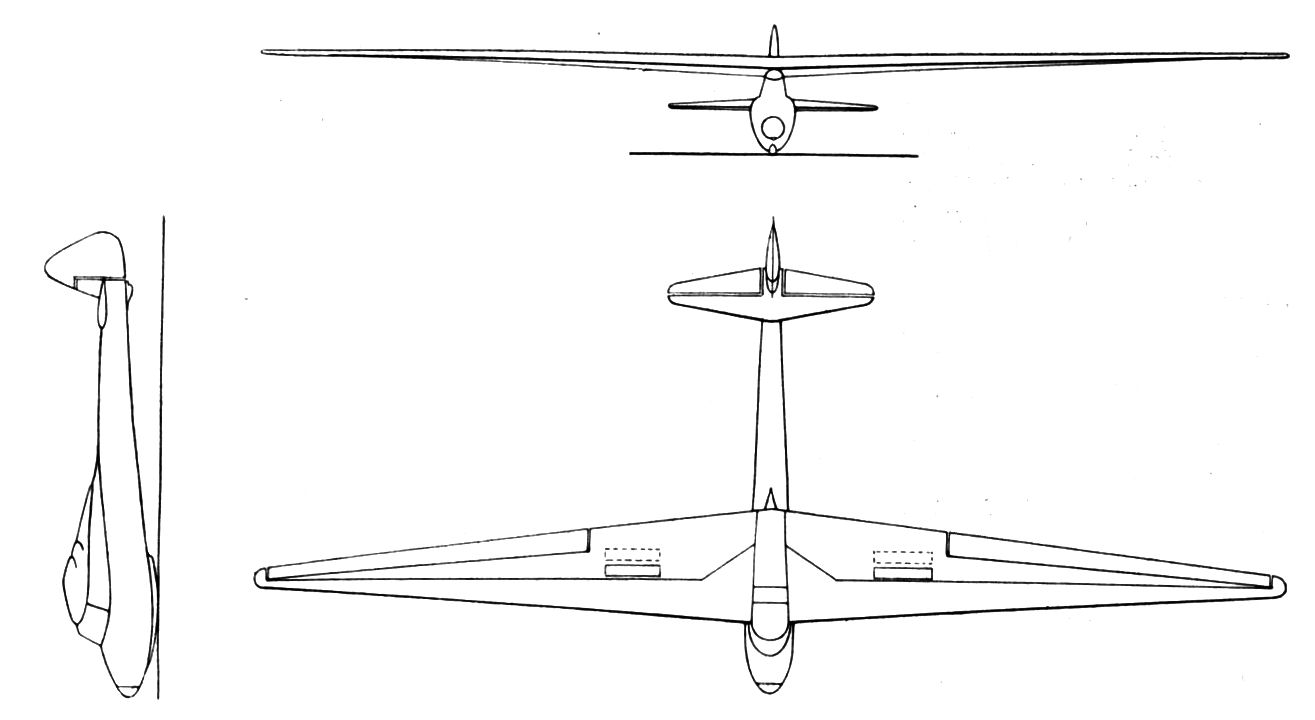
Aeronatica Lombarda AL-3 3-view drawing from L'Aerophile May 1939

Data from Sailplanes 1920-1945

General characteristics

- Crew: One
- Length: 6.60 m (21 ft 8 in)
- Wingspan: 15.00 m (49 ft 3 in)
- Height: 1.17 m (3 ft 10 in) base of fuselage to fin tip, excluding tail skid
- Wing area: 14.00 m^{2} (150.7 sq ft)
- Aspect ratio: 16
- Airfoil: NACA 4514 at root, tapering to NACA 0012 at tips
- Empty weight: 157 kg (346 lb)
- Gross weight: 252 kg (556 lb)

Performance

- Maximum glide ratio: 25:1, estimated
- Wing loading: 18.0 kg/m^{2} (3.7 lb/sq ft)
