= Bonomi BS.15 Bigiarella =

BS.15 Bigiarella

General information
- Type: Single seat glider
- National origin: Italy
- Manufacturer: Aeronautica Bonomi
- Designer: Camillo Silva
- Number built: 3

History
- First flight: 1934

The Bonomi BS.15 Bigiarella (Italian for 'lesser whitethroat'), originally named the Bonomi BS.6 Bigiarella was a single seat glider, designed and built in Italy in 1934. Only three were constructed.

== Design and development ==
The Bigiarella was a single seat high wing braced monoplane, constructed from wood and fabric. Its fuselage, though conventional, was a new design but otherwise the Bigiarella was very similar to the BS.8 Biancone, using the same wings and support structure. The Biancone, though it had a nacelle housing the cockpit had retained the fuselage boom of its predecessor, the BS.7 Allievo Italia. In contrast, the Bigiarella had a full, rectangular cross section fuselage which was only slightly tapered, the deepest section containing the pilot's open, unscreened cockpit in front of and below the wing's high leading edge. The fuselage was largely fabric covered but the central part containing the wing support structure was plywood skinned. In some photographs the three sloping struts that connected wing and fuselage, a distorted N arrangement most easily visible on the BS.7, were faired in as on the Biancone, but others show them exposed. The new fuselage, deeper at the tail than the Biancone's tailboom, required a less tall fin to maintain the tailplane's position with respect to the rudder but otherwise the empennage was unchanged. A wooden landing skid with rubber springing, deep like the one on the BS.11 Milano and assisted by a small tail bumper served as its undercarriage.

Only three Bigiarellas were built.

== Operational history ==
In July 1934 a Bigiarella set an endurance record of 2 hrs 50 min, flying at Vigne di Valle near Rome.

== Specifications ==
Data from Pedrielli (2011) p.93

General characteristics

- Crew: One
- Length: 6.82 m (22 ft 5 in)
- Wingspan: 13.40 m (44 ft 0 in)
- Wing area: 14.50 m^{2} (156.1 sq ft)
- Aspect ratio: 12.40
- Empty weight: 115 kg (254 lb)
- Gross weight: 190 kg (419 lb)

Performance

- Maximum glide ratio: 14:1 estimated
- Rate of sink: 0.74 m/s (146 ft/min)
- Wing loading: 13.10 kg/m^{2} (2.68 lb/sq ft)
