= Berte =

Berte is a name of Old German origin. Notable persons with that name include:

== Given name ==
- Berte Canutte Aarflot (1795–1859), Norwegian Christian hymnwriter
- Berte Rognerud (1907–1997), Norwegian politician
- Berte Skeel (1644–1720), Danish noble, philanthropist and estate owner

== Surname ==
- Domenica Bertè (1947–1995), birthname of Italian singer Mia Martini
- Harry Berte (1872–1952), American baseball player
- Heinrich Berté (born Heinrich Bettelheim), Austria-Hungarian opera and operetta composer
- Loredana Bertè (born 1950), Italian singer-songwriter
- Mohamed Berte (born 2002), Belgian footballer

== See also ==
- Berth (disambiguation)
- Berti, a given name and surname
- Bertie (disambiguation)
