= Czerwiński and Jaworski ITS-II =

ITS-II

General information
- Type: Intermediate training glider
- National origin: Poland
- Designer: Wacław Czerwiński and Władysław Jaworski
- Number built: c.6

History
- First flight: November 1932

The ITS-II was a Polish intermediate training glider. Only about five were built as it was soon outclassed by newer Polish aircraft but some were used until 1935. ITS-IIs were used in early training courses on air towing and another gave the first demonstration of glider aerobatics in Poland. It was also used to set one national record.

== Design and development ==
ZASPL, the Aviation Association of students of the Lwów Technical University, was the oldest aviation organization in Poland. Revived after World War I, by 1926 it had workshops in Lwów which began building the glider designs of ZASPL member Wacław Czerwiński. His seventh aircraft, the second designed in collaboration with Władysław Jaworski, was originally named the CWJ 2 but, in recognition of an Institute of Gliding Technique (I.T.S.) specification for an intermediate type training glider, was renamed ITS-II.

The ITS-II had a two-part wing with a rectangular plan out to extended semi-elliptical tips. It was built around twin spars and covered with plywood ahead of the forward spar and with fabric behind. Broad-chord ailerons occupied about half the span. The wing was mounted centrally on a faired cabane and braced with a pair of V-struts from the spars to the lower fuselage.

Its fuselage was ply-covered and hexagonal in cross section over much of its length but as it narrowed rearwards the vertical sides tapered away, leaving the cross section diamond shaped. The bottom was a box structure which mounted an ash landing skid. There was an open cockpit immediately ahead of the cabane. The glider's empennage was conventional, with a small fin carrying a broad, deep, curved, balanced rudder. Its triangular plan tailplane was mounted on the base of the fin and carried round-tipped but otherwise rectangular elevators that had a cut-out for rudder movement.

The first flight of the ITS-II was made in November 1932 with an air tow at Lwów-Skniłów airfield. Handling was satisfactory and according to Cynk a small run of the ITS-IIa production version, which had a modified rear fuselage cross-section, began. About five were built. Samolotypolskie.pl's account is a little different, saying that in 1932 a few more like the prototype were completed and known as the ITS-IIa/32. These were then rebuilt as ITS-IIa/33s with reinforced rear fuselages. Both estimate that about five production ITS-IIs were completed.

== Operational history ==
It soon became apparent that the ITS-II was out-performed by the 1933 Kocjan Komar glider and production ceased. The existing aircraft were used productively in 1933. The prototype took part in the first Polish training course on tow-launching, held at Warsaw-Mokotów in February and two were at the next such event at Lwów in July. On 22 April Maria Younga, based at Bezmiechowa, set a new Polish women's duration record of 110 minutes. At a meeting in Lwów in the autumn of 1933 Michał Blaicher gave the first exhibition of glider aerobatics seen in Poland. Gliding clubs at both at Lwów and Bezmiechowa used them, the former until 1935.

== Variants ==
ITS-II
Prototype
ITS-IIa
Production version, with modified rear fuselage. About five built.

== Specifications ==
Data from General, J. Cynk, 1971, Performance Samolot

General characteristics

- Crew: One
- Length: 6.35 m (20 ft 10 in)
- Wingspan: 12 m (39 ft 4 in)
- Wing area: 14.4 m^{2} (155 sq ft)
- Aspect ratio: 10
- Airfoil: Warsaw Aerodynamic Institute No.192
- Empty weight: 105 kg (231 lb)
- Gross weight: 180 kg (397 lb)

Performance

- Stall speed: 44 km/h (27 mph, 24 kn) minimum speed
- Maximum glide ratio: 16.5 best at 53 km/h (33 mph; 29 kn)
- Rate of sink: 0.88 m/s (173 ft/min) minimum at 49 km/h (30 mph; 26 kn)
