= BS10 (TV channel) =

Japanese television channel

- Type: Satellite television network
- Country: Japan
- Affiliates: BS10 Premium (premium sister channel)
- Headquarters: Shinkawa, Chūō, Tokyo

Programming
- Language: Japanese
- Picture format: HDTV 1080i

Ownership
- Owner: Japanet Broadcasting Co., Ltd.

History
- Launched: 27 March 2022; 4 years ago
- Former names: BS Japanext (2022-2025)

Links
- Website: www.bs10.jp (in Japanese)

BS10 is a Japanese satellite television channel owned by Japanet Broadcasting, a subsidiary of Japanet Takata.

== History ==
On May 20, 2019, Japanet solicited a license to the Ministry of Internal Affairs and Communications for a free-to-view satellite channel, tentatively named BS Japanet Next. The ministry approved the license request on September 9.

Japanet Takata had previously owned a cable and satellite shopping channel, Japanet Channel DX, from March 24, 2001 to March 31, 2021. The company closed the channel in order to concentrate on a new channel, which, instead of airing its usual type of programming, would take on a broader line-up, encompassing genres such as anime and drama. Test transmissions started at 5am on March 9, 2022, using the name BS Japanext, on channel 263, and began broadcasting on March 27. In tandem with its launch, the channel launched a smartphone app featuring the channel's stream (some programs being blocked due to copyright restrictions). To counter viewing problems caused by its satellite frequency being lower than other channels, the channel's app expanded its reach to include smart TVs on May 1, 2023.

On May 26, 2023, BS Japanext entered the M-League professional Japanese mahjong league by forming the BEAST Japanext team, which began competing in the fall. The team was renamed BEAST X (X pronounced as "ten") the following season, following the station's renaming to BS10.

The Tsunugari Japanext app was discontinued at the beginning of fiscal 2025, moving its on-demand presence to the TVer platform.

On June 1, 2024, Japanet Broadcasting acquired Star Channel from Tohokushinsha. As consequence, Star Channel 1 became a sister channel to BS Japanext, while, with the discontinuation of Star Channel 2 and Star Channel 3, the company now owned two satellite channels.

On August 22, it was announced that BS Japanext would be renamed BS10. On October 29, it was announced that the rebrand would take place on January 10, 2025. The channel aired a special broadcast on January 9 to mark the move. After that, the station moved from channel 263 to 200 (200 being inherited from Star Channel, which moved to 201 as a scrambled subchannel) and its former frequency was vacated.

In line with the restructuring, the channel was made available on cable television companies such as J:COM, which did not carry the channel when it was BSJapanext. In addition, Video Research began measuring the channel's ratings as part of its satellite rankings.
