= Bonomi BS.11 Milano =

BS.11 Milano

General information
- Type: Primary Primary glider
- National origin: Italy
- Manufacturer: Aeronautica Bonomi
- Designer: Camillo Silva
- Number built: c.6, including BS.12 Romas

History
- First flight: 1933

The Bonomi BS.11 Milano and BS.12 Roma were primary gliders designed and built in Italy in the 1930s. Only about six were produced.

== Design and development ==
Plans of the influential German primary glider Zögling of 1926 were sold worldwide and led to many similar new designs. One of its features was a very simple rectangular wing plan; in Italy, Camillo Silva used something similar in at least seven of his designs, the Allievo A and B (1928?) and the Bonomi series BS.7 Allievo Italia (1929), BS.16 Allievo Bonomi (1930), BS.11 Milano, BS.12 Roma (1933) and BS.17 Allievo Cantù (1934). Amongst these, the A and B and the BS.11 and 12 had wire, rather than strut braced wings. These two pairs differed primarily in the pilot's accommodation; the early two had exposed seats and the later gliders open cockpits in full fuselages, though both the rear fuselages and empennages also differed greatly.

Like all these designs, the BS.11 was a simple, high wing aircraft. Its rectangular plan, two spar, fabric covered wings were supported over the nacelle on a single, central, distorted N form strut, with an upright forward member and a sloping rear component. These met the wing at the spars, the forward one almost at the leading edge. The rear member of the N extended above the wing to meet a short, near vertical strut, forming a flat, fabric covered, triangular pylon or cabane, from which a pair of landing wires ran to both spars on each side. Flying wires from a point on the lower fuselage directly beneath the tip of the cabane ran to the same positions on the wing underside. As on all of these low aspect ratio Zögling style wings, the ailerons were short span and broad, with cropped tips forming the wing tips

The Milano had a rectangular section, plywood skinned fuselage, with an open, unscreened cockpit below the wing leading edge. A wooden landing skid, with deep rubber springing, ran aft from near the nose to the end of the N-frame, assisted by a small tail bumper. The empennage was similar to those of the BS.7 and BS.8, with a strut braced triangular tailplane on a short, broad fin, the latter carrying a constant chord, unbalanced rudder about three times the height of the fin. The elevators were also unbalanced and of constant chord apart from a cut-out for rudder movement.

The BS.12 Roma was similar to the Milano but a little greater in span.

The first flight of the Milano was in 1932. About six Milanos and Romas were built. Designed to be winch launched, they were seen as a suitable aircraft on which to gain a B certificate for a 30-minute flight.

== Variants ==
BS.11 Milano
as described.

BS.12 Roma
Similar but slightly greater span of 20.00 m (65 ft 7 in).

== Specifications (BS.11 Milano) ==
Data from Pedrielli (2011) p.89

General characteristics

- Crew: One
- Length: 6.06 m (19 ft 11 in)
- Wingspan: 10.92 m (35 ft 10 in)
- Wing area: 17.50 m^{2} (188.4 sq ft)
- Aspect ratio: 6.8
- Empty weight: 115 kg (254 lb)
- Gross weight: 190 kg (419 lb)

Performance

- Maximum glide ratio: 12:1 estimated
- Wing loading: 11 kg/m^{2} (2.3 lb/sq ft)
