= Bonomi BS.28 Alcione =

BS.28 Alcione

General information
- Type: Competition sailplane
- National origin: Italy
- Manufacturer: Aeronautica Bonomi
- Designer: Camillo Silva
- Number built: c.4

History
- First flight: c.1938

The Bonomi BS.28 Alcione (English: Halcyon or Kingfisher), sometimes known as the Lombarda BS.28 Alcione, was a single seat competition sailplane designed and built in Italy in 1937-8. About four were completed, with two more or less refined fuselages.

== Design and development ==
The Alcione was the last of many gliders designed by Camillo Silva at Aeronautica Benomi, as the latter was taken over in 1937 by Aeronautica Lombarda. The change of ownership led to the Alcione being referred to as both a Bonomi and a Lombarda. Silva designed at least one further glider for Lombarda, the AL-3 which was one of two Italian competitors in the 1939 Olympic Sailplane Competition of 1939.

The Alcione was a refined sailplane in its day, designed in collaboration with the Polytechnic University of Milan. It was a cantilever mid-wing monoplane, its wing built around a single spar at about one third chord. Forward of the spar the wing was plywood covered, forming a torque resisting D-box; elsewhere it was fabric covered. In plan the wings were straight tapered to rounded tips. The whole trailing edge of each wing was moveable, the inner third acting as camber changing air brakes and the rest as differential ailerons. Spoilers of the early, single action Centro Volo a Vela (CVV) type were mounted on the upper wing surface immediately behind the spar and at about one quarter span.

Two different fuselages were built for the Alciones. Both had the same general form, deep under the cockpit which was placed forward of the wing leading edge under an enclosing canopy. There was a short landing skid, ending aft at a semi-recessed wheel at about mid chord. However, one fuselage type had a hexagonal cross-section and the other was better shaped aerodynamically as an ovoid. The latter was lower along the dorsal line, so the other's glazed cockpit cover was lengthened aft with a ply covered extension including small side windows. The lower line also required the addition of a very short pedestal for the tailplane, directly mounted onto the hexagonal fuselage. The horizontal tail was straight tapered and round tipped, placed with its trailing edge in line with that of a narrow fin so that no cut-out for rudder movement was needed. On the ovoid fuselage version with its small pedestal the fin reached only about halfway to the top of the rudder, allowing the inclusion of an aerodynamic balance. On the other fuselage the fin continued upwards to the rudder tip. The rudder itself was broad and D-shaped. There was a little tail bumper on the fuselage keel at the rudder's foot.

The ovoid fuselage version became known as the B.28 Aerodinamico.

The Alcione dates from either 1937 or 1938, with registration dates supporting the latter. Images identify three examples and the register a fourth.

== Operational history ==
An Alcione took part in the Asiago Gliding Competition of 1938.

== Specifications ==
Data from Pedrielli (2011) p.107

General characteristics

- Crew: One
- Length: 6.55 m (21 ft 6 in)
- Wingspan: 14.50 m (47 ft 7 in)
- Wing area: 14 m^{2} (150 sq ft)
- Aspect ratio: 15
- Empty weight: 160 kg (353 lb)
- Gross weight: 254 kg (560 lb)

Performance

- Maximum glide ratio: 22:1 estimated
- Rate of sink: 0.75 m/s (148 ft/min)
- Wing loading: 17.50 kg/m^{2} (3.58 lb/sq ft)
