= Stralpes Aéro ST-11 =

French single-seat glider, 1982

ST-11

General information
- Type: Single-seat club-class sailplane
- National origin: France
- Manufacturer: Stralpes Aéro SARL
- Designer: Christian Brondel

History
- First flight: 29 August 1982

The Stralpes Aéro ST-11 is a French single-seat club-class sailplane designed by Christian Brondel and built by Stralpes Aéro of Challes-les-Eaux.

== Design and development ==
The ST-11 is a cantilever mid-wing monoplane with a cruciform tail and the prototype first flew on 29 August 1982. The landing gear is a fixed semi-recessed monowheel gear and a tailskid, the enclosed single-seat cockpit has a one-piece canopy.

=== ST-11M Minimus ===
A powered motor-glider version.

== Specifications ==
Data from Jane's All the World's Aircraft 1989-90

General characteristics

- Crew: 1
- Length: 5.55 m (18 ft 2.5 in)
- Wingspan: 11.60 m (38 ft 0.25 in)
- Height: 1.135 m (3 ft 8.75 in)
- Wing area: 6.54 m^{2} (70.4 sq ft)
- Aspect ratio: 20.6
- Empty weight: 110 kg (243 lb)
- Gross weight: 230 kg (507 lb)

Performance

- Maximum speed: 230 km/h (143 mph, 124 kn)
- Stall speed: 68 km/h (42 mph, 36 kn)
- g limits: +5.3/-2.65
- Maximum glide ratio: 35
- Rate of sink: 0.65 m/s (128 ft/min)

== See also ==
Related lists

- List of gliders
