= Francesco Bertelli =

Italian astronomer

- Born: 1794
- Died: 1844 (aged 49–50)
- Education: University of Bologna
- Scientific career
- Fields: Astronomy
- Workplaces: University of Bologna, observatory of Bologna

Francesco Bertelli (1794–1844) was an Italian astronomer at the observatory of Bologna and professor of astronomy at the University of Bologna. The main-belt asteroid 8266 Bertelli is named after him.
