= Cristofano Bertelli =

Italian engraver

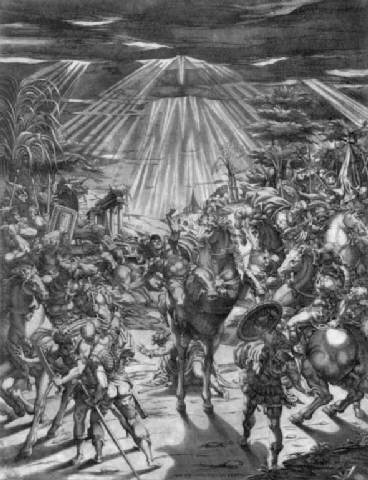
Conversion of Saint Paul by Cristofano Bertelli

Cristofano Bertelli (active c. 1525) was an Italian engraver. He was born in Rimini in the Duchy of Modena. A few of his plates survive: Portrait of Ottavio Farnese, Duke of Parma; Conversion of St. Paul; Holy Family with Saints Augustine, Sebastian, & Helena, with St. Joseph sleeping. Virgin and Child with St. George and other Saints; Virgin and Child, with Saints Sebastian, Francis, and Roch after Correggio; and The different Ages of Man.
