= Bowlus CG-7 =

CG-7

General information
- Type: Transport glider
- National origin: United States
- Manufacturer: Bowlus Sailplanes
- Number built: 1

History
- First flight: 1942

The Bowlus CG-7 was a prototype Second World War American transport glider to be built for United States Army, one was built but the type did not enter production and the programme was cancelled.

== Design and development ==
The Army awarded a contract to Bowlus Sailplanes for an eight-seat and 15-seat transport glider, the smaller glider was designated the XCG-7 and the larger the XCG-8. The XCG-7 was delivered to Wright Field for testing in February 1942 where it failed structural testing, the glider was repaired but failed again. The glider was not ordered into production and the wood and fabric glider was used to test ways of protecting aircraft against lightning at the High Voltage Laboratory of the National Bureau of Standards.

== Variants ==
XCG-7
Prototype eight-seat transport glider, one built.

== Specifications (XCG-7) ==
Data from Mrazek

General characteristics

- Crew: 2 (pilot, co-pilot)
- Capacity: 7 fully equipped troops
- Length: 36 ft 0 in (10.97 m)
- Wingspan: 80 ft 0 in (24.38 m)
- Wing area: 600 sq ft (56 m^{2})
- Empty weight: 5,000 lb (2,268 kg)
- Max takeoff weight: 7,000 lb (3,175 kg)

Performance

- Cruise speed: 120 mph (190 km/h, 100 kn) while being towed

== See also ==
- Military gliders

Related development

- Bowlus CG-8
