= Bonomi BS.9 Bertina =

BS.9 Bertina II

General information
- Type: Experimental glider
- National origin: Italy
- Manufacturer: Aeronautica Bonomi
- Designer: Camillo Silva

History
- First flight: 1933
- Developed from: Bonomi BS.7 Allievo Italia

The Bonomi BS.9 Bertina II was a single seat glider with a layout somewhere between that of a flying wing and the conventional, tail stabilized arrangement. A single example was designed and built in Italy in the 1930s.

== Design and development ==
The BS.9 Bertina II (there seems to be no record of the Bertina I) was an unusual glider, being neither conventionally proportioned nor a flying wing but rather a mixture of both. It was a cantilever monoplane with a very thick wing of low aspect ratio and a cropped triangular plan. The leading edge sweep was about 27° outboard of a short constant chord centre section and there was pronounced dihedral on the wing underside. Long span ailerons occupied almost all the span. A short, simple, cruciform cross-section beam ran back to the empennage, appearing in elevation like a fine boom but from above seen to begin with almost the width of the wing centre section, narrowing rearwards. The tail surfaces were conventional and followed the design of some earlier Bonomi types; the vertical tail was straight tapered and straight angle tipped, with a small fin and large, balanced rudder which extended down to the keel. There was only enough fixed horizontal surface, mounted at the vertical centre of the tail beam, to act as a mounting for the balanced elevators which were shaped similarly to the rudder, though shorter and with a cut-out for rudder movement.

A diagram shows a version of the Bertina II with a fuselage extending conventionally ahead of the wing, though always beneath it. It had a standard single skid undercarriage, with wing tip and tail bumpers. A second form, seen the diagram and also in all the photographs has the glider with a shortened fuselage ending under the wing at around the one third chord point, reducing the overall length to about 3.70 metres (12 feet 2 inches). This version also had vulnerable, lozenge shaped, fixed end plate fins on its tips, extending both above and below the wing, and a double skid undercarriage, forming a sledge-like arrangement held well away from the fuselage and suitable for snow. In both forms the pilot sat in an almost rectangular small, open, unscreened cut-out cockpit in the wing near mid-chord.

The BS.9 flew for the first time in 1933, having been first registered in May that year. Being small, very light, easy to rig in the absence of flying wires and ski-equipped, the Bertina II was very suitable for gliding in mountainous regions from snowy, hard to access fields. Many such flights were reported by Italian aircraft magazines.

== Specifications (long fuselage) ==
Data from Pedrielli (2011) p.85

General characteristics

- Crew: One
- Length: 4.25 m (13 ft 11 in)
- Wingspan: 9.28 m (30 ft 5 in)
- Wing area: 12.80 m^{2} (137.8 sq ft)
- Aspect ratio: 6.70
- Empty weight: 50 kg (110 lb)
- Gross weight: 120 kg (265 lb)

Performance

- Maximum glide ratio: 12:1 estimated
- Wing loading: 9.55 kg/m^{2} (1.96 lb/sq ft)
