= Marianna Bottini =

Italian composer

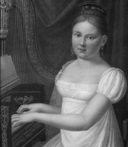
Marianna Bottini

Marianna Bottini née Motroni-Andreozzi (7 November 1802 – 25 January 1858) was an Italian composer and harp teacher. A contemporary of Rossini, Bottini was of the most prominent voices in Italian classical music in the 19th century. She was born, lived, and died in Lucca. She was the daughter of a noble family, born to parents Sebastiano Motroni-Andreozzi and Eleonora Flekestein.

Bottini studied counterpoint with Domenico Quilici and was admitted to the Accademia Filarmonica in Bologna in 1820 as an 'honorary master composer'. The majority of her compositional output dates from 1815-1822 (between the ages of 13-20). She subsequently stopped composing at the age of 22 in 1824, after she married the Marquis Lorenzo Bottini, a prominent political figure.

== Life and work ==
Bottini is well known for at least one clarinet concerto, written for a clarino. Her surviving manuscripts, including her clarinet concerto, are preserved at the Istituto Musicale Luigi Boccherini in Lucca (in the Bottini collection). This includes several chamber works for various instruments, including a quadrino for two violins, clarino, and bass. Reproductions of scores and parts may be made available upon request.

She was one of the few women whose music was played for the traditional festival in honor of St. Cecilia.

Bottini's opera Elena e Gerardo (1822) received its world premiere in 2023 by Random Opera Company.

=== Fondo Bottini ===
Bottini's mother-in-law Teresa was an accomplished singer and harpist & a part of the court of the Grand Duchess of Tuscany. After her marriage, Marianna worked with her mother-in-law to preserve scores and manuscripts, creating an expansive collection of 248 volumes divided into 1,200 musical editions. In total, their collection contained about 2,300 compositions. This intact collection, titled Fondo Bottini (Bottini Collection), is divided into three parts: Teresa's library, Marianna's library, and Marianna's music. It can be found at the Istituto Musicale Luigi Boccherini (Luigi Boccherini Music Institute) in Lucca alongside collections from Bonaccorsi and Puccini. It was donated to the institute by Marquis Antonio Bottini in 1930.

Marianna's scores are sorted in 15 volumes and show signs of handling, which suggests her compositions were being performed.

== Selected works ==
Bottini composed most of her works between the ages of 13 and 20, including music for salons and sacred works. Selected compositions include:

- Motet for one voice, orchestra, 1818
- Qui Tollis for one voice, chorus, orchestra, 1818
- Symphonie for orchestra, 1818
- Symphonie for wind band, 1819
- Messa da Requiem for 4 voices, orchestra, 1819
- Motet for one voice, orchestra, 1819
- Quoniam for Bass and orchestra, 1819
- Qui Tollis for Bass and orchestra, 1819
- Stabat Mater for 3 voices, 1819
- Te Deum for 3 voices, 1819
- In sacred hymns for three voices, wind instruments, basso continuo, 1819
- Briseis (C. Moscheni) cantata for 3 voices, chorus, orchestra, 1820
- Stabat Mater for 3 voices, 1820
- Elena and Gerardo, unperformed* opera, 1822
- Mass for Saint Cecilia for 4 voices, orchestra, 1822
- Motet for Saint Cecilia for one voice, orchestra, 1822
- Piano concerto "Concertone", 1822
- Mag for 4 voices, orchestra, after 1823
- Miserere for 3 voices, basso continuo, 1824

Works with unknown composition date:

- Cantiamo Pastori cantata for 5 voices, orchestra
- Crucifixus for 2 voices, continuo
- Dixit Dominus for 5 voices, orchestra
- Domino ad adjuvandum for 4 voices, orchestra
- Clarinet concerto
- Quartet for harp, piano, clarinet and horn
