= Bonomi BS.17 Allievo Cantù =

BS.17 Allievo Cantù
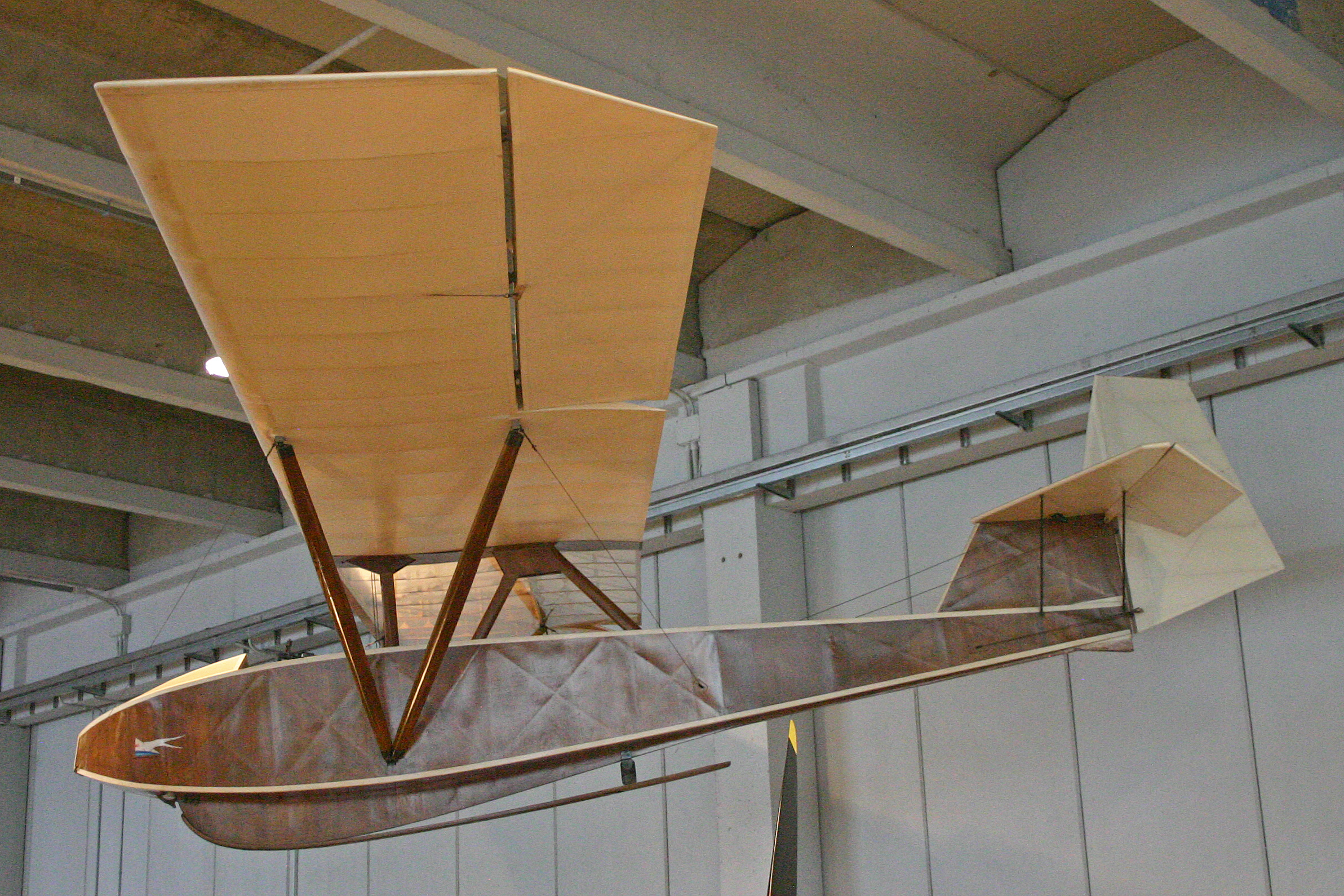
- Allievo Cantù at the Italian Air Force Museum on the former Vigna di Valle Air Base in Bracciano

General information
- Type: training glider
- National origin: Italy
- Manufacturer: Aeronautica Bonomi
- Designer: Camillo Silva
- Number built: more than 100

History
- First flight: 1934

The Bonomi BS.17 Allievo Cantù (English: Cantù student) was a single seat training glider, designed and built in Italy in 1934 and widely used by flying clubs.

== Design and development ==
The BS.17 was intended to complement the earlier and successful BS.16 primary glider by providing the enhanced performance required to take new pilots to qualifications beyond the A certificate. It used the wings and central support structure of the BS.16 and shared many smaller parts and fittings, but had a new, conventional fuselage in place of the primary's platform, together with different wing struts and empennage.

The BS.17's wings were, like those of the BS.16, rectangular in plan apart from clipped aileron tips. Mounted without dihedral, the two separate wings were built around a pair of spars, one close to the leading edge with plywood covering forward from it around the edge forming a torsion-resistant D-box. Behind it the wing was fabric covered. Centrally, the wings were supported over the fuselage on the same cross braced trapezoidal structure used originally on the BS.16 and later on several other Bonomi gliders. The wings were braced with an asymmetric, faired wooden V strut on each side, attached to the lower fuselage and running to the wing spars at about mid-span.

Its fuselage was a simple rectangular cross section wooden structure skinned with plywood. The single seat, open, unscreened cockpit was immediately below the leading edge. The landing skid was mounted on the front end of a curved, deep, covered frame on the fuselage underside, separating from it aft and rubber sprung well clear towards its end. The fuselage tapered rearwards, where there was a small tail bumper. The tail was different from that of the BS.16; although the same triangular tailplane and parallel chord, cropped tipped elevators were used, they were mounted on top of a low, straight edged fin. A new, large, balanced, angular rudder, hinged at the extreme tail extended down to the keel, operated in a cut-out between the elevators.

== Operational history ==
The Allievo Cantù was well received by Italian gliding clubs, who used it to take novice pilots to their B certificate and gain experience above that level. More than one hundred were sold.

== Specifications ==
Data from Pedrielli (2011) p.73

General characteristics

- Crew: One
- Length: 6.37 m (20 ft 11 in)
- Wingspan: 10.50 m (34 ft 5 in)
- Wing area: 17.80 m^{2} (191.6 sq ft)
- Aspect ratio: 6.20
- Empty weight: 125 kg (276 lb)
- Gross weight: 205 kg (452 lb)

Performance

- Maximum glide ratio: 16:1 estimated
- Wing loading: 11.20 kg/m^{2} (2.29 lb/sq ft)
