= Bowlus CG-8 =

CG-8

General information
- Type: Transport glider
- National origin: United States
- Manufacturer: Bowlus Sailplanes
- Number built: 1

History
- First flight: 1942

The Bowlus CG-8 was a prototype Second World War American transport glider to be built for United States Army, one was built, but the type did not enter production and the programme was cancelled.

== Design and development ==
The Army awarded a contract to Bowlus Sailplanes for an eight-seat and 15-seat transport glider, the smaller glider was designated the XCG-7 and the larger the XCG-8. The company encountered serious problems with the design of the larger XCG-8 and the company asked for assistance from the Douglas Aircraft Company, to no avail as the XCG-8 failed testing and did not enter production. The glider was made from wood and fabric, it was destroyed in a storm in June 1943.

== Variants ==
XCG-8
Prototype 15-seat transport glider, one built.

== Specifications (XCG-8) ==
Data from Mrazek

General characteristics

- Crew: 2 (pilot, co-pilot)
- Capacity: 7 fully equipped troops
- Length: 45 ft 0 in (13.72 m)
- Wingspan: 90 ft 0 in (27.43 m)
- Wing area: 880 sq ft (82 m^{2})
- Empty weight: 7,450 lb (3,379 kg)
- Max takeoff weight: 11,050 lb (5,012 kg)

Performance

- Cruise speed: 120 mph (190 km/h, 100 kn) while being towed

== See also ==
- Military gliders

Related development

- Bowlus CG-7
