= Bonomi BS.19 Alca =

WW2 aircraft

BS.19 Alca

General information
- Type: Motor glider
- National origin: Italy
- Manufacturer: Aeronautica Bonomi
- Designer: Camillo Silva
- Number built: 1

History
- First flight: 1936

The Bonomi BS.19 Alca (English: Auk) was a single seat, tractor configuration motor glider, designed and built in Italy shortly before World War II. It had an unusual retractable undercarriage used only for take-offs. Only one was built.

== Design and development ==
In the mid-1930s some glider designers were beginning to think about incorporating an engine, to form a self-launching aircraft. One of the first of these, the Carden-Baynes Auxiliary flew in 1935. It was very clearly primarily a glider, particularly when its engine and propeller were folded away into the fuselage, an operation possible in flight. The BS.19 Alca of 1936 was closer to a high aspect ratio light aircraft, with no provision of a foldaway propeller. It was the first powered aircraft designed by Camillo Silva for Aeronautica Bonomi. The Alca, a single seater, was powered by a small flat twin engine of unknown make but producing between 15 kW (20 hp) and 19 kW (25 hp).

The Alca's cantilever mid-mounted monoplane wing was built in three parts around a box front spar and a second rear spar. There was a short centre section, only about 10% of the span and integrated into the fuselage, plus two outer panels. The wing plan was strongly straight tapered, largely on the trailing edge, ending in elliptical tips; there was also strong taper in thickness. Covering was a mixture of plywood and fabric. Long ailerons occupied more than half the span.

The Alca's flat sided fuselage was deep from the nose to behind the wing trailing edge where the underside swept upwards, producing an almost boom like rear fuselage. The pilot's open cockpit, fitted with a small windscreen, was placed just ahead of mid chord between the spars. The upper fuselage line was almost flat and the little twin cylinder engine was high in the nose with its cylinder heads exposed for cooling. At the rear the empennage was conventional, though in glider fashion the straight edged fixed surfaces were small in area compared with the control surfaces. A tailplane braced from both above and below was mounted on the fin just above the fuselage; together with its balanced elevator it had a tapered, round tipped plan, with a cut-out for movement of the straight edged, though rounded, balanced rudder which extended to the keel. The Alca had a conventional glider type, rubber sprung landing skid plus tail bumper but it also had an unusual wheeled undercarriage for take-off. This featured a wheel on each side mounted on a half axle attached to the lower fuselage longeron and a vertical shock absorbing leg to the wing. After take-off, this was retracted and not used again until the next departure.

Data on the Alca's performance under power have survived, but not on its gliding characteristics beyond a comment that they were excellent, as was the handling. Only the prototype was built.

== Specifications ==
Data from Pedrielli (2011) p.99

General characteristics

- Crew: One
- Length: 6.90 m (22 ft 8 in)
- Wingspan: 14.50 m (47 ft 7 in)
- Wing area: 17.80 m^{2} (191.6 sq ft)
- Aspect ratio: 12
- Empty weight: 200 kg (441 lb)
- Gross weight: 280 kg (617 lb)
- Powerplant: 1 × Unknown type of air cooled flat twin, 15 kW (20 hp) or 19 kW (25 hp)
- Propellers: 2-bladed

Performance

- Maximum speed: 120 km/h (75 mph, 65 kn)
- Stall speed: 48 km/h (30 mph, 26 kn)
- Wing loading: 17.80 kg/m^{2} (3.65 lb/sq ft)
