= Bonomi BS.14 Astore =

BS.14 Astorte

General information
- Type: Trainer glider
- National origin: Italy
- Manufacturer: Aeronautica Bonomi
- Designer: Camillo Silva
- Number built: 1

History
- First flight: 1935

The Bonomi BS.14 Astore (English: Goshawk) was a two-seat training and aerobatic glider, designed and built in Italy in 1935. Only one was constructed.

== Design and development ==
The Camillo Silva designed Astore first flew in 1935. It was a tandem two seat sailplane intended for training, with the student in the rear, underwing position. This seat could also hold a passenger for pleasure flights at flying events. In addition the Astore was stressed for aerobatics. It was a high braced wing monoplane, with a wing built around two spars and constructed in two parts. Each part had a constant chord central section, and was straight tapered outboard, ending with rounded tips. Ailerons occupied all the trailing edge of the tapered section. The two parts met at and were supported by a low fuselage pedestal; they were braced on each side by a distorted, faired, steel V-strut, with its base mounted on the lower fuselage directly below the forward spar and its two upper ends attached to each of the spars at the outer end of the centre section.

The Astore had a hexagonal cross section, plywood skinned fuselage. The pilot's open, unscreened cockpit was in front of the wing leading edge. The student or passenger sat at the centre of gravity under the wing in a cockpit that formed part of the central pedestal, with side and roof windows. A wooden landing skid with rubber springing, assisted by a small tail bumper served as its undercarriage. The empennage was similar to that of the BS.5 Ballerina, its surfaces straight tapered and square tipped. The balanced rudder was much larger in area than the fin and the horizontal tail was similarly proportioned with only enough tailplane to support the balanced elevators. it was braced just above the fuselage, with large cut outs to allow movement of the lower rudder.

Only one Astore was built.

== Specifications ==
Data from Pedrielli (2011) p.91

General characteristics

- Crew: Two
- Length: 7.53 m (24 ft 8 in)
- Wingspan: 17.60 m (57 ft 9 in)
- Wing area: 25.20 m^{2} (271.3 sq ft)
- Aspect ratio: 12.30
- Empty weight: 200 kg (441 lb)
- Gross weight: 363 kg (800 lb)

Performance

- Maximum glide ratio: 22:1 estimated
- Rate of sink: 0.70 m/s (138 ft/min) with one occupant, 0.79 m/s (156 ft/m) with two.
- Wing loading: 14.4 kg/m^{2} (2.9 lb/sq ft) with two occupants
