= Bonomi BS.5 Ballerina =

Type of aircraft

BS.5 Ballerina

General information
- Type: Intermediate training glider
- National origin: Italy
- Manufacturer: Aeronautica Bonomi
- Designer: Camillo Silva
- Number built: 2

History
- First flight: 1934

The Bonomi BS.5 Ballerina (English: Wagtail) was a single seat, medium performance training glider designed and built in Italy in the 1930s.

== Design and development ==
The Ballerina was a high, braced wing aircraft. The wing was mounted on a central pedestal and had a central, straight edged, constant chord centre section, built in two parts, which occupied about a third of the span. There were straight tapered outer panels which carried the ailerons and ended at rounded tips. On each side a pair of V-shaped, faired, steel struts braced the outer ends of the centre section to the base of the fuselage.

The fuselage had an hexagonal cross-section with deep, almost upright sides, its upper surfaces curving down over the nose. It was entirely plywood covered. The cockpit was immediately in front of the wing leading edge, placing the pilot's head on the front of the pedestal. A wooden skid with a rubber shock absorbers ran along the underside to form an undercarriage, assisted by a small, faired tail skid. Under the trailing edge the fuselage dropped down from the pedestal then tapered to the rear. The tail surfaces were all straight tapered and square tipped, with almost all of the surfaces moving. Enough fixed fin and tailplane was retained to allow aerodynamic balancing via an inset hinge.

The Ballerina was capable of using both ridge and thermal lift. Pilots could use it to gain their C badge.

== Operational history ==
At least two Ballerinas were built, slightly different in dimensions and dihedral and the reconstructed pre-war Italian civil register suggests there may have been a third. Two spent some time in Egypt, brought in by Italians but operated by the Egyptian Aero Club.

== Specifications ==
Data from Pedrielli (2011) p.79

General characteristics

- Crew: One
- Length: 6.90 m (22 ft 8 in)
- Wingspan: 16.0 m (52 ft 6 in)
- Wing area: 16.60 m^{2} (178.7 sq ft)
- Aspect ratio: 15.40
- Empty weight: 130 kg (287 lb)
- Gross weight: 210 kg (463 lb)

Performance

- Maximum glide ratio: 22:1 estimated
- Rate of sink: 0.62 m/s (122 ft/min)
- Wing loading: 12 kg/m^{2} (2.5 lb/sq ft)
