= Bonomi BS.10 Ardea =

BS.10 Ardea

General information
- Type: Single seat competition glider
- National origin: Italy
- Manufacturer: Aeronautica Bonomi
- Designer: Camillo Silva
- Number built: 1

History
- First flight: 1934

The Bonomi BS.10 Ardea (English: Great Heron) was an Italian single seat high performance glider, designed and built in the mid-1930s. Only one was built.

== Design and development ==
The BS.10 Ardea was an attempt to improve upon the popular BS.2 Balestrucchio of 1932. Like the Balestruccio, the Ardea was a high gull wing aircraft but with increased span and aspect ratio and less gull dihedral. The two spar wing was built from three panels, the straight edged central one having constant chord. The outer panels straight tapered to elliptical tips, with trailing edges entirely occupied by ailerons. The outer ends of the centre section were braced, as on some other Bonomi gliders, with a pair of faired, asymmetric steel V-struts, mounted on the lower fuselage immediately below the forward wing spar. The wing was mounted over the fuselage on a short, faired pedestal.

The Ardea had a deep sided, hexagonal cross-section fuselage, entirely plywood skinned. Its pilot sat in a small, deep cockpit, head against the front of the pedestal and partly protected from the airstream by the upper fuselage panels, which both lifted off for entry. There was a conventional single skid undercarriage under the forward fuselage aft to the wing trailing edge, with a small tailskid. The fuselage tapered gently to the tail, where a large, roughly elliptical balanced rudder, mounted on a much smaller fin, extended down to the keel. The Ardea's balanced elevators together formed a slender ellipse in plan, though with a cut-out for rudder movement.

The BS.10 flew for the first time in 1934, and was first registered in September of that year. By November it was registered to the Royal Italian Aero Club, Rome. Only one was built.

== Specifications ==
Data from Pedrielli (2011) p.87

General characteristics

- Crew: One
- Length: 6.79 m (22 ft 3 in)
- Wingspan: 19.00 m (62 ft 4 in)
- Wing area: 17.60 m^{2} (189.4 sq ft)
- Aspect ratio: 20.50
- Empty weight: 140 kg (309 lb)
- Gross weight: 220 kg (485 lb)

Performance

- Maximum glide ratio: 26:1 estimated
- Rate of sink: 0.53 m/s (104 ft/min)
- Wing loading: 12.50 kg/m^{2} (2.56 lb/sq ft)
