= Bowlus BA-100 Baby Albatross =

American glider

BA-100 Baby Albatross
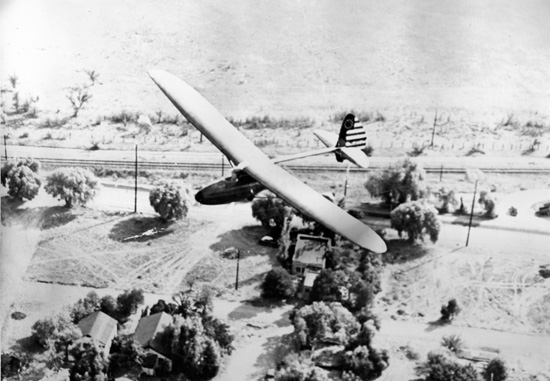
- A Bowlus BA-100 Baby Albatross in flight.

General information
- Type: Glider
- National origin: United States
- Manufacturer: Hawley Bowlus
- Designer: Hawley Bowlus
- Number built: 156 kits were sold

History
- Manufactured: 1938-1944
- Introduction date: 1938
- First flight: 1937

The Bowlus BA-100 Baby Albatross is an American high-wing, strut-braced, open cockpit, pod-and-boom glider that was designed by Hawley Bowlus and introduced in 1938.

== Design and development ==
Bowlus designed the Baby Albatross as an inexpensive glider during the Great Depression. The aircraft initially sold for US$750 ready-to-fly, and US$385 as a kit for amateur construction. Initially produced as a kit by Bowlus, the rights to the design were purchased in 1944 by Laister-Kauffmann, although that company went out of business before commencing production.

The BA-100 is of mixed construction. The wings and tail surfaces are of wooden structure, covered in aircraft fabric. The tailboom is made from a metal tube and the cockpit pod is of molded plywood. The aircraft features no glide-path control devices, although some were later modified with spoilers. The airfoil is a modified Gö 535 section.

The production of the BA-100 totaled 156 kits delivered.

== Operational history ==
Many well known soaring pilots owned and flew the BA-100 as their first aircraft. These include Dick Johnson, Richard Schreder and Joe Lincoln. Despite its modest performance the BA-100 has been flown on many flights of over 250 mi (402 km).

One BA-100 was modified by Schweizer Aircraft, replacing the plywood cockpit pod with a steel tube one.

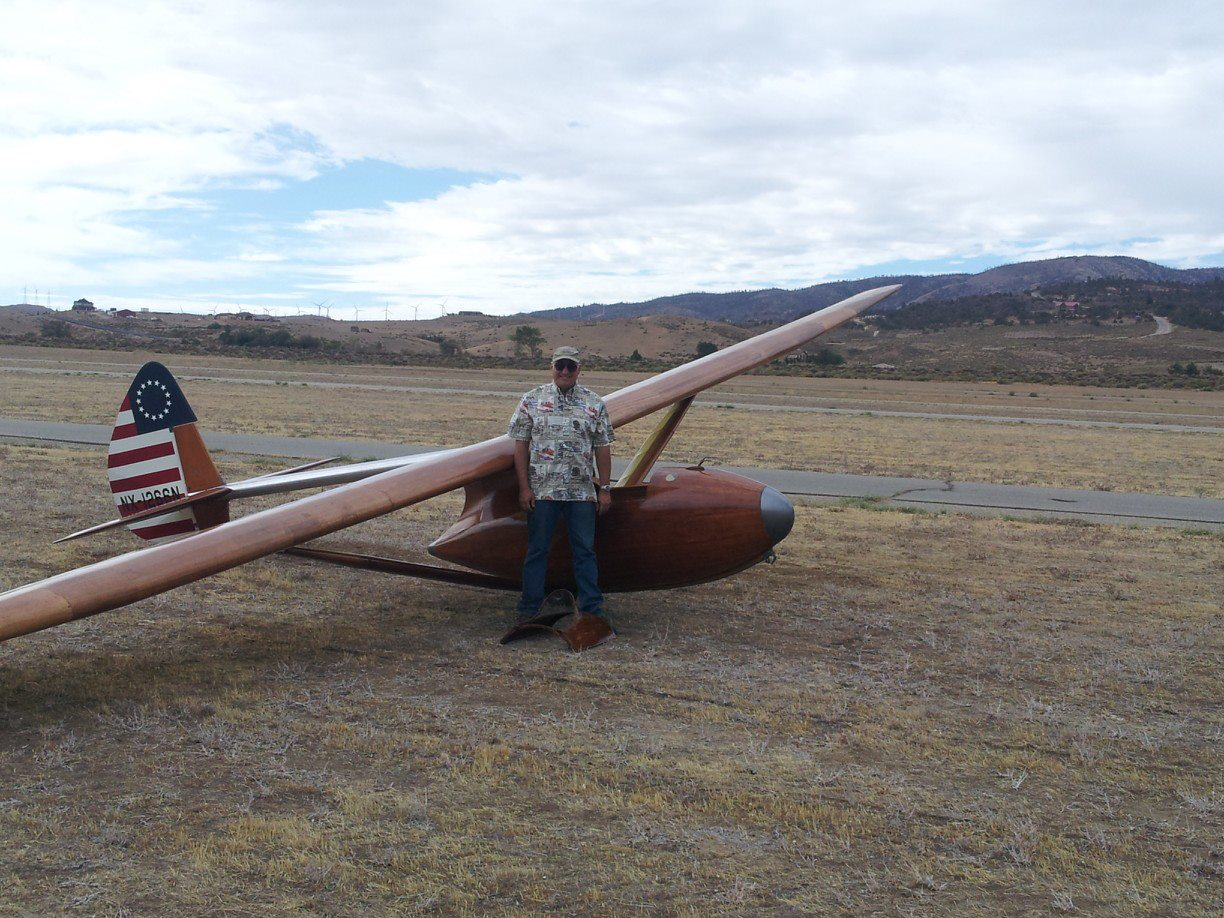
Jeff Byard just after landing his Baby Albatross at the ESA 2013 Western Workshop

The aircraft were known for their poor pitch handling characteristics. The famous aerodynamicist Irv Culver told Albatross owner Jeff Byard that the problem came from three sources. First, the rotation axis of the all flying horizontal tail was located at 35% chord instead of slightly in front of the aerodynamic center at 25% chord. Second, the horizontal tail rotation hinge had high friction. Third, the relatively soft pitch axis cable control system stored elastic energy reacting the friction in the tail hinge. As the pilot tried to input pitch controls into the unstable tail, the friction of the tailplane hinge prevented initial movement which then stored up energy in the control cables. The pilot then applied more force to get the desired reaction. Eventually, the high friction would break loose and the horizontal tail would move much farther than desired due to the higher than necessary force applied by the pilot and releasing the force in the control cables. The resulting over control often resulting in PIO and when near the ground would likely damage the aircraft. Culver instructed the owner to move the hinge axis forward to 24.5%, add a downspring to the pitch control, and liberally lubricate the hinge axis before each flight to reduce friction. According to Byard, the plane flies significantly better with the improvements.

As of September 2013 there were still 12 Baby Albatross on the US Federal Aviation Administration civil aircraft register.

== Variants ==
BA-100 Baby Albatross
Original single-seat version, type certified.
BA-102 Two-Place Baby Albatross
Two-seat version with extended rear fuselage by 2 ft (0.6 m) to accommodate a passenger, with two small portal-type windows. The first one was constructed by Bowlus and Don Mitchell in the winter of 1938. Three were built and registered as experimental aircraft.

== Aircraft on display ==
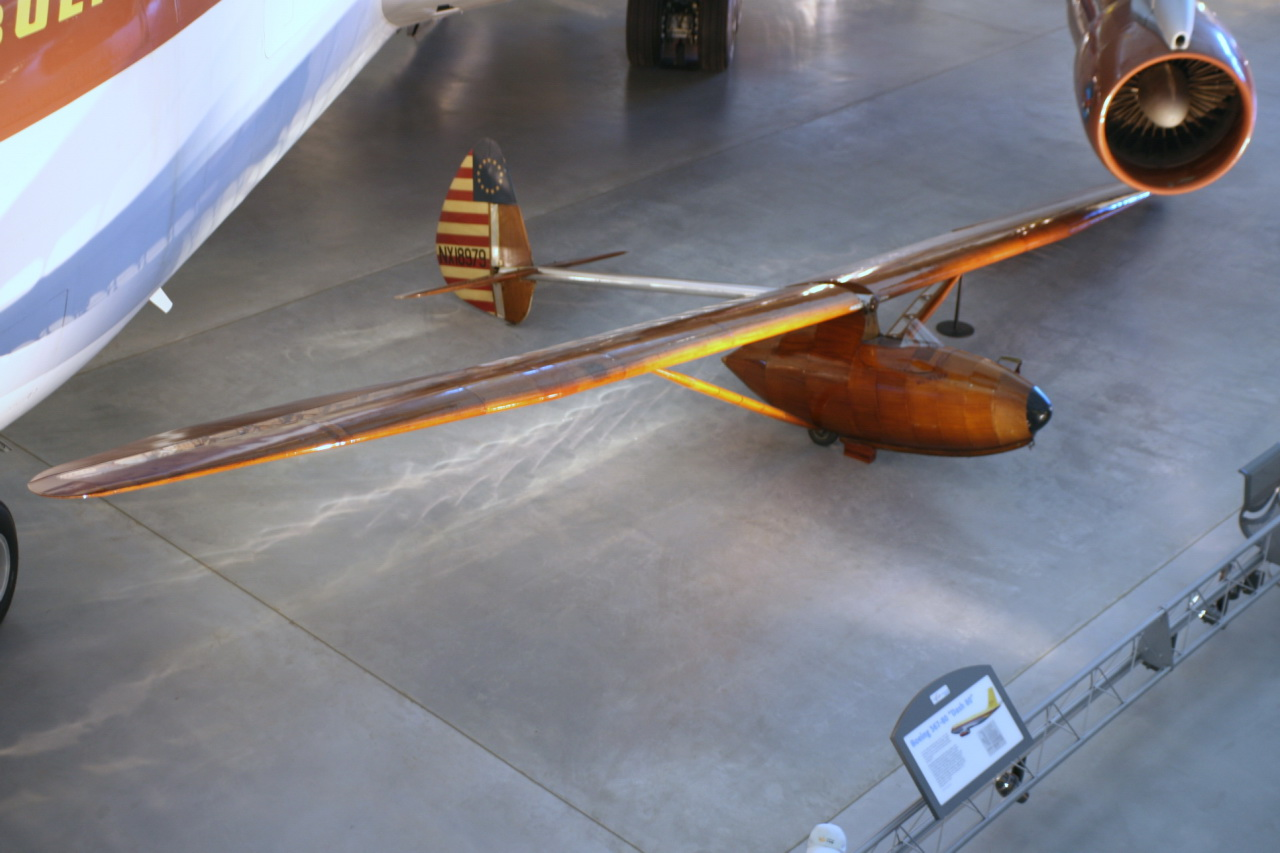
Bowlus BA-100 Baby Albatross on display at the Steven F. Udvar-Hazy Center.

- National Soaring Museum - BA-100 Baby Albatross and BA-102 two-place Baby Albatross (N33630)
- Steven F. Udvar-Hazy Center - BA-100 Baby Albatross (NX18979) is on display at this annex of the National Air and Space Museum
- The Seattle Museum of Flight - BA-100 Baby Albatross currently in restoration at Paine Field.
- Port Townsend Aero Museum - BA-100 Baby Albatross (NC17864).
- San Diego Air and Space Museum - BA-100 Baby Albatross.
- Western Antique Aeroplane & Automobile Museum - BA-100 Baby Albatross undergoing restoration.
- Wings of History Air Museum - BA-100 Baby Albatross.

== Specifications (BA-100) ==
Data from Sailplane Directory and Soaring Magazine

General characteristics

- Crew: one
- Wingspan: 44 ft 6 in (13.56 m)
- Wing area: 150 sq ft (14 m^{2})
- Aspect ratio: 13.2
- Airfoil: modified Gö 535
- Empty weight: 300 lb (136 kg)
- Gross weight: 505 lb (229 kg)

Performance

- Maximum glide ratio: 20:1
- Rate of sink: 135 ft/min (0.69 m/s)
- Wing loading: 3.3 lb/sq ft (16 kg/m^{2})
