= Bonomi BS.2 Balestruccio =

Italian sailplane

BS.2 Balestruccio

General information
- Type: High performance sailplane
- National origin: Italy
- Manufacturer: Aeronautica Bonomi
- Designer: Camillo Silva
- Number built: 1

History
- First flight: 1932

The Bonomi BS.2 Balestruccio (English: House Martin) was an Italian sailplane designed to set records. In 1932 it set a new national endurance record with a flight of over 25 minutes.

== Design and development ==
The Balestruccio was a single seat glider with a high aspect ratio gull wing built in four parts. The two inner panels, straight edged with constant chord and carrying dihedral, joined on top of the fuselage, their extremities braced from the lower fuselage with flat steel V-struts, encased in faired wood to reduce drag and assisted on each side by a pair of jury struts. The upper end of each strut was attached on one of the two wing spars. The outer wing panels were straight tapered, with rounded tips. There were differential ailerons on the outer trailing edges and flaps inboard.

The fuselage of the Balestruccio was hexagonal, with deep, near vertical sides. Its comfortable cockpit was immediately in front of the wing leading edge and was originally provided with a wooden canopy with small side openings, similar to that used on the German DFS Fafnir, but this was later replaced with a more conventional open arrangement which provided better all-round visibility. A single, sprung skid and a tail bumper provided an undercarriage. The fuselage tapered aft to a mid mounted horizontal tail consisting almost entirely of the elevator; although this had straight leading edges, a combination of their slight sweep and the full, rounded trailing edges gave the planform an almost elliptical appearance. There were aerodynamic balances and a large cut-out for rudder movement. As first constructed, the vertical tail was rather similar, with a small fin and a full, deep, curved, balanced rudder which extended slightly below the keel. Later, with the fuselage shortened by one frame or about 700 mm (28 in), the Balestruccio was given a new, angular fin and rudder with straight taper and square tip. Like the old rudder, this was also balanced and deep, though extending only to the keel. The original horizontal tail was retained.

== Operational history ==
The Balesruccio proved to be versatile and efficient and was flown by Vittorio Bonomi and Enrico Rolandi from Mottarone and Campo dei Fiori di Varese. On 18 December 1932 Rolandi flew it for 25.8 minutes, setting a new Italian national endurance record, covering 15.7 km (9.8 mi) and winning the Castiglione Trophy. As late as 1937, it was demonstrating its performance in Asiago.

== Specifications ==
Data from Pedrelli (2011) pp.70-1

General characteristics

- Crew: One
- Length: 7.55 m (24 ft 9 in) for the shortened aircraft. Zuerl gives 8.33 m (27 ft 4 in)
- Wingspan: 18.00 m (59 ft 1 in)
- Wing area: 17.14 m^{2} (184.5 sq ft)
- Aspect ratio: 18
- Empty weight: 125 kg (276 lb)
- Gross weight: 205 kg (452 lb)

Performance

- Maximum glide ratio: estimated 24:1
- Rate of sink: 0.58 m/s (114 ft/min)
- Wing loading: 11.50 kg/m^{2} (2.36 lb/sq ft)
