= Bowlus 1-S-2100 =

Bowlus 1-S-2100 Senior Albatross
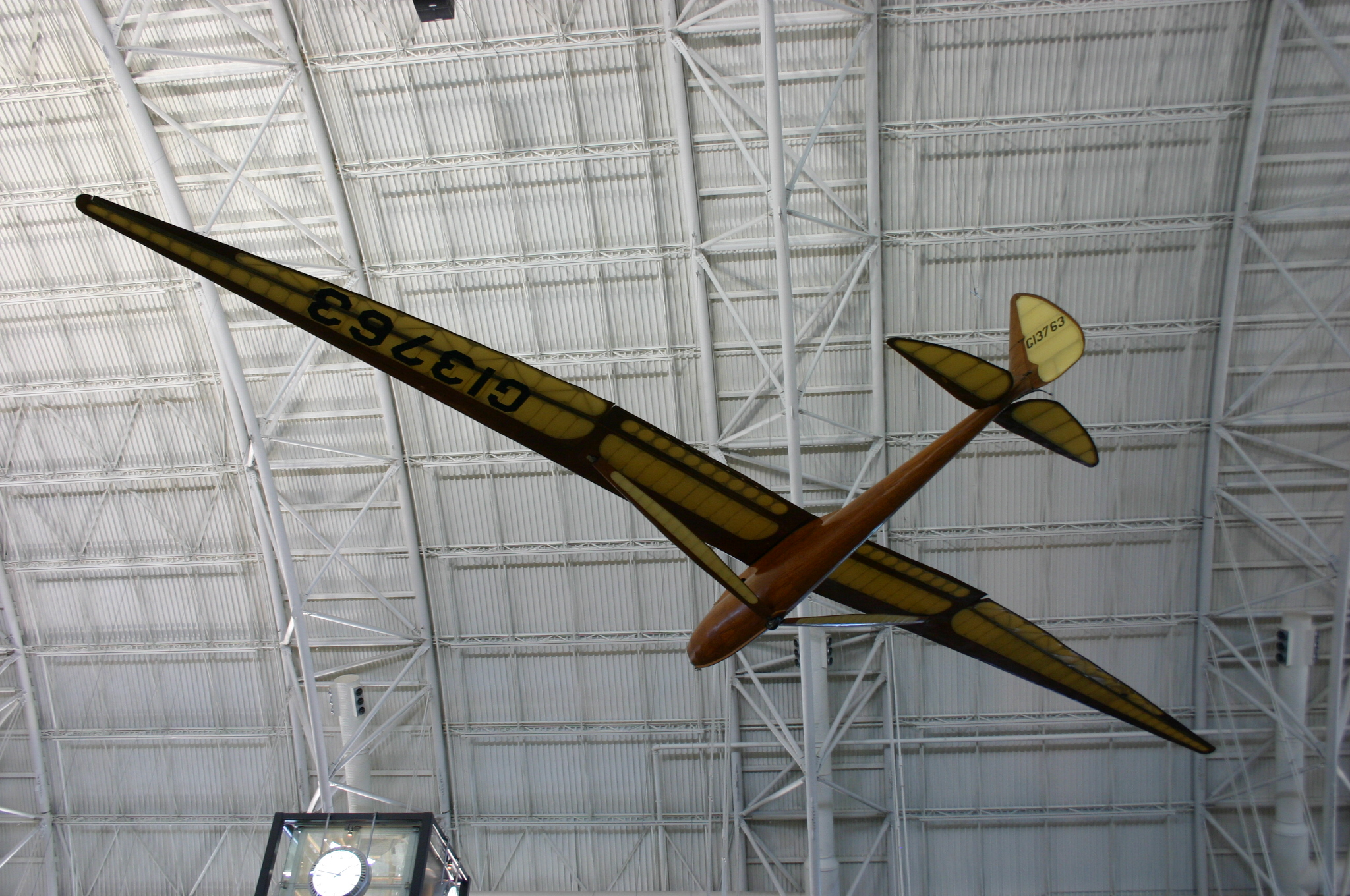

General information
- Type: Single-seat Glider
- National origin: United States
- Manufacturer: Bowlus Sailplane Company Ltd
- Designer: William Hawley Bowlus
- Number built: 6

History
- First flight: 1933

The Bowlus 1-S-2100 Senior Albatross is a 1930s single-seat glider designed by William Hawley Bowlus for Bowlus Sailplane Company Ltd. The aircraft is based on a prototype glider the "Super Sailplane" designed by Bowlus, and instructor Martin Schempp, built by students at the Curtiss-Wright Technical Institute.

== Specifications ==
Data from

General characteristics

- Crew: 1
- Wingspan: 61 ft 9 in (18.82 m)
- Wing area: 204.75 sq ft (19 m^{2})
- Aspect ratio: 18.72
- Empty weight: 340 lb (154 kg)
- Gross weight: 520 lb (236 kg)

Performance

== See also ==
Related lists

- List of Gliders
