= Ferrando Bertelli =

Italian engraver

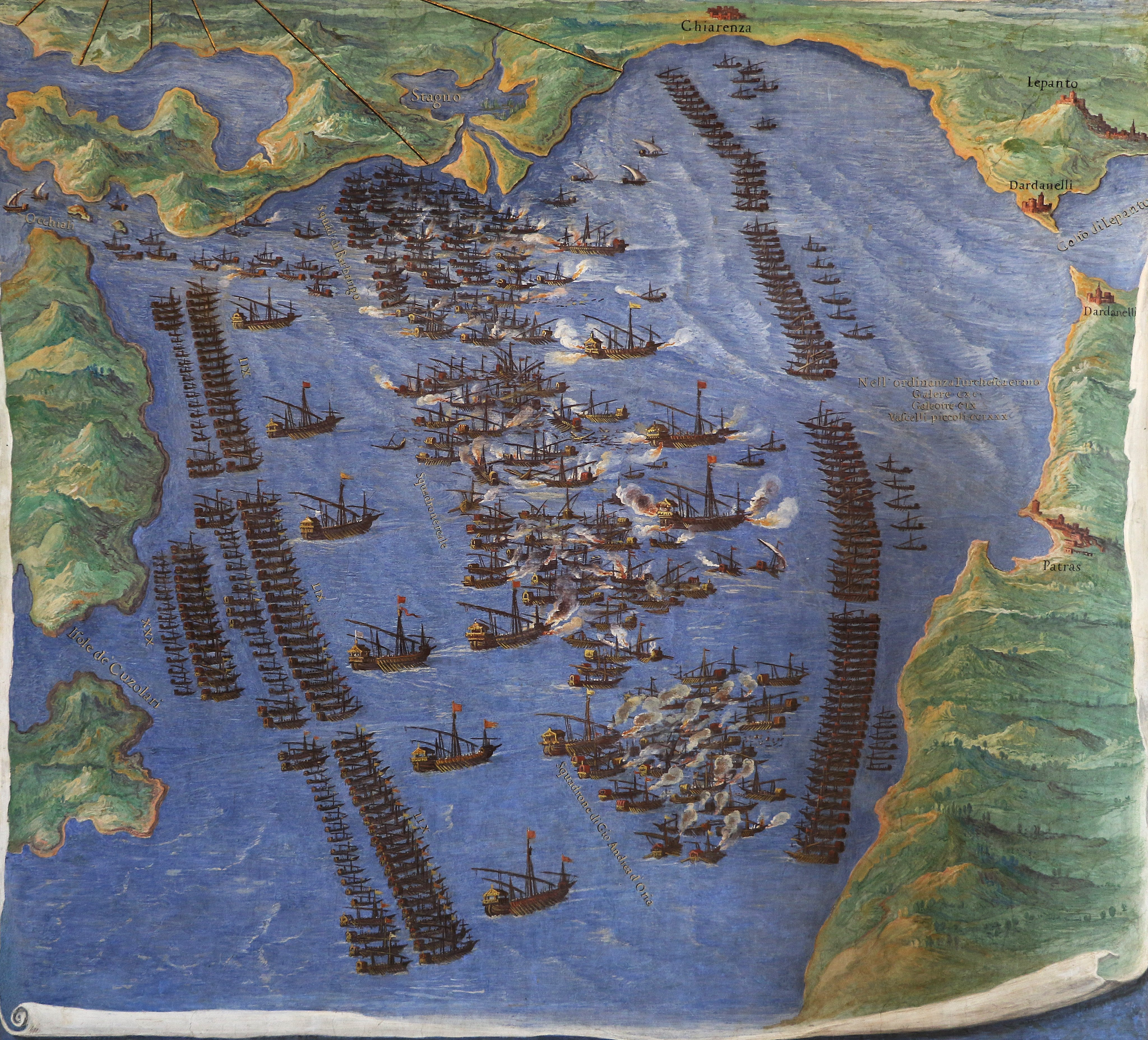
Ferrando Bertelli, Battle of Lepanto, Vatican Museums, 1572

Ferrando Bertelli (born c. 1525) was an Italian engraver of the Renaissance period. He was born in Venice.

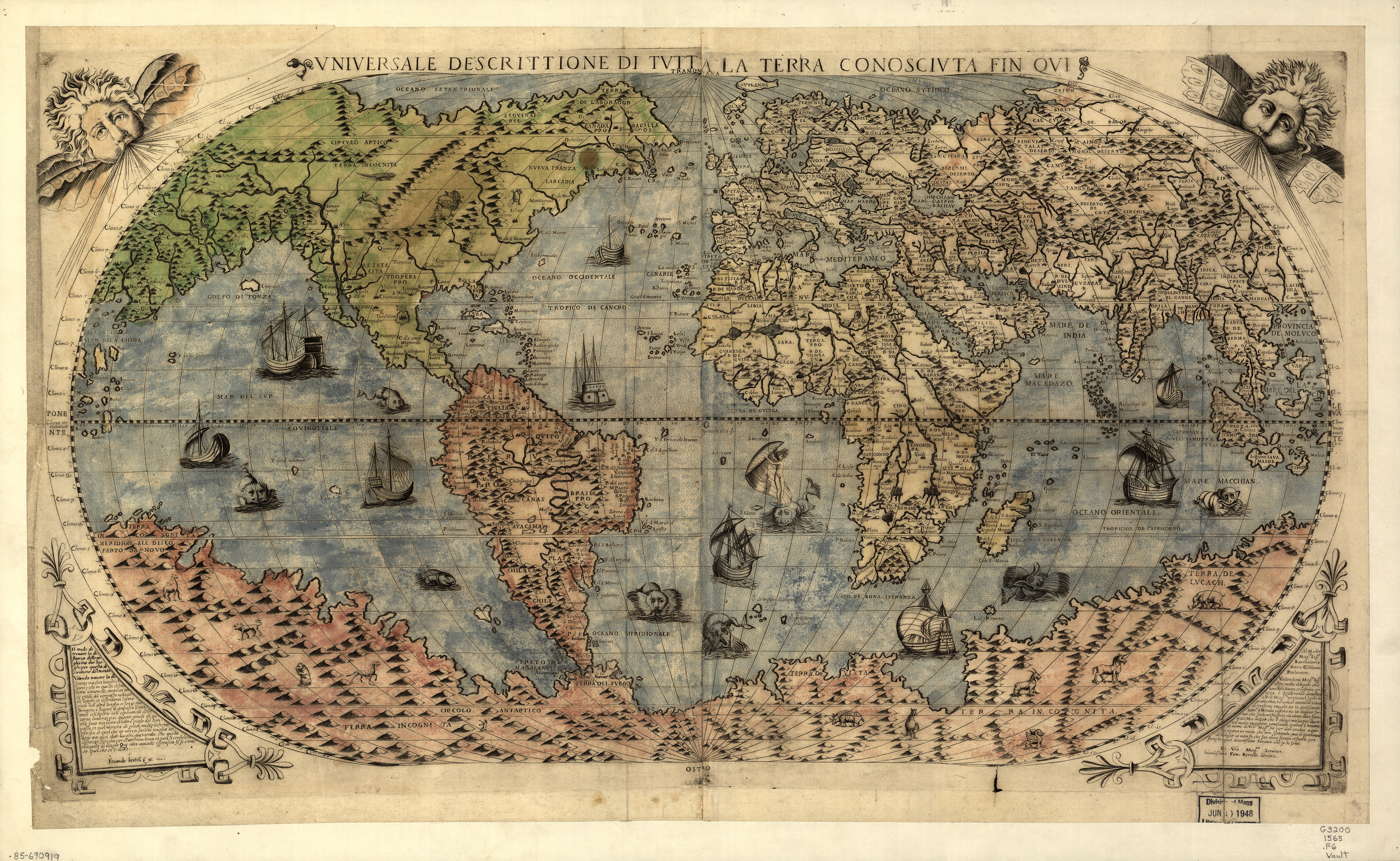
Ferrando Bertelli, Map of the known world, 1565

== Works ==
His known works include:

- Omnium fere gentium nostrae aetatis habitus, (1569);
- Christ curing the sick after Farinati (1530);
- The Crucifixion after Giulio Somalio;
- Venus and Cupid after Titian (1536);
- Specchio della Vita Humana (1566).
