= Bonomi BS.4 Basettino =

BS.4 Basettino

General information
- Type: Primary Primary glider
- National origin: Italy
- Manufacturer: Aeronautica Bonomi
- Designer: Camillo Silva

History
- First flight: c.1932

The Bonomi BS.4 Basettino (English: Bearded Tit) was a primary glider designed and built in Italy in the 1930s.

== Design and development ==
Like most 1930s primary gliders, the Basettino was a simple, high braced wing aircraft with a forward nacelle and an open frame rear fuselage. Its two spar, fabric covered wing had greater span and aspect ratio than most of its class and had a higher performance airfoil. A straight, constant chord centre section occupied most of the span, with straight tapered outer panels which carried the ailerons and had rounded tips. The wings were supported over the nacelle by a single, central N form strut, with an upright forward member and a sloping rear component. The latter defined the aft end of the nacelle and extended above the wing to form a flat, triangular pylon, from which a pair of landing wires ran to both spars on each side. Flying wires from a point on the lower nacelle directly beneath the tip of the pylon ran to the same positions on the wing underside.

The same sloping rear member of the N-strut was used to join the nacelle to the open rear fuselage. Two pairs of V-shaped steel tube struts were attached to it at the wing trailing edge and at its foot; the first was horizontal, the other upward sloping, and their rear meeting points were used to support the fabric covered empennage. These points were also wire braced from the wing underside. The tailplane, fitted between the end of the horizontal V, had straight edges and constant chord, with rectangular elevators. There was a central triangular fin and rectangular rudder, both extending above and below the tailplane; the rudder worked in a cut-out between the elevators.

The Basettino had a hexagonal section, plywood covered nacelle, with curved upper and lower surfaces. A deep, rubber sprung, wooden landing skid on most of its underside formed its undercarriage. The pilot's cockpit, comfortable though open and without a windscreen, was placed below the wing leading edge.

The first flight of the Basettino was probably in 1932, though all known registration are dated September 1931. The numbers built are also uncertain; Pedrielli reports that there is photographic evidence only for one example, though the rebuilt Italian register records four or five. The aircraft was capable of soaring and its performance was good enough for pilots to obtain their C certificate.

== Specifications ==
Data from Pedrielli (2011) p.77

General characteristics

- Crew: One
- Length: 5.90 m (19 ft 4 in)
- Wingspan: 12.11 m (39 ft 9 in)
- Wing area: 15.50 m^{2} (166.8 sq ft)
- Aspect ratio: 9.50
- Empty weight: 90 kg (198 lb)
- Gross weight: 160 kg (353 lb)

Performance

- Maximum glide ratio: 11:1 estimated
- Wing loading: 10.30 kg/m^{2} (2.11 lb/sq ft)
