= Bonomi BS.8 Biancone =

BS.8 Biancone

General information
- Type: Trainer glider
- National origin: Italy
- Manufacturer: Aeronautica Bonomi
- Designer: Camillo Silva
- Number built: 6

History
- First flight: c.1933
- Developed from: Bonomi BS.7 Allievo Italia

The Bonomi BS.8 Biancone (English: Short-toed Snake Eagle) was a single-seat training glider designed and built in Italy in the 1930s. It was developed from the Bonomi BS.7 Allievo Italia primary glider.

== Design and development ==
The BS.8 Biancone was a higher performance version of the BS.7 primary trainer. The two designs, both high-wing monoplanes, shared a fuselage boom, empennage and wing bracing struts, but the later type had a nacelle with a conventional open cockpit and a pedestal in place of the B.7's simple boom and open girder, together with a new wing of much higher aspect ratio.

The new wing was a wooden two spar structure, largely fabric-covered, like the old. The forward spar was close to the leading edge; from it forward around the edge the wing was plywood covered, forming a torque-resistant D-box; aft the covering was fabric. The rear spar was just behind mid-chord. The central panel, occupying a little under half the span, was straight-edged and had constant chord. Outboard the wing was straight tapered to rounded tips, ailerons occupying all the trailing edge. The centre section was supported by the fuselage pedestal and braced on each side by steel asymmetric V-form struts. These were fixed to the two spars close to the ends of the centre panels and to the fuselage boom directly below the leading edge. It had both a greater span and a lower area than that of the BS.7, increasing the aspect ratio from 7.5 to 12.4.

Like the BS.7, the BS.8 had a fuselage based on a slender, triangular-cross-section, plywood-covered beam, sloping upwards aft from below the leading edge to place the strut braced triangular tailplane at the same height as the wing, on top of a trapezoidal fin. The fin carried a deep, unbalanced rudder, rectangular except at the bottom where it was cropped to match the keel line of the boom. It worked in a notch between the two otherwise rectangular elevators, also unbalanced. The beam now extended to the nose, with a rubber-sprung landing skid attached below it, starting near the nose and reaching back almost to the wing trailing edge. The BS.8 had a conventional, fabric-covered upper fuselage or nacelle on top of the beam from its nose to well behind the trailing edge. The pilot's position was, as before, under the leading edge, but he was now in a "comfortable" cockpit with an "ovoid" seat.

The BS.8 flew for the first time in about 1933, having been first registered in July 1932. Six were built. For a time, one was fitted with floats so that it sat on water with its hull immersed and could be tow-launched behind a motor-boat.

== Specifications ==
Data from Pedrielli (2011) p.83

General characteristics

- Crew: One
- Length: 6.40 m (21 ft 0 in)
- Wingspan: 13.40 m (44 ft 0 in)
- Wing area: 14.50 m^{2} (156.1 sq ft)
- Aspect ratio: 12.40
- Empty weight: 115 kg (254 lb)
- Gross weight: 190 kg (419 lb)

Performance

- Maximum glide ratio: 14:1 estimated
- Rate of sink: 0.74 m/s (146 ft/min)
- Wing loading: 13.1 kg/m^{2} (2.7 lb/sq ft)
