= Bonomi BS.16 Allievo Bonomi =

BS.16 Allievo Bonomi

General information
- Type: Primary glider
- National origin: Italy
- Manufacturer: Aeronautica Bonomi
- Designer: Camillo Silva
- Number built: more than 60

History
- First flight: 1930

The Bonomi BS.16 Allievo Bonomi (English: Student Bonomi) was a single seat primary glider, designed and built in Italy in 1930 and widely used by flying clubs.

== Design and development ==
Despite its seemingly late type number, the BS.16 was one of the first aircraft designed by Camillo Silva after joining the company set up by Vittorio Bonomi in about 1930. Like many primary gliders of the period, its design was strongly influenced by the popular German Zögling. The two types differed chiefly in the detail of their open frame fuselages, the wing and fuselage bracing and the aileron area, though comparisons are not straightforward as there were many Zögling variants, all different in detail.

The BS.16's wings were, like the Zögling's, rectangular in plan apart from clipped aileron tips and mounted without dihedral. The two separate wings were built around two spars, one close to the leading edge with plywood covering forward from it around the edge forming a torsion-resistant D-box. Behind it the wing was fabric covered. One difference from a typical (Segelflugzeubau Kassel) Zögling was that the BS.16's ailerons were increased in length from 40% to nearly 60% of the span. The wings were braced with a pair of struts which ran separately from the lower fuselage frame, slightly diverging, to the wing spars. These removed the need for many of the wing bracing wires and for the triangular pylon of the Zögling to which they were attached.

The forward fuselage frame consisted of two, parallel horizontal members, one above the other. They were connected by a vertical pair of members and two diagonal ones, attached at two points on the lower frame and three on the upper. The rear vertical member was lighter than the forward three uprights, which formed a distorted N; together with the parallel horizontals, this core frame formed a cross braced trapezium. The forward vertical supported the wing at its front spar and the two diagonals met on the rear one. The lower frame extended forwards, with the pilot's seat projecting either side of it immediately ahead of the forward vertical frame. Underneath it, a curved skid was mounted and faired in, forming a long, deep, narrow box, reaching aft to the rear vertical frame. From the trailing edge rearwards the upper frame member was split into two, running parallel to each other and cross braced in the horizontal plane. This provided extra stiffness against sideways flexing and further reduced the wire bracing. Aft of the second vertical member the lower frame sloped upwards, meeting the upper member at the tail. Here, the triangular tailplane was mounted on the upper frame with a trapezoidal fin below. Parallel chord elevators projected behind with a cut-out for the movement of the tall rudder, which was hinged on the extreme frame and was rectangular apart from a cropped under edge. The BS.16 sat with its tail well clear of the ground, so no tail bumper was required, though there was a short aft horizontal extension of the main skid.

== Operational history ==
The Allievo Bonomi was well received by Italian gliding clubs, who used it to take novice pilots to their A certificate. More than sixty were sold.

== Specifications ==
Data from Pedrielli (2011) p.95

General characteristics

- Crew: One
- Length: 5.64 m (18 ft 6 in)
- Wingspan: 10.45 m (34 ft 3 in)
- Wing area: 17.80 m^{2} (191.6 sq ft)
- Aspect ratio: 6.10
- Empty weight: 110 kg (243 lb)
- Gross weight: 185 kg (408 lb)

Performance

- Maximum glide ratio: 10:1 estimated
- Wing loading: 10.40 kg/m^{2} (2.13 lb/sq ft)
