= Bonomi BS.7 Allievo Italia =

BS.7 Allievo Italia
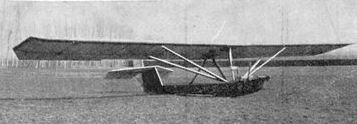

General information
- Type: Intermediate primary glider
- National origin: Italy
- Manufacturer: Aeronautica Bonomi
- Designer: Camillo Silva
- Number built: 8 or less

History
- First flight: 1929

The Bonomi BS.7 Allievo Italia (English: Italy student) was a single seat, primary glider designed and built in Italy in the 1920s.

== Design and development ==
The BS.7 was a primary glider in the Zögling tradition, with high wing and tail, the wings held above the pilot on a flat frame. Its wing and tail surfaces were very close to those of the much copied German glider. It was, though, structurally cleaner and simpler to rig, with most flying wires replaced by faired, steel V-form bracing struts and an empennage supported on a simple box beam rather than an extended central frame.

The extremely simple wing of the BS.7 was built around two spars, one close to the leading edge and the other near mid-chord. The upper ends of the bracing struts were attached to the underside of the spars at about 40% span and to the upper fuselage, at a position directly beneath the forward spar. There was only one bracing wire on each side, running from the top of the forward wing strut to the centre of the upper fuselage just aft of the trailing edge. The fabric covered wing was rectangular in plan apart from the aileron tips, which were obliquely cropped. It was mounted above the fuselage on a trapezoidal frame formed from three struts in a distorted, inverted N-shaped arrangement, the rear member sloping shallowly aft.

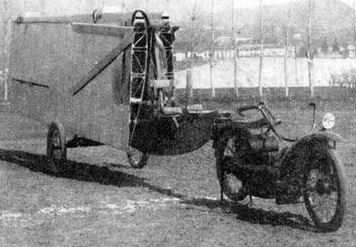
Bonomi BS.7 photo from L'Aerophile June 1932

The fuselage was a triangular cross-section, plywood covered box beam, inclined upwards to place the triangular tailplane at the same height as the wing, strut braced on top of a trapezoidal fin. The fin carried a deep, unbalanced rudder, rectangular except at the bottom where it was cropped to match the bottom line of the beam. It worked in a notch between the two otherwise rectangular elevators, also unbalanced. The completely exposed pilot's seat was on the upper surface of the forward end of the beam, just under the leading edge, where a narrower forward extension carried the rudder bar and, on its underside, the front end of a landing skid that reached below and behind the pilot.

The BS.7 was designed with transportability in mind and, with the wings detached and arranged along the fuselage beam, leading edges up, it could be towed behind a motorcycle on a two-wheeled trailer. Pilots could use it to gain their A and B badges.

Though the first flight was in 1929, the first BS.7s built did not appear on the Italian civil aircraft register until 1932. The number built is uncertain; Pedrielli states three, but eight appear on the reconstructed register.

== Specifications ==
Data from Pedrielli (2011) p.81

General characteristics

- Crew: One
- Length: 5.56 m (18 ft 3 in)
- Wingspan: 11.14 m (36 ft 7 in)
- Wing area: 16.70 m^{2} (179.8 sq ft)
- Aspect ratio: 7.50
- Empty weight: 90 kg (198 lb)
- Gross weight: 160 kg (353 lb)

Performance

- Maximum glide ratio: 10:1 estimated
- Wing loading: 9.6 kg/m^{2} (2.0 lb/sq ft)
