= List of British Standards =

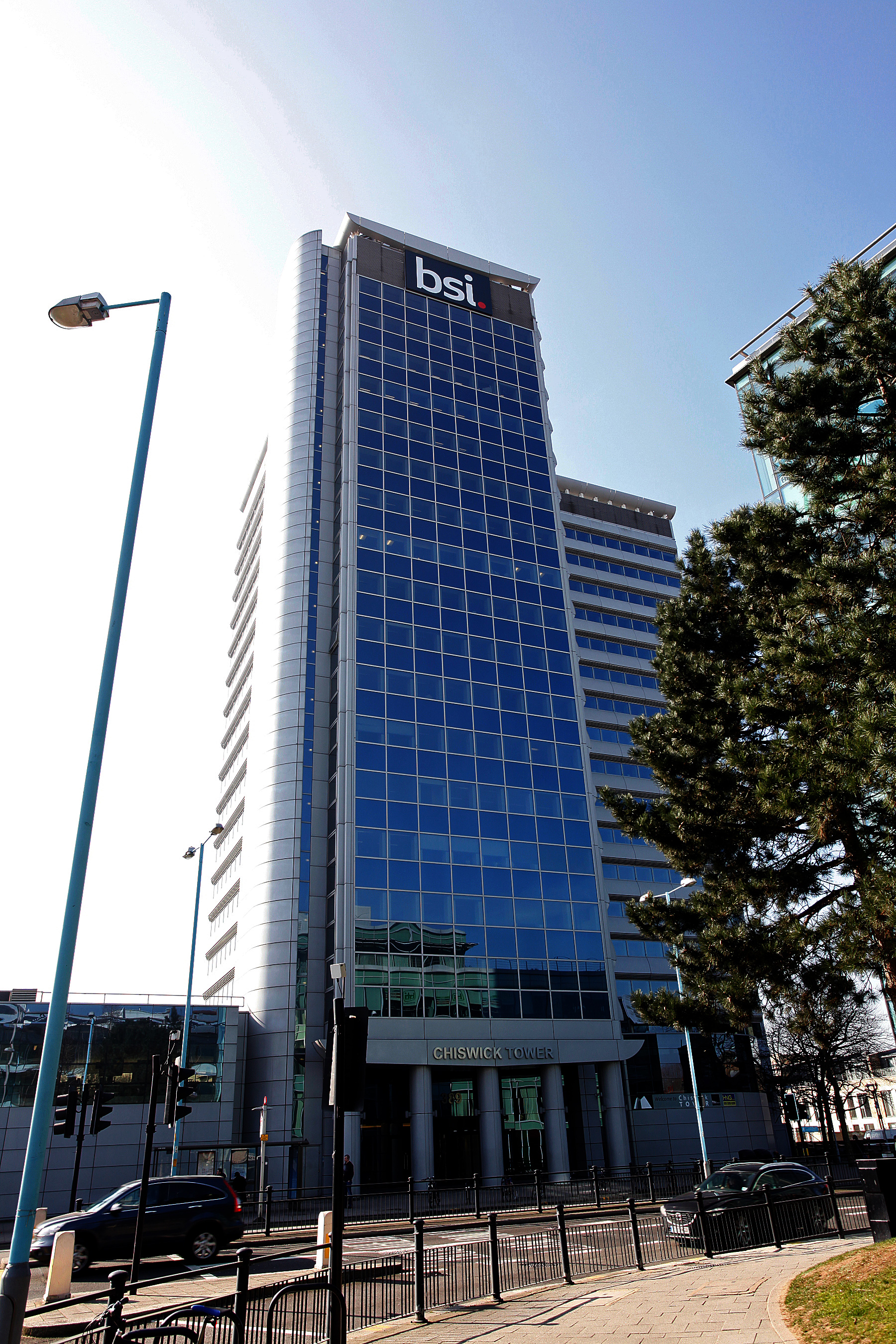
BSI Group headquarters building in Gunnersbury, London

British Standards are the standards produced by BSI Group which is incorporated under a Royal Charter (and which is formally designated as the National Standards Body (NSB) for the UK). The BSI Group produces British Standards under the authority of the Charter, which lays down as one of the BSI's objectives to:

Set up standards of quality for goods and services, and prepare and promote the general adoption of British Standards and schedules in connection therewith and from time to time to revise, alter and amend such standards and schedules as experience and circumstances require

— BSI Royal Charter, Faller and Graham.

== BS 0-98 ==
- BS 0 A standard for standards specifies Development, Structure and Drafting of British Standards themselves.
- BS 1 Lists of Rolled Sections for Structural Purposes
- BS 2 Specification and Sections of Tramway Rails and Fishplates
- BS 3 Report on Influence of Gauge Length and Section of Test Bar on the Percentage of Elongation
- BS 4 Specification for Structural Steel Sections
- BS 5 Report on Locomotives for Indian Railways
- BS 6 Properties of Rolled Sections for Structural Purposes
- BS 7 Dimensions of Copper Conductors Insulated Annealed, for Electric Power and Light
- BS 8 Specification for Tubular Tramway Poles
- BS 9 Specification and Sections of Bull Head Railway Rails
- BS 10 Tables of Pipe Flanges
- BS 11 Specifications and Sections of Flat Bottom Railway Rails
- BS 12 Specification for Portland cement
- BS 13 Specification for Structural Steel for Shipbuilding
- BS 14 Specification for Structural Steel for Marine Boilers
- BS 15 Specification for Structural Steel for Bridges, etc., and General Building Construction
- BS 16 Specification for telegraph material (insulators, pole fittings, etc.)
- BS 17 Interim Report on Electrical Machinery
- BS 18 Forms of Tensile Test Pieces
- BS 19 Report on Temperature Experiments on Field Coils of Electrical Machines
- BS 20 Report on BS Screw Threads
- BS 21 Report on Pipe Threads for Iron or Steel Pipes and Tubes
- BS 22 Report on Effect of Temperature on Insulating Materials
- BS 23 Standards for Trolley Groove and Wire,
- BS 24 Specifications for Material used in the Construction of Standards for Railway Rolling Stock
- BS 25 Report on Errors in Workmanship Based on Measurements Carried Out for the Committee by the National Physical Laboratory
- BS 26 Second Report on Locomotives for Indian Railways (Superseding No 5)
- BS 27 Report on Standard Systems of Limit Gauges for Running Fits
- BS 28 Report on Nuts, Bolt Heads and Spanners
- BS 29 Specification for Ingot Steel Forgings for Marine Purposes
- BS 30 Specification for Steel Castings for Marine Purposes
- BS 31 Specification for Steel Conduits for Electrical Wiring
- BS 32 Specification for Steel Bars for use in Automatic Machines
- BS 33 Carbon Filament Electric Lamps
- BS 34 Tables of BS Whitworth, BS Fine and BS Pipe Threads
- BS 35 Specification for Copper Alloy Bars for use in Automatic Machines
- BS 36 Report on British Standards for Electrical Machinery
- BS 37 Specification for Electricity Meters
- BS 38 Report on British Standards Systems for Limit Gauges for Screw Threads
- BS 39 Combined Report on BS Screw Threads
- BS 40 Specification for Spigot and Socket Cast Iron Low Pressure Heating Pipes
- BS 41 Specification for Spigot and Socket Cast Iron Flue or Smoke Pipes
- BS 42 Report on Reciprocating Steam Engines for Electrical Purposes
- BS 43 Specification for Charcoal Iron Lip-welded Boiler Tubes
- BS 44 Specification for Cast Iron Pipes for Hydraulic Power
- BS 45 Report on Dimensions for Sparking Plugs (for Internal Combustion Engines)
- BS 46 Specification for Keys and Keyways
- BS 47 Steel Fishplates for Bullhead and Flat Bottom Railway Rails, Specification and Sections of
- BS 48 Specification for Wrought Iron of Smithing Quality for Shipbuilding (Grade D)
- BS 49 Specification for Ammeters and Voltmeters
- BS 50 Third Report on Locomotives for Indian Railways (Superseding Nos. 5 and 26)
- BS 51 Specification for Wrought Iron for use in Railway Rolling Stock ('Best Yorkshire' and Grades A, B and C)
- BS 52 Specification for bayonet lamp-caps lampholders and B.C. adaptors (lampholder plugs)
- BS 53 Specification for Cold Drawn Weldless Steel Boiler Tubes for Locomotive Boilers
- BS 54 Report on Screw Threads, Nuts and Bolt Heads for use in Automobile Construction
- BS 55 Report on Hard Drawn Copper and Bronze Wire
- BS 56 Definitions of Yield Point and Elastic Limit
- BS 57 Report on heads for Small Screws
- BS 58 Specification for Spigot and socket Cast Iron Soil Pipes
- BS 59 Specification for Spigot and Socket Cast Iron Waste and Ventilating Pipes (for other than Soil Purposes)
- BS 60 Report of Experiments on Tungsten Filament Glow Lamps
- BS 61 Specification for Copper Tubes and their Screw Threads (primarily for domestic and similar work)
- BS 62 Screwing for Marine Boiler Stays,
- BS 63 Specification for Sizes of Broken Stone and Chippings
- BS 64 Specification for Fishbolts and Nuts for Railway Rails
- BS 65 Specification for Salt-Glazed Ware Pipes,
- BS 66 Specification for Copper-Alloy Three-Piece Unions (for Low and Medium Pressure Screwed Copper Tubes)
- BS 67 Specification for Two and Three-Plate Ceiling Roses
- BS 68 Method of Specifying the Resistance of Steel Conductor Rails
- BS 69 Report on Tungsten Filament Glow Lamps (Vacuum Type) for Automobiles
- BS 70 Report on Pneumatic Tyre Rims for Automobiles, Motor Cycles and Cycles
- BS 71 Report on Dimensions of Wheel Rims and Tyre Bands for Solid Rubber Tyres for Automobiles
- BS 72 British Standardisation Rules for Electrical Machinery,
- BS 73 Specification for Two-Pin Wall Plugs and Sockets (Five-, Fifteen- and Thirty-Ampere)
- BS 74 Charging Plug and Socket, for Vehicles Propelled by Electric Secondary Batteries, Specification for
- BS 75 Steels for Automobiles, Specification for Wrought
- BS 76 Report of and Specifications for Tar and Pitch for Road Purposes
- BS 77 Specification. Voltages for a.c. transmission and distribution systems
- BS 78 Specification for Cast Iron Pipes and Special Castings for Water, Gas and Sewage
- BS 79 Report on Dimensions of Special Trackwork for Tramways
- BS 80 Magnetos for Automobile Purposes
- BS 81 Specification for Instrument Transformers
- BS 82 Specification for Starters for Electric Motors
- BS 83 Standard of Reference for Dope and Protective Covering for Aircraft
- BS 84 Report on Screw Threads (British Standard Fine), and their Tolerances (Superseding parts of Reports Nos. 20 and 33)
- BS 85 Steel for aircraft for Government purchases in the U.S.A
- BS 86 Report on Dimensions of Magnetos for Aircraft Purposes
- BS 87 Report on Dimensions for Airscrew Hubs
- BS 88 Specification for cartridge fuses for voltages up to and including 1000 V a.c. and 1500 V d.c. Originally titled: “Specification for Electric Cut-Outs (Low Pressure, Type O)”
- BS 89 Specification for Indicating Ammeters, Voltmeters, Wattmeters, Frequency and Power-Factor Meters
- BS 90 Specification for Recording (Graphic) Ammeters, Voltmeters and Wattmeters
- BS 91 Specification for electric cable soldering sockets
- BS 92 Screw threads, British Standard Whitworth and their tolerances
- BS 93 Specification for British Association (B.A.) screw threads with tolerances for sizes 0 B.A. to 16 B.A.
- BS 94 Watertight glands for electric cables
- BS 95 Tables of Corrections to Effective Diameter required to compensate Pitch and Angle Errors in Screw Threads of Whitworth Form
- BS 96 Specification for carbon brushes (parallel-sided) for use on commutator and slip-ring machines
- BS 97 Waterproof electric light fittings
- BS 98 Specification for Goliath Lamp Caps and Lamp Holders

== BS 100-987C ==
- BS 100 Body spaces and frame ends for chassis for private automobiles (dimensions for)
- BS 3G 101 for general requirements for mechanical and electromechanical aircraft indicators
- BS 103 Specification for Falling Weight Testing Machines for Rails
- BS 104 Sections of Light Flat Bottom Railway Rails and Fishplates
- BS 105 Sections of Light and Heavy Bridge Type Railway Rails
- BS 107 Standard for Rolled Sections for Magnet Steel
- BS 196 for protected-type non-reversible plugs, socket-outlets cable-couplers and appliance-couplers with earthing contacts for single phase a.c. circuits up to 250 volts
- BS 275 Specification Dimensions of rivets
- BS 308 a now deleted standard for engineering drawing conventions, having been absorbed into BS 8888.
- BS 317 for Hand-Shield and Side Entry Pattern Three-Pin Wall Plugs and Sockets (Two Pin and Earth Type)
- BS 336 for fire hose couplings and ancillary equipment
- BS 372 for Side-entry wall plugs and sockets for domestic purposes (Part 1 superseded BS 73 and Part 2 superseded BS 317)
- BS 381 for colours used in identification, coding and other special purposes
- BS 476 for fire resistance of building materials / elements
- BS 499 Welding terms and symbols.
- BS 546 for Two-pole and earthing-pin plugs, socket-outlets and socket-outlet adaptors for AC (50–60 Hz) circuits up to 250V
- BS 857 for safety glass for land transport
- BS 970 Specification for wrought steels for mechanical and allied engineering purposes
- BS 984 Method for Determination of net mass of retail packages of knitting and rug yarns
- BS 987C Camouflage Colours

== BS 1,088-9,999 ==
- BS 1088 for marine plywood
- BS 1192 for Construction Drawing Practice. Part 5 (BS1192-5:1998) concerns Guide for structuring and exchange of CAD data.
- BS 1361 for cartridge fuses for a.c. circuits in domestic and similar premises
- BS 1362 for cartridge fuses for BS 1363 power plugs
- BS 1363 for mains power plugs and sockets
- BS 1377 Methods of test for soils for civil engineering.
- BS 1380 Speed and Exposure Index of Photographic Negative Materials.
- BS 1572 Colours for Flat Finishes for Wall Decoration
- BS 1870 for safety footwear.
- BS 1881 Testing Concrete
- BS 1852 Specification for marking codes for resistors and capacitors
- BS 1952 and BS 1953 – Copper alloy gate valves for general purposes. Superseded by BS 5154.
- BS 2060 Copper alloy screw-down stop valves for general purposes. Superseded by BS 5154.
- BS 2660 Colours for building and decorative paints
- BS 2777 Specification for asbestos-cement cisterns
- BS 2979 Transliteration of Cyrillic and Greek Letters
- BS 3262 Hot-applied thermoplastic road marking materials
- BS 3506 for unplasticized PVC pipe for industrial uses
- BS 3621 Thief resistant lock assembly. Key egress.
- BS 3943 Specification for plastics waste traps
- BS 4142 Methods for rating and assessing industrial and commercial sound
- BS 4293 for residual current-operated circuit-breakers
- BS 4343 for industrial electrical power connectors
- BS 4532 Specification for snorkels and face masks.
- BS 4573 Specification for 2-pin reversible plugs and shaver socket-outlets
- BS 4800 for paint colours used in building construction
- BS 4900 for vitreous enamel colours used in building construction
- BS 4901 for plastic colours used in building construction
- BS 4902 for sheet / tile floor covering colours used in building construction
- BS 4960 for weighing instruments for domestic cookery
- BS 4962 for plastics pipes and fittings for use as subsoil field drains
- BS 5145 Specification for lined industrial rubber boots.
- BS 5154 Specifications for two types of globe valves, globe stop and check valves, and check and gate valves, made out of one of two alloys of copper, zinc, lead, tin. This standard is a metric edition of BS 1952, BS 1953 and BS 2060.
- BS 5228 Code of practice for noise and vibration control on construction and open sites
- BS 5252 for colour-coordination in building construction
- BS 5306: Fire extinguishing installations
  - BS 5306-0:2011: Guide for the selection of installed systems and other fire equipment
  - BS 5306-1:2006: Hose reels and foam inlets
  - BS 5306-2:1990: Specification for sprinkler systems
  - BS 5306-3:2017: Fire extinguishing installations and equipment on premises. Commissioning and maintenance of portable fire extinguishers. Code of practice
  - BS 5306-4:2001+A1: 2012: Specification for carbon dioxide systems
  - BS 5306-8:2012: Fire extinguishing installations and equipment on premises
  - BS 5306-9:2015: Recharging of portable fire extinguishers – Code of practice
- BS 5400 for steel, concrete and composite bridges
- BS 5454 Recommendations for the storage and exhibition of archival documents
- BS 5499 for graphical symbols and signs in building construction; including shape, colour and layout
- BS 5544 for anti-bandit glazing (glazing resistant to manual attack)
- BS 5588 providing guidance on fire precautions in the design, construction, and use of buildings (multiple parts apply).
- BS 5750 for quality management, a predecessor of ISO 9000
- BS 5759 Specification for webbing load restraint assemblies for use in surface transport
- BS 5837 for protection of trees during construction work
- BS 5839 for fire detection and alarm systems for buildings
- BS 5930 for site investigations
- BS 5950 for structural steel
- BS 5975 Code of practice for temporary works procedures and the permissible stress design of falsework
- BS 5993 Specification for cricket balls
- BS 6008 for preparation of a liquor of tea for use in sensory tests
- BS 6312 for telephone plugs and sockets
- BS 6472 Guide to evaluation of human exposure to vibration in buildings
- BS 6651 code of practice for protection of structures against lightning; replaced by BS EN 62305 (IEC 62305) series.
- BS 6701 installation, operation and maintenance of telecommunications equipment and telecommunications cabling
- BS 6879 for British geocodes, a superset of ISO 3166-2:GB
- BS 7000 - Design management systems
  - Part 1 Design management systems. Guide to managing product design
  - Part 2 Design management systems. Guide to managing the design of manufactured products
  - Part 3 Design management systems. Guide to managing service design
  - Part 4 Design management systems. Guide to managing design in construction
  - Part 5 Design management systems. Design management systems. Guide to managing obsolescence
  - Part 6 Design management systems. Managing inclusive design. Guide
  - Part 10 Design management systems. Glossary of terms used in design management
- BS 7346-8: 2013 Components for smoke control systems: code of practice for planning, design, installation, commissioning and maintenance
- BS 7385 Evaluation and measurement for vibration in buildings
- BS 7430 code of practice for earthing
- BS 7671 Requirements for Electrical Installations, The IEE Wiring Regulations, produced by the IET.
- BS 7799 for information security, a predecessor of the ISO/IEC 27000 family of standards, including 27002 (formerly 17799)
- BS 7901 for recovery vehicles and vehicle recovery equipment
- BS 7909 Code of practice for temporary electrical systems for entertainment and related purposes
- BS 7971 Elastomer Insulated Fire Resistant (limited circuit integrity) cables for fixed wiring in ships and on mobile and fixed offshore units
- BS 7919 Electric cables. Flexible cables rated up to 450/750V, for use with appliances and equipment intended for industrial and similar environments
- BS 7910 guide to methods for assessing the acceptability of flaws in metallic structures
- BS 7925 Software testing
- BS 7971 Protective clothing and equipment for use in violent situations and in training
- BS 8110 for structural concrete
- BS 8210:2012 Guide to facilities maintenance management, replaced by BS 8210:2020 Facilities maintenance management. Code of practice.
- BS 8233 Guidance on sound insulation and noise reduction in buildings
- BS 8418 Design, Installation, Commissioning and Maintenance of Detection-Activated Video Surveillance Systems (VSS)
- BS 8442 Miscellaneous road traffic signs and devices - requirements and test methods
- BS 8484 for the provision of lone worker device services
- BS 8485 for the characterization and remediation from ground gas in affected developments
- BS 8494 (2007), for portable apparatuses detecting and measuring carbon dioxide levels in ambient air or extraction systems
- BS 8534:2011 Construction procurement policies, strategies and procedures: Code of practice
- BS 8546 Travel adaptors compatible with UK plug and socket system.
- BS 8572:2018 Procurement of Facility-Related Services Code of Practice: developed to establish a common and standardised approach towards the way in which facilities services are both specified and managed
- BS 8636 The voluntary standards provide a specification on the production process for UK-made whisky being sold here or traded globally.
- BS 8647 Respiratory equipment - Full-face snorkel masks - Specification
- BS 8888 for engineering drawing and technical product specification
- BS 8900-1 Managing sustainable development of organizations.
- BS 8900-2 Managing sustainable development of organizations. Framework for assessment against BS 8900-1
- BS 9997 Fire risk management systems.
- BS 9999 Fire safety in the design, management and use of buildings. Code of practice

== BS 15,000-10,008 ==
- BS 15000 for IT Service Management (ITIL), now ISO/IEC 20000
- BS 10008 best practice for the implementation and operation of electronic information management systems

== BS EN standards ==
- BS EN ISO 4210: Safety requirements for bicycles.
- BS EN 12195 Load restraining on road vehicles.
- BS EN 15331:2011 Criteria for design, management and control of maintenance services for buildings
- BS EN ISO 41012 Facility management – Guidance on strategic sourcing and the development of agreements
- BS EN 50291-2:2019: Electrical apparatus for the detection of carbon monoxide in domestic premises. Also covers electrical apparatus for continuous operation in a fixed installation in recreational vehicles and similar premises, including recreational craft, and additional test methods and performance requirements. Replaced an earlier 2010 edition (BS EN 50291-2:2010).
- BS EN 60204 Safety of machinery
- BS EN 61184:2017 Bayonet lampholders, fourth edition.
