= Bowlus (disambiguation) =

Bowlus may refer to:

== People ==
- Hawley Bowlus (1896–1967), American aircraft designer
- Noah Bowlus (1830–1904), American politician from Maryland
- Stephen R. Bowlus (1822–1894), American politician from Maryland

== Places ==
- Bowlus, Minnesota, city in Minnesota, United States

== Vehicles ==
- Bowlus, travel trailer
- Bowlus 1-S-2100, American glider
- Bowlus BA-100 Baby Albatross, American glider
- Bowlus Bennett, American aircraft
- Bowlus BS-100 Super Albatross, American glider
- Bowlus BZ-1, American glider
- Bowlus CG-7, United States Army transport glider prototype
- Bowlus CG-8, United States Army transport glider
- Bowlus Dragonfly, American glider
- Bowlus SP-1 Paperwing, American glider
- Bowlus TG-12, United States Army transport glider design
- Bowlus-Criz MC-1, United States Army Air Forces glider

== Other ==
- Bowlus Mill House, historic home
- Palmer-Bowlus Flume, wastewater flow measurement tool

== See also ==
- Bowles (disambiguation)
