= Boel =

Böel is a municipality in Schleswig-Holstein, Germany.

Böel or Boel may also refer to:

== Surname ==
- Princess Delphine of Belgium, previously known as Delphine Boël (born 1968), Belgian artist and member of the Belgian royal family
- Cornelis Boel (c. 1576–c. 1621), Flemish draftsman and engraver
- Gustave Boël (1837–1912), Belgian industrialist and politician, father of Pol Clovis Boël
- Hanne Boel (born 1957), Danish singer
- Henning Boel (born 1945), Danish former footballer
- Mariann Fischer Boel (born 1943), Danish politician
- Pieter Boel (1622–1674), Flemish painter, printmaker and tapestry designer
- Pol Boël (1923–2007), Belgian industrialist and politician
- Pol Clovis Boël (1868–1941), Baron Boël, Belgian industrialist and politician
- Quirijn Boel (1620–1668), Flemish engraver
- René Boël (1899–1990), Belgian industrialist, father of Poel and Yves Boël
- Rik Boel (1931–2020), Belgian politician and judge
- Yves Boël (1927–2012), Belgian businessman

== Given name ==
- Boel Berner (born 1945), Swedish sociologist, historian and editor
- Boel Flodgren (born 1942), Swedish professor of business law

== See also ==
- Frans Boels (c. 1555–1596), Flemish painter and draftsman
- Bodil (given name), of which Boel is a spelling variation
- Boele (name)
- Boell, a surname
