= Bol =

Bol or BOL may refer to:

== Entertainment ==
- BOL (band), a Norwegian electronica band
- Bol (music), a vocal percussion practice in North Indian classical music
- Bol (film), a 2011 Pakistani film directed by Shoaib Mansoor
  - Bol (soundtrack)
- BOL Network, a Pakistani media group

== Places ==
- Bol (Swabian Jura)
- Bol, Chabahar, Iran
- Bol, Chad, a city in Chad
- Bol, Croatia, a town on the Croatian island of Brač
- Bol, Mazandaran, Iran
- Boľ, a village in eastern Slovakia
- Bol, Split, an administrative division of Split, Croatia

== Other ==
- Bol (surname)
- BOL (engineering), the abbreviation for Beginning of Operational Life
- bol.com, a Dutch online web shop
- Bol Airport, an airport on the Croatian island of Brač
- Bol loop, an algebraic structure
- Bill of lading, a document acknowledging specified goods as cargo
- Brasil Online, an Internet portal
- Bread of Life Ministries International, a non-denominational Christian megachurch in the Philippines
- MF Bol (built 2005), a ferry owned by Croatian shipping company Jadrolinija
- 2-Bromo-LSD, a pharmacological agent
- BOL or BOLO in law enforcement parlance, the abbreviation for "Be On the Lookout" (see all-points bulletin)
- BOL, country code for Bolivia
- Bol., the abbreviated botanical author citation of Henry Nicholas Bolander
- Bug Out Location, a term for Retreat

== See also ==
- Boll (disambiguation)
- Bole (disambiguation)
- Bols (disambiguation)
- Bowl (disambiguation)
- Croatian Bol Ladies Open, a tennis tournament
