= John Bowes =

John Bowes may refer to:

- John George Bowes (c. 1812–1864), Canadian politician
- John Bowes (art collector) (1811–1885), English art collector and thoroughbred racehorse owner
  - John Bowes (steamship), 1852 steam collier, named after the art collector
- John Bowes, 1st Baron Bowes (1691–1767), Lord Chancellor of Ireland
- John Bowes, 9th Earl of Strathmore and Kinghorne (1737–1776), British peer
- John Bowes, 10th Earl of Strathmore and Kinghorne (1769–1820), British peer
- John Bowes (Australian politician) (1843–1897), New South Wales colonial politician
- John Bowes (speaker) (c. 1383 – c. 1444), Speaker of the House of Commons of England, 1435
- John Bowes (preacher) (1804–1874), English preacher
- John Bowes (cricketer) (1918–1969), Lancashire cricket player
- John Bowes (footballer) (1874–1955), English football forward

== See also ==
- John Bowe (disambiguation)
- Bowes (disambiguation)
