= Boll =

Boll or Bolls may refer to:

- Boll (surname)
- Boll, an obsolete Scottish measure of volume
- BOLL, a protein in humans
- 7873 Böll, a main-belt asteroid
- Boll case, a 1958 International Court of Justice case
- Boll KG, Uwe Boll's personal production company
- Boll, the protective case in which cotton grows
- Boll, a community in the municipality of Vechigen, Switzerland
- Boll, former German name of Bulle, Switzerland

== See also ==
- Bad Boll, a municipality in Germany
- Bol (disambiguation)
- Bolling (disambiguation)
- Bølling (disambiguation)
- Boell, a surname
