= Boele =

Boele is a Dutch name. It may refer to:

- Nicolette Boele, Australian politician
- Hein Boele, Dutch voice actor
- Boele Staal, Dutch politician

== See also ==
- Pieter Boeles (1795–1875), Dutch Minister and linguist
- Boel (disambiguation)
- Boell, a surname
