= Bolling =

The origins of the surname Bolling: English: from a nickname for someone with close-cropped hair or a large head, Middle English bolling "pollard", or for a heavy drinker, from Middle English bolling "excessive drinking". German (Bölling): from a pet form of a personal name formed with Germanic bald "bold", "brave" (see Baldwin). Swedish: either an ornamental name composed of Boll + the suffix -ing "belonging to", or possibly a habitational name from a place named Bolling(e).

Bolling may refer to:

- Bolling, Alabama
- Bolling Air Force Base, Washington, D.C.

== People with the surname ==
- Alexander R. Bolling (1895–1964), U.S. Army officer
- Bill Bolling (born 1957), Lieutenant Governor of Virginia
- Bruce Bolling (1945–2012), first black president of the Boston City Council
- Claude Bolling (1930–2020), French jazz pianist
- Destiny Levere Bolling, American politician
- Edith Bolling Galt Wilson (1872–1961), second wife of Woodrow Wilson
- Eric Bolling (born 1963), financial news and political television personality
- Frank Bolling (1931–2020), American baseball second baseman
- John Bolling, (1676–1729), early American colonist, farmer, and politician
- Julian Bolling, (born 1966), Sri Lankan swimmer
- Landrum Bolling (1913–2018), American educator and diplomat
- Leslie Garland Bolling (1898–1955), an African-American sculptor from Virginia
- Milt Bolling (1930–2013), American baseball infielder and brother of Frank Bolling
- Phillip S. Bolling (1849–1892), African-American politician and former slave
- Raynal Bolling (1877–1918), U.S. Army officer
- Richard Walker Bolling (1916–1991), American politician
- Robert Bolling (1646–1709), early American colonist and Jane Rolfe's husband
- Royal L. Bolling (1920–2002), Massachusetts politician, war hero
- Ruben Bolling (born 1963), American cartoonist
- Samuel P. Bolling (1819–1900), African-American politician and former slave
- Spottswood Bolling, plaintiff in the Civil Rights lawsuit Bolling v. Sharpe (1954)
- Tiffany Bolling (born 1947), American actress, model and singer
- Tyra Bolling (born 1985), African-American singer, songwriter, and entrepreneur

== See also ==
- Bølling (disambiguation)
- Boll, a German surname
