= Samuel Bolling =

Samuel Bolling may refer to:

- Samuel P. Bolling (1819–1900), African-American landowner, former slave and politician in the Virginia House of Delegates
- Samuel M. Bolling (1846–1927), American politician in the Virginia House of Delegates
