= Bodil (given name) =

- Gender: Female
- Name day: 26 January

Origin
- Origin: Old Norse
- Meaning: commanding

Other names
- Alternative spelling: Bothild

Bodil in Danish and Norwegian, in Swedish also the variations Bothild, Botilda, and Boel, is a feminine given name. It is Latinized form of Old Norse Bóthildr from bót "remedy" + hildr "battle". Older variations include Botill, Botild, Botilla, and Botyld.

The Swedish name day for Bodil and for Boel is 26 January.

Notable people with the name include:

- Bodil Arnesen (born 1967), Norwegian operatic soprano
- Bodil Boserup (1921–1995), Danish politician
- Bodil Katharine Biørn (1871–1960), Norwegian missionary
- Bodil Begtrup (1903–1987), Denmark's first female ambassador
- Bodil Branner (born 1948), Danish mathematician
- Bodil Cappelen (1930–2026), Norwegian painter, textile artist, and book illustrator
- Bodil Dybdal (1901–1992), Danish lawyer and judge
- Bodil Finsveen (1934–2008), Norwegian politician
- Bodil Hauschildt (1861–1951), Danish photographer
- Bodil Hellfach (1856–1941), Danish nurse
- Bodil Holmström (born 1981), Finnish orienteering competitor
- Bodil Ipsen (1889–1964), Danish actress and film director
- Bodil Joensen (1944–1985), Danish pornographic actress
- Bodil Jönsson (born 1942), Swedish physicist and author
- Bodil Jørgensen (born 1961), Danish film actress
- Bodil Kaalund (1930–2016), Danish painter, textile artist, and writer
- Bodil Kjær (born 1932), Danish architect, furniture designer, and professor
- Bodil Kjer (1917–2003), Danish actress
- Bodil Koch (1903–1972), Danish politician
- Bodil Kornbek (born 1961), Danish politician
- Bodil Malmsten (1944–2016), Swedish poet and novelist
- Bodil Mårtensson (born 1952), Swedish author
- Bodil Niska (born 1954), Norwegian jazz musician
- Bodil Rasmussen (born 1957), Danish rower
- Bodil Rosing (1877–1941), Danish-American actress
- Bodil Russ (1908–1998), Norwegian equestrian
- Bodil Ryste (born 1979), Norwegian ski mountaineer and cross-country skier
- Bodil Schmidt-Nielsen (1918–2015), Danish-American physiologist
- Bodil Thirstedt (1916–?), Danish sprint canoer
- Bodil Udsen (1925–2008), Danish actress
- Bodil Valero (born 1958), Swedish politician
