= Bowe =

Bowe is an English and Irish surname. In Ireland it represents at least one distinct family, the surname originally Ó Buadhaigh meaning victorious. People with this name include:

- Alice Bowe, English garden designer
- Brittany Bowe, American speed skater
- Dante Bowe, American musician
- David Bowe (actor) (21st century), American film actor
- David Bowe (politician) (born 1955), British politician
- Dwayne Bowe (born 1984), American football player
- Frank Bowe (1947–2007), disability rights activist, author, and teacher
- John Bowe (actor) (born 1950), English actor
- John Bowe (author) (born 1964), American journalist
- John Bowe (1911–1990), Australian footballer
- John Bowe (racing driver) (born 1954), Australian racing driver
- Len Bowe (1885–1954), Australian footballer
- Riddick Bowe (born 1967), American boxer
- Rosemarie Bowe (1932–2019), American actress
- Steph Bowe (1994–2020), Australian author and public speaker
- Tommy Bowe (born 1984), Irish rugby player

== Given name ==
- Bowe Bergdahl, US Soldier captured in Afghanistan in July 2009

== Places ==
- Bowé, in Guinea

== See also ==
- Bow (disambiguation)
- Bowes (disambiguation)
- Bowie (disambiguation)
