= John Bowe =

John Bowe may refer to:

- John Bowe (actor) (born 1950), English television actor
- John Bowe (author) (born 1964), American journalist
- John Bowe (footballer) (1911–1990), Australian rules footballer
- John Bowe (racing driver) (born 1954), Australian racing driver
- John Bowe (financier) (born c. 1963), Irish banker
- John Bowe (MP), Member of Parliament (MP) for Taunton

== See also ==
- John Bowes (disambiguation)
