= Bols =

Bols may refer to:

- Bol (music), an element of Indian rhythm
- Lucas Bols, a Dutch distilling company
- Bols (brand), a beverage brand name used by Lucas Bols
- Bols (surname), a Dutch surname
- Bell of Lost Souls Interactive, American online publisher and marketing service company

== See also ==
- Bol (disambiguation)
- Bowles (disambiguation)
