= Sterlings Mobile =

Mobile barbershop in San Diego, California

Sterlings Mobile Salon & Barber Co.
- Company type: Private
- Industry: Hair care
- Founded: 2012; 14 years ago
- Founders: Kush Kapila
- Headquarters: San Diego, United States
- Area served: California
- Products: beauty salon, Barber services
- Website: sterlingsmobile.com

Sterlings Mobile (stylized as STERLINGS Mobile) is an American salon and barber service operating out of customized Airstream mobile units. It was established in San Diego in 2012.

A particular innovation of Sterlings Mobile is its partnership with corporations. Targeting "busy professionals", the barber shop makes regular stops at company properties, where it is subsidized by them. The company also provides custom airstream mobile units for a number of different uses in addition to the barber shop and beauty salons.

== History ==
The company's founder and CEO, Kush Kapila, was inspired by increasingly popular mobile services such as food trucks and pet grooming. His idea for a mobile salon and barber shop won first place at the 2011 UCSD Entrepreneur challenge for a consumer product.

After raising $185,000 of funding, Kapila retrofitted an Airstream trailer as a classic barber shop. Sterlings Mobile launched in 2012 in the greater San Diego area. By August 2013, Sterlings Mobile had a customer following of 1,300.

While it started out just doing cuts, the company branched out in the first three years to be a full-service salon and barbershop for men and women, providing other services such as colors, shaves, and threading. By 2015, Sterlings Mobile had multiple Airstreams in operation. In 2016 Sterlings added the promotional tour and events division, wrapping the Airstream unit with brand images of companies such as Warner Bros. or Walgreens to provide promotional activities across the United States. By 2018, Sterlings Mobile had over 25 unique locations in San Diego.

In 2019, Sterlings Mobile partnered with The Art of Shaving and expanded services to Orange County. Launching at 4 locations around Irvine and Costa Mesa, Sterlings Mobile quickly established itself as the premier mobile salon and barber shop in Southern California. Expansion to the southern Bay Area was planned for early 2020, but this was halted due to the 2020 COVID-19 pandemic.
