= Bodil =

Bodil may refer to:

- Bodil Awards, Danish film awards
- Bodil (given name), a feminine given name
- Cyclone Bodil, a 2013 winter storm that affected northern Europe
- 3459 Bodil, an asteroid
