= Kolling =

Origin
- Origin: German
- Region of origin: Germany, Danmark

Kolling, Kölling or Kølling is a surname:

- Carl Kolling
- Fabio Kolling, Brazilian footballer
- Janne Kolling, Danish handball player
- Johannes Kolling, Dutch fencer
- Johannes Kölling (born 1984), German politician
- Michael Kölling, Kent University lecturer

== See also ==
- Bolling (disambiguation)
- Kolling Institute of Medical Research
