= Bol (surname) =

Bol is a surname in the Low Countries and in South Sudan.

== Dutch surname ==
Bol (Dutch pronunciation: [bɔl]) is a Dutch surname with a variety of origins. These can be patronymic (after Bolle/Bole short forms of the Germanic personal name Baldo), occupational (bol = bread roll, referring to a baker), and descriptive (someone with a bol hoofd = round/bald head).

=== People named Bol ===
People with this surname Bol include:

- Cees Bol (born 1995), Dutch cyclist
- Cornelis Bol/Boel (c. 1575 – after 1621), Flemish draughtsman and engraver
- Cornelis Bol (1589–1666), Flemish painter
- Femke Broeders-Bol (born 2000), Dutch track and field athlete
- Ferdinand Bol (1616–1680), Dutch painter, etcher, and draftsman
- Gerrit Bol (1906–1989), Dutch mathematician
- Hans Bol (1534–1593), Flemish painter in the Northern Mannerist style
- Henri Bol (1945–2000), Dutch still life painter
- Jan Bol (1924–2010), Dutch Olympic sailor
- Jetse Bol (born 1989), Dutch road bicycle racer
- Kees Bol (1916–2009), Dutch painter and art educator
- Laurens J. Bol (1898–1994), Dutch art historian specialized in 17th-century painters
- Peter Bol (historian) (born 1948), American historian and sinologist
- Todd Bol (1956–2018), American public bookcase maker

== South Sudanese surname ==
- Abraham Makoi Bol, governor of Western Lakes State, South Sudan
- Bol Bol (born 1999), Sudanese-born American basketball player; son of Manute Bol
- Francis Piol Bol Bok (born 1979), Dinka tribesman, abolitionist and author living in the United States
- Grace Bol (born 1990), South Sudanese fashion model
- Kerubino Kuanyin Bol (1948–1999), a leader of the Sudan People's Liberation Army
- Manute Bol (1962–2010), Sudanese-born American basketball player and political activist
- Peter Bol (runner) (born 1994), Australian middle-distance runner
- Peter Bol Koang, governor of Eastern Bieh, South Sudan
- Samuel Aru Bol (1929–2000), prominent politician who signed the Khartoum Peace Agreement of 1997

== See also ==
- Boll (surname)
- Bols (surname)
- Bowles (surname)
