= Museum on the Move =

Louisiana museum exhibit in an Airstream trailer

Museum on the Move is a mobile museum exhibit built in a 1954 Airstream trailer by graduate students at the University of Louisiana at Lafayette as part of the effort to teach public history.

The university acquired the vintage trailer in February 2013 and it was converted into a tool for mobile storytelling in partnership with the university's School of Architecture and Design.

Before the semester starts, students meet plan the focus for the next term, including any necessary research. Exhibits in 2013, 2016, 2018 and 2019 focused on women, Mardi Gras, Hurricane Harvey and the oil industry in Louisiana.
