= Wally Byam =

American inventor (1896–1962)

Wallace Merle "Wally" Byam (1896–1962) was an American inventor, engineer, developer and entrepreneur most famous as one of the pioneer manufacturers of the travel trailer. He founded the company, Airstream Inc. From the 1930s until his death in 1962, Byam was a leader in developing both a romance and enthusiasm associated with the automobile and recreational vehicle culture, as well as product features as the United States became increasingly focused on highways and automobile travel.

== Early years ==
Byam was born on July 4, 1896, in Baker City, Oregon and as a young child he traveled extensively with his grandfather, who led a mule train in Oregon. By the time he was three, his parents divorced and his mother married David Davis, a butcher. By 1910, the family had moved to Astoria, OR and Byam had taken the name of his stepfather, Davis. Later, as an adolescent, Byam worked as a shepherd while he lived in a two-wheeled shepherd's cart outfitted with a kerosene cook stove, a sleeping bag, and wash pail. In these early years, he also joined tugboats as an ablebodied seaman during summers on Astoria to Alaska trips which fostered his independence and love of travel.

By the time Byam ended high school both his mother and stepfather had died leaving him orphaned and with not much money he turned to college. In 1921, he graduated with a BA in history, registered under the name Wallace M. Davis at Stanford University. After graduating he traveled to Hollywood attempting a career but started a job at The Los Angeles Times. He married his first wife, Marion James, with whom he owned an advertisement mailer company. A do-it-yourself magazine he published featured an article describing how to build a travel trailer. When readers complained about the plans, Byam tried them out for himself. Indeed, he discovered the plans were flawed.

Byam was inspired to build his own travel trailer, to accompany a model T. Byam and his wife went on a camping trip in the teardrop model type pop up "tent". Byam wrote an article in Popular Mechanics describing how to build his trailer for under $100 — this time drawing an enthusiastic response from his readers.

== Byam sells leisure travel ==
During the late 1920s, Americans were beginning to take to the roads in greater numbers. Byam's new trailer was a perfect match for the increasingly popular mobile lifestyle. Byam thus began selling sets of his plans for five dollars. He also sold complete trailer kits and finished trailers he built in his Los Angeles backyard. His fledgling business survived the crash of 1929. By 1930, he had abandoned advertising and publishing to become a full-time builder of Masonite travel trailers. The Airstream Company was incorporated in 1931.

In 1934, Hawley Bowlus developed the first riveted aluminum trailer, named the "Road Chief". Wally Byam was involved in sales of these trailers. Bowlus continued to produce his line of trailers, finally ending production in September 1936. William Hawley Bowlus was an aircraft designer who had worked on The Spirit of St. Louis.

== Airstream and World War II ==
On January 17, 1936, the Airstream Trailer Co. introduced the Clipper, and a well-known American brand was born. The Clipper was a similar shape and length to the Bowlus Road Chief but with the door now located on the side. With its semi monocoque, riveted aluminum body, it had more in common with the aircraft of its day than with its travel trailer predecessors. It could sleep four, thanks to its tubular steel-framed dinette, which could convert to a bed. It carried its own water supply, had an enclosed galley, and was fitted with electric lights. The Clipper boasted advanced insulation and a ventilation system, and even offered "air conditioning" that used dry ice.

At $1200, the Clipper was considered an expensive travel trailer. However, market response to the product was strong and Byam's company could not build units fast enough to satisfy the deluge of orders.

Wally Byam's meticulous attention to quality and design helped guide the firm through tough economic times. Of more than 400 travel trailer builders operating in 1936, Airstream was the only one to survive the Great Depression years.

With the onset of World War II, leisure travel and the materials necessary to build trailers became luxuries the country could not afford and in response to the war effort, Airstream Trailer Co. closed its doors. Byam decided that the best way to help America was to use his experience with aluminum fabricating in the aircraft industry. He took positions at Lockheed and Curtis Wright for the duration of the war.

When World War II ended, the economy boomed and Americans once again turned their attention towards recreational travel. Byam reopened Airstream; by 1948, the demand for Airstream trailers seemed limitless. Like the Coca-Cola bottle and Zippo lighter, Airstream travel trailers became one of the most recognizable products in the world.

== The 1950s ==
In July 1952, the lease was signed for a facility in Jackson Center, Ohio, to serve the eastern market. By August 1954, the first Ohio-made Airstream rolled off the production line, and the California factory was moved to larger facilities in Santa Fe Springs. Wally Byam was one of the first to attempt this sort of travel on a global scale.

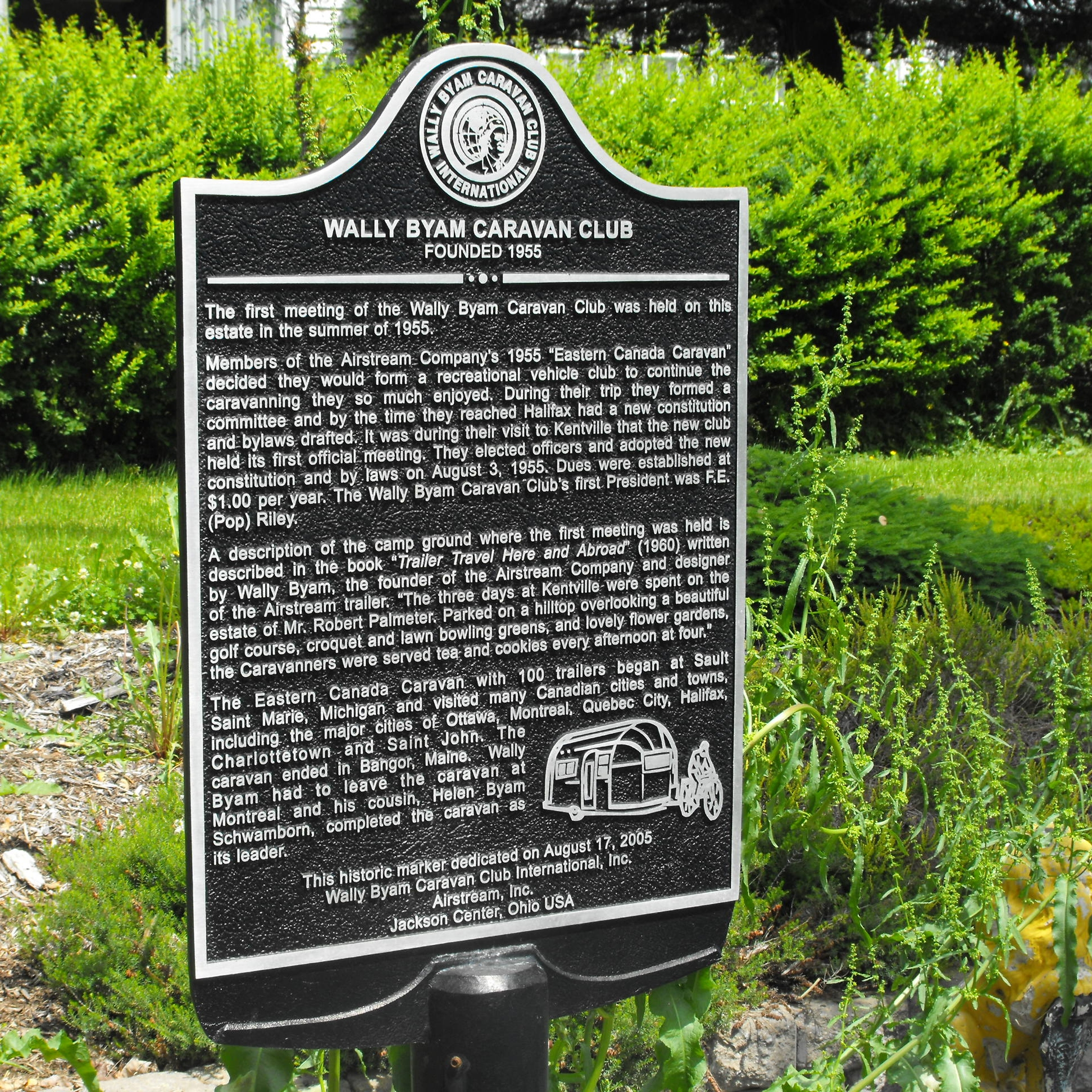
1955 marker of the Wally Byam Caravan Club shows Alfred Letourneur towing a 1947 airstream trailer.

In 1955, Wally travelled to Europe with his wife Stella, in a one-of-a-kind Airstream Bubble to scout the 1956 caravan. Then in 1956, he travelled to Europe in a white 26' trailer towed by a Cadillac. Byam's globetrotting adventures were the inspiration for the formation of the nonprofit club, Wally Byam Caravan Club International, to promote the use of Airstreams to travel as much as possible. Founded in Kentville, Nova Scotia, Canada, in 1955, the club is still in existence today, with more than 6,000 member families. In 2007, the club held more than 1400 rallies and caravans.

== Wally Byam Death ==
On July 22, 1962, Wally Byam died at the age of 66 of a brain tumor. He is interred at Forest Lawn Memorial Park in Glendale, CA in the Columbarium Garden of Honor.

== Caravans ==
Byam famously led caravans worldwide as publicity exercises for the Airstream brand. The Wally Byam Caravan Club's 50th International Rally took place in Perry, GA June 23-July 4, 2007. His most notable caravan was a 1959 excursion from Cape Town, South Africa, to Nairobi, Kenya. A recreation of Byam's legendary Cape Town to Nairobi caravan was scheduled to take place in 2009. However, the planned tour was canceled due to safety and political concerns, and the prohibitive insurance costs.
