= Bowlus =

Travel trailer

Bowlus is an American luxury travel trailer with a front door, aerodynamic shape and polished aluminum body.

Hawley Bowlus designed and built the travel trailer using his knowledge of aircraft construction. Aspects of the design were used on the first aluminum-body Airstream trailers, the Airstream Clipper. Bowlus stopped producing the trailers in 1936.

Production of a modernized, enlarged travel trailer resumed in 2013 in Oxnard, California.

== History ==
=== Founding and early years ===
The first Bowlus was designed and built by Hawley Bowlus in 1934. Bowlus was a designer, aerospace engineer and the builder of the Spirit of St. Louis aircraft. From 1934 to 1936, over eighty Bowlus were built at Bowlus’ family ranch in San Fernando, California.

In 1936, Wally Byam who founded Airstream adapted the design for the Airstream Clipper after selling Bowlus trailers.

In November 1936, Bowlus stopped building travel trailers and did not transfer assets to another party.

Approximately half of the original Bowlus travel trailers have survived. In a Scottsdale Gooding & Company auction, a vintage Bowlus Road Chief sold for $187,000.

=== Modern Era ===
Bowlus was revived by Geneva Long and her family in 2014. The modern travel trailers are longer, wider and taller than the originals and are lightweight. Gross vehicle weight ratings are between 3,500 lb. and 4,000 lb. depending on the model. The Endless Highways model is described as being the most advanced travel trailer in the world.

The modern-era company is headquartered in Oxnard, California. Bowlus trailers are built with riveted aluminum monocoque shells, a construction method derived from aircraft manufacturing. Each travel trailer is made with birch wood, 2024 T3 aluminum and stainless steel countertops. The company manufactures several versions of the trailer, including the Endless Highways and Rivets.

Bowlus released the first all-electric RV in 2022 and became the first all-electric RV company in 2023.

== Technology and features ==
The Bowlus was the first travel trailer to have heated floors in 2014. The aluminum monocoque construction, polyiso insulation and hydronic heating system allows full operation in freezing temperatures and all seasons.

The Bowlus was the first travel trailer to use lithium iron phosphate (LiFePO_{4}) batteries and as of 2025, it comes with a battery systems of 4 kWh to 17 kWh. Bowlus travel trailers can run for weeks without hookups using solar absorption. Full operation is possible from the batteries alone, including air conditioning.

Bowlus was the first travel trailer to include self-propulsion, a feature branded AeroMove.

== Appearances ==
A Bowlus Road Chief appeared in the 1935 Hollywood movie Red Salute.

In 2016, Bowlus partnered with Bentley for the launch of the Bentley Bentayga during Monterey Car Week.

In 2017, a Bowlus Endless Highways appeared in a Squarespace commercial that was part of a Super Bowl Advertising Campaign with Keanu Reeves.

In 2020, Neiman Marcus’s annual Fantasy Gifts holiday catalog featured a custom single unit of Bowlus Endless Highways Performance Edition travel trailer as its marquee gift.
