= Bowles =

Bowles may refer to:

== Places ==
- Bowles, California, census-designated place in California, United States
- Bowles Rocks, sandstone crag in the county of East Sussex in South East England
- Cape Bowles, South Shetland Islands, Antarctica
- Mount Bowles, South Shetland Islands, Antarctica

== Other ==
- Bowles (surname)
- Bowles Hall, male residence dormitory at the University of California, Berkeley
- Bowles v. Russell, 2007 U.S. Supreme Court case

== See also ==
- Bols (disambiguation)
- Bowes (disambiguation)
- Bowlus (disambiguation)
