= AutoCamp =

American hotel company

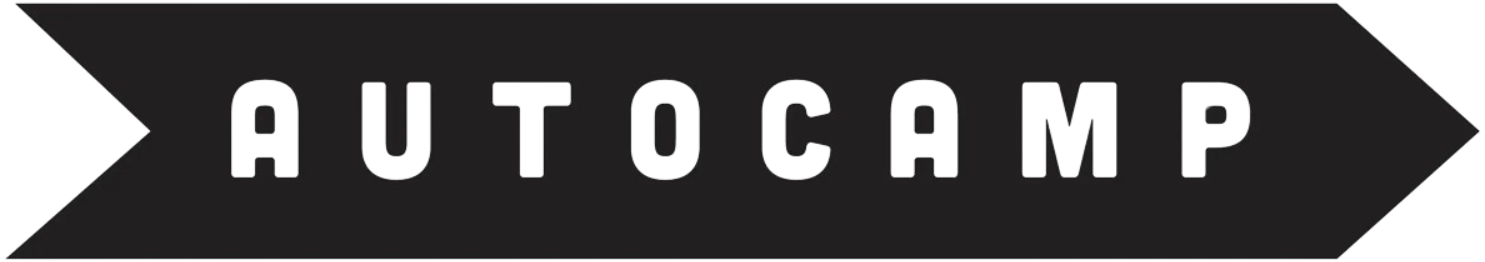

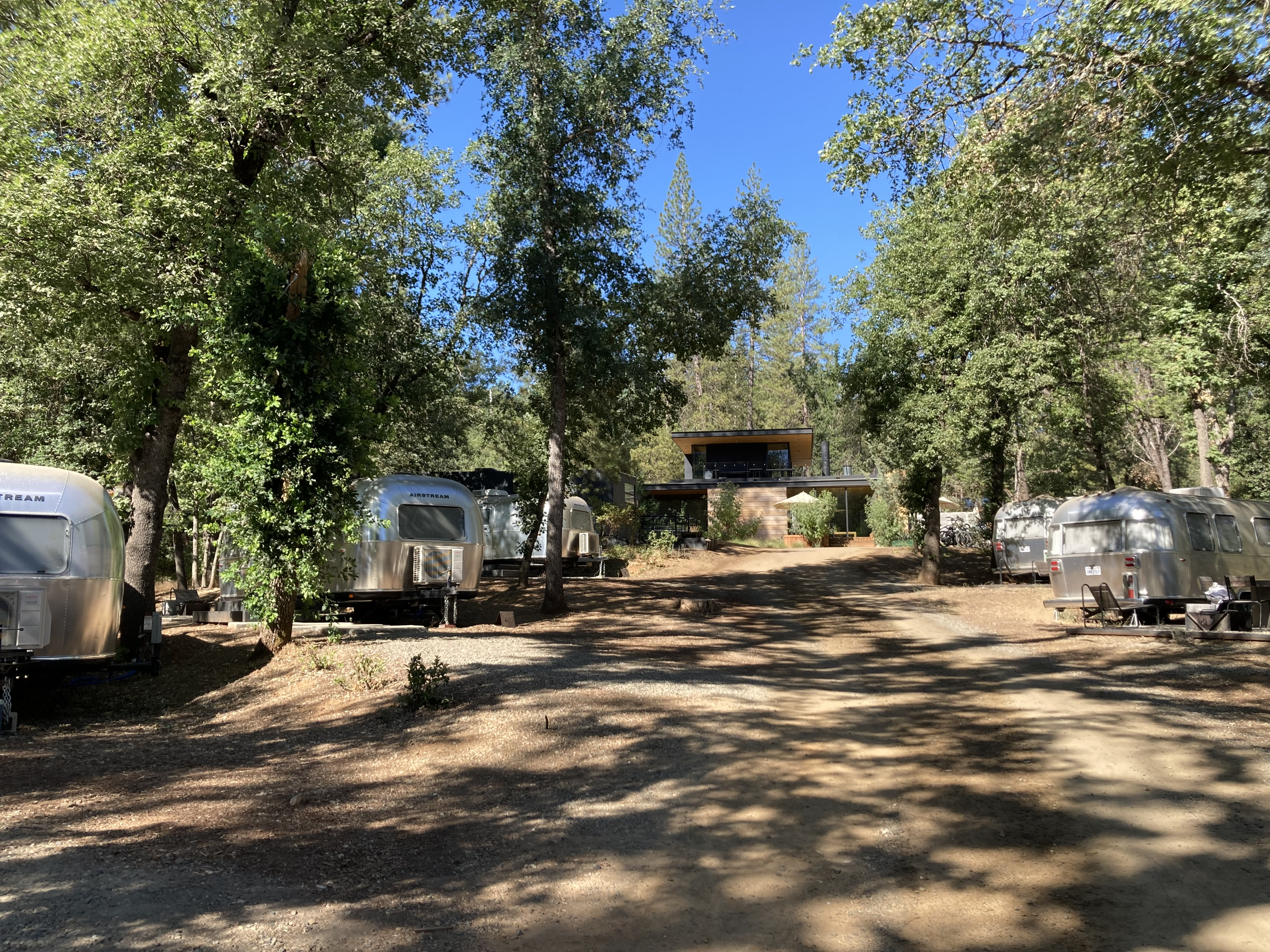
- AutoCamp Yosemite in 2023, facing toward the clubhouse
- Type: Private
- Industry: Hotel
- Founded: 2012; 14 years ago
- Founder: Neil Dipaola; Ryan Miller
- Number of locations: 6 (3 upcoming) (2023)
- Area served: California; Massachusetts; New York; Utah
- Key people: Neil Dipaola (CEO); David DiFalco (COO); Katie Hara (CPO); Bryan Terzi (CMO)
- Owner: Neil Dipaola
- Website: autocamp.com

AutoCamp is a hotel company that allows customers to rent Airstream trailers to glamp near popular recreational areas, such as national parks. It has six locations in California, Massachusetts, New York, and Utah. AutoCamp Yosemite was listed by Time magazine as one of the "World's Greatest Places" in 2019. AutoCamps are known for their luxury aspect, sometimes costing over $500 per night for a normal trailer. It is in a partnership with the Airstream company itself.

== History ==
AutoCamp was founded by Neil Dipaola to provide more accessibility between humans and nature. The company's first location, in Santa Barbara, California, opened in 2013, with the initial purchase of an RV park happening in 2012. The now-closed area held six Airstreams with the idea of offering affordable housing. The ideology changed, however, and it became a hotel, as this was during the start of Airbnb and many tourists were recently discovering vacation rentals. In December 2018, Dipaola was called by the CEO of Airstream, Bob Wheeler, who wanted to work with him due to the publicity the camp was getting. Airstream became an investor and partner of the company, being its exclusive lodging/hotel partner.

The second location near Russian River in California was opened in 2016, inside of a redwood grove. The Yosemite National Park location opened in June 2019.

The business boosted during the COVID-19 pandemic due to the interest in outdoor travel and wellness-focused vacations.

AutoCamp's first East Coast location was established in April 2021 in Cape Cod, Massachusetts. A Joshua Tree National Park camp also was created in December of that year. The first New York location was established in June 2022. Likewise, the first camp in Utah opened in May 2023, in Zion National Park.

There are three upcoming locations, in or near Asheville, North Carolina, the Texas Hill Country, and Sequoia National Park.

== Features ==
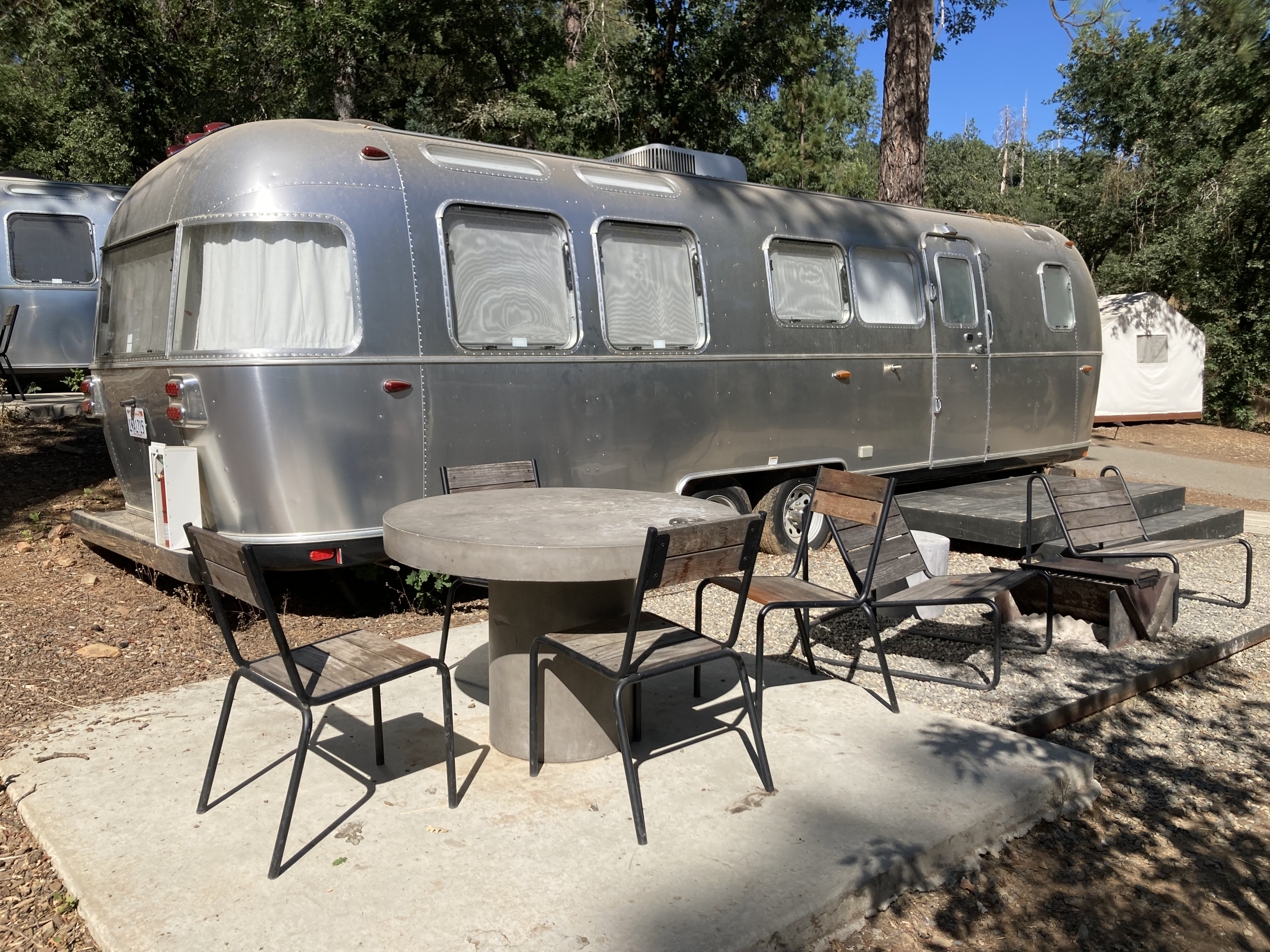
An Airstream at the Yosemite location

The company's founder, Neil Dipaola, said in 2019 that AutoCamps cost 30–40% less to construct than conventional hotels.

Most AutoCamps have a clubhouse with mid-century modern architecture, along with a shared fire pit. The clubhouse is a communal center of sorts, being a combination of help desk, lobby, restaurant, and general store. In the Joshua Tree location, it is a twin Quonset hut, switching up the design.

In addition to its signature Airstreams, the company also offers tents with furnishings. The camp also provides free WiFi in their lodging, a grill and fire pit, showers, and cookware. Bikes are a complementary rental, and wagons are provided for hauling luggage. Dogs are permitted, at a $75 fee each, with a maximum of two.

There are three types of Airstream suites: Classic, which are near the front and are closer together, Premium, which are in the back and spaced out, and Visa, which are located in the far back.

== Locations ==
Name	Nearest settlement	State	# of spots	Size	Coordinates
AutoCamp Santa Barbara (Note: This location has closed.)	Santa Barbara	California	26	2.48 acres (1.00 ha)	34.4355°N 119.7261°W
AutoCamp Cape Cod	Falmouth	Massachusetts	108	14 acres (5.7 ha)	41.5775°N 70.6299°W
AutoCamp Yosemite	Midpines	California	98	35 acres (14 ha)	37.5437°N 119.9209°W
AutoCamp Russian River	Guerneville	California	34	3 acres (1.2 ha)	38.4967°N 123.0090°W
AutoCamp Catskills	Saugerties	New York	85	37 acres (15 ha)	42.0835°N 74.0159°W
AutoCamp Joshua Tree	Joshua Tree	California	47	25 acres (10 ha)	34.1386°N 116.3061°W
AutoCamp Zion	Virgin	Utah	96	16 acres (6.5 ha)	37.1962°N 113.1645°W
