= Bowes (disambiguation) =

Bowes is a village in County Durham, England.

Bowes may also refer to:

== People ==
- Bowes (surname), a surname

== Places ==
- Bowes, Western Australia
- Bowes (ward), electoral ward in London, UK
- Bowes, Illinois, unincorporated community in Plato Township, Kane County, Illinois, United States
- Bowes, West Virginia, unincorporated community in Greenbrier County, West Virginia, United States

== Other uses ==
- Bowes Primary School, a primary school in London
- Bowes Railway, the world's only preserved operational standard gauge cable railway system
- Bowes railway station, a North East England railway station
- Bowes Station, a pastoral lease in Western Australia

== See also ==
- Bowe
- Bowes & Bowes
- Bowes Castle
- Bowes Museum
- Bowes Park, Greater London
- Bowes-Lyon
- Bow (disambiguation)
- Bowles (disambiguation)
