= Spoolsville, Maryland =

Unincorporated community in Maryland, U.S.

Coordinates: 39°27′00″N 77°33′41″W

Spoolsville is an unincorporated community in Frederick County, Maryland, United States. Bowlus Mill House was listed on the National Register of Historic Places in 1996.
