= Madeleine Boll =

Swiss footballer (born 1953)

Personal information
- Date of birth: 8 July 1953 (age 73)
- Place of birth: Valais, Switzerland
- Position: Midfielder

Youth career
- Sion

Senior career*
| Years | Team | Apps | (Gls) |
| 1970 | Gommagomma | | |
| 1971 | Real Juventus | | |
| 1972 | Falchi Crescentinese | | |
| 1973–1974 | Falchi Astro | | |
| 1975–1977 | Sion | | |

International career
| 1972–1978 | Switzerland | 16 | (9) |
- * Club domestic league appearances and goals

Madeleine Boll (born 8 July 1953) is a Swiss former footballer who played as a midfielder for Sion. She represented the Switzerland national team.

== Biography ==
Boll interest in football began in an early age. She joined FC Sion's youth team at the age of 12. In 1965, she took part in a match between Sion and Turkish club Galatasaray in the European Cup Winners' Cup. The media coverage of the match resulted in Boll having her licence to play football in Switzerland withdrawn since the Swiss Football Association did not realize Boll was female.

At the age of 17, Boll took the opportunity to play in professional football in Italy where she played for five years, she first signed with Gommagomma. Her performances in Serie A gained her the nickname "Montagna blonda" ("The Blond Mountain"). In 1975, Boll returned to Switzerland to play for the FC Sion, winning the Swiss Women's Cup in 1977. Boll during her playing days was nicknamed the White Pelé.

== International career ==
Madeleine Boll represented Switzerland 16 times and scored 9 times.

== Honours ==
Gommagomma

- Serie A: 1970, 1971

Real Juventus

- Serie A: 1971

Falchi Astro

- Coppa Italia: 1973

Sion

- Swiss Cup: 1976, 1977
