= Bol, Mazandaran =

Bol بل
- Village
- Location within Iran
- Coordinates: 36°11′49″N 51°46′34″E
- Country: Iran
- Province: Mazandaran
- County: Nur
- Bakhsh: Baladeh
- Rural District: Sheykh Fazlolah-e Nuri

Population (2006)
  - Total: 48
- Time zone: UTC+3:30 (IRST)
  - Summer (DST): UTC+4:30 (IRDT)

Bol (Persian: بل) is a village in Sheykh Fazlolah-e Nuri Rural District, Baladeh District, Nur County, Mazandaran Province, Iran. At the 2006 census, its population was 48, in 17 families.
