= Phillip S. Bolling =

African-American brick mason and politician

- Born: Circa 1849; Buckingham County, Virginia
- Died: April 18, 1892; Petersburg, Virginia
- Occupations: Politician, brick mason
- Spouse: Harriet T. Jackson
- Parent(s): Samuel P. Bolling, Ellen Bolling

Phillip S. Bolling (c. 1849 – April 18, 1892) was an African-American brick mason and politician. In 2013 Bolling, along with his father Samuel P. Bolling, was one of several African Americans who were commemorated by the Commonwealth of Virginia for their service to the Virginia House of Delegates during the time period of 1869 to 1890.

Bolling was born into slavery around 1849 to Samuel P. and Ellen Bolling. Along with the rest of his family, Bolling moved to Cumberland County, Virginia after the American Civil War. During this time he worked on his father's farm land and as a brick mason in his father's brickyard.

He ran for the House of Delegates in 1883 as a member of the Readjuster Party, but his eligibility was challenged by the Democratic Party, who alleged that he was a resident of Prince Edward County, Virginia and thus not able to represent the counties of Buckingham and Cumberland. Despite this, Bolling managed to win the election and was appointed to the Committees on Banks, Currency, and Commerce, on Officers and Offices at the Capitol, and on Rules. This did not stand well with the Democratic Party, who again challenged Bolling's eligibility despite there being a large amount of evidence that suggested otherwise. This time the Democrats were successful and Bolling was removed from his chair in early 1884. Bolling's father successfully ran for his son's position the following year.

After being removed from office Bolling married Harriet T. Jackson on March 31, 1887, and served on the Prince Edward County board of supervisors. In March 1892 Bolling was admitted to the Central Lunatic Asylum in Petersburg, where he died on April 18, 1892, from tuberculosis.

== See also ==
- African American officeholders from the end of the Civil War until before 1900
