= Bol, Chabahar =

Bol بل
- Village
- Location within Iran
- Coordinates: 25°27′06″N 61°23′02″E
- Country: Iran
- Province: Sistan and Baluchestan
- County: Chabahar
- Bakhsh: Dashtiari
- Rural District: Sand-e Mir Suiyan

Population (2006)
  - Total: 184
- Time zone: UTC+3:30 (IRST)
  - Summer (DST): UTC+4:30 (IRDT)

Bol (Persian: بل; also known as Rīmdān-e Shāh Valī Moḩammad and Rīmdān Shāh Wali Muhammad) is a village in Sand-e Mir Suiyan Rural District, Dashtiari District, Chabahar County, Sistan and Baluchestan Province, Iran. At the 2006 census, its population was 184, in 36 families.
