= Pol Boël =

Belgian industrialist and liberal politician

- Born: 11 May 1923; Brussels, Belgium
- Died: 19 July 2007 (aged 84)
- Occupations: industrialist, politician

Count Pol Boël (11 May 1923 – 19 July 2007) was a Belgian industrialist and liberal politician. He was a son of René Boël (1899–1990) and Yvonne Solvay (1896–1930). Pol Boël was married with Nicole Davignon, a sister of Étienne Davignon and together they have two children, Yvonne and Nicolas.

== Sources ==
- Belgian Senate, Biografisch Handboek, Brussel, 1987, pp. 53–54.
- Ysebaert, Clair, Politicowie. Politiek Zakboekje 1992, Zaventem, Kluwer Editorial, pp. 17–18.
