= Bowes, West Virginia =

Unincorporated community in West Virginia, United States

- Unincorporated community
- Location within West Virginia Location within the United States
- Coordinates: 37°50′28″N 80°22′27″W
- Country: United States
- State: West Virginia
- County: Greenbrier
- Elevation: 1,742 ft (531 m)
- Time zone: UTC-5 (Eastern (EST))
  - Summer (DST): UTC-4 (EDT)
- Area codes: 304 & 681
- GNIS feature ID: 1553956

Bowes is an unincorporated community in Greenbrier County, West Virginia, United States. Bowes is 5 miles (8.0 km) northeast of Lewisburg.
