= John Bowes (cricketer) =

English cricketer

Personal information
- Full name: John Barton Bowes
- Born: 2 January 1918; Stretford, Lancashire, England
- Died: 22 May 1969 (aged 51); Manchester, England
- Bowling: Right-arm medium
- Role: Bowler

Domestic team information
- Years: Team
- 1938–1948: Lancashire
- FC debut: 6 July 1938 Lancashire v Northamptonshire
- Last FC: 14 May 1948 Lancashire v Warwickshire

Career statistics
Competition	First-class
Matches	10
Runs scored	106
Batting average	8.83
100s/50s	0/0
Top score	39
Balls bowled	1,463
Wickets	20
Bowling average	30.10
5 wickets in innings	0
10 wickets in match	0
Best bowling	4/103
Catches/stumpings	7/–
- Source: CricketArchive, 21 May 2012

John Barton Bowes (2 January 1918 – 22 May 1969) was an English cricketer who played first-class cricket for Lancashire in 10 matches between 1938 and 1948. He was born in Stretford, Manchester and died in Manchester too.

Bowes was a tail-end batsman and a right-arm medium-paced seam bowler. His single first-class game before the Second World War came in 1938 against Northamptonshire, and Wisden Cricketers' Almanack noted that he "used his exceptional height for making the ball lift and when seven Lancashire batsmen were out for 49 he hit so well that 67 runs were added". In the match he took only one wicket but the 39 he made in his only innings of the game would prove to be his highest first-class score.

Bowes returned to Lancashire after the war and played regularly in 1947: most of his games were for the second eleven in the Minor Counties Championship, but in August he had a run of seven matches in the first team. His best bowling came in the game against the South Africans, when he took four wickets for 103 runs in 41 overs, all of them top-order batsmen. After a single match in 1948 he did not play for Lancashire again.

Bowes qualified as an umpire and stood in Minor Counties matches from 1955 and then in first-class domestic matches in England in 1958 and 1959.
