= Yves Boël =

Belgian businessman (1927-2012)

- Born: Yves Max Robert Marie Ghislain; 12 September 1927; Brussels
- Died: 19 June 2012 (aged 84)
- Occupation: businessman

Yves Boël (12 September 1927, Brussels – 19 June 2012) was a Belgian businessman. He was a son of count René Boël and Yvonne Solvay, granddaughter of Ernest Solvay and he married countess Yolande d'Oultremont on 12 September 1977.

Yves Boël was president of the board of Sofina. With an estimated fortune of 1.418 billion euro, he was one of the wealthiest people in Belgium.
