= Lou Bols =

Australian rules footballer (1905–1957)

Personal information
- Full name: Louis Edward Bols
- Born: 29 July 1905; Perth, Western Australia
- Died: 2 October 1957 (aged 52); St Kilda, Victoria
- Height: 170 cm (5 ft 7 in)
- Weight: 77 kg (170 lb)

Playing career^{1}
Years	Club	Games (Goals)
1927–28, 1930	Fitzroy	27 (4)
- ^{1} Playing statistics correct to the end of 1930.

Louis Edward Bols (29 July 1905 – 2 October 1957) was an Australian rules footballer who played with Fitzroy in the Victorian Football League (VFL).

== Coach ==
In 1932 he was the coach of the Old Scotch Football Club team that won the VAFA's A Section premiership, defeating State Savings Bank 13.18 (96) to 10.8 (68) on 17 September 1932.

He was appointed coach of the State Savings Bank VAFA team in the following season (1933).

== Death ==
He died at his residence in St Kilda, Victoria on 2 October 1957.
