= Boll (surname) =

Boll or Böll is a German, Danish & English surname. Notable people with the surname include:

- Buzz Boll (1911–1990), Canadian ice hockey player
- Don Boll (1927–2001), American football player
- Ernst Boll (1817–1868), German naturalist and historian
- Fabian Boll (born 1979), German football player
- Franz Boll (philologist) (1867–1924), German historian of astrology
- Franz Boll (historian) (1805–1875), theologian and historian
- Franz Christian Boll (1849–1879), discoverer of rhodopsin
- Greg Boll (born 1960), American politician
- Heinrich Böll (1917–1985), German novelist (Nobel Prize Literature 1972)
- Jacob Boll (1828–1880), Swiss naturalist and entomologist
- Jared Boll (born 1986), American ice hockey player
- Madeleine Boll (born 1953), Swiss footballer
- Monika Boll (born 1971), German footballer
- Robert Henry Boll (1875–1956), preacher in the Churches of Christ
- Timo Boll (born 1981), German table tennis player
- Uwe Boll (born 1965), German movie director

== See also ==
- Bol (surname)
- Bowles (surname)
