= Bodil Boserup =

Danish politician (1921–1995)

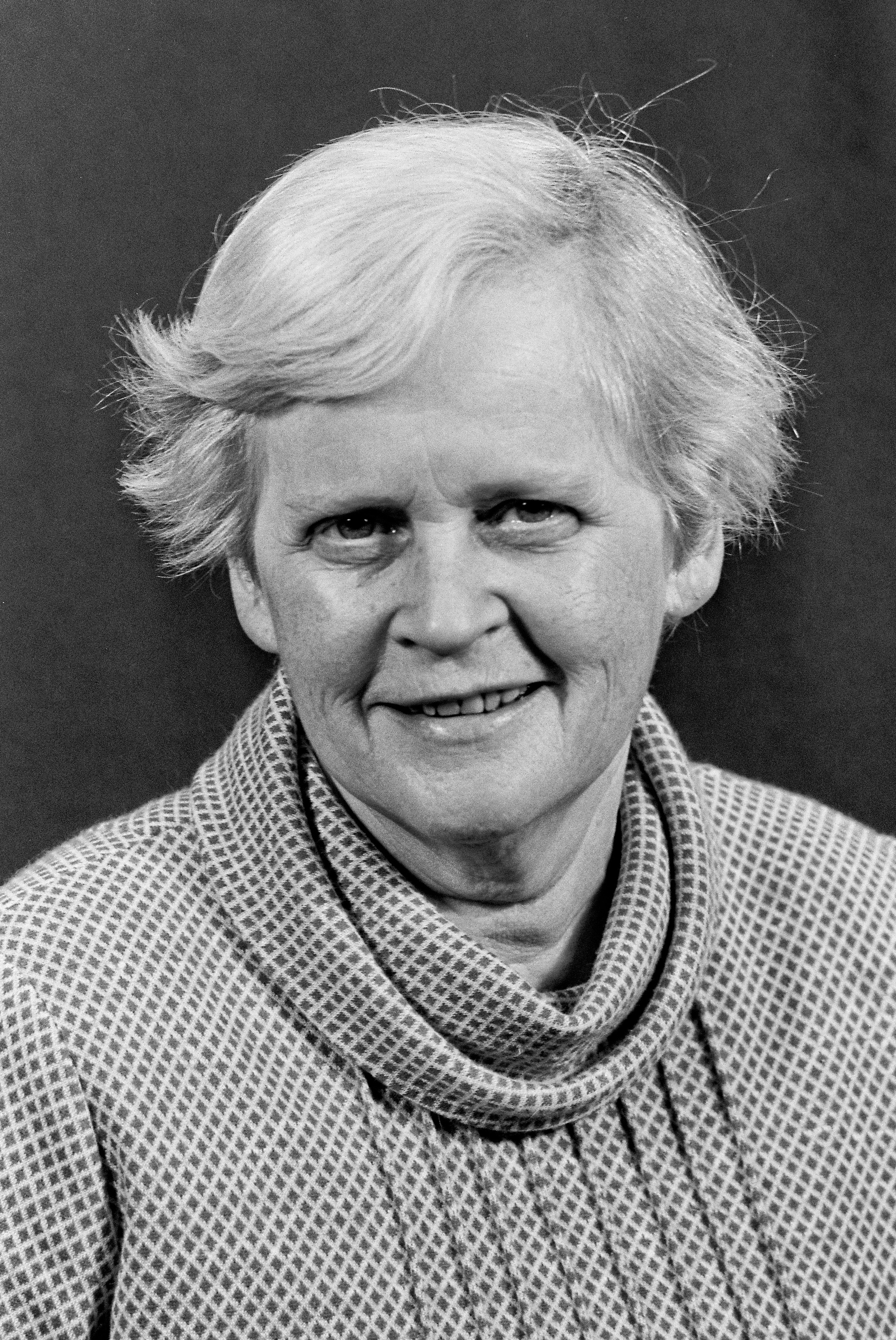

Personal details
- Born: 24 June 1921 Thisted, Denmark
- Died: 23 February 1995 (aged 73)
- Party: Socialist People's Party

Bodil Boserup (1921–1995) was a Danish socialist politician. She was a member of the Socialist People's Party and served at both the Danish Parliament and the European Parliament.

== Biography ==
She was born in Thisted on 24 June 1921.

Boserup was a member of the Socialist People's Party. She served as the municipal councillor for Copenhagen. She was first elected to the Danish Parliament in 1977, and her tenure lasted until 1979.

Boserup was elected to the European Parliament on 17 July 1979 part of the Communist and Allies Group. She was the treasurer of the group and served at the Parliament until 23 July 1984. She was reelected to the European Parliament again for the Communist and Allies Group on 24 July 1984. She again served as the treasurer of the group, and her term ended on 24 July 1989.

Boserup died on 23 February 1995.
