= Hawley Bowlus =

American designer of aircraft and recreational vehicles

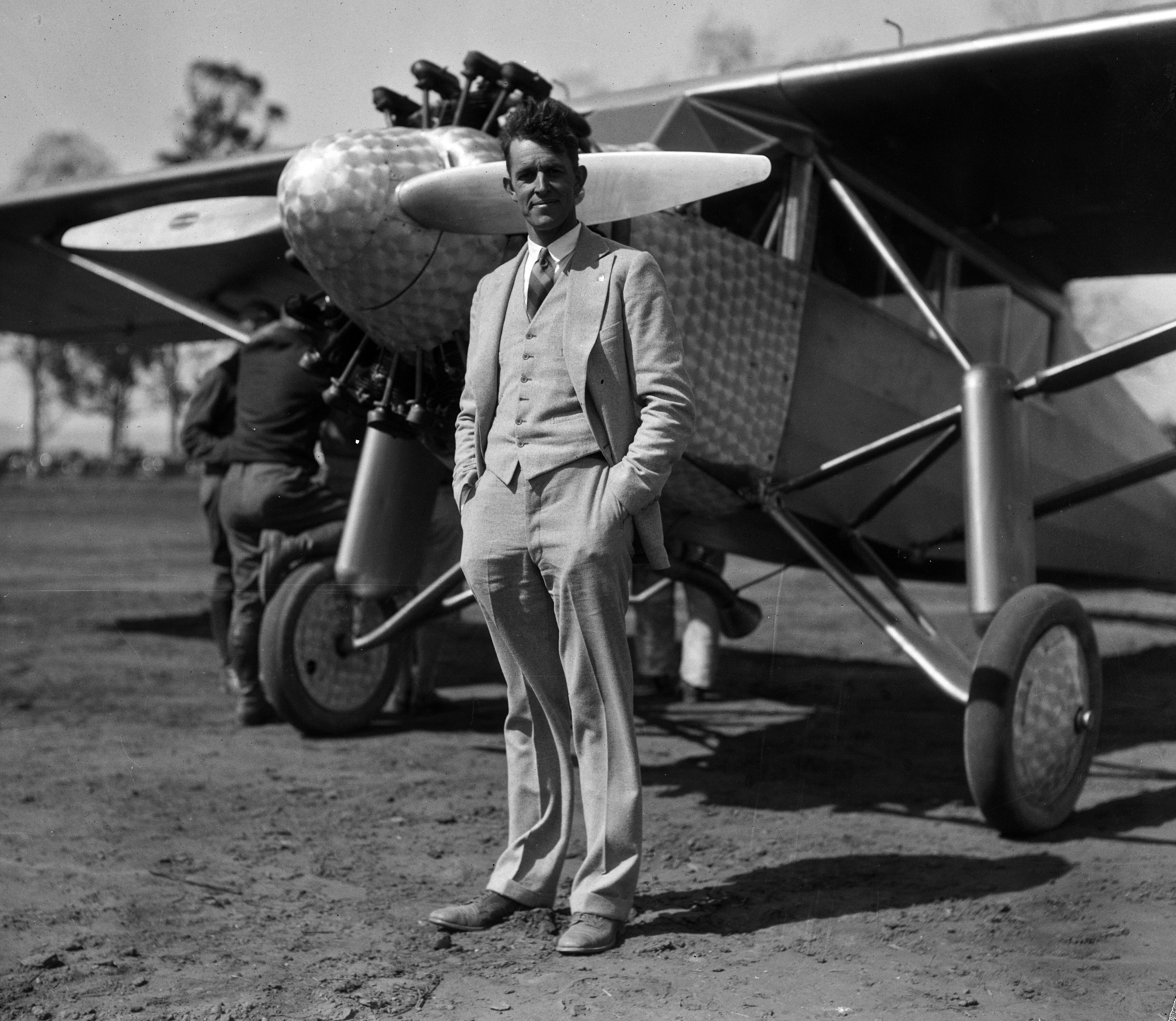
Hawley Bowlus

William Hawley Bowlus (May 8, 1896 – August 27, 1967) was an American designer, engineer and builder of aircraft (especially gliders) and recreational vehicles in the 1930s and 1940s. Today he is most widely known for his creation of the world's first aluminum travel trailer, the Bowlus Road Chief, which Airstream imitated in 1936 to create the Clipper. This followed his prior famed work as the Superintendent of Construction on Charles Lindbergh's aircraft, the Spirit of St. Louis. He also designed and constructed the innovative but unsuccessful XCG-16A experimental military glider ordered by the U.S. Army Air Corps in 1943, appearing as XCG-16 in the list of Vincent Burnelli airplanes. In popular culture he is usually referred to as Hawley Bowlus.

Bowlus was an expert at soaring flight and at building gliders, established numerous records, trained many of America's earliest glider pilots, and gave gliding lessons to both Charles and Anne Morrow Lindbergh. In 1930 he and Lindbergh glided at various locations in California. Most notably Point Loma in San Diego California where Bowlus conducted many of his flights and tests.

Charles Lindbergh established a regional distance record for gliders by flying in a Bowlus sailplane from Mount Soledad in La Jolla to Del Mar, making use of the lift at Torrey Pines Gliderport. Anne Morrow Lindbergh also flew in a Bowlus sailplane from Mount Soledad and became the first woman in the United States to receive a "first class" glider license (Maxine Dunlap had preceded her in becoming the first woman in the United States to receive a glider license of any kind, a "third class" glider license). Bowlus was also the first American to break Orville Wright's 1911 soaring duration record in an American designed and built sailplane.

Bowlus was inducted into the Soaring Hall of Fame in 1954.

== See also ==
- Bowlus SP-1 Paperwing
