= Samuel M. Bolling =

American politician

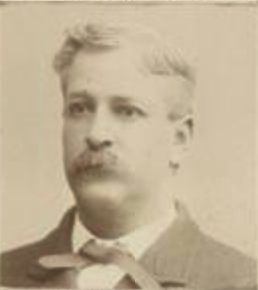

Member of the Virginia House of Delegates from Bedford County
- In office December 2, 1891 – December 4, 1895

Personal details
- Born: Samuel Mordecai Bolling; December 29, 1846 Petersburg, Virginia, U.S.
- Died: July 31, 1927 (aged 80) Bedford, Virginia, U.S.
- Party: Democratic
- Spouse(s): Elizabeth Holcombe; Bessie Clarke

Military service
- Allegiance: Confederate States
- Branch/service: Confederate States Army
- Battles/wars: American Civil War

Samuel Mordecai Bolling (December 29, 1846 – July 31, 1927) was an American politician who served in the Virginia House of Delegates from 1891 to 1894.

Bolling was a native of Bedford, Virginia, and represented Bedford County in the Virginia General Assembly. In 1994-1905, he was superintendent of the Virginia State Penitentiary. In December 1905, he was elected clerk of the Circuit Court of Bedford County after the death of the previous clerk had left the clerk's office closed and unable to function. He also was a member of that county's Board of Supervisors for a decade.

Bolling was married first to Elizabeth Holcombe and later to Bessie Clark, who survived him.
