= Boell =

Boell is a surname. Notable people with the surname include:

- Ed Boell (1917-1998), American football player, coach, and official
- Heinrich Boell (1890–1947), German organist and choir conductor
- William de Boell, 13th century Norman knight and administrator

== See also ==
- Sandra Boëlle (born 1961), French politician
- Boll (disambiguation)
- Boele (name)
- Boll (surname)
