= John Bowes (footballer) =

English footballer

Personal information
- Full name: John Thomas Bowes
- Date of birth: 17 January 1874
- Place of birth: Ravensworth, Yorkshire
- Date of death: 1955 (aged 81)
- Place of death: County Durham, England
- Position: Inside left

Senior career*
Years	Team	Apps	(Gls)
189?–1896	Darlington		
1896–1897	Sheffield United	4	(2)
1897–190?	Darlington		
- * Club domestic league appearances and goals

John Thomas Bowes (17 January 1874 – 1955) was an English footballer who played in the Football League as an inside left for Sheffield United in 1896–97. He also played non-league football for Darlington.

== Life and career ==
Bowes was born in 1874 in Ravensworth, which was then in the North Riding of Yorkshire. By December 1894, he was on the books of Northern League club Darlington. He helped them win the 1895–96 Northern League title as well as reach the semi-final of that season's Amateur Cup. He and team-mate Jack Almond then turned professional with Sheffield United. He made his Football League debut on 23 January 1897, in a 3–1 defeat at home to Wolverhampton Wanderers in the First Division. Brought back into the team in mid-March, he scored winning goals against Bury and Stoke, and ended the season with two goals from four appearances. Despite the positive end to his season, he was not retained, and he returned to Darlington, where he continued to play until at least the 1902–03 season. Bowes died in 1955 at the age of 81; his death was registered in the Durham Western district.
