= Bols (surname) =

Family name

Bols (Dutch pronunciation: [bɔls]) is a Dutch patronymic surname.

== People named Bols ==
People with the surname Bols include:

- Eric Bols (1904–1985), British Army officer of Belgian descent
- Jan Bols (born 1944), Dutch speed skater
- Lou Bols (1905–1957), Australian rules footballer
- Louis Bols (1867–1930), South African military officer in the British Army
- Lucas Bols (1652–1719), Dutch distiller
- Mikael Bols (born 1961), Danish organic chemist
