= Bodil Dybdal =

Danish lawyer (1901–1992)

Judge of the Supreme Court
- In office 1953–1970

Personal details
- Born: Bodil Pauline Dybdal; 20 November 1901; Copenhagen, Kingdom of Denmark
- Died: 3 June 1992 (aged 90); Copenhagen, Kingdom of Denmark

Bodil Pauline Dybdal (20 November 1901 – 3 June 1992) was a Danish lawyer. After serving as secretary of Copenhagen's municipal court, in 1933 she was appointed ministerial secretary under Karl Kristian Steincke at the Ministry of Justice. After serving as a municipal judge, in 1953 she became the first woman in Denmark to serve as a judge in the Supreme Court of Denmark, a position she maintained until she retired in 1970.

== Biography ==
Born in Copenhagen on 20 November 1901, Bodil Pauline Dybdal was the daughter of the mayor and police chief Theodor Dybdal (1856–1939) and Alma Grove Rasmussen (1871–1951). In 1970, she married the Supreme Court judge Jens Christian Andersen Herfelt (1894–1972).

After matriculating from N. Zahle's School in 1920, she studied law at the University of Copenhagen, graduating in 1926. She went on to serve as a secretary in Copenhagen's Upper Presidium where from 1930 to 1932 she was also a proxy. In 1933, she moved to the Ministry of Justice where in 1935 she became the first woman to serve as a ministerial secretary. She was also employed as the state's attorney secretary. In 1940, she became a judge for Copenhagen's municipal court and, in 1949, for the Østre Landsret, one of Denmark's two high courts. In 1953, Dybdal became the first woman to serve as a judge in the Supreme Court of Denmark, a position she maintained until she reached retirement age in 1970. She nevertheless continued to work as a member of the Permanent Court of Arbitration in The Hague until 1976.

Dybdal contributed to a number of other legal entities and cases, including the Prison Authority (1946–50), Purge Law cases (1949–55), the Child Welfare Commission (1949–55) and the Criminal Law Commission (1950–53). After chairing the Commission on Insurance Companies in 1953, she became a board member of the Danish Judges Association (1954–59).

Bodil Dybdal died in Copenhagen on 4 June 1992.

== Awards ==
In 1951, Dybdal was one of the first women to be honoured with the Order of the Dannebrog. In 1954, she became a First Class Knight, in 1958 a Commander, in 1967 a First Class Commander and in 1971 she received the Grand Cross.
