= Bowlus Mill House =

Historic house in Maryland

- U.S. National Register of Historic Places
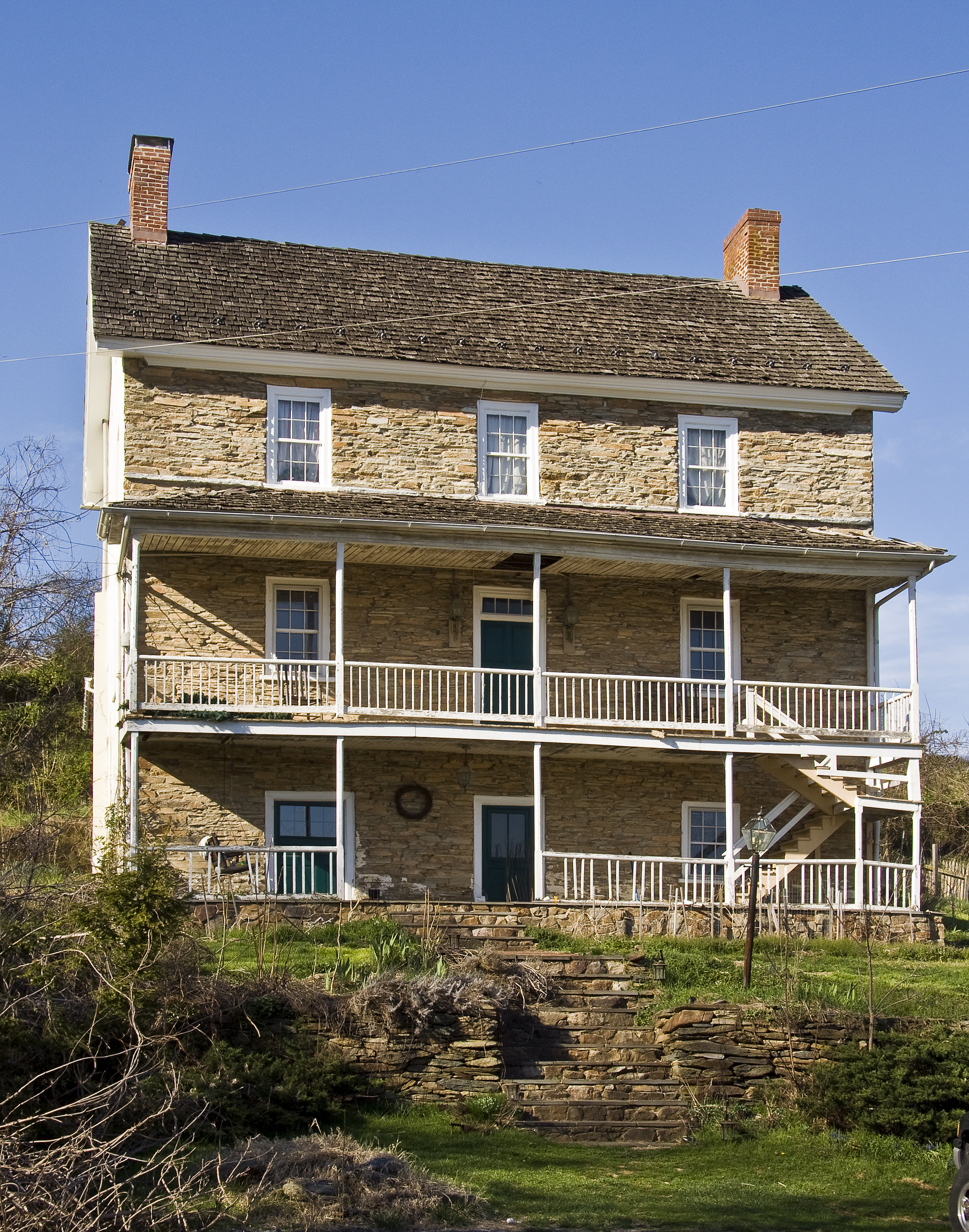
- Bowlus Mill House, April 2010

- Location within Maryland Location within the United States
- Location: 8123 Old Hagerstown Rd., Spoolsville, Maryland
- Coordinates: 39°27′20.30″N 77°33′34.49″W
- Area: 15 acres (6.1 ha)
- Architectural style: Federal
- NRHP reference No.: 96000300
- Added to NRHP: March 26, 1996

The Bowlus Mill House is a historic home and farm complex, located at Spoolsville, Frederick County, Maryland, United States. It consists of the house built of narrow courses of flat cut stones, a frame bank barn on a stone foundation, and a small frame shed. The 2 1/2-story house with an exposed basement was built about 1800, and reflects the Germanic influence typical of the region in the period.

The Bowlus Mill House was listed on the National Register of Historic Places in 1996.
