= Bowlus SP-1 Paperwing =

American glider

SP-1 "Paperwing"
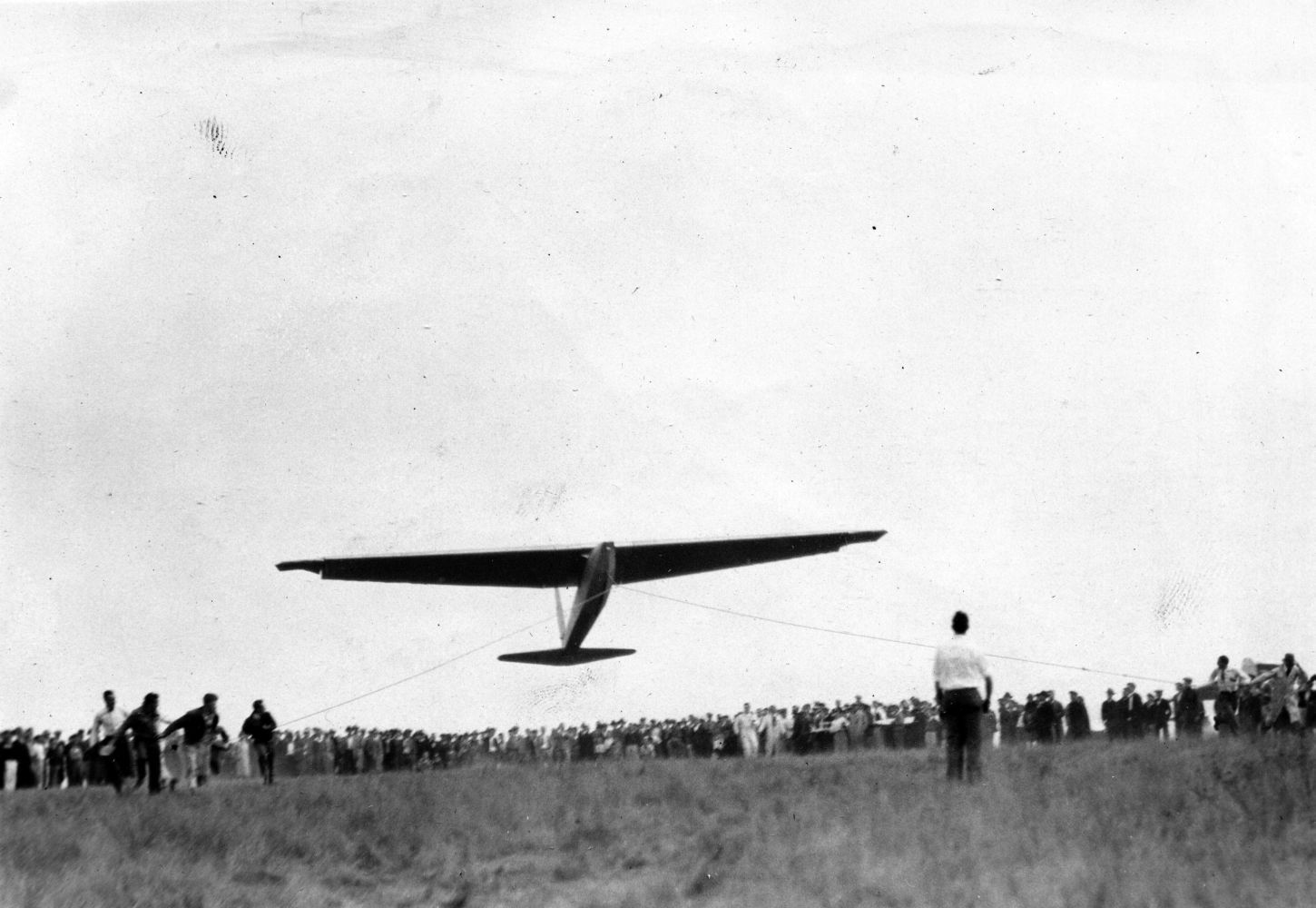
- William Hawley Bowlus launching in the Bowlus SP-1 at the Redondo Beach Glider Meet in December, 1929

General information
- Type: Glider
- National origin: United States
- Manufacturer: William Hawley Bowlus
- Designer: William Hawley Bowlus
- Status: Sole example no longer exists
- Number built: One

History
- First flight: January, 1929

The Bowlus SP-1 Paperwing was an American high-wing cantilever monoplane, single-seat, glider that was designed in 1928 and completed by William Hawley Bowlus on January 1, 1929. The SP-1 was Bowlus' sixteenth glider, and was test flown at Lindbergh Field in San Diego in January, 1929. Later tests were also made from hillsides near Bonita, California, in April, 1929. SP-1 received identification mark "493" from the United States Department of Commerce and was one of the first licensed gliders in the United States. Many refer to the Bowlus SP-1 as the first sailplane of U.S. design and construction.

== Design and development ==
The SP-1 received two nicknames, the first "Old Number 16" as the sixteenth Bowlus glider, and "Paperwing" because its wing rib webs were fabricated from craft paper. The ribs of both the rudder and the elevator were also made with paper webbing. Otherwise the aircraft was predominantly wood and doped aircraft fabric. The aircraft originally had a 44 ft (13.4 m) span wing with a USA 35-A airfoil with conventional aileron control and landing wheels for the rough dirt surface at Lindbergh Field. The wing was later redesigned to include tip-ailerons, extending the wingspan to 47 ft (14.3 m). The aircraft achieved a very low empty weight for its size of 160 lb (72.6 kg) and a matching low wing loading as well. Bowlus's lightweight construction techniques and design philosophies significantly influenced future glider designs, contributing to the evolution of sailplane wing design.

== Operational history ==
Bowlus flew the SP-1 in several regional glider meets in Southern California including two in Pacific Beach, San Diego, and one in Redondo Beach, California, in 1929. On October 5, 1929, Bowlus established a new U.S. soaring endurance record in SP-1 above the cliffs in Point Loma, California, near the Old Point Loma Lighthouse with a flight of 14 minutes and 10 seconds. On October 19, 1929, Bowlus extended this to 1 hour and 21 minutes, to make the first soaring flight over 1 hour duration in the US. SP-1 was used for glider instruction at the Bowlus Glider School in San Diego. Many of the first licensed glider pilots in the U.S. learned to fly in SP-1.

== Variants ==
The Bowlus SP-1 sailplane served as a prototype for a series of other Bowlus designs, first with the Bowlus SP-D, then the Bowlus model "A" and S-1000. Only the single SP-1 sailplane made use of paper ribs, all subsequent Bowlus sailplanes used completely wood and fabric construction. The latter designs also used a larger 60 foot wingspan and were the type used by Charles A. Lindbergh and Anne Morrow Lindbergh to establish their glider licenses in 1930. Bowlus later used a Bowlus model A sailplane design to set several other endurance records, while student Jack Barstow used a Bowlus model A to set an unofficial world record for glider endurance of 15 hours and 13 minutes at Point Loma in 1930.

Many variants patterned from the Bowlus SP-1 through Bowlus S-1000 series were constructed, including the Silver King by Harland Ross, and the Nighthawk, a sailplane flown by William A. Cocke to a world endurance record of 21 hours 34 minutes in 1931. The Nighthawk is in the collection of the Los Angeles County Museum of Natural History and was, for a time, displayed at the Santa Monica Museum of Flying.

== Aircraft on display ==
- San Diego Air & Space Museum – Bowlus SP-1 (replica)
- Wings of History Museum – Bowlus S-1000 (317W; original) in storage

== Specifications (SP-1) ==
General characteristics

- Crew: one
- Wingspan: 44 ft (13 m)
- Wing area: 179 sq ft (16.6 m^{2})
- Aspect ratio: 11:1
- Airfoil: USA 35-A
- Empty weight: 160 lb (73 kg) with landing gear 180 lbs
- Gross weight: 305 lb (138 kg)

Performance

- Cruise speed: 22 mph (35 km/h, 19 kn)
- Maximum glide ratio: 20:1
- Wing loading: 1.7 lb/sq ft (8.3 kg/m^{2})

== See also ==
Related lists

- List of gliders
