= Bowlus TG-12 =

WWII American training glider

TG-12

General information
- Type: Glider
- National origin: United States
- Manufacturer: Bowlus Sailplanes
- Number built: 0

History
- Developed from: Bowlus XBM-5

The Bowlus TG-12 was a proposed American training glider conceived by Bowlus in the early 1940s.

== Design and development ==
The TG-12 was designed as a two-seat training glider with a side-by-side cockpit configuration, based on the company's XBM-5 (company designation). Three TG-12s were ordered on 28 April 1942 with the serials 42-96830/96832 along with a static test airframe, but the order was cancelled on 5 August 1943 without any aircraft being built.

== Variants ==
Bowlus XTG-12-BS
2 completed (Baugher lists only 42-57200), 3 ordered
Bowlus XTG-12A-BS
conflicting info., poss. side-by-side one ordered/poss. civil impress.
Bowlus TG-12A-BS
[Project] production model, contract cancelled

(Note: the TG-12B was a separate design: a Bowlus built Mitchell M1PU3

== Specifications ==
Data from

General characteristics

- Crew: one
- Length: 24 ft 10 in (7.56 m)
- Wingspan: 45 ft 5 in (13.84 m)

Performance

- Maximum speed: 100 mph (160 km/h, 87 kn)

== See also ==
- List of gliders
