= Doran Isackson =

American politician (1938–1989)

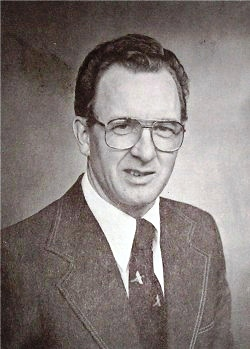

Member of the Minnesota Senate from the 28th district
- In office January 4, 1983 – January 5, 1987
- Succeeded by: Jim Vickerman

Personal details
- Born: March 26, 1938 Alexandria, Minnesota
- Died: September 28, 1989 Storden, Minnesota
- Party: Republican Party of Minnesota
- Spouse: Rosemary
- Children: 3
- Education: University of Minnesota
- Occupation: Legislator, Farmer

Doran L. Isackson (March 26, 1938 – September 28, 1989) was a Republican politician from Minnesota and a Minnesota State Senator. Elected in 1982, Isackson served one term from 1983 to 1987. Democrat Jim Vickerman unseated him in the wave of DFL victories that swept southwestern Minnesota in the DFL "Firestorm" of 1986.

From the town of Storden, Isackson represented the old District 28 (most of which is in the current District 22), which included all or portions of Brown, Cottonwood, Jackson, Martin, Murray, Nobles, Redwood and Watonwan counties. A farmer by profession, Isackson grew up in Douglas County, graduated from Alexandria High School in 1956, and was a 1960 graduate of the University of Minnesota with a degree in agricultural education. While at the university, he was a member of the Department of Animal Science's 1958 Poultry Judging Team.

Isackson's legislative concerns in office included agriculture, business climate, jobs, the economy, workers' compensation, education, and transportation. He served on the Minnesota Senate's Agriculture & Natural Resources, Local & Urban Government, Public Utilities & State Regulated Industries, and Veterans & General Legislation committees and various subcommittees relevant to each.

Isackson died unexpectedly at his home in Storden on September 28, 1989.

== Election results: 1982-1986 ==
1986 Minnesota Senate District 28 Election
Party	Candidate	Votes	%	±%
Republican	Doran Isackson (Inc.)	10,166	42.70%	
Democratic	Jim Vickerman	12,986	54.85%	

1982 Minnesota Senate District 28 Election
Party	Candidate	Votes	%	±%
Republican	Doran Isackson	13,640	50.86%	
Democratic	Bob Moritz	12,347	46.04%	
