= Quirijn Boel =

Flemish engraver (1620–1668)

Coryn Boel
- Born: 25 January 1620; Antwerp
- Died: 1668; Antwerp

Quirijn or Coryn Boel the Younger (25 January 1620 – 1668) was a Flemish engraver.

== Life ==
Boel was born in Antwerp as the son of Jan Boel. He was the nephew of Quirijn Boel the Elder. Boel worked in Antwerp and in Brussels.

His three children were born and baptized in Brussels between 1656 and 1661. The godfathers of the children included prominent painters active in Brussels who were originally from Antwerp such as David Teniers the Younger and Peter Snayers.

He died in either Antwerp or Brussels.

== Work ==
Boel is known for engravings after old master paintings, most notably a selection of paintings for David Teniers the Younger for his Theatrum Pictorium.

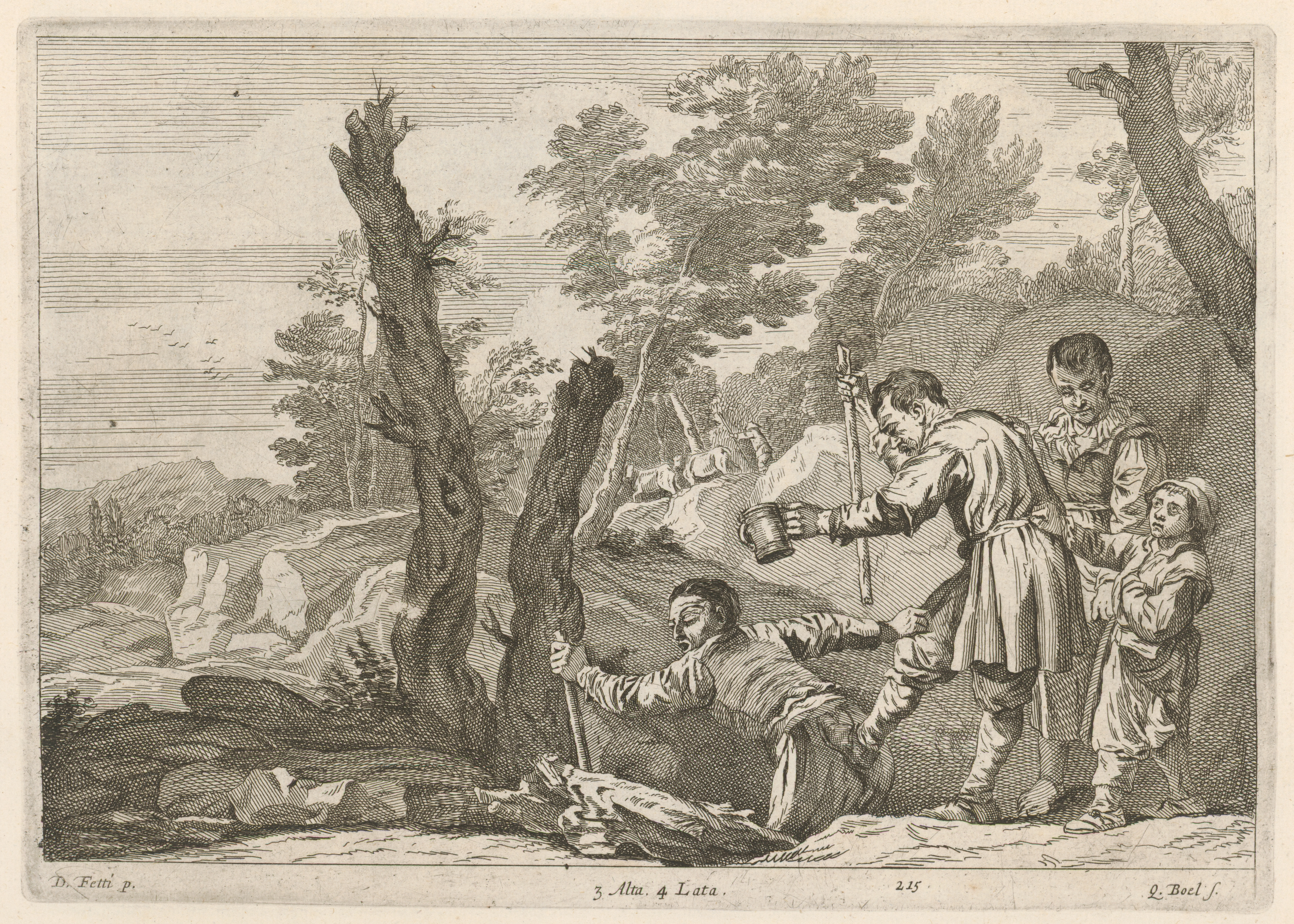
Engraving of The Blind Leading the Blind after a painting by Domenico Fetti

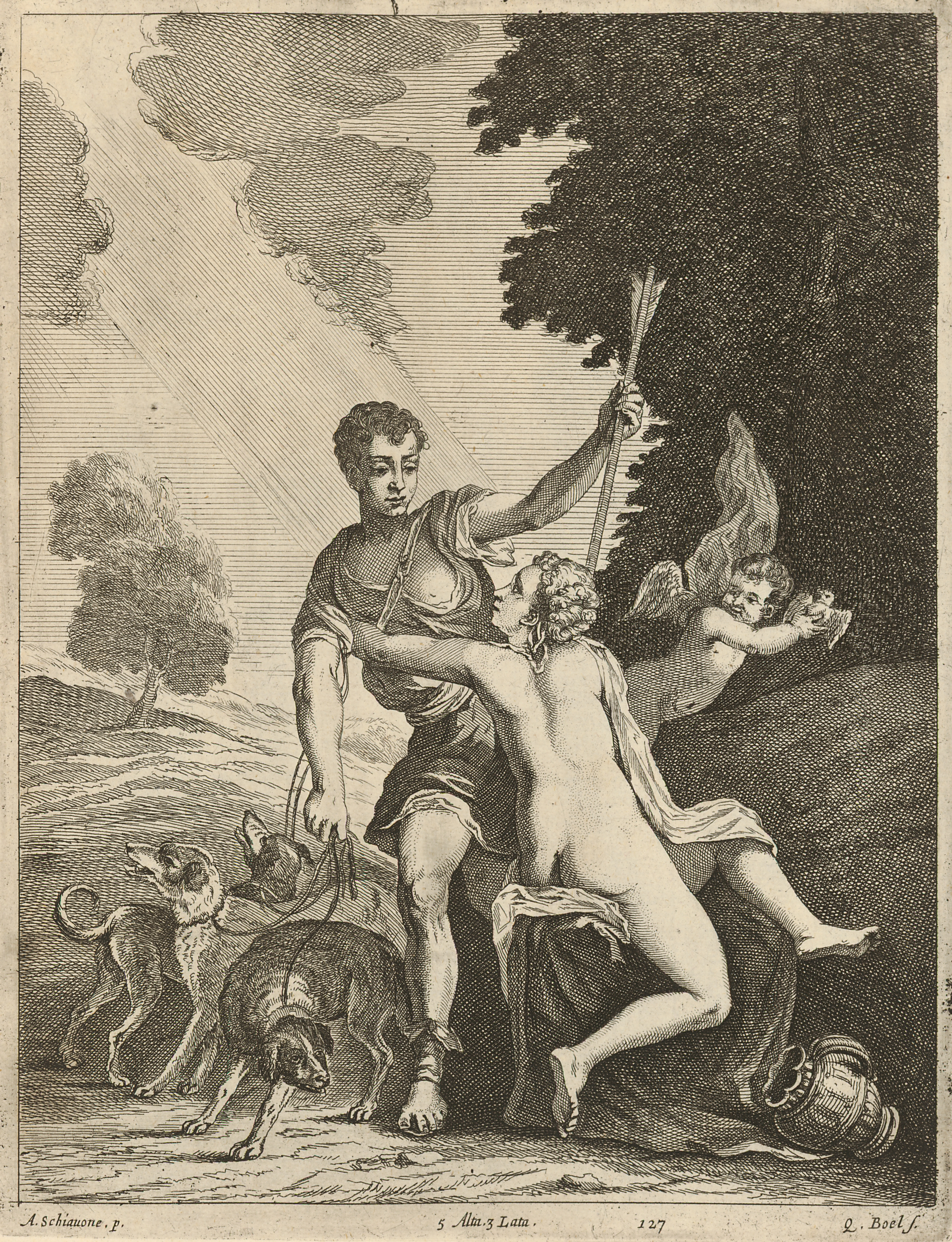
Engraving of Venus and Adonis, after a painting by Andrea Schiavone
