= Jim Vickerman =

American politician (1931–2021)

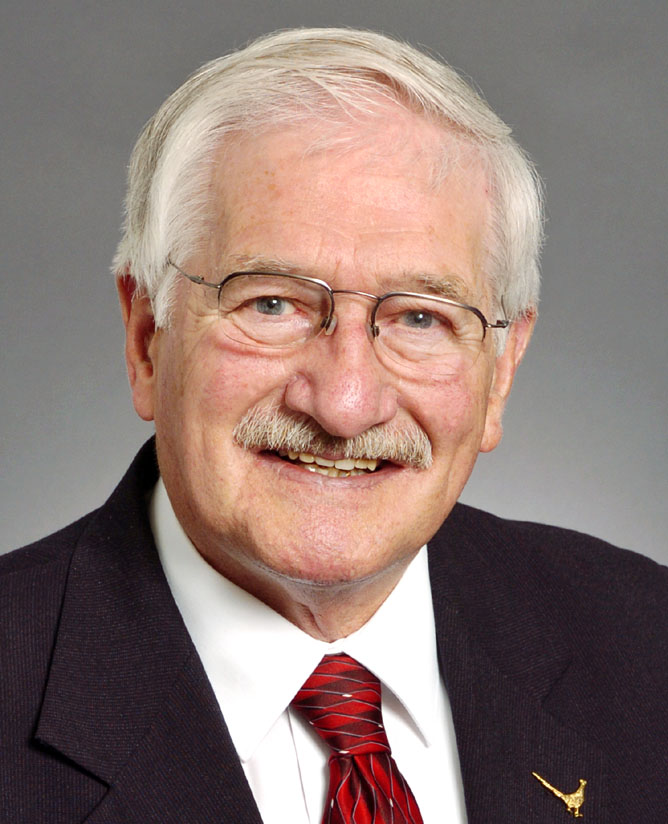

Member of the Minnesota Senate from the 22nd district
- In office January 6, 1987 – January 3, 2011
- Preceded by: Doran Isackson
- Succeeded by: Doug Magnus

Personal details
- Born: James Murray Vickerman; May 1, 1931 Tracy, Minnesota
- Died: January 19, 2021 (aged 89) Marshall, Minnesota
- Party: Democratic-Farmer-Labor Party
- Spouse: Wava Carlson Vickerman
- Children: 6
- Relatives: Barbara Vickerman (cousin-in-law)
- Occupation: Legislator, Farmer

James Murray Vickerman (May 1, 1931 – January 19, 2021) was an American politician from Minnesota who served as Minnesota State Senator, first elected in 1986 in the Minnesota Democratic-Farmer-Labor Party's "firestorm" that swept southwestern Minnesota during the height of the 1980s Midwestern farm crisis. In that election, he unseated incumbent Senator Doran Isackson, winning by a substantial margin. He was re-elected in 1990, 1992, 1996, 2000, 2002 and 2006. On February 22, 2010, he announced that he would not seek an eighth term, noting that he was doing so "with the satisfaction that when it's done right, our government can and does serve people." His term officially ended on January 3, 2011.

== Senate representation and leadership ==
Vickerman, who lived just outside Tracy, represented District 22, including all of Cottonwood, Jackson, Murray, Nobles, Pipestone and Rock counties. Prior to redistricting in the early 1990s, the area was known as District 28, and included all or portions of Brown, Cottonwood, Jackson, Martin, Murray, Nobles, Redwood and Watonwan counties.

Vickerman was chair of the Senate Agriculture and Veterans Committee, and of the Agriculture and Veterans Budget and Policy Division of the Finance Committee. He served on the Environment and Natural Resources Committee, the Finance Committee, the State and Local Government Operations and Oversight Committee, and the Environment, Energy & Natural Resources Budget Division of the Finance Committee. He also previously served as chair of the Veterans and General Legislation Committee, the State and Local Government Operation Committee, and the Rules and Administration Committee, and as vice chair of the Health and Human Services Committee. He was Majority Whip from 2003 through 2007.

Vickerman served three terms on the Minnesota Rural Health Advisory Committee, being first appointed by Governor Arne Carlson in 1995. He was re-appointed by Governor Jesse Ventura in 1999, and by Governor Tim Pawlenty in 2003.

Vickerman sponsored legislation and actively promoted the establishment of the Feeding Minnesota Task Force, which brings together leaders from the agriculture community to find ways to best help food banks across Minnesota. He noted that his motivation for creating the task force was because Minnesota's food shelves have a difficult time keeping up with demand, and the agricultural community is in a unique position to ensure that harvested food that is not sold gets to people who need it, rather than going to waste.

Vickerman's special legislative concerns included taxes, the environment and natural resources, health and human services, agriculture, local and metro government and community issues, education, rural health issues, transportation, and veterans.

On May 8, 2010, Vickerman received the Walter and Joan Mondale Award for Outstanding Public Service, recognizing distinguished lifetime achievement in public service. The award was presented at the DFL Party's annual Humphrey Day Dinner in Minneapolis.

== Rural roots and family background ==
Vickerman was raised in a Minnesota farm family in Murray County. His father was involved in local township government throughout most of the senator's childhood. This early exposure carved a path for Vickerman's second career in politics. He initially participated in local government as a twelve-year member of the area soil and water board, and later served as a Murray County Commissioner, prior to being elected to the Minnesota Senate. He and his wife, Wava, were married in 1950, and are the parents of six children. His cousin-in-law Barbara Vickerman also served in the Minnesota legislature.

Vickerman died in Marshall, Minnesota, on January 19, 2021, at age 89. His wife, Wava, died in Tracy on August 25, 2022, at age 91.

== Election result: 1986-2006 ==
2006 Minnesota Senate District 22 Election
Party	Candidate	Votes	%	±%
Democratic	Jim Vickerman	17,683	57.98%	
Republican	Bill Weber	12,789	41.94%	
N/A	Write-In	24	0.08%	

2002 Minnesota Senate District 22 Election
Party	Candidate	Votes	%	±%
Democratic	Jim Vickerman	20,187	62.04%	
Republican	Alex Frick	12,325	37.88%	

2000 Minnesota Senate District 22 Election
Party	Candidate	Votes	%	±%
Democratic	Jim Vickerman	19,456	65.11%	
Republican	Roger Baumann	10,425	34.89%	

1996 Minnesota Senate District 22 Election
Party	Candidate	Votes	%	±%
Democratic	Jim Vickerman	26,595	83.85%	
Republican	No candidate	0	0%	

1992 Minnesota Senate District 22 Election
Party	Candidate	Votes	%	±%
Democratic	Jim Vickerman	21,999	64.17%	
Republican	Gary Spaeth	11,414	33.29%	

1990 Minnesota Senate District 28 Election
Party	Candidate	Votes	%	±%
Democratic	Jim Vickerman	13,396	55.60%	
Republican	Ron Harder	10,246	42.53%	

1986 Minnesota Senate District 28 Election
Party	Candidate	Votes	%	±%
Democratic	Jim Vickerman	12,986	54.85%	
Republican	Doran Isackson (Inc.)	10,166	42.70%	
