= René Boël =

Belgian industrialist

- Born: René Gustav Pol Marie Ghislain; 27 October 1899; Brussels
- Died: 29 June 1990 (aged 90); Court-Saint-Étienne
- Occupation: industrialist

Count René Boël (1899–1990) was a Belgian industrialist and Director of the Usine Gustave Boël. He was married to Yvonne Solvay (1896–1930), granddaughter of Ernest Solvay. They have two sons Yves Boël and Pol Boël and one daughter Antoinette Boël (1925–1982).

== Career ==
After his marriage, he became director at UCB and at Solvay. During his career he advised the Belgian government in exile during World War II, and founded the Museum of Modern Art in Brussels. He was the first President of the Belgian-American Association, and chaired, between 1950 and 1981, the European League for Economic Cooperation, and was heavily involved in the European Movement.

== Sources ==
- The Diffusion of US Management Models and the Role of the University: the Case of Belgium (1945-1970) - Kenneth Bertrams, July 2001
- Kenneth Bertrams, Converting Academic Expertize into Industrial Innovation: University-based Research at Solvay and Gevaert, 1900–1970, Enterprise and Society
