= John Bowe (author) =

American author

John Bowe (born 1964 in Minnesota) is an American author and speech expert. He has written for The New York Times Magazine, The New Yorker, GQ, The Nation, McSweeney's, and This American Life. His work has been featured and reviewed in the Harvard Business Review, The New York Times, and he has appeared on CNN, The Daily Show, with Jon Stewart, the BBC, and many others. He is the co-editor of GIG: Americans Talk About Their Jobs (with Sabin Streeter and Marisa Bowe); author of Nobodies: Modern American Slave Labor and the Dark Side of the New Global Economy, editor of US: Americans Talk About Love, and author of I Have Something to Say: Mastering the Art of Public Speaking in an Age of Disconnection. He co-wrote the screenplay for the film Basquiat with Julian Schnabel.

== Early life and education ==
He graduated from Minneapolis' Blake School in 1982, obtained a BA in English (with honors) from the University of Minnesota in 1987 and earned an MFA in film from the Columbia University School of the Arts in 1996.

== Works ==
=== GIG ===
GIG: Americans Talk About Their Jobs, co-edited with Marisa Bowe and Sabin Streeter, is an oral history based on Studs Terkel’s Working, offering a collection of 126 interviews from rich to poor, giving voice to the American labor force. Excerpted in the New Yorker magazine and rated one of the Best Business Books of 2000 by Harvard Business Review.

=== Nobodies ===
Nobodies: Modern American Slave Labor and the Dark Side of the New Global Economy is an examination of modern slavery in the United States, focusing particularly upon the widening gap between rich and poor, both in the US and globally, and what this means for notions of freedom and democracy.

"Nobodies" began as an article published in 2003 for The New Yorker. The book was published by Random House in September 2007.

"Nobodies" follows Bowe's journey inside three illegal workplaces where foreign employees are enslaved, offering exclusive interviews and eyewitness accounts. The book exposes the corporate duplicity, subcontracting and immigration fraud, and moral sleights of hand that allow forced labor to continue in the United States.

The book begins in the fields of Immokalee, Florida where underpaid or unpaid undocumented workers pick the produce that feeds the supply chains of companies such as Pepsi Company and Tropicana. Secondly, Bowe travels to Tulsa, Oklahoma, where the John Pickle Company exploited temporary workers imported from India to boost profits while making pressure tanks used by oil refineries and power plants. Lastly, in Saipan, a U.S. commonwealth, Bowe documents an economy built upon guest workers, where 90 percent of the female population work sixty-hour weeks for $3.05 an hour and spend weekends trying to trade sex for green cards.

Nobodies was named one of the best twenty books of 2007 by Village Voice.

Bowe appeared on The Daily Show on September 24, 2007 to talk about Nobodies.

=== US: Americans Talk About Love ===
US: Americans Talk About Love is a selection of oral histories about relationships. John Bowe collaborated with a team of interviewers and co-editors to record and collect the love stories of a diverse range of U.S citizens. The book has been translated into German, Polish, and Mandarin.

=== I Have Something to Say ===
I Have Something to Say: Mastering the Art of Public Speaking in an Age of Disconnection, Bowe discovers the lost art of speech training and immerses himself in a chapter of Toastmasters International to learn the meaning and value of "public speaking." Between lessons, he explores the roots of speech training and rhetoric in Ancient Greece and connects this once-universal component of education to modern problems of isolation, partisanship, and civic disengagement. I Have Something to Say is less a how-to manual than for rediscovering the importance of this basic building block of civil society.

== Awards ==
John Bowe is a recipient of the J. Anthony Lukas Work-in-Progress Award the Sydney Hillman Award for journalists, writers, and public figures who pursue social justice and public policy for the common good, the Richard J. Margolis Award, dedicated to journalism that combines social concern and humor, and the Harry Chapin Media Award for reportage of hunger- and poverty-related issues.
