= Bølling =

Bølling can refer to:

- Bølling lake, Denmark – a shallow lake in central Jutland, after which the following are named:
- The Bølling Oscillation or Interstadial – a warm phase during the last phase of the Weichsel glaciation in Europe; often referred to as a part of the Bølling–Allerød period, which includes the Older Dryas stadial between them.
- The Bølling Phase – a biostratigraphic subdivision during the early post-glacial period in Europe
