= Cornelis Boel =

Flemish Engraver

Cornelis Boel (c. 1576 – c. 1621) was a Flemish draughtsman and engraver. He is sometimes known as Cornelis Bol, or Cornelis Bol I, to distinguish him from later artists of the same name.

== Life ==
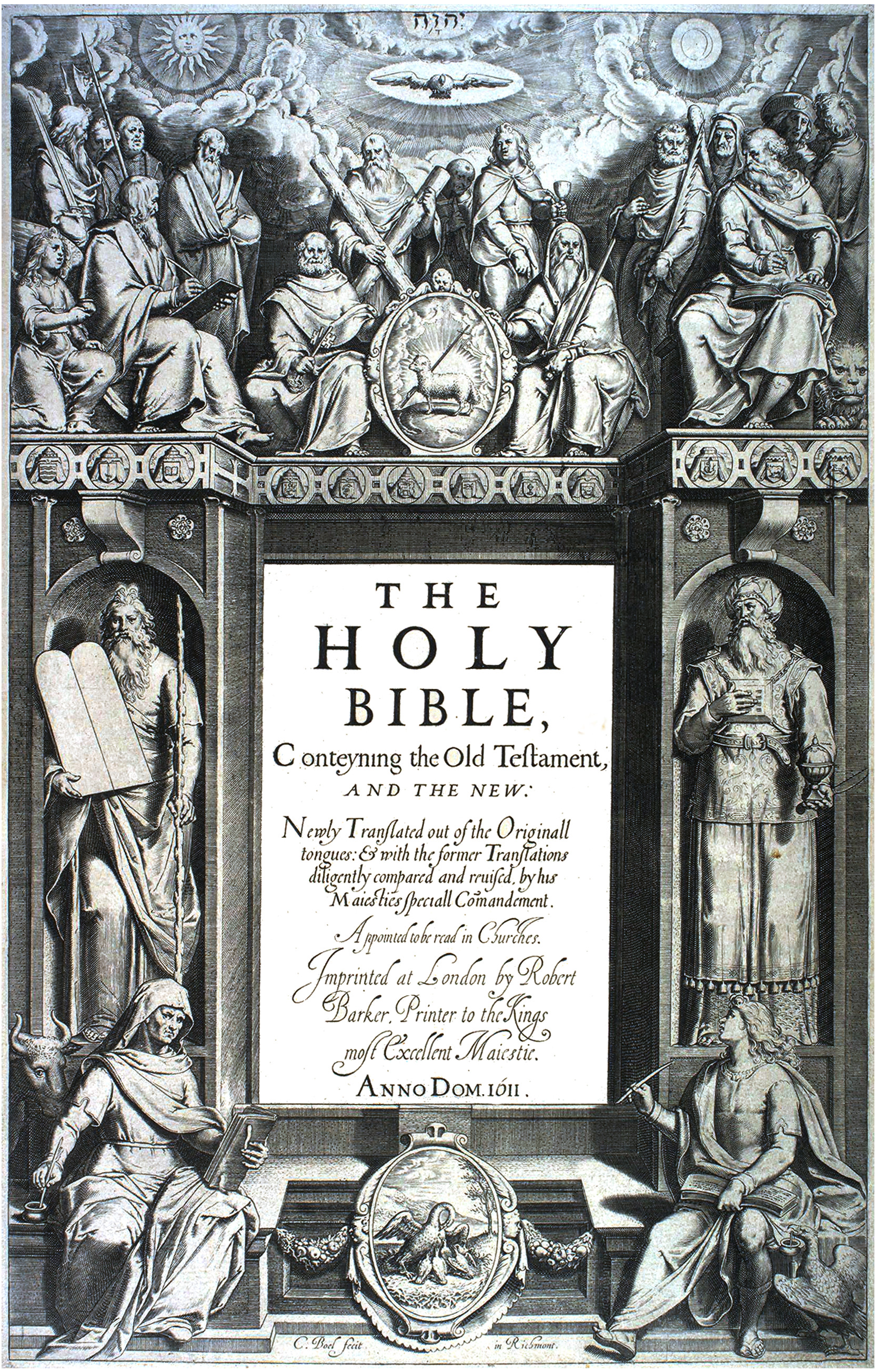
Boel's frontispiece to the first edition of the King James' Bible (1611)

Boel was born at Antwerp in around 1576. He worked mostly as an engraver, in the style of the Sadeler family, of which he was probably a pupil.

His plates are executed in a clear, neat style. He engraved a set of oval plates for the Fables of Otto Voenius, published at Antwerp in 1608. His most substantial works are eight large plates of the battles of Charles V and Francis I, executed in collaboration with Jode de Gheyn, the younger, after Antonio Tempesta. He engraved also the plates to Salomon de Caus's La perspective avec la raison des ombres et miroirs (1611)

He probably spent some time in England, as appears from his frontispiece to the first edition of the translation of the Bible published by royal authority in 1611, later known as the "King James Version", or the "Authorized Version". It is signed "C Boel fecit, in Richmont.", which has been taken as an indication that he engraved it while staying at Richmond Palace. He also engraved a portrait of Henry, Prince of Wales, an oval print with an ornamental border. published by Pieter de Jode I in around 1611–12; Another plate, of The Last Judgment, is signed "Cornelis Boel fecit", with no indication of the name of the painter.
