= Samuel P. Bolling =

American politician (1819–1900)

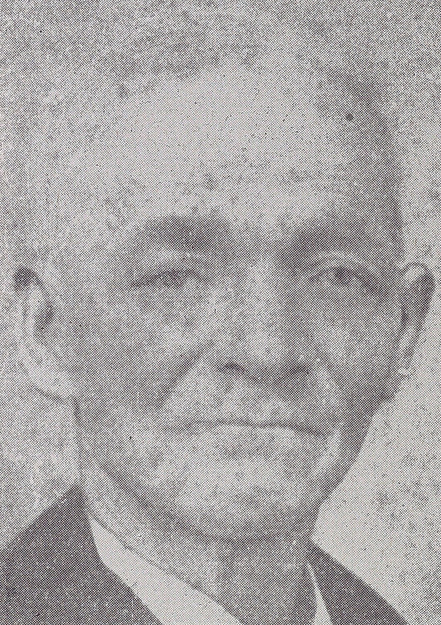
- Photographic portrait of Samuel P. Bolling
- Born: January 10, 1819; Cumberland County, Virginia
- Died: February 8, 1900 (aged 81); Cumberland County, Virginia
- Occupations: Politician, businessman
- Spouse: Ellen
- Children: Phillip S. Bolling

Samuel P. Bolling (January 10, 1819 – February 8, 1900) was an African-American landowner, politician, businessman, and former slave who served in the Virginia House of Delegates. In 2013 Bolling, along with his son Phillip S. Bolling, was one of several African Americans that were commemorated by the Commonwealth of Virginia for their service to the Virginia House of Delegates during the time period of 1869 to 1890.

Bolling was born on January 10, 1819, in Cumberland County, Virginia. As his mother Olive Bolling was a slave, Bolling and his brother were both born into slavery as well. After the Civil War Bolling amassed a large amount of property and worked as a farmer, builder, and brickmaker. He married a woman by the name of Ellen, with whom he had six children, which included his son Phillip, who was elected to the House of Delegates in 1883.

He was a member of the Readjuster Party, for whom he worked as an election judge and in 1885, an election commissioner. In 1883 he was elected to the Cumberland County board of supervisors, a position that he was re-elected to the following year. Bolling won a seat in the House of Delegates in 1885 and ran again in 1887, but lost to Nathaniel M. Griggs. After losing the election Bolling remained active in politics and participated in Republican Party politics and also worked with the 1888 congressional campaign of John Mercer Langston.

Bolling died on February 8, 1900, in Cumberland County.

== See also ==
- African American officeholders from the end of the Civil War until before 1900
