= Airstream =

American brand of caravan

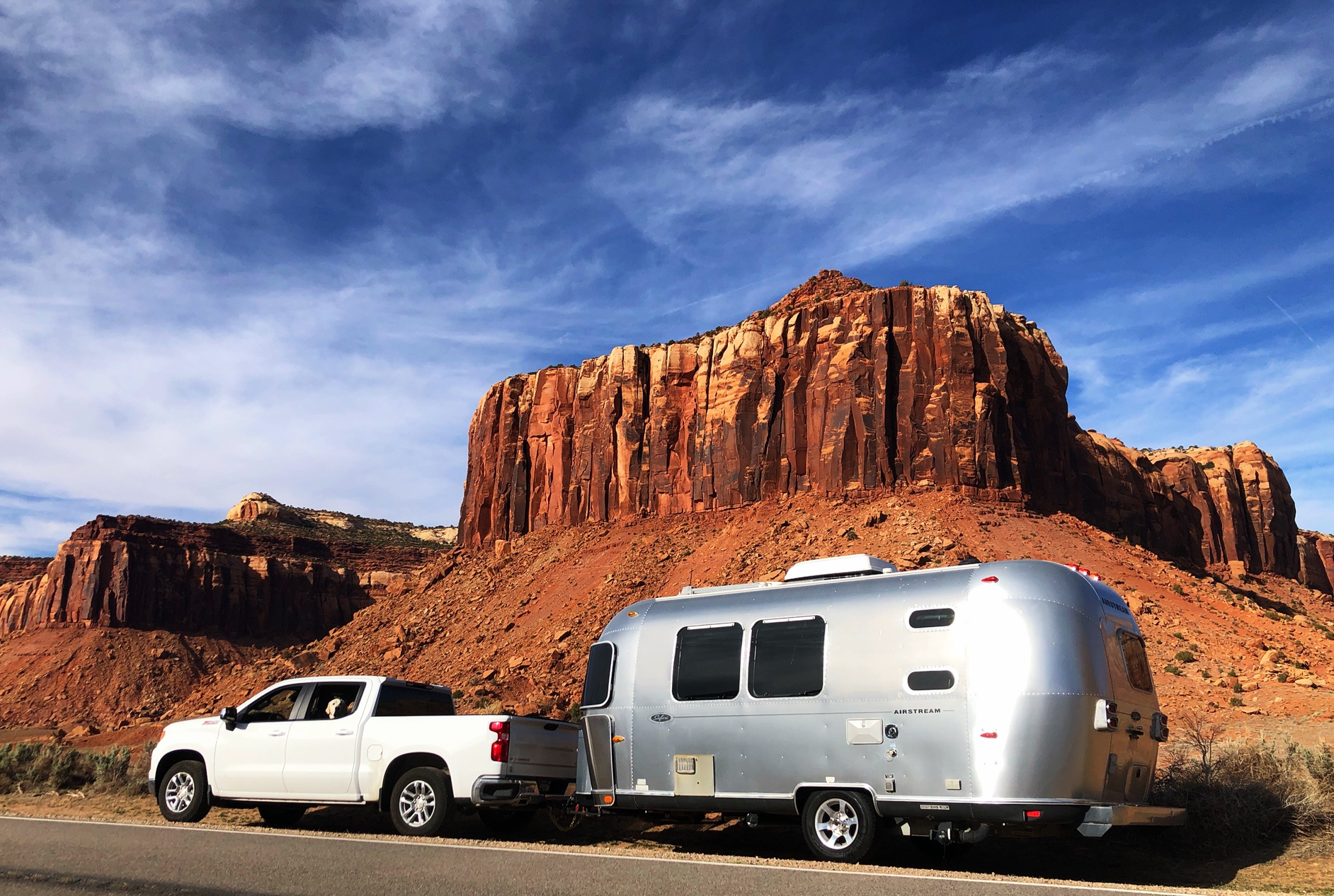
- An Airstream trailer.
- Product type: Travel trailers
- Current owner: Thor Industries
- Introduced: 1927; 99 years ago - 1929; 97 years ago
- Website: Airstream

Airstream is an American brand of travel trailer easily recognized by the distinctive shape of its rounded and polished aluminum coachwork. This body shape dates back to the 1930s and is based on the Bowlus Road Chief, an earlier model of the all-aluminum travel trailer.

Airstream trailers and recreational vehicles are manufactured in Jackson Center, Ohio, United States. The company, now a division of Thor Industries, is the oldest in the industry.

== History ==
Refurbished Airstream trailer, California, March 21, 2013

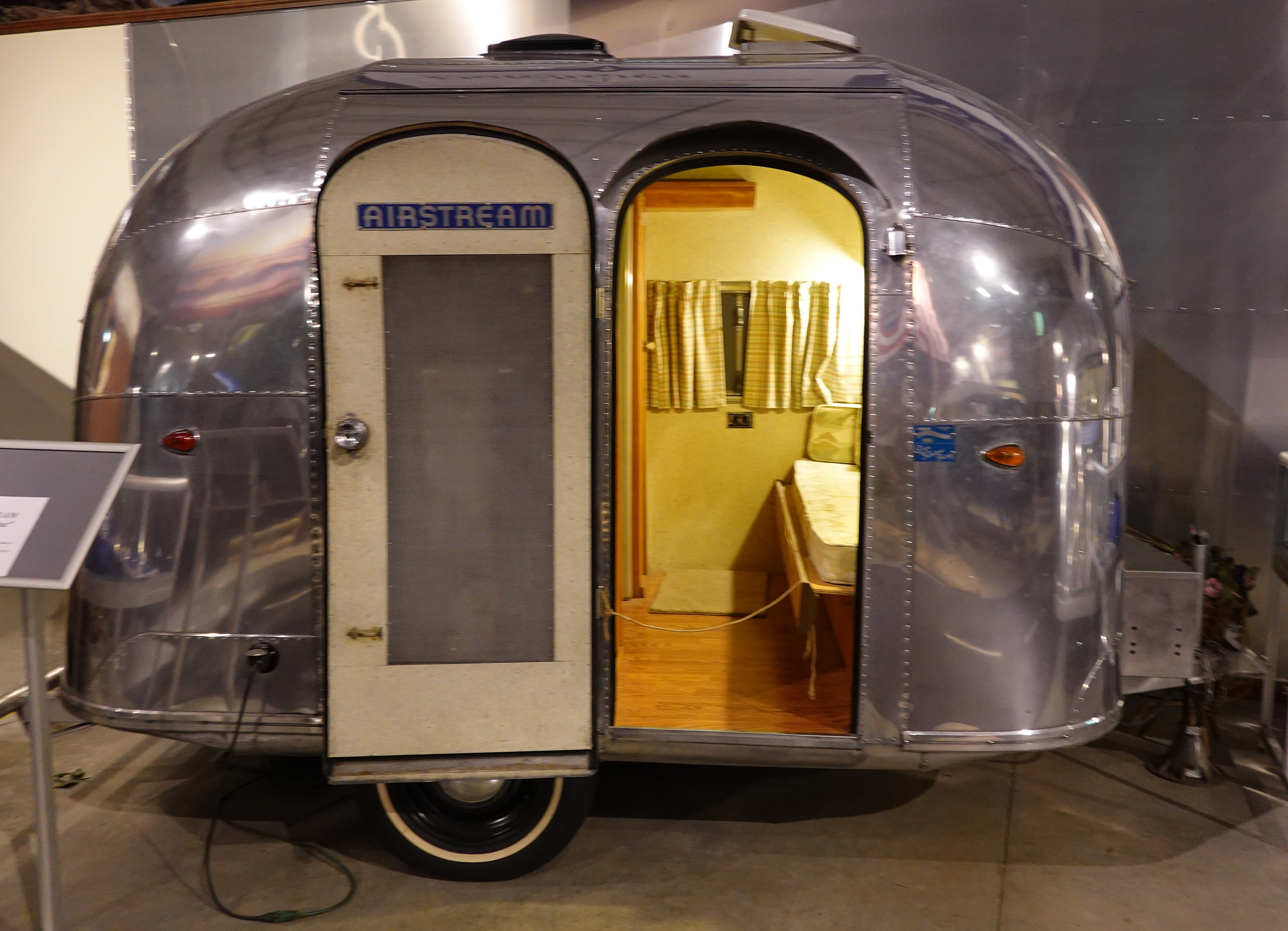
1958 Airstream "Der Kleine Prinz" prototype, displayed in the RV/MH Hall of Fame in Elkhart, Indiana. This model was never mass-produced.

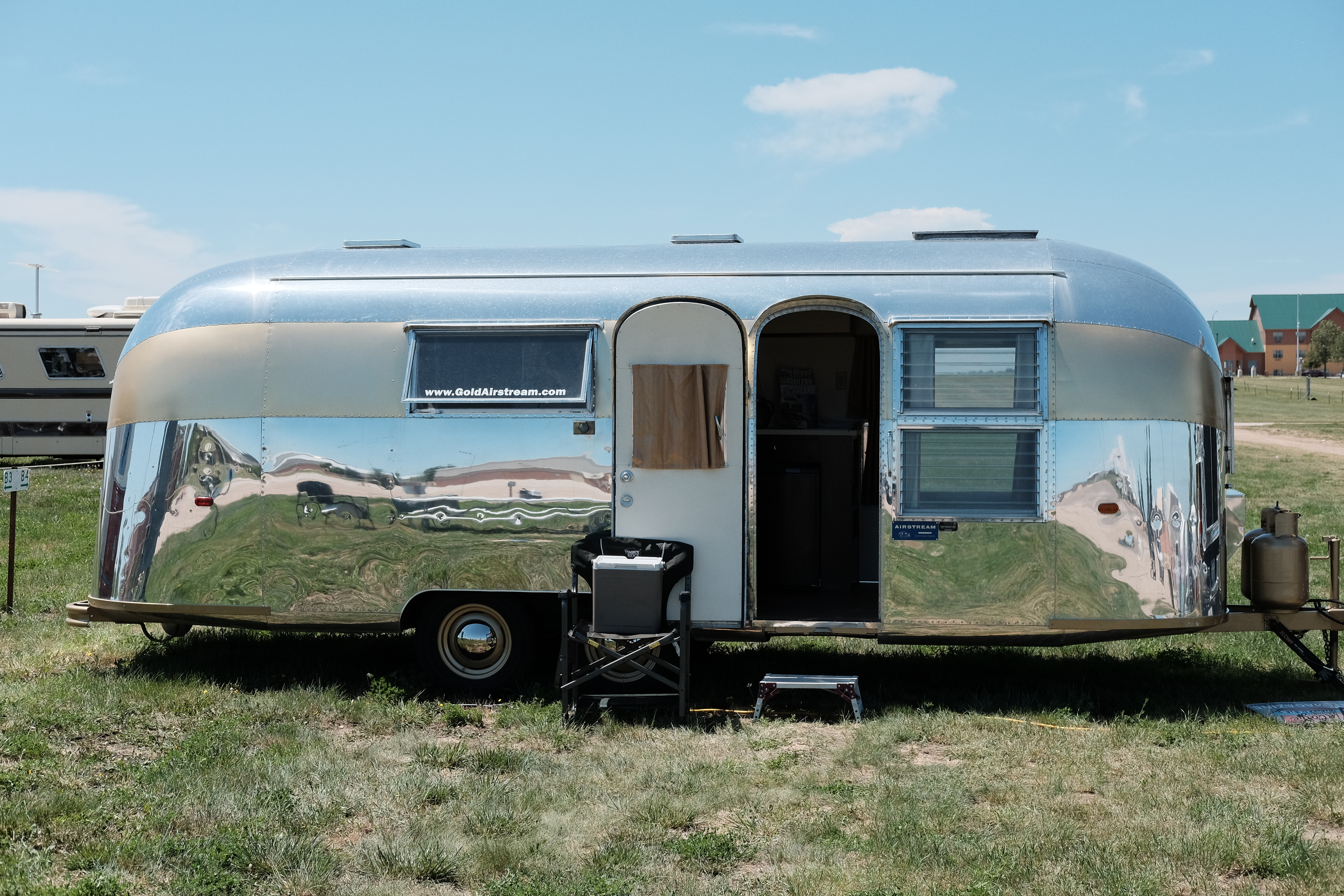
This 1962 Airstream Tradewind on display at the 2019 Vintage Camper Trailer Rally in Gillette, Wyoming was custom ordered by then President of Airstream, Art Costello in 1961. This trailer and Stella's Gold Airstream are the only two known gold Airstreams.

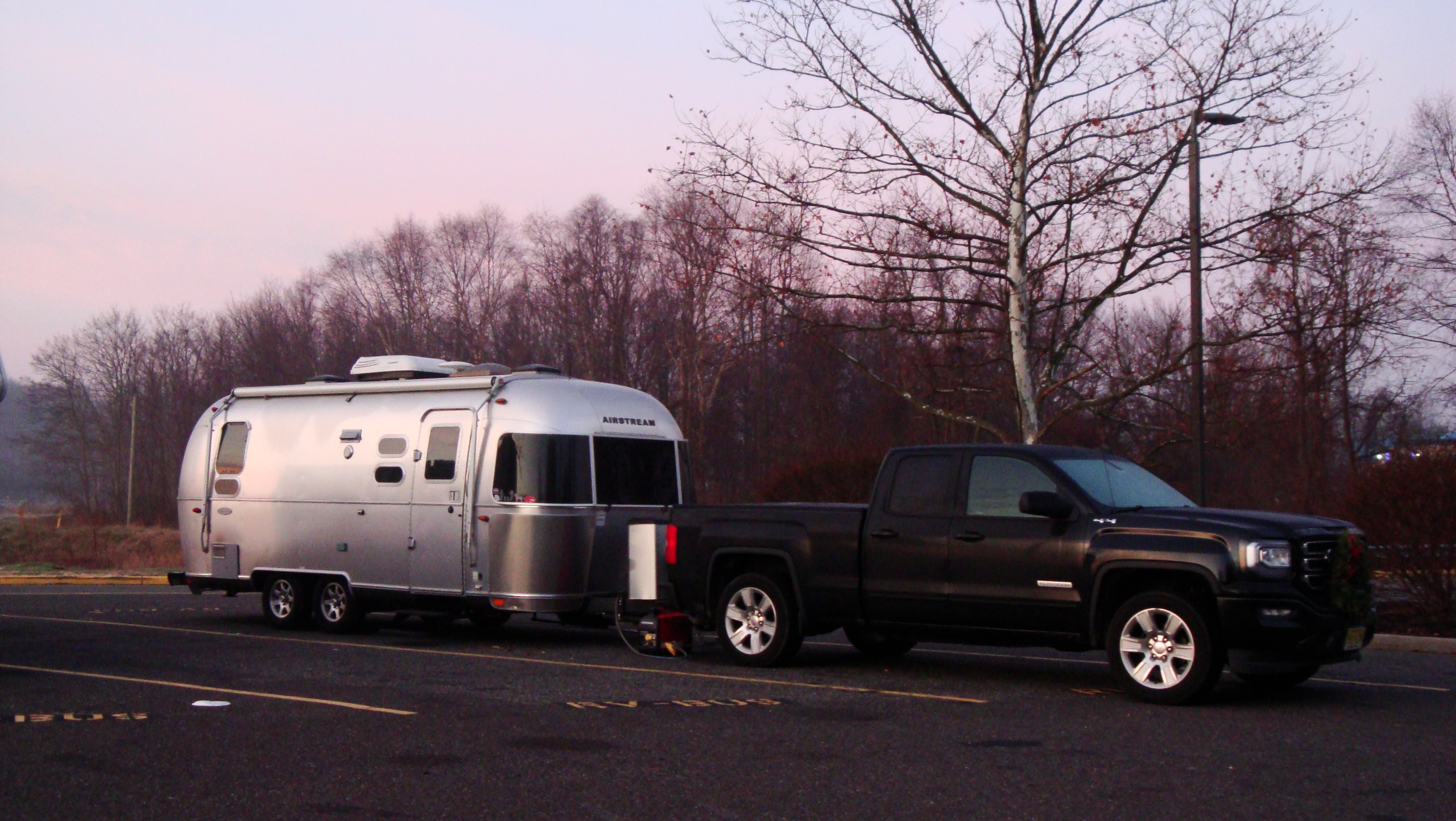
A modern Airstream, 2016 Flying Cloud 23D travel trailer shown with tow vehicle, GMC Sierra

Airstream was created by Wally Byam who began building Masonite trailers in Los Angeles during the late 1920s. In 1936, Byam introduced the "Airstream Clipper", which was essentially a rebadged 1935 Bowlus Road Chief, with the door relocated from the front to the side. The design cut down on wind resistance and thus improved fuel efficiency. It was the first of the now familiar sausage-shaped, silver aluminum Airstream trailers. In 1936, the first Airstream was introduced. It sold for $1,200 (equivalent to about $30,000 in 2025) and was able to house four people with electric lights and a water supply. Of more than 400 travel trailer builders operating in 1936, Airstream was the sole survivor of the Depression.

During World War II, travel became a luxury most could not afford and non-military industries faced an acute aluminum shortage. When World War II ended, the economy boomed, and people's attention once again turned towards leisure travel. Byam's company went back into production in 1948. In July 1952, a new facility in Jackson Center, Ohio, was established. 1979 saw the last Airstreams to be manufactured in California.

During the 1970s energy crisis, Airstream launched a line of painted travel trailers in the same 'twinkie' shape as Airstreams that the company dubbed the Argosy. At first, Airstream did not market the Argosy relationship with Airstream. This changed in 1973. Argosy travel trailers of this shape were manufactured from 1972 to 1979 in a factory Versailles, Ohio. These trailers were also built largely of aluminum like their Airstream brethren, but the external panels were painted and the interior components were lighter and less expensive, making lighter travel trailers that would take less fuel to pull. The list prices were also lower than that of Airstreams.

Other differences between Airstream and Argosy were the galvanized steel endcaps featured on the Argosy, as well as the Argosy panoramic front windows—the first to appear on an Airstream-produced trailer. The steel endcaps required paint to avoid corrosion and rust.

While the Argosy of this shape were no longer made after 1979, Airstream produced a rectangular version of the Argosy from 1986 to 1988. The company also briefly produced a fifth wheel version. The company produced rectangular versions of the Airstream Land Yacht, often referred to as 'squarestreams'. This version of the Airstream, as well as all versions of the Argosy, were not allowed into the Wally Byam Caravan Club for many years.

In 1974, Airstream began manufacturing a Class A motorhome, which were also badged as Argosy. They were followed in 1979 by the first examples of the Classic model motorhome, with an unpainted aluminum body much like the trailers.

In 1981, Airstream's Commercial Vehicle Division marketed a Class A motorhome as a funeral coach. It was designed to transport family, flowers and the deceased from the funeral home to the cemetery.

The aluminum motorhomes were followed by more traditional-looking fiberglass models in the 1990s. Airstream discontinued the manufacture of Class A motorhomes in 2006.

=== Nest acquisition ===
In 2016, Airstream acquired the Oregon-based company, Nest Caravans. Nest trailers were made of molded fiberglass. The Nest was a smaller and lower priced trailer than any in the Airstream line, but at the upper end of prices for its market segment. Airstream moved the company to Ohio and expanded staff for production with Airstream Nest trailers scheduled to be available in early 2018. The Airstream Nest was withdrawn from the market in September 2020.

In February 2022, the company unveiled the concept for an all-electric Airstream that can recharge from electric outlets at campgrounds and that has regenerative braking.

== Airstream distribution in Europe ==
Airstreams are distributed in the United Kingdom and Ireland by Lowdhams Airstream Direct (Lowdham Leisure World Ltd) with four models made for Europe and specifically tuned for the British market. The International "534", "604", "684" and the new "25" have been created with smaller dimensions to accommodate narrower European roads. The International models are still entirely manufactured at the headquarters in Ohio and shipped over for final fit of market specific items. Airstreams are also popular amongst the European market for takeaway diners and business stands.

Airstreams in Europe are distributed by Airstream Germany and Airstream Italy.

== Airstreams in U.S. government ==
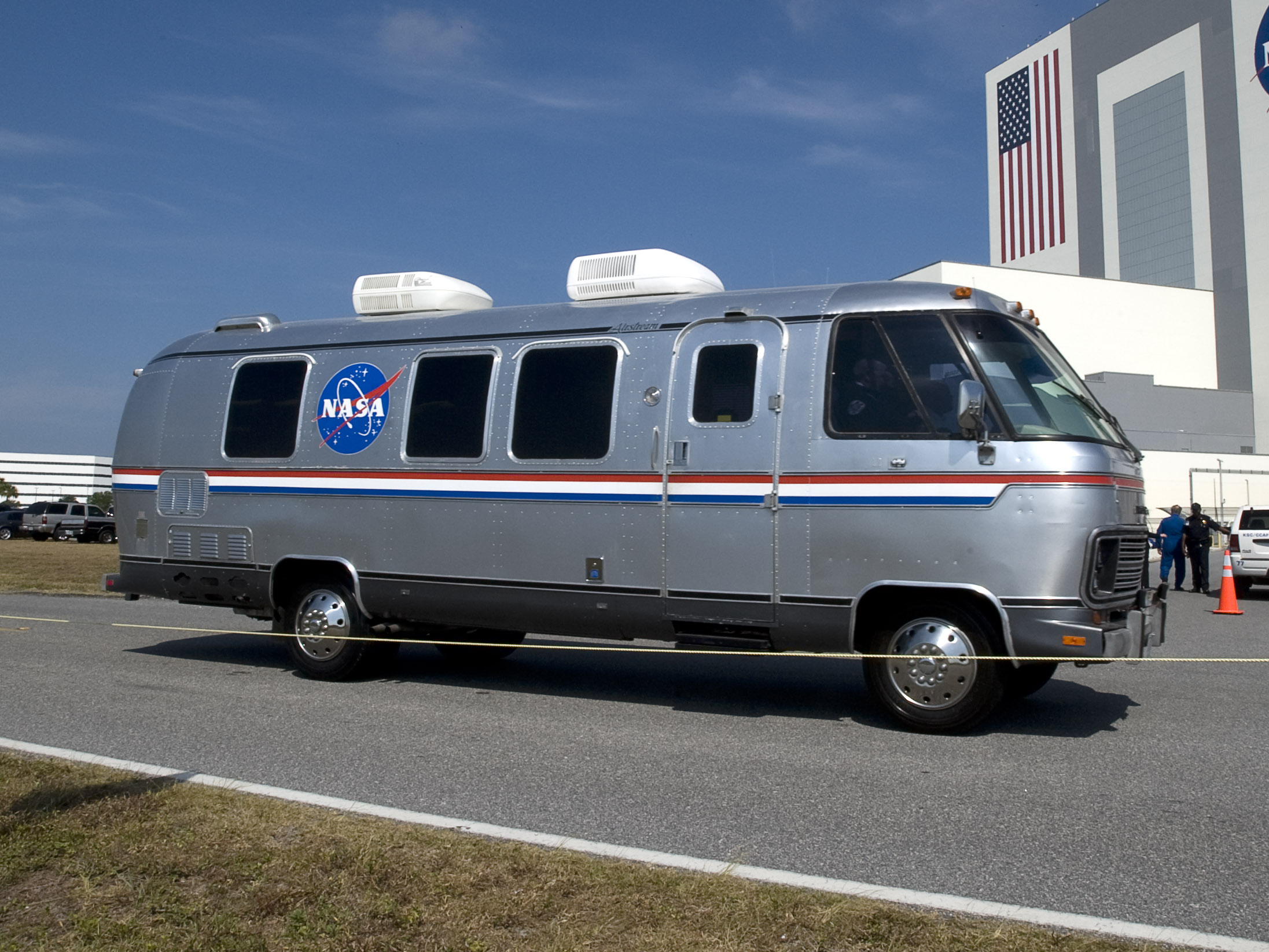
The Astrovan drives in front of NASA's Vehicle Assembly Building.

=== Space program ===
Upon their return from the Moon, the crewmen of the missions Apollo 11, 12, and 14 were quarantined, until it was deemed that there was little likelihood of them having brought back lunar pathogens. From the crew's collection aboard an aircraft carrier, until their arrival in the Lunar Receiving Laboratory in Houston, they were housed in the mobile quarantine facility, which was a modified airtight Airstream trailer. Four were built in total and the three that were actually used can be seen on display at various space museums.

For decades, NASA has used a fleet of Airstream motorhomes to transport astronauts to the launch pad. The space shuttle program used a modified 1983 Airstream Excella beginning in 1984 dubbed the Astrovan.

On October 21, 2019, Airstream and Boeing announced that a modified Airstream Atlas (which also uses a Mercedes-Benz Sprinter chassis), will be used to transport Boeing commercial crew astronauts to the launch pad where they would board the CST-100 Starliner on their way to the International Space Station.

=== United States Air Force ===
The United States Air Force uses a modified version of the Airstream Silver Bullet aboard C-17 aircraft when officials from the Air Force, Department of Defense, or the United States Government are traveling overseas. However, in 2019 it was announced that by 2022 it would be replaced by custom Roll-On Conference Capsules that are airworthy for the entirety of the flight, unlike the modified Airstreams. The trailers are strapped down inside military cargo planes and feature leather seats, air conditioning and climate control, wood paneling, porcelain toilet, LED televisions, surround sound, and Blu-ray players.

== Airstream parks ==
There are more than a dozen Airstream parks throughout the United States. These are RV resorts or campgrounds where owners of Airstream-manufactured units are allowed to buy, rent, or lease a site such as AutoCamp. Some of these facilities welcome non-Airstream products, while others are more strict in their admission.
