= Briegleb BG-12 =

BG-12
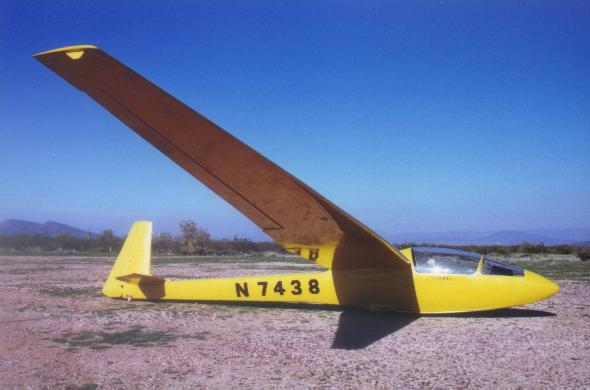
- BG 12/16 variant

General information
- Type: Sailplane
- National origin: United States
- Manufacturer: Sailplane Corporation of America for Homebuilding
- Designer: Gus Briegleb

History
- First flight: 1956
- Developed from: Briegleb BG-6

The Briegleb BG-12 is a single-seat sailplane of wooden construction developed in the United States in the 1950s. It was marketed for homebuilding in plans or kit form, with over 350 sets of plans selling by 1978. The BG-12 is a conventional sailplane design, with a high cantilever wing and a conventional empennage. Later models featured a highly revised fuselage, a swept-forward tail fin, and an all flying tailplane with balance tabs.

== Variants ==
BG-12
prototype derived from BG-6
BG-12A
Initial market version
BG-12B
1963 version with revised wing
BG-12BD
BG-12B with revised wing and ailerons
BG-12C
Flapless 15 metre wing to meet FAI Standard Class requirements, one built.
BG-12/16
Revised, lower-drag fuselage and tail fin, all flying tailplane
Jobagy Bagyjo
BG-12 fuselage and empennage with Cherokee II Wings. Built in 1962 by John Jobagy, currently on display at the Aero Space Museum of Calgary
Niedrauer NG-1
BG-12/16 fuselage shortened 9 inches and lengthened to accommodate reclined pilot position. BG-12B Horizontal tail. Airfoil changed to a NACA 4400 series. L/D of 35:1 at 55 mph (89 km/h).

== Aircraft on display ==
- US Southwest Soaring Museum
- Aero Space Museum of Calgary
- National Soaring Museum
- Mid-Atlantic Air Museum

== Specifications (BG 12BD) ==
General characteristics

- Crew: One pilot
- Length: 21 ft 11 in (6.68 m)
- Wingspan: 50 ft 0 in (15.24 m)
- Height: 4 ft 0 in (1.22 m)
- Wing area: 141 sq ft (13.1 m^{2})
- Aspect ratio: 17.7
- Empty weight: 500 lb (227 kg)
- Gross weight: 900 lb (409 kg)

Performance

- Maximum speed: 135 mph (217 km/h, 117 kn)
- Maximum glide ratio: 34
- Rate of sink: 136 ft/min (0.70 m/s)

== See also ==
- Briegleb El Mirage Airfield

Related development

- Briegleb BG-6

Related lists

- List of Gliders
