= Briegleb BG-08 =

BG-08

General information
- Type: Two-seat Training Glider
- National origin: United States
- Manufacturer: Sailplane Corporation of America
- Designer: William G Briegleb

The Briegleb BG-08 was a 1940s two-seat glider designed by William G. Briegleb.

== Development ==
The BG-08 was a high-wing tandem two-seat glider with a steel-tube-and-fabric fuselage, wooden wings with fabric covering and a metal-and-fabric tail. The type certificate was approved on 31 December 1942.

The glider was built by Briegleb's company, the Sailplane Corporation of America. Three gliders were impressed into service with the United States Army Air Forces in 1942.

== Variants ==
BG-08
Company designation
XTG-13
United States Army Air Corps designation for one BG-8 which was impressed as training glider in 1942.
TG-13
United States Army Air Corps designation for two BG-8s which were impressed as training gliders in 1942.

== Operators ==
United States

- United States Army Air Corps

== See also ==
- Briegleb El Mirage Airfield

Related lists

- List of Gliders
