= KVCV =

KVCV may refer to:

- Southern California Logistics Airport (ICAO code KVCV)
- KVCV-LD, a low-power television station (channel 23, virtual 48) licensed to serve Victoria, Texas, United States; see List of television stations in Texas
- KVCV-LP, a defunct low-power television station (channel 42) formerly licensed to serve Victoria, Texas
