= Martin F. Scanlon =

United States Air Force general

Martin Francis Scanlon
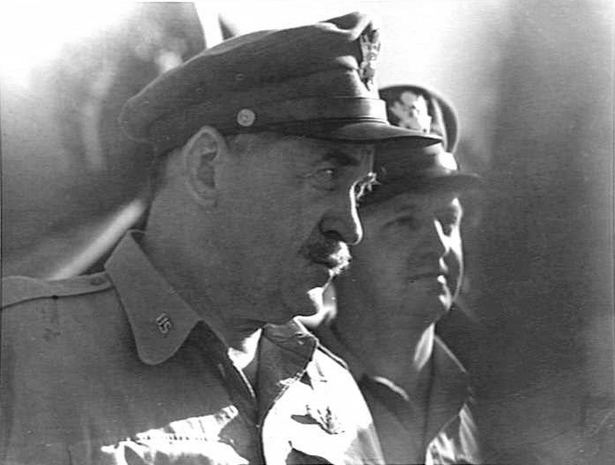
- Brigadier General Martin F. Scanlon
- Born: 11 August 1889; Scranton, Pennsylvania
- Died: 26 January 1980 (aged 90); Washington, DC
- Burial place: Arlington National Cemetery
- Military career
- Allegiance: United States
- Branch: United States Army Air Corps; United States Air Force
- Service years: 1912–1948
- Rank: Brigadier General
- Commands: 2d Aero Squadron; 38th Flying Training Wing; 36th Flying Training Wing
- Conflicts: Occupation of Veracruz; World War I: Meuse-Argonne Offensive; Occupation of the Rhineland; World War II: Kokoda Track campaign
- Awards: Distinguished Service Medal; Silver Star; Legion of Merit; Air Medal; Order of Polonia Restituta (Poland); Order of Saints Maurice and Lazarus (Italy)
- Other work: Director of export and vice president of Republic Aviation

Martin Francis Scanlon (11 August 1889 – 26 January 1980) was a general officer in the United States Air Force during World War II.

After joining the United States Army in 1912, Scanlon served on the Mexican border, and participated in the United States occupation of Veracruz. He joined the Aviation Section, U.S. Signal Corps, and during World War I served with the American Expeditionary Force on the Western Front as a pilot with the 91st Aero Squadron.

Between the wars he was an assistant military attaché in Rome and London, and was the military attaché in London from 1939 to 1941, during the first part of World War II. He was an Assistant Chief of the Air Staff from July 1941 to March 1942 at Headquarters, United States Army Air Forces, and then went to Australia as commanding general, Air Command No. 2, based at Townsville, Queensland. As such he was in charge of the air forces in New Guinea during the Kokoda Track campaign.

In September 1942, he returned to the United States where he commanded the 38th Flying Training Wing and the 36th Flying Training Wing. He retired from the United States Air Force in 1948, and was director of export and vice president of Republic Aviation until 1957.

== Early life ==
Martin Francis Scanlon was born in Scranton, Pennsylvania, on 11 August 1889. He attended the University of Pennsylvania from 1908 to 1909, and Cornell University from 1910 to 1911, before being commissioned in the United States Army as a second lieutenant in the Infantry on 24 April 1912. He initially served with the 7th Infantry Regiment, but transferred to the 19th Infantry Regiment. This regiment patrolled the border with Mexico from Fort Crockett, Texas. He participated in the United States occupation of Veracruz from May to October 1914, when the 19th Infantry returned to Galveston, Texas.

== World War I ==
Scanlon was at San Antonio, Texas, from September 1915 to March 1916, at which point he was assigned to the Aviation Section, U.S. Signal Corps. He was promoted to first lieutenant in the infantry on 1 July 1916, and in the Aviation Section on 28 October 1916, when he received his wings as a junior aviator in San Diego, California.

Scanlon assumed command of the 2d Aero Squadron, which was then flying seaplanes from Fort Mills on Corregidor Island in the Philippines. He was promoted to captain on 15 May 1917. He returned to the United States in November 1917, and was posted to Kelly Field and then Fort Worth, Texas for additional training.

He went to England, where he trained with the Royal Flying Corps from February to August 1918, with the rank of major from 7 June 1918. He joined the American Expeditionary Force on the Western Front in France, and was a pilot with the 91st Aero Squadron until September 1918, when he assumed command of Colombey-les-Belles aerodrome during the Meuse-Argonne Offensive. He was then air service commander of V Corps until March 1919. He was a student officer at the Army Artillery School at Trier, and was at the headquarters of the air service of the Third United States Army at Coblenz during the Occupation of the Rhineland.

== Between the wars ==
On returning to the United States in July 1919, he became commanding officer of Bolling Field, DC. He reverted to the rank of captain on 27 August 1919, but was transferred to the United States Army Air Service with the rank on major on 1 July 1920. In 1923, he attended the Air Corps Engineering School at McCook Field, Ohio. On graduation in August 1923, he was assigned to the National Guard Bureau in Washington, D.C., from 1 December 1923 to 1 May 1924.

Scanlon was the assistant military attaché for air at the United States Embassy in Rome from May 1924 until August 1927, when he returned to the United States to attend the Air Corps Tactical School at Langley Field, Virginia, from which he graduated in 1928, and then the United States Army Command and General Staff College, from which he graduated in 1929. He was then assistant military attaché for air at the United States Embassy in London.

After a four-year tour, he returned to the United States to become commander of the 15th Observation Squadron in 1933. He was the base commander of Bolling Field from January 1935 to January 1936, when he went back to England as the military attaché for air. He was promoted to the temporary rank of lieutenant colonel on 20 April 1935. This became substantive on 1 August 1935. On 26 August 1936, he was promoted to the temporary rank of colonel. He was special assistant to the United States Ambassador to the United Kingdom from April to September 1939, when he became the military attaché. He was promoted to brigadier general in the wartime Army of the United States on 1 October 1940.

== World War II ==
Scanlon was assigned to Headquarters, United States Army Air Forces as an Assistant Chief of the Air Staff from July 1941 to March 1942. He was then sent to Australia as commanding general, Air Command No. 2, based at Townsville, Queensland. As such he was in charge of the air forces in New Guinea during the Kokoda Track campaign. When Major General George Kenney took over as commander, Allied Forces in the South West Pacific Area from Lieutenant General George Brett in August 1942, he formed an unfavourable impression. He later recalled:

I had known Mike ever since 1918 and liked him immensely, but he was miscast in this job. He had been an air attaché in Rome and London for the best part of the last ten years, with a tour as intelligence officer in Washington, I don't know why they sent him up to New Guinea; he was not an operator and everyone from the kids on up knew it.

Kenney replaced Scanlon with Brigadier General Ennis Whitehead. Scanlon returned to the United States in September 1942, and became the commanding general of the 38th Flying Training Wing at Roswell Army Air Field in New Mexico, and then the 36th Flying Training Wing at Santa Ana Army Air Base in California. In August 1944, he became president of the Army Air Forces Evaluation Board in Hawaii. He reverted to his temporary rank of colonel on 10 April 1946, and retired with the rank of brigadier general on 21 February 1948.

== Later life ==
After retiring from the United States Air Force, Scanlon became the director of export and vice president of Republic Aviation, a position he held until his retirement in 1957. He was a member of the Army and Navy Club, Metropolitan Club, and the Burning Tree Club. He was a member of the Early Birds of Aviation and the Order of Daedalians. His decorations included the Distinguished Service Medal, the Silver Star, the Legion of Merit, the Bronze Star, the Air Medal, the Polish Order of Polonia Restituta and the Italian Order of Saints Maurice and Lazarus.

Scanlon died from heart failure at Walter Reed Army Hospital in Washington, D.C., on 26 January 1980.
