= Briegleb BG-7 =

American glider designed by William G. Briegleb

BG-7

General information
- Type: Glider
- National origin: United States
- Manufacturer: Sailplane Corporation of America
- Designer: William G. Briegleb
- Status: Production completed
- Number built: 3 completed aircraft, 20 kits

History
- First flight: 1940
- Developed from: Briegleb BG-6

The Briegleb BG-7 is an American strut-braced high-wing, single seat glider that was designed by William G. Briegleb and produced by the Sailplane Corporation of America as a completed aircraft and also as a kit.

== Design and development ==
The BG-7 was a development of the 1939 BG-6, with longer, semi-tapered wings of 40.25 ft (12.3 m) span, compared to the 32.35 ft (9.9 m) wing on the earlier model.

The BG-7 wing is made from wood structure, with two spars and covered in doped aircraft fabric. The wing is supported by dual struts. The fuselage is made from steel tube, again with fabric covering and the tail is metal and fabric. The longer wing created stability issues and many aircraft were subsequently modified by either lengthening the tail to increase the tail arm or enlarging the vertical fin. Cockpit modifications were also common.

Three BG-7s were completed by the factory and a further 20 kits were sold. The type was never certified and most were amateur-built from factory kits.

== Operational history ==
In 1952 Betsy Woodward Proudfit, flying a BG-7, set the feminine speed record for the 100 km (62 mi) triangle, at 28.64 mph (46.09 km/h). The record stood for eighteen years.

In March 2011 there were still 2 BG-7s on the Federal Aviation Administration register.

== Specifications (BG-7) ==
Data from Sailplane Directory and Soaring

General characteristics

- Crew: one
- Wingspan: 40.25 ft (12.27 m)
- Wing area: 123 sq ft (11.4 m^{2})
- Aspect ratio: 13.1:1
- Airfoil: NACA 4412
- Empty weight: 250 lb (113 kg)
- Gross weight: 500 lb (227 kg)

Performance

- Maximum glide ratio: 20:1 at 40 mph (64 km/h)
- Rate of sink: 174 ft/min (0.88 m/s) at 36 mph (58 km/h)
- Wing loading: 4.1 lb/sq ft (20 kg/m^{2})

== See also ==
- Briegleb El Mirage Airfield
- List of gliders
