= El Mirage, California =

Unincorporated community in California, United States

- Unincorporated community
- Location within California Location within the United States
- Coordinates: 34°36′08″N 117°37′52″W
- Country: United States
- State: California
- County: San Bernardino
- Elevation: 2,913 ft (888 m)
- Time zone: UTC-8 (Pacific (PST))
  - Summer (DST): UTC-7 (PDT)
- Area codes: 442/760
- GNIS feature ID: 252884

El Mirage (corruption of El Miraje, Spanish for "The Mirage") is an unincorporated community in the western Victor Valley of the Mojave Desert, within San Bernardino County, California.

El Mirage is next to the El Mirage Lake, a dry lake bed, and 12.5 miles (20.1 km) northwest of Adelanto.

== Climate ==
El Mirage has a hot desert climate (BS) typical of Southern California's interior with hot, dry summers and cool winters.

Climate data for El Mirage, California, 1991–2020 normals, extremes 1971–2010
Month	Jan	Feb	Mar	Apr	May	Jun	Jul	Aug	Sep	Oct	Nov	Dec	Year
Record high °F (°C)	76 (24)	82 (28)	88 (31)	96 (36)	105 (41)	110 (43)	112 (44)	108 (42)	106 (41)	98 (37)	87 (31)	80 (27)	112 (44)
Mean daily maximum °F (°C)	57.4 (14.1)	60.1 (15.6)	65.6 (18.7)	72.3 (22.4)	80.5 (26.9)	91.2 (32.9)	98.0 (36.7)	97.3 (36.3)	90.1 (32.3)	78.2 (25.7)	66.0 (18.9)	56.1 (13.4)	76.1 (24.5)
Daily mean °F (°C)	44.7 (7.1)	47.3 (8.5)	52.7 (11.5)	57.7 (14.3)	65.4 (18.6)	74.6 (23.7)	80.8 (27.1)	80.0 (26.7)	73.3 (22.9)	62.2 (16.8)	51.8 (11.0)	43.3 (6.3)	61.2 (16.2)
Mean daily minimum °F (°C)	32.0 (0.0)	34.6 (1.4)	39.8 (4.3)	43.1 (6.2)	50.4 (10.2)	57.9 (14.4)	63.7 (17.6)	62.7 (17.1)	56.5 (13.6)	46.2 (7.9)	37.6 (3.1)	30.5 (−0.8)	46.3 (7.9)
Record low °F (°C)	3 (−16)	5 (−15)	18 (−8)	23 (−5)	29 (−2)	32 (0)	41 (5)	41 (5)	33 (1)	14 (−10)	14 (−10)	1 (−17)	1 (−17)
Average precipitation inches (mm)	0.88 (22)	1.06 (27)	0.61 (15)	0.27 (6.9)	0.20 (5.1)	0.06 (1.5)	0.21 (5.3)	0.16 (4.1)	0.28 (7.1)	0.43 (11)	0.29 (7.4)	0.96 (24)	5.41 (136.4)
Average snowfall inches (cm)	0.6 (1.5)	0.2 (0.51)	0.1 (0.25)	0.0 (0.0)	0.0 (0.0)	0.0 (0.0)	0.0 (0.0)	0.0 (0.0)	0.0 (0.0)	0.0 (0.0)	0.0 (0.0)	0.2 (0.51)	1.1 (2.77)
Average precipitation days (≥ 0.01 in)	4.8	5.6	4.5	2.2	0.9	0.4	1.0	0.8	1.4	1.6	2.1	3.9	29.2
Average snowy days (≥ 0.1 in)	0.2	0.2	0.2	0.0	0.0	0.0	0.0	0.0	0.0	0.0	0.1	0.1	0.8
Source 1: NOAA
Source 2: National Weather Service

== Education ==
El Mirage School, a K-8 Campus, is operated by neighboring Adelanto Elementary School District. Students in the upper grades attend High School in Victor Valley Union High School District, including Adelanto High School.

== Filmings ==
The music video for "California Love" by Tupac Shakur and Dr. Dre was filmed in El Mirage in 1995. The music video for the song "Dilly" by Band of Horses was filmed in 2010 at Murphy's Bar and Grill, now permanently closed. The music video for "What I've Done" by Linkin Park was filmed in the El Mirage Dry Lake in the Mojave Desert in March 2007

== See also ==
- Populated places in the Mojave Desert
- Mirage Airfield
- Grey Butte Auxiliary Airfield
