= 36th Flying Training Wing =

Wing of the United States Army Air Forces

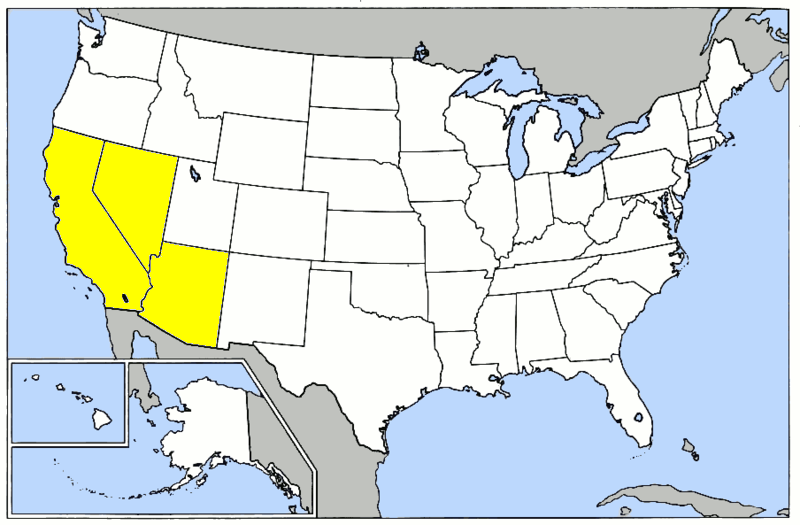
- Locations of airfields controlled by the 36th Flying Training Wing
- Active: 1942–1945
- Country: United States
- Branch: United States Army Air Forces
- Type: Command and Control
- Role: Training
- Part of: Army Air Forces Training Command
- Engagements: World War II: World War II American Theater

Commanders
- Notable commanders: BG Martinus Stenseth, 8 January 1943; BG Martin F. Scanlop, 13 January 1944; Col Tom J. Cunningham, 11 July 1944; Lt Col Arthur S. Blum Jr., 4 Dec 1944 – Unknown

The 36th Flying Training Wing was a wing of the United States Army Air Forces. It was last assigned to the Western Flying Training Command, and was disbanded on 1 November 1945 at Santa Ana Army Air Base, California.

The wing directed flying training units of the Army Air Forces Training Command. Headquartered at Victorville Army Airfield, California for most of its operational service, it controlled contract pilot schools primarily in California and other western states.

There is no lineage between the current United States Air Force 36th Wing, established on 17 June 1948 at Howard Field, Canal Zone, and this organization.

== History ==
Until 1939, the Army Air Corps provided all flying training with military instructor pilots. Beginning in 1939, it contracted with nine civilian flying schools to provide primary flight training. Primary training consisted of a three-month course of 65 hours of flying instruction. As the United States prepared to enter World War II by expanding its number of flying squadrons, the number of contract primary schools increased.

According to the contract, the government supplied students with training aircraft, flying clothes, textbooks, and equipment. The Air Corps also put a detachment at each school to supervise training. The schools furnished instructors, training sites and facilities, aircraft maintenance, quarters, and mess halls. From the Air Corps, schools received a flat fee of $1,170 for each graduate and $18 per flying hour for students eliminated from training. The Primary Pilot Training used Boeing PT-17 or Fairchild PT-19 two-seater single-engine training aircraft. Also, the wing controlled specialized schools for Liaison Pilots using the Stinson L-5 Sentinel, and Women Airforce Service Pilots (WASP) primary training was conducted exclusively at Avenger Field, Sweetwater, Texas.

Following the fall of France in 1940, the Air Corps upped its pilot production goal to 7,000 per year. To meet that goal, the Air Corps increased the capacity of its schools and added more contract primary schools.

The contract primary pilot schools ended their operations in October 1945.

=== Lineage ===
- Established as 36th Flying Training Wing on 17 December 1942.

Activated on 8 January 1943
Disbanded on 1 November 1945

=== Assignments ===
- Army Air Forces West Coast Training (later, AAF Western Flying Training) Command, 8 January 1943 – 1 November 1945.

=== Stations ===
- Victorville Army Airfield, California, 8 January 1945
- Santa Ana Army Air Base, California, 21 December 1943 – 1 November 1945.

=== Training aircraft ===
The primary aircraft used were Boeing-Stearman PT-17 and Fairchild PT-19 twin-seat, single engine trainers. However other aircraft were used at several schools. Those were:.

- Boeing-Stearman PT-13
- Boeing-Stearman PT-18
- Ryan PT-22
- Boeing-Stearman PT-27

The PT-13, PT-18 and PT-27s were the basic Boeing-Stearman with different engines than the PT-17, with varying horsepower ratings. The PT-19 also could have the student pilot covered with a hood for "Blind" instrument flying training. Due to the proximity of Ryan Aircraft Company in San Diego, it's PT-22 trainer was also purchased and provided to several schools in California

=== Assigned schools ===
Falcon Field, Mesa, Arizona
AAF Contract Pilot School (Primary)
15th Flying Training Detachment
Opened: June 1941, Closed: May 1945 (PT-17)
Operated by: undetermined contractor; provided RAF Training

Gary Field, Riverside, California
AAF Contract Pilot School (Primary)
10th Flying Training Detachment
Opened: June 1942, Closed: August 1944 (PT-17, PT-19)
Operated by: Morton Mfg. Company/Morton Air Academy, Blythe, California; had two auxiliary airfields

Indian Springs Airport, Nevada
AAF Flexible Gunnery School
Opened 14 January 1942, Closed 1945. No Aircraft assigned

Kingman Army Airfield, Arizona
AAF Flexible Gunnery School
Opened: January 1942, Closed: November 1945 (AT-6, AT-11, AT-18, P-39Q)
Operated P-39Q Airacobras as air-to-air gunnery targets

Las Vegas Army Airfield, Nevada
AAF Flexible Gunnery School
Opened: September 1941, Closed: December 1945 (AT-6, AT-11, B-10)
Reactivated April 1950 as Nellis Air Force Base

Lone Pine Airport, Lone Pine, California
AAF Contract Pilot School (Primary)
Opened: April 1942, Closed: June 1944 (PT-13, PT-27)
Operated by: Lone Pine Academy

Ontario Army Airfield, Ontario, California
AAF Contract Pilot School (Primary)
7th Flying Training Detachment
Opened: June 1940, Closed: November 1944 (PT-13, PT-18)
Facility shared with Fourth Air Force; Operated by: undetermined contractor. Contract flying school closed November 1944. Was also used by the USAAF for basic flying training and for P-38 combat training. P-38 training was conducted by 443rd Air Base Unit.

Oxnard Airfield, Oxnard, California
AAF Contract Pilot School (Primary)
14th Flying Training Detachment
Opened: September 1940, Closed: June 1944 (PT-17)
Operated by: Mira Loma Flight Academy, Oxnard, California; also used by Fourth Air Force

Twenty Nine Palms Army Airfield, Twenty-Nine Palms, California
AAF Ground Training Detachment
17th Flying Training Detachment/6th Glider Training Detachment
Opened: January 1942, Closed: April 1944 (PT-17, PT-27)
Operated by: Twenty-Nine Palms Air Academy; transferred to United States Navy, June 1944

War Eagle Field, Lancaster, California
AAF Contract Pilot School (Primary)
14th Flying Training Detachment
Opened: July 1942, Closed: July 1945 (PT-13)
Was USAAF Basic flying school from June 1942 – June 1944; Operated by: Polaris Flight Academy, July 1944 – August 1945

Yucca Army Airfield, Arizona
AAF Flexible Gunnery School
Opened December 1941, closed December 1945, no aircraft permanently assigned
Satellite of Kingman Army Airfield

== See also ==
- Army Air Forces Training Command
- Other Training Command Primary Flight Training Wings:

29th Flying Training Wing (World War II) Eastern Flying Training Command
31st Flying Training Wing (World War II) Central Flying Training Command

- Other Western Flying Training Command Flight Training Wings:

35th Flying Training Wing (World War II) Basic/Advanced Flight Training (California)
37th Flying Training Wing (World War II) Basic/Advanced Flight Training (Arizona)
38th Flying Training Wing (World War II) Bombardier and Specialized 2/4-Engine Training
81st Flying Training Wing (World War II) Classification/Preflight Unit

- Desert Training Center
- Victorville Army Airfield auxiliary fields
