= Oxnard Air Force Base =

Former United States Air Force base

Oxnard Air Force Base
- Part of Air Defense Command
- Camarillo, California
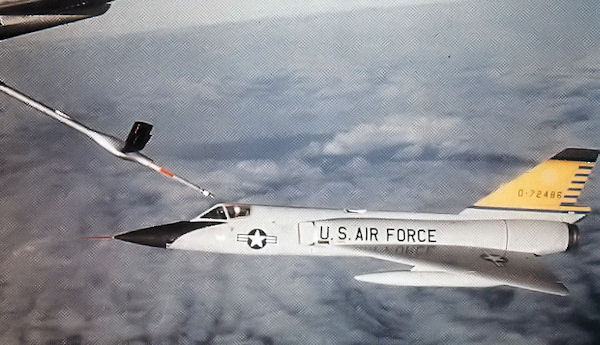
- Convair F-106A-90-CO Delta Dart 57-2486 437th Fighter-Interceptor Squadron.

Site information
- Type: Air Force Base

Location
- Coordinates: 34°12′50″N 119°05′40″W

Site history
- Built: 1940
- In use: 1940-1945; 1951-1970

Oxnard Air Force Base is a former United States Air Force base, in the city of Camarillo, California.

== History ==
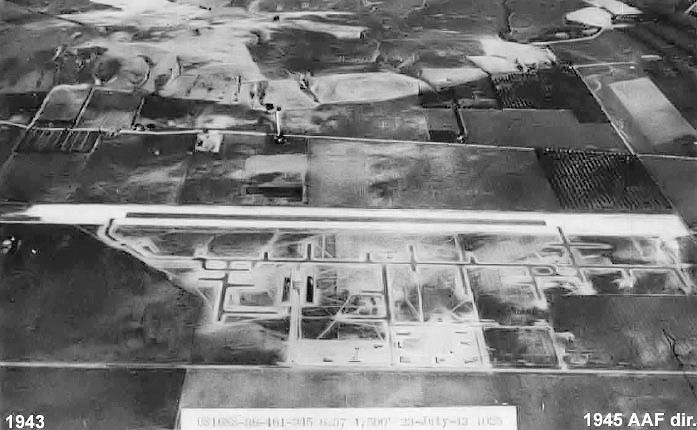
Oxnard Army Airfield in 1943 during World War II

Camarillo Airport was established in 1942, when the California State Highway Department built an auxiliary landing field with a 5,000 ft (1,500 m) runway. During World War II the 36th Flying Training Wing (U.S. Army Air Forces) supervised contractors training pilots at the airfield. In 1951 The runway was extended to 8,000 ft (2,400 m) to accommodate what by then had developed into Oxnard Air Force Base. In the 1950s, the base was home to the 354th Fighter Interceptor Squadron. The base fielded F101 Voodoo interceptors. In the mid-1960s they were replaced, when the base received 17 new F-106 Delta Darts. The base was highlighted in U.S. Air Force Training Film "Nuclear Attack Preparedness Procedures: Survive to Fight".

On January 1, 1970, Oxnard AFB was deactivated and the base became surplus property. Oxnard had 99 officers and 990 enlisted personnel before its closing. The last commanding officer of the 414th Fighter Group was Colonel Paul D. Cofer.
