= Southern California Logistics Airport =

San Bernardino County airport

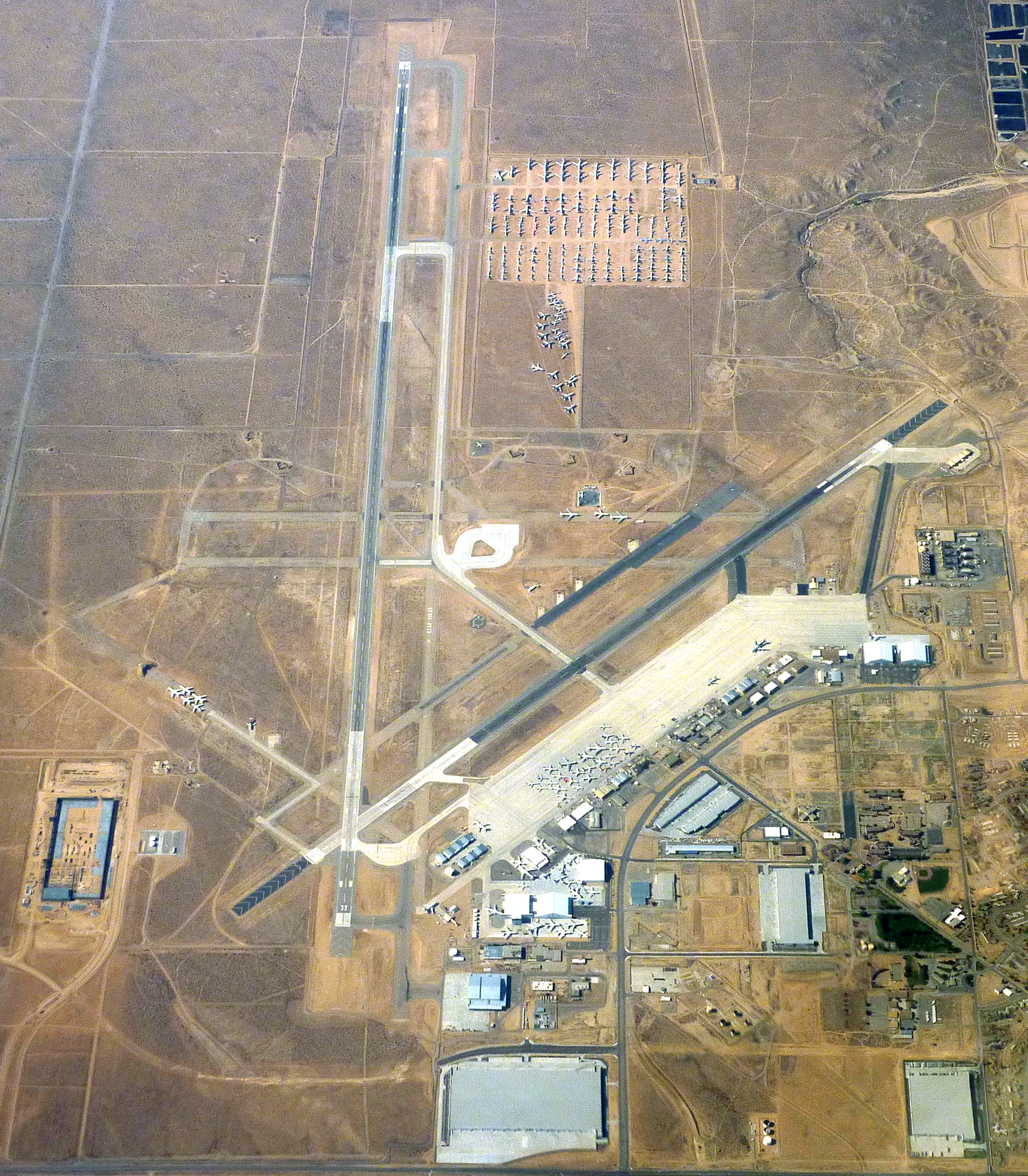
- Aerial photo taken July 2009
- IATA: VCV; ICAO: KVCV

Summary
- Airport type: Public
- Operator: United States Air Force
- Serves: Victorville, California
- Elevation AMSL: 2,885 ft (879 m)
- Coordinates: 34°35′51″N 117°22′59″W
- Website: Official website

Maps
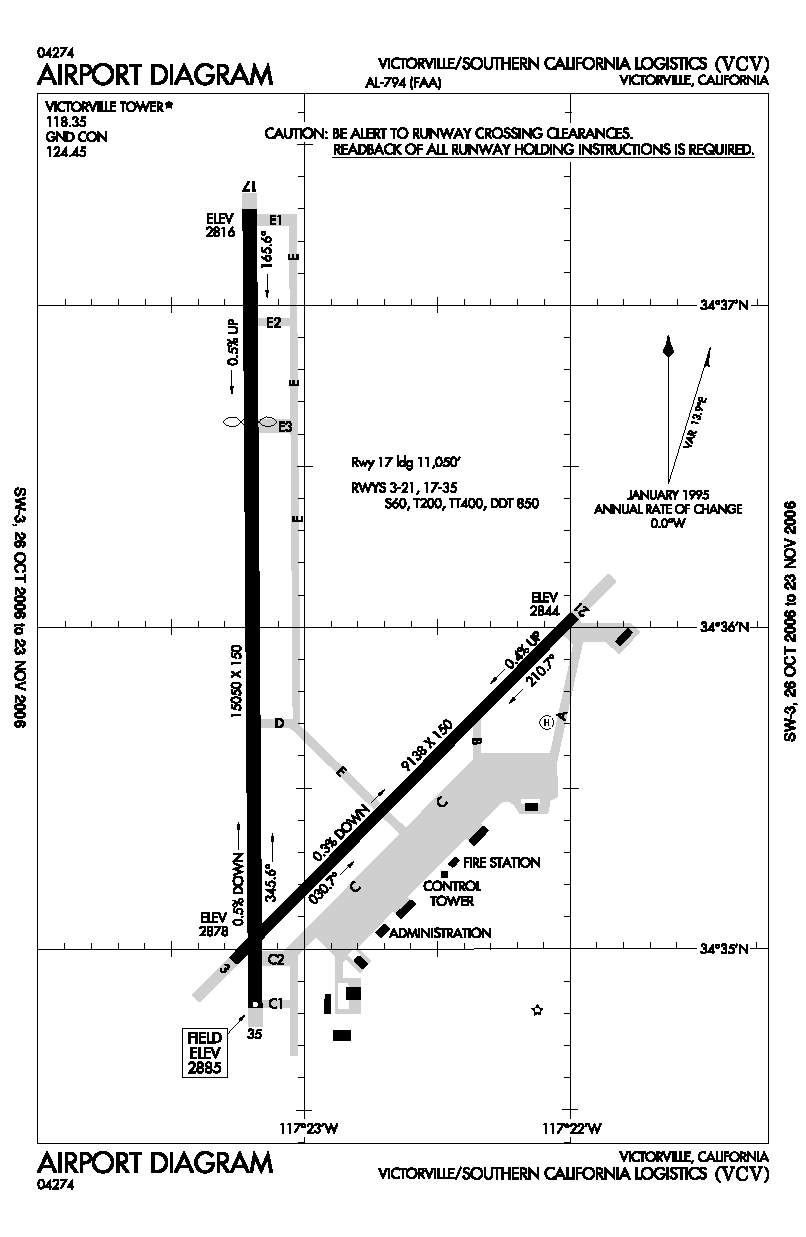
- FAA airport diagram
- Interactive map of Southern California Logistics Airport

Runways
Direction	Length		Surface
Direction	ft	m	Surface
17/35	15,050	4,590	Asphalt/concrete
03/21	9,138	2,785	Asphalt/concrete

Southern California Logistics Airport (IATA: VCV, ICAO: KVCV, FAA LID: VCV), also known as Victorville Airport, is a public airport located in the city of Victorville in San Bernardino County, California, approximately 50 mi (80 km) north of San Bernardino. Prior to its civil usage, the facility was George Air Force Base, from 1941 to 1992 a United States Air Force flight training facility.

The airport is home to Southern California Aviation, a large transitional facility for commercial aircraft.

As a logistics airport, it is designed for business, military, and freight use. There are no commercial passenger services at this facility except for FBO and charter flights.

== Facilities ==
Southern California Logistics Airport (SCLA) covers 2,300 acres (930 ha) and has two runways:

- Runway 17/35: 13,051 ft × 150 ft (3,978 m × 46 m), surface: asphalt/concrete
- Runway 03/21: 9,138 ft × 150 ft (2,785 m × 46 m), surface: asphalt/concrete

Southern California Logistics Center, immediately adjacent to SCLA, offers a wide variety of new warehouse and distribution facilities, ranging from 2,000 sq ft (190 m^{2}) to over 1,000,000 sq ft (93,000 m^{2}).

The SCLA Military Operations in Urban Terrain (MOUT) facility offers urban warfare training, and has served over 15,000 U.S. military personnel during the past ten years.

== History ==
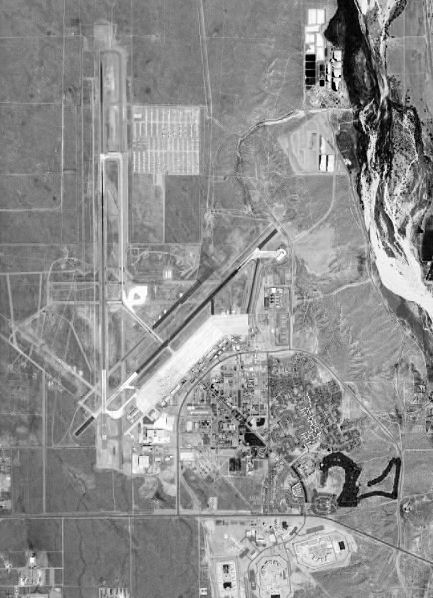
George Air Force Base in 1994

The federal government was responsible for helping the Victor Valley recover from the closure of George Air Force Base in 1992. The conversion of the former George Air Force Base to SCLA was designed to provide major corporations with logistics needs, access to a global intermodal logistics gateway to the Western United States. Located near Interstate 15 in California's Victor Valley, the 5,000-acre (2,000 ha) complete intermodal business complex is approximately 20 mi (32 km) north of downtown San Bernardino, and 23 mi (37 km) north of San Bernardino International Airport.

In July 2000, SCLA received foreign trade zone status from the United States Department of Commerce. The designation was intended to make it much easier for the Victor Valley Economic Development Authority to convince international carriers to use the airport as a base for shipping foreign products to Southern California. During that same period, the Department of Transportation approved a $4.9 million grant for the SCLA to extend its main runway from 10,050 ft (3,060 m) to 15,050 ft (4,590 m) to accommodate international jet transports. The airport authority required the 5,000 ft (1,500 m) extension to ensure that cargo planes could depart fully loaded in summer heat. The longer runway was also required for the efficient use of the facility as the main transportation hub for the 70,000 troops a year traveling to and from the Army National Training Center at Fort Irwin. At 15,050 ft (4,590 m), SCLA's runway 17/35 was the second longest public-use runway in the United States, surpassed only by that of the Denver International Airport 16,000 ft (4,900 m) runway 16R/34L. The runway was shortened in 2022 to 13,051 feet.

The fiscal year 2002 military spending bill earmarked US$1.3 million to allow the U.S. Army to continue using the SCLA to transport troops en route to training exercises at Fort Irwin. The airport has proven to be one of the most efficient and safest locations for travel to and from the Army's National Training Center for the troops who rotate through each year. Company D of the 158th Aviation Regiment is a general support aviation company that moved in under a five-year contract the Army signed with SCLA and the city of Victorville. The unit is part of the 244th Aviation Brigade of Fort Sheridan, Illinois.

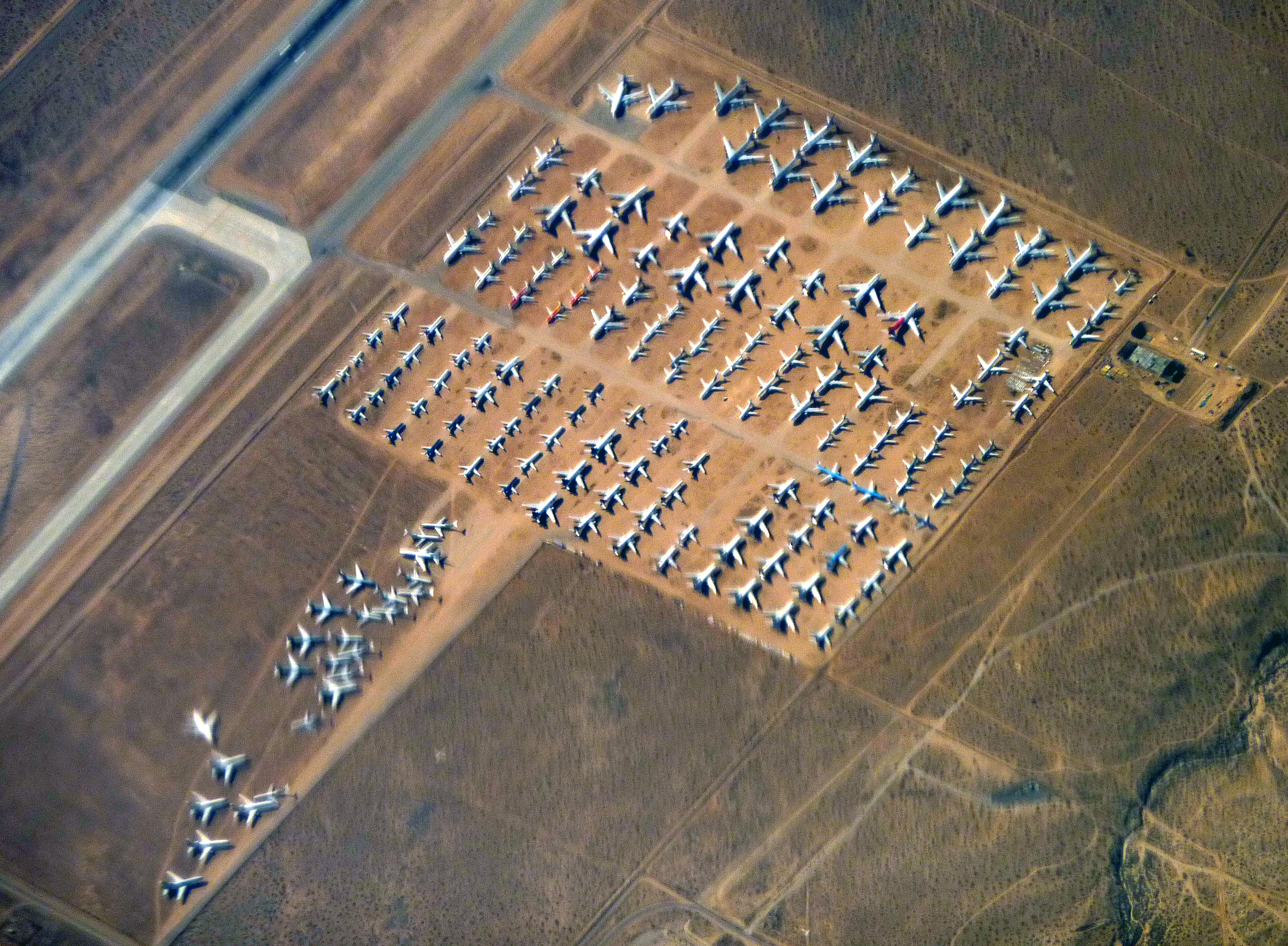
Victorville's aircraft boneyard

In response to the sharp drop in air travel during the COVID-19 pandemic, several airlines contracted with aircraft boneyard operator ComAv to store aircraft and to keep them clean and in working order while they are in storage. By late March 2020, about 275 airliners were in storage at SCLA. As of 30 March 2020, Southwest Airlines had parked 50 active Boeing 737-700 aircraft at Victorville. The Australian airline Qantas began to move its entire Airbus A380 fleet into storage at the facility in July 2020, due to the lack of international demand for flights.

== Trivia ==
In late 2006, SCLA became home to Air Tanker 910, a heavily modified McDonnell Douglas DC-10, which is on contract to the California Department of Forestry (CALFIRE). Tanker 910 used SCLA as its re-loading base for fires occurring anywhere in California. SCLA has since stopped its servicing for such tankers like the DC-10 and the Calfire Grumman S-2 Tracker with most refueling points for Southern California wildfires being at San Bernardino International Airport or the former Norton Air Force Base and Mojave Air and Space Port.

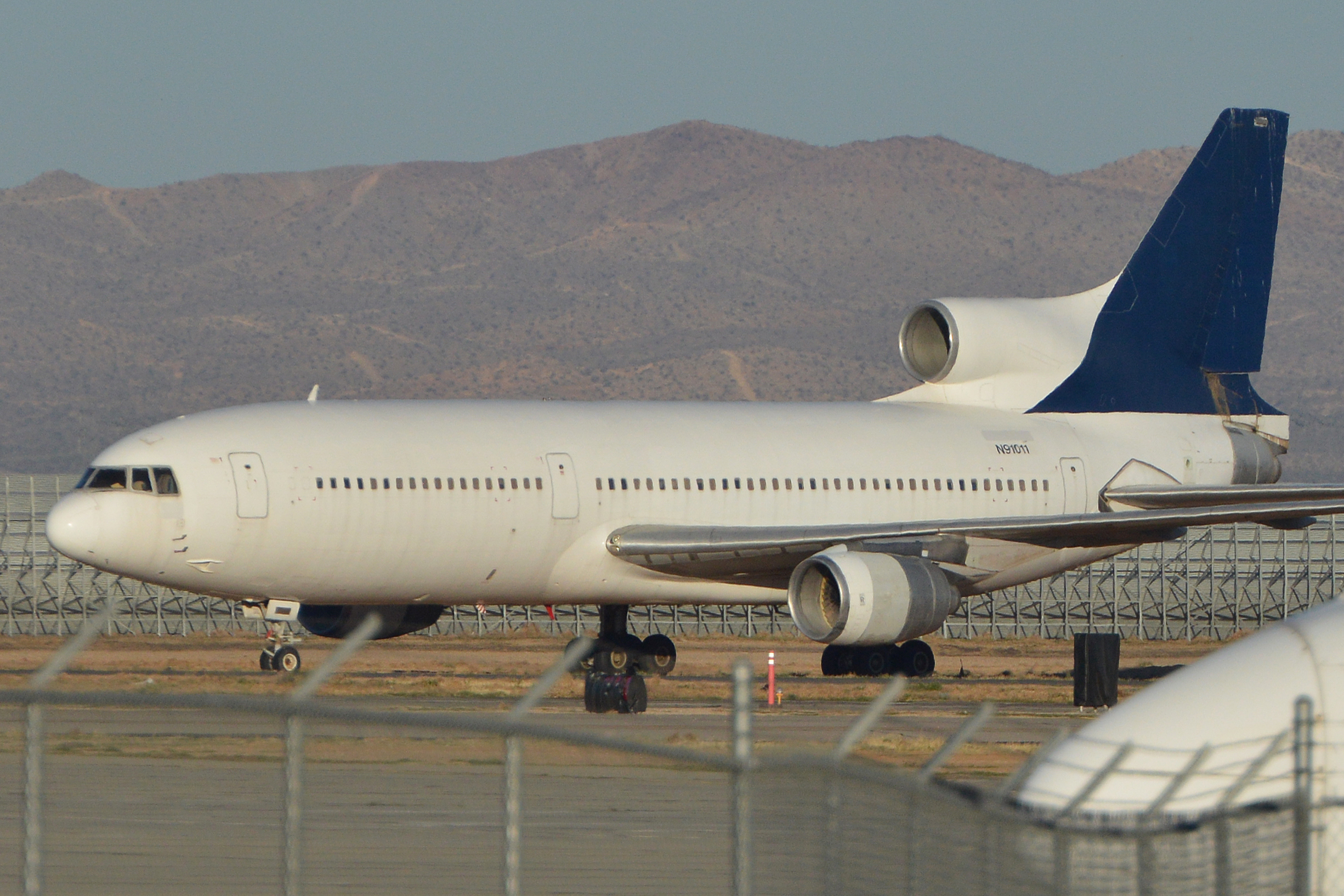
Lockheed L-1011 TriStar in storage at the airport

The 2007 Autonomous Vehicle Competition took place on the former George Air Force Base. DARPA selected the location because its network of urban roads best simulated the type of terrain American forces operate in when deployed overseas.

N118UA, United Airlines' "Friend Ship" 747-400, arrived at the boneyard on November 9, 2017, to be stored. It was the final United 747 to carry passengers, flying its final revenue flight on November 7, 2017.

On November 2, 2018, the Presidential Plane of Mexico named TP-01 (registered as XC-MEX) of the Mexican Air Force arrived here to be sold off to its new owner by the order of New President of Mexico Andrés Manuel López Obrador.

On March 27, 2019, the first of two Boeing 747-8i (N894BA) flew from SCLA to Lackland Air Force Base in San Antonio, Texas, for conversion into a presidential transport VC-25B. It was one of two built for the Russian airline Transaero, but the airline went bankrupt before taking delivery of the 747s. The cost of converting both aircraft is estimated to be $4.68B.

In 2019, Southwest Airlines used the airport to store its fleet of Boeing 737 MAX after the airplane was grounded by the Federal Aviation Administration (FAA).

On 14 February 2020, the Guinness World Record for the longest-distance wheelie in an airplane was set in a Cessna 172 on the airport's runway 17. The pilot kept the plane's nose wheel from touching the asphalt surface for a distance of 14,319 feet (4,364 m).

In response to the sharp drop in air travel during the COVID-19 pandemic, several airlines contracted with aircraft boneyard operator ComAv to store aircraft and to keep them clean and in working order while they are in storage. By late March 2020, about 275 airliners were in storage at SCLA. As of 30 March 2020, Southwest Airlines had parked 50 active Boeing 737-700 aircraft at Victorville. The Australian airline Qantas began to move its entire Airbus A380 fleet into storage at the facility in July 2020, due to the lack of international demand for flights.

== Aircraft storage ==
Aircraft maintenance and storage company ComAv Technical Services operates a 240-acre (97 ha) open storage facility at SCLA with a capacity of over 500 aircraft, plus hangars that can be used to maintain several more. The dry desert environment at SCLA is conducive to long-term preservation of aircraft.

=== Automobile storage ===
In the aftermath of the 2015 emissions scandal, German automaker Volkswagen leased 134 acres (54 ha) of land at the SCLA to store 21,000 cars it had reacquired from customers.

== Accidents and incidents ==
- 7 June 2001: The copilot of a Learjet 24A, registration number N805NA, inadvertently induced a lateral oscillation and lost directional control of the aircraft during touch-and-go landing practice with the yaw damper disengaged. After dragging the right-hand tip tank on the runway, the aircraft landed hard, collapsing the main landing gear and sliding off the runway. The aircraft was substantially damaged but its three occupants were not injured. The accident was attributed to the copilot's inadvertent loss of control and the pilot in command's failure to adequately supervise the copilot.

== See also ==
- Victorville Army Airfield auxiliary fields
