= Sailplane Corporation of America =

The Sailplane Corporation of America was a US manufacturer of sailplanes founded by Gus Briegleb at a former US Army Airfield at El Mirage Dry Lake in California to market kits and plans of his own designs. The firm's greatest success was the Briegleb BG 12 wooden sailplane, but it also sold plans for Briegleb's earlier, wartime designs.

== Aircraft ==
- Briegleb BG-6
- Briegleb BG-7
- Briegleb BG-8
- Briegleb BG 12

== See also ==
- Briegleb El Mirage Airfield
