= Kramer Hills, California =

Unincorporated community in California, United States

Kramer Hills
- Unincorporated community
- Location in California Kramer Hills (the United States)
- Coordinates: 34°55′15″N 117°28′07″W
- Country: United States
- State: California
- County: San Bernardino
- Elevation: 2,740 ft (835 m)
- Time zone: UTC−8 (Pacific Time Zone)
  - Summer (DST): UTC−7 (PDT)
- Area codes: 442/760
- FIPS code: 06-38905
- GNIS feature ID: 252916

Kramer Hills is an unincorporated community in San Bernardino County, California, United States. Kramer Hills is 6.4 miles (10.3 km) southeast of Kramer Junction and 26 miles (42 km) west of Barstow.

The small mining camp of Kramer Hill was founded around 1885 after a nearby copper discovery, but was short-lived. Later discoveries of gold and copper revived interest, but the only substantial development was at the Herkelrath gold mine around 1926. Actual production (if any) is unknown, but many claims were staked and much prospecting done.

Nearby is the World War II Hawes Auxiliary Airfield.
