= George Air Force Base =

Former US Air Force base in Victorville, California

- Victorville, California
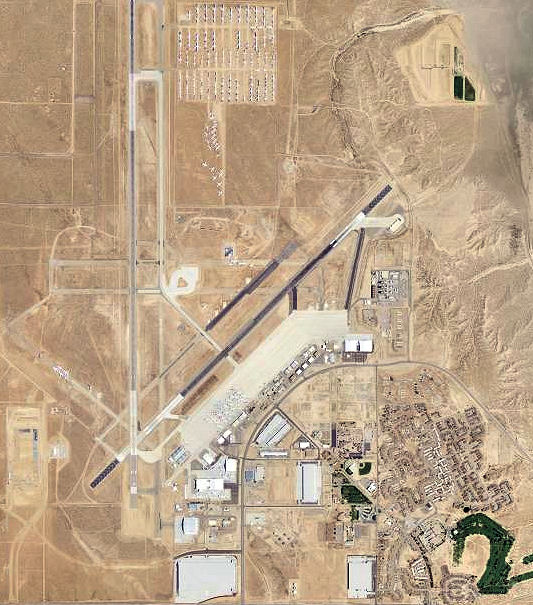
- 2006 USGS airphoto

Site information
- Type: Air Force Base
- Controlled by: United States Army Air Forces; United States Air Force
- Condition: Civilian Airport, private ownership

Location
- Coordinates: 34°35′41″N 117°23′03″W

Site history
- Built: 1941
- In use: 1941–1992
- Battles/wars: World War II Korean War Vietnam War 1991 Gulf War (Defense of Saudi Arabia; Liberation of Kuwait)

George Air Force Base was a United States Air Force base located within the city limits, 8 miles northwest, of central Victorville, California, about 75 miles northeast of Los Angeles, California.

Established by the United States Army Air Corps as an Advanced Flying School in June 1941, it was closed at the end of World War II. It was again activated as a training base by the United States Air Force with the outbreak of the Korean War in November 1950. It remained a training base throughout the Cold War and in the immediate post-Cold War period, primarily for the Tactical Air Command (TAC) and later the Air Combat Command (ACC), training USAF, NATO and other Allied pilots and weapon systems officers in front-line fighter aircraft until being closed in 1993.

The base was closed at the end of the Cold War following a decision by the 1988 Base Realignment and Closure (BRAC) Commission and is now the site of the Southern California Logistics Airport. Since 2009, the California Air National Guard's 196th Reconnaissance Squadron (96 RS) has operated an MQ-1 Predator Remotely Piloted Aircraft (RPA) training facility at the site.

== History ==
George Air Force Base was named in honor of Brigadier General Harold Huston George. He was a World War I fighter ace, serving with the 185th and 139th Aero Squadrons. At the beginning of World War II he was assigned to the V Interceptor Command, Far East Air Force in the Philippines. There, he directed air operations in defense of the fortified islands in Manila Bay. Withdrawn to Australia, he died on 29 April 1942 in an aircraft accident near Darwin, Northern Territory.

A Curtiss P-40 of the 49th Fighter Group, piloted by Lt. Bob Hazard, taking off as second of two P-40s from Twenty-Seven Mile Field, SE of Darwin, Australia, lost directional control in the propwash of the lead fighter, striking a recently arrived Lockheed C-40 parked next to airstrip, killing General Harold H. George, Time-Life war correspondent Melvin Jacoby, and base personnel 2nd Lt. Robert D. Jasper, who were standing next to the Lockheed. A number of others received injuries, but the P-40 pilot survived. George Air Force Base was named for the late general in June 1950.

=== World War II ===
Victorville Army Air Field, 1944 Classbook

In April 1940, civic leaders from Victorville, California approached the United States Army with a proposal to develop an airfield in the High Mojave Desert. They promoted the area's 360-days per year of sunny weather, abundance of wide-open spaces, and the availability of services from the nearby towns of both Victorville and Adelanto. In 1941, as part of the buildup of the United States Army Air Corps prior to the entry of the United States into World War II, an agreement was made, and construction of the 2,200-acre base, called Victorville Army Air Field at the time, commenced with a groundbreaking ceremony on 12 July 1941.

Runway construction consisted of a four runway configuration along with seven hangars. Known sub-bases and auxiliaries of Victorville AAF were:

- Hawes Auxiliary Airfield (No 1) 34°55′30″N 117°22′27″W (Abandoned)
- Helendale Auxiliary Airfield (No 2) 34°49′40″N 117°18′18″W (Now home to a test facility operated by Lockheed Skunk Works)
- Mirage Auxiliary Airfield (No 3) 34°37′29″N 117°35′59″W
- Grey Butte Auxiliary Airfield (No 4) 34°34′00″N 117°40′25″W
- To support the airfields the Silver Peak Light Annex was built.
- To support the airfields the Victorville Precision Bombing range was built.

In addition to the airfield, the building of a large support base was carried out with barracks, various administrative buildings, maintenance shops and hangars.

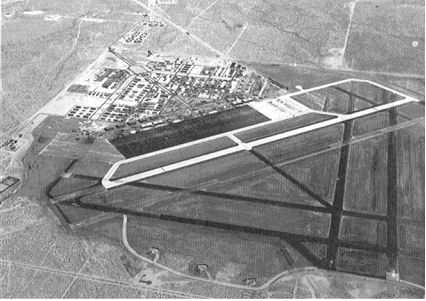
Victorville Army Air Field, looking southeast, August 1943.

The station facility consisted of a large number of buildings based on standardized plans and architectural drawings, with the buildings designed to be the "cheapest, temporary character with structural stability only sufficient to meet the needs of the service which the structure is intended to fulfill during the period of its contemplated war use" was underway. To conserve critical materials, most facilities were constructed of wood, concrete, brick, gypsum board and concrete asbestos. Metal was sparsely used.

The station was designed to be nearly self-sufficient, with hangars, barracks, warehouses, hospitals, dental clinics, dining halls, and maintenance shops. There were libraries, social clubs for officers and enlisted men, and stores to buy necessities. With over 250 buildings, together with complete water, sewer, electric and gas utilities, the airfield served over 4,000 military personnel.

Training began in February 1942 on Curtiss AT-9's, T-6 Texan's, and AT-17's for pilots, and AT-11's and BT-13 Valiant's for bombardiers. The army operated an advanced twin-engine pilot training school at the field, its graduates generally flying C-47 Skytrain transports, B-25 Mitchell or B-26 Marauder medium bombers. The school also trained replacement crew members in the B-25 and B-26. The first class of flying cadets graduated on 24 April 1942.

In addition to the pilot training, a USAAF Bombardier training school was operated. The 516th, 517th, and 518th Twin-Engine Flying Training Squadrons were the flying squadrons. Bombardier training was conducted by the 519th, 520th, 521st, and 522d Bombardier Training Squadrons. In April 1942, these training squadrons were organized under the 36th Flying Training Wing, which became the main flying operations command and control organization. The first bombardier classes had to practice their target runs at nearby Muroc Army Air Field, later renamed Edwards Air Force Base. The pilots used Highway 395 as a landmark and guide north to the bombing range.

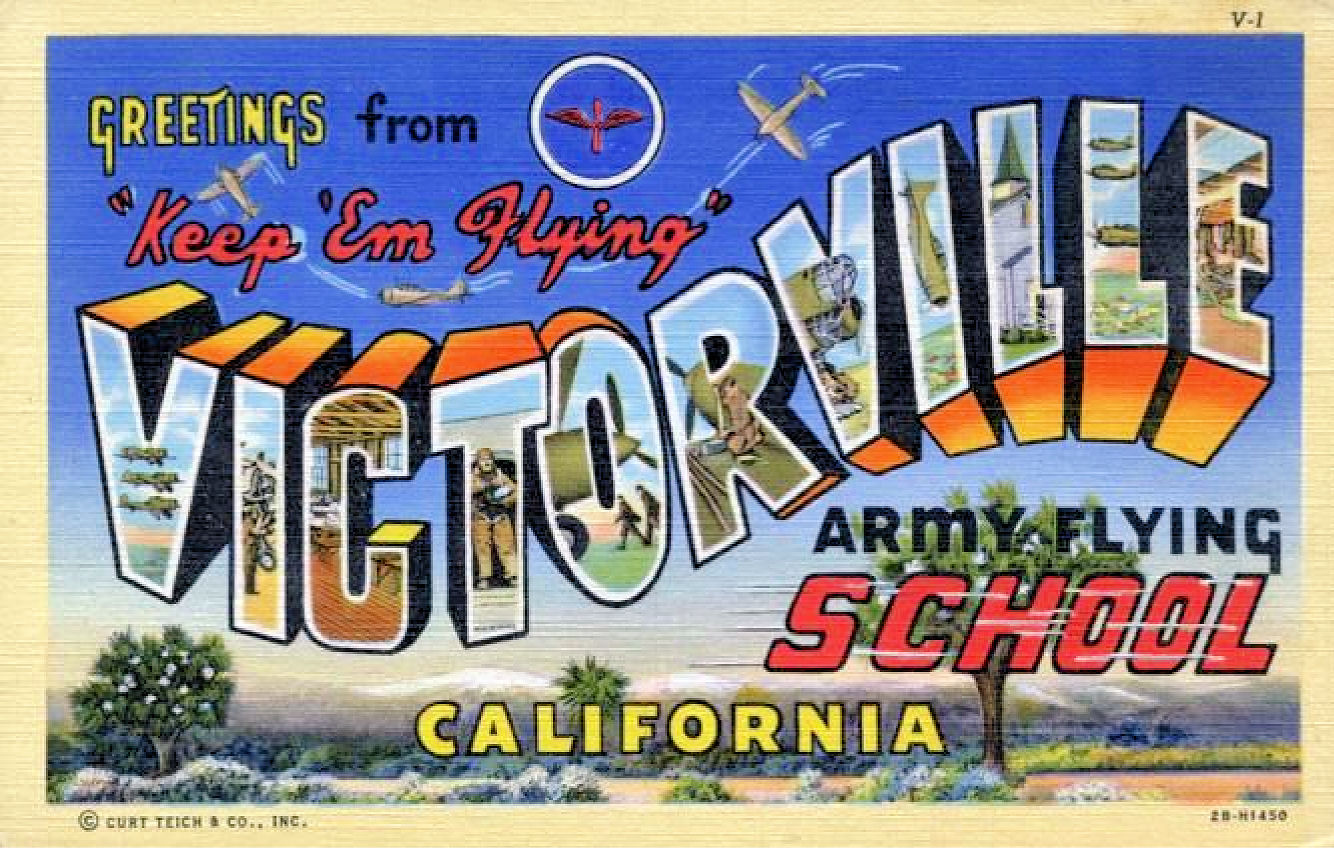
A 1943 postcard from Victorville Army Airfield California

Waco CG-4 Glider pilots were also trained at Victorville Field, with special emphasis on spot-landing and night flying. The gliders were an essential part of the 6 June 1944, D-Day invasion as hundreds of gliders carried troops and equipment to landing sites in Normandy, France. To ease the overcrowded runways at Victorville, glider students practiced take-offs and landings at the El Mirage Lakebed and El Mirage Field. There were seven oiled runways on the dusty dry lake and they worked well until the lake bed flooded in January 1943.

1944 saw several changes at Victorville Field, with the 3035th Army Air Forces Base Unit taking over the administrative organization of the school in April. On 15 March 1944 a transition training school for P-39 Airacobra single-engine pursuit pilots was established, announced that date by base C.O. Col. Earl C. Robbins. Also training for B-24 Liberator bombardiers began, and in September, a RADAR training school for bombardiers was established.

In May 1945, with the surrender of Germany, the training at Victorville Field began to slow down, and on 15 August, all training at the base ceased. After the Japanese capitulation, the post commander, Colonel Earl C. Robbins, was notified by Major General Willis H. Hale, Fourth Air Force, on 25 September that Victorville was to be placed in a standby status. On 12 October 1945, all flying at the airfield ended and the base was placed on standby status.

=== Postwar years ===
Victorville Army Airfield was used during the postwar years to store aircraft by Air Materiel Command. Sacramento Air Materiel Area took control in May 1947. Large numbers of aircraft were flown to the field and parked out in the high desert. These included Boeing B-29 Superfortress, Beechcraft AT-7 Navigator, and AT-11 trainers. Its caretaker host unit was renamed the 2756th Air Base Squadron in January 1948 after the establishment of the United States Air Force.

=== Cold War ===
The outbreak of the Korean War on 25 June 1950 meant that the United States Air Force would soon see an increase in training requirements. By 1 July the Air Force had approved plans to increase to 95-wings from the reduced force during the postwar years due to the demobilization after World War II. Experienced pilots trained in fighter jets were needed. The new Continental Air Command (ConAC) was assigned the dual missions of the air defense of the United States as well as the employment of tactical air forces to support contingency deployments around the world. ConAC activated the World War II training base at Victorville, now called George Air Force Base, and assigned it to the Air Defense Command.

When re-activated, George AFB had been in mothballs for five years, and many of the World War II buildings on it were deteriorating due to the temporary nature of the structures when they were built. A rapid refurbishment of the base was necessary to bring it up to postwar standards including updated electrical telephone and electrical systems, barracks and support buildings and extending a runway to accommodate jet aircraft. A dial telephone system was activated in mid-September 1953 after a year's planning. A new communications building was built with a main switchboard installed by the Kellogg Switchboard & Supply Company, Chicago.

=== Recent history ===
George AFB was closed pursuant to a decision by the 1988 Base Realignment and Closure (BRAC) Commission at the end of the Cold War. It is now the site of the Southern California Logistics Airport. In 2002, the High Desert Power Plant, an 830 MW combined cycle gas turbine power plant, opened on the site; since the 2010s various portions of the George AFB site also have been proposed as grid-scale energy storage facilities, taking advantage of its proximity to transmission facilities owned by Southern California Edison and the Los Angeles Department of Water and Power. Since 2009, the California Air National Guard's 196th Reconnaissance Squadron (96 RS) has operated an MQ-1 Predator Remotely Piloted Aircraft (RPA) training facility at the site.

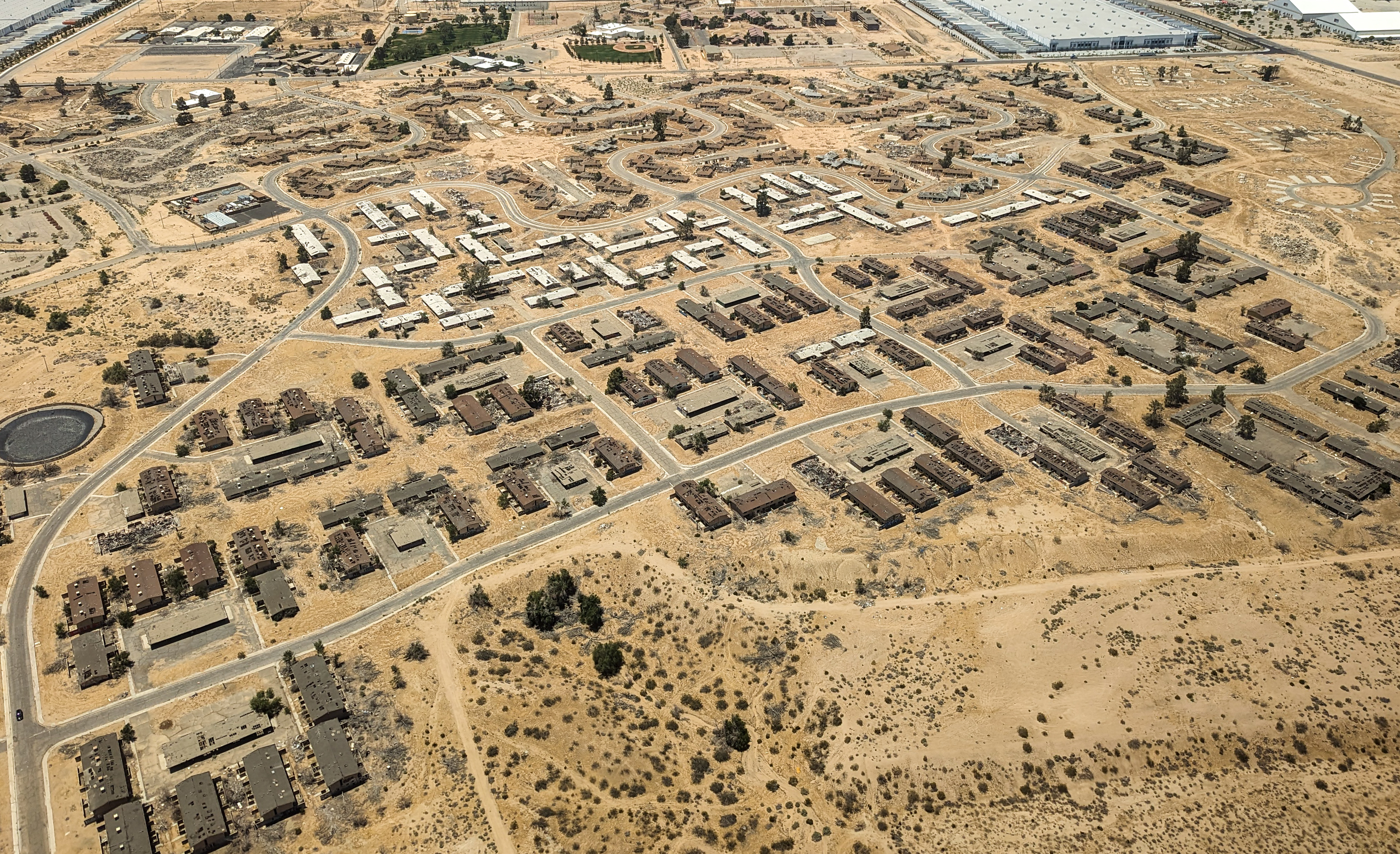
George AFB Housing aerial view, 2023

The abandoned military housing block has been used by private companies for various purposes. The site was a filming location for the film Jarhead, and episodes of TV series MythBusters and Roadkill. The abandoned housing has also been used for airsoft games, particularly military simulation (MilSim) ones.

== Primary USAF wings assigned ==
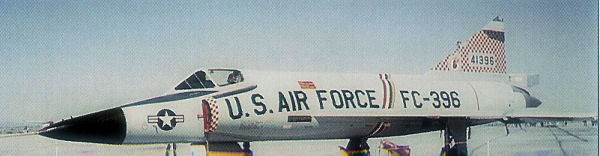
Convair F-102A-75-CO Delta Dagger AF Serial No. 56-1396 of the 327 FIS.

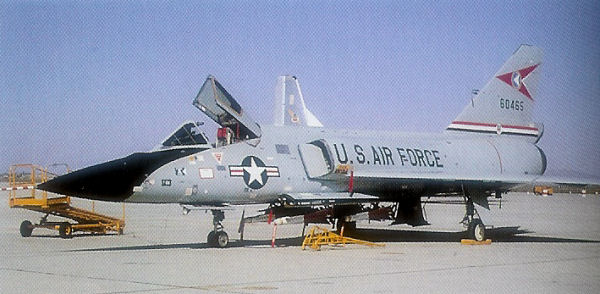
Convair F-106A Delta Dart AF Serial No. 56-0465 of the 329 FIS. To AMARC as FN0045 on 3 April 1984. Converted to QF-106 (AD149) Full Scale Aerial Target (FSAT). Shot down by AIM-120 9 November 1992.

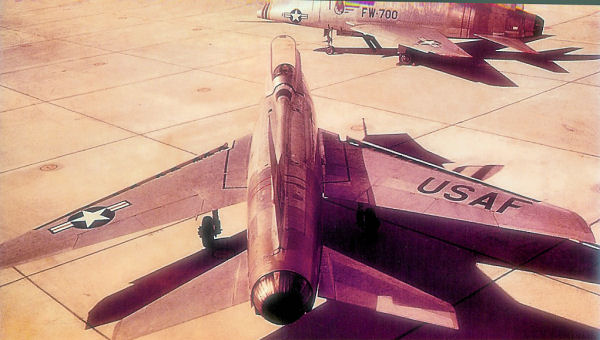
North American F-100A-20-NA Super Sabres including AF Serial No. 53-1700 "FW-700" of the 479th TFW, George AFB, California, 1954.

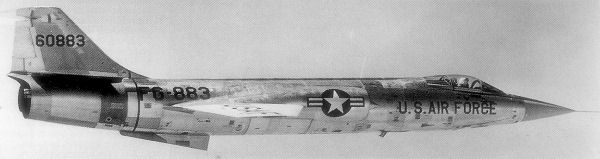
Lockheed F-104C-5-LO Starfighter, AF Ser. No. 56-0883 of the 479 TFW, George AFB, California, 1958.

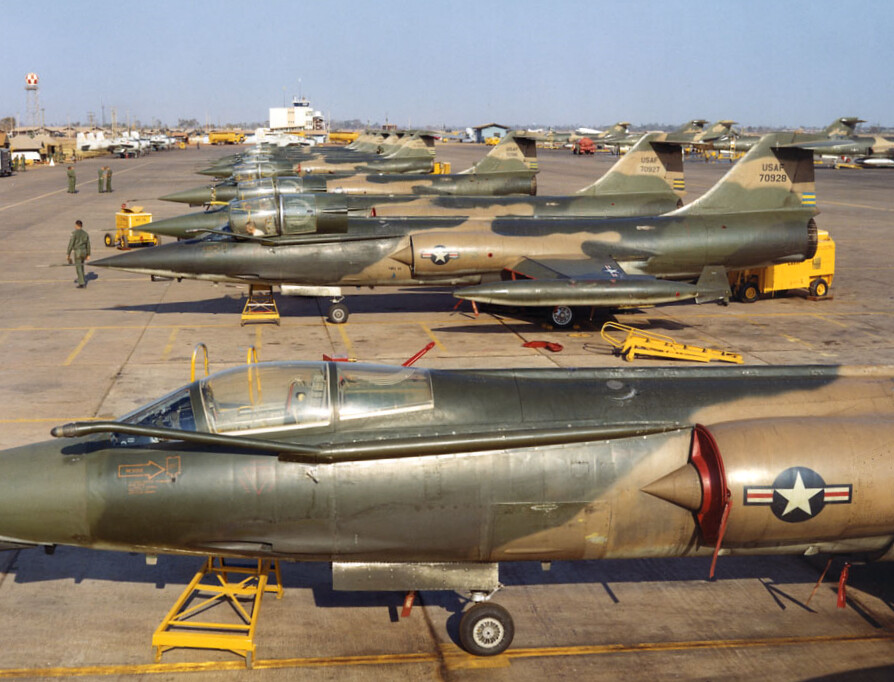
F-104s of the 476 TFS on the Da Nang flightline – 1965

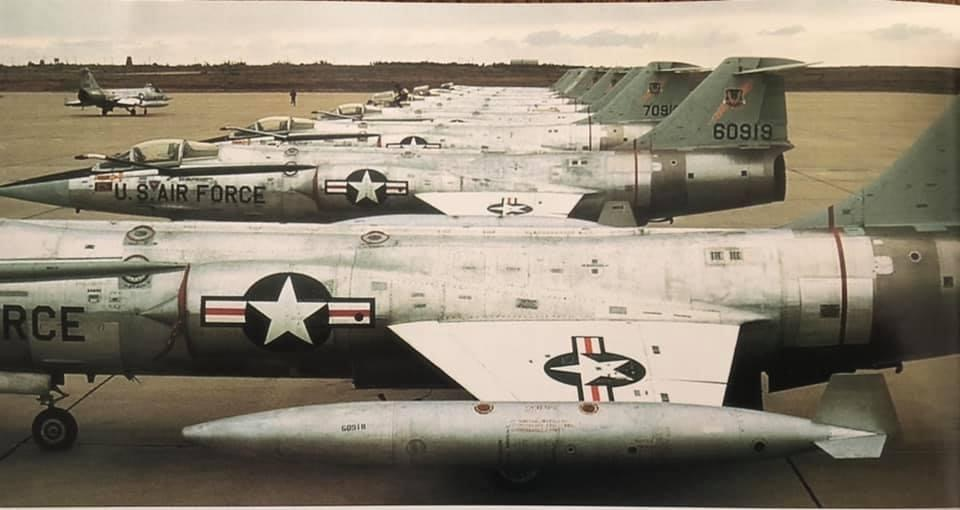
F-104C Starfighters from the 434th Tactical Fighter Squadron, 479th Tactical Fighter Wing, at Ching Chuan Kang Air Base, Taiwan, in April 1965.

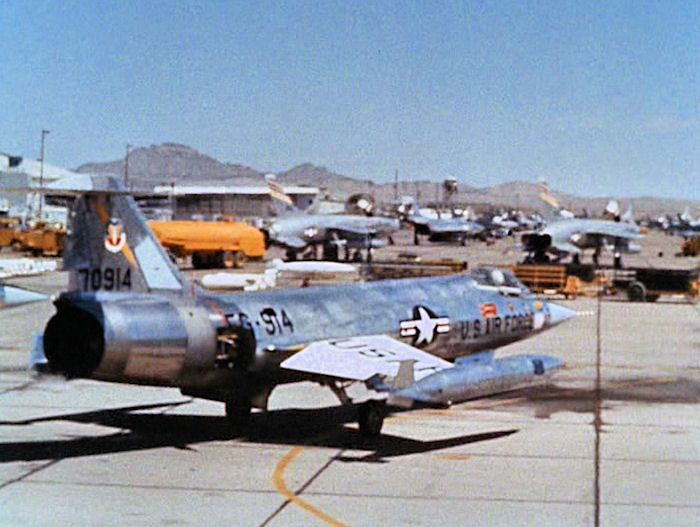
F-104C Starfighter, AF Ser. No. 57-0914, 435 TFS, 1965. This aircraft was deployed to Ubon RTAFB, Thailand in 1966 and assigned to 8 TFW. It crashed due to engine failure over Thailand on 16 January 1967.

=== 1st Fighter-Interceptor Wing ===
The initial USAF unit assigned to George AFB was the Continental Air Command's (ConAC) 1st Fighter-Interceptor Wing, being reassigned from March AFB, California on 18 July 1950. Operational squadrons of the 1st FIW were:

- 27th Fighter-Interceptor Squadron (1950–1951) (F-86A)
- 71st Fighter-Interceptor Squadron (1950–1951) (F-86A)
- 94th Fighter-Interceptor Squadron (1950–1955) (F-86A/D)

The 1st FIW headquarters was normally assigned to George, however during its time at George, its 27th Fighter-Interceptor Squadron was detached to Griffiss AFB, New York for attachment to the Eastern Air Defense Force (EADF). The 71st Fighter-Interceptor Squadron was attached to Air Force Reserve/Air National Guard facility at Pittsburgh International Airport, Pennsylvania, also as part of the EADF.

Air Defense Command (ADC) was reestablished as a major command on 1 January 1951. Continental Air Command lost responsibility for air defense on that date and the wing was reassigned to ADC.

In May 1951, the 27th and the 71st were attached to the 103d Fighter-Interceptor Wing, which provided administrative and logistical support and operational control, although the squadrons remained assigned to the 1st Fighter Group. Air Defense Command planners recognized that the policy of deploying squadrons over a wide area negated whatever advantages may have accrued from the establishment of the wing-base plan in 1948. In the case of the 1st Fighter-Interceptor Wing, a wing headquarters stationed in California could provide only limited control and virtually no support to squadrons deployed on the East Coast.

With the exception of the Headquarters and Headquarters Squadron, and the three fighter-interceptor squadrons, all 1st Fighter-interceptor Wing organizations and the group headquarters were reduced to a strength of one officer and one enlisted man on 30 November 1951, at which time the wing moved from George to Norton Air Force Base, California. The 94th FIS remained at George until 1955 when it was reassigned to Selfridge AFB, Michigan.

Other ADC squadrons assigned to the Western Air Defense Force at George were:

- 327th Fighter-Interceptor Squadron (1955–1958) (F-86D, F-102A)

Activated at George, 1955. First ADC squadron to fly the F-102A. Reassigned to Thule AB, Greenland

- 329th Fighter-Interceptor Squadron (1955–1967) (F-86D/L, F-102A, F-106A)

Activated at George, 1955. First ADC squadron to fly the F-106A. Inactivated 1967.

- 518th Fighter-Interceptor Squadron(1955–1959) (F-86D)

=== 479th Tactical Fighter Wing ===
The 479th Fighter-Bomber Wing was activated at George AFB on 1 December 1952. It was redesignated as the 479th Fighter-Day Wing on 15 February 1954, and the 479th Tactical Fighter Wing on 1 July 1958. Replaced the 131st Fighter-Bomber Wing at George AFB.

- Operational Squadrons were 434th, 435th, 436th and 476th Fighter-Bomber/Tactical Fighter Squadrons. Maintained tactical proficiency with F-51Ds (1952–53), later with F-86Fs (1953–55).
- Tactical components participated in numerous exercises, augmented air defenses of the West Coast, and deployed overseas to support other commands.
- Converted to the North American F-100A Super Sabre beginning in September 1954 and to Lockheed F-104C Starfighter beginning in October 1958. The 479th TFW was first TAC Wing equipped with the F-100. Trained F-104 pilots of foreign states, January 1962 – August 1963. Deployed to Ramstein Air Base, Germany in September 1961 during the building of the Berlin Wall. Had one squadron deployed at NAS Key West, Florida, (435th TFS) during the Cuban Missile Crisis of 1962.
- During 1964–1965 the 23d Air Base Group at Da Nang AB South Vietnam supported the 476th and 479th TFS in regular TDY rotations. Their job was to fly MiG combat air patrol (MiGCAP) missions to protect American fighter bombers against attack by North Vietnamese fighters.
- In April 1965, deployed two squadrons to Ching Chuan Kang Air Base Taiwan (434th and 435th TFS) and one Takhli RTAFB Thailand (476th TFS) to provide air defenses of northern area of the Republic of Vietnam.
- Transferred one F-104 (476th TFS) squadron to Udon RTAFB Thailand in June 1966 to carry out escort and bombing missions with the F-4Cs at Udon. An additional 12 F-104Cs joined the 8th TFW at Udon on 22 July.
- The wing conducted F-104 replacement training until early-1967. Transferred all F-104s in July 1967.
- Retired F-104s and gained four McDonnell Douglas F-4C Phantom II Combat Crew Training Squadrons in December 1965 (68th TFS, 71st TFS, 431st TFS, plus one other, four squadrons total), and began F-4D replacement training in February 1967.
- 68th TFS inactivated April 1968, F-4Ds assigned to a newly created 4535th CCTS,(Combat Crew Training Squadron). 435th TFS inactivated May 1970, F-4s assigned to 4552d CCTS.
- Began training foreign personnel in F-4 operations and maintenance in March 1969, including pilots from Israel, Iran, Japan, and West Germany.
- Inactivated, and replaced by the 35 TFW, in October 1971.

=== 35th Tactical Fighter Wing ===
The 35th Tactical Fighter Wing reactivated at George Air Force Base, California, on 1 October 1971, where it replaced the 479th Tactical Fighter Wing. The wing's mission at George was to take over the mission of training F-4 flight crews. Its operational squadrons (Tail Code: GA) were:

- 434th Tactical Fighter Squadron (October 1971 – October 1975) (F-4D)
  434th Tactical Fighter Training Squadron (October 1975 – January 1977) (F-4E)
- 4435th Combat Crew Training Squadron (October 1971 – December 1972) F-4C, Red/White Tail stripe.
  4435th Tactical Fighter Replacement Squadron (December 1972 – January 1976) (F-4E, 1972) (F-4C, 1972–1976)
- 4452nd Combat Crew Training Squadron (October 1971 – October 1973) (F-4D, 1972) (F-4E, 1972–1973)
- 20th Tactical Fighter Squadron
  (December 1972 – 1981) (F-4C) (1972–1975) (F-4F) (1981 – June 1992) (F-4E)
- 21st Tactical Fighter Training Squadron (December 1972 – October 1980) (F-4C)
  21st Tactical Fighter Squadron (October 1980 – October 1989) (F-4E)
  21st Tactical Fighter Training Squadron (October 1989 – June 1991) (F-4E)
- 431st Tactical Fighter Training Squadron (December 1972 – October 1978) (F-4D, 1972) (F-4E, January 1976 – October 1978)
- 4535th Combat Crew Training Squadron (December 1972) (F-4C)

With the arrival of F-105F/G aircraft from the 388th TFW at Korat RTAFB, Thailand in July 1973, the wing began training aircrews for radar detection and suppression or "Wild Weasel" missions in addition to other F-4 training. By 1975, with the arrival of new F-4G aircraft, the wing was training aircrews exclusively in Wild Weasel operations for deployment to operational units in Okinawa and Germany.

- 561st Tactical Fighter Squadron (July 1973 – July 1980) (F-105F/G), (F-4G, Tail Code: WW July 1980 – October 1989)
- 562nd Tactical Fighter Squadron (October 1974 – July 1980) (F-105F/G), (F-4G, Tail Code: WW July 1980 – October 1989)
- 563rd Tactical Fighter Training Squadron (July 1975 – July 1977) (F-105F/G)
  563rd Tactical Fighter Squadron (F-4G, Tail Code: WW July 1977 – October 1989)
- 39th Tactical Fighter Squadron
  (January 1977 – May 1984) (F-4C Tail Code: WW) (January 1976 – October 1980) (F-4E, January 1982 – May 1984)

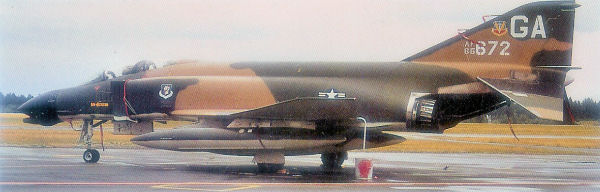
McDonnell F-4D-28-MC Phantom II AF Serial No. 65-0672, 4452nd Combat Crew Training Squadron 10 June 1972. Retired to AMARC as FP0308 on 20 September 1989.

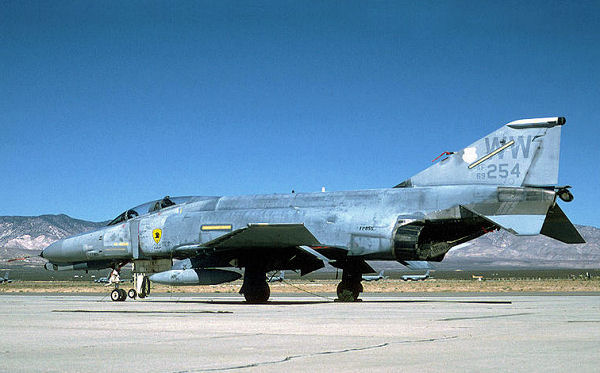
McDonnell Douglas F-4E-43-MC Phantom II AF Serial No. 69-7254/WW in F-4G configuration awaits its turn at Mojave for conversion to a 'Red Tail' Full Scale Aerial Target (FSAT) drone. White fin cap indicates aircraft was assigned to the 563 TFS, inactivated October 1989. Converted to QF-4G AF-209. Expended as target 4 June 2002.

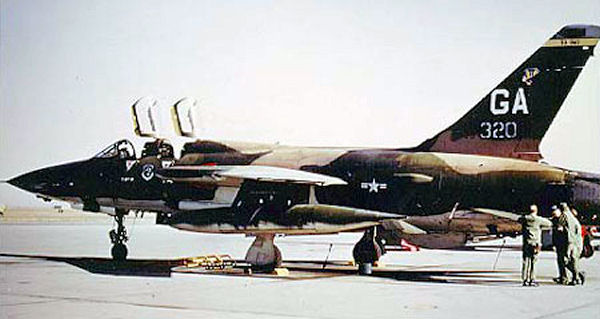
Republic F-105F-1-RE Thunderchief, AF Serial No. 63-8320 of the 561st Tactical Fighter Squadron, 35th Tactical Fighter Wing, George Air Force Base, California, November 1973. Converted to F-105G in 1972. This aircraft scored 3 MiG kills in Vietnam with the 388th TFW and is currently on display at the National Museum of the United States Air Force. (U.S. Air Force photo)

In 1980, the wing received the new F-4G and its advanced Wild Weasel system. By July 1980, the last F-105G left George Air Force Base, leaving the 37th TFW with F-4Gs in its inventory for Wild Weasel training and operational missions.

Operations at George Air Force Base were reorganized by mission requirements 30 March 1981. The 35th Tactical Fighter Wing retained control of the 20th and 21st Tactical Fighter Training Squadrons and gained the 39th Tactical Fighter Squadron.

With the inactivation of the 39th Tactical Fighter Squadron in 1985, the 35th Tactical Fighter Wing was redesignated the 35th Tactical Training Wing. However, the wing kept its air defense augmentation responsibility. It provided operations and maintenance support for the close air support portion of Army training exercises conducted at the U.S. Army National Training Center at Fort Irwin, Calif., from 1981 to 1990. Also, the wing advised specific Air National Guard units on F-4 operations from 1981 to 1991.

The new 37th Tactical Fighter Wing assumed the 561st Tactical Fighter Squadron (TFS), 562nd Tactical Fighter Training Squadron (TFTS), and 563rd Tactical Fighter Squadron (TFS)for active Wild Weasel missions in 1981. This training ended in 1989 when the 37th TFW was reassigned to Tonopah Test Range Nevada assuming F-117A operational development.

Operations at George Air Force Base were reorganized again 5 October 1989. The 37th Tactical Fighter Wing and the 35th Tactical Training Wing consolidated all operations under the newly redesignated 35th Tactical Fighter Wing. Under the reorganization the 35th regained control of the 561st Tactical Fighter Squadron and the 562nd Tactical Fighter Training Squadron.

In August 1990, the 35th Tactical Fighter Wing mobilized in support of Operation Desert Shield. On 16 August 1990, 24 F-4Gs of the 561st Tactical Fighter Squadron left George Air Force Base en route to Shaikh Isa Air Base, Bahrain. Once in the Middle East, its deployed people established operational, maintenance and living facilities for the 35th Tactical Fighter Wing (Provisional). These facilities eventually housed more than 60 active duty and Air National Guard F-4s and more than 2,600 military members.

During Operation Desert Storm, which started 17 January 1991, the 561st Tactical Fighter Squadron flew 1,182 combat sorties for a total of 4,393.5 hours. The 35th Tactical Fighter Wing (Provisional) was credited with flying 3,072 combat missions for 10,318.5 hours. U.S. Central Command relied heavily on the wing's Wild Weasels to suppress enemy air defense systems. The F-4G aircrews were credited with firing 905 missiles at Iraqi targets, while the RF-4C aircrews shot more than 300,000 feet of vital reconnaissance film. During operations Desert Shield and Desert Storm, the 35th Tactical Fighter Wing (Provisional) suffered no casualties. The wing's people began returning to George Air Force Base 23 March 1991, with its aircraft and pilots following three days later.

The 35th became the host unit for George Air Force Base when the 831st Air Division there inactivated on 31 March 1991. As a result, the wing gained several support agencies, including the 35th Combat Support Group and associated squadrons. In support of the Air Force's force reduction programs, the 21st Tactical Fighter Training Squadron inactivated 28 June 1991. That October, as part of the Air Force's reorganization plan, the 35th Tactical Fighter Wing was redesignated the 35th Fighter Wing. A month later, the wing's tactical fighter squadrons were redesignated as fighter squadrons.

In 1992, the 35th began downsizing in preparation for the closure of George Air Force Base. On 5 June 1992, the 20th Fighter Squadron moved to Holloman Air Force Base, New Mexico, and by the end of June, the 561st and 562nd Fighter Squadrons were inactivated.

On 15 December 1992, the 35th Fighter Wing inactivated and George Air Force Base closed bringing an end to 21 years of continuous service and more than 34 years of total service for the 35 FW.

== Secondary USAF wings assigned ==
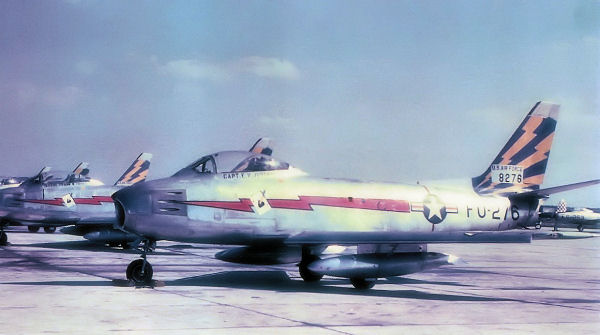
North American F-86A-5-NA Sabre, AF Ser. No. 48-0276 of the 116th Fighter-Interceptor Squadron, 1951.

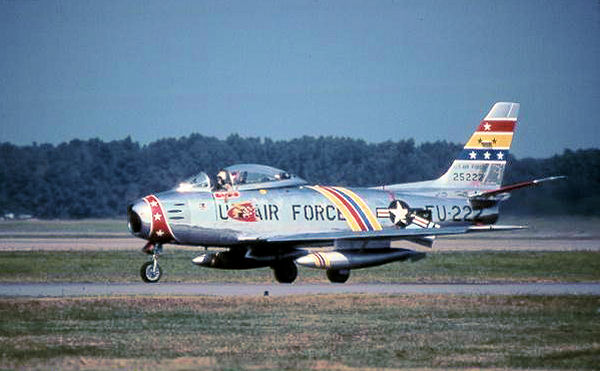
North American F-86F-35-NA Sabre, AF Ser. No. 52-5222 of the 72d Fighter-Bomber Squadron in 1955. The aircraft was painted in the 21st FBW Wing Commander's motif, with blue, yellow and red striping. In 2004, Canadair Sabre N86FS was painted to represent 52-5222, but it crashed in 2006.

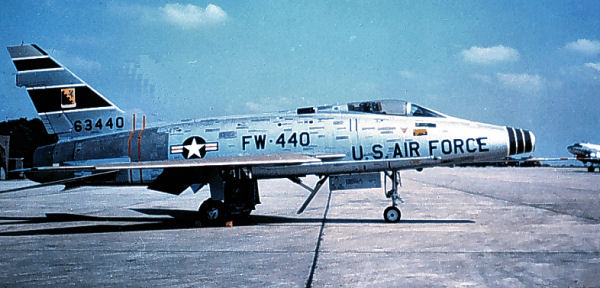
North American F-100D-85-NH Super Sabre, AF Ser. No. 56-3440 of the 308th Tactical Fighter Squadron.

=== 452d Bombardment Wing (Light) ===
As a result of the Korean War, the Long Beach Municipal Airport, California Air Force Reserve 452d Bombardment Wing (Light) was mobilized at George AFB and ordered to active duty 10 August 1950. Four squadrons (728th, 729th, 730th, 731st) of Douglas B-26 Invaders.

The wing was deployed to Itazuke AB Japan October 1950. It was the first Air Force Reserve wing to fly combat missions in Korea.

=== 116th Fighter-Bomber Wing ===
The 116th Fighter-Bomber Wing was a Washington Air National Guard unit activated to federal service during the Korean War. Received five Republic F-84G Thunderjets becoming the first Guard unit west of the Mississippi River to be equipped with the jets. On 1 February 1951, as a result of the Korean War, the 116th Fighter Squadron received new North American F-86A Sabres.

The 116th FBW was ordered to RAF Shepherds Grove, England, in August 1951 to bolster NATO forces in Europe. The move was the first time in aviation history that a full tactical fighter squadron had crossed an ocean.

=== 131st Fighter-Bomber Wing ===
The 131st Fighter-Bomber Wing was a federalized Missouri Air National Guard unit during the Korean War. It was assigned to George AFB during August 1951. The wing trained at George AFB with North American F-51D Mustangs. It was relieved from active duty and returned to state control on 1 December 1952.

=== 21st Fighter-Bomber Wing ===
The 21st Fighter-Bomber Wing was activated at George AFB on 1 January 1953 with three (72d, 416th and 531st) Fighter-Bomber squadrons, equipped with F-86F Sabres. While at George AFB, the wing established and maintained tactical proficiency and provided air defense augmentation. In December 1954, the wing was assigned to NATO and was reassigned to Chambley-Bussieres Air Base, France.

=== 413th Tactical Fighter Wing ===
The 413th Tactical Fighter Wing was activated at George AFB on 11 November 1954 as the 413th Fighter-Bomber Wing. It was initially equipped with four (1st, 21st, 34th, and 474th) F-86H squadrons.

Transitioned to the F-100D/F in 1958, becoming the 413 TFW. The wing trained to achieve and maintain combat readiness by participation in tactical exercises, firepower demonstrations, joint training with US Army and US Marine Corps units, and tactical evaluations. Provided augmentation of Sixteenth Air Force to Morón Air Base, Spain through deployment of assigned squadrons on a rotational basis, 1958–1959. The 1st Fighter Day Squadron was commanded by then-Lieutenant Colonel Chuck Yeager from April 1957 until its inactivation in March 1959. The wing was inactivated on 15 March 1959 for budgetary reasons. The 34 TFS was inactivated, and personnel and F-100s of all four squadrons were reassigned to incoming 31 TFW.

=== 31st Tactical Fighter Wing ===
On 15 March 1959 the 31st Tactical Fighter Wing was activated without personnel or equipment at George AFB, and absorbed the personnel and equipment of the inactivated 413 TFW.

The 31st was previously assigned to Turner AFB, Georgia as a Strategic Air Command fighter wing and had transferred its F-100s to the 354th Tactical Fighter Wing at Myrtle Beach Air Force Base, South Carolina in 1956 after SAC turned all of its strategic escort fighters over to Tactical Air Command. The 31st was maintained as an inactive "paper unit" by TAC with no personnel or equipment assigned until it was reactivated at George AFB.

The reassignment equipped four F-100D/F tactical fighter squadrons (306th, 307th, 308th, 309th) which were trained for nuclear as well as conventional operational capabilities. The 31 TFW was reassigned to Homestead AFB, Florida on 31 May 1962.

=== 355th Tactical Fighter Wing ===
The 355th Tactical Fighter Wing was activated at George AFB on 13 April 1962. Four operational tactical fighter squadrons (354th, 357th, 421st, and 469th) equipped with Republic F-105D/F aircraft. The wing trained in tactical fighter operations and deployed tactical squadrons overseas as required, primarily to combat duty in Southeast Asia.

- 354th TFS deployed to Korat RTAFB and Takhli RTAFB, Thailand 24 January–21 February 1964, and 2 May–20 September 1964 as a part of the USAF buildup of forces in Thailand.

The 355 TFW was reassigned to McConnell AFB, Kansas on 21 July 1964.

=== 32d/8th Tactical Fighter Wing ===
On 1 April 1964, the 32d Tactical Fighter Wing was activated and being organized at George AFB. Three fighter squadrons (68th, 433d, and 497th) were equipped with F-4Cs.

On 18 June 1964, the 8th Tactical Fighter Wing was reassigned without personnel or equipment to George AFB from Itazuke AB, Japan as part of an overall effort to reduce the number of wings in Japan. The 8th TFW replaced and absorbed the resources of the 32d TFW. Operational squadrons of the 8th TFW at George were:

- 68th Tactical Fighter Squadron
- 433d Tactical Fighter Squadron
- 497th Tactical Fighter Squadron

While at George AFB, the wing trained with the McDonnell Douglas F-4C Phantom II fighter aircraft. The 68th TFS deployed to Korat RTAFB Thailand during July–December 1964, with the wing participated in numerous exercises, operational readiness inspections, and the like.

The entire 8th TFW was reassigned to Ubon Royal Thai Air Force Base, Thailand in December 1965 to commence combat operations in the Vietnam War.

=== Det 1 84 Fighter Interceptor Squadron ===
The Det1 of 84th FIS was (primary unit was at Castle AFB) opened in 1975 and was a live alert defense unit. One of many F106 units around the country to protect the US borders.

=== 37th Tactical Fighter Wing ===
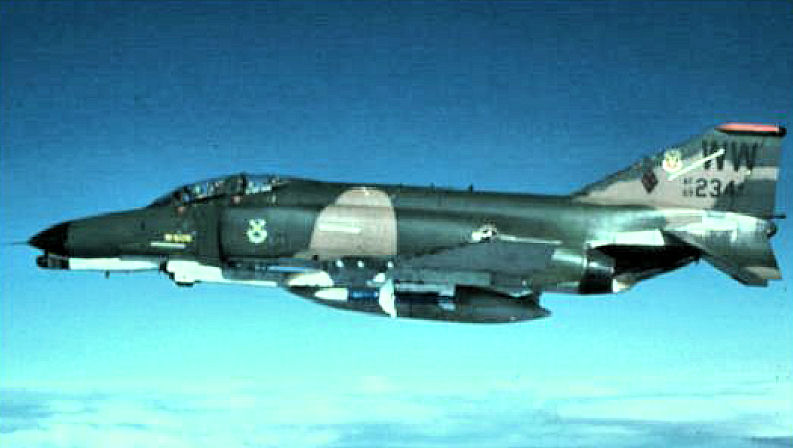
563rd Tactical Fighter Squadron McDonnell Douglas F-4G Phantom II, AF Ser. No. 69-7234

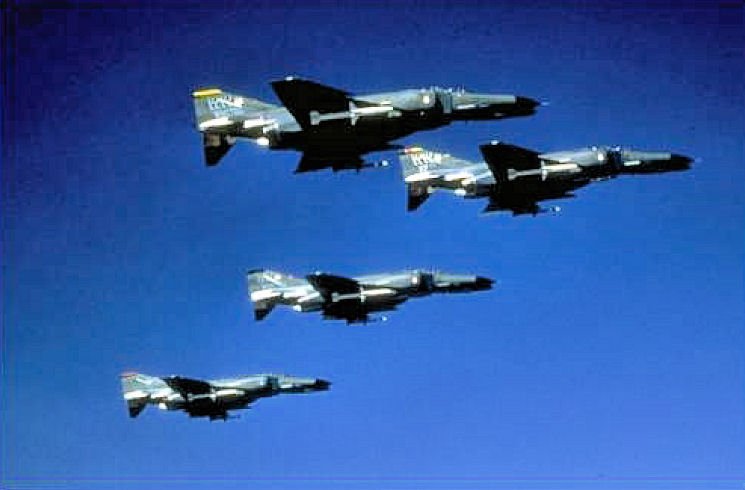
F-4G Phantom II formation from the 37th Tactical Fighter Wing, 561st TFS (yellow tail) 562nd TFTS (blue tail) 563rd (red tail) and Wing Commander (rainbow tail), 1982

The 37th was reactivated on 30 March 1981 by Tactical Air Command at George Air Force Base, California. Its mission was to provide pilot transition training to the F-4G Phantom II "Wild Weasel" RADAR suppression aircraft. The mission was transferred to the 37th from the 35th Tactical Fighter Wing, which was TAC's primary F-4E Phantom II training organization in a mission realignment. Both wings were under the TAC's 831st Air Division. Assigned squadrons of the 37th (Tail Code: "WW") at George AFB were:

- 561st Tactical Fighter Squadron: 30 March 1981 – 5 October 1989 (Yellow Tail Stripe)
- 562nd Tactical Fighter Training Squadron: 30 March 1981 – 5 October 1989 (Blue Tail Stripe)

As the only "Wild Weasel" training wing in the world, it provided instructor pilots and qualified aircrews for the other two "Wild Weasel" wings in the Philippines (3d TFW) and West Germany (52d TFW). As part of the training mission, the wing participated in numerous tactical, maritime, and electronic warfare exercises locally and worldwide in hunter/killer tactics, suppression of enemy air defenses, force escort operations and dissimilar air combat training with Air National Guard and Air Force Reserve squadrons, and various allies. Wing aircrews and ground personnel won the United States Air Force Worldwide Fighter gunnery meet in 1985 and 1987.

In 1988, George AFB was scheduled in the first round of base closures passed by Congress under the Base Realignment and Closure program. On 5 October 1989, the 37th TFW turned over F-4G aircraft to the host 35th TFW at George AFB.

=== Superfund site ===
In June 2018, Military Times reported several cases of unusual medical conditions suffered by Air Force women and wives of service members, plus one case of a rare cancer that killed the Air Force husband of one of the affected women. The article claims that nearly 300 women have connected on Facebook, and shared tales of ovarian cysts, uterine tumors, birth defects in their children, hysterectomies, and miscarriages. Jet fuel, trichloroethylene, and PFOS/PFOA are said to contaminate the base's water supply. George AFB was designated a superfund site by the Environmental Protection Agency in 1990. Remedial action is still underway to clean up 33 separate hazardous wastes left there.

=== Closure ===
George Air Force Base was officially decommissioned in December 1992. In 1993, President Bill Clinton announced a "Five Part Plan" to speed economic recovery in communities where military bases were to be closed. One part of this plan called for improving public participation in the base's environmental cleanup program. George AFB was among a number of installations where environmental cleanup was placed on a "fast track" so base property could be quickly transferred to the community for reuse.

=== Names of facility ===
- Air Corps Advanced Flying School, 23 June 1941
- Victorville Army Flying School, 6 February 1942
- Victorville Army Air Field, 23 April 1943
- Victorville Air Force Base, 13 Jan 1948
- George Air Force Base, 2 June 1950

=== Major commands to which assigned ===
- West Coast Air Corps Training Center, 26 June 1941
- Air Corps Flying Training Command, 23 January 1942

Re-designated: Army Air Forces Flying Training Command, 15 March 1942
Re-designated: Army Air Forces Training Command, 31 July 1943

Placed on standby and inactive status, 12 October 1945

- Air Technical Service Command, 1 November 1945

Re-designated Air Materiel Command, 9 March 1946

Transferred to jurisdiction of Sacramento Air Materiel Area, 15 May 1947
Designated a sub-installation of San Bernardino Air Depot, 15 December 1948

- Continental Air Command, 1 April 1950

Activated: 1 November 1950

- Air Defense Command, 1 January 1951
- Strategic Air Command, 23 July 1951
- Tactical Air Command, 15 November 1951 – 1 June 1992
- Air Combat Command, 1 June 1992 – 15 December 1992

=== Major units assigned ===
- USAAF Bombardier School, June 1941 – December 1944
- 87th Base HQ and Air Base Sq, 1 October 1941

Redesignated: 87th Air Base Sq, 18 July 1942 – 30 April 1944

- Air Corps (later Army Air Force) Advanced Flying School, 26 June 1941 – 23 December 1944
- 63d Troop Carrier Group, 18 November 1942 – 7 May 1943
- 3035th AAF Base Unit, 1 March 1944

Redesignated: 4196th AAF Base Unit, 1 November 1945
Redesignated: 2756th AF Base Unit, 28 August 1948
Redesignated: 2579th Air Base Sq, 1 May – 18 July 1950

- 36th Fighter-Interceptor Training Wing, 8 January – 30 December 1943
- Army Air Force Radar Observer School, September 1944 – October 1945
- 434th Troop Carrier Group, 1 October 1945 – 2 February 1946
- 482d Bombardment Group, 5 July 1945 – 1 September 1945
- 1st Fighter-Interceptor Wing, 18 July – 1 December 1951
- 94th Fighter-Interceptor Squadron, 18 July 1950 – 15 August 1955
- 452d Bombardment Wing, 10 August 1950 – 26 October 1950
- 116th Fighter-Bomber Wing, 7 November 1950 – 1 July 1951

Federalized Georgia Air National Guard

- 131st Fighter-Bomber Wing, 7 August 1951 – 1 December 1952

Federalized Missouri Air National Guard

- 146th Fighter-Bomber Wing, 25 October 1951 – 1 January 1953

Federalized California Air National Guard

- 479th Fighter-Day (later Tactical Fighter) Wing, 1 December 1952 – 1 October 1971
- 21st Fighter-Bomber Wing, 1 January 1953 – 28 November 1954
- 456th Fighter-Interceptor Squadron, 8 August 1954 – 18 August 1955
- 518th Fighter-Interceptor Squadron, 8 January 1955 – 18 August 1955
- 327th Fighter-Interceptor Squadron, 18 August 1955 – 2 July 1958
- 329th Fighter-Interceptor Squadron, 18 August 1955 – 1 July 1967
- 413th Fighter-Day (later Tactical Fighter) Wing, 24 October 1957 – 15 March 1959
- 831st Air Division, 8 October 1957 – 20 April 1971; 1 December 1980 – 31 March 1991
- 31st Tactical Fighter Wing, 15 March 1959 – 31 May 1962
- 355th Tactical Fighter Wing, 8 June 1962 – 31 July 1964
- USAF Advanced Flying (later Combat Crew Training) School, 1 July 1962 – 8 January 1965
- 431st Fighter-Interceptor (later Tactical Fighter) Squadron, 18 May 1964 – 30 October 1970; 15 January 1976 – 1 October 1978
- 32d Tactical Fighter Wing, 1 April 1964

Inactivated and replaced by 8th Fighter-Bomber (later Tactical Fighter) Wing, 10 July 1964 – 8 December 1965

- 68th Fighter-Interceptor (later Tactical Fighter) Squadron, 16 June 1964 – 1 October 1968
- 497th Fighter-Interceptor (later Tactical Fighter) Squadron, 18 June 1964 – 8 December 1965
- 35th Tactical Fighter (later Fighter) Wing, 1 October 1971 – 15 December 1992
- 37th Tactical Fighter Wing, 30 March 1981 – 5 October 1989

== George Air Force Base in popular culture ==
The following projects used the base as a filming location from 1940 to 2005.

Movies

- The Starfighters
- The War of the Worlds: was namechecked as Victorville in the 1953 version of the film.
- Jet Pilot
- Face Off
- Jarhead

Television

- Six Million Dollar Man
- Roadkill (web series) and Roadkill Garage

== See also ==
- United States Air Forces in Europe
- United States Air Force In Thailand
- California World War II Army Airfields
- 35th Flying Training Wing (World War II)
- Western Air Defense Force (Air Defense Command)
- Base Realignment and Closure
