= El Mirage Field =

El Mirage Field Adelanto Airport Mirage Auxiliary Airfield
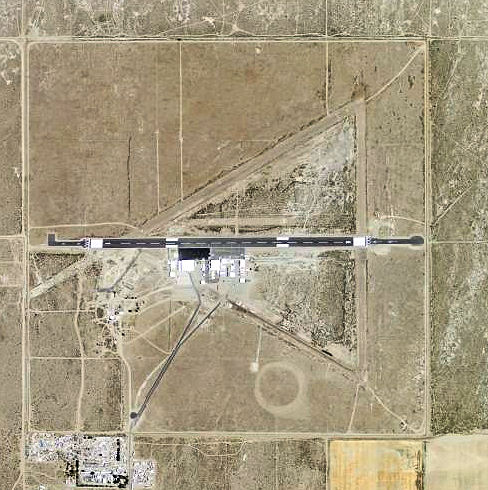
- 2006 USGS airphoto
- IATA: none; ICAO: none; FAA LID: 99CL

Summary
- Serves: El Mirage, California
- Coordinates: 34°37′24″N 117°35′59″W

Map
- Location of El Mirage Field

Runways
Direction	Length		Surface
Direction	ft	m	Surface
04/22	3,700	1,128	Asphalt (closed)
16/34	3,700	1,128	Asphalt (closed)
08/26	6,386	1,946	Asphalt

El Mirage Field is a private airport located 3 miles west of El Mirage, California. It is leased by General Atomics of San Diego. Its primary use is the development and testing of unmanned aerial vehicles (UAV) for the United States military and US Government.

El Mirage Field, has a sister site located at Grey Butte Field Airport.

== History ==
During World War II, the airport was designated as Mirage Auxiliary Airfield (No 3), and was an auxiliary training airfield for Victorville Army Airfield, California.

The wartime runways are abandoned and now used by General Atomics for their UAV testing.

== See also ==
- California World War II Army Airfields
