= Briegleb BG-6 =

BG-6

General information
- Type: Single-seat Glider
- National origin: United States
- Manufacturer: Sailplane Corporation of America
- Designer: William G Briegleb
- Number built: 9 (+67 kits)

History
- First flight: 1939
- Variant: Briegleb BG-7

The Briegleb BG-6 was a 1930s single-seat glider designed by William G. Briegleb to be both factory and homebuilt.

== Development ==
The BG-6 is a high-wing single-seat glider with a steel-tube-and-fabric fuselage, wooden wings with fabric covering and a metal-and-fabric tail. The type certificate was approved on 14 September 1940.

Nine gliders were built by Briegleb's company, the Sailplane Corporation of America, and 67 kits were sold to homebuilders. Three factory-built gliders were impressed into service with the United States Army Air Forces in 1942.

== Variants ==
BG-6
Company designation for both factory and homebuilt aircraft.
XTG-9
United States Army Air Corps designation for three factory built BG-6s which were impressed as training gliders in 1942.

== Aircraft on Display ==
National Soaring Museum - In Storage

== Operators ==
United States

- United States Army Air Corps

== Specifications (BG-6) ==
Data from

General characteristics

- Crew: 1
- Wingspan: 32 ft 4 in (9.86 m)
- Wing area: 117.5 sq ft (10.91 m^{2})
- Aspect ratio: 8.9
- Gross weight: 425 lb (193 kg)

Performance

- Rate of sink: 179 ft/min (0.91 m/s)

== See also ==
- Briegleb El Mirage Airfield

Related lists

- List of Gliders
