= Grey Butte Field Airport =

Private airport in California

Gray Butte Field Airport Gray Butte Auxiliary Airfield
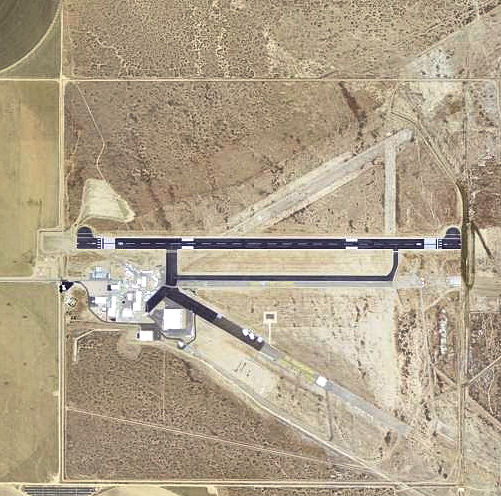
- 2006 USGS airphoto
- IATA: none; ICAO: none; FAA LID: 04CA (formerly GXA)

Summary
- Serves: Palmdale, California
- Elevation AMSL: 3,028 ft / 923 m
- Coordinates: 34°33′59″N 117°40′13″W

Map
- Location of Gray Butte Field Airport in the Los Angeles Metropolitan Area Location of Gray Butte Field in California

Runways
Direction	Length		Surface
Direction	ft	m	Surface
08/26	8,000	2,438	Asphalt

Gray Butte Field Airport is a private airport located 25 miles east of Palmdale, California. It is owned by General Atomics of San Diego. Its primary use is the development and testing of Unmanned Aerial Vehicles (UAV) for the United States Military and the United States Government.

Gray Butte Field Airport, has a sister site located at El Mirage Field.

Aircraft known to have been operated and developed at this facility include:

- General Atomics Avenger
- General Atomics MQ-9 Reaper
- Predator B
- Predator XP
- Gray Eagle
- Gray Eagle Extended Range (GE-ER)
- MQ-9B
- General Atomics XQ-67A

== History ==
During World War II, the airport was designated as Gray Butte Auxiliary Airfield (No 4), and was an auxiliary training airfield for Victorville Army Airfield, California.

The wartime runways are abandoned and now used by General Atomics for their UAV testing.

The airfield was assigned the FAA location identifier GVM, but on July 26, 2012, the airport's location identifier was changed to 04CA..

== See also ==
- California World War II Army Airfields
