= Victorville Army Airfield auxiliary fields =

US WWII airfield

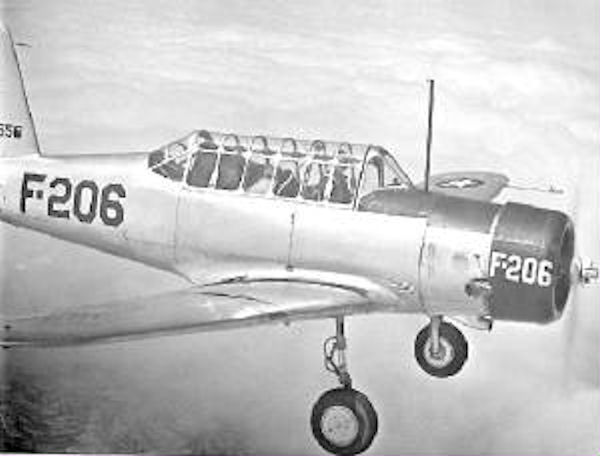
Vultee BT-13 Valiant in California, an Army training plane

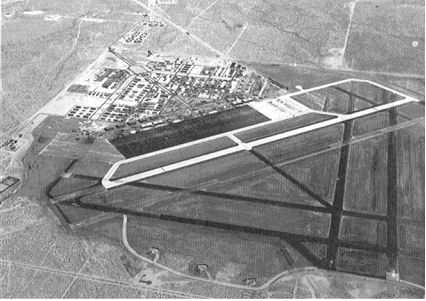
Victorville Army Airfield in 1943

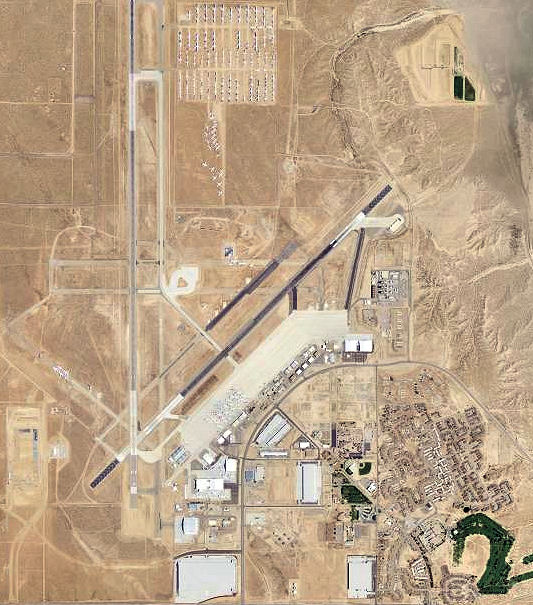
Southern California Logistics Airport, formerly George Air Force Base and called Victorville Army Airfield prior to that, in a 2006 USGS air photo

Victorville Army Air Field, 1944 Classbook

Victorville Army Airfield auxiliary fields were four airfields used during World War II to support the Victorville Army Airfield pilot training near Victorville, California, and Adelanto, California. After the war the Victorville Army Airfield was renamed George Air Force Base on January 13, 1948. The airfields were built in 1941 by the United States Army Air Corps just before the war. Victorville Army Airfield covered 2,200-acre in the Mojave Desert. The US Army held a groundbreaking ceremony on 12 July 1941. The base, called Victorville Army Flying School, was ready to use before the attack on Pearl Harbor on December 7, 1941. The Army built four runways in a triangle configuration, with one runway down the middle of the triangle. Seven hangars were built to support operation. On April 23, 1943, the base was renamed Victorville Army Airfield.

== Victorville Army Airfield ==
With the US now in the war, many pilots were needed, the first classes started in February 1942. Aircraft based at the school for training were: Curtiss-Wright AT-9, North American T-6 Texan, and Cessna AT-17 Bobcat. Bomber crews were also trained at the base in AT-11 Kansan and Vultee BT-13 Valiant. The first pilots graduated at the Victorville Army Flying School on April 24, 1942. As the war progressed new planes were added to the Victorville Army Airfield. During 1943, the following aircraft were assigned to the Victorville Army Airfield: Lockheed C-60A, Douglas C-47 Skytrain, C-53 Skytrooper troop transport, L-4 Grasshopper, Piper L-4 Grasshopper, Aeronca L-3, PT-13 Kaydet, and CG-4A glider. In March 1944 a new unit with new planes were added to the Victorville Army Airfield. The 36th Flight Training Wing brought: Bell P-39 Airacobra, Consolidated B-24 Liberator and North American B-25 Mitchell. With Victory in Europe on May 1, 1945, and Victory over Japan on September 2, 1945, the Victorville Army Airfield ended all training on October 12, 1945. Over 30,000 troops were trained at the Victorville Army Airfields during World War II. The Mojave Desert is ideal for the storage of airplanes, so the Victorville Army Airfield became a storage and storage care base of the 2756th Air Base Squadron. All types of aircraft were stored at the base, but most planes were Boeing B-29 Superfortress, used by the US till 1960. Also a stored were a number of Beechcraft AT-7 and AT-11 Kansan.

For the Korean War the Victorville Army Airfield reopened on October 10, 1950. The base was renamed George Air Force Base after Brigadier General Harold Huston George (1892-1942), a World War I ace pilot, killed during WW2 accident at Darwin, Northern Territory, Australia 29 April 1942.

- Victorville Army Airfield auxiliary fields were built in 1941 using the same plan as Victorville Army Airfield, four runways in a triangle construction. The Airfield were used for take off and landing training. Auxiliary Airfields of Victorville AAF were:

== Hawes Auxiliary Airfield ==
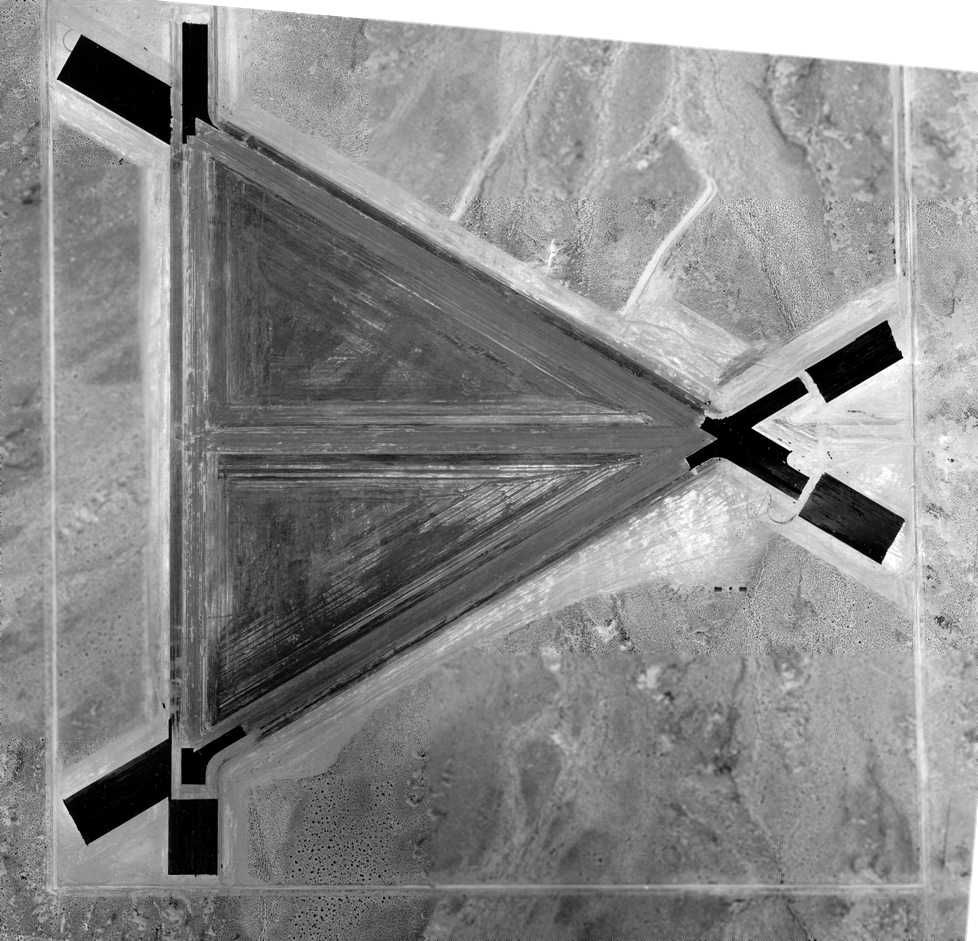
US Army's Hawes Auxiliary Airfield in 1943

Hawes Auxiliary Airfield (No 1) was an auxiliary field of the Victorville Army Air Field. Built in 1941 with four runways in a triangle shape, three 5,600 foot runways a one 4,912 runway in the center. No support structures were built as the field was only used for take off and landing training. Hawes Auxiliary Field was located near Kramer Hills, California, just south of California State Route 58, between Hinkley, California and Kramer, California at 34°55′30″N 117°22′27″W at an elevation of 2318 feet. During the Cold War, in 1965, to the south of the Hawes Auxiliary Airfield the US Air Force built a radio relay station for the Survivable Low Frequency Communications System made by Westinghouse Electric Corporation. The Hawes Radio Relay Site was called the USAF Survivable Low Frequency Communications System Site, Hawes. Built at the site was a 1,200 foot guide wire radio tower. The Hawes Radio Relay Site came under the command of the nearby Edwards Air Force Base. The runways were not used and were abandoned. The radio relay site closed in 1985 and the tower removed in late 1986. The site was abandoned, with just ruins remaining, creating an attractive nuisance. In 2008 the government removed much of the attractive nuisance, with only a few small ruins remaining, there is still a faint outline of the four runways.

== Helendale Auxiliary Airfield ==
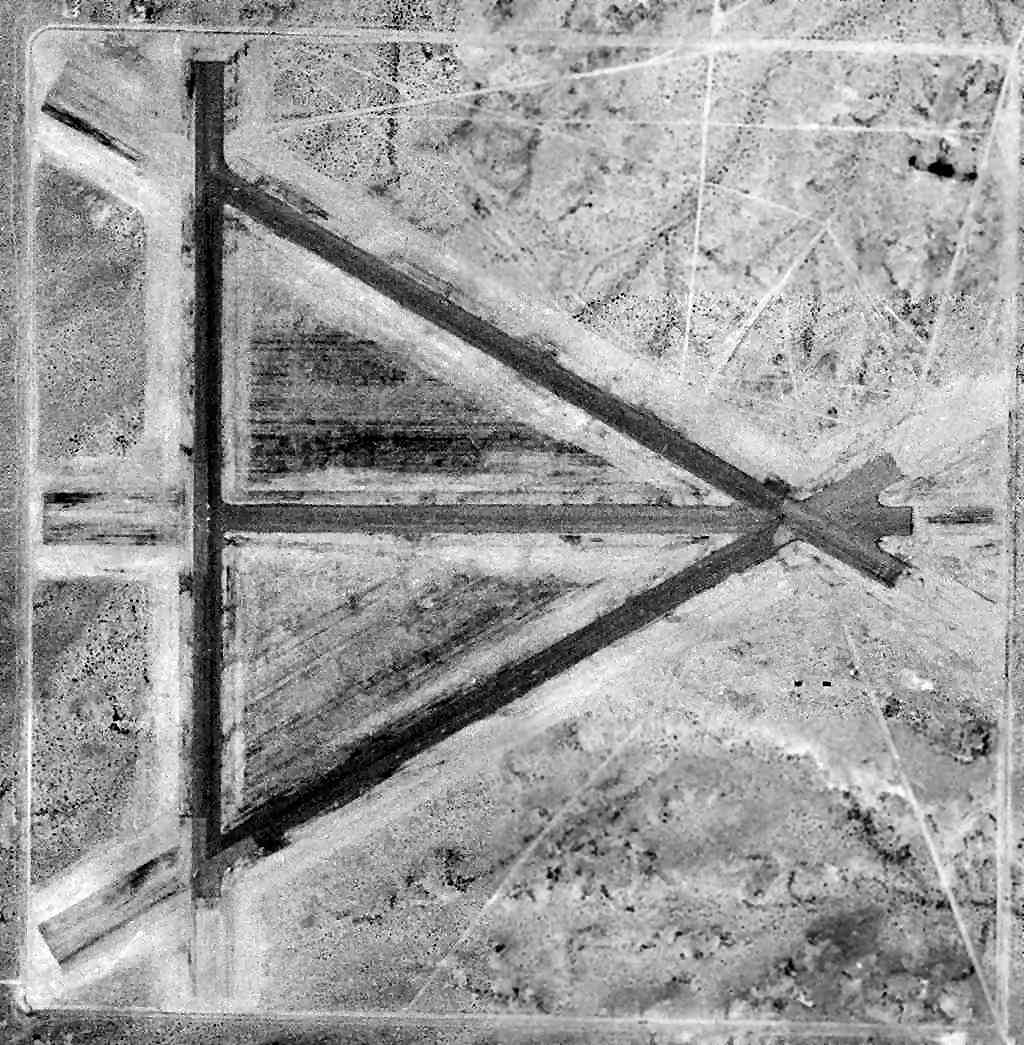
Helendale Auxiliary Airfield, in a 1952 USGS photo

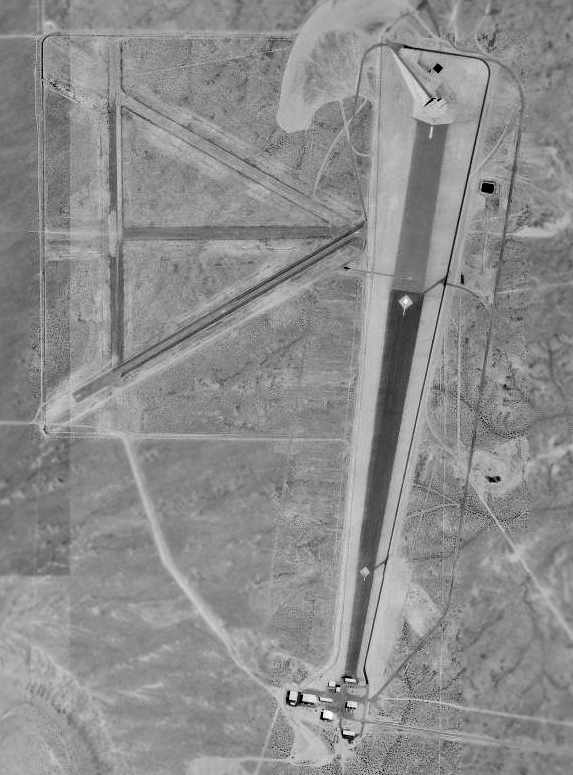
Lockheed Helendale Radar Cross Section Facility in a 1994 USGS photo

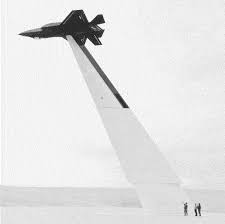
Lockheed Martin X-35 testing at Helendale Avionics Facility in May 2000, US Navy photo

Helendale Auxiliary Airfield (No 2) was built in 1941 for training pilots from Victorville Army Airfield during World War II. No support buildings were placed at the site, as the runways were used for the take off and landing training. Helendale Auxiliary Airfield is located just south of California State Route 58 and just north of the town of Helendale, California, at 34°49′40″N 117°18′18″W at an elevation of 2508 feet. The three sides of triangle runways are 4,459 feet long. After the war, in 1948 the US Army Airfield was used as the Helendale Airport, a private airport. In 1958 there were a number of near collisions around Helendale Airport and El Mirage Field, the FAA did a study to find the cause. On March 19, 1971, a Rockwell Aero Commander 560 coming from Van Nuys, California, on a test flight crashed approaching Helendale Airport, the speed of the plane was too slow. The two aboard the plane were killed in the crash. It was found that the pilot was not familiar enough with aircraft.

=== Helendale Avionics Facility ===
Helendale Avionics Facility or Lockheed Helendale Radar Cross Section Facility or Helendale Measurement Facility was built in 1983 by Lockheed Martin Skunk Works, who closed and took over the Helendale Airport. Lockheed built a radar cross-section testing facility at the site. In 1985 the Lockheed Martin Aerospace company built hydraulic system to raise planes and prototype of planes out of the ground from doors installed at the end of one of the runways. This minimized the viewing time of the prototype planes. The site is used to test stealth technology of stealth aircraft, like: the Lockheed F-117 Nighthawk Lockheed Martin F-22 Raptor, Northrop Grumman X-47B and the Northrop Grumman B-2 Spirit. On the north side of the facility is a 70-foot tower that hold an hydraulic elevator antenna array, with different radar antennas. Planes are tested using a variety for radar frequencies. Lockheed repaved one of the four old runways for the test site and added night lighting. Lockheed Martin Skunk Works owns the site.

== Mirage Auxiliary Airfield ==
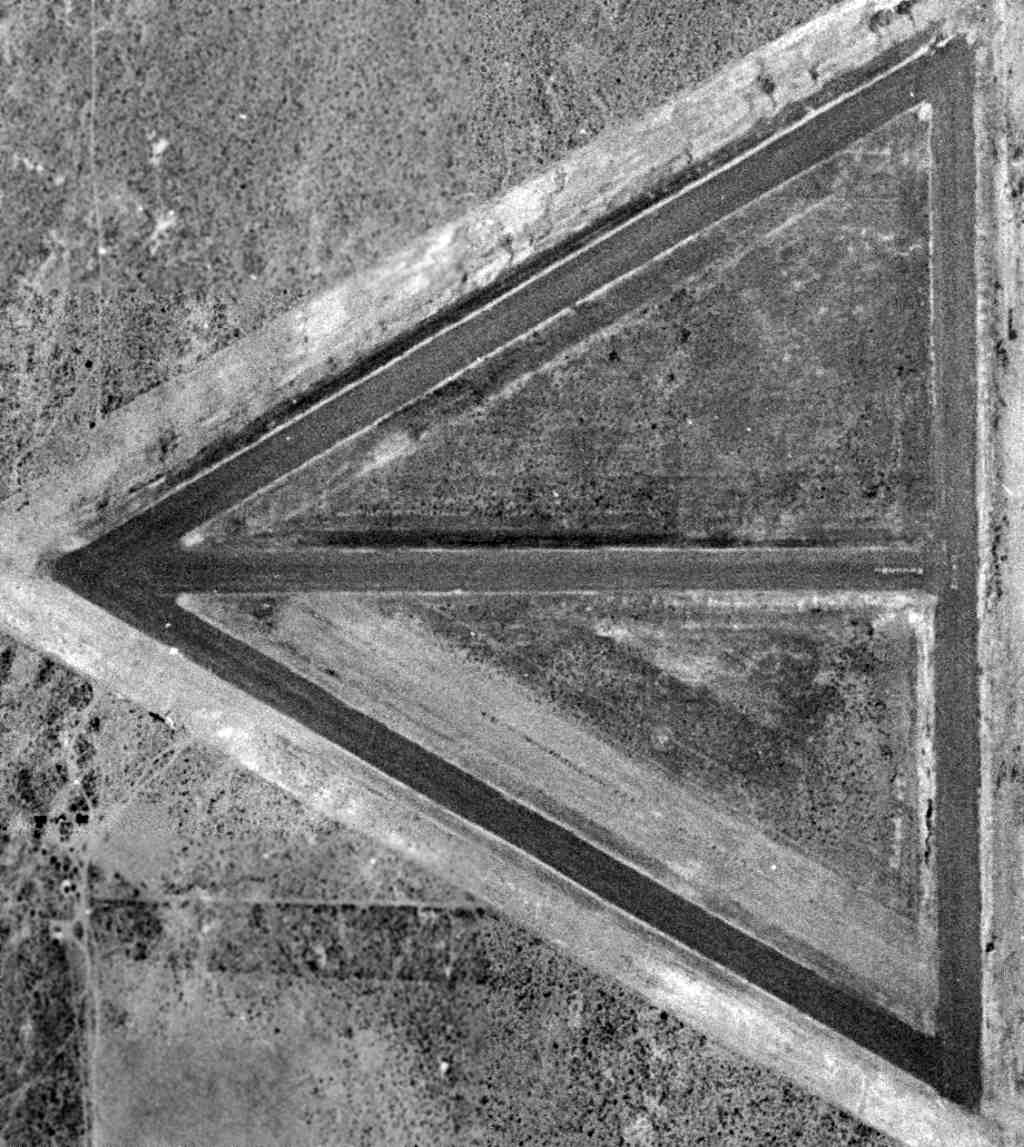
Mirage Auxiliary Airfield in 1952

Mirage Auxiliary Airfield (No 3) was used by the Victorville Army Airfield during World War II for training pilots and crews. Mirage Auxiliary Airfield is located just north of California State Route 18 and just north of the city of El Mirage, California, at 34°37′29″N 117°35′59″W at an elevation of 2,860 ft (870 m). To the southwest is the Grey Butte Field Airport. The US Army acquired 1,292.72 acres (523.15 ha) for the airfield from the Department of the Interior which held title to the public land. The Mirage Auxiliary Airfield was built in triangle shape with four paved runways. Mirage Auxiliary Airfield was built on a dry lake bed to train pilots in take off and landing. Surrounded by the dry lake was ideal for the training of Waco CG-4 glider pilots. Gliders were taken off by the Douglas C-47 Skytrain Cargo aircraft. After the war on December 6, 1946, the Mirage Auxiliary Airfield became a civil airfield owned by William G. Briegleb, called El Mirage Field, a place for gliders and glider training. The Briegleb BG-12 and the Briegleb BG-6 were popular glider at the site in the 1950s, designed by William G. Briegleb of the Briegleb Glider Company. Many glider records were set using the El Mirage Field, called also the El Mirage Glider Port. Regional and National glider competitions were held there. In 1977 Christopher Woods, student at the California Institute of the Fine Arts Film School, shot a film about soaring called El Mirage. The short documentary film is about the 43rd US Unlimited Class Soaring Nationals competitions. In May 1979 Walt Disney studios shot part of the movie The Last Flight of Noah's Ark about a fictional B-29 plane called Fertile Myrtle at El Mirage Field. One of the hangars was renamed Stoney's Air Service Freight for the Disney films. In 1985 the El Mirage Field closed to public use and was leased by General Atomics and is now used for testing drones aircraft and airborne sensors. General Atomics repaved the east–west runway for it test flights. In 2002 the site was renamed El Mirage Flight Test Facility. It also became an aircraft boneyard for storage and sell of use plane parts. In 2015 General Atomics built a new east–west runway parallel to the old Mirage Auxiliary Airfield.

== Grey Butte Auxiliary Airfield ==
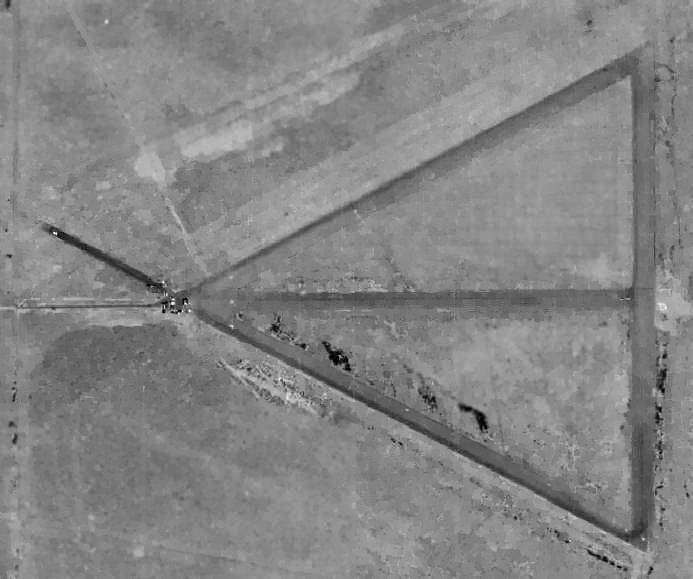
Grey Butte Airfield in 1968, to the left is the radar cross section testing

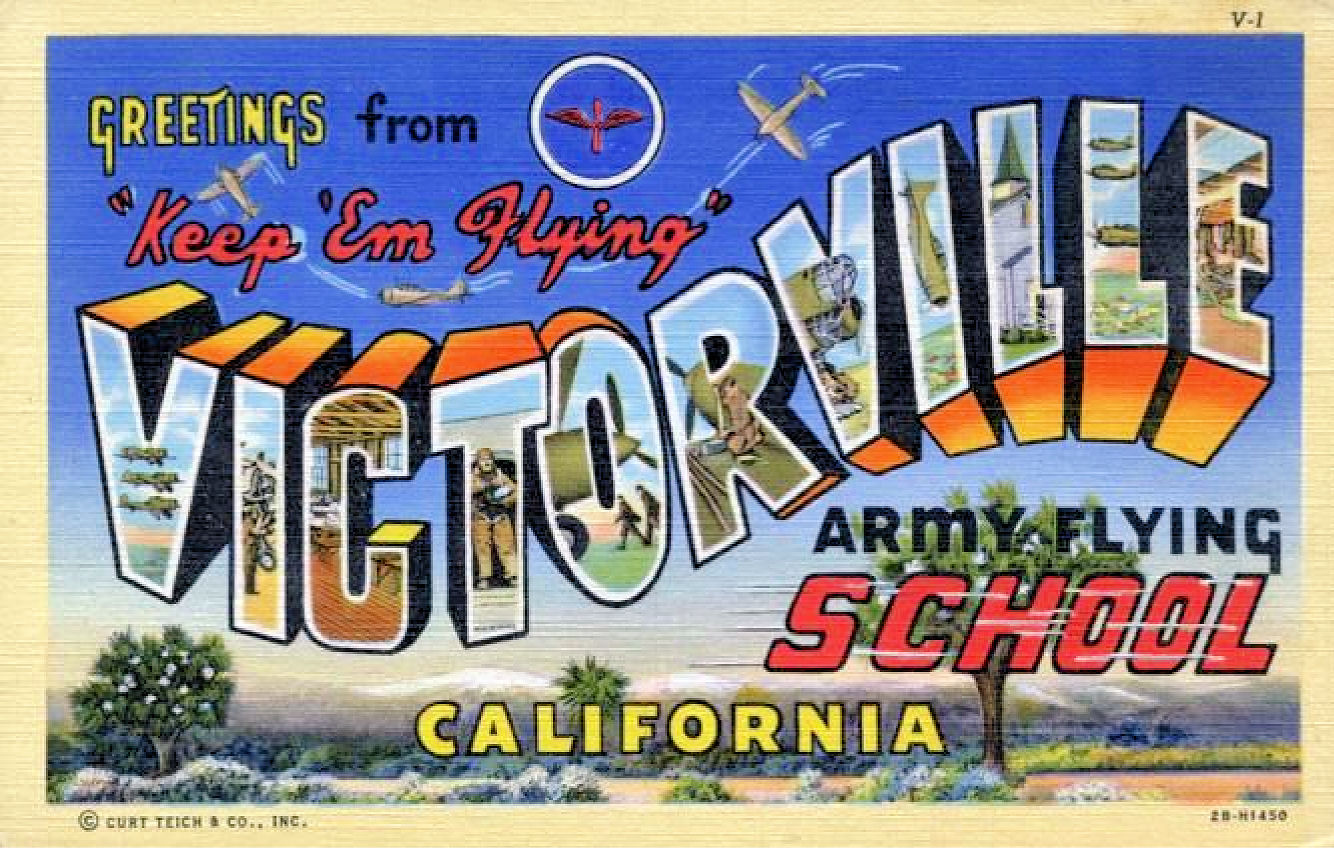
1943 Postcard from Victorville Army Airfield California

Grey Butte Auxiliary Airfield (No 4) was a satellite airfield built in 1941 for training pilots from Victorville Army Airfield during World War II. Grey Butte Auxiliary Airfield is located north of Piñon Hills, California, and southwest of El Mirage, California, and 25 miles east of Palmdale, California, at 34°34′00″N 117°40′25″W, at an elevation of 3,028 ft (923 m). The Grey Butte Auxiliary Airfield was built in 1941 in triangle shape with four 3,700 ft (1,100 m) paved runways and center runway of 3,164 ft (964 m). No support buildings were placed at the site, as the runways were used for the take off and landing training. Mobile lights were installed for night training. Starting in 1944 Marine aircrews used Grey Butte for training with planes from Mojave Marine Corps Air Station (MCAS) this was to prepare for Aircraft carrier landings in the Pacific Ocean theater of World War II during 1944 and 1945. A few Marine planes crashed at Grey Butte Airfield during this time. Training ended on October 12, 1945. In 1948 the Army closed the Grey Butte Auxiliary Airfield and it became the Grey Butte Field Airport, a civil airport. In the later 1950s, the airport closed and became classified as an "abandoned airport". In 1962 Grey Butte Field Airport was used as a port for aerial firefighting. Grey Butte was home to the Borate Air Company. Two pilots, Al Adolph and Harry Bernier, along with a plane mechanic were based in out Grey Butte Field. To the south of Grey Butte Field is the San Bernardino Mountains and team had a water reservoir to support fire fighting. In 1966 McDonnell Douglas leased the Grey Butte Field for radar cross section testing of planes and a radar antenna array was installed at the west end of the airfield. In 1975 a subscale demonstrator for the Lockheed F-117 model was tested at the site. General Atomics took over the site in 2001 for research and testing of the General Atomics MQ-1 Predator and General Atomics MQ-9 Reaper. The original east–west runway has been repaved and made longer to 8,000 ft (2,400 m). The other three original runways have been abandoned, but remain visible.

== Silver Peak Light Annex ==
Silver Peak Light Annex was a navigational beacon light installed in May 1943 to support the training of the airfields. Built on top of Silver Peak in the Silver Peak Mountain range at an elevation of 4,211 ft (1,284 m) at 34°38′03″N 117°18′28″W. The Silver Light Peak Annex is six miles north of Victorville, California. Nearby is Oro Grande, California, and the Oro Grande National Trails Highway.

== Victorville Precision Bombing ==
To support the training at the airfields the Army built the Victorville Precision Bombing Range No. 1 and the Victorville Precision Bombing Range No. 2. The 20 large targets were built from Apple Valley, California, out into the desert to support bomber training in precision bombing. The target had a 5-foot-wide (1.5 m) bullseye, surrounded by three circles with radii of 100 ft (30 m), 200 ft (61 m), and 300 ft (91 m). For night bombing flare pots and parachute flares were used until a night lighting system was installed. Each site was 640 acres (260 ha) and was used from 1942 to 1949. For training, M38A2 100-pound (45 kg) practice bombs, and M85 100-pound cement practice bombs and M47A2 100-pound sand-filled bombs were built with a small explosive charge. Victorville Precision Bombing Range Target 1 is located at 34°35′33″N 116°11′53″W in Apple Valley, California at the site of the current Walmat storage center. Victorville Precision Bombing Range Target 4 is located at 34°27′26″N 117°07′15″W in Apple Valley at Del Or Road and Laguna Seca Drive. Victorville Precision Bombing Range Target 6 is located at 34°30′08″N 116°52′18″W in Lucerne Valley, California. Victorville Precision Bombing Target No. 7 is located at 34°32′43″N 116°52′31″W on the current Fairlane Road in Lucerne Valley. Victorville Precision Bombing Target No. 7 is located at 34°28′12″N 116°35′07″W in Lucerne Valley. A faint outline of the targets can still be seen from the air.

== See also ==
- California during World War II
- California World War II Army Airfields
- Air Transport Command (World War II)
- Minter Army Airfield auxiliary fields
- Gardner Army Airfield auxiliary fields
