= Bowles (surname) =

Bowles is an English surname of Norman origin. Notable people with the surname include:

- Andrew Parker Bowles (born 1939), British military officer
- Benjamin F. Bowles (1869–1928), African American civil rights leader, high school principal, and founder and president of Douglass University
- Brian Bowles (baseball) (born 1976), US baseball player
- Brian Bowles (fighter) (born 1980), US mixed martial artist
- Camilla Parker Bowles (born 1947), former name of the Duchess of Cornwall, wife of King Charles
- Charles Bowles (disambiguation)
- Chester Bowles (1901–1986), US diplomat and politician
- Colin Bowles (pen name Colin Falconer (writer)) (born 1953), Australian writer
- Cory Bowles (born 1973), Canadian actor
- Cyril Bowles (1916–1999), English bishop
- Denzel Bowles (born 1989), American basketball player
- Edward Augustus Bowles (1865–1954), British horticulturalist and writer
- Erskine Bowles (born 1945), US businessman and politician
- Evelyn M. Bowles (1921–2016) US politician
- Frank Bowles, Baron Bowles (1902–1970), British solicitor and politician
- Gary Ray Bowles (1962–2019), American serial killer
- Hamish Bowles (born 1963), British magazine editor
- Ian Bowles (born circa 1966), environmentalist, businessman, politician, and former Massachusetts Secretary of Energy and Environmental Affairs
- Jack Bowles (1890–1971), English cricketer
- Jane Bowles (1917–1973), US writer
- Janet Payne Bowles (1872–1948), US artist
- Jesse G. Bowles (1921–2007), Justice of the Supreme Court of Georgia
- John Bowles (author) (1751–1819), English lawyer and author
- John Watts Bowles aka Du’wali Bowles (born 1756–1839), Texas Cherokee Indian Chief
- Jovan Bowles (born 1983), South African rugby player
- Leslie Bowles (1885–1954), Australian sculptor
- Lynn Bowles (born 1963), British radio reporter
- Martin Bowles, senior Australian public servant
- Michael Bowles (1909–1998), Irish conductor and composer
- Oliver Bowles (died c. 1646), English Presbyterian minister and divine
- Paul Bowles (1910–1999), US composer, author, and translator
- Paul Bowles (footballer) (1957–2017), English football player
- Peter Bowles (1936–2022), English actor
- Pinckney Downie Bowles (1835–1910), US lawyer and soldier
- Ralston Bowles (born 1952), US musician
- Richard Bowles (born 1978), English-born Australian long-distance runner
- Richard Spink Bowles (1912–1988), Canadian lawyer
- Rowan Bowles, Australian handbike cyclist
- Samuel Bowles (economist) (born 1939), US economist
- Samuel Bowles (journalist) (1826–1878), US journalist
- Sharon Bowles (born 1953), British politician
- Skipper Bowles (1919–1986), US politician
- Stan Bowles (1948–2024), English football player
- Sydney (Bowles) Mitford (1880–1963), matriarch of the Mitford family
- Thomas Gibson Bowles (1841--1922), British politician and publisher, father of Sydney Mitford
- Todd Bowles (born 1963), American football coach
- Tom Parker Bowles (born 1974), British writer
- Troy Bowles (born 2005), American football player
- Wayde Douglas Bowles (AKA Rocky Johnson) (1944–2020), Canadian wrestler, father of Dwayne Johnson

Fictional characters:

- "Sally Bowles", a short story in the 1939 novel Goodbye to Berlin by Christopher Isherwood
  - Sally Bowles, fictional character in the 1966 stage musical Cabaret, based on the novel
  - Sally Bowles, fictional character in the 1972 film Cabaret, based on the musical
- Snowy Bowles, fictional character in the television series Sweat, played by Heath Ledger

== See also ==
- Thomas Bowles (disambiguation)
- William Bowles (disambiguation)
- Bols (surname)
