= William Gunter =

William Gunter may refer to:

- Bill Gunter (born 1934), American politician from Florida
- William Gunter (martyr) (died 1588), Roman Catholic priest and martyr
- William A. Gunter (1871–1940), Alabama politician
- William B. Gunter (1919–1986), Georgia Supreme Court justice
