= Richard Burr =

American businessman and politician (born 1955)

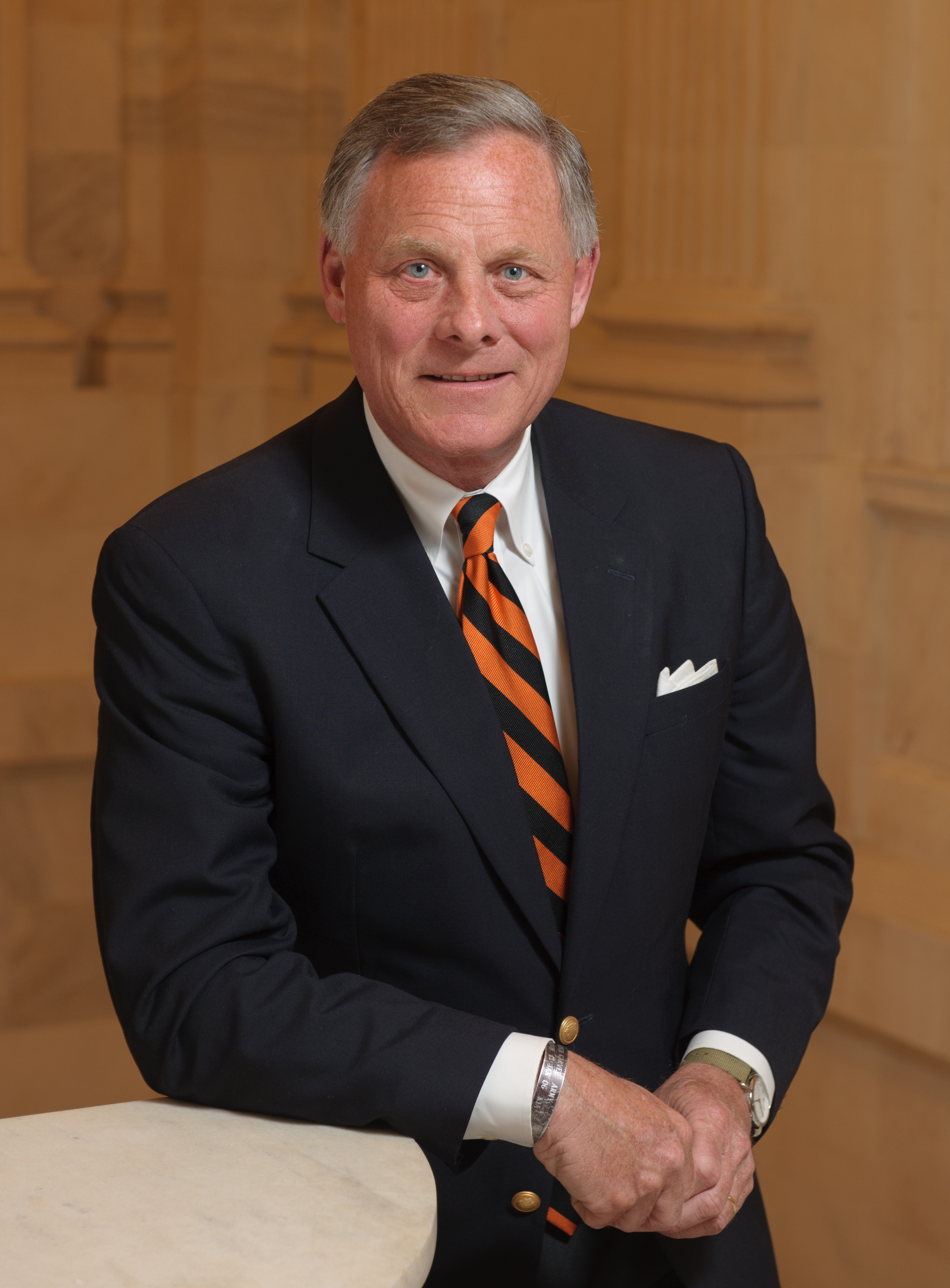
- Official portrait, 2015

Ranking Member of the Senate Health, Education, Labor and Pensions Committee; Chair of the Senate Intelligence Committee
- In office January 3, 2015 – May 15, 2020
- Preceded by: Dianne Feinstein
- Succeeded by: Marco Rubio (acting)

United States Senator from North Carolina
- In office January 3, 2005 – January 3, 2023
- Preceded by: John Edwards
- Succeeded by: Ted Budd

Member of the U.S. House of Representatives from North Carolina's 5th district
- In office January 3, 1995 – January 3, 2005
- Preceded by: Stephen L. Neal
- Succeeded by: Virginia Foxx

Personal details
- Born: Richard Mauze Burr; November 30, 1955 (age 70) Charlottesville, Virginia, U.S.
- Party: Republican
- Spouse: Brooke Fauth (m. 1984)
- Children: 2
- Education: Wake Forest University (BA)
- Burr's voice Burr on the 2018–2020 Intelligence Authorization Act. Recorded June 25, 2019

Richard Mauze Burr (born November 30, 1955) is an American businessman and politician who served as a United States senator from North Carolina from 2005 to 2023. A member of the Republican Party, Burr was previously a member of the United States House of Representatives from 1995 to 2005.

Born in Charlottesville, Virginia, Burr is a graduate of Wake Forest University. Before seeking elected office, he was a sales manager for a lawn equipment company. In 1994, he was elected to the U.S. House of Representatives for North Carolina's 5th congressional district as part of the Republican Revolution.

Burr was first elected to the United States Senate in 2004. From 2015 to 2020, he chaired the Senate Intelligence Committee. In 2016, he announced that he would not seek reelection in 2022. Burr temporarily stepped down as chair of the Intelligence Committee on May 15, 2020, amid an FBI investigation into allegations of insider trading during the COVID-19 pandemic. On January 19, 2021, the Department of Justice announced that the investigation had been closed, with no charges against Burr.

Burr was one of seven Republican senators to vote to convict Donald Trump of incitement of insurrection in his second impeachment trial.

== Early life, education, and business career ==
Burr was born on November 30, 1955, in Charlottesville, Virginia, the son of Martha (Gillum) and Rev. David Horace White Burr. In 1963, he moved to Winston-Salem, North Carolina He graduated from Richard J. Reynolds High School in Winston-Salem, North Carolina, in 1974 and earned a Bachelor of Arts degree in communications from Wake Forest University in 1978. In college, Burr played defensive back for the Wake Forest Demon Deacons football team. He is a member of Kappa Sigma fraternity.

Before running for Congress, Burr worked for 17 years as a sales manager for Carswell Distributing Company, a distributor of lawn equipment.

== U.S. House of Representatives ==
In 1992, Burr ran against incumbent Representative Stephen L. Neal for the seat in the Winston-Salem-based 5th District and lost. He ran again in 1994 after Neal chose not to seek reelection, and was elected in a landslide year for Republicans.

In the House, Burr authored the FDA Modernization Act of 1997. He also helped create the National Institute for Biomedical Imaging and Bioengineering. In the aftermath of the 9/11 attacks, he successfully sponsored amendments to improve defenses against bioterrorism.

As a representative, Burr co-sponsored, with Senator Kit Bond, an amendment to the Energy Policy Act of 2003 relaxing restrictions on the export of specific types of enriched uranium that were first enacted in the Schumer Amendment to the Energy Policy Act of 1992. The original Schumer amendment placed increased controls on U.S. civilian exports of weapons-grade highly enriched uranium (HEU) to encourage foreign users to switch to reactor-grade low-enriched uranium (LEU) for isotope production. HEU is attractive to terrorists because it can be used to create a simple nuclear weapon, while LEU cannot be used directly to make nuclear weapons. Burr's amendment allowed exports of HEU to five countries for creating medical isotopes.

Burr was reelected four times with no substantial opposition.

== U.S. Senate ==
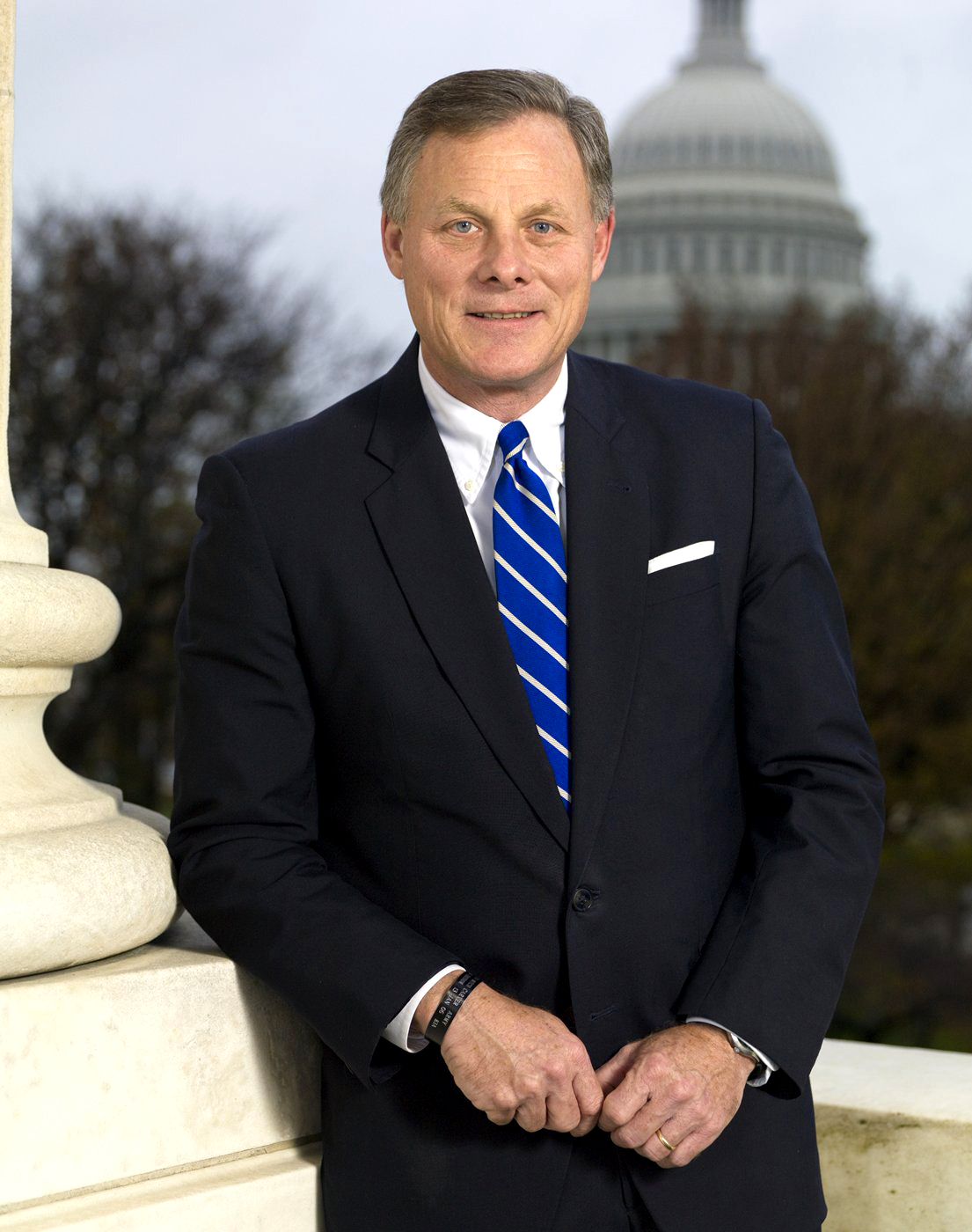
Burr during 111th United States Congress

=== Elections ===
==== 2004 ====
In July 2004, Burr won the Republican primary for the U.S. Senate seat vacated by John Edwards, who chose to not seek reelection while running for vice president as Democratic presidential nominee John Kerry's running mate in the 2004 presidential election.

Burr faced Democratic nominee Erskine Bowles and Libertarian Tom Bailey; he won the election with 52% of the vote. Burr was sworn in to the Senate on January 4, 2005.

==== 2010 ====
Burr defeated the Democratic nominee, North Carolina Secretary of State Elaine Marshall, 55% to 43%. He was the first Republican since Jesse Helms to be reelected to the U.S. Senate from North Carolina and the first incumbent senator from North Carolina receive a double-digit margin of victory since Sam Ervin's 1968 reelection. Burr's win also represented the first time that North Carolina reelected a senator to this seat since Ervin's 1968 victory, leading Burr to declare "the curse has been broken" on election night; Democrats and Republicans swapped control of the seat five times between 1968 and 2010.

==== 2016 ====
Burr defeated Democratic nominee Deborah K. Ross, 51% to 45%. Burr was an advisor for Donald Trump's successful 2016 presidential campaign.

==== 2022 ====
On July 20, 2016, while campaigning for a third Senate term, Burr announced that he would not seek a fourth term in 2022. He did not seek reelection in 2022.

Burr delivered a farewell address on the Senate floor on December 14, 2022, and his final term expired on January 3, 2023. He was succeeded by Ted Budd.

=== Tenure and political positions ===
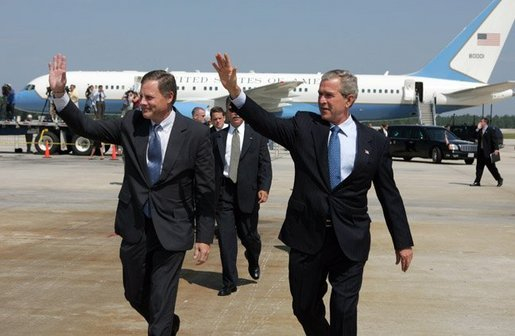
Burr with President George W. Bush, July 2004

In 2007, Burr ran for chair of the Senate Republican Conference, but lost to Senator Lamar Alexander of Tennessee by a vote of 31 to 16. In 2009, Senator Jon Kyl of Arizona, the Senate Republican Whip, appointed Burr Chief Deputy Whip in the 111th Congress. In 2007, Burr was named a deputy whip. In 2011, he announced his intention to seek the post of minority whip, the number two Republican position in the Senate, but he dropped out of the race in 2012.

As of January 2021, Burr's votes aligned with President Trump's positions about 89% of the time. He voted against the majority of his party in about 1.5% of votes. The American Conservative Union's Center for Legislative Accountability gave Burr a lifetime rating of 84.22.

Burr served as a member of the board of Brenner Children's Hospital and the West Point Board of Visitors.

==== Campaign finance ====
Burr opposed the DISCLOSE Act, which would have required political ads include information about who funded the ad. He supported the U.S. Supreme Court decision Citizens United, which allowed political action committees to spend an unlimited amount of money during elections so long as they were not in direct coordination with candidates.

==== Economy ====
During his time in office, Burr was critical of financial regulations; he strongly opposed, and voted against, the Dodd–Frank Wall Street Reform and Consumer Protection Act of 2010 and the creation of the Consumer Financial Protection Bureau. In 2018, he voted for legislation that partly repealed the Dodd–Frank reforms.

In fall 2008, during the Great Recession, Burr said he was going to an ATM every day and taking out cash because he thought the financial system would soon collapse. In 2009, in response to press about his experience, Burr said that he would do the same thing again next time.

Burr was a signatory of the Taxpayer Protection Pledge, vowing to oppose to tax increases for any reason. He opposed raising taxes on businesses or high-income people to fund public services.

In 2013, Burr criticized Senator Ted Cruz and other Republican colleagues for filibustering the passage of the fiscal year 2014 federal budget (thereby precipitating a federal government shutdown) in an effort to defund the Affordable Care Act. Burr called the approach of Cruz and allies "the height of hypocrisy" and the "dumbest idea I've ever heard."

Burr opposed ratification of the Trans-Pacific Partnership (TPP) and supported the adoption of the United States–Mexico–Canada Agreement.

In March 2015, Burr voted for an amendment to establish a deficit-neutral reserve fund to allow employees to earn paid sick time. He opposed raising the federal minimum wage.

In 2016, Burr supported the privatization of Social Security.

==== Environment and climate change ====
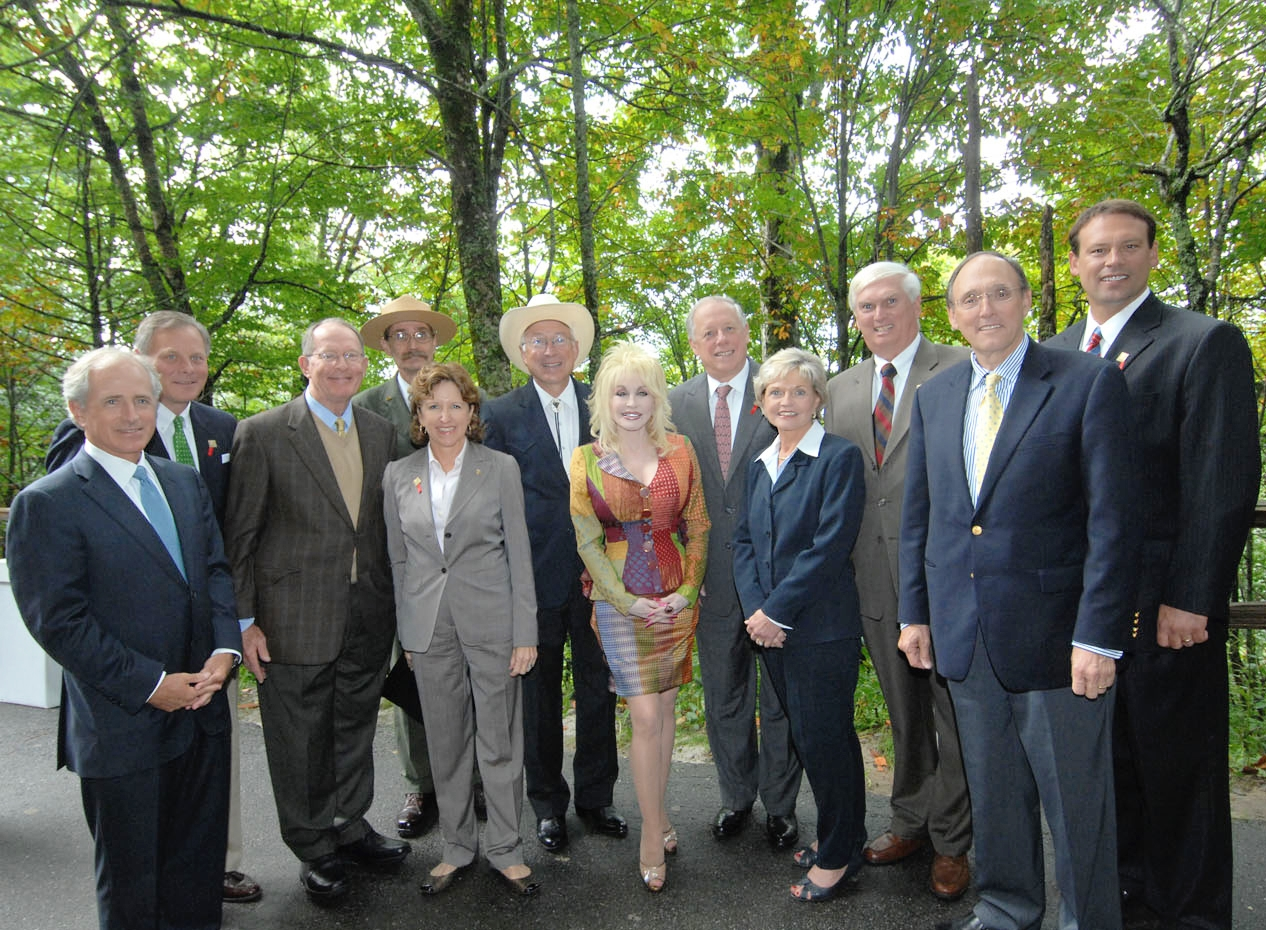
U.S. Senators Bob Corker, Richard Burr, Lamar Alexander, Kay Hagan, and Congressman John Duncan among others with Dolly Parton at Great Smoky Mountains National Park in 2009

Burr was one of 20 senators to vote against the Omnibus Public Land Management Act of 2009, a public land management and conservation bill. He supported renewal of the 1965 Land and Water Conservation Fund.

During his time in office, Burr did not accept the scientific consensus on climate change; he acknowledged that climate change is occurring, but expressed doubt that it is caused by human activity. He opposed regulations to limit greenhouse gas emissions, and opposed federal grants or subsidies to encourage the productions of renewable energy. In 2015, he voted against a measure declaring that climate change is real and that human activity significantly contributes to it. In 2013, Burr voted for a measure expressing opposition to a federal tax or fee on carbon emissions. He voted in favor of the Keystone XL pipeline.

In 2017, Burr voted to repeal the Stream Protection Rule as well as rules requiring energy companies to reduce waste, reduce emissions, and disclose payments from foreign governments. In 2019, he voted to repeal an Environmental Protection Agency (EPA) rule regarding emissions. He supported lowering federal taxes on alternative fuels and the initiation of a hydropower project on the Yadkin River in Wilkes County, North Carolina. In 2011, Burr voted to abolish the EPA and merge it with the U.S. Department of Energy.

In 2019, Burr and nine Republican colleagues founded the Roosevelt Conservation Caucus, which advocates "market-based approaches" to environmental problems; the caucus is supported by the American Conservation Coalition.

==== Education ====
In 2017, Burr voted to confirm Betsy DeVos as Education Secretary; she was confirmed by vote of 51–50, with Vice President Mike Pence casting a tie-breaking vote after the Senate deadlocked. DeVos's family donated $43,200 to Burr's 2016 reelection campaign.

Burr typically voted against any increased funding for federal education projects, and in 2016 said he opposed increasing Pell Grants and other forms of student financial aid, including new subsidies aimed at helping students refinance their loans. He supported the goals of charter schools and supported legislation requiring public schools to allow school prayer. He voted for the No Child Left Behind Act of 2001.

==== Foreign policy ====
Burr has been described as a foreign policy hawk. In 2002, he voted for the Authorization for Use of Military Force Against Iraq Resolution, which authorized the U.S. invasion of Iraq. Burr supported President Bush's troop surge in Iraq in January 2007, saying that the effort to counter the insurgency would increase "security and stability" in Iraq. In February 2019, he voted for a measure disapproving of the withdrawal of U.S. military forces from Afghanistan and Syria. In February 2020, Burr voted against a measure restricting Trump from initiating military action against Iran without congressional approval.

In 2017, Burr co-sponsored the Israel Anti-Boycott Act (s. 720), which would have made it a federal crime for Americans to encourage or participate in boycotts against Israel and Israeli settlements in the West Bank to protest actions of the Israeli government.

In 2018 and 2019, Burr opposed legislation to prohibit U.S. arms sales to Saudi Arabia and the United Arab Emirates, and to end U.S. military assistance to the Saudi Arabian-led intervention in Yemen.

==== Gun policy ====
In 2016, the National Rifle Association Political Victory Fund gave Burr an "A+" grade and endorsed him for reelection for backing pro-gun legislation. The NRA extensively supported Burr's election campaigns. In the 2016 election, the NRA spent nearly $7 million to support Burr against his Democratic rival Deborah Ross; over his career, Burr received more monetary support from the NRA than almost any other member of Congress Burr used the same media consultant as the NRA for his political ads.

In 2013, Burr voted against gun control measures, including extended background checks to internet and gun show weapons purchases and an assault weapons ban. He sponsored legislation to stop the Department of Veterans Affairs from adding the names of veterans to the National Instant Criminal Background Check System (NICS) if the department had assigned a financial fiduciary to take care of the veteran's finances due to mental incompetence, unless a judge or magistrate deemed them a danger. People added to the NICS system are normally barred from purchasing or owning a firearm. Burr voted against Senator Dianne Feinstein's "no fly no buy" bill, but supported a Republican alternative measure written by Senator John Cornyn (R-Texas) which proposed a 72-hour delay on gun sales to people whose names have been on a federal terror watch list within the past five years."

Speaking privately on the topic of guns to a group of Republican volunteers in Mooresville, North Carolina, Burr joked that a magazine cover of Hillary Clinton ought to have had a bullseye on it. He quickly apologized for the comment.

In 2022, Burr was one of ten Republican senators to support a bipartisan agreement on gun control, which involved a red flag provision, a support for state crisis intervention orders, funding for school safety resources, stronger background checks for buyers under the age of 21, and penalties for straw purchases.

==== Health policy ====
Burr voted against the Affordable Care Act (ACA) in December 2009, and against the Health Care and Education Reconciliation Act of 2010. In 2014, Burr and Senator Orrin Hatch sponsored the Patient Choice, Affordability, Responsibility and Empowerment Act, which would have repealed and replaced the ACA. In 2017, Burr voted for the Republican legislation to replace major parts of the ACA; the legislation failed in the Senate on a 50–49 vote.

In 2012, Burr co-sponsored a plan to overhaul Medicare; his bill would have raised the Medicare eligibility age from 65 to 67 over time and shifted more seniors to private insurance. The proposal would have begun "a transition to a system dominated by private insurance plans."

Burr opposed legislation to allow the Food and Drug Administration (FDA) to regulate the tobacco industry, which is economically important in North Carolina, and unsuccessfully tried to filibuster the Family Smoking Prevention and Tobacco Control Act of 2009. In 2010, he introduced the National Uniformity for Food Act, an unsuccessful piece of legislation that would have banned states from forcing manufacturers to include labels other than those required by the FDA on consumables and health and beauty products.

==== Social issues ====
In 2018, Burr voted in favor of legislation to ban abortion after 20 weeks of pregnancy. He supported parental notification laws and efforts to restrict federal funding of Planned Parenthood. He voted to define a pregnancy as carrying an "unborn child" from the moment of conception. He voted to prevent minors who have crossed state lines from getting an abortion, as well as to ensure parents are notified if their child does get an abortion. He voted to extend the federal prohibition on tax dollars being used for abortions by preventing the U.S. Department of Health and Human Services from giving grants to any organization that performs abortions at any of its locations.

Burr opposed the legalization of cannabis for both medical and recreational use. He stated that there should be greater enforcement of current anti-cannabis federal laws in all states, even when cannabis is legal as a matter of state law.

Burr voted for the Don't Ask, Don't Tell Repeal Act of 2010, the only Southern Republican senator to do so. The bill repealed the Defense Department's don't ask, don't tell policy of employment discrimination against openly gay individuals. Burr and John Ensign were the only senators who voted against cloture but for passage; Burr said he opposed taking up the issue of DADT repeal amid wars in Iraq and Afghanistan, but voted in favor of the bill anyway, becoming one of eight Republicans who backed the final repeal bill.

Burr supported a constitutional ban on same-sex marriage, but in 2013 said that he believed the law on same-sex marriage should be left to the states. In 2013, he voted against the Employment Non-Discrimination Act, a bill to extend federal employment discrimination protections to LGBT persons. In 2015, Burr was one of 11 Senate Republicans to vote in favor of allowing same-sex spouses to have access to federal Social Security and veterans' benefits.

Burr supported policies to regulate bathroom access according to sex listed on birth certificates, but sought to distance himself from H.B. 2, North Carolina's controversial "bathroom legislation".

Burr voted to reauthorize the Violence Against Women Act in 2013.

Burr voted against earmarking money for programs aimed at reducing teen pregnancy He has stated he supports giving employers the right to restrict access to birth control coverage of employees if it is for moral reasons.

In December 2018, Burr was one of 12 Republican senators to vote against the cloture motion on the First Step Act, a criminal justice reform measure altering federal sentencing laws, but ultimately voted for the law.

In 2022, Burr was one of 12 Republican senators to vote in support of the Respect for Marriage Act.

==== Judiciary ====
In 2016, Burr and other Republican senators opposed holding a nomination hearing for Judge Merrick Garland, whom President Obama nominated to fill a vacancy on the Supreme Court of the United States; he also refused to have a customary meeting with Garland. In 2016, Burr blocked consideration of Obama's nomination of Patricia Timmons-Goodson to fill an 11-year vacancy on U.S. District Court for the Eastern District of North Carolina. He expressed pride that his actions preventing Timmons-Goodson's confirmation created the longest federal court bench vacancy in U.S. history.

In 2016, Burr said he would attempt to block any future Supreme Court nominations made by then-Democratic nominee Hillary Clinton if she won the presidency in 2016, adding, "I am going to do everything I can do to make sure four years from now, we still got an opening on the Supreme Court."

Burr voted to confirm Trump's Supreme Court nominees Neil Gorsuch and Brett Kavanaugh. Two days before Christine Blasey Ford was scheduled to testify before the Senate, Burr issued a statement supporting Kavanaugh's nomination despite her testimony. Ford accused Kavanaugh of sexually assaulting her when they were high-school students.

==== Privacy and surveillance ====
In 2015, as chair of the Senate Intelligence Committee, Burr proposed a five-year extension of the Patriot Act, which was set to expire in May 2015. Though he originally supported legislation which would reauthorize Patriot Act programs without any reforms, he later softened his position in light of House opposition. Burr was a prominent advocate of retaining language in any reauthorizing legislation to allow the National Security Agency to continue bulk collection of metadata of private telephone records. Ultimately, the Senate rejected controversial amendments in line with Burr's proposals introduced by then-Senate Majority Leader Mitch McConnell, and Congress passed the USA Freedom Act, signed into law in June 2015, which instead allowed the NSA to subpoena the data from telephone companies.

In 2016, after the FBI–Apple encryption dispute, Burr and Senator Dianne Feinstein circulated a draft bill (which was subsequently leaked) that would create a "backdoor" mandate, requiring technology companies to design encryption so as to provide law enforcement with user data in an "intelligible format" when required to do so by court order.

==== President Trump ====
Burr was a national security adviser to the Trump campaign. He stated that Trump "aligns perfectly" with the Republican Party. When asked on the campaign trail about Trump's offensive remarks about women, Burr said Trump should be forgiven a few mistakes and given time to change.

In 2017, Burr said of Trump's firing of FBI Director James Comey, "I have found Director Comey to be a public servant of the highest order."

As chair of the United States Senate Select Committee on Intelligence, Burr led that chamber's investigation into Russian interference in the 2016 United States elections. In March 2017, Comey briefed congressional leaders and Intelligence Committee heads on the ongoing investigation into Russian interference in the election. That briefing included "an identification of the principal U.S. subjects of the investigation." The Mueller report found that Burr had then corresponded with the Trump White House a week later about the Russia probes, with the White House Counsel's office, led by Don McGahn, apparently receiving "information about the status of the FBI investigation."

In December 2019, amid an impeachment inquiry into Trump over the Trump–Ukraine scandal (Trump's request that Ukraine announce an investigation into his political rival Joe Biden), Burr pushed the debunked conspiracy theory that Ukraine meddled in the 2016 election. Burr said, "There's no difference in the way Russia put their feet, early on, on the scale—being for one candidate and everybody called it meddling—and how the Ukrainian officials did it." During Trump's first impeachment trial, Burr said he would oppose removing Trump from office even if a quid pro quo was confirmed. He opposed calling Trump's former National Security Adviser John Bolton as a witness at the Senate trial; Bolton had written that Trump had tied U.S. security aid to Ukraine to the country's taking action against Biden. Burr voted to acquit Trump on the two charges of obstruction of Congress and abuse of power.

On February 9, 2021, Burr voted against the constitutionality of Trump's second impeachment trial. Nevertheless, on February 13, Burr was one of seven Republicans to vote to convict. On February 16, the North Carolina Republican Party censured him for the vote.

On August 13, 2024, despite having voted to impeach him, Burr said he planned to vote for Trump for president in November.

==== Insider trading allegations ====
In early February 2020, just before the COVID-19 market crash, Burr sold more than $1.6 million of stock in 33 transactions during a period when, as head of the Senate Intelligence Committee, he was being briefed daily regarding potential health threats from COVID-19. He sold 95% of the holdings in his Individual Retirement Account (IRA). According to the FBI, Burr's sales six days before "a dramatic and substantial" downturn in the stock market allowed him to profit more than $164,000 and avoid $87,000 in losses. The stocks sold included several considered vulnerable to economic downturns, such as hotel chains. Burr's brother-in-law Gerald Fauth also subsequently sold stocks; according to the Securities and Exchange Commission, Burr had a 50-second phone conversation with Fauth in February 2020, immediately after which Fauth sold shares.

On March 19, before Burr's stock trades were publicly known, NPR reported Burr had warned a private organization in North Carolina on February 27 about the dangers of the virus, likely containment steps, and their extreme economic impacts on stocks and businesses, just two weeks after the stock sale. The advice contradicted his comments in a Fox News op-ed with Lamar Alexander on February 7. The organization he spoke to was Tar Heel Circle, a nonpartisan club of businesses and organizations that costs between $500 and $10,000 to join and assures members "enjoy interaction with top leaders and staff from Congress, the administration, and the private sector."

Later on March 19, the nonprofit investigative organization ProPublica broke news of Burr's stock transactions. When asked for comment, a spokesperson first "express[ed] displeasure with NPR's earlier characterizations” of the February 27 Tar Heel Circle event, and later added, "As the situation continues to evolve daily, he has been deeply concerned by the steep and sudden toll this pandemic is taking on our economy." The Raleigh News & Observer editorial board criticized Burr's conduct: "Burr had a clear grasp of the danger ahead. Why did he only share it with a group whose member companies… contributed more than $100,000… to Burr’s last re-election campaign? Why didn’t Burr provide his assessment to all the constituents he is supposed to serve, as well as the national media?" Fox News pundit Tucker Carlson called for Burr's resignation in the face of the allegations.

The Department of Justice, in coordination with the Securities and Exchange Commission, launched a formal probe into the stock sales made during the early days of the coronavirus epidemic by several legislators, including Burr. Burr was also sued by a shareholder for alleged STOCK Act violations.

On May 13, the FBI served a search warrant on Burr at his Washington residence and seized his cellphone. He temporarily stepped down as chair of the Intelligence Committee the next day, taking effect on May 15.

On January 19, 2021, the last full day of the Trump administration, the Justice Department informed Burr that it would not pursue charges against him.

The FBI's search warrant affidavit was partially unsealed in September 2022, after litigation by the Los Angeles Times and the Reporters Committee for Freedom of the Press.

Burr was one of only three senators to oppose the STOCK Act of 2012, which prohibits members of Congress and congressional staff from using nonpublic information in securities trading.

==== 2021 storming of the United States Capitol ====
On May 28, 2021, Burr abstained from voting on the creation of an independent commission to investigate the January 6 United States Capitol attack.

=== Committee assignments ===
- Committee on Finance
- Committee on Health, Education, Labor, and Pensions (Ranking)
  - Subcommittee on Children and Families
  - Subcommittee on Employment and Workplace Safety
  - Subcommittee on Primary Health and Retirement Security
- Select Committee on Intelligence
- Special Committee on Aging

=== Caucus membership ===
- Congressional Boating Caucus (Co-chair)
- International Conservation Caucus
- Sportsmen's Caucus
- Weapons of Mass Destruction Terrorism Caucus
- Congressional NextGen 9-1-1 Caucus

== Post-Senate career ==
Upon leaving Congress, Burr took a job at law firm DLA Piper as a principal policy advisor and chair of the Health Policy Strategic Consulting Practice.

In 2025, Burr introduced Tulsi Gabbard at her confirmation hearing to be Director of National Intelligence, his first visit to the Capitol since his term ended.

== Personal life ==
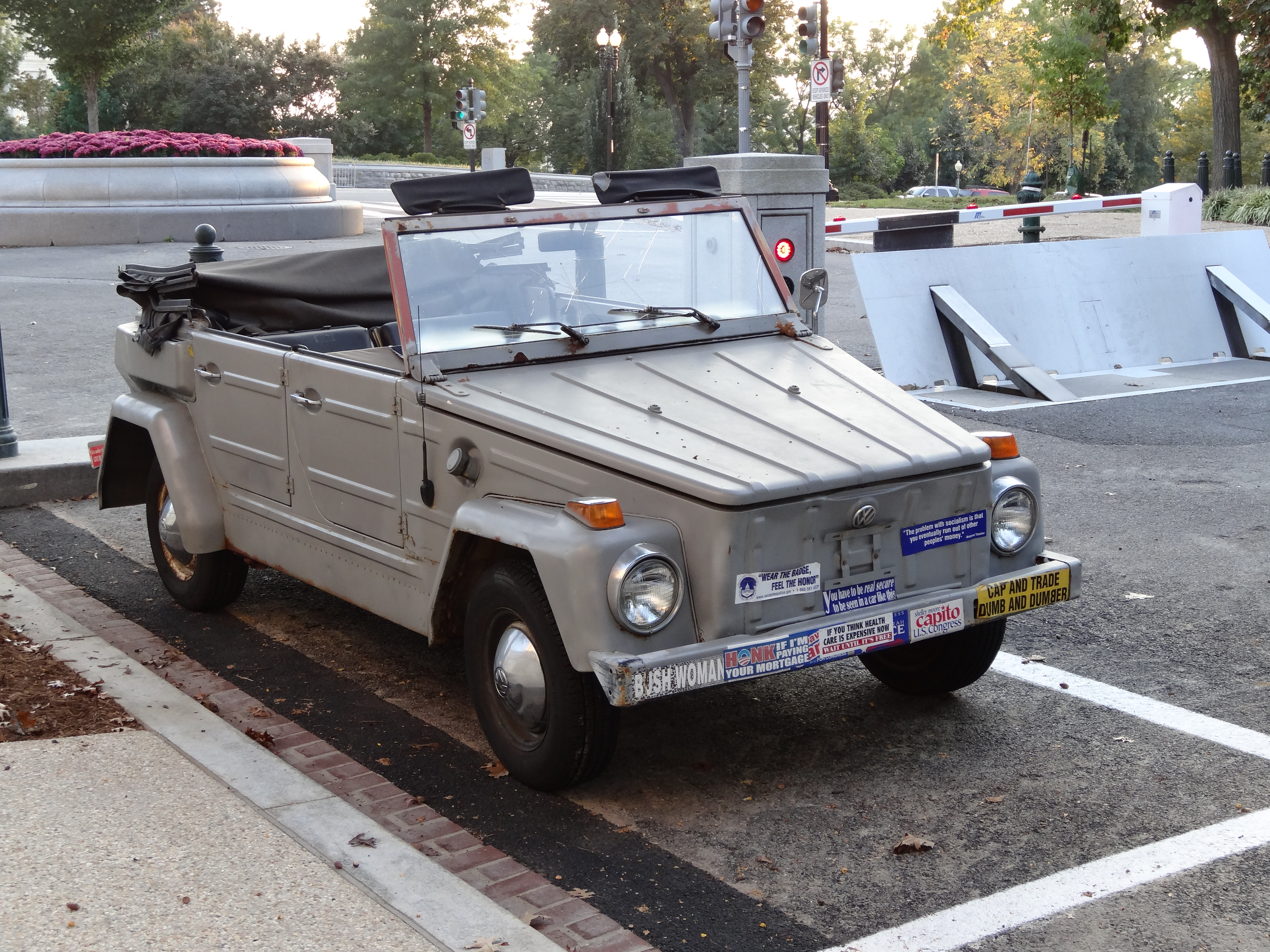
Burr's iconic 1973 VW Thing, front

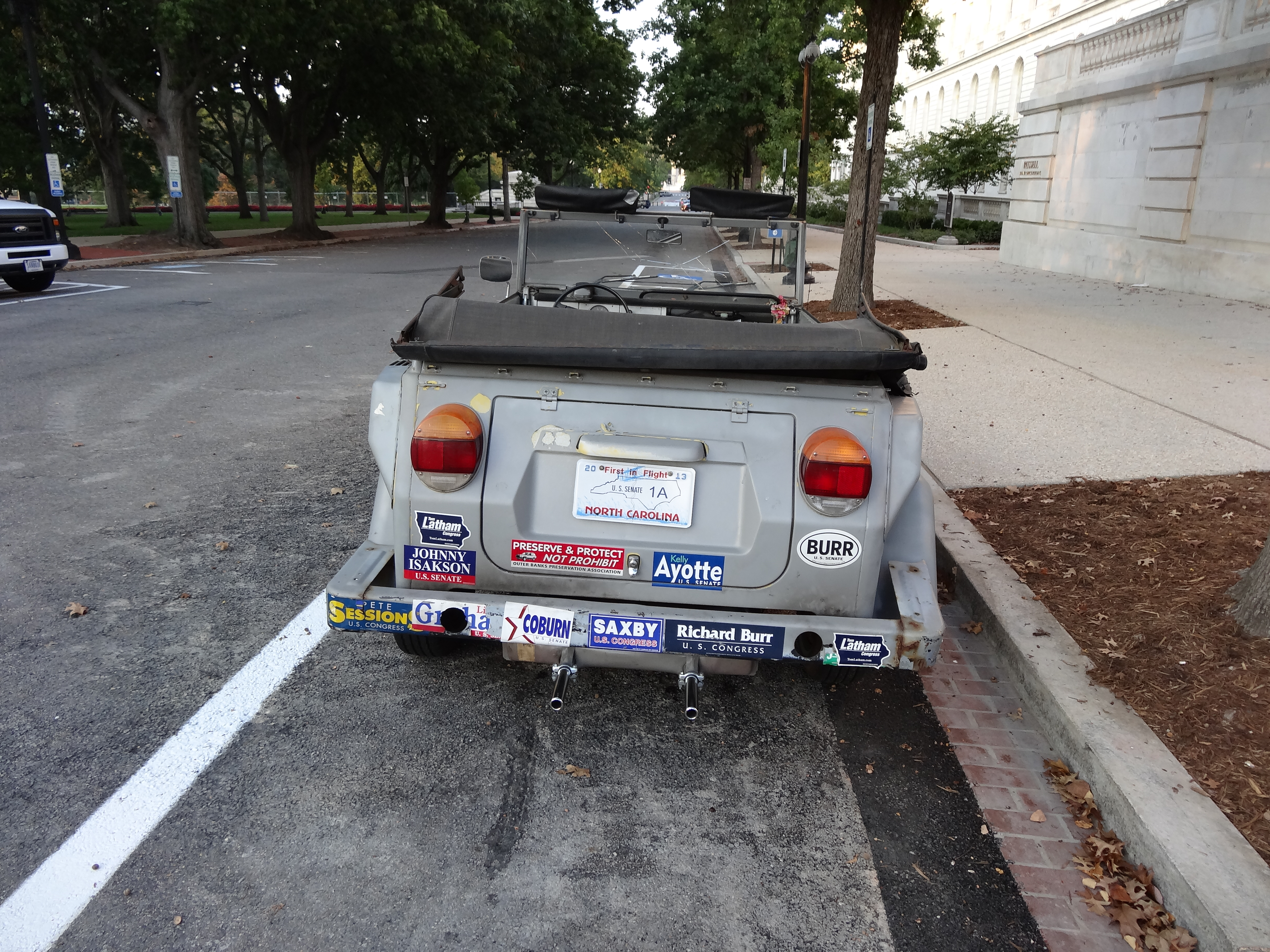
Rear, showing campaign bumper stickers of fellow Republicans

Burr's car, a 1973 Volkswagen Thing, is "something of a local celebrity" on Capitol Hill. Burr has a known aversion to reporters, once even climbing out of his office window while carrying his dry cleaning to avoid them. Burr is a member of the United Methodist Church.

Burr has been married to Brooke Fauth Burr, a real estate agent, since 1984, and they have two sons, Tyler and William. Both work for tobacco companies. He is a distant relative of 19th century vice-president Aaron Burr, as a descendant of one of Aaron Burr's brothers.

== Electoral history ==
North Carolina's 5th congressional district: Results 1992–2002
Year	Democratic	Votes	Pct	Republican	Votes	Pct	3rd party	Party	Votes	Pct	3rd party	Party	Votes	Pct
1992	Stephen L. Neal	117,835	53%	Richard Burr	102,086	46%	Gary Albrecht	Libertarian	3,758	2%				
1994	A. P. "Sandy" Sands	63,194	43%	Richard Burr	84,741	57%								
1996	Neil Grist Cashion Jr.	74,320	35%	Richard Burr	130,177	62%	Barbara J. Howe	Libertarian	4,193	2%	Craig Berg	Natural Law	1,008	<1%
1998	Mike Robinson	55,806	32%	Richard Burr	119,103	68%	Gene Paczelt	Libertarian	1,382	1%				
2000	(no candidate)			Richard Burr	172,489	93%	Steven Francis LeBoeuf	Libertarian	13,366	7%				
2002	David Crawford	58,558	30%	Richard Burr	137,879	70%								

North Carolina Senator (Class III): Results 2004–2016
Year	Democratic	Votes	Pct	Republican	Votes	Pct	3rd party	Party	Votes	Pct
2004	Erskine Bowles	1,632,527	47%	Richard Burr	1,791,450	52%	Tom Bailey	Libertarian	47,743	1%
2010	Elaine Marshall	1,145,074	43%	Richard Burr	1,458,046	55%	Mike Beitler	Libertarian	55,682	2%
2016	Deborah Ross	2,128,165	45%	Richard Burr	2,395,376	51%	Sean Haugh	Libertarian	167,592	4%

2004 U.S. Senate Republican primary election in North Carolina
Party	Candidate	Votes	%	+%
Republican	Richard Burr	302,319	88%	
Republican	John Ross Hendrix	25,971	8%	
Republican	Albert Lee Wiley Jr.	15,585	5%	

2016 U.S. Senate Republican primary election in North Carolina
Party	Candidate	Votes	%	+%
Republican	Richard Burr (inc.)	627,263	61%	
Republican	Greg Brannon	257,296	25%	
Republican	Paul Wright	86,933	9%	
Republican	Larry Holmquist	50,500	5%	

U.S. House of Representatives
Preceded by Stephen L. Neal	Member of the U.S. House of Representatives from North Carolina's 5th congressional district 1995–2005	Succeeded by Virginia Foxx
Party political offices
Preceded by Lauch Faircloth	Republican nominee for U.S. Senator from North Carolina (Class 3); 2004, 2010, 2016	Succeeded by Ted Budd
Preceded by John Thune	Senate Republican Chief Deputy Whip; 2009–2013	Succeeded by Mike Crapo
U.S. Senate
Preceded by John Edwards	U.S. Senator (Class 3) from North Carolina; 2005–2023; Served alongside: Elizabeth Dole, Kay Hagan, Thom Tillis	Succeeded by Ted Budd
Preceded by Larry Craig	Ranking Member of the Senate Veterans' Affairs Committee; 2007–2015	Succeeded by Richard Blumenthal
Preceded by Dianne Feinstein	Chair of the Senate Intelligence Committee; 2015–2020	Succeeded by Marco Rubio; Acting
Preceded by Patty Murray	Ranking Member of the Senate Health Committee; 2021–2023	Succeeded by Bill Cassidy
U.S. order of precedence (ceremonial)
Preceded by Al D'Amato as Former U.S. Senator	Order of precedence of the United States as Former U.S. Senator	Succeeded by Sherrod Brown as Former U.S. Senator
