= 2004 United States Senate election in North Carolina =

- November 2, 2004
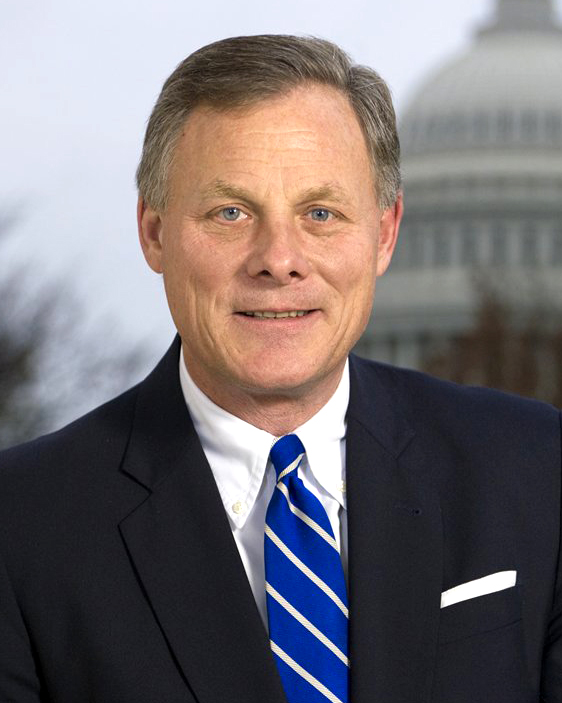

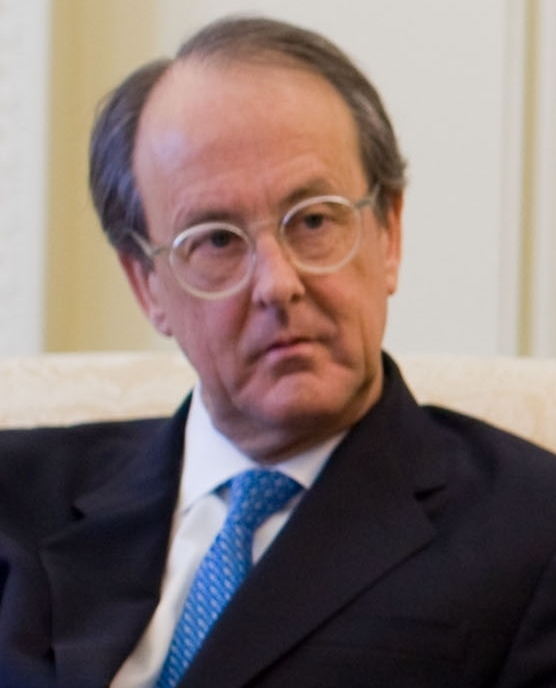
Nominee	Richard Burr	Erskine Bowles
Party	Republican	Democratic
Popular vote	1,791,450	1,632,527
Percentage	51.60%	47.02%
- Burr: 40–50% 50–60% 60–70% 70–80% 80–90% >90% Bowles: 40–50% 50–60% 60–70% 70–80% 80–90% >90% Tie: 40–50%
U.S. senator before election
John Edwards
Democratic
Elected U.S. Senator
Richard Burr
Republican

The 2004 United States Senate election in North Carolina was held on November 2, 2004. Incumbent Democratic U.S. Senator John Edwards decided to retire from the Senate after one term to run for the 2004 Democratic Party presidential nomination, and become his party's vice presidential nominee. Republican Richard Burr won the open seat, making it the fifth consecutive election in which partisan control of the seat changed.

== Primaries ==
=== Democratic ===
Erskine Bowles won the Democratic Party's nomination unopposed. He had been the party's nominee for the state's other Senate seat in 2002.

=== Republican ===
Republican primary results
Party	Candidate	Votes	%
Republican	Richard Burr	302,319	87.92%
Republican	John Ross Hendrix	25,971	7.55%
Republican	Albert Wiley	15,585	4.53%
Total votes		343,875	100.00%

== General election ==
=== Candidates ===
- Tom Bailey (L), Vietnam War veteran
- Erskine Bowles (D), businessman and President Bill Clinton's chief of staff
- Richard Burr (R), U.S. representative from North Carolina's 5th congressional district since 1995

=== Campaign ===
Both major-party candidates engaged in negative campaign tactics, with Bowles' campaign attacking Burr for special interest donations and his positions on trade legislation, and Burr's campaign attacking Bowles for his connections to the Clinton administration. Both attacks had basis in reality: Burr's campaign raised funds from numerous political action committees and at least 72 of the 100 largest Fortune 500 companies, while Bowles departed from the Clinton administration in the midst of the Monica Lewinsky scandal.

Burr won the election by 4%. He joined the Senate in January 2005. Bowles went on to become the president of the UNC system.

=== Predictions ===
Source	Ranking	As of
Sabato's Crystal Ball	Lean R (flip)	November 1, 2004

=== Polling ===
Poll source	Date(s) administered	Sample size (Note: Key: A – all adults RV – registered voters LV – likely voters V – unclear)	Margin of error	Richard Burr (R)	Erskine Bowles (D)	Other / Undecided
SurveyUSA	October 29–31, 2004	616 (LV)	± 4.0%	50%	45%	5%

=== Results ===
2004 United States Senate election in North Carolina
Party	Candidate	Votes	%	±%
Republican	Richard Burr	1,791,450	51.60%	+4.58%
Democratic	Erskine Bowles	1,632,527	47.02%	–4.13%
Libertarian	Tom Bailey	47,743	1.38%	–0.46%
Nonpartisan	Walker F. Rucker (write-in)	362	0.01%	N/A
Total votes		3,471,720	100.00%	N/A
Republican gain from Democratic				

==== Counties that flipped from Democratic to Republican ====
- Duplin (largest city: Wallace)
- Franklin (largest city: Wake Forest)
- Haywood (largest city: Waynesville)
- Jones (largest city: Maysville)
- Madison (largest city: Mars Hill)
- Montgomery (largest city: Troy)
- Nash (largest municipality: Rocky Mount)
- New Hanover (largest municipality: Wilmington)
- Brunswick (largest municipality: Leland)
- Greene (largest municipality: Snow Hill)
- Person (largest municipality: Roxboro)
- Pender (largest municipality: Hampstead)
- Swain (largest municipality: Cherokee)
- Washington (largest municipality: Plymouth)
- Perquimans (largest city: Hertford)
- Camden (largest city: Camden)
- Dare (largest city: Kill Devil Hills)
- Forsyth (largest town: Winston-Salem)
- Pitt (largest town: Greenville)
- Lenoir (largest town: Kinston)
- Alleghany (largest town: Sparta)
- Beaufort (largest town: Washington)
- Burke (largest town: Morgantown)
- Cleveland (largest town: Shelby)
- Craven (largest town: New Bern)
- Pamlico (largest town: Bayboro)

== See also ==
- 2004 United States Senate elections
