= Senator Dole =

Senator Dole may refer to:

- Bob Dole (1923–2021), U.S. Senator from Kansas from 1969 to 1996 and husband of Elizabeth Dole.
- Elizabeth Dole (born 1936), U.S. Senator from North Carolina from 2003 to 2009 and wife of Bob Dole.

== See also ==
- John J. Doles (1895–1970), Louisiana State Senate
