= 2002 United States Senate election in North Carolina =

- November 5, 2002
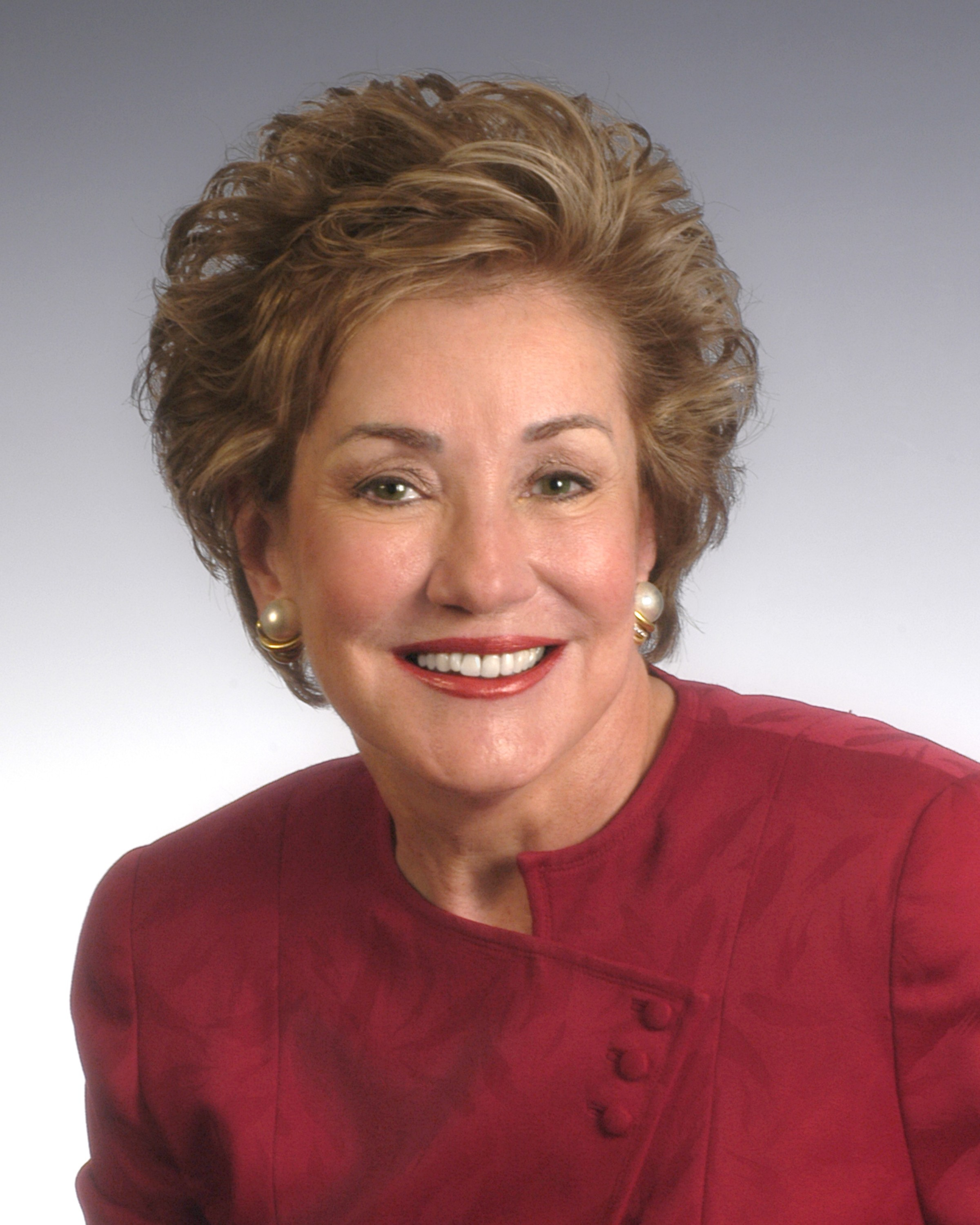

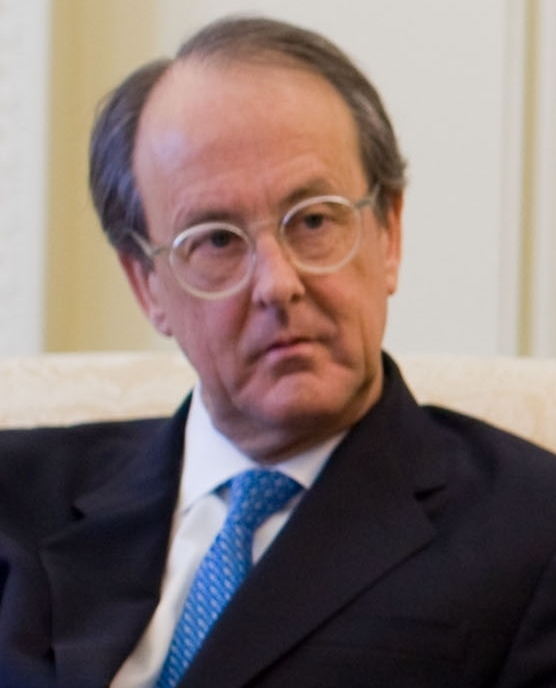
Nominee	Elizabeth Dole	Erskine Bowles
Party	Republican	Democratic
Popular vote	1,248,664	1,047,983
Percentage	53.56%	44.96%
- Dole: 40–50% 50–60% 60–70% 70–80% 80–90% Bowles: 40–50% 50–60% 60–70% 70–80% 80–90% >90% Tie: 40–50% 50%
U.S. senator before election
Jesse Helms
Republican
Elected U.S. Senator
Elizabeth Dole
Republican

The 2002 United States Senate election in North Carolina was held on November 5, 2002. Incumbent Republican U.S. Senator Jesse Helms announced in August 2001 that he would retire due to health issues. Republican Elizabeth Dole won the open seat, becoming the first non-incumbent to capture a Senate seat for the Republican party in the state's history. This was the first open seat election since 1974 and the first time it occurred at this seat.

== Democratic primary ==
During the primary campaign, Bowles was considered the choice of the party establishment, receiving support from former Governor Jim Hunt and the AFL-CIO.

=== Candidates ===
- Dan Blue, state representative
- Erskine Bowles, former White House chief of staff
- Cynthia D. Brown, Durham city councilwoman
- Elaine Marshall, secretary of state of North Carolina

=== Results ===
Democratic primary results
Party	Candidate	Votes	%
Democratic	Erskine Bowles	277,329	43.4%
Democratic	Dan Blue	184,216	28.8%
Democratic	Elaine Marshall	97,392	15.2%
Democratic	Cynthia D. Brown	27,799	4.4%
Democratic	Others	52,289	8.2%
Total votes		639,025	100.0%

== Republican primary ==
Dole was described as the "handpicked" choice of the White House, and received the support of President George W. Bush, Vice President Dick Cheney, and outgoing Senator Jesse Helms.

=== Candidates ===
- Elizabeth Dole, former United States Secretary of Labor, former United States secretary of transportation, former assistant to the president for public liaison, and wife of former U.S. Senator Bob Dole
- Ada Fisher, physician and activist
- Jim Parker, physician
- James Snyder Jr., former state representative

=== Results ===
Republican primary results
Party	Candidate	Votes	%
Republican	Elizabeth Dole	342,631	80.4%
Republican	James Snyder Jr.	60,477	14.2%
Republican	Jim Parker	8,752	2.1%
Republican	Ada Fisher	6,045	1.4%
Republican	Others	8,201	1.9%
Total votes		426,106	100.0%

== General election ==
=== Candidates ===
- Erskine Bowles (D), former White House chief of staff
- Elizabeth Dole (R), former United States secretary of labor, United States secretary of transportation, assistant to the president for public liaison, and wife of U.S. Senator Bob Dole
- Sean Haugh (L)

=== Debates ===
2002 United States Senate election in North Carolina debates
No.	Date	Host	Moderator	Link	Republican	Democratic
Key: P Participant A Absent N Not invited I Invited W Withdrawn						
Key: P Participant A Absent N Not invited I Invited W Withdrawn					Elizabeth Dole	Erskine Bowles
1	Oct. 14, 2002	Meredith College; WRAL-TV; WTVD-TV	David Crabtree; Larry Stogner	C-SPAN	P	P
2	Oct. 19, 2002	East Carolina University; WCTI-TV; WNCT-TV	Wes Goforth; Alan Hoffman	C-SPAN	P	P

=== Predictions ===
Source	Ranking	As of
Sabato's Crystal Ball	Lean R	November 4, 2002

=== Polling ===
Poll source	Date(s) administered	Sample size (Note: Key: A – all adults RV – registered voters LV – likely voters V – unclear)	Margin of error	Elizabeth Dole (R)	Erskine Bowles (D)	Other / Undecided
SurveyUSA	October 28–30, 2002	611 (LV)	± 4.0%	50%	46%	4%

=== Results ===
2002 United States Senate election in North Carolina
Party	Candidate	Votes	%	±%
Republican	Elizabeth Dole	1,248,664	53.56%	+0.92%
Democratic	Erskine Bowles	1,047,983	44.96%	−0.96%
Libertarian	Sean Haugh	33,807	1.45%	+0.46%
Write-in		727	0.03%	+0.02%
Total votes		2,331,181	100.00%	N/A
Republican hold				

==== Counties that flipped from Democratic to Republican ====
- Wake (largest town: Raleigh)
- Guilford (largest city: Greensboro)
- Mecklenburg (largest city: Charlotte)
- Buncombe (largest town: Asheville)
- Watauga (largest municipality: Boone)

==== Counties that flipped from Republican to Democratic ====
- Perquimans (largest city: Hertford)
- Granville (largest city: Oxford)
- Duplin (largest city: Wallace)
- Jones (largest city: Maysville)
- Madison (largest city: Mars Hill)
- Haywood (largest city: Waynesville)
- Yancey (largest municipality: Burnsville)
- Camden (largest municipality: Elizabeth City)
- Martin (largest town: Williamston)
  County results by flips

== See also ==
- 2002 United States Senate elections
