= Molly Corbett Broad =

American academic administrator (1941–2023)

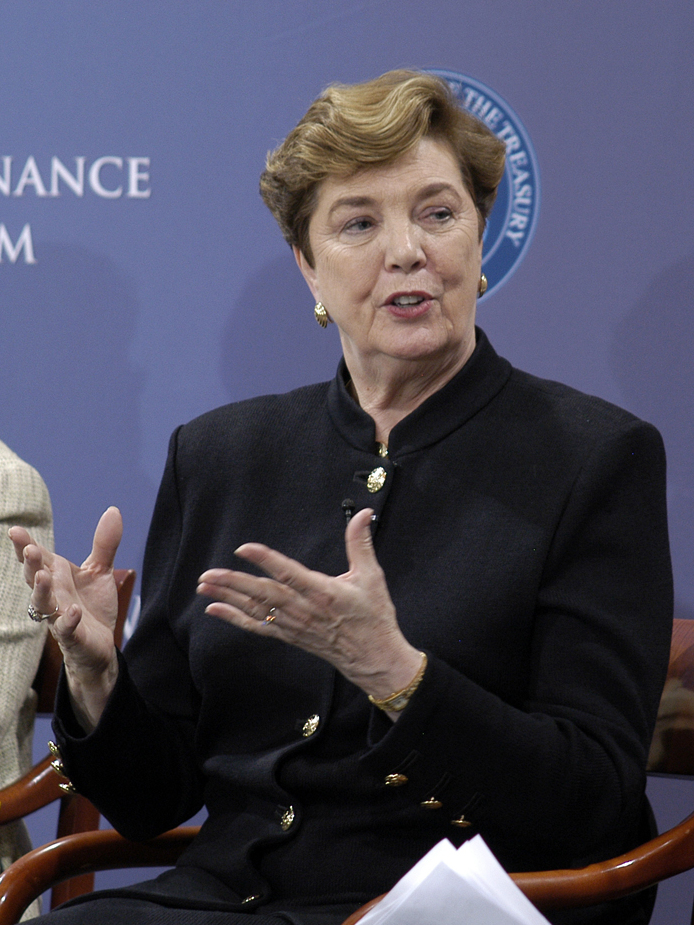

President of the American Council on Education
- In office 2008–2017
- Preceded by: David Ward
- Succeeded by: Ted Mitchell

President of the University of North Carolina System
- In office 1997–2006
- Preceded by: Clemmie Spangler
- Succeeded by: Erskine Bowles

Personal details
- Born: February 22, 1941 Wilkes-Barre, Pennsylvania, U.S.
- Died: January 2, 2023 (aged 81)
- Spouse: Robert W. Broad (m. 1962; died 2020)
- Children: 2
- Education: Syracuse University; Ohio State University
- Occupation: Educator

Molly Corbett Broad (February 22, 1941 – January 2, 2023) was an American academic administrator who was president of the American Council on Education and the University of North Carolina.

== Early life and education ==
Molly Corbett was born in Wilkes-Barre, Pennsylvania, on February 22, 1941, one of four children of Stanley A. Corbett and Margaret (née Kelly) Corbett, both public school teachers. She earned a General Motors Scholarship to Syracuse University, where she was a member of Kappa Alpha Theta and graduated Phi Beta Kappa in 1962 with a baccalaureate degree in economics from the Maxwell School of Citizenship and Public Affairs. She kept close relations with Syracuse where she was a longtime member of the Maxwell School Advisory Board. She was awarded the George Arents Pioneer Medal (1999), Syracuse's highest alumni honor, honorary doctor of laws degree (2009), and the Melvin A. Eggers Senior Alumni Award (2015). She received a master's degree in economics from Ohio State University.

== Career in university administration ==
Broad started her career at Syracuse University; from 1971–85, she served as Manager of the Office of Budget and Planning, Director of Institutional Research, and Vice President for Government and Corporate Relations. In 1976, she served the Director of the New York State Commission on the Future of Postsecondary Education.

From 1985 to 1992, Broad served as the Chief Executive Officer for the Arizona University System. She then moved to the California State University System, serving as Senior Vice Chancellor for Administration and Finance from 1992–93, and Executive Vice Chancellor and Chief Operating Officer from 1993-97.

Broad served as the third President of the University of North Carolina system from 1997 to 2006. During her time in this role, she oversaw a historic $3.1 billion higher education bond and created the state's first need-based scholarship program. She also focused on doubling overall minority enrollment and worked to make higher education more accessible through technology. She pushed for greater independence for individual campuses within the UNC System. She also challenged the state's tradition of low tuition costs by raising tuition but increasing financial aid. In addition, she continuously sought out projects that could generate more funding for the UNC System and boost the state's economy.

She was named the twelfth President of the American Council on Education on January 15, 2008. Broad, who succeeded David Ward on May 1, 2008, became the first woman to lead the organization since it was founded, in 1918. She left the job in on October 31, 2017.

Broad had been working as a partner at RIDGE-LANE LP's Education Practice since 2018. She also held a position on the TIAA-CREF Board of Overseers, and previously served on the PBS Board of Directors, and as the chair of the National Association of State Universities and Land-Grant Colleges, a research, policy, and advocacy organization.

== Personal life and death ==
Broad met her future husband, Robert W. Broad, at Syracuse University and they married in 1962. He died in 2020. The couple had two adult sons.

Broad died on January 2, 2023, at the age of 81.
