= Mary Gardiner Jones =

American lawyer and politician

Commissioner of the Federal Trade Commission
- In office October 29, 1964 – November 2, 1973
- President: Lyndon B. Johnson

Personal details
- Born: December 10, 1920 New York, New York, US
- Died: December 23, 2009 (aged 89) Washington, D.C., U.S.
- Party: Republican
- Education: Wellesley College; Yale Law School
- Occupation: Antitrust Lawyer
- Known for: First woman to serve on the FTC

Mary Gardiner Jones (December 10, 1920 – December 23, 2009) was the first woman to serve as a member of the Federal Trade Commission of the United States, to which she was appointed by President Lyndon B. Johnson in 1964.

== Biography ==
Born in Manhattan to a distinguished Long Island family. Jones graduated from the Nightengale-Bamford School in 1939 and received a B.A. in history from Wellesley College in 1943. She worked for the Office of Strategic Services during World War II, where she was a research analyst in charge of the Swiss desk. She received a law degree from Yale Law School in 1948.

Jones became a lawyer for the Antitrust Division of the United States Department of Justice in 1953. In that role, she presided over antirust and cartel cases, serving as chief counsel for United States v. Watchmakers of Switzerland Information Center, Inc.(1955). She left government service to practice law in private practice in New York.

On September 28, 1964, Jones was named by President Lyndon B. Johnson to serve on the Federal Trade Commission (FTC), initially through a recess appointment and subsequently through a Senate confirmation. Jones served on the commission until 1973 during both Republican and Democratic administrations. She was replaced on the FTC 1973 by Elizabeth Hanford (later Elizabeth Dole).

In 1971, she was named as a potential nominee to the Supreme Court of the United States. In 1981, she served on the Department of the Interior Commission on Fiscal Accountability of the National's Energy Resources, which presented a report to the White House on ways that national oil and gas royalties can be better tracked on public lands.

Jones was a vocal consumer advocate. A liberal Republican during her time on the FTC, Jones became a member of the Democratic Party later in life. In 2007, Jones released an autobiography, titled Tearing Down Walls: a Woman's Triumph. In the book, she discusses the difficulty of breaking into the legal professional in the 1940s, during a time when few female graduates were offered roles as practicing attorneys.

Jones died from congestive heart failure at her home in Washington, D.C., on December 23, 2009, at the age of 89.
