= Thomas Bowles =

Thomas or Tom Bowles may refer to:

- Thomas Bowles (priest) (1696–1773), Church of England priest
- Thomas Gibson Bowles (1842–1922), founder of the magazines The Lady and the English Vanity Fair
- Thomas J. Bowles (American politician) (1822–?), member of the Wisconsin State Assembly
- Thomas J. Bowles (physicist), known as Tom, American nuclear physicist
- Tom Parker Bowles (born 1974), British food writer and food critic

== See also ==
- Tommy Bowles (disambiguation)
