= Sean Haugh =

American politician (born 1960)

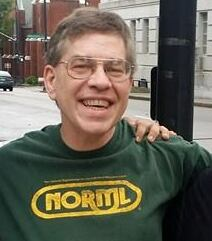
- Haugh at a NORML event in Raleigh, North Carolina
- Born: November 17, 1960 (age 65); Tucson, Arizona, U.S.
- Education: Tufts University
- Known for: Libertarian Party candidate for United States Senate in 2002, 2014, and 2016
- Political party: Libertarian

Sean Newton Haugh (born November 17, 1960) is an American politician and pizza delivery man who has run for Senate in North Carolina under the Libertarian Party nomination in 2002, 2014 and 2016. He currently resides in Durham, North Carolina.

== Campaigns ==
=== 2002 ===
During his 2002 campaign Haugh also acted as Executive Director of the Libertarian Party of North Carolina. Haugh helped raise money for Libertarian candidates by helping sell calendars featuring pinups of female Libertarians which were made by fellow Libertarian Rachel Mills, an idea thought up during an informal conversation between Haugh and Mills about fundraising. The calendars were sold for $20 each with Haugh describing all the photographs as "tasteful" and saying the calendar received mostly positive reactions.

=== 2014 ===
Although Haugh had sworn off of politics years earlier he decided to run in 2014 because he couldn't stand the idea of only having a Democrat and a Republican on the ballot. Haugh became well known for his campaign video where he shares his political platform. These videos are filmed from his campaign manager's basement.

During Haugh's 2014 campaign the conservative group American Future Fund funded an online campaign for Haugh. The ads for the campaign used slogans like "Get Haugh, Get High" and "More Weed, Less War". Though the ads directly supported Haugh the candidate himself has stated

While I appreciate the support, I have a whole new reason to despise Koch brothers and their dark money,

Haugh told the Charlotte Observer that "Apparently all three campaigns are now busy telling everyone that I am the best candidate in this race."

=== 2016 ===
Haugh was not invited to the debate between Deborah Ross and Richard Burr for the 2016 election. He tweeted that instead he would be delivering pizzas during the debate.

== Elections ==
2002 North Carolina U.S. Senate Election
Party	Candidate	Votes	%	±%
Republican	Elizabeth Dole	1,248,664	53.6	▲0.9
Democratic	Erskine Bowles	1,047,983	45.0	▼1.0
Libertarian	Sean Haugh	33,807	1.5	▲0.5
Write-In		727	nil	nil
Majority		200,681	8.6	▲1.9
Turnout		2,331,181		

2014 North Carolina U.S. Senate election
Party	Candidate	Votes	%	±%
Republican	Thom Tillis	1,423,259	48.8%	▲4.6
Democratic	Kay Hagan	1,377,651	47.3%	▼5.4
Libertarian	Sean Haugh	109,100	3.7%	▲0.6
Other	Write-ins	5,271	0.2%	▲0.1
Plurality		45,608	1.6%	
Turnout		2,915,281		

United States Senate election in North Carolina, 2016
Party	Candidate	Votes	%	±%
Republican	Richard Burr (i)	2,395,376	51.1	−3.8
Democratic	Deborah Ross	2,128,165	45.4	+2.3
Libertarian	Sean Haugh	167,592	3.6	+1.5
Majority		267,208	5.7	+6.1
Total votes		4,691,133	100	+76.4
Republican hold		Swing		

== Personal life ==
Haugh has lived in Durham, North Carolina since 1988. He is married to Pam Adams and owns two dogs and two cats. His hobbies include cooking, reading, listening to music, and football. He is not affiliated with any religion. In August 2016 Haugh had a heart-attack and was admitted to Duke University Hospital.
