= Charles Bowles =

Charles Bowles may refer to:

- Charles Bowles (mayor) (1884–1957), politician from Michigan, mayor of Detroit in 1930
- Charles Bowles (minister) (1761–1843), American itinerant preacher
- Charles J. Bowles (1922–2005), American professor of physical education and human anatomy
- Charles W. Bowles (1877–1966), British civil engineer
- Charlie Bowles (1917–2003), American baseball pitcher
