= Jack Bowles =

English cricketer (1890–1971)

Cricket information
- Batting: Right-handed
- Bowling: Left-arm medium; Slow-left arm orthodox

Career statistics
Competition	First-class
Matches	80
Runs scored	1,392
Batting average	11.50
100s/50s	0/2
Top score	73
Balls bowled	5,920
Wickets	83
Bowling average	41.65
5 wickets in innings	1
10 wickets in match	0
Best bowling	5/56
Catches/stumpings	48/1
- Source: CricketArchive, 7 November 2022

John Jesse Bowles (3 April 1890 – 27 November 1971) was an English cricketer who played 80 first-class games in two spells: he was with Gloucestershire from 1911 to 1920, though he played only 18 times for the county in those years. He made the bulk of his appearances, 62, for Worcestershire between 1926 and 1928.

Born in Lower Slaughter, Gloucestershire, Bowles made his first-class debut for that county in late July 1911 against Nottinghamshire, and took two wickets, his first being that of Notts' opener George Gunn. He played another two matches in 1911, but had little success, taking only one more wicket. For the next three seasons he played only occasionally, and the same was the case when cricket resumed after the First World War in 1919; never did he play more than four games in a summer, and never did he take more than six wickets. His best bowling for Gloucestershire was the 3-47 he took against Lancashire in 1919.

Bowles spent five seasons out of first-class cricket after leaving Gloucestershire at the end of 1920, having played only one match for them that season, although he did appear in the Lancashire League as Enfield's professional.

In 1926, however, he returned to the higher level when he was chosen by Worcestershire, and at once he enjoyed the best season of his career, taking 47 wickets in his 27 games at 30.14 including his only five-wicket innings haul, 5–56 against Sussex at Hove. His batting was also much improved, and he made two half-centuries, the higher of which - 73 against his old county of Gloucestershire - was to remain his career best. He also kept wicket occasionally, picking up his only stumping when he dismissed Glamorgan's Dai Davies while substituting for named keeper Maurice Foster.

In 1927, Bowles played only 11 games, and his batting fell away markedly: from 507 runs (his best) at 15.36 the previous year, his total was reduced to 175 runs at 10.29, with only three scores above 20. In 1928 he was once more a regular in the side, playing 24 games and sending down more than 300 overs, but was a major disappointment with the ball: his form in other departments of the game returned to some extent and he scored 473 runs and claimed 17 catches, but his bowling average ballooned to more than 80 as he took only 14 wickets all season. Indeed, after he had taken 3–85 against Northamptonshire, his last four first-class matches produced not a single wicket; in the last, against Hampshire, he did not even bowl.

After retirement, Bowles became an umpire. He had already stood in one first-class game, when he umpired a game between Glamorgan and HDG Leveson-Gower's XI in 1926, but his umpiring career proper spanned a single year, 1931, and lasted for 24 more matches. Most of his duties were on County Championship games, but they also included two tour matches by the New Zealanders and an end-of-season friendly game between Glamorgan and Nottinghamshire which was also Bowles' final match as an umpire.

Bowles died at the age of 81 in Salisbury, Wiltshire.
