= Rowan Bowles =

Australian handcyclist

Rowan Peter Bowles, is a former international endurance athlete in the sport of Handbike racing. In 2001 Rowan was involved in a motorcycle accident which resulted in C5/6 Quadriplegia. Rowan competed between 2003 – 2010 and won five Australian Championship gold, four silver and three bronze medals and the Tour of Perth. European Handbike Circuit race success in Switzerland, France, Italy, Germany, Austria and Czech Republic.
