= Tommy Bowles =

Tommy Bowles may refer to:

- Thomas Gibson Bowles (1841–1922), founder of the magazines The Lady and the English Vanity Fair
- Verdell Smith (born 1963), American boxer
