= Elizabeth Dole =

American politician and writer (born 1936)

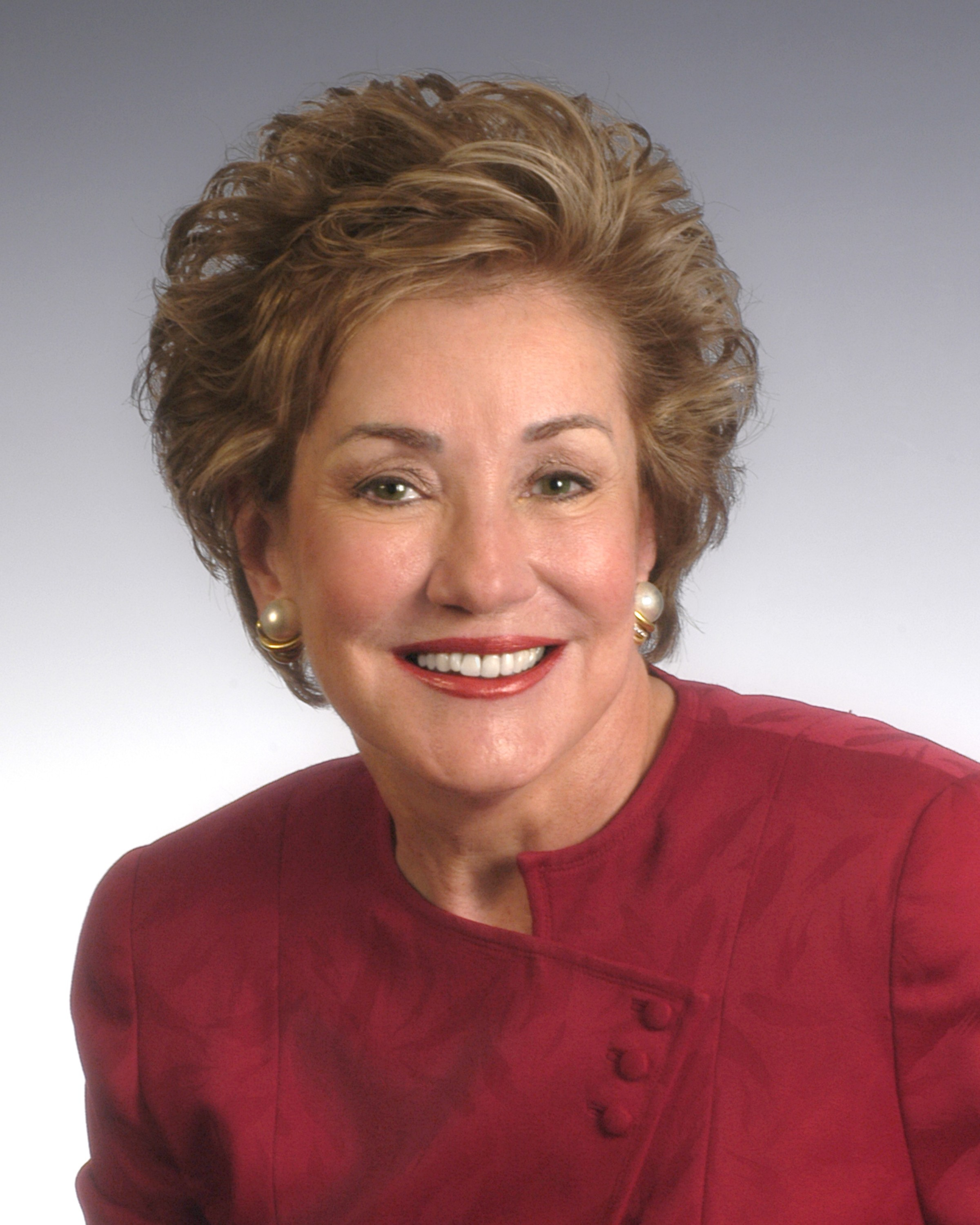
- Official portrait, 2003

Chair of the National Republican Senatorial Committee
- In office January 3, 2005 – January 3, 2007
- Leader: Bill Frist
- Preceded by: George Allen
- Succeeded by: John Ensign

United States Senator from North Carolina
- In office January 3, 2003 – January 3, 2009
- Preceded by: Jesse Helms
- Succeeded by: Kay Hagan

20th United States Secretary of Labor
- In office January 25, 1989 – November 23, 1990
- President: George H. W. Bush
- Deputy: Roderick Allen DeArment
- Preceded by: Ann McLaughlin
- Succeeded by: Lynn M. Martin

8th United States Secretary of Transportation
- In office February 7, 1983 – September 30, 1987
- President: Ronald Reagan
- Preceded by: Drew Lewis
- Succeeded by: James H. Burnley IV

5th Director of the Office of Public Liaison
- In office January 20, 1981 – February 7, 1983
- President: Ronald Reagan
- Preceded by: Anne Wexler
- Succeeded by: Faith Whittlesey

Commissioner of the Federal Trade Commission
- In office December 4, 1973 – March 9, 1979
- Appointed by: Richard Nixon
- Preceded by: Mary Gardiner Jones
- Succeeded by: Patricia Bailey

Personal details
- Born: Mary Elizabeth Alexander Hanford; July 29, 1936 (age 90) Salisbury, North Carolina, U.S.
- Party: Democratic (before 1975); Republican (1975–present)
- Spouse: Bob Dole (m. 1975; died 2021)
- Education: Duke University (BA); Harvard University (MEd, JD)
- Awards: Presidential Medal of Freedom (2024)
- Dole's voice Dole opening a Senate Aging Committee hearing on Medicare drug benefit implementation. Recorded February 2, 2006

Mary Elizabeth Alexander Dole (née Hanford; born July 29, 1936) is an American attorney, author, and politician who served as a United States senator from North Carolina from 2003 to 2009. A member of the Republican Party, she previously served in five presidential administrations, including as U.S. Secretary of Transportation under Ronald Reagan from 1983 to 1987 and as U.S. Secretary of Labor under Reagan's successor, George H. W. Bush, from 1989 until 1990. Dole then left government to serve as president of the American Red Cross from 1991 to 1999; she departed from that position to seek the Republican nomination in the 2000 presidential election, but eventually withdrew from the race.

Dole graduated from Duke University in 1958 and earned a Juris Doctor degree from Harvard Law School in 1965. Throughout her public career, she was the first woman to hold a number of positions, including secretary of transportation, becoming the first woman to serve in two different presidential cabinet positions for two presidents after being appointed secretary of labor, as well as the first female U.S. senator from North Carolina and chair of the National Republican Senatorial Committee. She was also the third female secretary of labor and just the second woman to lead the American Red Cross since its founder, Clara Barton. She is the widow of U.S. senator Bob Dole from Kansas, who served as the Republican Senate leader and was the party's presidential nominee in the 1996 election and vice presidential nominee in the 1976 election.

== Early life and education ==
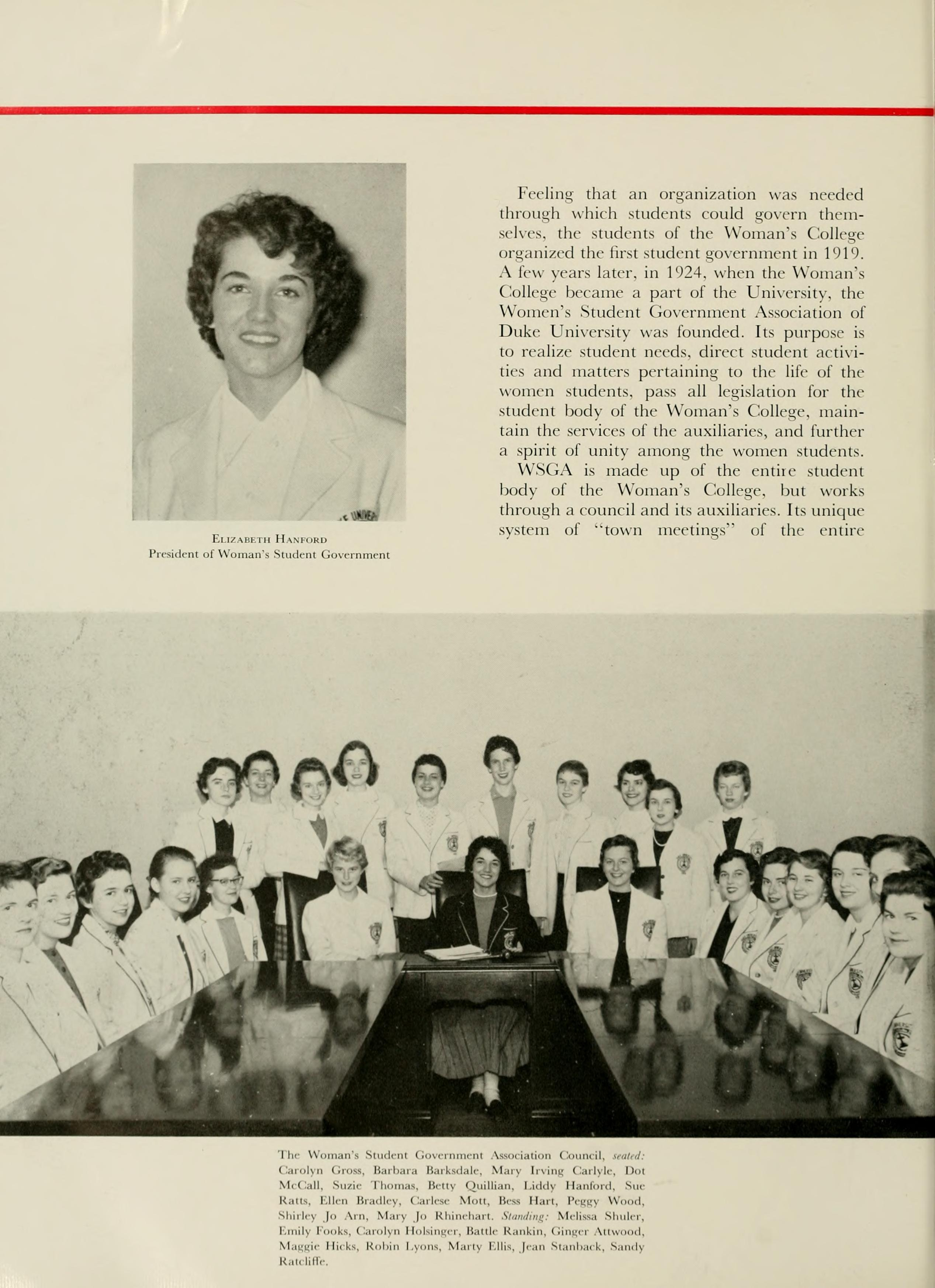
Dole in the Duke University yearbook, 1958

Dole was born Mary Elizabeth Alexander Hanford in Salisbury, North Carolina, on July 29, 1936, to Mary Ella (née Cathey; 1901–2004) and John Van Hanford (1893–1978).

Dole attended Duke University and graduated with distinction in political science on June 2, 1958. She was a finalist for an Angier B. Duke scholarship, a full-tuition award given to outstanding applicants who matriculate at Duke. She was elected to Phi Beta Kappa and was a recipient of the Algernon Sydney Sullivan Award, a national prize given to those exemplifying the ideal of service to others.

Among her activities at Duke were the chapel choir, Chanticleer (yearbook) business staff, freshman advisory council, the Order of the White Duchy (a local honorary society for outstanding women student leaders, a female counterpart of the Order of the Red Friars), Phi Kappa Delta (a local leadership honorary for senior women), and Pi Sigma Alpha (a national political-science honorary society). Dole is a sister of Delta Delta Delta. She was also elected president of the woman's student government association, 1958 May queen, and "leader of the year" by the student newspaper, The Chronicle. Dole has remained involved with Duke University, serving at various points in time as president of the Duke University alumnae association, and a member of the board of trustees and board of visitors. She has spoken formally at Duke several times.

Following her graduation from Duke, she did her post-graduate work at Oxford in 1959. After Oxford, she took a job as a student teacher at Melrose High School in Melrose, Massachusetts, for the 1959–1960 school year. While teaching, she also pursued her master's degree in education from Harvard University, which she earned in 1960, followed by a J.D. from Harvard Law School in 1965. At graduation, she was one of 24 women in a class of 550 students. She is an alumna of the Phi Beta Kappa honor society.

== White House years ==
=== Johnson administration ===
Dole, who had campaigned for the Kennedy–Johnson presidential ticket in 1960, began working in 1967 as a staff assistant to the Secretary of Health, Education, and Welfare in the Lyndon B. Johnson administration.

=== Nixon and Ford administrations ===
When many Democrats left the White House following Richard Nixon's replacement of Johnson, Dole did not. From 1969 to 1973, she served as deputy assistant to President Nixon for consumer affairs. In 1973, Nixon appointed her to a seven-year term on the Federal Trade Commission.

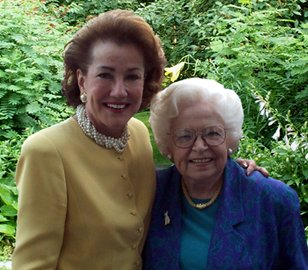
Elizabeth Dole with friend and mentor Virginia Knauer

Dole first met her future husband, Bob Dole, in the spring of 1972 at a meeting arranged by her boss and mentor, Virginia Knauer. The couple dated, and she became his second wife on December 6, 1975, in the Washington National Cathedral. They had no children, though she is stepmother to Bob's adult daughter Robin from his first marriage of 24 years, which ended in divorce in 1972. She attended individually, and later with her husband, the Foundry United Methodist Church in Washington, D.C., before joining the National Presbyterian Church in 1996. Articles at the time reported that the Doles stopped attending Foundry in 1995, finding the pastor at the time, J. Philip Wogaman, too liberal.

In 1975, she became a Republican. She took a leave from her post as a Federal Trade Commissioner for several months in 1976 to campaign for her husband for vice president of the United States, when he ran on the Republican ticket with Gerald Ford. She later resigned from the FTC in 1979, to campaign for her husband's 1980 presidential run. During the 1970s, Dole was a self-described member of the Women's Liberation Movement and helped reform laws to ensure equal credit for women. She was also a supporter of the Equal Rights Amendment to the United States Constitution.

=== Reagan administration and Secretary of Transportation ===
She served as director of the White House Office of Public Liaison, from 1981 to 1983 and as United States Secretary of Transportation from 1983 to 1987 under Ronald Reagan. She was also appointed by Reagan to chair task forces that sought to reform federal and state laws to ensure equal rights for women. She was the first woman appointed Secretary of Transportation. In this role, she was the first woman to have served as the head of a branch of the United States military, as the United States Coast Guard was under the Department of Transportation at the time. Dole's appointment was "particularly irritating" to conservative activists, since "though at least nominally opposed to abortion, [she was] viewed by the right as [an] aggressive feminist."

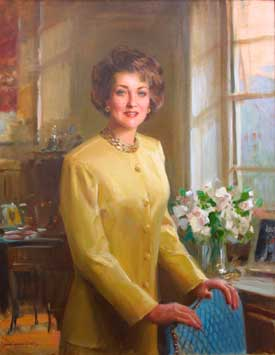
The official Department of Labor portrait of Elizabeth Dole

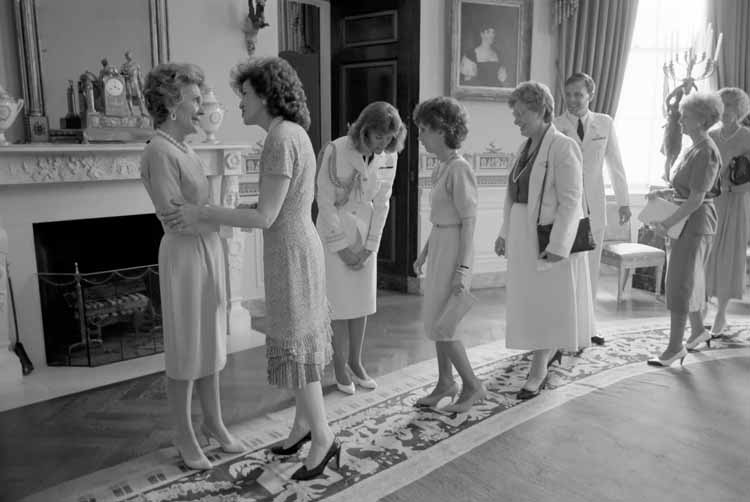
First Lady Nancy Reagan greets Dole and other Senate wives in the Blue Room. 1988

During her tenure, the National Highway Traffic Safety Administration mandated the installation of a center high-mounted stop lamp on new cars; these are sometimes called "Liddy Lights" in her recognition. She worked with MADD (Mothers Against Drunk Driving) to pass laws withholding federal highway funding from any state that had a drinking age below 21. The state government of South Dakota opposed the drinking age law and sued Dole in the case South Dakota v. Dole, but the Supreme Court ruled in favor of Dole. She oversaw the privatization of the national freight railroad, Conrail. She initiated random drug testing within the Department of Transportation. By 1984 Dole had stopped trying to get Reagan to support the Equal Rights Amendment. She was quoted in the press that year saying, "He's not going to change on that."

=== Bush administration and Secretary of Labor ===
Dole served as United States Secretary of Labor from 1989 to 1990 under George H. W. Bush; she is the first woman to serve in two different Cabinet positions in the administrations of two presidents. Her tenure as both U.S. Transportation Secretary and U.S. Labor Secretary focused heavily on improving public safety and workplace safety and health.

== American Red Cross presidency ==
In 1991, Dole became the president of the American Red Cross. She served until 1999. She was the second woman to serve as president since Clara Barton founded the organization in 1881. She restructured the world's largest humanitarian organization during her eight years as president, serving as a volunteer in her first year. She also led a transformation of the way the Red Cross collects, tests, and distributes one-half of the nation's blood supply.

== 1996 Republican National Convention ==
Dole's husband Bob Dole was the Republican nominee in the US presidential election of 1996. Elizabeth Dole, who would have become First Lady had her husband won the election, or the Second Lady of the United States, had Gerald Ford won the 1976 election, received recognition for her speech at the 1996 Republican National Convention, during which she walked out into the audience while talking conversationally about her husband's qualities.

== 2000 United States presidential candidacy ==
Elizabeth Dole for President
- Campaign: 2000 United States presidential election
- Candidate: Elizabeth Dole; 20th United States Secretary of Labor (1989–1990); 8th United States Secretary of Transportation (1983–1987); Director of the Office of Public Liaison (1981–1983); Commissioner of the Federal Trade Commission (1973–1979)
- Affiliation: Republican Party
- Status: Withdrawn
- Launched: March 10, 1999 (Exploratory committee)
- Suspended: October 1999

Website
- www.edole2000.org (archived – May 8, 1999)

Elizabeth Dole ran for the Republican nomination in the 2000 United States presidential election.

Speculation of a presidential campaign became widespread after Dole announced her departure from her job as president of the Red Cross on January 4, 1999.

Dole announced she was forming an exploratory committee on March 10, 1999.

While Dole had been an active participant in her husband's campaign four years prior, he was largely absent from the campaign trail during her campaign.

In August, Dole placed third – behind George W. Bush and Steve Forbes – in a large field in the Iowa Straw Poll (the first, non-binding, test of electability for the Republican Party nomination). The Iowa Straw Poll differed from the national polls where she was second only to Bush; Senator John McCain was in third place.

Dole withdrew from race in October 1999 before any of the primaries, largely due to inadequate fundraising even though a Gallup poll had her in second place in the presidential race at 11% behind George W. Bush at 60% as late as October 1999.

== 2000 vice presidential vetting ==
Shortly before the 2000 Republican National Convention in Philadelphia, Bush campaign sources said Elizabeth Dole was on the short list to be named the vice-presidential nominee, along with Michigan Governor John Engler, New York Governor George Pataki, Pennsylvania Governor Tom Ridge, and former Missouri Senator John Danforth. Many pundits believed that Dole was the frontrunner for the vice presidential nomination. Bush then surprised most pundits by selecting former U.S. Secretary of Defense Dick Cheney, who was actually in charge of leading Bush's search for a vice presidential nominee.

== U.S. Senate ==
=== 2002 Senate campaign ===
In late December 2001, Dole shifted her official residency from the Doles' condominium in the Watergate complex to her mother's home in Salisbury to seek election to the U.S. Senate. The seat was made available by the retirement of Republican Jesse Helms. Although Dole had not lived regularly in North Carolina since 1959 and had been a resident of the Washington area for most of the time since the mid-1960s, the state and national Republican establishment quickly cleared the field for her. She handily won the Republican primary with 80 percent of the vote over a lesser-known candidate, Ada Fisher. In the November general election, she defeated her Democratic opponent Erskine Bowles, a former chief of staff to former President Bill Clinton, by an eight-point margin.

Her election to the Senate marked the first time a spouse of a former Senator was elected to the Senate from a different state from that of her spouse. (Although Kansas Senator Nancy Landon Kassebaum married former Tennessee Senator Howard Baker, the marriage occurred after Kassebaum and Baker both had finished their service in the Senate.) Dole was criticized by Democrats (including then-North Carolina Senator John Edwards and her challenger, Erskine Bowles) during her first Senate campaign over the fact that for over 40 years prior to her nomination, she had not lived in North Carolina.

In November 2004, following Republican gains in the United States Senate, Dole narrowly edged out Senator Norm Coleman of Minnesota for the post of chairman of the National Republican Senatorial Committee. She is the first woman to become chair of the NRSC. During her election cycle as chairperson, her Democratic Party counterpart, Senator Chuck Schumer raised significantly more money, and experienced more success in recruiting candidates. In the November election, Dole's party lost six U.S. Senate seats to the Democrats, thus losing control of the U.S. Senate. Dole was replaced as NRSC chair by Senator John Ensign of Nevada following the 2006 midterms.

=== 2008 Senate re-election campaign ===
Dole was initially a heavy favorite for re-election, especially after several potential top-tier challengers such as Congressman Brad Miller, Governor Mike Easley and former Governor Jim Hunt all declined to compete against Dole. Ultimately, Kay Hagan, a state senator from Greensboro, won the Democratic primary election against Jim Neal and became Dole's general election opponent. Reports late in the campaign suggested that Dole suffered from Barack Obama's decision to aggressively contest North Carolina in the presidential election, while Hagan received substantial support from independent 527 groups lobbying/advertising against Dole, as well as the Democratic Senate Campaign Committee, which spent more money in North Carolina than in any other state during the 2008 election season. Dole undertook an eight-day "ElizaBus" tour of the state in the days leading up to election day.

In late October, Dole released a controversial television ad attacking Hagan for reportedly taking donations from individuals involved in the Godless Americans PAC, a group that advocates for the rights of people who do not believe in God. The ad also included a female voice saying, "There is no god." Hagan's campaign said the ad sought to put inflammatory words in their candidate's mouth. Hagan, who was a member of the Presbyterian Church and a former Sunday school teacher, condemned the ad as "fabricated and pathetic," and, according to Hagan's campaign website, a cease-and-desist letter was "hand-delivered to Dole's Raleigh office and to her home at the Watergate in Washington, DC." Hagan also filed a lawsuit in Wake County Superior Court accusing Dole of defamation and libel. The ad met significant criticism from some members of the public as well as national media outlets. After the first ad Hagan received over 3,600 contributions, including major donors as well as individual support from a range of persons who believed in the right to participate in civil government free of religious orthodoxy requirements. Following the second ad Hagan's lead doubled according to some polls.

In the 2008 election, Dole lost by a wider-than-expected margin, taking 44 percent of the vote to Hagan's 53 percent. It has been speculated that the outcry over the "Godless" ad contributed to Dole's loss. Hagan trounced Dole in the state's five largest counties – Mecklenburg, Wake, Guilford, Forsyth and Durham. Hagan also dominated most of the eastern portion of the state, which had been the backbone of Helms' past Senate victories. While Dole dominated the Charlotte suburbs and most of the heavily Republican Foothills region, it was not enough to save her seat.

=== Political positions ===
Dole's voting record was somewhat more conservative than that of her husband, though slightly less conservative than that of Helms. She has a lifetime rating of 92 from the American Conservative Union.

Dole worked with other senators such as Chuck Hagel to draft and attempt to pass legislation reforming housing financing regulation; the bill did not go up for a vote.

In September 2008, Dole joined the Gang of 20, a bipartisan group working towards comprehensive energy reform, which pushed for a bill that would encourage state-by-state decisions on offshore drilling and authorize billions of dollars for conservation and alternative energy.

As a member of the U.S. Senate Committee on Armed Services, Dole is credited with helping to prevent any closures of North Carolina military bases despite threats from the Department of Defense. In 2007, she sponsored legislation which would have granted federal recognition of a North Carolina Native American tribe, the Lumbee based in Robeson County.

=== Committee assignments ===
Dole was a member of the following U.S. Senate committees:

- U.S. Senate Committee on Armed Services
  - Emerging Threats and Capabilities
  - Personnel
  - Readiness and Management Support
- U.S. Senate Committee on Banking, Housing, and Urban Affairs
  - Financial Institutions
  - Housing, Transportation, and Community Development
  - Security and International Trade and Finance
- U.S. Senate Select Committee on Aging
- U.S. Senate Committee on Small Business and Entrepreneurship

== After politics: Elizabeth Dole Foundation ==
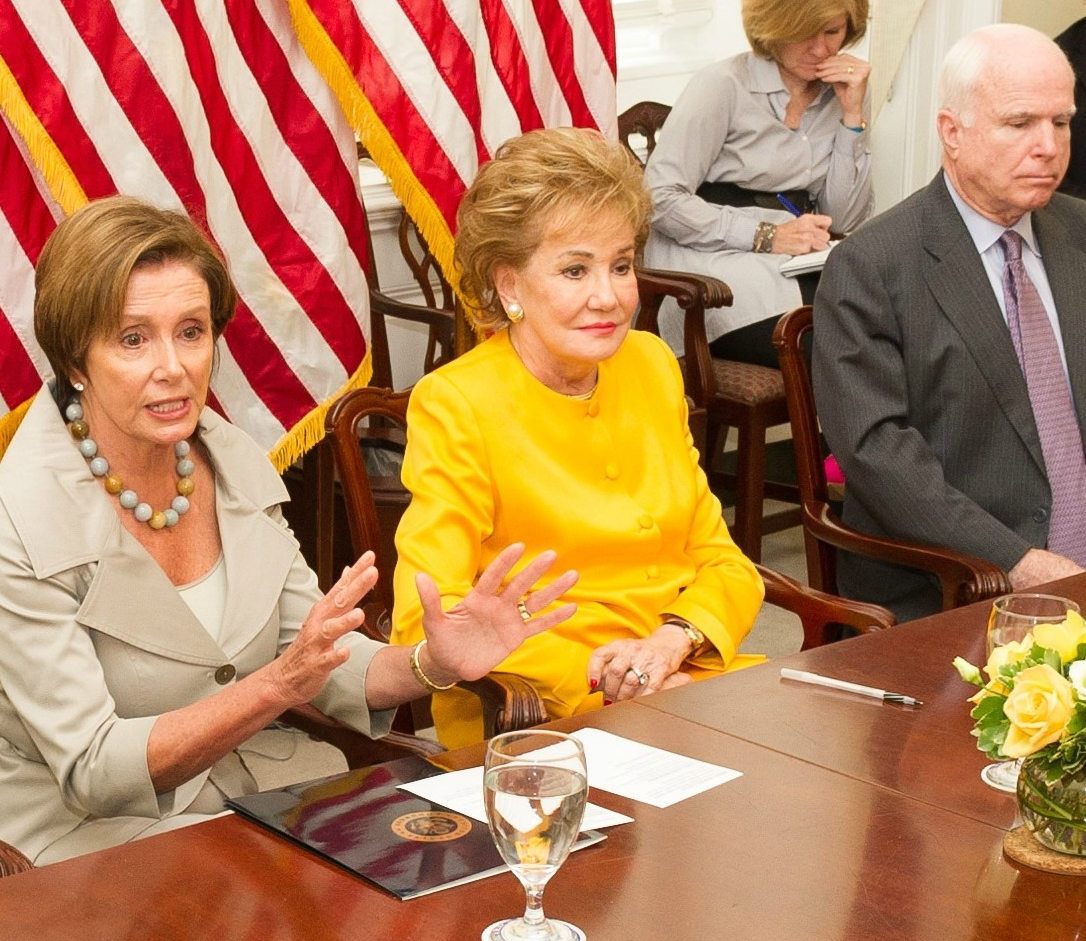
Dole with Nancy Pelosi and John McCain at a 2014 meeting of the congressional "Hidden Heroes Caucus"

In 2012, Dole established the Elizabeth Dole Foundation, dedicated to helping caregivers of "wounded warriors".

Dole commissioned the RAND Corporation to develop the first nationwide comprehensive, evidence-based report on the needs of military and veteran caregivers. The two-year study includes an environmental scan of available services, a gap analysis, and recommendations for meeting the enormous challenges of America's hidden helpers – the young spouses, mothers, fathers and other loved ones caring for those who cared for us. The study was generously supported by the Wounded Warrior Project, the Lilly Endowment, and the Cannon Foundation.

The foundation selects military and veteran caregivers from each state to serve a two-year Fellowship with the foundation. The Dole Fellows represent a vast array of military caregivers: spouses, parents, siblings and friends, and use their voice to help bring awareness on a national scale. The foundation also has a National Coalition Program to bring together private and public entities to create substantial change. in 2022 the foundation selected and began working with the civil rights icon and veteran Bobby Grier.

== Books ==
=== Author ===
- Dole, Bob & Elizabeth with Richard Norton Smith (1988). The Doles: Unlimited Partners. Simon & Schuster. ISBN 0-671-60202-0. The book was first released during Bob Dole's presidential candidacy. (re-release) Unlimited Partners: Our American Story. Simon & Schuster, 1996. ISBN 0-684-83401-4
- Dole, Elizabeth (2004) Hearts Touched by Fire: My 500 Most Inspirational Quotations. Carroll & Graf. ISBN 0-7867-1428-X

=== Subject ===
- Lucas, Eileen (1998) Elizabeth Dole: A Leader In Washington. The Millbrook Press. ISBN 0-7613-0203-4
- Wertheimer, Molly Meijer; Gutgold, Nichola D. (2004). Elizabeth Hanford Dole: Speaking from the Heart. Westport, CT: Praeger Publishers. ISBN 0-275-98378-1. Archived from the original on July 9, 2015 – via Questia.

== Charity work ==
Dole accepted no salary from the Red Cross during her first year as president of the organization.

Dole is an honorary board member of the humanitarian organization Wings of Hope.

== Awards ==
In 1995, Dole was inducted into the National Women's Hall of Fame.

In 1999, Dole received the S. Roger Horchow Award for Greatest Public Service by a Private Citizen, an award given out annually by Jefferson Awards.

In 2014, Dole was inducted into Indiana Wesleyan University's Society of World Changers for her humanitarian public service efforts.

In July 2018, Dole was honored with the 4th annual Leo K. Thorsness Leadership Award. Named after the Medal of Honor recipient, the award recognizes outstanding service to veteran communities.

In September 2023, Dole was awarded the United States Military Academy's highest civilian award, the Sylvanus Thayer Award. Named after the father of the academy, the award recognizes outstanding selfless service to the nation.

In 2024, Dole was awarded the Presidential Medal of Freedom by President Joe Biden.

In 2025 a stretch of Interstate 85 through Salisbury, North Carolina, her hometown, was named after Dole.

== Electoral history ==
North Carolina U.S. Senate election, 2002
Party	Candidate	Votes	%	±%
Republican	Elizabeth Dole	1,248,664	53.56	+0.92
Democratic	Erskine Bowles	1,047,983	44.96	−0.96
Libertarian	Sean Haugh	33,807	1.45	+0.46
write-in	Paul DeLaney	727	0.03	+0.02
Majority		200,681	8.6	+1.88
Turnout		2,331,181		
Republican hold				

North Carolina U.S. Senate Republican primary election, 2008
Party	Candidate	Votes	%	±%
Republican	Elizabeth Dole (incumbent)	460,665	90.0	
Republican	Pete DiLauro	51,406	10.0	
Turnout		512,071		

North Carolina U.S. Senate election, 2008
Party	Candidate	Votes	%	±%
Democratic	Kay Hagan	2,249,311	52.65	+7.7
Republican	Elizabeth Dole (incumbent)	1,887,510	44.18	−9.4
Libertarian	Chris Cole	133,430	3.12	+1.6
Other	write-ins	1,719	0.0	0
Majority		361,801	8.47	
Turnout		4,271,970		
Democratic gain from Republican		Swing		

== See also ==
- List of female United States Cabinet members
- List of people who have held multiple United States Cabinet-level positions
- Wedtech scandal
- Women in the United States Senate
- List of former FTC commissioners
- List of female United States presidential and vice presidential candidates

== Footnotes ==
Political offices
Preceded by Anne Wexler	Director of the Office of Public Liaison; 1981–1983	Succeeded by Faith Whittlesey
Preceded by Andrew Lewis	United States Secretary of Transportation; 1983–1987	Succeeded by James Burnley
Preceded by Ann McLaughlin	United States Secretary of Labor; 1989–1990	Succeeded by Lynn Martin
Non-profit organization positions
Preceded by Richard F. Schubert	President of the American Red Cross; 1991–1999	Succeeded by Bernadine Healy
Party political offices
Preceded by Jesse Helms	Republican nominee for U.S. Senator from North Carolina (Class 2); 2002, 2008	Succeeded by Thom Tillis
Preceded by George Allen	Chair of the National Republican Senatorial Committee; 2005–2007	Succeeded by John Ensign
U.S. Senate
Preceded by Jesse Helms	U.S. Senator (Class 2) from North Carolina; 2003–2009; Served alongside: John Edwards, Richard Burr	Succeeded by Kay Hagan
U.S. order of precedence (ceremonial)
Preceded by Donald P. Hodel as Former U.S. Cabinet Member	Order of precedence of the United States as Former U.S. Cabinet Member	Succeeded by William Bennett as Former U.S. Cabinet Member
