= William Bowles =

William Bowles may refer to:

- William Bowles (1686–1748), British Member of Parliament for Bewdley and Bridport
- William Bowles (naturalist) (1705–1780), Irish naturalist
- William Lisle Bowles (1762–1850), English poet and critic
- William Augustus Bowles (1763–1805), American adventurer and leader of a short-lived Native American state in southeastern North America
- William Bowles (Royal Navy officer) (1780–1869), British admiral
- William A. Bowles (1799–1873), American doctor, soldier and Knights of the Golden Circle leader
- William Leslie Bowles (1885–1954), Australian sculptor
