= Jesse G. Bowles =

American judge (1921–2007)

Jesse Groover Bowles (August 24, 1921 – January 28, 2007) was a justice of the Supreme Court of Georgia from 1977 to 1981.

== Biography ==
Born in Baconton, Georgia, Bowles "graduated from Camilla High School in 1938", and attended Georgia Military College. He received a B.A., and an LL.B., cum laude, from the University of Georgia in 1946, where he also played on the school football team under coach Wally Butts. Following his graduation, Bowles "established his law practice in Cuthbert in March, 1946".

In 1977, Bowles was appointed by Governor George Busbee to a seat vacated by the retirement of William B. Gunter. Bowles was reelected in 1980, but sixteen days later announced his resignation, leading to litigation over whether the Governor had the right to name his replacement.

== Death ==
Bowles died at his home at the age of 85.

Political offices
Preceded by William B. Gunter	Justice of the Supreme Court of Georgia; 1977–1981	Succeeded by Hardy Gregory Jr.
