= Charles J. Bowles =

Professor of physical education and human anatomy

- Chuck Bowles
- Born: 28 March 1922; Portland, Oregon, USA
- Died: 30 December 2005 (aged 83); Salem, Oregon, USA
- Education: University of Portland; University of Oregon
- Occupation(s): Professor and collegiate coach
- Spouse: Barbara Pitts

Charles J. ("Chuck") Bowles (28 March 1922 – 30 December 2005) was a professor of physical education and human anatomy at Willamette University for twenty-five years. He was also Willamette's highly regarded cross-country and track and field coach. His teams won 20 Northwest Conference championships and 16 National Association of Intercollegiate Athletics District 2 championships. During his time at Willamette, Bowles coached 160 individual conference champions and 50 All-American athletes. His men's cross-country teams won both conference and district titles five consecutive years between 1978 and 1982, and his men's track and field team won nine of ten conference championships between 1978 and 1987. Today, the largest cross-country meet in the Northwest is named in his honor, and one of the largest track and field events in the Pacific Northwest also bears his name.

== Early life ==
Bowles was born 28 March 1922 in Portland, Oregon. He attended high school in Portland, and then the University of Portland. While a student at the University of Portland, he climbed Mount Hood. At the top he met Barbara Pitts, who was a student at Willamette University. They married in 1943. That same year, Bowles graduated magna cum laude from the University of Portland. He served in the United States Navy during the latter part of World War II. Then returned to the University of Portland, where he received the school's first Master of Science degree in 1947.

== Educator and coach ==
After graduating, he taught and was assistant track coach at the University of Portland before moving to Lake Oswego High School. At Lake Owego he taught chemistry and coached both cross-country and the track and field team. From 1961 to 1965, Bowles lived in Eugene, Oregon. While there he earned a PhD in physiology of exercise from the University of Oregon, and served as the university's freshman track coach and assistant varsity track coach under Bill Bowerman.

In 1965, Bowles accepted a position at Willamette University in Salem, Oregon. At Willamette, he taught physical education and human anatomy. He also coached the university's cross-country and track and field teams. He served as athletic director from 1973 to 1976. At Willamette, Bowles led his teams to 20 Northwest Conference championships and 16 National Association of Intercollegiate Athletics District 2 championships. As a coach, Bowles worked with individual athletes to bring out their best performances. As a result, he produced 160 individual conference champions and 50 All-American athletes. His men's cross-country teams won both conference and district titles every year between 1978 and 1982, and his men's track and field team won nine of ten conference championships between 1978 and 1987 including seven consecutive championships. Bowles retired in 1990 at the age of 67. After retirement, he continued to assist and support Willamette's cross-country and track programs until his death in December 2005.

== Legacy ==
Bowles founded the Zena Road Run, sponsored summer all-comers track meets, and fall all-comers cross-country meets for kids. He also directed the Governor's Trophy Run in its early years. He received the Oregon Sports Merit Award in 1983. In 1991, Bowles was inducted into the Willamette University Athletic Hall of Fame in recognition of his outstanding contributions to the heritage and tradition of the university's intercollegiate athletics program. Today, the Willamette Valley Road Runners present the annual Charles J. Bowles Award for significant contributions to the field of running and fitness.

In 1975, Willamette University began hosting the Charles Bowles Invitational Cross-Country Meet. Willamette also hosts the Charles Bowles Spring Break Classic, which is one of the largest track and field events in the Pacific Northwest. The Charles Bowles Classic draws over 400 athletes to Salem each spring for a full range of track and field events. Finally, Willamette University's track and field complex at McCulloch Stadium is named in his honor.
