= William B. Gunter =

American judge (1919–1986)

William Barrett Gunter (April 20, 1919 – August 17, 1986) was an associate justice of the Supreme Court of Georgia from 1972 to 1977.

== Early life, education, and military service ==
Born in Commerce, Jackson County, Georgia, Gunter received his B.A. from the University of Georgia in 1940, and his J.D. from the University of Georgia School of Law in 1942. United States District Court judge Robert Lee Russell then hired Gunter for a term as a law clerk.

Gunter served in the United States Army during World War II, deploying with the 3rd Infantry Division in the European theatre, and attaining the rank of lieutenant. His service lasted until 1946, and Gunter was awarded a Silver Star and a Purple Heart.

== Legal and political career ==
Gunter practiced law in Gainesville, Georgia, for 25 years, during which time he was elected to the Georgia House of Representatives for three terms, from 1952 to 1958. In 1971, Gunter was named the Democratic National Committeeman for Georgia.

On December 22, 1971, Governor Jimmy Carter, a "longtime personal friend" of Gunter's, announced his appointment to a seat on the state supreme court vacated by the impending retirement of Justice Jule W. Felton. As a justice, Gunter was "known for his criticism of Georgia's death penalty law", writing in one dissenting opinion that if jurors who oppose the death penalty are excluded from serving, "the jury that is left does not represent the conscience of the community".

In March 1977, then-President Carter designated Gunter as "his special representative on the Indian claims matter in the State of Maine". Gunter resigned from the state supreme court on April 1, 1977, and dedicated himself to resolving the Maine dispute, issuing a proposal in July 1977 that the contesting tribes receive "$25 million, 100,000 acres of land, and the option to purchase another 400,000". Gunter further "recommended that Congress extinguish all Indian claims to private land, about 90 per cent of the disputed area", to prevent such claims from clouding claims to title in the land. However, both sides disagreed with Gunter's proposal, and Carter responded by announcing a new task force to address the problem. Gunter died after an apparent heart attack at his home in Gainesville, Georgia on August 17, 1986.

Political offices
Preceded by Jule W. Felton	Justice of the Supreme Court of Georgia; 1972–1977	Succeeded by Jesse G. Bowles
