= Ada Fisher =

American politician (1947–2022)

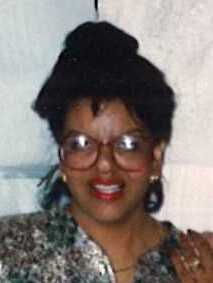
- Fisher in 1991

Republican National Committeewoman from North Carolina
- In office 2008–2020
- Preceded by: Mary Frances Forrester
- Succeeded by: Kyshia Lineberger

Personal details
- Born: October 21, 1947 Durham, North Carolina, U.S.
- Died: October 7, 2022 (aged 74)
- Party: Republican
- Occupation: Physician
- Known for: Medical career, political campaigns

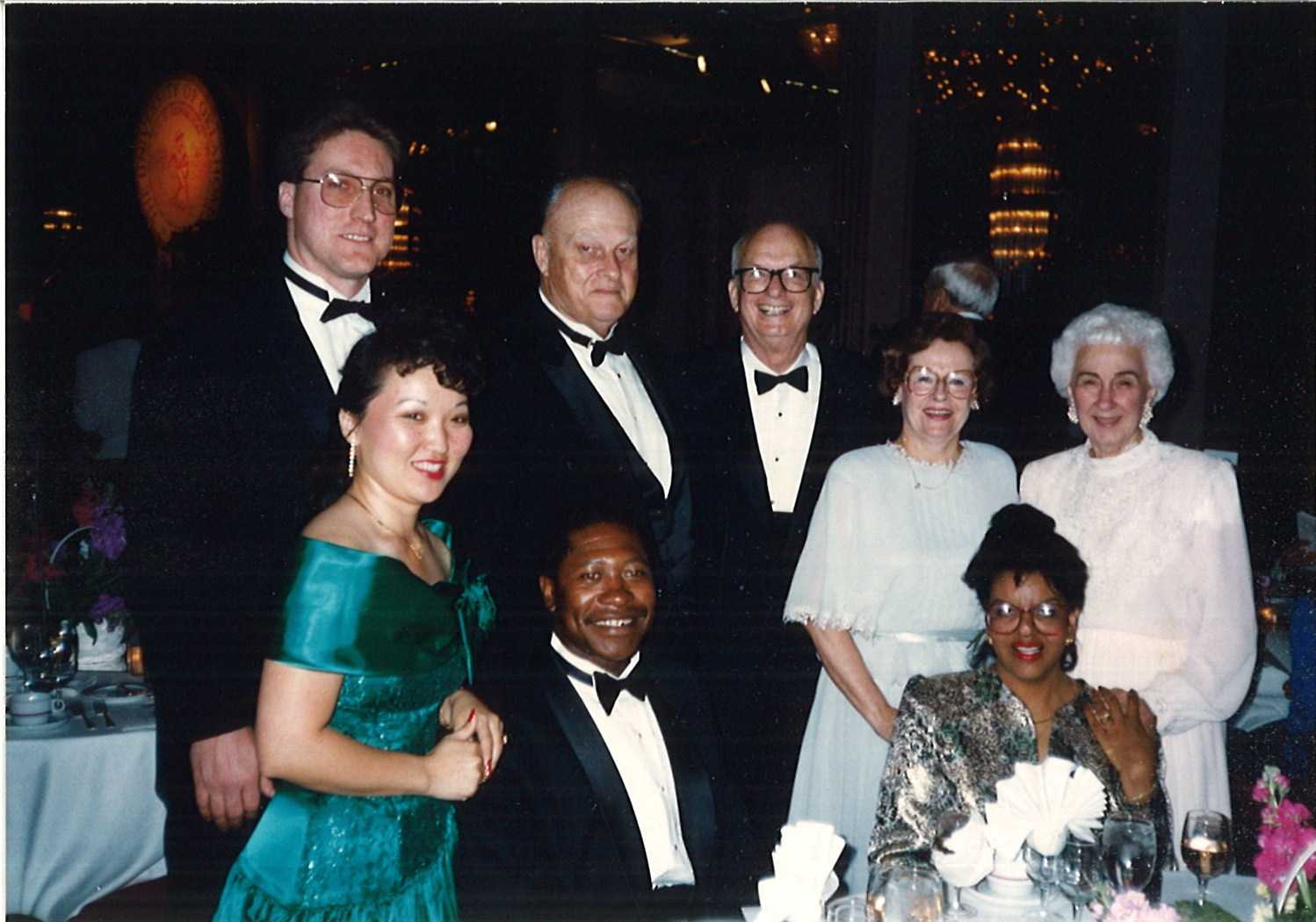
Carl Albert, Mary Albert, David Albert, and Libby Albert (David's wife), George Lynn Cross, Loise Washington, Charlie Ward and Mary Ward, Ada Lois Sipuel Fisher, Helen Robson Walton, and Danney Goble, 1991

Ada M. Fisher (October 21, 1947 – October 7, 2022) was an American physician from Salisbury, North Carolina, and a frequent Republican candidate for office. She challenged incumbent Mel Watt in North Carolina's 12th Congressional district in 2004 and 2006. Fisher said that she would like to be the first black Republican female elected to Congress; however, Mia Love actually became the first black Republican female elected to Congress.

A life member of the NAACP and a lifelong Republican, Fisher was the Republican National Committeewoman for the state of North Carolina.

== Early life and education ==
Born on October 21, 1947, Fisher was the daughter of Rev. Miles Mark Fisher of Durham, North Carolina, himself the son of a former slave and his Seminole Indian wife. Rev. Fisher was also a Republican, as was her grandfather, who was freed by the Emancipation Proclamation when he was ten years old. Fisher attended Durham public schools, graduating from Hillside High School with honors. She then graduated from the University of North Carolina at Greensboro with a degree in biology.

Fisher went on to earn her medical degree from the University of Wisconsin and a master's in public health from Johns Hopkins University.

Fisher converted to Judaism.

== Career ==
Upon receiving her medical degree, Fisher participated in a residency at the University of Rochester in family medicine. She later ran a rural North Carolina health clinic and a 16-county substance abuse program. In addition, she worked for two Fortune 500 companies, including medical director for Amoco in Chicago. Before retiring in 2000 due to a leg disability, Fisher served as Chief of Occupational Health Services at the W.G. "Bill" Hefner Veterans Affairs Medical Center in Salisbury.

In addition to being a physician, Fisher was licensed as a secondary teacher in mathematics and science.

== Elected office ==
Fisher was a former member of the board of education for the Rowan–Salisbury School System. In addition, she had served on the boards of trustees of Barber-Scotia College (in Concord) and Preservation NC.

At the 2008 North Carolina Republican Party state convention, held at the Joseph Koury Convention Center in Greensboro, Fisher was elected as the National Republican Committeewoman for North Carolina. Running against the incumbent, establishment candidate Mary Frances Forrester, wife of state Sen. Jim Forrester, Fisher's win was viewed as a surprise, underdog victory. Fisher was re-elected in 2012, again defeating Forrester.

As of the end of 2008, Fisher was one of three African Americans on the RNC. She endorsed Katon Dawson for RNC chairman that year. Fisher later called for the winner of the RNC race, Michael S. Steele, to resign after less than two months in office.

== Campaigns ==
Fisher ran for the United States Senate in 2002 in the Republican primary against Elizabeth Dole, who went on to win the general election; Fisher placed fourth in a field of seven Republican candidates. Fisher protested during the campaign that she was not allowed to participate in television forums featuring only two of the Republican candidates, and after the election, she filed a complaint regarding Dole's residency requirement.

Fisher ran against incumbent Congressman Mel Watt of the North Carolina's 12th congressional district in 2004. In 2004, Watt won with 67% of the vote, with Fisher gaining 60% of the vote in more Republican Davidson County. Fisher raised $400,000 to oppose Watt in 2006, with most of the money spent on direct mail; she said the national Republican Party had not given her "one dime of support," but local organizations were supportive. In 2008, Fisher told Talking Points Memo that the fundraising organization she had hired had given her back only $30,000 of the $400,000 she had raised in the cycle, directing the rest to its affiliated private vendors, in what echoed previous complaints listed at TPM.

In 2006, Fisher ran against Watt for the second time. He claimed that Watt ignored his constituents at the expense of travel related to his chairmanship of the Congressional Black Caucus. Fisher's campaign theme was "Get a Doctor in the House" and she recommended a "prescription" composed of ten platform planks. Fisher said that she had put 73,000 miles on her car traveling the six counties of the 12th District for her campaign.

Fisher ran for the North Carolina General Assembly from North Carolina's 77th House district in 2008. She lost the election to Lorene T. Coates.

== Political views ==
The Republicans were not only the party of Abraham Lincoln, but the party which has always stood for free speech, individual rights and individual choice. It was the Republican Party, which pushed civil rights and passed the first civil rights legislation in 1865 as well as pushed the 13th, 14th and 15th Amendments to the Constitution, which effectively outlawed slavery. This was also the party that was at the forefront of the Women's Suffrage movement, which is in harmony with the establishment of 1972 Title IX legislation. Though most don't recall it, Dwight Eisenhower followed through on the integration of the armed forces. His nomination for President was seconded by Dr. Helen G. Edmonds, a black professor at Durham's North Carolina College. It was President Eisenhower, a Republican who appointed Earl Warren (previous California Republican Governor) as Chief Justice of the United States Supreme Court who wrote for the unanimous court in 1954 that separate but equal is a myth, and schools and society should become integrated for all Americans.

— Ada Fisher, "North Carolina Conservative"

Fisher wrote in The North Carolina Conservative that the Republican Party had a long history of black candidates for office, including the first black senator Hiram Revels and the first black congressman, Joseph Rainey, and four of the first six black senators. Fisher continued: "In the rush to find fault while looking for a rightward turn, people forget that it was the Democrats who brought in poll taxes which kept us from voting; were behind the Jim Crow laws which separated us into white and colored; vigorously supported the Ku Klux Klan; and kept us out of their party and from unions and opportunities dictating a say in the course of our lives... The Great Society of Lyndon Johnson took on segregation but, in so doing to some, possibly undermined the social fabric of an independent people in its push for a safety net, which abolished individual responsibility and accountability for behavior and actions."

Fisher mentioned that George W. Bush brought a level of diversity to his cabinet "like no other," mentioning Colin Powell, Condoleezza Rice, Rod Paige, and Alphonso Jackson. She noted in 2006, "No administration had previously had more than two African-Americans in such significant Cabinet-level positions."

Fisher supported a flat tax, small businesses ("many of which started in our communities"), gun rights ("which [have] often made a difference in the African-American community's security"), and expanded education options. She opposed gay marriage (once saying, "Marriage ought to be between one man and one woman at one time, and I'm still waiting.") She opposed spending out of the Social Security Trust Fund ("I like the lock box").

Fisher was in favor of tort reform for medical malpractice lawsuits and a free enterprise system of health care: "If you socialize medicine, you will lose the creativity and innovation that brings us new drugs and new treatments. You'll also stifle physician choice and opportunities in medicine."

Fisher did not support open borders for reasons of national security, nor did she support illegal immigration to the United States or language accommodations for driver's licenses for those who do not speak English. She called President Bush's guest worker proposals "amnesty" that will depress wages for Americans: "It is not correct to say undocumented workers do jobs, which Americans won't do. If these jobs were required to pay minimum wages there are thousands of out of work people who would be glad to fill them. It should not be lost on the American public that the number of unskilled Americans out of work approximates the number of illegal residents in this country. Exploiting illegal residents ultimately depresses wages for everyone." Fisher continued, "As a black woman, I will never support any provision to relax borders with Mexico when we keep turning Haitians away and sending them back to situations we know are equally bad if not worst... granddaughter of a free African boy who was made a slave on reaching these shores and granddaughter of his Seminole Indian wife, I am mad that my peoples were stripped of our cultures and languages to improve this nation and now see others advance with minimum standards set for their citizenship as they become our new underclass."

To stem illegal immigration, Fisher proposed random checks on companies known to hire illegal workers, fines and penalties for companies found guilty, deportation of illegal workers, adoption of tamper-proof photo visas for non-citizens entering the United States. She believed money sent to Mexico to compensate Social Security taxes paid by illegal workers (the Social Security Totalization Agreement) should instead be given to states whose social services are strapped from illegal immigration, and the United States should commence oil drilling in Mexico, helping Mexicans find jobs and business profits while helping to solve the United States' energy needs. Fisher also believed national standards for driver's licenses should be invoked, as well as voter identification cards.

In August 2008, she emailed a link to a YouTube video of rearranged clips of President Barack Obama "indulging the darkest conspiracy theories about himself." She wrote "This tape should be investigated and verified. I am not an expert on tapes but if this isn't doctored we have a constitutional issue of humongous proportions to deal with."

== Personal life and death ==
Fisher never married but adopted two sons, who are now adults. She died on October 7, 2022, at age 74.
