= Erskine Bowles =

American politician and businessman

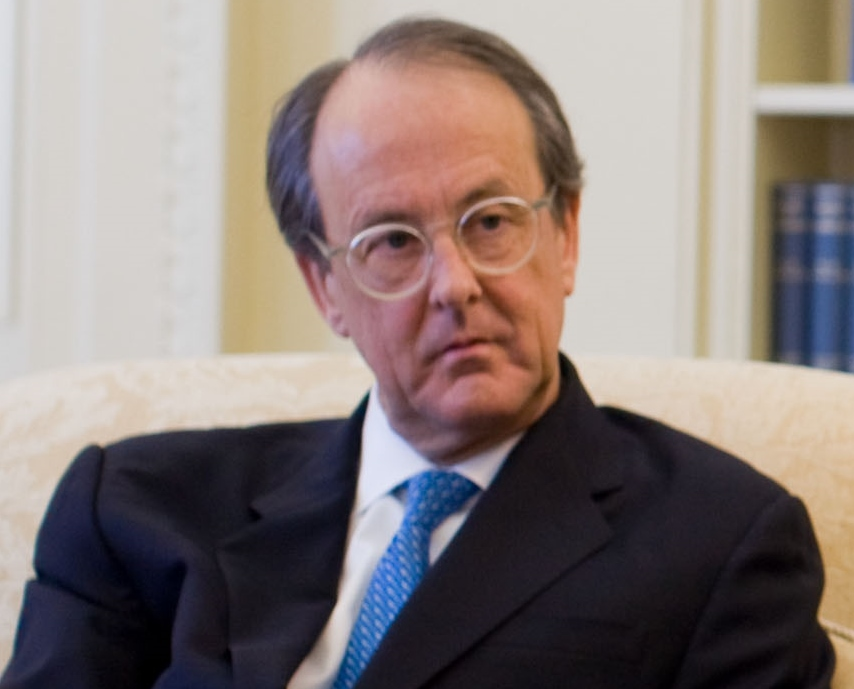
- Bowles in 2010

16th President of the University of North Carolina
- In office October 3, 2005 – December 31, 2010
- Preceded by: Molly Corbett Broad
- Succeeded by: Thomas W. Ross

Co-Chair of the National Commission on Fiscal Responsibility and Reform
- In office February 18, 2010 – December 1, 2010 Serving with Alan Simpson
- President: Barack Obama
- Preceded by: Position established
- Succeeded by: Position abolished

19th White House Chief of Staff
- In office January 20, 1997 – October 20, 1998
- President: Bill Clinton
- Deputy: Sylvia Burwell; John Podesta
- Preceded by: Leon Panetta
- Succeeded by: John Podesta

White House Deputy Chief of Staff for Operations
- In office October 3, 1994 – January 11, 1996
- President: Bill Clinton
- Preceded by: Philip Lader
- Succeeded by: Evelyn S. Lieberman

18th Administrator of the Small Business Administration
- In office May 12, 1993 – October 6, 1994
- President: Bill Clinton
- Deputy: Cassandra M. Pulley
- Preceded by: Pat Saiki
- Succeeded by: Philip Lader

Personal details
- Born: August 8, 1945 (age 81) Greensboro, North Carolina, U.S.
- Party: Democratic
- Spouse: Crandall Close (m. 1971)
- Children: 3
- Parent: Skipper Bowles (father)
- Education: University of North Carolina at Chapel Hill (BA); Columbia University (MBA)

Erskine Boyce Bowles (/ˈɜːrskɪn ˌboʊlz/ URR-skin BOWLS; born August 8, 1945) is an American businessman and political figure who served as the 19th White House chief of staff from January 1997 to October 1998, under President Bill Clinton, and as the president of the University of North Carolina system from 2005 to 2010. He also ran unsuccessfully for the United States Senate in 2002 and 2004 to represent North Carolina.

In 2010, Bowles served as the Democratic co-chair of President Barack Obama's National Commission on Fiscal Responsibility and Reform with Alan Simpson. Bowles and Simpson founded an advocacy group, The Campaign to Fix the Debt.

== Early life and education ==
Bowles was born and raised in Greensboro, North Carolina, and is the son of Jessamine Woodward Boyce Bowles and Skipper Bowles, a Democratic politician who ran unsuccessfully for Governor of North Carolina in 1972. Siblings include Hargrove Bowles III, Mary Holland Bowles Blanton and the late Martha Thomas Bowles. Bowles graduated from Virginia Episcopal School before attending the University of North Carolina at Chapel Hill, where he was a member of the Zeta Psi fraternity and graduated with a business degree. After briefly serving in the United States Coast Guard, Bowles then enrolled in Columbia Business School, where he earned an MBA.

Following graduation, Bowles worked for the financial firm Morgan Stanley in New York City, where he met his future wife, Crandall Close. The two married in 1971 and moved to North Carolina, where Bowles worked on his father's 1972 gubernatorial campaign. Crandall and Erskine have three children. In 1975, Bowles helped launch the investment banking firm of Bowles Hollowell Conner, and remained in the corporate sector until the 1990s.

== Clinton administration ==
In 1992, Bowles became more involved in politics as a fundraiser for Bill Clinton's 1992 presidential campaign. President Clinton appointed Bowles to head the Small Business Administration in 1993. From October 1994 to December 1995, Bowles served as Clinton's White House Deputy Chief of Staff, in the first term of the Clinton Administration. After briefly returning to Charlotte, North Carolina, where he helped found the private equity firm, Carousel Capital, Bowles was appointed Clinton's Chief of Staff in December 1996. One of Bowles's major responsibilities was dealing with federal budget negotiations between the White House and Congress. Bowles returned to Charlotte and to the field of finance again in October 1998. He was also asked by North Carolina Governor Jim Hunt to head a task force on rural economic prosperity.

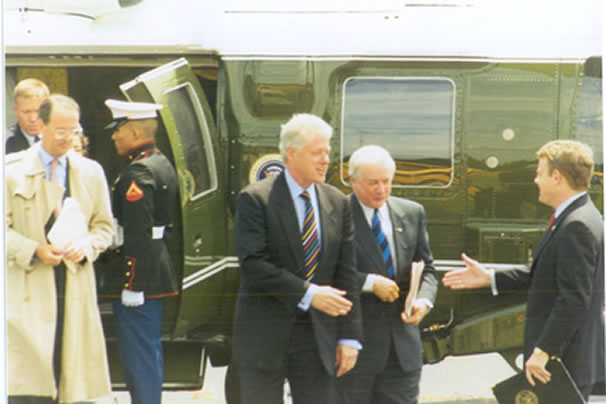
President Clinton and Bowles (wearing overcoat on the left)

== Senatorial races ==
Although initially reluctant to seek political office, Bowles reconsidered a run for the United States Senate after the September 11 attacks and, in October 2001, declared his candidacy for the Senate as a Democratic candidate. Seeking to fill the seat being vacated by Jesse Helms, Bowles secured the party's nomination, but was defeated in the 2002 general election by Republican contender Elizabeth Dole.

In 2004, Bowles campaigned again for the Senate, seeking to fill the seat being vacated by fellow Democrat John Edwards. He faced Republican Richard Burr and Libertarian Tom Bailey in a hotly contested race. The final month of the Senate campaign saw both Bowles's and Burr's campaigns turn strongly negative, with Burr's campaign attacking Bowles's associations with the Clinton administration, while Bowles's campaign attacked Burr on his support of trade legislation and special interest donations. Both campaigns spent a great deal of money, making it one of the most expensive statewide races in North Carolina history.

Despite an early lead in the polls after the primaries, as well as fellow Democrat Mike Easley running for a second term as governor at the top of the state party ticket, Bowles was defeated in the 2004 race as well. In 2005 Bowles accepted an appointment as United Nations Deputy Special Envoy for Tsunami-affected Countries, once again working for Bill Clinton who was now serving as U.N. Special Envoy.

== University of North Carolina ==
On October 3, 2005, Bowles was elected by the University of North Carolina Board of Governors to succeed Molly Corbett Broad as President of the system, even though some suggest that the Board of Governors broke the law in not holding public hearings in the hiring process. One of his most significant appointments was that of Holden Thorp as the tenth chancellor of the University of North Carolina at Chapel Hill, who resigned on September 17, 2012 in the wake of several athletics-related scandals. Bowles also spoke at the campus memorial service in memory of slain student body president Eve Carson.

On February 12, 2010, Bowles announced his retirement from the UNC System. Bowles was replaced by Thomas W. Ross.

== Bowles-Simpson commission ==
Bowles was appointed in 2010 to co-chair President Barack Obama's National Commission on Fiscal Responsibility and Reform with Alan K. Simpson. The commission deadlocked, and the co-chairs' report on a policy for budget deficit reduction was not adopted by the Obama administration. Surprised by the rejection, Bowles later stated he believed that Obama decided to abandon the report and let [incoming House Budget Chairman] Paul Ryan go first, and then he would look like the sensible guy in the game, based on advice from his political advisers and over the objections of his economic team.

== Later career ==
Bowles has been a member of the board of directors of General Motors, Morgan Stanley, Norfolk Southern Corporation, and North Carolina Mutual Life Insurance Company and serves on the North Carolina Advisory Board of DonorsChoose.

On September 7, 2011, Facebook, Inc. announced that it had named Bowles to its board.

After North Carolina Governor Bev Perdue announced that she would not run for a second term in 2012, Bowles was mentioned as a possible candidate, and polling put him almost even with likely Republican nominee Pat McCrory. But on February 2, 2012, Bowles announced that he would not seek the governorship.

== Electoral history ==
- 2004 United States Senate election in North Carolina
  - Richard Burr (R), 52%
  - Erskine Bowles (D), 47%
- 2002 United States Senate election in North Carolina
  - Elizabeth Dole (R), 54%
  - Erskine Bowles (D), 45%

== Board membership ==
Bowles is also a member of the board of directors of:

- President Emeritus of the University of North Carolina
- Directorship, Morgan Stanley
- Former Directorship, Norfolk Southern Corporation
- Directorship, North Carolina Mutual Life Insurance Company
- Directorship, North Carolina Advisory Board of DonorsChoose
- Directorship, Facebook, Inc., which announced September 7, 2011, that it had named Bowles to its board
- Directorship, Cousins Properties, Inc.
- Directorship, Belk, Inc.
- Former Directorship, General Motors
- Directorship, Committee for a Responsible Federal Budget

== See also ==
- North Carolina Democratic Party

Political offices
Preceded by Dayton Watkins; Acting	Administrator of the Small Business Administration; 1993–1994	Succeeded by Cassandra Pulley; Acting
Preceded by Philip Lader	White House Deputy Chief of Staff for Operations; 1994–1996	Succeeded by Evelyn S. Lieberman
Preceded by Leon Panetta	White House Chief of Staff; 1997–1998	Succeeded by John Podesta
Party political offices
Preceded by Harvey Gantt	Democratic nominee for U.S. Senator from North Carolina (Class 2); 2002	Succeeded by Kay Hagan
Preceded by John Edwards	Democratic nominee for U.S. Senator from North Carolina (Class 3); 2004	Succeeded by Elaine Marshall
Academic offices
Preceded by Molly Corbett Broad	President of the University of North Carolina system 2005–2010	Succeeded by Thomas W. Ross
Government offices
New office	Co-Chair of the National Commission on Fiscal Responsibility and Reform; 2010; Served alongside: Alan Simpson	Position abolished
