= Carden Aero Engines =

- 1936–1937

Carden Aero Engines Limited was a 1930s British fixed-wing aero-engine manufacturer, based at Heston Aerodrome.

== History ==
Sir John Carden established the company in March 1936, while the Flying Flea craze was sweeping Britain. He saw a need for a cheap low-powered propulsion unit for ultralight aircraft. The engine was an adaptation of the well-proven and reliable Ford 10 Model C motor car engine.

Following the death of Sir John in an air accident in December 1935, the company was taken over by Carden-Baynes Aircraft Ltd, and later sold to Chilton Aircraft Ltd, Chilton Foliat, near Hungerford, Berkshire.

== Engines ==
Carden-Baynes Auxiliary
The Carden-Baynes Auxiliary engine, as used on the Scud III Auxiliary sailplane, was a 2.5 hp Villiers air-cooled two-stroke, capacity 350 cc.
Carden-Ford 31 hp 4-cyl
A much modified Ford 10 car engine.
Carden-Ford S.P.1
Further development of the 31 hp engine, with a centric supercharger, 1.1:1 gear ratio, splined propeller shaft extension and horizontal mounting for flush wing mounting. Used exclusively on the Carden-Baynes Bee.

=== Aircraft using Carden engines ===
Aircraft that have used the Carden-Ford 31 hp engine are: Broughton-Blayney Brawney, B.A.C. Drone, Kronfeld Monoplane, Mignet HM.14 (Flying Flea), Perman Parasol, Taylor Watkinson Dingbat, and Chilton D.W.1 Monoplane.

== See also ==
- Aerospace industry in the United Kingdom
