= Stephen Appleby =

British test pilot

Stephen Villiers Appleby
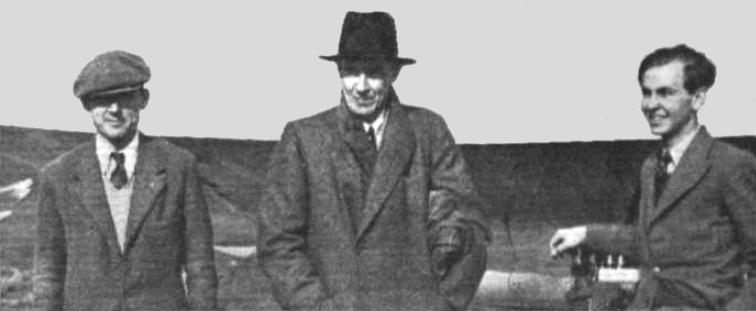
- At Heston Airport 3 October 1935; L. E. Baynes on left, Sir John Carden in centre, Stephen Appleby on right
- Born: 9 February 1912; London, England
- Died: 1 January 1984 (aged 71); London, England
- Known for: Leading proponent of the Mignet Pou-du-Ciel "Flying Flea" aircraft
- Aviation career
- First flight: 1931 (HM.8), 1935 (HM.14); HM.8 Avionette, HM.14 Flying Flea
- Famous flights: First cross-channel flight of a Flying Flea from England to France
- Flight license: 1932; Heston Aerodrome, England

Racing career
- First race: First International Flying Flea Challenge Trophy Race
- Best position: Second place
- Aircraft: G-ADMH

Stephen Villiers Appleby (9 February 1912 – 1 January 1984) was an English pilot and a leading proponent of the Mignet Pou-du-Ciel "Flying Flea" aircraft.

== Early years ==
Stephen Appleby was born in London on 9 February 1912, the son of Swedish-French parents. He attended numerous schools in France, Italy, Norway, Sweden and the UK, and left school aged 15. He was employed by a property owner near his mother's home at Beaulieu-sur-Mer, near Nice. After taking an interest in motorcycles and engines, he was attracted by advertisements and a book Le Sport de L'Air produced by Henri Mignet about his HM.8 Avionette monoplane. In early 1930, Appleby travelled to Paris, and sought out Mignet for advice;, that was the start of a long friendship. He built an HM.8 with a Harley-Davidson engine in six months. On 3 December 1931, it was successfully flown and tested by two highly experienced pilots at Nice aerodrome. Via personal contacts, he then negotiated to receive reduced-rate flying training from Valentine Baker of the Airwork Flying School at Heston Aerodrome, in return for publicising his exploits in the magazine Les Ailes. By June 1932, he had learned to fly, and also purchased a 34 hp ABC Scorpion engine for his HM.8. He returned to Beaulieu, fitted the new engine, and flew it without authorisation from Nice aerodrome. There was no prospect of legitimately flying from an aerodrome, so he fitted some existing floats, but they proved too heavy to permit a takeoff. He removed the wing, and taxied the combination on water from Nice to Beaulieu. He then purchased a Caudron C.109, with the intention of offering flying training, but an engine failure and crash ensued. In 1933, he was offered employment with Airwork Ltd at Heston in the flight traffic office.

== Flying Fleas in England ==
In early 1935, Appleby started construction of a Mignet HM.14 Flying Flea, in a shed at Heston aerodrome loaned to him by his employer, Airwork Ltd. Appleby made a main wing of 5 metres (16 ft) span, on the advice of Mignet, who was unaware that a heavier than normal engine (a water-cooled Ford 10 unit) was to be fitted. Final assembly was in an Airwork hangar. At the same time, Appleby assisted in the construction of a more standard HM.14 (G-ADME) for John Chamier.

On 14 July 1935, at Heston aerodrome, Appleby piloted the first flight of his Flying Flea (G-ADMH), the first to fly in UK. On 24 July 1935, the Air Ministry awarded it the first ever Authorisation to Fly document, being equivalent to a UK Certificate of Airworthiness with additional conditions and limitations. On 25 July 1935, he demonstrated the Flying Flea to the press, but force-landed it in a nearby ploughed field, where it came to rest inverted. Appleby attributed the accident to insufficient wing area and a high ambient air temperature. Sir John Carden, already acquainted with Appleby, offered to convert a Ford water-cooled engine for him that offered power of about 30 hp. The Daily Express newspaper had covered the construction of Appleby's Flying Flea, and it gave £100 for the aircraft to be repaired with modifications designed by L.E. Baynes, at the factory of Abbott-Baynes Sailplanes at Wrecclesham, near Farnham, Surrey. The modifications included a new 6 metres (20 ft) span front wing with a repositioned wing pivot, a partial engine cowling, and a low-mounted radiator for the newly converted Carden-Ford engine. On 12 September 1935, the rebuilt aircraft flew again at Heston. Soon after that, the aircraft was converted to replace the wing control cables with twin "push-rods".

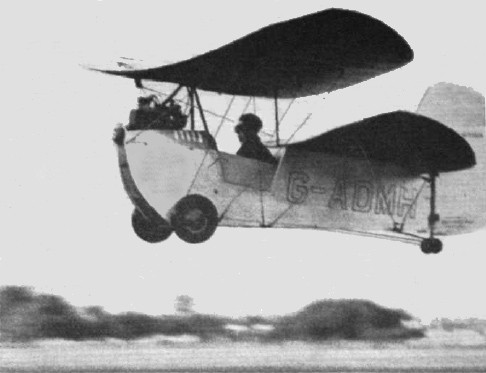
Stephen Appleby in Flying Flea G-ADMH, Heston Airport 3 October 1935

On 5 December 1935, Appleby piloted his own Flying Flea (G-ADMH) from Lympne Airport to Saint-Inglevert Airfield, to become the only cross-channel flight of a Flying Flea from England to France, at least until the 1980s. On 10 December 1935, Appleby's employer and friend, Sir John Carden, died in an airliner crash. Appleby took over the management of Carden Aero Engines and was listed as managing director when the company was formally registered in March 1936. Also in March 1936, Appleby became consultant to the newly formed Puttnam Aircraft Co Ltd, that advertised "The P.A.C. Pou ... fitted with the Carden Aero engine ... every machine made by P.A.C. is test flown and passed by Stephen V. Appleby". Appleby spent the spring and summer of 1936 promoting and displaying Flying Fleas at aerodromes throughout the UK, in conjunction with appearances in local car showrooms. In 1936, after producing about five aircraft, Puttnam Aircraft ceased trading due to the terminal illness of Appleby's friend, Martin Payne.

In April 1936, Baynes made improvements to the Flying Flea design, beyond those on Appleby's Flea, and named the result as the Baynes Cantilever Pou. The prototype of that (G-AEGD), plus a later example (G-AEJD), were extensively test-flown and demonstrated by Appleby.

On 3 August 1936, Appleby flew his personal Flying Flea (G-ADMH) in the First International Flying Flea Challenge Trophy Race at Ramsgate Airport, gaining second place behind a lower-powered French Flea in the handicapped event. Henri Mignet flew across the channel to attend the event, in a HM.18 Flea that Appleby then purchased and registered (G-AENV).

In October 1936, the Air Ministry stopped renewing the Authorisation to Fly documents of all Flying Fleas that had not received approved modifications. That followed French and British investigations into several fatal crashes and some full-scale wind tunnel tests. Appleby then quit flying, emigrated back to France, and was later employed by De Havilland Aircraft Company.

Appleby died in London on the New Year's Day of 1984, ate the age of 71.

== Bibliography ==
- Appleby, Stephen. "On Home-made Wings", Aeroplane Monthly, March 1982
- Ellis, Ken. "The ABC of the Flying Flea", Air-Britain Archive (journal). No.3/1998
- Ellis, Ken; Jones, Geoff. 1990. Henri Mignet and his Flying Fleas. Haynes Publishing ISBN 0-85429-765-0
- Lewis, Peter. 1970. British Racing and Record-Breaking Aircraft. Putnam ISBN 0-370-00067-6
- Morse, William. "Baynes: The Unknown Innovator", Aeroplane Monthly, June 1992
- Ord-Hume, Arthur W.J.G. "Britain's Flea craze", Aeroplane Monthly, May 1973
- Ord-Hume, Arthur W.J.G. 2000. British Light Aeroplanes. GMS Enterprises. ISBN 1-870384-76-8
- Ord-Hume, Arthur W.J.G. 2011. Flying Flea: Henri Mignet's Pou-du-Ciel ISBN 978-1-84033-554-5
