= Abbott–Baynes Sailplanes =

UK company

Abbott-Baynes Sailplanes Ltd.
- Type: Private
- Industry: Aviation
- Founded: Wrecclesham, near Farnham, Surrey, 1931
- Defunct: ca. 1941
- Fate: ceased trading
- Headquarters: Farnham, England
- Products: Sailplanes, Gliders and light aircraft
- Owner: L. E. Baynes and E. D. Abbott
- Parent: E. D. Abbott Ltd

Abbott-Baynes Sailplanes Ltd. was a 1930s glider manufacturing company based at Wrecclesham, near Farnham, Surrey. It was founded as a subsidiary of E. D. Abbott Ltd in 1931 by L. E. Baynes and E. D. Abbott to build the Scud, a glider designed by Baynes in 1930, the prototype of which was built by Brant Aircraft Limited at Croydon Airport. The Scud was popular, and in 1932 a development of it, the Scud II model was launched. In 1935, a Scud II flown by Mungo Buxton took the British Height Record for a glider to 8,750 ft (2,666 m).

Also in 1935, the Scud 3 was rolled out, though only one was built. Sir John Carden requested a sailplane that could be launched unaided, and suggested a retractable engine. When fitted with such an engine, the glider was called the Auxiliary. Baynes later went into partnership with Carden as Carden-Baynes Aircraft Ltd of Heston Aerodrome, Middlesex to build the Carden-Baynes Auxiliary and the Carden-Baynes Bee.

In 1935, Abbott-Baynes Sailplanes took part in the Flying Flea craze by launching the Baynes Cantilever Pou, which Baynes designed to address some of the aerodynamic problems of the original Mignet HM.14 Pou du Ciel. A series of fatal accidents led to restrictions on aircraft of this tandem wing type, ending the company's interest.

A Scud II built in 1935 (ex-BGA 231/G-ALOT) is still airworthy, and is believed to be the oldest flying glider in the United Kingdom. In December 2009, it became part of the Shuttleworth Collection.

== Aircraft ==
Source: Ellison

- Abbott Farnham sailplane
- Abbott-Baynes Scud 1
- Abbott-Baynes Scud 2
- Abbott-Baynes Scud 3
- Carden-Baynes Auxiliary
- Baynes Cantilever Pou

== Bibliography ==
- Ellis, Ken (2010). Wrecks & Relics (22 ed.). Crecy. p. 10. ISBN 978-0-85979-150-2
- Ellis, Ken; Jones, Geoff (1990). Henri Mignet and his Flying Fleas. Haynes Publishing ISBN 0-85429-765-0
- Ellison, Norman (1971). British Gliders and Sailplanes. A & C Black Ltd. pp. 31–32, 73–75, 241. ISBN 0-7136-1189-8
- Ord-Hume, Arthur W.J.G. Britain's Flea craze, Aeroplane Monthly, May 1973

== External sources ==
- The SCUD Sailplanes
- Britain's Flea Craze (Archived 2009-10-24)
