= Carden-Ford =

1930s British aero-engine

- Type: Liquid-cooled 4-cylinder in-line piston engine
- National origin: United Kingdom
- Manufacturer: Carden Aero Engines
- First run: 1935
- Major applications: Chilton D.W.1; BAC Drone
- Developed from: Ford 10 car engine
- Developed into: Carden-Ford S.P.1 (40 hp)

The Carden-Ford was a 1930s British aero-engine modified from a Ford motor car engine by Carden Aero Engines

The company saw a need for a cheap low-powered propulsion unit for ultralight aircraft and the engine was an adaptation of the well-proven and reliable Ford 10 Model C motor car engine. The engine was reversed, and a thrust bearing fitted to what was now the front of the engine. The chain drive was replaced by lightweight fibre gears, an Elektron aluminium alloy sump fitted, and dual ignition if requested. There were two cylinder head variants, one with an 'L' shape, the other with a low-profile flat head which required a separate header tank. This latter design was adapted for the elegant Chilton Aircraft Ltd Chilton D.W.1 Monoplane of 1936.

== Variants ==
Carden-Ford 31 hp 4-cylinder
A much modified Ford 10 car engine.
Carden-Ford S.P.1
Further development of the 31 hp engine, with a centric supercharger, 1.1:1 gear ratio, splined propeller shaft extension and horizontal mounting for flush wing mounting. Used exclusively on the Carden-Baynes Bee

== Application ==
- Broughton-Blayney Brawney
- B.A.C. Drone
- Chilton D.W.1 monoplane
- Carden-Baynes Bee
- Kronfeld Monoplane
- Mignet HM.14 (Flying Flea)
- Perman Parasol
- Taylor Watkinson Dingbat

== Engine specifications (Carden-Ford 31 hp 4-cylinder) ==
Data from British Piston Engines and their Aircraft

=== General characteristics ===
- Type: 4-cyl, upright, in-line,
- Bore: 63.5 mm
- Stroke: 92.5 mm
- Displacement: 1.17 l
- Designer: Sir John Carden
- Righthand rotation, direct-drive tractor, Poppet valve

=== Components ===
- Cooling system: Liquid
- Dual magnetos

=== Performance ===
- Power output: 31 hp
- Compression ratio: 6.6:1
