= L. E. Baynes =

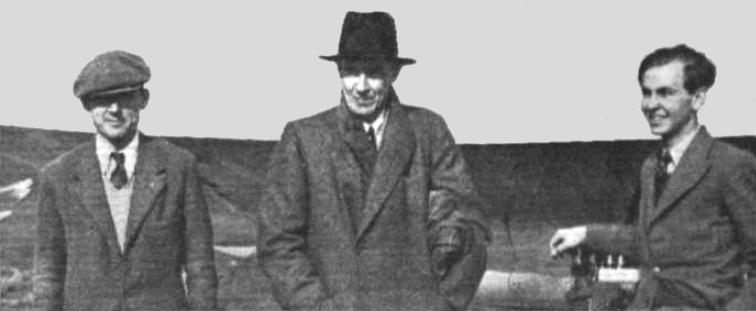
- At Heston Airport 3 October 1935; L. E. Baynes on left, Sir John Carden in centre, Stephen Appleby on right
- Born: 23 March 1902; Barnes, Surrey, England
- Died: 13 March 1989 (aged 86); Swanage, Dorset, England
- Occupation: aeronautical engineer

Leslie Everett Baynes (23 March 1902 – 13 March 1989) was an English aeronautical engineer.

== Early life ==
Born in Barnes, Surrey, on 23 March 1902 the son of James and Florence Baynes. Baynes was educated at Gresham's School, Norfolk, leaving school at the age of sixteen to join an aircraft company. He developed engineering skills at school and in industry.

== Career ==
After leaving school, Baynes started work in the fledgling aircraft industry with Airco (The Aircraft Manufacturing Company) at Hendon Aerodrome. From there, he moved on to Short Brothers at Rochester, where he redesigned the Short Singapore flying boat.

In 1930, Baynes designed the Scud light sailplane, built at first by Brant Aircraft Limited at Croydon. The Scud was successful, and in 1931, Baynes went into partnership with E.D. Abbott as Abbott-Baynes Sailplanes Ltd, of Farnham, Surrey, to build Scud 1 sailplanes, and later the Scud 2 (1932). In 1935, a Scud II flown by Mungo Buxton took the British Height Record for a glider to 8,750 feet (2,666 m).

In 1935, Sir John Carden, an authority on tank design who was interested in gliding, outlined to Baynes his requirements for a self-launching sailplane. Baynes designed the Scud III sailplane, built by Abbott-Baynes Sailplanes, which when fitted with an engine was called the Carden-Baynes Auxiliary. That carried a retractable 249 cc Villiers engine mounted on top of the fuselage. The engine drove a pusher-propeller and produced 9 bhp, and the capacity of the fuel tank was enough to run the engine for thirty minutes. The 249 cc Auxiliary is believed to be the lowest-powered aircraft in the history of powered flight.

Also in 1935, the Mignet HM.14 Pou du Ciel "Flying Flea" built and flown by Stephen Appleby, was rebuilt by Abbott-Baynes Sailplanes, incorporating modifications designed by Baynes, who had witnessed its forced landing at Heston Aerodrome. The success of the Flying Flea family of homebuilt aircraft arose from an English translation of Mignet's book, The Flying Flea (1935), showing readers how to build their own aircraft at home. Abbott-Baynes Sailplanes Ltd went into limited production of a developed version named the Baynes Cantilever Pou.

Following the death of John Carden in December 1935, in April 1936, Baynes set up Carden-Baynes Aircraft at Heston Aerodrome, and designed the Carden-Baynes Bee, a two-seat wooden aircraft with two Carden-Ford engines in pusher configuration.

During the Second World War, Baynes was the aviation adviser to Alan Muntz & Co at Heston Aerodrome, specialists in weapons systems, and he organised an aircraft division of the company. In 1941, he put up a proposal for a detachable wing with a 100-foot wingspan which when attached to a tank would turn it into a glider. This concept was developed as far as the Baynes Bat prototype, with most of the test flights being piloted by Flight Lieutenant Robert Kronfeld.

Baynes also worked on designs for long-range bombers, and the V-22 Osprey was an American aircraft very similar to a bomber design submitted to the British government by Baynes during the Second World War.

After the war, in the 1940s and 1950s, Baynes was busy with research in the area of variable-sweep supersonic aircraft. In 1949 he applied for a patent on his design for a supersonic variable-sweep wing and tail fighter. The design was built and wind tunnel test were completed successfully. However, due to budget constraints at the time, the design failed to receive government backing and was later developed in the US.

He also designed interiors for airliners, invented the vertical lift plane and the high-speed hydrofoil.

L. E. Baynes designed the Youngman-Baynes High Lift Research Aircraft, an experimental flying test-bed for the system of slotted flaps invented by R.T. Youngman. It used components from the Percival Proctor, and was built by Heston Aircraft Company Ltd. Test pilot Flight Lieutenant Ralph S Munday piloted the first flight at Heston Aerodrome on 5 February 1948, carrying the military serial VT789.

A Scud II built in 1935 is still airworthy, and is believed to be the oldest flying glider in the United Kingdom.

== Later life ==
Baynes died at Swanage near Poole, Dorset, on 13 March 1989.

== Chronology ==
- 1919 patented first automatic variable pitch airscrew,
- 1924–1927 responsible for aerodynamic design of Short Singapore Flying-Boat
- 1929–1930 Designed and manufactured first all-British glider to soar, the Scud I
- 1933–1935 Scud II sailplanes; British height record holder and international event winner
- 1935 Designed and built Scud III; first retractable-motored sailplane
- 1937 Designed Carden-Baynes Bee, first twin-engined pusher monoplane with wing-buried engines
- 1939 Project-designed gas turbine system 100 passenger long-range aircraft
- 1938 Designed and patented first V/TOL swivel turbine 'Heliplane'
- 1939–1945 Designed and built for Ministry of Supply (MoS) experimental tail-less flying wing, Baynes Bat, for tank-carrying project initiated by Winston Churchill; Designed and implemented conversion of Douglas Boston medium bombers to Turbinlite searchlight aircraft, submarine guided missiles and other weapons and equipment for the RAF
- 1946–1948 Designed and built for M.O.S., Youngman-Baynes High-Lift Research Aircraft
- 1949 Designed and patented the first variable-sweep fighter aircraft for supersonic flight (swing-wing fighter)
- 1950–1962 Designed and manufactured airliner equipment for major aircraft companies and airlines
- 1963–1964 Designed and patented first high-speed hydrofoil sea craft (made secret by the ministry)

== Bibliography ==
- Appleby, Stephen. On Home-made Wings. Aeroplane Monthly. March 1982
- Ellis, Ken; Jones, Geoff. 1990. Henri Mignet and his Flying Fleas. Haynes Publishing ISBN 0-85429-765-0
- Jackson, A.J. (1974). British Civil Aircraft since 1919 Volume 1. Putnam. ISBN 0-370-10006-9
- Meaden, Jack (Autumn 2007). ''The Heston Aircraft Company Part 7: The Youngman-Baynes Flap, Air-Britain Archive (journal), p. 2007/111.
- Meaden, Jack (Winter 2007). The Heston Aircraft Company Part 8: The Scud Gliders, Air-Britain Archive (journal), p. 2007/151.
- Meaden, Jack (Spring 2008). The Heston Aircraft Company Part 9: The Baynes Bee, Air-Britain Archive (journal), p. 2008/009.
- Mignet, Henri (1934) Le Sport de l'Air (in French, 661 pages)
- Mignet, Henri; ed: Chamier, John (1935) The Flying Flea: How to Build and Fly It. The Air League (English adaptation of Le Sport de l'Air)
- Morse, William. Baynes: The Unknown Innovator. Aeroplane Monthly, June 1992
- Smith, Geoffrey (1942) Gas Turbines and Jet Propulsion for Aircraft by Geoffrey Smith, 1942
