= 1935 SABENA Savoia-Marchetti S.73 crash =

Aviation incident in England

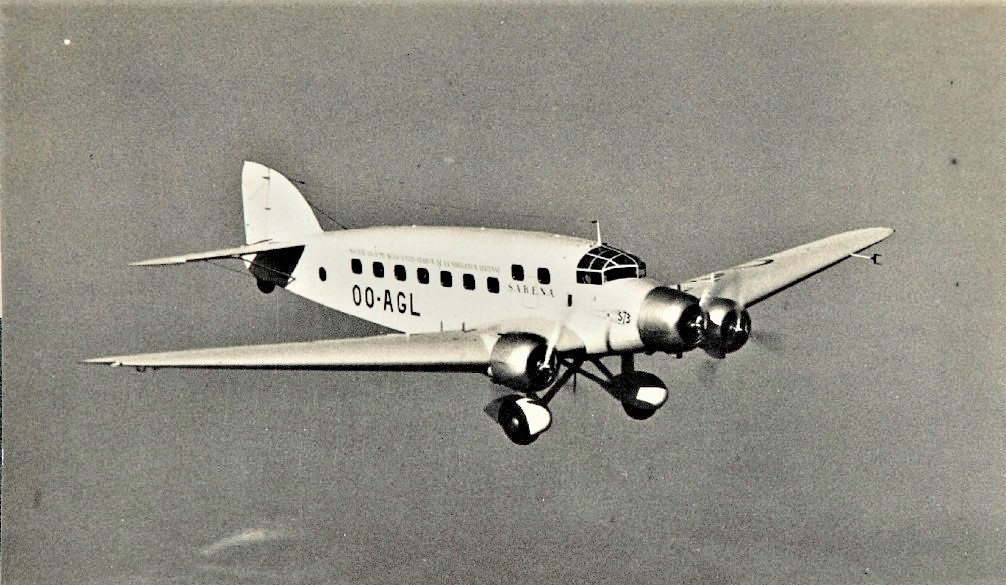
- A Sabena S.73 similar to the aircraft involved

Accident
- Date: 10 December 1935
- Summary: Pilot error
- Site: Tatsfield, Surrey, England; 51.3020°N 0.0305°E

Aircraft
- Aircraft type: Savoia-Marchetti S.73
- Operator: SABENA
- Registration: OO-AGN
- Flight origin: Brussels Airport, Belgium
- Destination: Croydon Airport, United Kingdom
- Passengers: 7
- Crew: 4
- Fatalities: 11
- Survivors: 0

The 1935 SABENA Savoia-Marchetti S.73 crash occurred on 10 December 1935 when Savoia-Marchetti S.73 OO-AGN of Belgian airline SABENA crashed at Tatsfield, Surrey, England, while on an international scheduled flight from Brussels Airport Haren, Belgium to Croydon Airport, United Kingdom. All eleven passengers and crew were killed.

== Aircraft ==
The accident aircraft was Savoia-Marchetti S.73 OO-AGN, c/n 30004. The aircraft had entered service on 6 May 1935.

== Accident ==
The aircraft was operating an international scheduled service from Haren Airport in Brussels to Croydon, the main airport of London. Between 16:30 and 17:00 GMT, the aircraft crashed into the large garden of a house Mosscroft, Kemsley Road, Tatsfield, close to its aerial beacon and north of the village towards Biggin Hill. The aircraft crashed into the north-sloping hillside at about 500 feet (150 m), 140 feet (43 m) below the top of the hill. Witnesses who heard the aircraft in flight stated that the engines were not running smoothly. Other aircraft flying that night had encountered icing of their wings.

All eleven people on board were killed in the accident. Police and ambulances from Biggin Hill, Oxted and Tatsfield attended. It was the early hours of 11 December before all the victims' bodies had been recovered. A number of sightseers looted portions of the wreckage for souvenirs, which was criticised by Major Cooper, the Air Ministry inspector in charge of the investigation into the accident. Evidence given at the inquest indicated that the aircraft had stalled, with the engines not at full power at the time of the accident. Carburettor icing was ruled out as a cause of the accident.

A temporary mortuary was set up in St Lawrence's Church, Caterham. Identification of all victims was by means of passports and other identity papers they were carrying. The inquest into the deaths of the victims opened in Caterham on 16 January 1936. Evidence was given that the pilot was experienced, having been employed by SABENA since 1927. No distress calls had been made by radio. Verdicts of "accidental death" were returned in all cases.

== Casualties ==
Among the casualties was British engineer and tank designer Sir John Carden, joint owner of aircraft manufacturer Carden-Baynes, and a director of Vickers-Armstrongs. Another victim was Eugène Samyn, 48-year-old, textile manufacturer, on a business trip to London.

Dutch middleweight boxing champion Florend Willems was scheduled to be on the flight. Instead, he decided to travel by boat. He was due to fight Jack Hyams in Stepney on 11 December.

Nationality	Crew	Passengers	Total
Belgian	4	1	5
English	–	6	6
Total	4	7	11

== Investigation ==
The final report into the accident concluded that pilot error was the main cause, with weather a contributory factor. The pilot had become lost and stalled while trying to execute a sharp climbing turn, possibly to avoid flying into the ground. When the aircraft stalled, the passengers would have been thrown forwards, which might have made recovery from the stall harder.
