= Kronfeld Monoplane =

Monoplane

General information
- Type: Ultralight aircraft
- National origin: United Kingdom
- Manufacturer: Kronfeld
- Designer: Robert Kronfeld
- Number built: 1

History
- First flight: 1937

The Kronfeld Monoplane was a 1930s British ultra-light aircraft designed by Robert Kronfeld, only one was built.

== Design and development ==
Designed as a successor to the company's Kronfeld Drone, the Monoplane was a single-seat parasol monoplane powered by a 30 hp (22 kW) Carden-Ford converted car engine. The Monoplane, registered G-AESG, was built and first flown at Hanworth Aerodrome in 1937. With the start of the Second World War a second unfinished Monoplane and the prototype were scrapped.

== Specifications ==
Data from British Civil Aircraft since 1919

General characteristics

- Crew: 1
- Length: 21 ft 2 in (6.45 m)
- Wingspan: 39 ft 8 in (12.09 m)
- Empty weight: 390 lb (177 kg)
- Gross weight: 640 lb (290 kg)
- Powerplant: 1 × Carden-Ford , 30 hp (22 kW)

Performance

- Maximum speed: 73 mph (117 km/h, 63 kn)

== See also ==
Related development

- Kronfeld Drone
