= Abbott-Baynes Scud 2 =

British single-seat glider, 1932

Scud 2
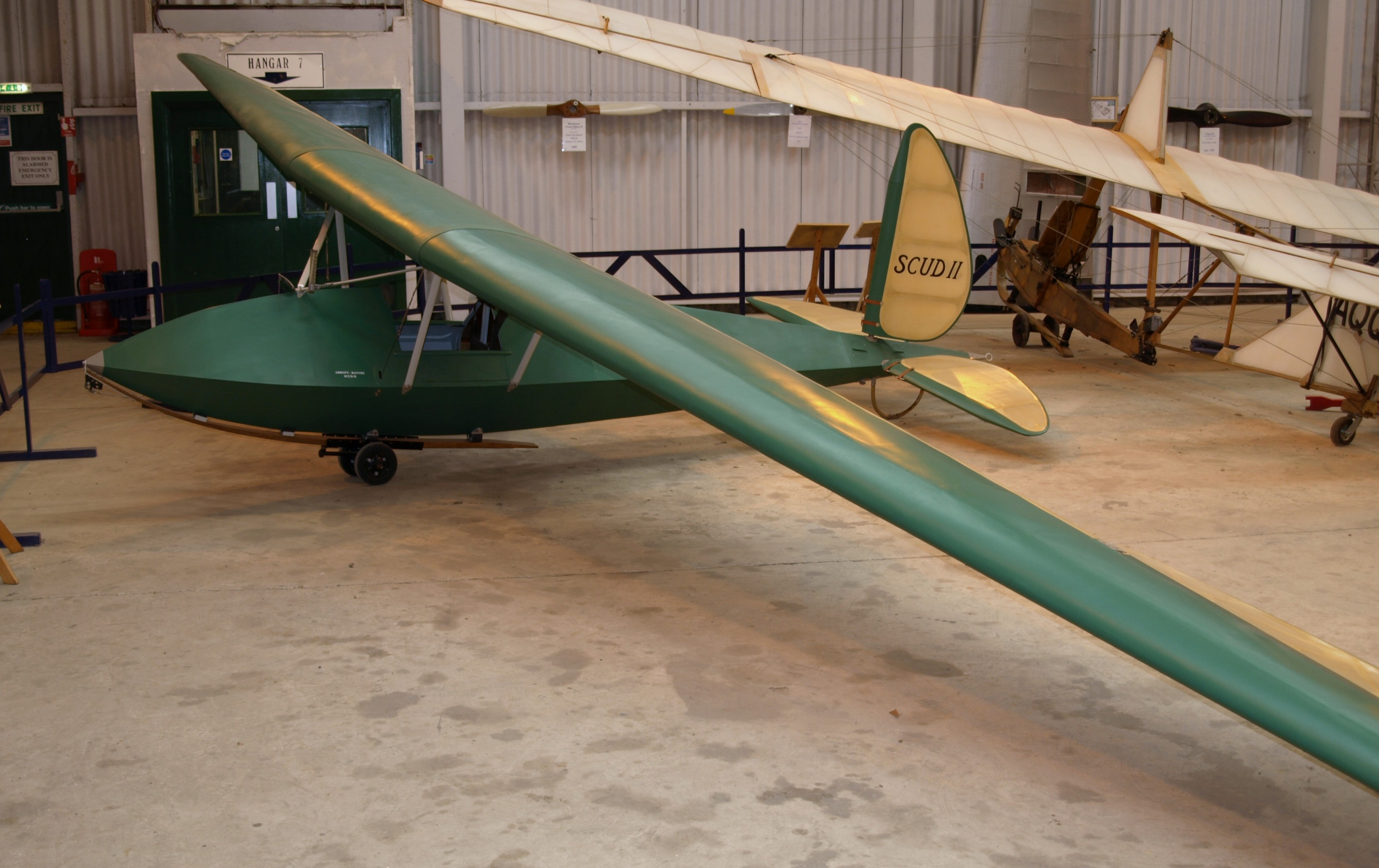
- Scud II on display at the Shuttleworth Collection.

General information
- Type: Single seat sailplane
- National origin: United Kingdom
- Manufacturer: Abbott-Baynes Sailplanes Ltd
- Designer: L. E. Baynes
- Status: 1 still flying
- Number built: at least 5

History
- First flight: 27 August 1932

The Abbott-Baynes Scud 2 was a 1930s high-performance sailplane, built in the UK. It was a development of the intermediate-level Scud 1 with a new, high aspect ratio wing.

== Design and development ==
The Scud 2 was a development of the single seat, parasol winged intermediate-level Abbott-Baynes Scud 1 glider flown a year earlier. The two aircraft were both designed by L. E. Baynes and had many common features but the Scud 2 has a wing of much higher aspect ratio, intended for serious rather than introductory soaring. The wing loading is 3.5 lb/ft^{2} (17.1 kg/m^{2}), similar to that of the Scud 1.

Like its predecessor, the Scud 2 is a wooden aircraft. Its parasol wing is of single spar construction, with straight, swept leading edges and unswept trailing edges outboard of a short parallel chord centre section. This wing has an aspect ratio of 16, more than twice that of the Scud 1. It carries outboard ailerons but there are no flaps or airbrakes. The wing is supported by two parallel pairs of thin lift struts from the mid-fuselage longerons to centre section mounting points.

The Scud 2, though 1.25 m longer and consequentially slimmer, has the same fuselage construction as the Scud 1 with four ash longerons orientated with one diagonal vertical. It was plywood skinned throughout, though with a break for the under-wing open cockpit. The upper longeron load is carried across the cockpit break via the wing structure by two pairs of struts, one well forward and one well aft of the cockpit, to the lift strut mounting points on the wing spars, together with a near vertical pair just behind the cockpit. The tail unit is similar to that of the Scud 1 with three identical and interchangeable surfaces acting as all-moving elevators and rudder. These have straight leading edges but smoothly rounded trailing edges, unlike the angular rear edges on the Scud 1. A landing skid extends from the nose to below the wing trailing edge, with a wire loop as a tail skid.

The Scud 2 first flew on 27 August 1932 from Askam-in-Furness. Photographs and general arrangement drawings from 1932 show early aircraft had narrow chord ailerons extending over the outer half-span and maintaining the straight wing trailing edge. Later drawings show shorter and broader surfaces with curved trailing edges protruding beyond that of the wing. Abbott-Baynes advertisements from mid-1933 also show this modification. The one surviving Scud 2, the Slingsby built G-ALOT, has these ailerons.

== Operational history ==
The number of Scud 2s built is uncertain, though Abbott-Baynes produced a total of 12 Scud 1 and Scud 2 in all. There were also attempts to build Scud 2s from kits or plans. At least 5 Scud 2 were built, including one completed by Slingsby Aviation. One was flown from Dunstable Downs with the London Gliding Club and another with the Ulster Gliding Club. These two met at the 1934 BGA competition, held at Sutton Bank. G. M. Buxton, who flew the prototype from Dunstable, set a British glider altitude record in 1935 at 8,750 ft (2.666 m). One Scud 2 went to the Orkney Islands and was on display in the gliding club club-house after World War II.

== Aircraft on display ==
3 Scud 2s remained on the UK civil aircraft register after World War II in 1949 but by 1950 only one, G-ALOT/BGA231, remained. After a long career at Dunstable this aircraft, the oldest glider on the BGA register, became part of the Shuttleworth Collection in December 2009. After restoration and a preliminary flight trial the following Spring it flew successfully on 4 September 2010.

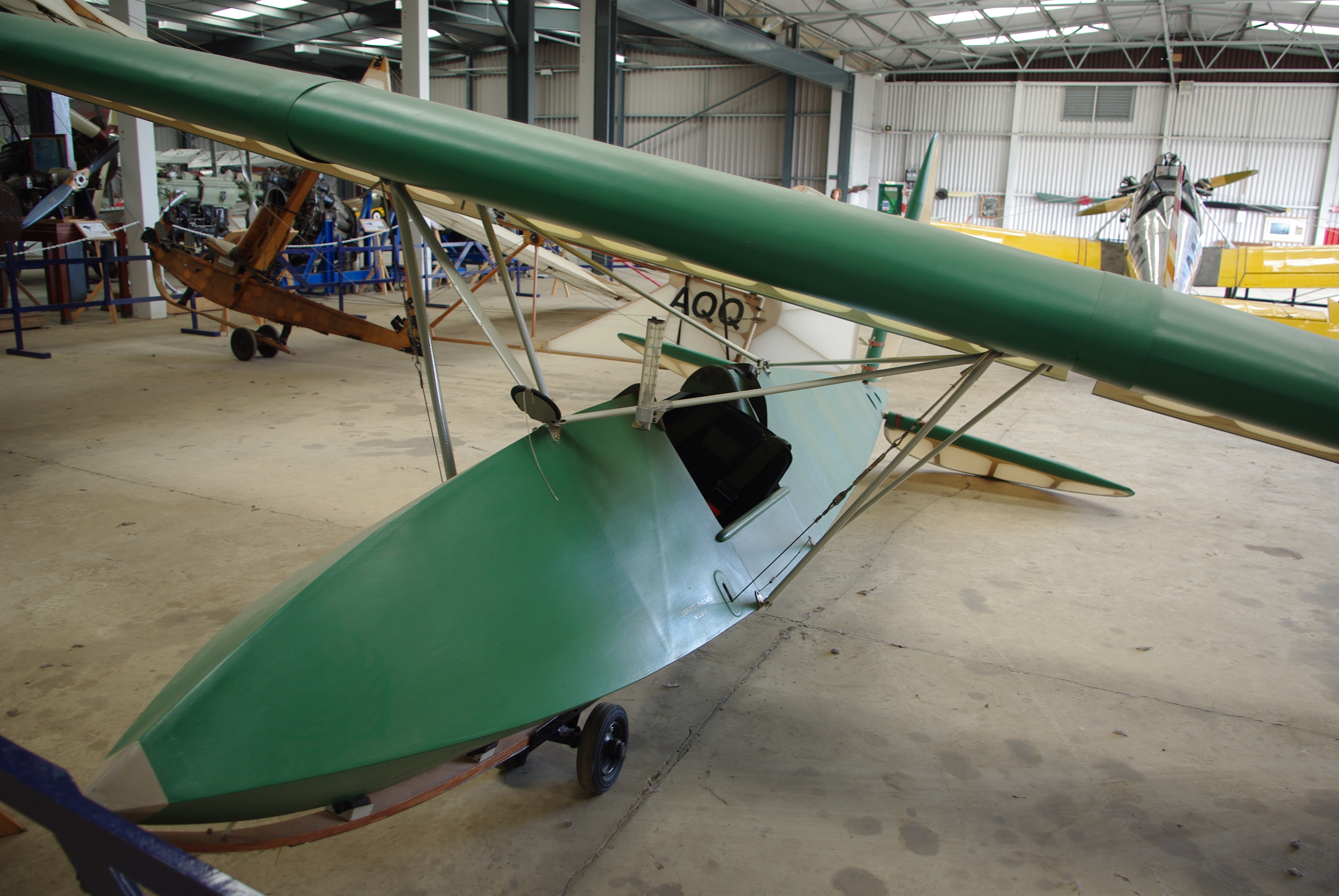
Scud II, Shuttleworth Collection

Another example is at the Gliding Heritage Centre.

== Specifications ==
Data from Ellison

General characteristics

- Crew: 1
- Length: 17 ft 5 in (5.31 m)
- Wingspan: 40 ft 0 in (12.19 m)
- Wing area: 100.0 sq ft (9.29 m^{2})
- Aspect ratio: 16
- Airfoil: Gŏttingen 652
- Empty weight: 150 lb (68 kg)
- Gross weight: 320 lb (145 kg)

Performance

- Never exceed speed: 70 mph (113 km/h, 61 kn)
- Rate of sink: 132 ft/min (0.67 m/s) minimum
- Lift-to-drag: 22
- Wing loading: 3.00 lb/sq ft (14.63 kg/m^{2})
