= Alan Muntz =

British consulting aeronautical engineer (1899–1985)

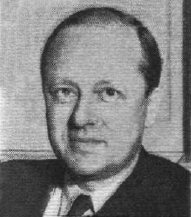
- Born: Frederick Alan Irving Muntz; 7 June 1899; Cheddleton, Staffordshire, England
- Died: 7 March 1985 (aged 85); Winchester, Hampshire, England
- Occupation: aeronautical engineer

Frederick Alan Irving Muntz BA FRAeS (7 June 1899 – 7 March 1985) was a British consulting aeronautical engineer.

== Early years ==
Alan Muntz was the son of Major Irving Muntz and Jessie Challoner. He was educated at Winchester College and Trinity College, Cambridge, gaining a BA in Mechanical Sciences. In 1918, during World War I, he served in France as a 2nd Lieutenant with the 432nd Field Company, Royal Engineers. In 1927, he learned to fly in an Avro 548 of the Henderson School of Flying at Brooklands aerodrome.

== Professional life ==
In 1928, Muntz co-founded Airwork Ltd with Nigel Norman. In 1929, the company opened Heston Aerodrome that was active in private, commercial and military aviation until its closure in 1947. In the same period, architect Graham Dawbarn joined the pair to form an airport consultancy firm called Norman, Muntz & Dawbarn In 1932, he co-founded Misr Airwork SAE, with Talaat Harb Pasha, Banque Misr, Cairo. In 1933, he helped R.E. Grant Govan to found Indian National Airways Ltd. In 1937, he founded Alan Muntz & Co. Ltd to develop the Pescara free-piston engine system and other inventions.

During World War II, Alan Muntz & Co was involved in many projects, including Turbinlite. Alan Muntz & Co, and its aircraft consultant L.E. Baynes, was responsible for the design and development of the Youngman-Baynes High Lift aircraft that first flew in 1948.

== Family life ==
In 1923, Alan Muntz married Mary Lee Harnett, daughters Scilla I. Muntz (born 1925) and Jasmine M.I. Muntz (born 1927), son Colin Lee Irving Muntz (23 March 1929 – 25 April 1953). In 1934, he married Lady Margaret Frances Anne Vane-Tempest-Stewart (1910–1966), daughter of Charles Stewart Henry Vane-Tempest-Stewart, 7th Marquess of Londonderry. In 1948, he married Marjorie Mary Helena Strickland.
