= British Aircraft Company =

British aircraft manufacturer

The British Aircraft Company was a British aircraft manufacturer based in Maidstone. It was founded by C H Lowe-Wylde and produced gliders and light aircraft during the 1930s.

B.A.C. Ltd was registered as a Limited Company on 4 March 1931; directors were C H Lowe-Wylde, K Barcham Green and Mrs Sheila M Green. Around this time Lowe-Wylde was developing the principle of launching gliders by towing them using a powerful car. Giving demonstrations around the country, his Bentley, driven by Mrs Green, was able to launch him to a height of 300 ft, thus making hill sites and bungy-launch teams unnecessary. A public demonstration of this on the Brooklands Race Track's Finishing Straight on 9 April 1931 was filmed by British Pathe and almost ended in disaster when Lowe-Wylde clipped the port wing as he made an impressive landing under a footbridge. A school of auto-towed instruction was started at West Malling. The Sopwith Dove G-EBKY (now with the Shuttleworth Collection) was also used for aero-towing.

== Glider production ==
Charles H Lowe-Wylde was the first person in Britain to earn the F.A.I. "A" gliding certificate, on 30 March 1930, flying a primary glider of his own design, built in five weeks by members of the Kent Gliding Club and named "Columbus". The glider was first flown at Detling on 23 February 1930. Lowe-Wylde set up the British Aircraft Company in mid-1930, with works in an old brewery at Lower Stone Street, Maidstone.

B.A.C. I

The first true B.A.C. aircraft was another primary, the B.A.C. I, again used by the Kent Gliding Club.

B.A.C. II

The B.A.C. II was also a primary, but instead of an open girder-type frame, it had a box spar fuselage. This first flew at Lenham on 21 September 1930 and about fifteen were sold, including one in Jamaica. Lowe-Wylde would deliver the gliders personally and demonstrate them at the club's site (and if necessary take the pieces home for repair the same day).

B.A.C. III

The B.A.C. III consisted of the wings and tail from the B.A.C. II combined with a fuselage enclosing the pilot. First flying at Lenham on 12 October 1930, two went to the Glasgow and Accrington gliding clubs, while three further clubs had their B.A.C. II primaries delivered along with alternative B.A.C. III fuselages, so they could be flown in either configuration.

B.A.C. IV

An improved version of the B.A.C. III appearing in April 1931 was the B.A.C. IV with longer, tapered wings. One was sold to Mr C M C Turner of the Channel Gliding Club. For an intended channel crossing. it was towed to 10,000 ft by Sqn Ldr Probyn in his Westland Widgeon G-EBRQ on 18 June 1931, but this was not high enough for the planned flight.

B.A.C. V

The B.A.C. V was simply a B.A.C. III equipped with a pair of wheels for auto-towing. One was built for the Border Gliding Club, while the Preston & District club converted their B.A.C. III for towing off the beach at Middleton Sands, Heysham. However this aircraft crashed there fatally on 15 May 1932.

B.A.C. VI

When the B.A.C. IV was fitted with wheels, it was known as the B.A.C. VI. One was soared by Wolf Hirth at Balsdean on 1 April 1931 for 2hrs 13min. The Taunton & West Somerset Gliding Club was presented with a B.A.C. VI by their president, Lt. Col. Hamilton Gault, M.P., which was first demonstrated for the club by Mr Lowe-Wylde on 9 July 1931.

B.A.C. VII

On 12 April 1931 the first two-seat B.A.C. VII flew, still using the 40 ft 10in span wings of the B.A.C. IV and VI, but with a new fuselage and an aircraft-type twin-wheel undercarriage for aero- or auto-towing. A B.A.C. VII sponsored by novelist Barbara Cartland was intended to compete for the Daily Mail cross-channel competition prize, but in trials, flown by Edward Mole and towed by DH.60 Moth G-AAPA of National Flying Services, the combination was unable to get above 6,000 ft, insufficient height for a crossing, so instead a towed flight was made from Maidstone to Reading on 20 June 1931. (Robert Kronfeld made a successful channel crossing the same day.)

The RAF Pageant held at Hendon on 25 June 1932 included a display by three B.A.C. VII gliders. At the British Gliding Association meeting at Huish/Pewsey Hill, G E Collins – the BGA instructor, made the first thermal-soaring flights in the UK, with a cross-country flight of 6 miles in a B.A.C. VII on 3 July 1933. Some B.A.C. VIIs were sold as kits, including one built in Palestine, and a replica was built by Michael Maufe in the 1980s, using the wings from a Drone.

B.A.C. VIII

The B.A.C. VIII was a two-seat flying boat glider using B.A.C. VII wings and tail. Nicknamed the "Bat-Boat" after similar craft described in a short story by Rudyard Kipling, it was tested in August 1931 by being towed behind a speed-boat on the River Medway at Rochester. On 7 December that year it was demonstrated from the Welsh Harp reservoir at Hendon.

B.A.C. XI

The last of Lowe-Wylde's glider designs was the B.A.C. IX, a lightweight sailplane designed for possible home building. One only was built, first flown at Balsdean on 4 Oct 1931. The Kent Gliding Club were hoping to acquire it in 1933, but nothing more is known.

== Powered aircraft ==
Planette

In Autumn 1932 the four B.A.C. Planettes appeared; these were conversions of B.A.C. VIIs fitted with a 600cc Douglas engine driving a pusher propeller. The first two were demonstrated at London Air Park on 27 November 1932. In 1932 the prototype Percival Gull, G-ABUR, was built in the B.A.C. works at Maidstone.

On 13 May 1933 Lowe-Wylde was killed in an accident while flying a Planette at Maidstone Airport.

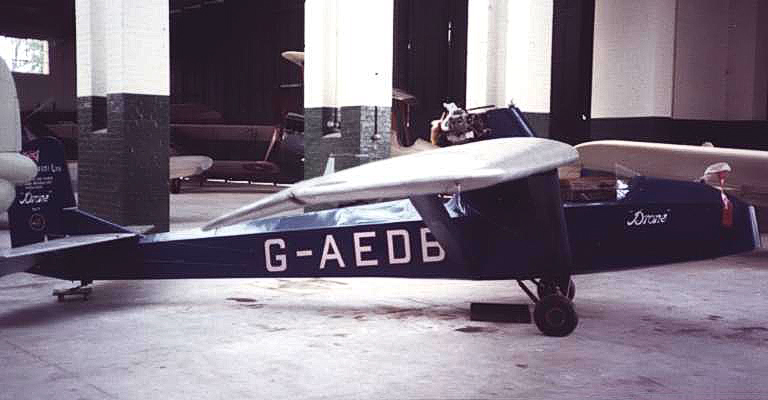
A Super Drone

British Aircraft Company Drone

Robert Kronfeld took over the company and started modifying the surviving Planettes to produce a more practical single-seat light aeroplane known as the B.A.C. Drone. The firm moved to a new factory at London Air Park (Hanworth), and became the British Aircraft Company (1935) Ltd. The Drone went into quantity production in 1935. On 21 May 1936 the company was renamed as Kronfeld Ltd. The Drone was also built under licence at Issy les Moulineaux in France by the Societe Francaise des Avions Nouvelles (SFAN), and at Ghent in Belgium by the Societe Gantoise des Avions sans Moteur.
