= Chilton D.W.1 =

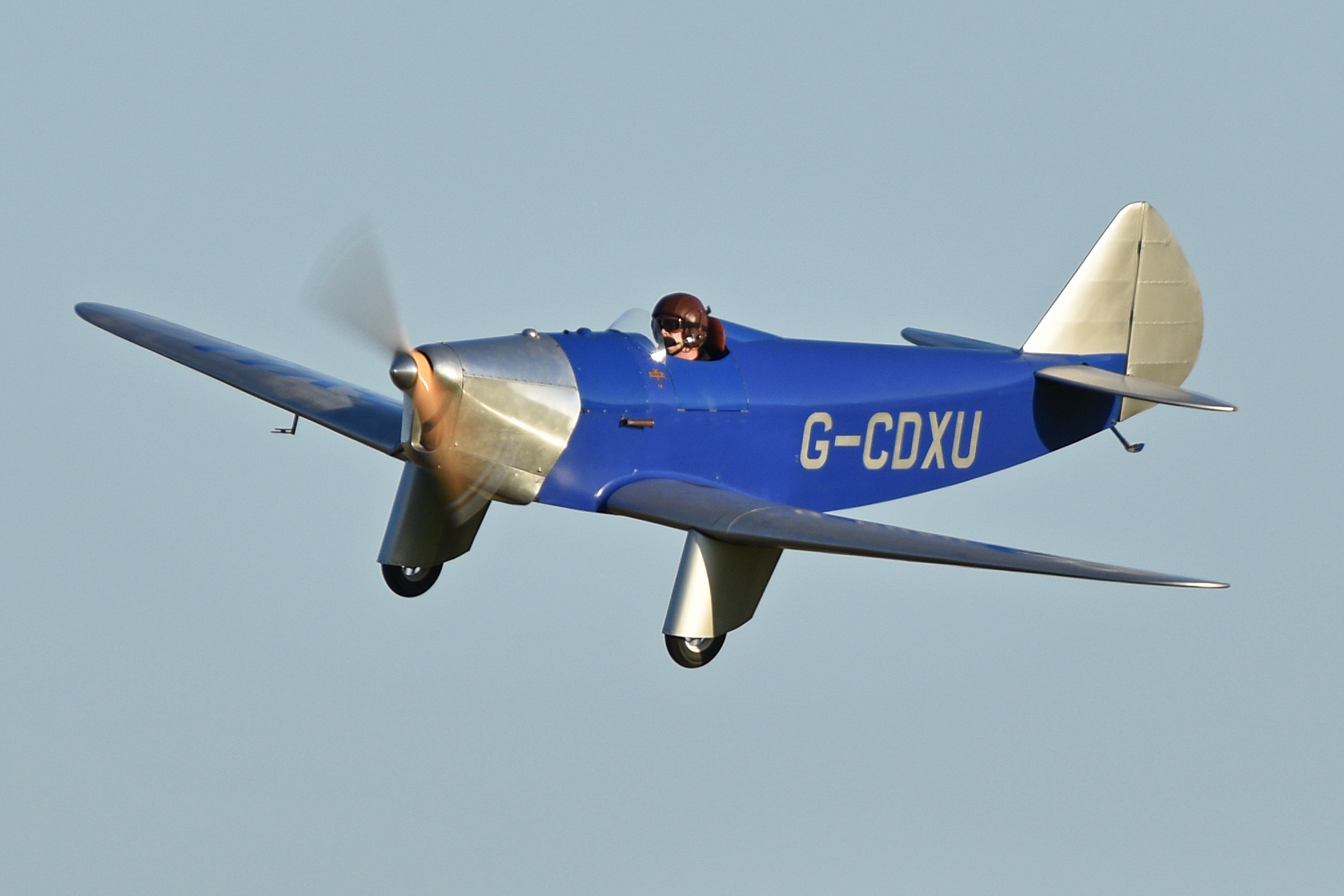
- This Chilton D.W.1A replica is part of the Shuttleworth Collection in England

General information
- Type: Light sporting monoplane
- National origin: United Kingdom
- Manufacturer: Chilton Aircraft Limited
- Designer: Andrew Dalrymple and A.R.Ward
- Status: two flying in 2005
- Primary user: private owners
- Number built: 4 prewar, plus 3 under amateur construction postwar

History
- Introduction date: 1937
- First flight: April 1937

The Chilton D.W.1 is a British light sporting monoplane designed and built in the late 1930s by Chilton Aircraft at Hungerford, Berkshire.

== Design and development ==
The Chilton D.W.1 was designed and built on the Chilton Lodge estate at Leverton near Hungerford in Berkshire in early 1937 by two ex de Havilland Technical School students who formed Chilton Aircraft Limited for the purpose. The aircraft was intended to be cheap to build and operate, yet have an exceptional performance on low power. This was derived from its aerodynamically clean design with an all-wood airframe with plywood skin. Only the control surfaces and the trailing edge of the wing behind the rear spar were fabric covered. The wing also carried trailing edge split flaps. The undercarriage was enclosed in trouser fairings and a cabin top could be fitted.

== Prewar history ==
The first three aircraft were powered by the 32 h.p. Carden-Ford, a water-cooled automobile engine that had been lightened and modified for aircraft use. Initial flight trials with the prototype G-AESZ were made by Ranald Porteous at Witney airfield in April 1937, revealing that some minor modifications were needed to the engine and propeller. The first public appearance was made at Southend Airport on 4 September 1937. The second and third aircraft were completed and sold in 1938. The final aircraft was completed in July 1939 and was powered by the new French-built 44 h.p. Train 4T four-cylinder inverted inline air-cooled engine. This aircraft (G-AFSV) was designated the D.W.1A, and the Hon. A.W.H. Dalrymple flew it in the Folkestone Aero Trophy Race at Lympne on 5 August 1939, winning at an average speed of 126 mph.

== Postwar history ==
All four Chiltons survived the Second World War. The D.W.1A G-AFSV broke the 100 km international closed circuit record at 124.5 mph at Lympne airfield on 31 August 1947, flown by Ranald Porteus. The last three Chiltons were flown in U.K. air races for several years. The cleaned-up third aircraft won the Daily Express air race at Shoreham Airport on 22 September 1951 at an average speed of 129 mph.

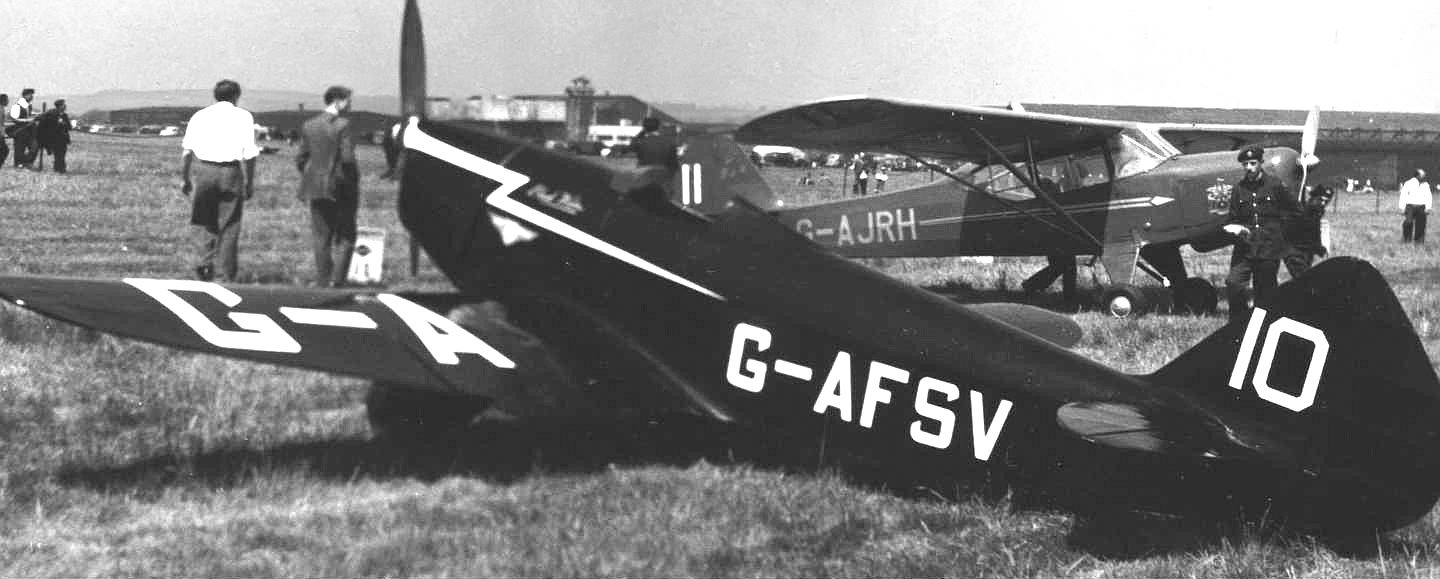
The 1939-built Chilton D.W.1A at Leeds (Yeadon) Airport in May 1955 during the national air races

== Postwar amateur construction ==
The first home constructed post-war Chilton was the Canadian C-GIST, built during 1980–91 and powered by a Volkswagen engine. It is currently in the UK, non-flying but with plans for a rebuild with a Walter Mikron. The first UK build was G-BWGJ, powered by the 55 hp Lycoming O-145 engine from the prewar G-AFGH. It flew but has been in store for several years. The Mikron powered G-CDXU has been flying again since 2009. A second Mikron powered DW1A Chilton, G-JUJU 'Black Magic' flew for the first time in July 2015 and is maintained in airworthy condition.

== Survivors ==
Two prewar Chiltons survived in airworthy condition in 2005 and the other two were restoration projects at that date. The British CAA register in May 2011 showed G-AESZ, G-AFGI and G-CDXU with permits to fly. The first of these has the Carden-Ford engine and the others are powered by Walter Mikrons. In May 2020, of those 3 aircraft, only G-AFGI has a permit. However, both G-JUJU and G-DWCB are currently in permit airworthy as well.

== Specifications (D.W.1 with Carden-Ford engine) ==
Data from British civil aircraft, 1919-1972 Volume I

General characteristics

- Crew: 1
- Length: 17 ft 6 in (5.33 m)
- Wingspan: 24 ft (7.3 m)
- Height: 4 ft 10 in (1.47 m)
- Wing area: 77 sq ft (7.2 m^{2})
- Empty weight: 398 lb (181 kg)
- Gross weight: 640 lb (290 kg)
- Max takeoff weight: 700 lb (318 kg)
- Fuel capacity: 8 imp gal (9.6 US gal; 36 L)
- Powerplant: 1 × Carden-Ford 4-cylinder water-cooled in-line piston engine, 31 hp (23 kW)

- Alternative engines:

- 55 hp (41 kW) Lycoming O-145-A / Lycoming O-145-2
- 45 hp (34 kW) Train 4T (Chilton DW.1A)

- Propellers: 2-bladed fixed-pitch propeller

Performance

- Maximum speed: 112 mph (180 km/h, 97 kn)
- Cruise speed: 100–103 mph (161–166 km/h, 87–90 kn)
- Landing speed: 35 mph (56 km/h)
- Range: 500 mi (800 km, 430 nmi)
- Rate of climb: 650 ft/min (3.3 m/s)
- Wing loading: 8.2 lb/sq ft (40 kg/m^{2})
- Power/mass: 0.05 hp/lb (0.082 kW/kg)
- Take-off run: 240 ft (73 m)
- Landing run: 150 ft (46 m)
