= British Aircraft Company Drone =

Drone
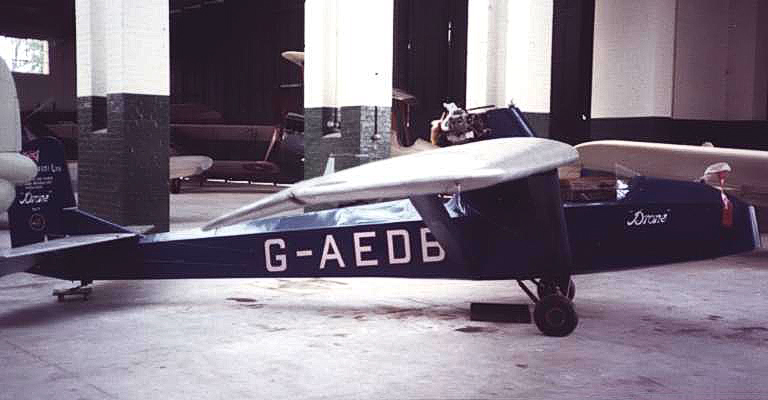
- 1936-built BAC Super Drone G-AEDB at Duxford Aerodrome in April 1982

General information
- Type: Ultralight aircraft
- National origin: United Kingdom
- Manufacturer: British Aircraft Company
- Designer: C.H Lowe Wylde
- Number built: 33

History
- First flight: 1932

The B.A.C. Drone was a British ultralight single-seat aircraft of the 1930s.

== Design ==
During the early 1930s, the British Aircraft Company of Maidstone, Kent built a series of gliders culminating in the B.A.C. VII tandem two-seater. In 1932 the firm fitted a 600 c.c. Douglas motorcycle engine above the high wing on a steel tube pylon. It flew as a single-seater, and was known as the B.A.C. Planette. On 13 May 1933, the talented 32-year old designer C.H. Lowe-Wylde was killed in a crash of the first Planette at West Malling. The firm was then taken over by Robert Kronfeld who modified the second Planette with a streamlined pylon, and renamed the design the Drone. In 1937, B.A.C. also introduced a machine called the Flying Ground Trainer. This was a powered primary glider which could be assembled either with a stub wing or with a Drone wing. It would fly only with the latter and was fitted with extra wheels at the nose and wing tips in order to ameliorate the consequences of inexperienced piloting.

== Production ==
Premises nearer London were acquired in 1935 at London Air Park, Hanworth, in Middlesex, and production of the single-seat aircraft commenced there. In 1936, the company was renamed Kronfeld Ltd, and 20 Drones were built during the year. Aircraft fitted with the 23 hp (17 kW) Douglas Sprite engine became known as the Kronfeld Super Drone. A version with a 30 hp (22 kW) water-cooled Carden-Ford converted car engine and folding wings was known as the Drone de Luxe. The firm closed down in 1937, after 33 Drones had been completed.

The Drone became popular with private owners. Col. the Master of Sempill startled the aviation world in April 1936, when he flew Drone G-ADPJ from Croydon Airport to Berlin in 11 hours flying time on 14 gallons of petrol. The return took him nine hours. Two Drones flew over 40,000 miles with C.W.A. Scott's air display team. During the Second World War, a camouflaged Drone de Luxe was unofficially flown by pilots of No. 609 Squadron on duck-shooting sorties using a 12-bore shot gun and a ring-and-bead sight.

== Surviving aircraft ==
Eight Drones survived the Second World War, and three of those flew again. Three Drones remained extant in 2006, including the sole surviving Kronfeld Drone de Luxe, G-AEKV, which last flew in 1984 and is now owned by Brooklands Museum in Surrey. and currently loaned to the Gliding Heritage Centre at Lasham, Hants.

== Specifications (Super Drone) ==
Data from British civil aircraft, 1919-1972 Volume I

General characteristics

- Crew: 1
- Length: 21 ft 2 in (6.45 m)
- Wingspan: 39 ft 8 in (12.09 m)
- Height: 7 ft 0 in (2.13 m)
- Wing area: 172 sq ft (16.0 m^{2})
- Empty weight: 390 lb (177 kg)
- Gross weight: 640 lb (290 kg)
- Powerplant: 1 × Douglas Sprite 2-cylinder air-cooled horizontally-opposed piston engine, 23 hp (17 kW)
- Propellers: 2-bladed fixed-pitch pusher propeller

Performance

- Maximum speed: 70 mph (110 km/h, 61 kn)
- Cruise speed: 60 mph (97 km/h, 52 kn)
- Range: 300 mi (480 km, 260 nmi)
- Service ceiling: 12,500 ft (3,800 m)
- Rate of climb: 380 ft/min (1.9 m/s)
- Wing loading: 2.67 lb/sq ft (13.0 kg/m^{2})
- Power/mass: 0.059 hp/lb (0.097 kW/kg)

== See also ==
Related development

- Kronfeld Monoplane

Aircraft of comparable role, configuration, and era

- Curtiss-Wright Junior
