= Carden-Baynes Bee =

General information
- Type: Two-seat touring aircraft
- National origin: United Kingdom
- Manufacturer: Carden-Baynes
- Designer: Leslie Baynes
- Number built: 1

History
- First flight: 3 April 1937

The Carden-Baynes Bee was a 1930s British two-seat aircraft, with twin engines in pusher configuration buried in the wings. The wings rotated for storage. Financial problems limited the Bee to a single flight.

== Design and development ==
Carden Aero Engines was established by Sir John Carden to produce aircraft engines from modified Ford car engines, these becoming known as Carden-Fords. He had collaborated with the aircraft designer Leslie Baynes on the Carden-Baynes Auxiliary, a motor-assisted version of the Abbott-Baynes Scud 3 designed earlier by Baynes, which flew in the summer of 1935. In December 1935, Carden was killed in an airliner crash, but in April 1936 Baynes went on to set up Carden-Baynes Aircraft Ltd. Its first product, the Bee, was to exploit a patent applied for by Baynes in December 1933, and granted in June 1935, for a pusher aircraft with a wing that rotated rather than folded for storage. It was to use a pair of supercharged Carden-Ford engines specially configured for the Bee so that they would operate on their sides, within the wing.

A few other aircraft had already used a rotating wing, for example the Koolhoven FK.30 of 1927, which was a single-engined pod and boom pusher and the Guldentops monoplane of 1934. The Bee was also unusual in putting together what Flight called "Twin-engined security, pusher airscrews, ample performance and vision, and non-acrobatic entry...", though in the end these qualities were not tested.

The cantilever wing of the Bee was of novel construction, built around a wide box formed from four spanwise spruce members connected with ply, constant in chord but tapering in thickness. Aerofoil shaped ribs were then slipped around the box and fabric covered. The wings had almost constant chord, tapering in plan only slightly and carrying long ailerons. A 40 hp (30 kW) four-cylinder water-cooled Carden-Ford engine lay buried in each wing immediately behind the box spar, driving a small two-bladed propeller via a gearbox, which increased the output speed by 10%, and a shaft to the trailing edge. These shafts were horizontal in flight, and so emerged above the wing surface on the way rearwards, contained in a shallow cowling. Radiators were mounted inside the wing, next to the engine, the cooling air ducted from under the front of the wing and exited via slots in the rear of the cowling. Fuel was stored in leading-edge tanks.

The wing was fixed to the fuselage at three points. There was a pivot at the centre of a pair of turntable rings, one on the fuselage, and one on the wing underside and just under 3 ft (890 mm) in diameter, plus two L-shaped locking bolts. Before the wings could be rotated, the flat-topped decking on the rear fuselage had to be swung out on hinges to hang down along the fuselage sides, then with these bolts removed, the wing could be swung through almost 90° so that one trailing edge, with its aileron raised vertically, lay close to the fin. The resulting storage planform was narrower than that of a typical folding aircraft, but longer. The aim of the rotating wing was not so much to save space as to make folding a one-man, rather than a two-man task.

Decking apart, the fuselage was a conventional spruce and plywood rectangular box structure, though wide at 42 in (1.066 m) even for a side-by-side seater. External longitudinal stiffeners ran along the sides. Access to the cabin was easy, with saloon car-type doors on either side and there was generous (10 cu ft or 0.92 m^{3}) luggage space behind the seats. Most flight controls were gathered on a central console, so that with double rudder bars and a T-shaped control column, the Bee could be flown from either seat. The cabin was glazed with Rhodoid (cellulose acetate). The main undercarriage wheels were in line with the wing leading edge, but largely within the fuselage, with only about 60% of the diameter showing below. Their shock-absorbing legs were also inside the fuselage. This arrangement had been used on very small aircraft such as the English Electric Wren, but it meant the Bee had a narrow undercarriage track despite some toe-out. At the rear, the fuselage extended below the rudder for ease of handling. The tailplane and tabbed elevators were on the top of the fuselage proper, so the elevators were split to allow rudder movement. Control surfaces were not balanced.

== Operational history ==
The Bee, registered G-AEWC, first flew on 3 April 1937 at Heston Aerodrome, piloted by Hubert Broad. Engine cooling problems required a forced landing, and there were immediate comments on its sluggish handling in the air and on its cross-wind taxying problems due to the narrow track undercarriage. This was the Bee's only flight; before there was time to improve the cooling and handling, financial problems forced Carden-Baynes into Receivership in June 1937, and all development stopped. In November 1937, it was reported that production was on hold, until British engines became available. The Bee, its plans, and Carden-Baynes' design for a bigger aircraft were bought by the newly formed Scottish Aircraft Construction Co., but no more was heard of any of them apart from an uncertain report that the Bee was scrapped at Heston in 1939.

== Specifications ==
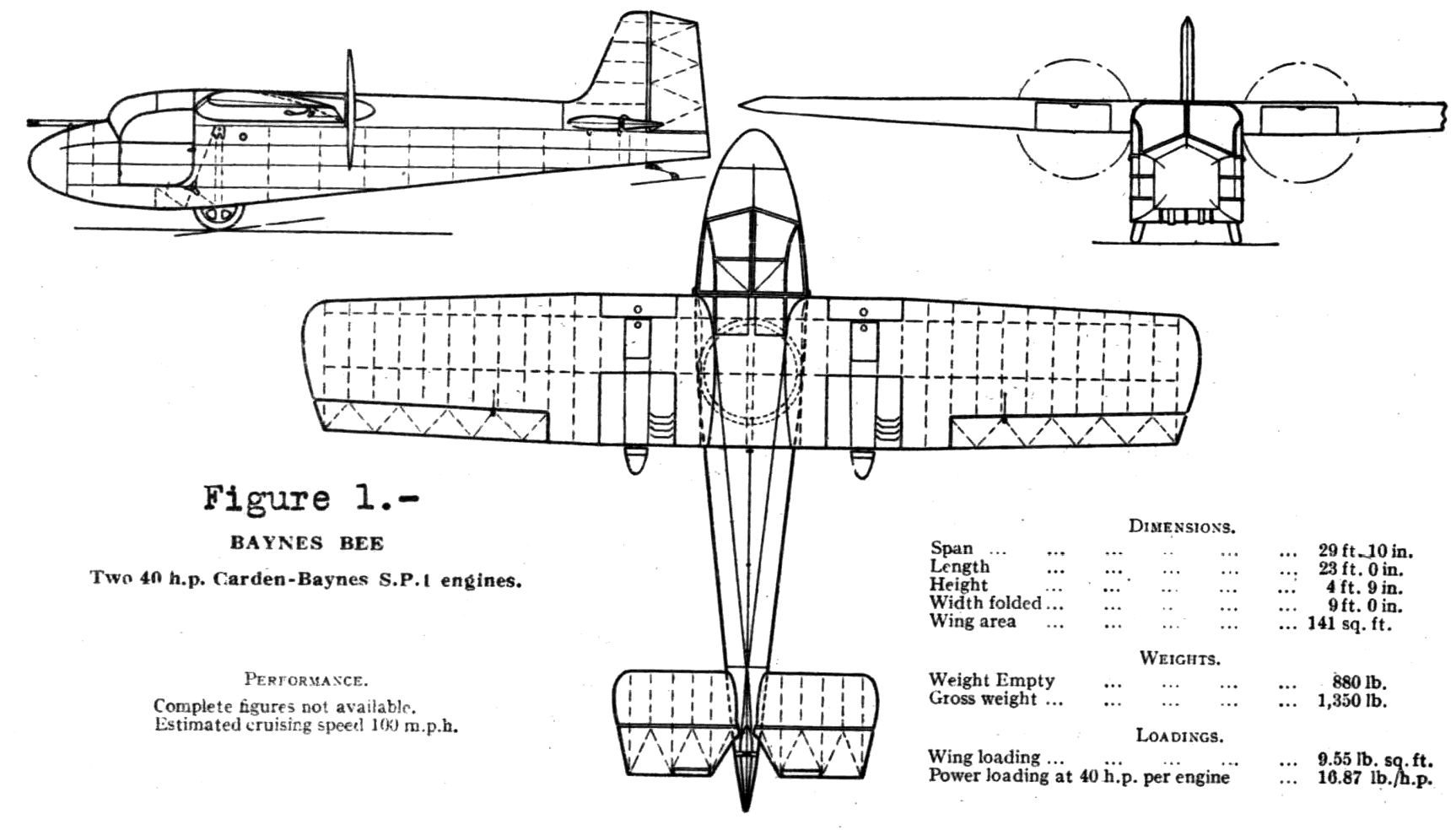
Carden-Baynes Bee 3-view drawing from NACA-AC-207

Data from Ord-Hume 2000, pp. 291, Ellison (1971), p.76

General characteristics

- Crew: 2
- Length: 23 ft 0 in (7.01 m)
- Wingspan: 29 ft 10 in (9.09 m)
- Wing area: 141 sq ft (13.1 m^{2})
- Empty weight: 880 lb (399 kg)
- Gross weight: 1,350 lb (612 kg)
- Powerplant: 2 × Carden-Ford S.P.1 4-cylinder horizontal water-cooled supercharged, geared up by 1.1:1, 40 hp (30 kW) each

Performance

- Maximum speed: 110 mph (180 km/h, 96 kn) estimated
- Cruise speed: 100 mph (160 km/h, 87 kn) estimated
- Stall speed: 40 mph (64 km/h, 35 kn)
- Range: 300 mi (480 km, 260 nmi) estimated
- Endurance: 3 hours
- Rate of climb: 699 ft/min (3.55 m/s)
- Wing loading: 9.55 lb/sq ft (46.62 kg/m^{2})
