= Mignet HM.14 =

Type of aircraft

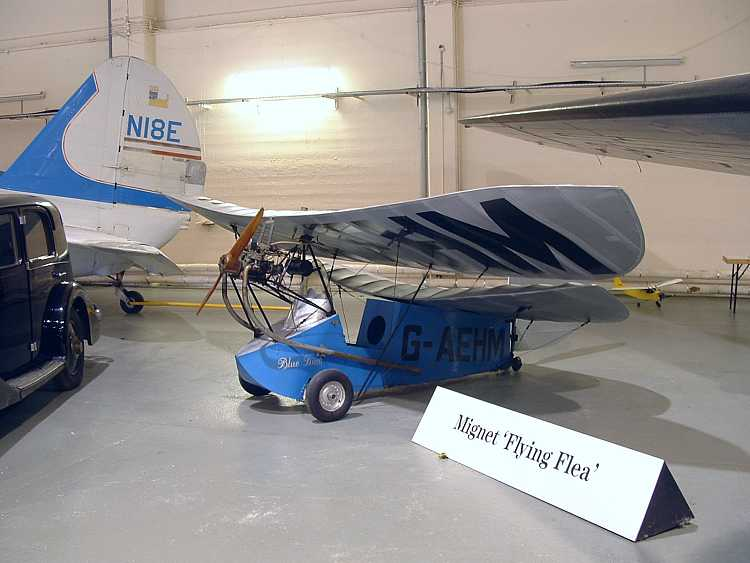
- HM.14 at The Science Museum at Wroughton

General information
- Type: Single-seat light aircraft
- Manufacturer: homebuilt aircraft
- Designer: Henri Mignet

History
- Manufactured: 1933-today
- Introduction date: 1933
- First flight: 10 September 1933

The Mignet HM.14 Flying Flea (Pou du Ciel literally "Louse of the Sky" in French) is a single-seat light aircraft first flown in 1933, designed for amateur construction. It was the first of a family of aircraft collectively known as Flying Fleas.

== Development ==
The HM.14 was designed by French radio engineer Henri Mignet. It was the result of his ambition to design a safe aeroplane that could be built quickly and cheaply by any amateur familiar with simple woodwork and metalwork skills. It followed a progressive series of designs, of which the HM.8 monoplane was already successful as an amateur-built aircraft. On 10 September 1933, at the Bois de Bouleaux near Soissons, Mignet piloted the first flight of the HM.14. In the following months, he made many flights with progressive modifications to improve its handling and performance, totalling 10 hours test-flying time. He described the HM.14 as his Pou no.4, presumably counting from the HM.11, that featured a large pivoting flap between the fixed front and rear wings. The prototype HM.14 had a wingspan of 6 m (20 ft). It was powered by an Aubier et Dunne 540 cc three-cylinder two-stroke motorcycle engine, producing about 17 hp (13 kW) at 4,000 rpm. The engine was connected to the propeller shaft via a chain drive with a 2.5:1 reduction ratio. Subsequent examples were built with many optional engine and wingspan variations.

In September 1934, the French aeronautical magazine Les Ailes published Mignet's article Le Pou du Ciel, in which he described the HM.14. In November 1934, he published his book Le Sport de l'Air that gave all the dimensioned details of materials, plus descriptions and techniques, to enable readers to construct and fly their own HM.14s without further specialist help. In September 1935, the Air League published an English translation of Le Sport de l'Air, and it was also serialised in the October, November and December 1935 issues of the magazine Newnes' Practical Mechanics.

== Design ==
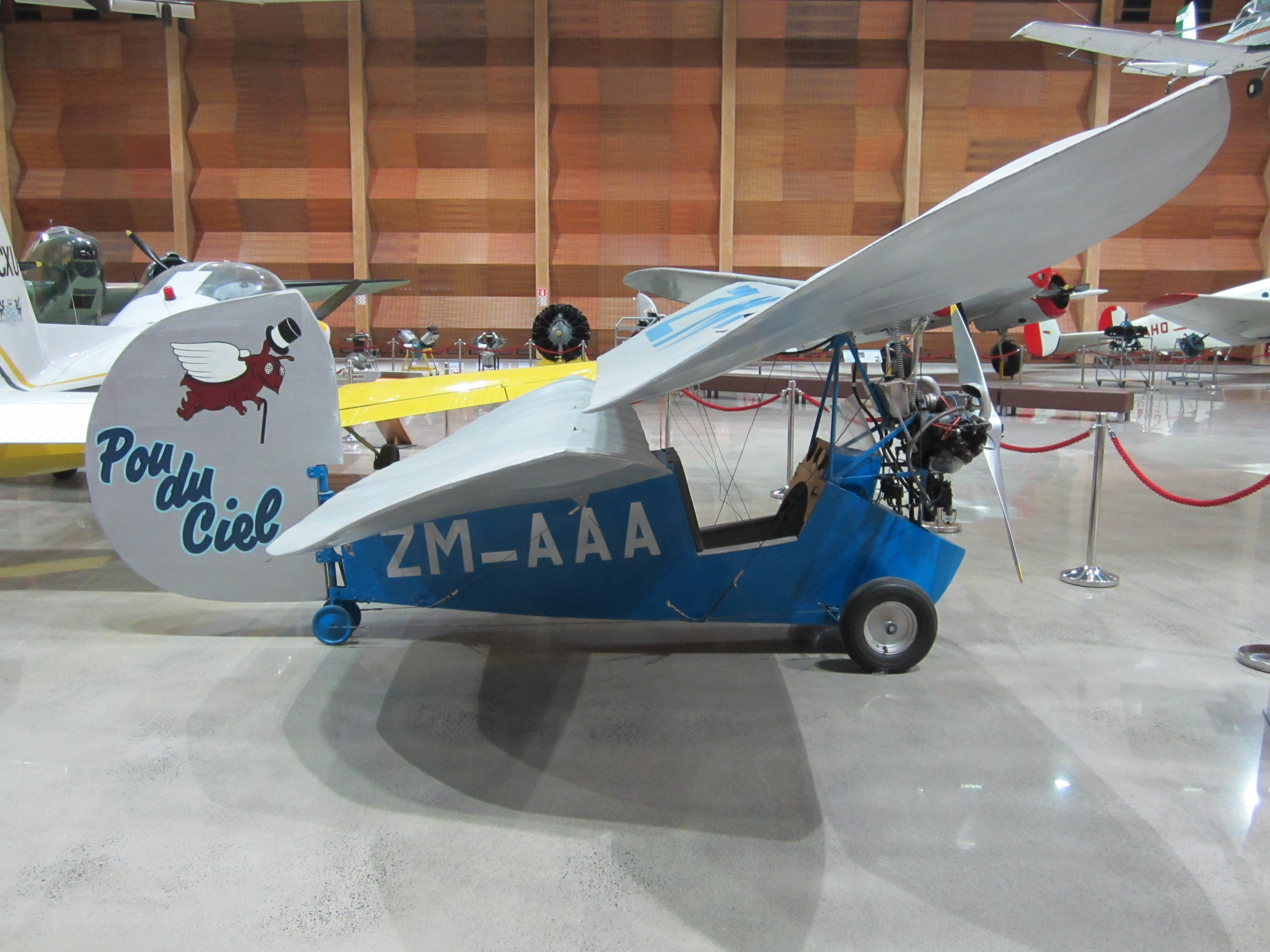
Side view of an HM.14 on display at MOTAT in Auckland

The HM.14 is most commonly described as a tandem wing aircraft, although the main wing overlaps the rear wing in the basic design, so it almost qualifies as a highly staggered biplane without a horizontal tail. Construction of the airframe employs mostly birch plywood sheet, spruce laths, steel tubing, steel cables, proprietary metal fittings and fixings, adhesives, and linen fabric.

Unlike conventional aircraft, the HM.14 has no ailerons or elevators, and no foot-operated flight controls. The flight control system comprises a conventional control stick. Fore-and-aft movement of the stick is transmitted via cables to the rear underside of the main wing, that is supported by a single pivot at the front underside, mounted on a pylon on the fuselage. Rearward movement of the stick pulls the cables, and increases the pitch and therefore the lift of the main wing. The aircraft will then pitch up, due to the centre of pressure being forward of the center of gravity. Forward stick movement has the reverse effect. Resistance to stick movement is usually an aerodynamic force from the main wing, but there is also a rubber spring (bungee) pulling down on the leading edge of the wing, and a telescopic strut behind the pilot's head limits the total wing movement. Side-to-side movement of the stick controls the all-moving rudder via cables. In flight, this produces a stable rolling motion, as required in a banked turn, because the wings both have dihedral. That rolling characteristic is not safely available during take-off or landing, so crosswinds are not easily tolerated.

== Operational history ==
- In late November 1934, Mignet exhibited his HM.14 at the Salon l'Aéronautique au Grand Palais in Paris, followed in early December by a public flying demonstration at Paris-Orly Airport.
- On 13 August 1935, Mignet piloted his HM.14 across the English Channel from Saint-Inglevert Airfield to Lympne Airport, and on 17 August displayed it to the press at Shoreham Airport.
- On 5 December 1935, Stephen Appleby piloted his HM.14 (G-ADMH) from Lympne Airport to Saint-Inglevert Airfield.
- On 13 April 1936, the Aero-8 Flying Club hosted a rally at Ashingdon, Essex, that attracted eight complete British-built HM.14s.
- On 3 August 1936, the First International Flying Flea Challenge Trophy Race was held at Ramsgate Airport, where three French and six British HM.14s attended. Various other aircraft types, including a HM.18 flown by Henri Mignet, gave flying displays. The Flying Flea handicap race was won by Edouard Bret in a HM.14 powered by a 17 hp Aubier et Dunne engine, while Stephen Appleby came second in G-ADMH, and Robert Robineau took third place.

== Variants ==
Mignet provided drawings for alternative 6 m and 5 m span wings. The choice usually depended on the power and weight of the intended engine. He specified no particular engine, and the choice often depended on local availability and cost. In France, engines for HM.14s in the 1930s included 17 hp Aubier et Dunne 540 cc three-cylinder two-stroke, 25 hp Mengin B (Poinsard) four-stroke two-cylinder boxer, 16 hp Clerget, 40 hp Salmson radial. In the UK, popular air-cooled engines were 16 hp Scott Flying Squirrel A2S 650 cc, 25 hp Anzani 1100 cc V-twin, 17–23 hp Douglas Sprite 500–750 cc, 34 hp Bristol Cherub 1100 cc. Conversions of water-cooled engines included 28 hp Carden-Ford 1200 cc and 13 hp Austin 7 750 cc four-cylinder types. The choice of engine and propeller combination also determined the option to drive the propeller directly from the crankshaft, or via a reduction chain drive or gearing.

On 14 July 1935, at Heston Aerodrome, Stephen Appleby piloted the first flight of his HM.14 (G-ADMH), the first to fly in the UK. On 24 July 1935, the Air Ministry awarded it the first ever Authorisation to Fly document, being equivalent to a UK Certificate of Airworthiness with additional conditions and limitations. Following a forced landing, it was repaired with modifications designed by L.E. Baynes, at the factory of Abbott-Baynes Sailplanes. The modifications included a new 6 metres (20 ft) span front wing with a repositioned wing pivot, a partial engine cowling, and a low-mounted radiator for the existing water-cooled Carden-Ford engine. The aircraft was later converted to replace the wing control cables with twin "push-rods". Following the publicity of the aircraft and those personalities, many British HM.14s under construction acquired similar features. In April 1936, Baynes made improvements to the Flying Flea design, similar to those on Appleby's HM.14, plus further major modifications. Those included a 6.7 metres (22 ft) newly designed front wing with two outboard wing pivots, that eliminated wing-bracing wires, hence the name Baynes Cantilever Pou. The prototype of that (G-AEGD), plus a later example (G-AEJD), were extensively test-flown and demonstrated by Appleby.

In the UK, variations of the HM.14 were made by about 200 serious amateurs. A handful of companies also hoped to produce kits and completed HM.14s, including Abbott-Baynes Aircraft, Dart Aircraft, F. Hills & Son, Luton Aircraft, E.G. Perman and Company, and Puttnam Aircraft Company. Up to the start of World War II in September 1939, UK Authorisations to Fly were issued to 76 HM.14s, while registrations were issued for a further 45 projected examples.

== Accidents and incidents ==
- On 19 August 1935, a HM.14 crashed fatally at Algiers, pilot Monsieur Marignan.
- On 14 September 1935, a HM.14 crashed fatally at Marseille, pilot Henri Chapalet.
- On 26 November 1935, a HM.14 crashed fatally at Caen, pilot Rene Besnard.
- On 15 March 1936, a HM.14 crashed fatally at Sergnyin, Switzerland, pilot Monsieur Kuffer.
- On 20 April 1936, a HM.14 (G-ADVL) crashed fatally at Renfrew aerodrome, pilot A.H. Anderson.
- On 4 May 1936, a HM.14 (G-AEEW) crashed fatally at Penshurst Airfield, pilot Ambrose M. Cowell.
- On 21 May 1936, a HM.14 (G-AEBS) crashed fatally at RAF Digby, pilot Sqn Ldr C.R. Davidson.
- On 20 September 1936, a HM.14 (G-ADXY) suffered a fatal ground accident unrelated to the aircraft flight performance, pilot James Goodall.

By March 1936, Algerian and Swiss authorities had banned the flying of HM.14s, and the French Air Ministry stepped up its actions from cautionary notices to flight testing by the Armée de l'air, that resulted in an inconclusive published report. In June 1936, the French Minister for Air stopped all Flea flights in France, pending full-size wind tunnel tests at Chalais-Meudon. In July 1936, the published report described how pitch-up control could be lost in a shallow nose-down attitude, because the pivoting front wing reduced the separation from the rear wing (the "slot effect"), so that the aircraft could not be recovered from a dive into the ground. The effect was worsened if the centre of gravity had not been correctly calculated and adjusted. Mignet responded with several design changes, such as pivoting rear wing, different aerofoil contours on both wings, elimination of the overlap between the wings, and an adjustable fore-and-aft wing pivot location relative to the fuselage. In late 1936, those features, together with rigid wing control struts ("push-rods"), were embodied in an updated edition of his book Le Sport de l'Air. In August 1936, the Royal Aircraft Establishment (RAE) at Farnborough started full-size wind tunnel tests using HM.14 G-AEFV. In October 1936, the report was published, confirming the French test findings. The Air Ministry then stopped renewing the Authorisation to Fly documents of all HM.14-related aircraft that had not received approved modifications. After World War II, no HM.14s were granted UK Authorisations to Fly, although several further examples were built.

== Aircraft on display ==
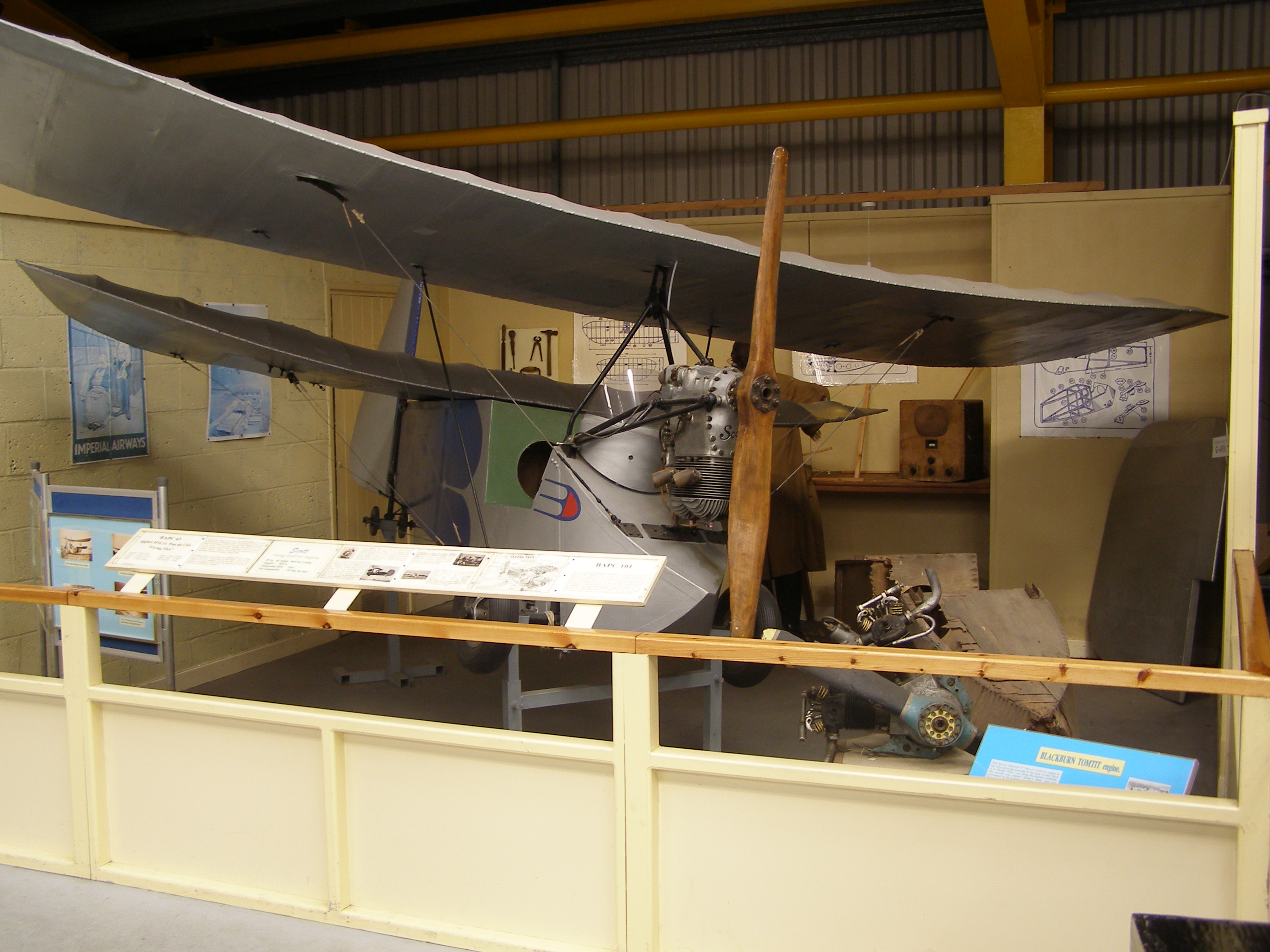
HM.14 at the Newark Air Museum

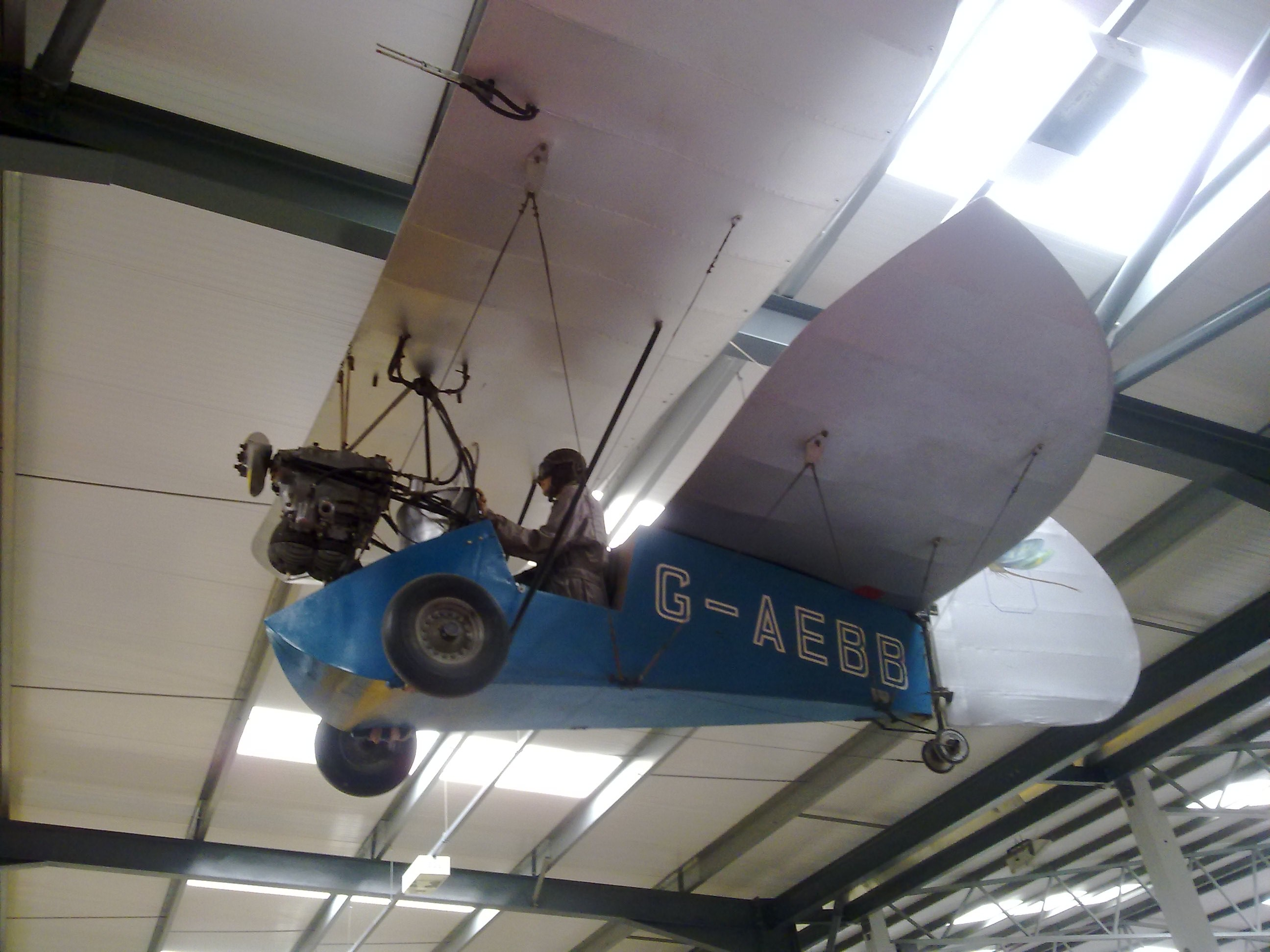
HM.14 at the Shuttleworth Collection

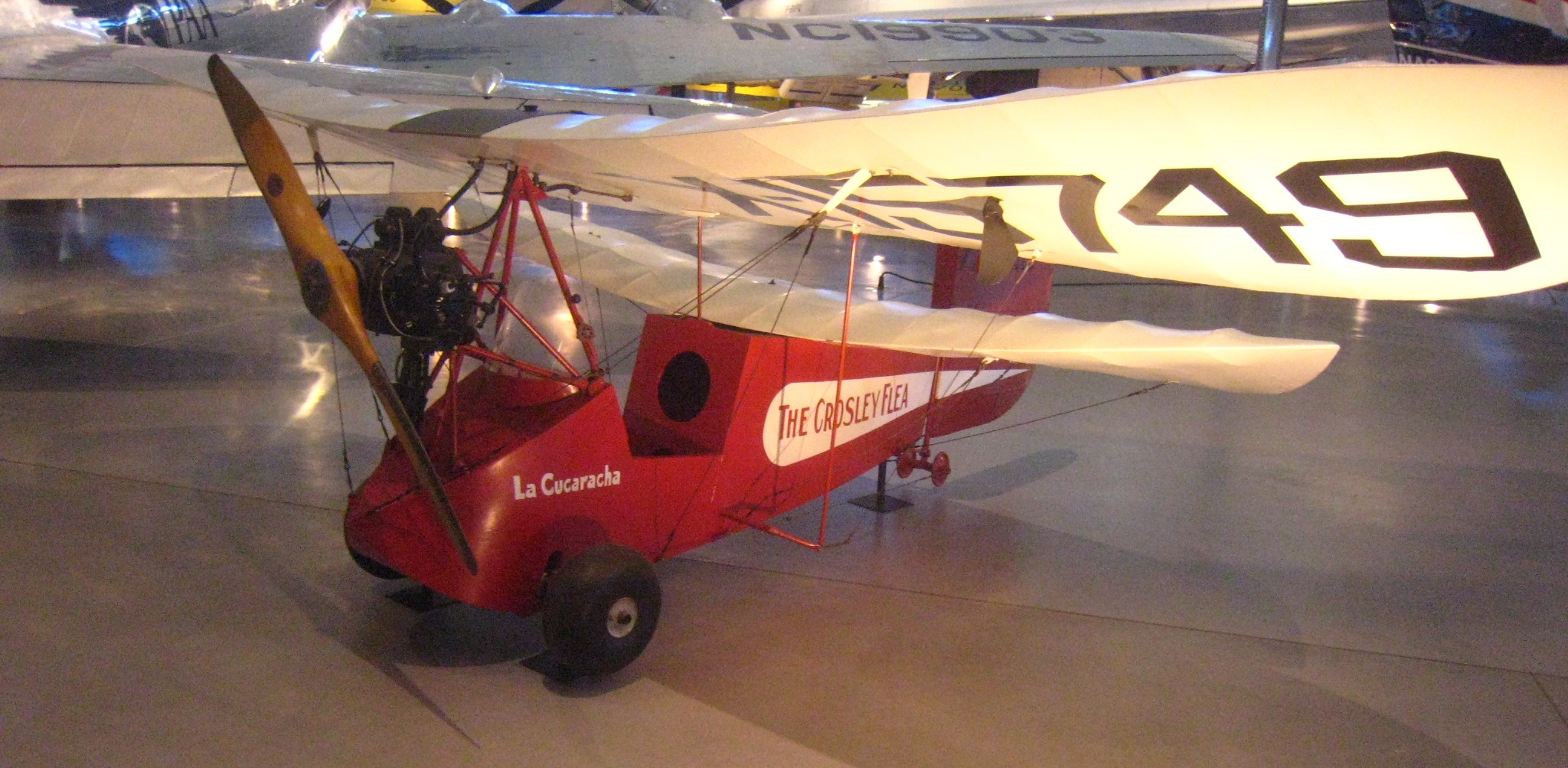
HM.14 at the National Air and Space Museum

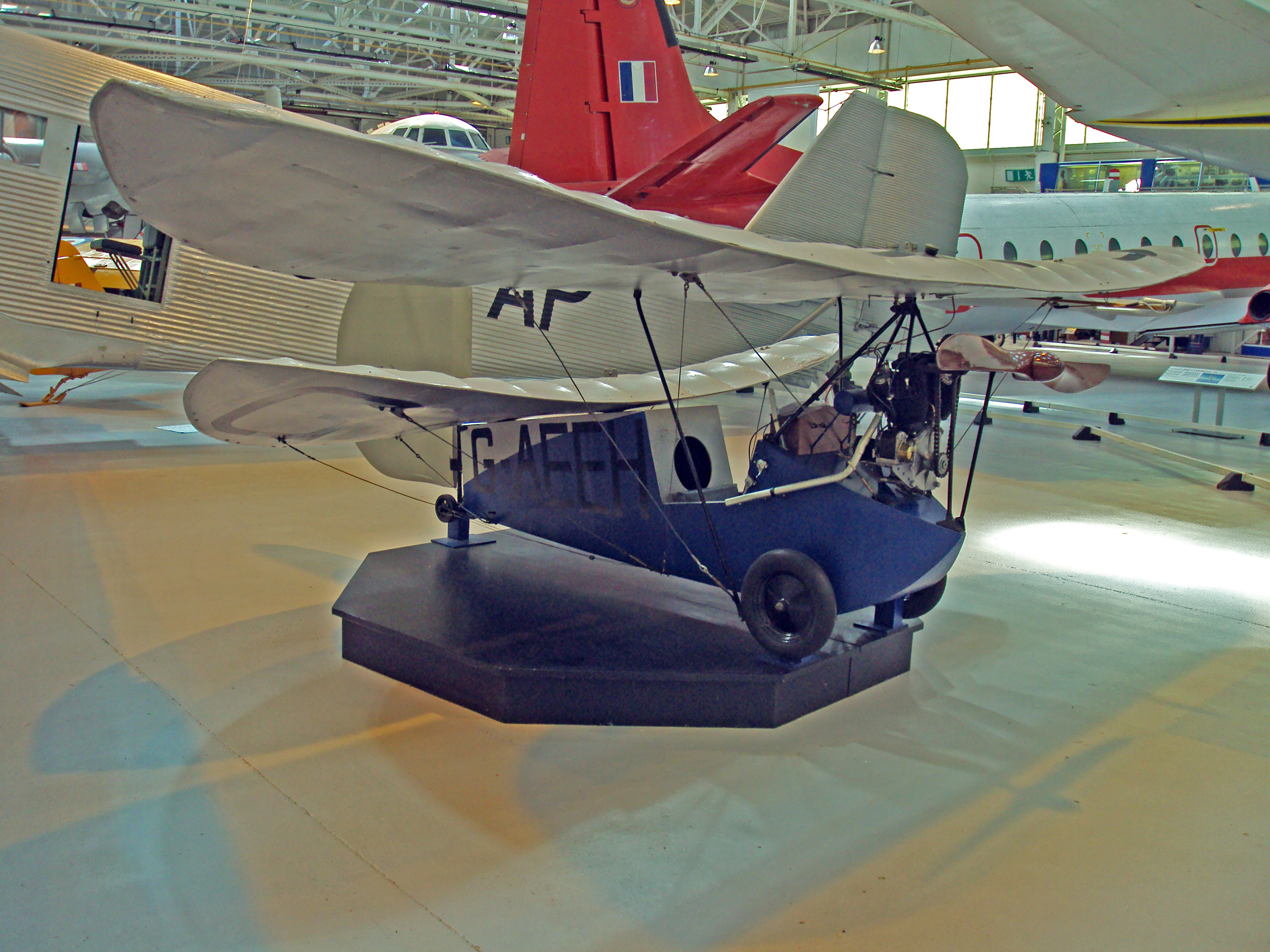
HM.14 at the Royal Air Force Museum Cosford

- Aeroventure/South Yorkshire Aircraft Museum - HM.14 (G-AEJZ)
- Ashburton Aviation Museum, Ashburton, New Zealand - HM.14 (ZM-AAM)
- Aviation Museum of Central Finland, Tikkakoski - HM.14 (OH-KAB)
- Aviodrome - HM.14 replica ("G-AEOF")
- Aviodrome - HM.14 (PH-POU)
- Barcelona Airport - HM.14
- Brooklands Museum - HM.14 replica (G-ADRY)
- Dart Airport Aviation Museum, Mayville, New York - HM.14
- Doncaster Museum and Art Gallery - HM.14 (G-AEKR)
- Hellenic Airforce Museum HM.14
- Lane Motor Museum, Nashville, Tennessee - HM.14
- Malta Aviation Museum, Ta' Qali - HM.14
- Midland Air Museum, Coventry, England - HM.14 (G-AEGV)
- Musée de l'Air et de l'Espace - HM.14
- Musée du Chateau de Savigny - HM.14
- Musée Régional de l'Air, Angers – Loire Airport - HM.14
- Museum of Science and Industry (Manchester) - HM.14 (BAPC.12)
- Museum of Transport and Technology, Auckland - HM.14 (ZM-AAA)
- NASM Udvar-Hazy Center, Washington DC - HM.14 (X15749)
- National Technical Museum (Prague) - HM.14
- Newark Air Museum - HM.14 (BAPC.43)
- Norfolk and Suffolk Aviation Museum, Flixton - HM.14 (BAPC.115)
- North East Land, Sea and Air Museums - HM.14 replica (G-ADVU)
- Parc Aeronàutic de Catalunya - In 1935, one HM.14 was built in the Spanish Republic. It was left unfinished before the Spanish Civil War, and was restored many years later. It is now on display at the Parc Aeronàutic de Catalunya.
- Prague Aviation Museum, Kbely - HM.14
- Queensland Museum, Brisbane, Australia - HM.14
- Real Aeroplane Company, Breighton - HM.14 (G-ADXS)
- Royal Air Force Museum Cosford - HM.14 (G-AEEH)
- Shuttleworth Collection - HM.14 (G-AEBB), with Bristol Cherub engine
- Sinsheim Auto & Technik Museum - HM.14 (D-EMIL)
- Solent Sky, Southampton - HM.14 replica (G-ADZW)
- Stockholm-Arlanda Airport - HM.14
- Stondon Transport Museum, UK - HM.14 replica (G-ADRG)
- Swiss Transport Museum, Lucerne - HM.14 (HBMH8)
- The Science Museum at Wroughton - HM.14 (G-AEHM)
- Wanaka Transport Museum, Wānaka - HM.14 (ZM-AAC)
- Yorkshire Air Museum - HM.14 replica (G-AFFI)

== Specifications (Baynes-modified G-ADMH) ==
Data from British light aeroplanes : their evolution, development and perfection, 1920-1940

General characteristics

- Crew: 1
- Length: 3.96 m (13 ft 0 in)
- Wingspan: 6 m (19 ft 8 in)
- Height: 1.68 m (5 ft 6 in)
- Wing area: 12.73 m^{2} (137.0 sq ft)
- Empty weight: 159 kg (351 lb)
- Max takeoff weight: 247 kg (545 lb)
- Powerplant: 1 × Carden-Ford 4-cylinder water-cooled in-line piston engine, 23 kW (31 hp)
- Propellers: 2-bladed fixed pitch propeller

Performance

- Maximum speed: 133 km/h (83 mph, 72 kn)
- Cruise speed: 106 km/h (66 mph, 57 kn)
- Stall speed: 52 km/h (32 mph, 28 kn)
- Range: 243 km (151 mi, 131 nmi)
- Rate of climb: 1.53 m/s (301 ft/min)
- Wing loading: 19.4 kg/m^{2} (4.0 lb/sq ft)
- Power/mass: 0.163 kW/kg (0.099 hp/lb)
