= Carden–Baynes Auxiliary =

British single-seat motor glider, 1935

Auxiliary
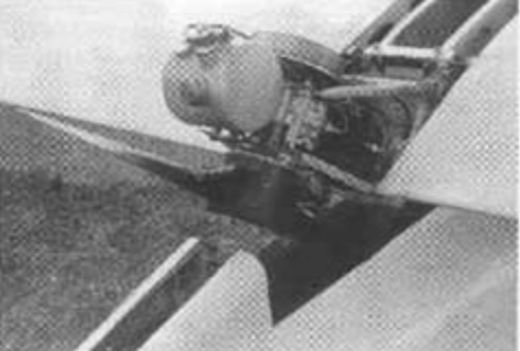
- Carden–Baynes Auxiliary with engine stowed. Flight Global archive

General information
- Type: Motor glider
- National origin: United Kingdom
- Manufacturer: Abbott–Baynes Sailplanes Ltd
- Designer: Leslie Baynes
- Number built: 2

History
- First flight: 8 August 1935
- Developed from: Abbott–Baynes Scud 3

The Carden–Baynes Auxiliary was the first motor glider with a retractable engine and propeller; it is known as the Abbott–Baynes Scud 3 when engineless. Both aircraft, built in the mid-1930s, were still flying in 2010 as pure sailplanes.

== Development ==
Edward Abbott and Leslie Baynes had already separately designed and built sailplanes when they joined forces in 1931 as Abbott–Baynes Sailplanes to produce Baynes' Scud I and II designs. The idea of adding an engine to a sailplane to make it self-launching, but mounted in such a way that propeller and engine could be retracted at altitude to produce an aerodynamically clean glider came from Sir John Carden, who had already collaborated with Abbott and Baynes on other projects. Baynes' Scud 3 was designed specifically to include such a launching aid but was also capable of high performance engineless flight. Without an engine it was known as the Abbott–Baynes Scud 3; with the engine, as the Carden–Baynes Auxiliary. Since the engine could be removed or retrofitted the nomenclature sometimes became confused. The Auxiliary is historically significant as the first sailplane with a retractable engine and propeller. CG Grey, respected editor of The Aeroplane, wrote after the first flight of the Scud 3, piloted by Dr Dewsbery "Dewsbery now holds the certainly unique position of being the first aviator to retract his motor and airscrew while flying."

The Scud 3 was an advanced sailplane in its time, all wood and with a long-span wing with heavy taper on the leading edge. The airfoil section was designed by Baynes and varied from the wing root outwards. At the centre it had a flat undersurface, making the wing thick and easy to strengthen as well as reducing wing root interference drag. Outwards, as thickness, chord and incidence reduced, the lower surface became increasingly concave, producing reflex camber. These features were intended to ensure that the stall started at the centre of the wing rather than at its tip. The ailerons were of the differential type. The wings were readily demountable for transport.

The fuselage was flat sided and plywood covered apart from near the nose; upper and lower surfaces were curved and again ply covered. The rounded nose was built up with a double layer of narrow spruce strips placed diagonally. The single cockpit was well ahead of the wings and their mounting pylon had a fairing which extended aft of the trailing edge and contained the engine. At the rear there was a tall fin with an unbalanced rudder. The tailplane was mounted about one third of the way up the fin, carrying split elevators; like the wings it could be removed for transport. The undercarriage was just a single wheel mounted partly inside the fuselage.

The unique feature of the Auxiliary was the powerplant and its mounting. Carden had selected a 250 cc single-cylinder, air-cooled two-stroke Villiers motorcycle engine. He encouraged Villiers to persuade this engine to run inverted, in order to put the propeller line to the top of the mounting and thus minimise air resistance. This proved satisfactory, and many hours of testing with the cowling in place and at full throttle showed there were no overheating problems. A small fuel tank was fixed above the crankcase, at the top of the engine. Carden also designed the engine mounting that enabled the engine and its propeller to be swung out of its housing and into action. The engine was hung to the top of the pylon bulkhead, just ahead of the trailing edge, on a diagonally cross-braced pair of tubes from the hinge to the crankcase and with V-tubes to the cylinder head. In use the engine and propeller were vertical, the latter having a small diameter to clear the lips of the open top of the fuselage. The engine was held in position by a diagonal longitudinal member attached to a nut on a screw thread which could be rotated with a crank in the cockpit. As the lower end of this member moved forward, the engine rotated into the horizontal position, its fairing closing the fuselage opening. The propeller was indexed to stop in a vertical position and its lower tip moved forward on retraction into a slot in the bulkhead, whilst the other blade pressed on a lever that caused hinged fairing doors, previously held open with springs, to close over it. With the engine retracted, the rear of the pylon was as smoothly faired as on any conventional sailplane.

One other unusual and possibly unique feature of the Auxiliary was that it had a secondary throttle on the port wing tip, so that the pilot could easily taxi the aircraft whilst supporting the wing.

The Scud 3 first flew as an unpowered aircraft in May 1935, and took off under its own power on 8 August that year. It got airborne in 450 ft (140 m) climbing to 2,000 ft (610m) in 15 minutes before Dr Dewsbery retracted the engine and flew it as a sailplane. This first aircraft was still fitted with its engine in 1949, when it was registered as G-ALJR, but in 2010 was flying as an unpowered sailplane. Photographs from the 1930s and '40s suggest that at some point the closing mechanism of the rear fairing was altered and a fixed slot provided for the propeller. A second Scud 3 was built in 1935 but not fitted with an engine until 1949, when a more powerful 350 cc Villiers was installed until late in 1951. It is on display at the Gliding Heritage Centre.

== Specifications (250 cc Villiers) ==
Data from Ord-Hume 2000, pp. 289

General characteristics

- Crew: 1
- Length: 22 ft 6 in (6.86 m)
- Wingspan: 45 ft 6 in (13.87 m)
- Height: 8 ft 2 in (2.49 m) with motor deployed, otherwise 4 ft 0 in (1.22 m)
- Wing area: 120 sq ft (11 m^{2})
- Aspect ratio: 16
- Airfoil: Special Baynes section
- Empty weight: 310 lb (141 kg) (Auxiliary)

117.94 kg (260 lb) (Scud 3)

- Gross weight: 500 lb (227 kg) (Auxiliary)

226.8 kg (500 lb) (Scud 3)

- Powerplant: 1 × Villiers Single-cylinder inverted two-stroke, air-cooled and with a capacity of 250 cc, 9 hp (6.7 kW) L.E. Baynes noted 8–9 hp maximum at 3,500 rpm

Performance

- Maximum speed: 40 mph (65 km/h, 35 kn)
- Cruise speed: 35 mph (56 km/h, 30 kn)
- Stall speed: 25 mph (40 km/h, 22 kn) (Scud 3)
- Endurance: powered, 30 min
- Maximum glide ratio: 1:21 (Auxiliary)

1:22 (Scud 3)

- Rate of sink: 132 ft/min (0.67 m/s) (Scud 3)

L.E. Baynes noted "about 120 ft/min for unpowered Scud 3 and estimated the extra weight of the engine increased this by 5%.

- Lift-to-drag: 24:1
- Wing loading: 4.2 lb/sq ft (20.5 kg/m^{2}) (Auxiliary)

18.31 kg/m^{2} (3.75 lb/sqft) – (Scud 3)
