= Watkinson Dingbat =

Dingbat

General information
- Type: Single-seat ultralight monoplane
- National origin: United Kingdom
- Manufacturer: Taylor Watkinson Aircraft Company
- Designer: E.T. Watkinson and C.W. Taylor
- Number built: 1

History
- First flight: June 1938

The Watkinson Dingbat was a 1930s British ultralight monoplane designed by E.T. Watkinson and C.W. Taylor.

== Design and development ==
The Dingbat, otherwise known as the Taylor Watkinson Ding-Bat, was a low-wing monoplane powered by a 30 hp (22 kW) Carden-Ford engine. It had a single-seat open cockpit and a fixed conventional landing gear. It was built at Teddington in Middlesex and registered G-AFJA it was first flown at Heston Aerodrome in June 1938.

It was stored during the Second World War, but restored to flying condition in 1959. After a crash in 1975, it was rebuilt, and was still registered in 2010.

== Specifications ==
Data from British Civil Aircraft since 1919

General characteristics

- Crew: 1
- Length: 16 ft 0 in (4.88 m)
- Wingspan: 28 ft 0 in (8.53 m)
- Height: 6 ft 3 in (1.91 m)
- Wing area: 125 sq ft (11.6 m^{2})
- Empty weight: 460 lb (209 kg)
- Gross weight: 700 lb (318 kg)
- Powerplant: 1 × Carden Ford water-cooled 4-cylinder piston engine, 32 hp (24 kW)

Performance

- Maximum speed: 90 mph (140 km/h, 78 kn)
- Cruise speed: 80 mph (130 km/h, 70 kn)
- Stall speed: 39 mph (63 km/h, 34 kn)
- Range: 200 mi (320 km, 170 nmi)
