= Robert Kronfeld =

Austrian gliding champion (1904–1948)

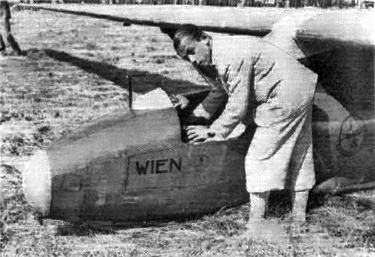
- Robert Kronfeld, with his Lippisch Wien glider, at Hanworth 28 June 1931
- Born: 5 May 1904; Vienna, Austria-Hungary
- Died: 12 February 1948 (aged 43); England
- Military career
- Allegiance: (Austria) Austrian (-1939), (United Kingdom) British (1939-1948)
- Branch: Royal Air Force
- Rank: Squadron Leader
- Awards: Gold Medal for Service to the Republic of Austria (Goldene Medaille für Verdienste um die Republik Österreich;1932-10-06); Air Force Cross
- Other work: Aerospace engineer, Glider pilot, test pilot

Signature
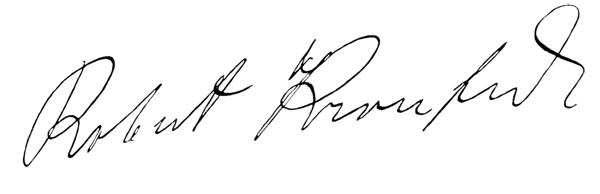

Squadron Leader Robert Kronfeld, AFC (5 May 1904 – 12 February 1948) was an Austrian-born gliding champion and sailplane designer of the 1920s and 30s. He became a British subject and an RAF test pilot. He was killed testing a glider in 1948.

== Early life ==
Kronfeld was born in Vienna, the son of dentist also called Robert Kronfeld (1874–1946), who was nephew of Adolf Kronfeld (de) (doctor, writer), Ernst Moriz Kronfeld (de) (botanist), both Galician Jews. In his youth his favourite sport was boating.

== Gliding ==
As a young man, he visited the Wasserkuppe in Germany and became passionate about the sport of gliding that was developing there. So Kronfeld became a member of the first Austrian gliding school. He befriended Walter Georgii, who was a meteorologist working at the nearby Darmstadt University of Technology and who had recently discovered thermals. Kronfeld became something of a test-pilot for Georgii, investigating this still-new phenomenon with the assistance of a variometer disguised as a vacuum flask.

In 1926, the German newspaper Grüne Post offered a RM 5,000 prize for the first glider pilot to fly 100 km (62 mi). Kronfeld took up the challenge in 1929 and selected a long chain of hills, the Teutoburger Wald, as a promising site for the record attempt.
He took off in a glider of his own design, named Wien ("Vienna"), launched by bungee, near Ibbenbüren. After a flight lasting over five hours, he landed near Detmold, 102.5 km away. Kronfeld used the prize money to build a gigantic sailplane, named Austria, which had a wingspan of 30 metres - a record not to be matched until the end of the twentieth century. Kronfeld was awarded the Hindenburg Cup in 1930. In the same year he undertook the first flight from a mountain in Lower Austria. He also staged large air shows. By 1930 he held the world records for distance (164 km) and height (2,589 m).

In 1930 he also had success gliding in England.

On 15 February 1931 Robert Kronfeld and Wolf Hirth were the first men awarded the "Silver C".

On 20 June 1931 Kronfeld was the first pilot to fly a glider across the English Channel, making a return flight the same day. For this he won £1000 from the Daily Mail

Kronfeld was an Air Scout within the Österreichischer Pfadfinderbund and took part in the 4th World Scout Jamboree (1933) in Hungary as a member of the Austrian contingent. He participated in the Air Scout camp and contributed to the Airshow. He served as Commissioner for Air Scouts of the Österreichischer Pfadfinderbund. Kronfeld also was an honorary member of this Scout association.

In addition to being the first person to pilot a glider across the English Channel, on Saturday 4 June 1938, Kronfeld became the first pilot to fly a towed glider across the Irish Sea. Under tow from an Avro Cadet piloted by Mark Lacayo, they departed Kirby Moorside, Yorkshire, proceeding westwards via Blackpool the original planned point in order to make the crossing to Ronaldsway Airport, Isle of Man.

However, with an airspeed of 65 knots flying into a 50 knot head wind resulting in a groundspeed of 15 knots, it was difficult to make concerted progress and at one point Lacayo suggested abandoning the attempt. The wind was causing significant problems in addition to lowering cloud and had blown the aircraft and glider 30 nautical miles off course. Nevertheless, Kronfeld was determined to make the attempt and they managed to fix their position at 2,000 feet above St Bees Head and re-planned a crossing to Maughold Head. The weather resulted in the aircraft and glider descending to only 50 feet above the sea and a further problem was being caused by reducing visibility and the approaching darkness. The sea crossing took 1 hour 50 minutes. Due to the weather conditions a landing at Ronaldsway Airport could not be made and this resulted in them diverting to Hall Caine Airport, touching down at 20:00hrs. On Tuesday 7 June, Kronfeld gave an exhibition of aerobatics over Ronaldsway as a feature of the 1938 Manx Air Derby.

== Exile ==
In 1933, the new Nazi government prohibited Jews from flying, and as a Jew, Kronfeld fled Germany first for Austria, later for the United Kingdom. In 1934 he was awarded the Silver medal of the Lilienthal Society. There, he continued flying, taking over the British Aircraft Company, and in 1938 became chief instructor for the newly founded Oxford University and City Gliding Club (now split up in the Oxford University Gliding Club and the separate Oxford Gliding Club). He settled in England in January 1938 and his father followed him to England in 1939.

Kronfeld was a member of the Österreichischer Aero Club and brought the records of this association to the United Kingdom.

In 1939 he became a British citizen and during World War II he served in the Royal Air Force. He held the rank of Squadron Leader. He was posted to the Airborne Forces Experimental Establishment on military glider development. For that work he was awarded the Air Force Cross.

Post war, as Chief Test Pilot for General Aircraft, he was killed in the crash of an experimental flying wing glider - the General Aircraft GAL 56 (TS507) - during stalling trials, at Lower Froyle after taking-off from Lasham Airfield. After successfully recovering from a stall, the aircraft entered an inverted dive. His observer was able to leave the aircraft and survived despite a low level parachute opening.

== Aircraft tested ==
- British Aircraft Company Drone
- Baynes Bat - tailess military glider

== Memory and legacy ==
There are streets named after Robert Kronfeld in Detmold (Robert-Kronfeld-Straße), Fulda (Robert-Kronfeld-Straße), Oerlinghausen (Robert-Kronfeld-Straße), Gerasdorf (Kronfeldgasse), Graz (Kronfeldgasse) and Vienna (Kronfeldgasse).

In 1990 a memorial stone, commemorating the first 100 km flight by Kronfeld in 1929, was erected by the Heimatverein am Hermannshöhenweg near Riesenbeck.

In 1997 a memorial stone was erected on the Königsberg near Detmold (GPS 51° 55' N, 8° 53' E), where Kronfeld landed after his 100 km flight.

The Robert-Kronfeld-Memorial Prize (Robert-Kronfeld-Gedächtnispreis) is awarded by the Segelflugschule Oerlinghausen, since 1979. "The-Robert-Kronfeld-Cup was awarded by the State Government of Austria on the occasion of the 21st World Gliding Championships 1989 in Wiener Neustadt." It is also named The Robert Kronfeld Challenge Cup. There is also a Robert Kronfeld-contest (Robert-Kronfeld-Wettbewerb) organized by the Segelflugschule Oerlinghausen.

In 1961 the Robert Kronfeld Memorial flight from Innsbruck to Kufstein (Kronfeld-Gedächnissegelflug) took place and a special cachet was issued commemorating this flight. In 1994 a special cachet was issued commemorating Robert Kronfeld's 90th Birthday. Robert Kronfeld was commemorated in an exhibition in the National Scout Center of the Österreichischer Pfadfinderbund in Vienna in September 2010 and stamp and special cachet were issued.

An Air Scout group of the Österreichischer Pfadfinderbund in the 1960s was named after Robert Kronfeld.

The sole surviving Kronfeld Drone de Luxe, G-AEKV, built in 1936, is preserved at Brooklands Museum, Surrey, UK. Acquired by Mike Beach in the early 1980s and restored to flying condition at Brooklands around 1984, 'KV was later purchased by Brooklands Museum with the support of a Heritage Lottery Fund grant and is kept in ground running condition.

An orchard in memory of Robert and his son was created at Lasham Airfield in 2014.

In the years following Kronfeld's death his widow, Margaret, approached L Wingfield MC DFC, to create a lasting memorial, to which the Oxford Gliding Club, was reformed, flying at Kidlington Airport in 1951. Kronfeld been the first permanent Chief Flying Instructor in 1938. The club is still operating, based at RAF Weston-on-the-Green to the north of Oxford City.
