= Sir John Carden, 6th Baronet =

English aviator, inventor, automotive engineer

Sir John Carden, Bt MBE
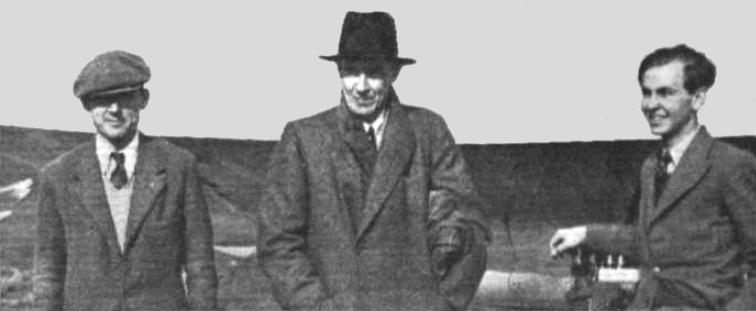
- Carden at Heston Airport 3 October 1935; L. E. Baynes on left, Stephen Appleby on right
- Born: 6 February 1892; London, England
- Died: 10 December 1935 (aged 43); Tatsfield, England
- Engineering career
- Employer: Vickers
- Projects: Carden, Carden-Loyd, Carden Aero Engines, Carden-Baynes
- Significant design: Carden Loyd tankette

Sir John Valentine Carden, 6th Baronet MBE (6 February 1892 – 10 December 1935) was an English tank and vehicle designer. He was the sixth baronet of Templemore, County Tipperary, from 1931.

== Work ==
Born in London, Carden ran a company from 1914 to 1916 that manufactured light passenger-cars under the brand Carden. The company's first model was a cyclecar, with seating only for the driver.

During the First World War, Carden served in the Army Service Corps and gained the rank of captain, acquiring experience with vehicles such as tracked Holt tractors.

After the war, he returned to car manufacturing but sold his original design and factory to Ward and Avey who renamed it the AV. He then designed a new cyclecar and started manufacture at Ascot but at the end of 1919 sold the design to E. A. Tamplin who continued manufacture as the Tamplin car. A further design followed with a two-seat fibreboard body. Carden even sold one of these to King Alfonso XIII of Spain before selling the company to new owners in 1922 who renamed it the New Carden.

Aside from tanks, Carden and Loyd also developed several light artillery tractors and carriers, including the VA D50 model, which was a prototype of the Bren Carrier. Carden's interest in flying also led him to build an ultralight plane based on the French "Flying Flea", using a modified Ford engine uprated from 10 bhp to 31 bhp. In 1935, Carden started Carden Aero Engines Ltd., an aircraft engine manufacturer. A partnership with L.E. Baynes led to the founding of Carden Baynes Aircraft Ltd., which produced gliders of Baynes' design fitted with auxiliary engines.

John Carden was killed in an air crash near Tatsfield, Surrey on 10 December 1935, while flying on a Sabena airliner.

== Notes ==
Baronetage of Ireland
Preceded by John Craven Carden	Carden (of Templemore); 1931–1935	Succeeded by John Craven Carden
