= Heston Aerodrome =

Airport near London, England, 1929–1947

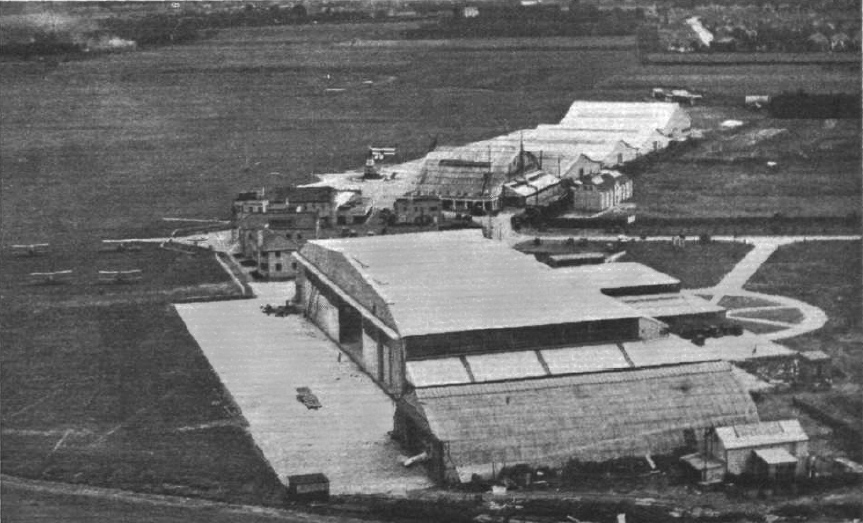
- Heston Aerodrome central buildings, July 1935, looking east
- IATA: none; ICAO: none

Summary
- Airport type: Defunct
- Opened: 5 July 1929
- Closed: 1947
- Coordinates: 51°29′12.1″N 000°23′50.2″W

Map
- Location within Greater London

Heston Aerodrome was an airfield located to the west of London, England, operational between 1929 and 1947. It was situated on the border of the Heston and Cranford areas of Hounslow, Middlesex. In September 1938, the British Prime Minister, Neville Chamberlain, flew from Heston to Germany three times in two weeks for talks with Adolf Hitler, and returned to Heston from the Munich Conference with the paper referred to in his later "Peace for our time" speech from 10 Downing Street.

== History ==
=== Private flying ===
Heston Air Park was conceived by fellow pilots and aircraft co-owners Nigel Norman and Alan Muntz in 1928, and it was constructed by their new company, Airwork Ltd. It was officially opened on 5 July 1929, to coincide with hosting the two-day King's Cup air race. By then, the Airwork Flying School had become well established, many privately owned aircraft had moved in, and the Household Brigade Flying Club, also known as the Guards flying club, had moved from Brooklands. Frequent public events helped promote Heston as a major centre of private flying, air displays, public demonstrations of new aircraft types, 'garden parties', air races, and as the starting point for long-distance flight record attempts. The King's Cup race was again staged at Heston in 1931. From the start, the first UK use of a concrete hangar and concrete aprons had already been established. Additional hangars and facilities, and expansion of the airfield, continued through the 1930s.

=== Commercial operations ===
In September 1931, Heston Air Park was renamed Heston Airport, following provision of customs facilities and ongoing improvements for passenger handling. Night flying facilities were installed and further developed, and in 1932 it was designated as a commercial diversionary airport, often required when Croydon Airport was fog-bound. It is claimed that the central building was the first purpose-built airport control tower, on which all modern control towers are based.

In April 1933, Spartan Air Lines started a twice-daily service to Cowes in the Isle of Wight. During 1934, the service operated from Croydon Airport, but reverted to Heston for the 1935 season, in collaboration with Railway Air Services. On 28 January 1934, Jersey Airways started a daily service to Jersey, landing on St. Aubin's beach at West Park, St Helier. In May 1934, the Portsmouth, Southsea, and Isle of Wight Company (PS&IOW) started a service from Heston to the Isle of Wight. In May 1934, the British Air Navigation Company (BANCO) started operating scheduled services to Le Touquet, Dieppe, Pourville, and Deauville, having previously operated cross-Channel charters. Other resident charter or aircraft hire companies included Air Commerce Ltd, Anglo-American Air Services, Birkett Air Service Ltd, Wrightson Air Hire (renamed 1934 as Air Hire Ltd). In 1934 and 1935, United Airways Ltd operated services from Heston to Stanley Park Aerodrome (Blackpool) In 1936, British Airways Ltd, formed by mergers of Spartan Air Lines, United Airways Ltd and Hillman's Airways, started scheduled services at Heston, then moved to Gatwick Airport, then to Croydon Airport, before returning to Heston in May 1938, remaining until April 1940.

=== Resident aircraft manufacturers ===
Manufacturers at Heston included Comper Aircraft Company (1933–1934), Chrislea Aircraft (1936–1947), Heston Aircraft Company (1934–1948), Fairey Aviation Company (1945–1947). Lesser use of the airfield was by Carden-Baynes Aircraft, Navarro Safety Aircraft. First flights took place of the first UK-built Mignet HM.14 "Flying Flea", Watkinson Dingbat, Luton Minor, Helmy Aerogypt, Hafner AR.III gyroplane and the Fane F.1/40.

=== Flight record attempts ===
On 25 September 1930, Mrs Victor Bruce took off in her Blackburn Bluebird IV (G-ABDS, named Bluebird) on a round-the-world solo flight. On 24 November, having covered 10,330 miles in 25 flying days, she reached Tokyo. She travelled by ship to Vancouver, where the Bluebird was re-assembled. She flew via Medford, Oregon, Tucson, Arizona, San Diego and Baltimore to New York City, where she embarked on a ship bound for Le Havre. On 19 February 1931, she flew to Lympne Airport, having flown about 19,000 miles and set several world records. The next day, she was given an aerial escort to Croydon Airport, where a reception of press and celebrities awaited her. She later flew back to Heston, and was greeted there by Nigel Norman.

On 10 July 1933, an Avro 618 Ten (VH-UXX) named Faith in Australia arrived at Heston, having failed to break the Australia-to-England flight record, after making a forced landing in Persia due to a broken piston. The pilot was Charles Ulm, accompanied by Gordon Taylor and G. U. 'Scotty' Allan. The aircraft was repaired by Avro Aircraft, then Ulm and his crew (G. U. Allan, P. G. Taylor and J. A. W. Edwards) made preparations at Heston for an attempt on a transatlantic flight record to Newfoundland via Ireland. Unfortunately, on 27 July 1933, the undercarriage collapsed at Portmarnock Strand, and Ulm abandoned that attempt. On 12 October 1933, Ulm, Allan, Taylor and Edwards took off in VH-UXX from Great West Aerodrome, and flew to Derby, Western Australia, breaking the England-to-Australia flight record.

On 9 August 1934, the first flight from inland Canada (Wasaga Beach, Ontario) to the UK, a distance of 3,700 miles, landed at Heston after a flying time of 30 hours 55 minutes. The pilots, J.R.Ayling and L.G.Reid, in a DH.84 Dragon (G-ACJM) named "Trail of the Caribou", were attempting to beat the then long-distance flying record (5,657 miles) by flying 6,300 miles from Wasaga Beach to Baghdad. However, icing of the engine throttle controls increased fuel consumption and, together with bad weather, resulted in the flight being terminated early.

=== Expansion plans ===
During the late 1930s, the British government had been studying the future of air transport and airports in the London area. It had been decided that London would be served by four airports – Croydon, Heston, and new airfields at Fairlop in Essex and Lullingstone, Kent. To this end, improvements and extensions had already begun at Heston, with the intention of bringing it up to the most modern standards of airports elsewhere in Europe. New drainage was put in, and trees near the flight path were removed. Runway lighting and radio aids to landing were installed. Land and buildings around the site were bought up for expansion, including St Mary's Boys Orphanage in North Hyde that was demolished. In 1937, the airport was bought by the Air Ministry, and developed to become almost as large as Croydon Airport, making it London's second airport at that time. Imperial Airways served the British Empire from Croydon, and British Airways served European destinations from Heston. The area of the landing field was then 3,540 feet by 2,700 feet.

The Air Ministry (Heston and Kenley Aerodromes Extension) Act 1939 authorised the compulsory purchase of land, and road closures needed for further expansion. The plans met objections, especially from the Heston Aircraft Company, whose production facility on the site was planned to be demolished in December 1939. In 1939 work on this expansion started, demolishing some houses in or near Cranford, including Tentlow Farm, and cutting down fruit trees, but the start of the Second World War stopped this. In early 1948 the Secretary of State for Air registered ownership of Tentlow Farm, Cranford, Middlesex.

=== "Peace for our time" 1938 ===
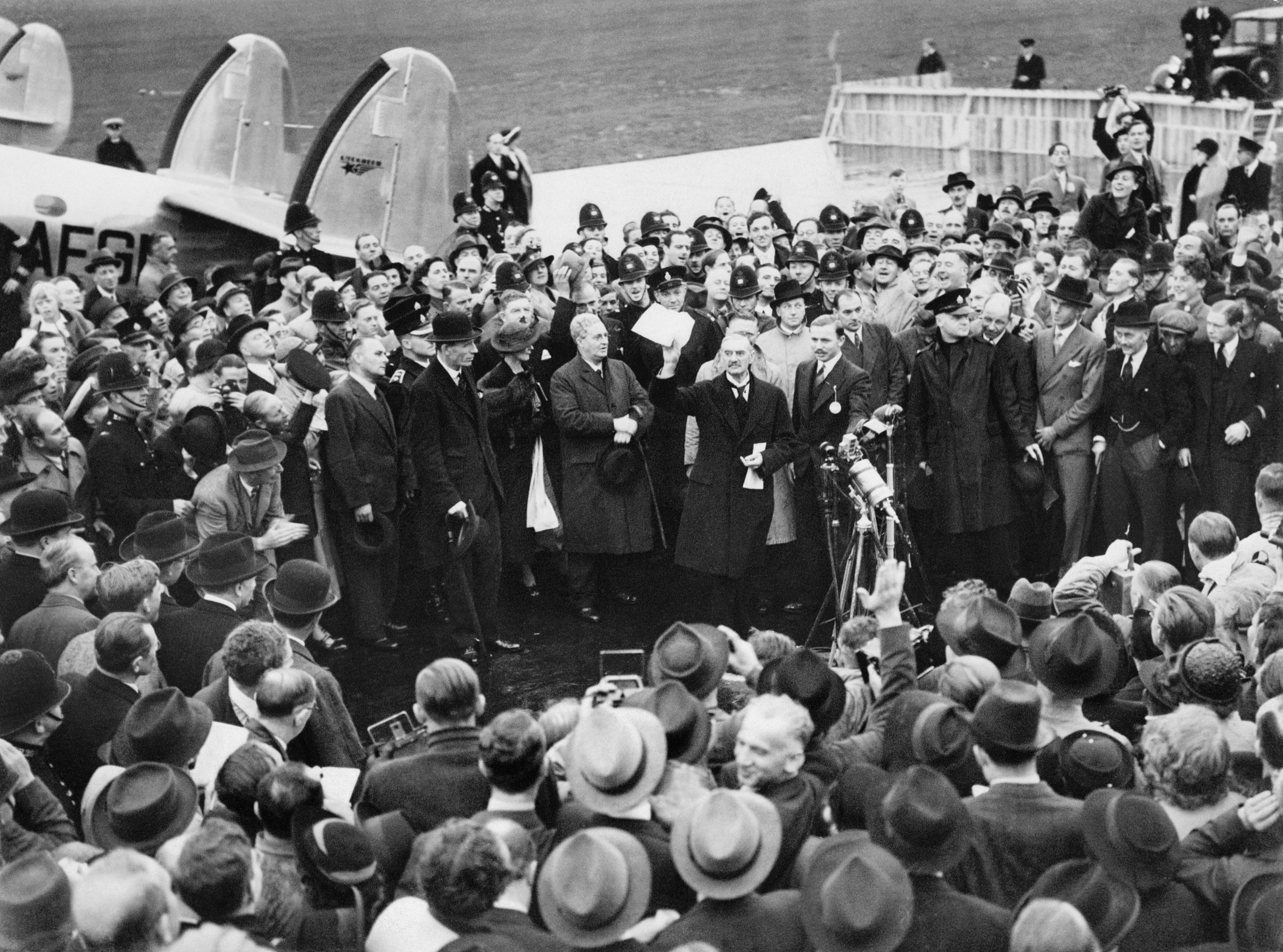
Neville Chamberlain holding the paper containing the resolution to commit to peaceful methods signed by both Hitler and himself on his return from Munich. He is showing the piece of paper to a crowd at Heston Aerodrome on 30 September 1938.

On 15 September 1938, British prime minister Neville Chamberlain flew from Heston to Munich for a meeting with German Chancellor Adolf Hitler at Berchtesgaden. Lockheed 10 Electra G-AEPR of British Airways Ltd was used on that first of three occasions, piloted by C. Nigel Pelly. On 22 September 1938, Chamberlain flew to Cologne Bonn Airport for a meeting at Bad Godesberg in Lockheed 14 G-AFGN, flown by Eric Robinson. On 29 September 1938, G-AFGN was piloted by Victor Flowerday on the final trip to Munich, which resulted in the controversial Munich Agreement, followed by Chamberlain's widely publicised return at Heston on 30 September 1938, and his subsequent "Peace for our time" speech.

=== Airline operations 1939–1940 ===
The Air Ministry had intended to completely take over the Heston site from Airwork Ltd in September 1939 for civil airline operations, but the declaration of war intervened, and the plans were never implemented. By 1 September 1939, the aircraft and administrations of British Airways Ltd (BAL) and Imperial Airways were physically transferred to Bristol (Whitchurch) Airport, to be operated jointly by National Air Communications (NAC). Services to Paris - Le Bourget Airport, Stockholm, and other overseas destinations continued, using types including DH.86, Lockheed 14, DH.91 Albatross, AW.27 Ensign. From October 1939, airlines of neutral countries (such as Belgium, Denmark, Netherlands) were only permitted to fly to coastal civilian airfields such as Shoreham Airport, but Air France was allowed to operate Dewoitine D.338s between Paris and Heston. On 1 April 1940, British Airways Ltd and Imperial Airways were officially merged as a new company, British Overseas Airways Corporation (BOAC).

After the surrender of the Netherlands on 14 May 1940, several KLM aircraft evaded capture, and converged on the UK. On 4 June 1940, BOAC started a Heston to Lisbon service, using DH.91 Albatrosses, to connect with transatlantic services of Pan American World Airways (Pan Am) that used Boeing 314 flying boats. Following the fall of France (22 June 1940), on 26 June 1940 the BOAC Lisbon service was switched to the DC-3s chartered from KLM with Dutch crews; by August 1940, five DC-3s were registered in Britain to a KLM subsidiary, nominally based at Heston. In late August 1940, all BOAC aircraft still operating from Heston were transferred to Whitchurch, including the KLM DC-3s. For the Lisbon service, a KLM DC-3 would fly to Heston to pick up passengers, then return to Whitchurch for onward travel to Lisbon. On 21 September 1940, KLM DC-3 G-AGBC crashed in fog on landing at Heston during such a flight. Two days earlier on 19 September 1940, a German parachute mine had demolished Heston's large 'Dawbarn' hangar, formerly occupied by BAL in 1939, and previously by Airwork. No further airline operations took place at Heston.

=== Military operations 1939–1945 ===
On 22 September 1939, a clandestine photographic unit, the 'Heston Flight' was absorbed into the RAF, and its civilian head Sidney Cotton was enlisted with the rank of Squadron Leader. On 1 November 1939, it was renamed No. 2 Camouflage Unit, then to No. 1 Photographic Development Unit on 17 January 1940. On 18 June 1940, it was renamed No. 1 Photographic Reconnaissance Unit under the command of Wing Commander G.W. Tuttle. After the parachute mine incident on 19 September 1940 had damaged several of its aircraft, No. 1 PRU was transferred to RAF Benson on 27 December 1940. On 12 May 1941, No. 1422 Flight RAF was formed under the command of Squadron Leader A.E. Clouston, flying a wide variety of aircraft for interception trials, including Turbinlite versions of the Douglas Havoc and de Havilland Mosquito. After disbandment in 1944, this unit became the Special Projectile Flight of the Royal Aircraft Establishment, remaining at Heston. During the war, units temporarily based at Heston included RAF Polish fighter squadrons 302, 303, 306, 308, 315, 316, 317, using mostly Spitfire Vs and Hurricanes. Other units included 515 Sqn, 129 Sqn, 116 Sqn, No. 53 OTU, No. 61 OTU, No. 85 Group Communication Unit RAF. Transient United States Army Air Forces units included 2008th Army AF Headquarters Sqn, 27th Air Transport Group, 86th Air Transport Sqn, 325th Ferrying Sqn, 112th Liaison Sqn.

The following units were here at some point:

- No. 133 (Polish) Airfield Headquarters RAF
- No. 144 Gliding School RAF
- No. 212 Squadron RAF
- No. 350 (Belgian) Squadron RAF
- No. 405 Repair & Salvage Unit
- No. 411 (Polish) Repair & Salvage Unit
- 701 Naval Air Squadron
- No. 1422 (Night Fighter) Flight RAF
- No. 2783 Squadron RAF Regiment
- No. 4138 Anti-Aircraft Flight RAF Regiment
- Airborne Target Illumination Flight RAF
- Allied Expeditionary Air Forces Communication Flight RAF
- Allied Expeditionary Air Forces Communication Squadron RAF
- Supreme Headquarters Allied Expeditionary Force (RAF) Communication Squadron RAF

=== Post–Second World War ===
After the war, the 1939 plans for four London airports were scrapped. Heathrow had by then been chosen as the main London Airport, and its proximity would have made regular flying from Heston aerodrome impossible.

In the immediate post war years, the airfield was home to a U.S.A.F. base with American servicemen posted there. The grass around the runway became unkempt after a while and it often resembled a wheat field.

Since official closure in 1947, several aircraft movements have occurred. On 9 June 1951, a BOAC (staff) Sports Festival was held, and aircraft that landed at the site included a Miles M.14A Hawk Trainer, DH.82A Tiger Moth, Auster J/1B Aiglet, DH.104 Dove, DH.84 Dragon, and perhaps two others. Parts of the airport land were still owned by the British government in 1962, when the M4 motorway construction was started. Additional land was needed for a motorway service area (Heston Services), that was built in 1965 over the northern half of the 1940s aerodrome site. The terminal buildings continued to be used by the Civil Aviation Authority (CAA) until June 1978, and those buildings were demolished later that year. The last confirmed aircraft movement was a 'farewell' flight for CAA staff by Bell 206B JetRanger helicopter (G-BCWN) on 6 June 1978.

==== Woodason Aircraft Models ====
Heston Aerodrome was the site of Woodason Aircraft Models during the 1930s and after the Second World War. The company was founded by Victor Woodason (1904–1964), who created detailed aircraft models, for the aviation industry, airlines, movies, the Air Ministry and other government agencies, merchandisers, advertising, aircraft owners and collectors. Woodason was forced to vacate the airport in 1939, and his workshop then operated from a farmhouse, Grange Farm, on the eastern boundary of Heston aerodrome. Around this time the company was acquired by Whitney Straight's Straight Corporation and a further workshop was established at Weston Airport to help meet the great demand for models during World War II.

== Today ==
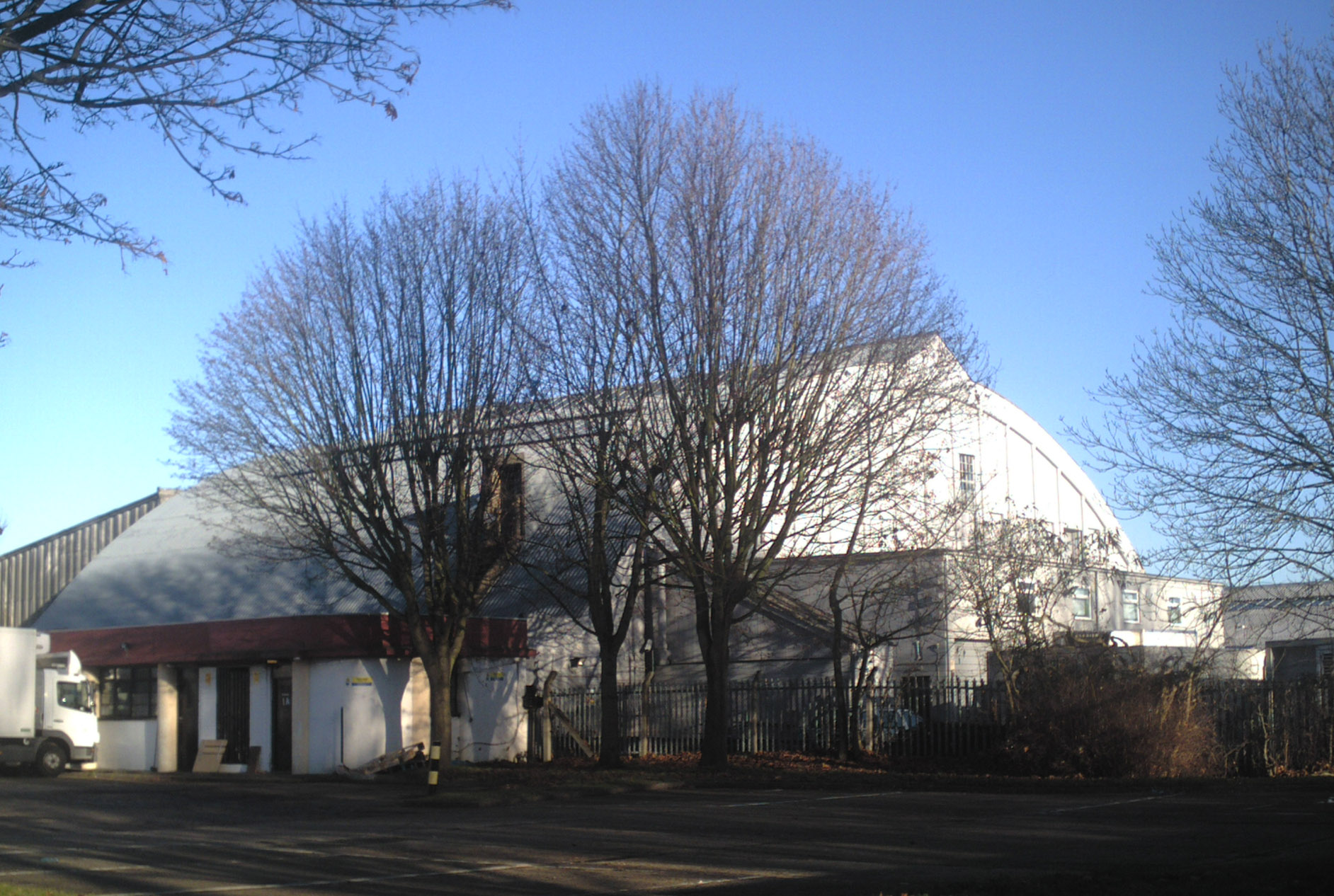
Heston 1929 hangar, looking northeast from Aerodrome Way

Some of what used to be Heston Aerodrome is now used for housing and industrial estates. The M4 motorway and the Heston services cross the site from east to west, and a substantial area to the north of the M4 is part of the Airlinks 18-hole golf course. Many of the roads in the area have aviation-related names, described below. The original tree-lined approach driveway (Aerodrome Way) still exists, and radiating from it, buildings in the original "aircraft" plan-form designed to resemble an arrow pointing north. Only one complete building remains, the hangar built by A. Jackaman & Sons, and once topped with a large Airwork logo illuminated sign. In 1929, it was the first concrete hangar in the UK and, in 2009, was given Grade II listed building status.

Road Name	Referring to:
Alcock Road	Sir John Alcock, who with Arthur Brown, made the first non-stop flight over the Atlantic in 1919.
Bleriot Road	Louis Blériot, first person to fly over the English Channel in 1909.
Brabazon Road	Lord Brabazon, Minister of Transport and Minister of Aircraft Production during Second World War.
Cobham Road	Sir Alan Cobham, British aviation pioneer.
de Havilland Road	Geoffrey de Havilland, British aviation pioneer and aircraft designer.
Johnson Road	Amy Johnson, first woman to fly solo from Britain to Australia in 1930.
Norman Crescent	Nigel Norman, founder of Norman and Dawbarn, responsible for designs of buildings and lay-outs of many municipal airports.
Pegg Road	Bill Pegg, chief test pilot of the Bristol Aeroplane Company, builders of the Bristol Type 167 Brabazon.
Sopwith Road	Sir Thomas Sopwith, British aviation pioneer. Road named during his lifetime.
Whittle Road	Sir Frank Whittle, inventor of the turbojet engine. Road named during his lifetime.
Wright Road	Wright Brothers, U.S. aviation pioneers.
