= 1980 in aviation =

This is a list of aviation-related events from 1980.

== Events ==
- British West Indian Airlines merges with Trinidad and Tobago′s flag carrier Trinidad and Tobago Air Services and becomes the country's new flag carrier, BWIA International Airways.
- Ballistic Recovery Systems is founded.
- Summer 1980 – The British Aerospace Sea Harrier enters operational service with the Fleet Air Arm, providing the British Royal Navy with its first high-performance fixed-wing aircraft capability since the retirement of the aircraft carrier HMS Ark Royal in December 1978.

=== January ===
- January 7 – Pan American World Airways completes its acquisition of National Airlines, taking control of National's assets and routes. National Airlines formally will cease to exist on October 26.
- January 8 – A Mooney 231 lands in San Francisco, after flying coast-to-coast non-stop across the continental United States, setting a record by completing the flight in 8 hours and 4 minutes.
- January 10 – A Cessna 441 Conquest II en route from Shreveport to Baton Rouge, Louisiana ceases communications, flies far off-course on autopilot, and eventually crashes into the Atlantic Ocean off North Carolina due to fuel exhaustion. The two occupants, new Louisiana State University football coach Bo Rein and the pilot, are killed, and are assumed to have lost consciousness in flight due to hypoxia resulting from cabin depressurization.
- January 14 – A Tunisian man hijacks Alitalia Flight 864 – a Douglas DC-9-32 (registration I-DIZI) with 93 people on board flying from Rome, Italy, to Tunis, Tunisia – and forces it to land at Palermo, Sicily. He demands the release of 25 Tunisian prisoners without success, and surrenders after 12 hours of negotiations.
- January 16 – British Island Airways and Air Anglia merge to form Air UK.
- January 18 – A hijacker commandeers a Middle East Airlines Boeing 720 bound from Beirut, Lebanon, to Larnaca, Cyprus, demanding to be flown to Iran. The hijacker surrenders at Beirut.
- January 21 – While on approach to Mehrabad Airport in Tehran, Iran, in fog and snow, an Iran Air Boeing 727-86 crashes in the Alborz Mountains, killing all 128 people on board.
- January 23 – A Pelita Air Service CASA/Nurtanio NC-212 Aviocar 100 (registration PK-PCX) on descent to Jakarta, Indonesia, in bad weather crashes into Mount Cemonyet at an altitude of 2,700 feet (820 meters), killing all 13 people on board.
- January 24 – A Burmese Air Force Fairchild FH-227B suffers an engine failure shortly after takeoff from Mandalay-Annisaton Airport in Mandalay, Burma, strikes the roof of a tobacco factory, and crashes, killing 43 of the 44 people on board and injuring a watchman at the factory.
- January 25 – Armed with a pistol and pretending to have a bomb, a man claiming to be a Black Muslim hijacks Delta Air Lines Flight 1116 – a Lockheed L-1011 Tristar with 63 people on board bound from Atlanta, Georgia to New York City – and forces it to fly to Havana, Cuba. He then demands to be flown to Iran, but eventually surrenders to Cuban authorities. It is the first time since the United States implemented the mandatory security screening of airline passengers nationwide on January 5, 1973, that anyone has smuggled real weapons through the U.S. airport security screening system.
- January 28 – A hijacker commandeers a Middle East Airlines Boeing 720 flying from Baghdad, Iraq, to Beirut, Lebanon, and demands to be allowed to make a political statement. The hijacker surrenders at Beirut.
- January 30 – Two hijackers take control of an Interflug Ilyushin Il-18 during a domestic flight in East Germany from Erfurt to East Berlin but are taken down.

=== February ===
- An Aeroflot Ilyushin Il-18 flies 30,000 km (19,000 mi) from Moscow in the Soviet Union to the Molodyozhnaya Station observatory in East Antarctica.
- One year after the Iranian Revolution, repeated purges of the Iranian armed forces have led to the loss of 25 to 50 percent of majors and field-grade officers of the Iranian Air Force and Iranian Army.
- February 21 – Australia experiences its first fatal airline accident since 1968 when an Advance Aviation Beechcraft King Air 200 suffers the failure of an engine shortly after takeoff from Sydney Airport in Mascot, Australia, due to water in the fuel tank and crashes into a seawall while trying to return to the airport. All 13 people on board die.
- February 23 – Trying to avoid a bicyclist or pedestrian on the runway during its takeoff run at Kheria Air Force Station in Agra, India, an Indian Air Force Fairchild C-119G Flying Boxcar stalls, crashes, and bursts into flames, killing 46 of the 47 people on board.
- February 27 – A China Airlines Boeing 707 originating from Taipei crash-lands in Manila, the Philippines, and is destroyed by fire. All 124 passengers and 11 crew members survive.
- February 28 – A Guatemalan Air Force Douglas C-47 Skytrain carrying Guatemalan Army officers and their families on an excursion to Poptún, Guatemala, crashes in a mountainous region 65 kilometers (40 miles) from Poptún, killing all 31 people on board.

=== March ===
- March 10 – A hijacker commandeers a Middle East Airlines Boeing 707 flying from Amman, Jordan, to Beirut, Lebanon, and demands to be allowed to make a political statement. The hijacker surrenders at Beirut.
- March 12–14 – Two United States Air Force B-52 Stratofrotresses make a non-stop round-the-world flight in 42.5 hours
- March 14
  - One of the fuel tanks of a United States Air Force Lockheed C-130H Hercules explodes while it is on approach to Incirlik Air Base in Adana, Turkey, and it crashes 15 kilometers (9.3 miles) west of the base, killing all 18 people on board.
  - The Ilyushin Il-62 Mikołaj Kopernik, operating as LOT Flight 7, crashes into the moat of a military fortress near Okęcie Airport in Warsaw, Poland, as the crew attempts a go around after a mechanical failure forces them to abort a landing. All 87 people on board die, including Polish singer Anna Jantar, American ethnomusicologist Alan P. Merriam, and a contingent of the United States amateur boxing team.
- March 19 – Pudahuel International Airport in Pudahuel, outside Santiago, Chile, is renamed Arturo Merino Benítez International Airport.
- March 20
  - A CAAC Airlines Antonov An-24RV on a domestic flight in the People's Republic of China from Guiyang to Changsha crashes near Changsha Huanghua Airport, killing all 26 people on board.
  - A hijacker takes control of an Aeroflot Tupolev Tu-134 during a domestic flight in the Soviet Union from Baku to Yerevan, demanding to be flown to Turkey. The hijacker is taken down.
- March 27 – A Lufkin Industries Beechcraft 200 Super King Air crashes in an open field north of Parker, Colorado, about 13 miles (21 km) east of Arapahoe County Airport, due to icing of its airframe, killing all 10 people on board.
- March 28 – The 1,000th production Learjet is delivered.
- March 31 – The U.S. Air Force inactivates the Aerospace Defense Command.

=== April ===
- Due to the increasing price of jet fuel, East Germany's national airline, Interflug, makes its last domestic flight, a flight from East Berlin to Erfurt. Henceforth, Interflug offers only international service.
- April 3 – The prototype of the Bombardier Challenger 600 series crashes in the Mojave Desert in California, killing its pilot.
- April 9
  - In response to an assassination attempt against Iraqi Foreign Minister Tariq Aziz by the pro-Iranian Shiite Muslim group Al Dawaa, the Iraqi Air Force bombs the Iranian town of Qasr-e Shirin on the Iran–Iraq border.
  - As American Airlines Flight 348 – a Boeing 727 with seven crew members on board – prepares to board 74 passengers at Ontario International Airport in Ontario, California, for a flight to Chicago, Illinois, a man armed with a.45-caliber pistol appears on the tarmac, forces his way up the stairs, and hijacks the plane, demanding to be flown to Havana, Cuba. With only the crew and hijacker aboard, the plane flies to Dallas, Texas, to refuel and then on to Havana, where the hijacker is arrested by Cuban authorities.
- April 12 – On a night approach to Hercilio Luz International Airport in Florianópolis, Brazil, during a severe thunderstorm, Transbrasil Flight 303, a Boeing 727-27C, crashes into a hill, killing 55 of the 58 people on board.
- April 14 – At Stapleton International Airport in Denver, Colorado, a hijacker commandeers Continental Airlines Flight 11, a Boeing 727 with 78 people on board bound for Ontario, California.
- April 18 – Air Zimbabwe is formed in Zimbabwe.
- April 24 – To rescue 52 Americans held hostage in Tehran, Iran, during the Iran hostage crisis, the United States Armed Forces mount Operation Eagle Claw, an attempt to carry United States Army Delta Force rescue team to Tehran in eight United States Navy RH-53D Sea Stallion helicopters crewed by United States Marine Corps personnel flying from the aircraft carrier USS Nimitz (CVN-68) in the Persian Gulf. The plan requires the helicopters to meet six United States Air Force aircraft – three special operations MC-130E Combat Talon I penetration/transport aircraft and three EC-130E Hercules – on the ground at the secret "Desert One" airstrip inside Iran for refueling. After only six of the helicopters arrive at Desert One and one of them proves mechanically incapable of continuing, the operation is aborted and, as the aircraft prepare to leave, an RH-53 crashes into an EC-130, killing eight men and destroying both aircraft. The five surviving helicopters are abandoned and all the surviving personnel evacuate Desert One in the remaining MC-130s and EC-130s.
- April 25 – Dan-Air Flight 1008, a Boeing 727-46, turns the wrong way in a holding pattern and crashes into high terrain while on approach to Tenerife North Airport on the island of Tenerife in Spain's Canary Islands, killing all 146 people on board. It is the largest loss of life aboard an aircraft registered in the United Kingdom.
- April 27 – Thai Airways Flight 231, a Hawker Siddeley HS 748, crashes after entering a thunderstorm while on approach to Don Mueang International Airport in Bangkok, Thailand, killing 44 of the 53 people on board and injuring all nine survivors.

=== May ===
- May 1
  - A United States Marine Corps AV-8A Harrier crashes spectacularly at Marine Corps Air Station Cherry Point in North Carolina. During a vertical takeoff the aircraft rolls, drops to the runway, bounces into a ditch, bursts into flames, flips, and slides through a hangar and into a parking lot, where it damages more than 20 vehicles.
  - A hijacker commandeers Pacific Southwest Airlines Flight 818, a Boeing 727 flying from Stockton to Los Angeles, California, with eight people on board. The hijacker demands to be taken to Iran, but is overpowered by the pilot.
- May 6 – A hijacker takes control of a TAP Air Portugal Boeing 727-172C during a domestic flight in Portugal from Lisbon to Faro and demands to be taken to Switzerland. The airliner diverts to Madrid, Spain, where the hijacker surrenders.
- May 8–12 – Maxie Anderson and his son, Kristian Anderson, make the first nonstop balloon crossing of North America, flying from Fort Baker in California to Sainte-Félicité, Queboon.
- May 26 – Encountering a severe thunderstorm, a Nigerian Air Force Fokker F27 Friendship 400M carrying a 12-man Nigerian military delegation on a defence diplomatic mission to São Tomé and Principe crashes in the Atlantic Ocean off Forçados, Nigeria, killing all 18 people on board. Nigerian Minister of External Affairs Abubakar Usman is among the dead.
- May 28 – A Spanish Air Force Lockheed C-130H Hercules crashes into the cloud-covered mountain Hoya del Gamonal on Las Palmas in the Canary Islands, killing all 10 people on board.

=== June ===
- European Helicopter Industries is formed.
- Braniff International Airways ends its Concorde service. Inaugurated in January 1979, it involved an interchange service allowing the Concorde to operate over the United States by having Air France and British Airways crews fly the aircraft from Europe to Washington Dulles International Airport in Virginia outside Washington, D.C., where the aircraft were temporarily leased and re-registered to Braniff and flown by Braniff crews as Braniff aircraft to Dallas-Fort Worth Regional Airport. The process was reversed on the return trip, with Braniff crews flying the planes as Braniff aircraft to Washington Dulles, where they were "sold" back and re-registered to Air France and British Airways before being flown back to Europe by French and British crews. Braniff finds that its Concordes generally carry only 15 passengers per trip (about 20 percent of capacity) on the Dallas-Washington route, in sharp contrast to its Boeing 727s, which are full on the same route, and thus decides to discontinue its Concorde operations. Braniff is the only American airline ever to operate the Concorde.
- June 1 – Mauro Milhomem, a Brazilian pilot, attempted to crash his Sertanejo-721 into the Hotel Presidente owned by his mother-in-law, after he had an argument with his wife the previous day after he discovered that she cheated him. The plane failed to hit the target and hit into several objects and ultimately crashed into an accounting office in front to a forum. Six people were killed and four were wounded.
- June 2 – A Lloyd Aéreo Boliviano Fairchild F-27J (registration CP-1117) crashes in the Tapecua Hills near Yacuíba in southern Bolivia, killing all 13 people on board.
- June 8 – A MiG-19 (NATO reporting name "Farmer") shoots down a TAAG Angola Airlines Yakovlev Yak-40K (registration D2-TYC) near Matala, Angola, killing all 19 people on board. Some reports identify the attacking aircraft as a Zambian Shenyang F-6.
- June 12
  - Badly off course after a long detour around a thunderstorm, an Aeroflot Yakovlev Yak-40 (registration CCCP-87689) attempting to descend toward Dushanbe in the Soviet Union's Tajik Soviet Socialist Republic crashes into a mountain slope 44 kilometers northwest of Dushanbe Airport, killing all 29 people on board.
  - On approach to Lincoln Municipal Airport in Lincoln, Nebraska, Air Wisconsin Flight 965, a Swearingen SA226-TC Metro II (registration N650S) enters an area of very heavy precipitation. Water ingestion causes both engines to lose power simultaneously. The crew restarts them, but the aircraft crashes in a muddy field about 5 kilometers (3.1 miles) north of Valley, Nebraska, killing 13 of the 15 people on board.
- June 13 – The last Concorde to be produced, number 16, is delivered to British Airways.
- June 19 – Sikorsky Aircraft delivers the last of its S-61 commercial helicopters.
- June 23 – Piloting a new aerobatic biplane of the Delhi Flying Club, Sanjay Gandhi, the son of Prime Minister of India Indira Gandhi, loses control at the top of a loop he is performing over his office near Safdarjung Airport in New Delhi, India. He and his passenger die in the subsequent crash.
- June 27 – Itavia Flight 870, a McDonnell Douglas DC-9-15, crashes in the Tyrrhenian Sea near the Italian island of Ustica, killing all 81 people on board. Various theories have been put forward suggesting that the airliner was destroyed in flight by a bomb or was accidentally shot down during a military operation.
- June 30 – A hijacker commandeers an Aerolineas Argentinas Boeing 737-287C during a domestic flight in Argentina from Mar del Plata to Buenos Aires, demanding ransom money.

=== July ===
- July 6 – The largest light airplane meet outside the United States brings 750 small planes to the Popular Flying Association's annual meeting in Leicester, England.
- July 7 – An Instituto Mexicano de Seguridad Social Embraer EMB-110P1 Bandeirante air ambulance (registration XA-DAK) carrying 10 patients, a nurse, and a crew of two crashes into a hill three minutes after takeoff from Tepic Airport in Tepic, Mexico, killing everyone on board.
- July 8 – Aeroflot Flight 4225, a Tupolev Tu-154B-2 (registration CCCP-85355), gets caught in a downdraft two minutes after takeoff from Alma-Ata Airport in Alma-Ata in the Soviet Union's Kazakh Soviet Socialist Republic. It stalls, strikes a farm, crashes in a wheat field, disintegrates, catches fire, and falls into a ravine 5 kilometers (3.1 miles) from the airport, killing all 166 people on board. At the time, it is the deadliest accident involving a Tu-154, the deadliest aviation accident in the history of Kazakhstan, and the second-deadliest aviation accident in the history of the Soviet Union.
- July 11 – At Seattle-Tacoma International Airport outside Seattle, Washington, 18-year-old Glenn Kurt Tripp hijacks Northwest Orient Airlines Flight 608 – a Boeing 727 with 64 people on board bound for Portland, Oregon – and demands a US$600,000 ransom, two parachutes, and the assassination of his boss. After a 10-hour standoff, police storm the plane and arrest Tripp. While on probation, he will hijack the same flight in January 1983.
- July 12 – In the Philippines, a hijacker commandeers a Philippine Air Lines Boeing 727 bound from Manila to Cebu, demanding a ransom and to be flown to Libya. At Manila International Airport, security forces storm the plane and arrest the hijacker.
- July 17
  - Cathay Pacific begins a Hong Kong-London service
  - A Vickers Viscount of the charter airline Alidair lands safely in Devon, England, after suffering damage to all four engines.
- July 21 – The General Dynamics F-16 is officially named the "Fighting Falcon" in a ceremony at Hill Air Force Base, Utah.
- July 22 – A hijacker describing himself as a Puerto Rican man with "personal problems" draws a small pistol and grabs a stewardess aboard Delta Air Lines Flight 1135 – a Lockheed L-1011 Tristar with 158 people on board flying from Miami, Florida, to San Juan, Puerto Rico – about 200 miles (320 km) into its flight, demanding to be flown to Havana, Cuba. Bad weather at Havana forces the airliner to land at Camagüey, Cuba, instead, where the hijacker surrenders to the Cuban authorities and is arrested. The plane then returns to Miami.
- July 24 – Two hijackers take control of a Kuwait Airways Boeing 737-269 (registration 9K-ACV) during a flight from Beirut, Lebanon, to Kuwait City, Kuwait, and demand a ransom. After the plane lands at Kuwait City, they force it to fly to Manama, Bahrain, back to Kuwait City, to Abadan, Iran, and back to Kuwait City again before surrendering to Kuwaiti authorities.

=== August ===
- August 7 – Janice Brown pilots the MacCready Gossamer Penguin on its first solar-powered flight.
- August 10 – A man who had arrived in the United States from Cuba as a refugee during the Mariel boatlift earlier in the year hijacks Air Florida Flight 4 – a Boeing 737 with 35 people on board flying from Miami to Key West, Florida – claiming to have a bomb and forces it to fly him to Havana, Cuba, where he surrenders to Cuban authorities. His "bomb" turns out to be a bar of soap packed in a box.
- August 11 – The construction of São Paulo–Guarulhos International Airport in São Paulo, Brazil, begins.
- August 13 – Complaining that they had been unable to find jobs in the United States, seven man who had arrived in the United States from Cuba as refugees during the Mariel boatlift earlier in the year hijack Air Florida Flight 707 – a Boeing 737 with 74 people on board flying from Key West to Miami, Florida – splashing gasoline (petrol) on the floor and threatening to ignite it. They force it to fly to Havana, Cuba, where they surrender to Cuban authorities. Thirty-nine-year-old passenger Martin Thomas makes his second unplanned trip to Havana in three days; he also had been aboard Air Florida Flight 4 when it was hijacked three days earlier.
- August 14
  - Two Spanish-speaking men armed with a bottle of what appears to be gasoline (petrol) hijack National Airlines Flight 872 – a Douglas DC-10 with 224 people on board flying from Miami, Florida, to San Juan, Puerto Rico – and force it to fly them to Havana, Cuba, where they surrender to Cuban authorities. After four hours on the ground in Havana, the DC-10 takes off early on August 15 and continues its flight to San Juan.
  - Representatives of 17 airlines meet with officials of the U.S. Federal Bureau of Investigation, U.S. Federal Aviation Administration, and the Public Safety Department of Dade County, Florida, to discuss ways of addressing the new wave of airliner hijackings from the United States to Cuba, which began on June 12, 1979. The renewed use of "behavioral profiles" to identify hijackers based on their personalities and behaviors is among the options they consider.
- August 16 – A record three hijackings of U.S. airliners take place on the same day. First, six Latin men threatening to ignite a fluid they said was explosive commandeer Eastern Air Lines Flight 90, a Boeing 727 with 53 people on board flying from Miami to Orlando, Florida. Later in the afternoon, four Latin men armed with bottles they say contain inflammable liquids take control of Republic Airlines Flight 228, a Douglas DC-9 with 116 people on board flying from Miami to Orlando. A half-hour after that, three Latin men threaten to ignite four containers they say contain gasoline (petrol) aboard Delta Air Lines Flight 1065, a Lockheed L-1011 Tristar with 183 people on board flying from San Juan, Puerto Rico, to Miami. All three airliners divert to Havana, Cuba, where Cuban authorities arrest all of the hijackers. In addition, two men armed with bottles containing gasoline are arrested at Miami International Airport in Miami while trying to board an Air Florida flight to Key West. Sky marshals have begun flying aboard airliners flying to and from airports in South Florida during the weeken of August 16–17 to combat the wave of hijackings to Cuba.
- August 18 – A hijacker commandeers Eastern Air Lines Flight 348 – a Douglas DC-9 with 59 people on board flying from Melbourne, Florida, to Atlanta, Georgia – demanding ransom money and to be flown Cuba. Police storm the airliner at Atlanta and arrest the hijacker.
- August 19 – A fire breaks out in the aft cargo compartment of Saudia Flight 163, a Lockheed L-1011-200 TriStar, a few minutes after takeoff from Riyadh, Saudi Arabia. The plane returns to the airport and makes a safe emergency landing, but instead of ordering an immediate emergency evacuation, the flight crew taxis onto a taxiway before stopping. Engine shutdown takes another 3 minutes 15 seconds, by which time all or most of the passengers and crew apparently have been overcome by smoke and fire. By the time airport emergency personnel get one of the plane's doors open 23 minutes after engine shutdown, all 301 people on board have died. It remains the second-deadliest single-aircraft accident in history, the deadliest in Saudi Arabian history, and the deadliest involving an L-1011.
- August 26
  - The right horizontal stabilizer of a Bouraq Indonesia Airlines Vickers 812 Viscount (registration PK-IVS) separates from the aircraft in flight. The airliner crashes in Indonesia 26 kilometers (16 miles) northeast of Jakarta's Kemayoran Airport, killing all 37 people on board.
  - Three hijackers commandeer Eastern Air Lines Flight 401 – a Lockheed L-1011 Tristar with 242 people on board flying from New York City to Miami, Florida – and force it to fly to Havana, Cuba, where they surrender to Cuban authorities.
- August 28–31 – The 3rd FAI World Rally Flying Championship is held in Aschaffenburg, West Germany. Individual winners are 1. Witold Świadek / Andrzej Korzeniowski (Poland), 2. Otto Höfling / Michael Amtmann (West Germany), 3. Luckerbauer / Meszaros (Austria). Team results are 1. Poland, 2. West Germany, 3. Austria.
- August 29 – As passengers board Braniff International Airways Flight 920 – a Douglas DC-8 flying from Rio de Janeiro, Brazil, to Los Angeles, California – during a refueling stop at Jorge Chávez International Airport in Lima, Peru, Cuban refugees break windows in the airport terminal, rush onto the tarmac, and storm the plane, demanding to be flown to the United States. Although Peruvian Civil Guard officers fire shots in the air and prevent some refugees from boarding, 168 refugees join 17 passengers on board the airliner, and about another 150 refugees mill around outside the plane. With no crew aboard the DC-8 to fly it anywhere, negotiations result in the refugees surrendering to the Peruvian authorities. Two refugees suffer minor gunshot wounds during the incident when Civil Guard officers fire at them, and other refugees are cut by broken glass while breaking windows in the terminal.

=== September ===
- September 8 – As Eastern Air Lines Flight 161 – a Boeing 727 with 89 people on board flying from New York City to Tampa, Florida – passes over Charleston, South Carolina, a man – apparently a homesick Cuban refugee – holding a cigarette lighter and a container of liquid threatens to set the airliner on fire if it does not fly him to Cuba, then locks himself in the plane's lavatory. The airliner lands in Havana, Cuba, where Cuban soldiers arrest the hijacker. The plane then refuels and continues its flight to Tampa. It is the eighth hijacking of a U.S. airliner, and the third of an Eastern Air Lines plane, to Cuba since August 10.
- September 9 – Island Air begins operations in Hawaii.
- September 12
  - Florida Commuter Airlines Flight 65, a Douglas DC-3A, crashes in the Atlantic Ocean near West End Settlement, Grand Bahama Island, Bahamas, killing all 34 people on board. Fifteen bodies are recovered before search-and-rescue operations cease on September 15.
  - A hijacker commandeers Eastern Air Lines Flight 5 – a Boeing 727 with 85 people on board flying from Newark, New Jersey, to Miami, Florida – but is taken down.
- September 13 – Two Cuban refugees, brothers Miguel Aguiar Rodriguez and Roberto Aguiar Rodriguez, who had arrived in the United States earlier in 1980 during the Mariel boatlift, hijack Delta Air Lines Flight 334 – a Boeing 727 with 88 people on board flying from New Orleans, Louisiana, to Atlanta, Georgia – threatening to ignite bottles of inflammable liquid. They force it to fly to Havana, Cuba, where they are arrested by Cuban authorities. Roberto will die in October 2002, but Miguel will return to the United States illegally in 2000 and finally will be arrested for the hijacking by U.S. authorities when he arrives for an appointment with the U.S. Immigration and Naturalization Service in Miami, Florida, in August 2002.
- September 14
  - A Royal Saudi Air Force Lockheed C-130H Hercules crashes after suffering engine failure on takeoff from Prince Mohammad bin Abdulaziz Airport in Medina, Saudi Arabia, killing all 89 people on board.
  - A Zaire Air Force Lockheed C-130H Hercules crashes while attempting to takeoff from Kindu Airport in Kindu, Zaire, on three engines at maximum gross takeoff weight, killing all 36 people on board.
- September 17 – A Zaire Air Force de Havilland Canada DHC-5D Buffalo crashes at Kindu Airport in Kindu, Zaire, killing 36 people.
- September 19 – The Islamic Republic of Iran Air Force admits to losing two F-4 Phantom II fighter-bombers during heavy fighting with Iraq over control of the Shatt al-Arab waterway.
- September 21 – A Douglas A-26 Invader crashes during an air show at Biggin Hill in London, England, killing its pilot and seven passengers. The incident prompts the United Kingdom's Civil Aviation Authority to introduce rules prohibiting aircraft from carrying passengers during air shows.
- September 22
  - The Iran–Iraq War begins. The Islamic Republic of Iran Air Force has about 100,000 men and 447 combat aircraft, while the Iranian Army Aviation Corps has about 70 light reconnaissance and support planes and over 200 armed helicopters; only 50–60 percent of Iranian fixed-wing aircraft, 18–50 percent of its combat aircraft, and 60 percent of its helicopters are operational. The Iraqi Air Force has about 38,000 men, of which about 10,000 are air defense personnel, and 332 combat aircraft, and the Iraqi Army Air Corps has about 70 armed helicopters.
  - The Iraqi Air Force begins the war with an attempt to destroy the Iranian Air Force on the ground in a surprise attack, striking the Iranian airfields at Mehrabad, Kermanshah, Sanandaj, and Al-Ahwaz, and the Iranian Army bases at Hamadan, Tehran, Isfahan, Dezful, Shiraz, and Tabriz, but the attacks have little effect.
- September 23–24 – Iraqi aircraft attack Iranian airfields at Tabriz (twice), Dezful (twice), Shahroki, Kermanshah, Al-Ahwaz, and Sanandaj, but again make little impact on Iranian air capabilities. Iranian aircraft fly 100 sorties on September 23 despite the attacks, prompting Iraq ro disperse many of its aircraft into other Arab countries for the next week to ten days.
- September 24 – The Iraqi Air Force attacks Iran's oil terminal at Kharg Island for the first time.
- September 28 – Iraqi Air Force Tupolev Tu-22 (NATO reporting name "Blinder') bombers land in Riyadh, Saudi Arabia, after bombing Iran.
- September 30 – At Saudi Arabia's request, the U.S. Air Force's "ELF-1" force – consisting of four E-3A Sentry Airborne Warning and Control System (AWACS) aircraft, two KC-135 Stratotanker tanker aircraft, and 300 support personnel – arrives at Dhahran International Airport in Saudi Arabia to provide long-range air defense and maritime surveillance support to Saudi and American forces. ELF-1 will remain in Saudi Arabia through the end of the Iran–Iraq War in 1988.

=== October ===
- October 1
  - Republic Airlines completes its buyout of Hughes Airwest.
  - Seaboard World Airlines merges into Flying Tiger Line and disappears as a corporate entity. The merger makes Flying Tiger the largest air cargo carrier.
- October 2 – A Westland Sea King helicopter rescues 22 passengers from the Swedish ship Finneagle in the North Sea.
- October 7 – The Islamic Republic of Iran Air Force attacks Iraqi oil facilities at Kirkuk and Sulaimaniyeh, but inflicts little real damage.
- October 12 – Mesa Airlines commences operations.
- October 16 – Iraqi aircraft destroy Iranian oil tanks at Tehran.
- October 20 – The first dogfights of the Iran–Iraq War take place. Islamic Republic of Iran Air Force F-4 Phantom IIs shoot down an Iraqi Air Force Mikoyan-Gurevich MiG-21.
- October 26 – National Airlines formally ceases to exist. Pan American World Airways already had completed its acquisition of National Airlines on January 7, when it had taken control of National's assets and routes.

=== November ===
- November 4 – A Venezuelan Air Force Lockheed C-130H Hercules crashes during its initial climb after takeoff from Simón Bolívar International Airport in Caracas, Venezuela, killing all six people on the plane and five people on the ground.
- November 9 – Dan-Air registers the last commercial flight by a de Havilland Comet. The plane flies enthusiasts on a round-trip flight from London Gatwick Airport.
- November 12
  - Turning onto final approach after a night go-around at Cairo West Air Base in Cairo, Egypt, a United States Air Force Lockheed C-141B Starlifter crashes, killing all 13 people on board.
  - Delta Air Lines orders 60 Boeing 757s, the largest single order to this time for a single airliner type.
- November 19 – Korean Airlines Flight 015, a Boeing 747-2B5B (registration HL7445) carrying 212 people, lands 90 meters (300 feet) short of the runway at Kimpo International Airport in Seoul, South Korea, and strikes an embankment. Its main landing gear collapses backward and penetrates its cargo compartment, where sparks start a fire while the plane slides down the runway on its nose gear and belly. The fire quickly guts the fuselage, killing 15 people, but the rest of the passengers and crew evacuate and survive. Four of the survivors are seriously injured.
- November 21 – Continental Micronesia, a Boeing 727-92C, skids off the runway and crashes when its right main landing gear separates from the airliner as it lands at Yap International Airport on Yap in the western Caroline Islands. A fire subsequently destroys the plane, but all 73 people on board evacuate, three of them with serious injuries.
- November 24 – Flying in heavy rain, a Douglas C-47A-35-DL Skytrain (registration HK-1221G) operated by Colombia's customs service crashes into the mountain Cerro El Boquerón near Murri, Colombia, at an altitude of 9,500 feet (2,900 meters), killing all 20 people on board.
- November 25 – U.S. Navy helicopters join U.S. Air Force and U.S. Army units in providing aid to victims of an earthquake at Avellino, Italy, which had killed 3,000 and left many people homeless two days earlier.

=== December ===
- Thanks to purges of officers since the February 1979 Iranian Revolution and the Western embargo on spare parts shipments to Iran, by late 1980 the operational level of the Islamic Republic of Iran Air Force drops below 100 aircraft and its sustained sortie rate to drop to one per day. This will not change through the end of the Iran–Iraq War in 1988. The Iranian Army helicopter force, able to fly 60 to 70 percent of its helicopters, suffers from similar problems.
- December 4 – Prime Minister of Portugal Francisco de Sá Carneiro and Portuguese Minister of National Defence Adelino Amaro da Costa die in the crash of a Cessna 421A Golden Eagle in Camarate, Portugal. The other five people on board also die.
- December 7 – The Pan American World Airways Boeing 747 China Clipper arrives in Beijing, China, from John F. Kennedy International Airport in New York after a stop in Tokyo, Japan. It marks the first time since 1949 that a commercial flight between the United States and mainland China is completed.
- December 19 – New York Air begins airline operations.
- December 21 – An explosion occurs in the right rear portion of a TAC Colombia Sud Aviation SE-210 Caravelle VIN (registration HK-1810) on its first scheduled flight after 17 months of maintenance work shortly after takeoff from Almirante Padilla Airport in Riohacha, Colombia. It crashes, killing all 70 people on board.
- December 22 – Saudia Flight 162, a Lockheed L-1011 TriStar with 292 people on board, suffers an explosive decompression over the Persian Gulf off Qatar, killing two people and injuring seven.
- December 24 – The Iraqi Air Force makes its first major air raid against the Iranian oil terminal at Kharg Island.

== First flights ==
=== March ===
- March 14 – Grob G 109
- March 28 – Rolladen-Schneider LS4

=== April ===
- April 9 – Akaflieg Braunschweig SB-12

=== May ===
- May 10 – Glasflügel 304
- May 13 – Antonov An-3

=== June ===
- June 4 – Mitsubishi F-15J
- June 20 – Beechcraft Commuter
- June 24 – Microturbo Microjet 200 F-WZJF

=== July ===
- July 1 - QAC Quickie Q2
- July 12 – McDonnell Douglas KC-10 Extender 79-0433
- July 16 – British Aerospace Nimrod AEW3
- July 21 – Caproni Vizzola Ventura
- July 23 – Eurocopter HH-65 Dolphin

=== August ===
- August 11 – Learjet Longhorn 50
- August 16 – EMBRAER Tucano 1300
- August 19 – Boeing-Vertol Model 234

=== September ===
- September 26 – Shanghai Y-10
- September 30 - Monnett Monex

=== October ===
- October 9 - Hoffman H36 Dimona
- October 16 - Pottier P.100
- October 23 - Striplin Lone Ranger

=== November ===
- November 6 – MacCready Solar Challenger
- November 8 - Nash Petrel

=== December ===
- December 2 - Gyroflug Speed Canard
- December 8 – Robin R3140
- December 16 - Glasflügel 402
- December 31 - SZD-51 Junior

== Entered service ==
=== January ===
- Bell Model 222 with Petroleum Helicopters and Schiavone Construction

=== October ===
- The MD-80 series enters airline service.

=== November ===
- November 13 – F/A-18 Hornet with VFA-125 at NAS Lemoore.

=== December ===
- December 26 – Ilyushin Il-86 with Aeroflot

== Retirements ==
- North American F-100 Super Sabre by the United States Air National Guard

== Deadliest crash ==
The deadliest crash of this year is considered an unusual accident: Saudia Flight 163, a Lockheed L-1011 TriStar, caught on fire in the air shortly after departing Riyadh, Saudi Arabia, on 19 August; the aircraft landed and came to a halt near Riyadh's runway but in failing to evacuate promptly, the fire overcame the passengers and crew killing all 301 people on board.
