= Flight 162 =

Flight 162 may refer to:

- Saudia Flight 162, suffered damage on 22/23 December 1980
- Asiana Airlines Flight 162, accident on 14 April 2015
