= FFT Eurotrainer 2000 =

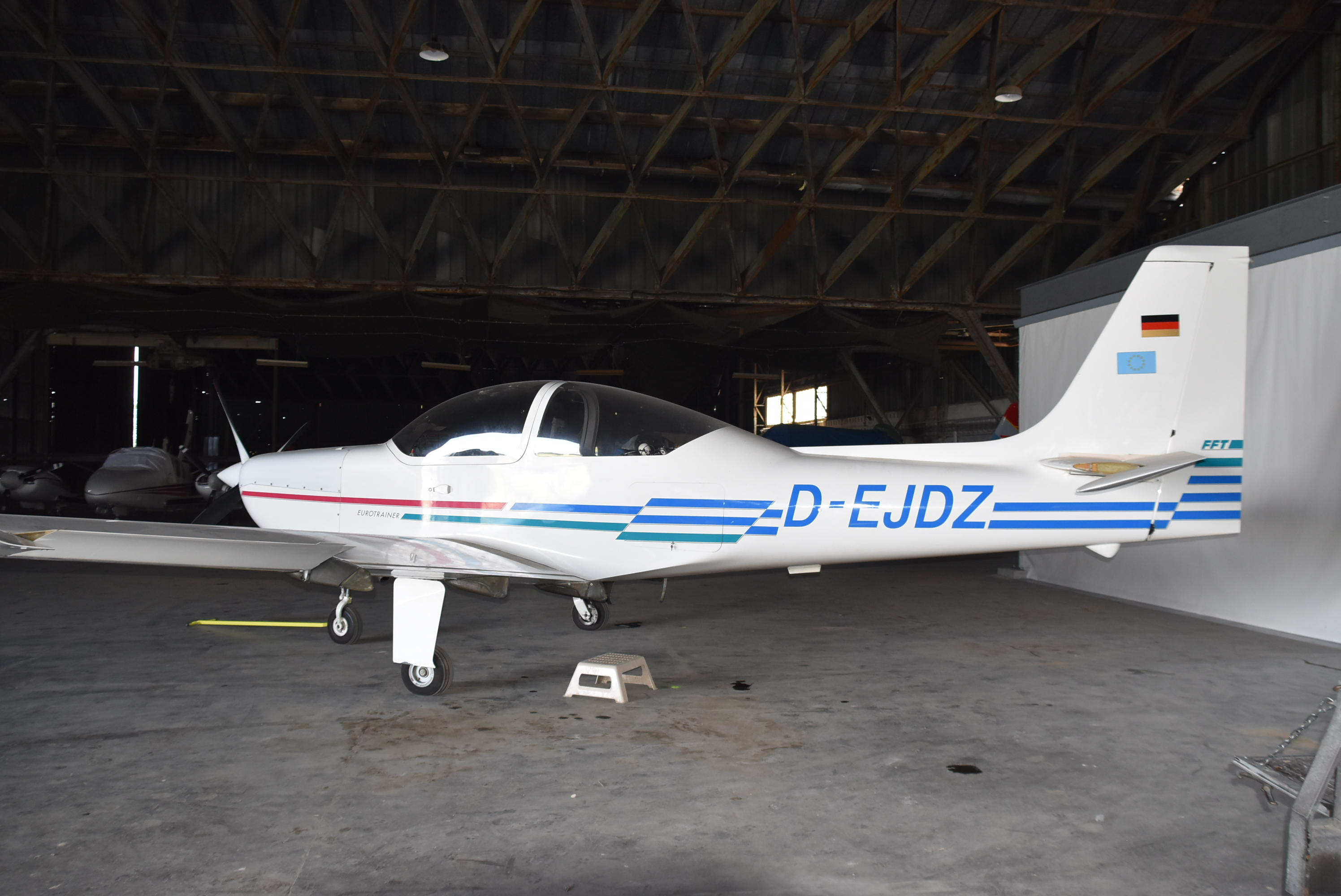

General information
- Type: Trainer
- National origin: Germany
- Manufacturer: Gyroflug, (Flugzeug und Faserverbund Technologie mbH)
- Number built: 1

History
- Developed from: FFA AS-202 Bravo

The FFA 2000, FFT Eurotrainer 2000, Eurotrainer 2000 is a low wing two seat training aircraft developed by Gyroflug. A prototype was tested and displayed throughout Europe, but the project was canceled.

== Development ==
The Eurotrainer 2000 was developed as a modern low cost trainer for military and civilian pilots developed from AS-202 metal design. The first launch customer was to be Swissair. FFT went out of business in 1992 with one prototype produced.

== Design ==
The aircraft is a four-seat, retractable tricycle gear design. The fuselage and wings are all composite construction. The landing gear uses a trailing link layout.

== Operational history ==
The prototype has been displayed in Paris, France in 1991 at Le Bourget airfield.

== Variants ==
FFA 2000
FFA Flugzeugwerke project developed in 1985 with a Porsche PFM 3200-T03 engine. Production delays of Porsche engine prompted switch to Lycoming AEIO-540-X100 engine in 1989.
FFT 2000
Gesellschaft für Flugzeug- und Faserverbund-Technologie mbH version (no differences)
Eurotrainer 2000A
Renamed product

== Specifications (FFT Eurotrainer 2000) ==
Data from Flight International

General characteristics

- Capacity: 4
- Length: 8.10 m (26 ft 7 in)
- Wingspan: 10.4 m (34 ft 1 in)
- Width: 1.15 m (3 ft 9 in)
- Height: 3.2 m (10 ft 6 in)
- Wing area: 14 m^{2} (150 sq ft)
- Empty weight: 920 kg (2,028 lb)
- Max takeoff weight: 1,300 kg (2,866 lb)
- Fuel capacity: 260 liters
- Powerplant: 1 × Lycoming AEIO-540-L , 200 kW (270 hp)
- Propellers: 3-bladed

Performance

- Cruise speed: 324 km/h (201 mph, 175 kn)
- Stall speed: 93 km/h (58 mph, 50 kn)
- Never exceed speed: 417 km/h (259 mph, 225 kn)
- Service ceiling: 7,000 m (23,100 ft)
- Rate of climb: 6.6 m/s (1,300 ft/min)
