= Gyroflug =

German aircraft manufacturer

- Industry: General Aviation
- Headquarters: Hohentengen, West-Germany
- Products: Light Aircraft
- Subsidiaries: Purchased by Justus Dornier Group in 1984

Gyroflug Ingenieurgesellscaft mbh was a German aircraft manufacturer specializing in light aircraft, whose major product was the Gyroflug Speed Canard. It was founded in 1978, but ceased trading in 1992.

== History ==
Gyroflug was founded in August 1978 to build and sell a two-seat canard light aircraft of composite construction, the Gyroflug Speed Canard. The Speed Canard is similar in configuration to the popular American Rutan VariEze, but unlike the homebuilt VariEze, the Canard was intended to be factory built.

The first prototype made its maiden flight on 2 December 1980, with the second prototype following in April 1983. Initial certification followed in September 1983. Gyroflug was acquired by the Justus Dornier Group at the end of 1984, moving from Karlsruhe to Mengen in 1987.

Gyroflug was renamed FFT (Gesellschaft für Flugzeug- und Faserverbund-Technologie mbH) in 1990. It ceased trading on December 31, 1992. A letter to the FAA dated June 23, 1998 confirmed that FFT was defunct.

== Aircraft ==
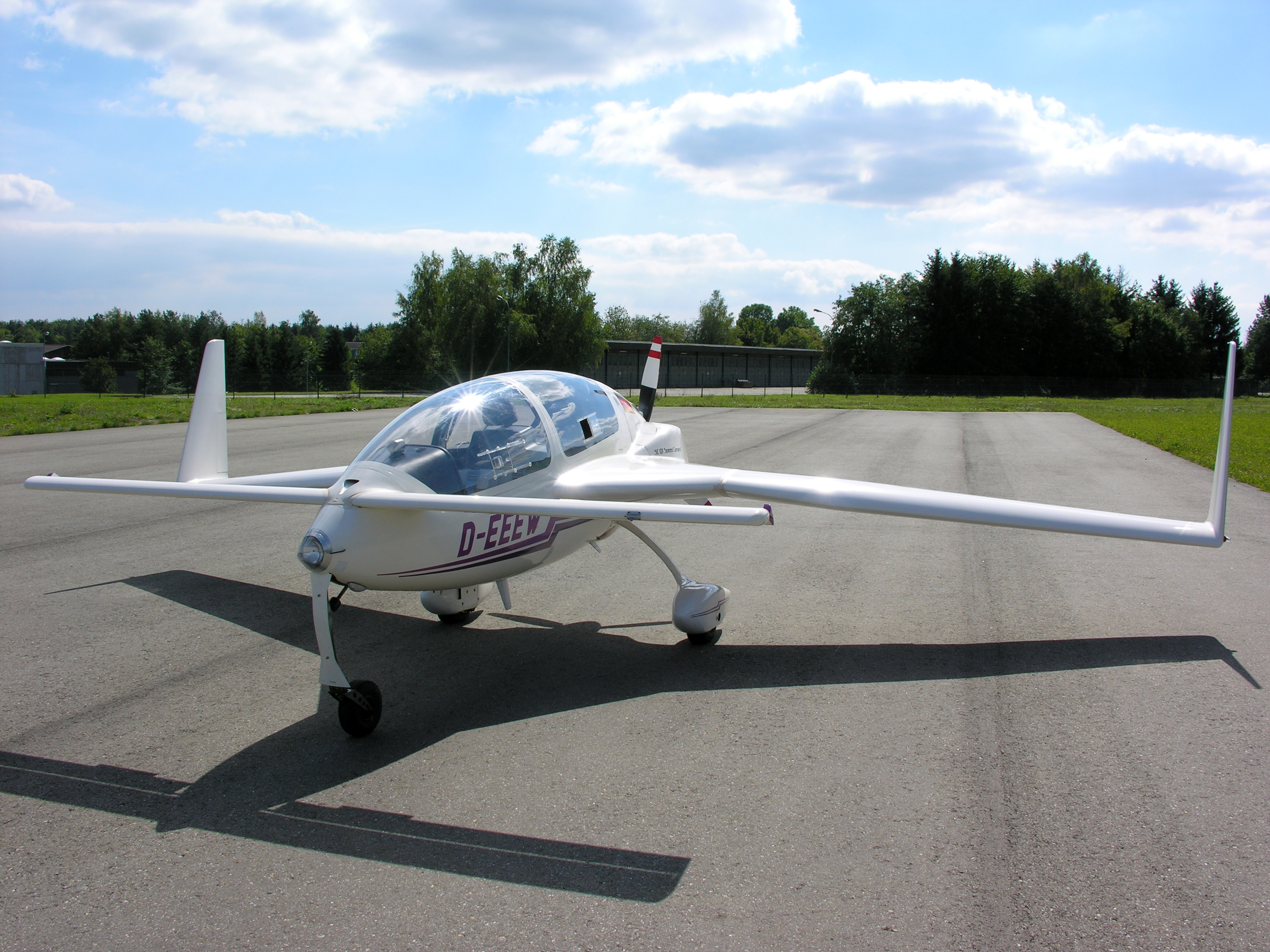
Speed Canard

Summary of aircraft built by Gyroflug
Model name	First flight	Number built	Type
Speed Canard	1980	160	Type
FFT Eurotrainer 2000	1990	1	Type

The Speed Canard was certified in Germany in 1983, and in the United States in 1990. The Eurotrainer 2000 was a single engined four seat light aircraft originally designed by the Swiss company Flug- und Fahrzeugwerke Altenrhein (FFA). Swissair was the launch customer. It first flew on 29 April 1991.
