= FFA AS 202 Bravo =

1969 sportplane family by FFA

AS/SA 202 Bravo
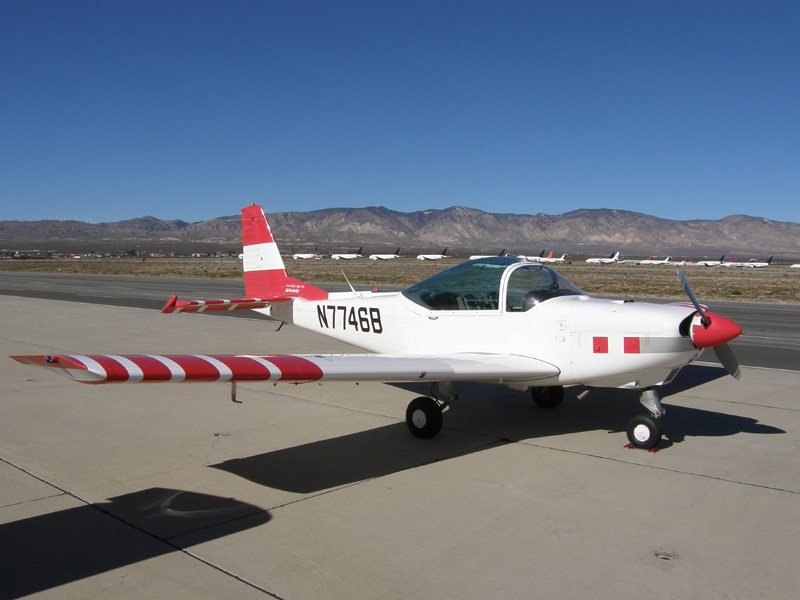

General information
- Type: Civil light aircraft
- National origin: Switzerland/Italy; Germany NG models
- Manufacturer: FFA/SIAI-Marchetti; GOMOLZIG Flugzeug und Maschinenbau
- Status: Active
- Primary users: Indonesian Air Force Ugandan Air Force
- Number built: 214

History
- Manufactured: 1969–1991; 2020-today
- First flight: 9 March 1969
- Retired: Patria Pilot Training 2011
- Variant: FFT Eurotrainer 2000

The AS/SA 202 Bravo is a two to three-seat civil light aircraft jointly designed and manufactured by the Swiss company Flug- und Fahrzeugwerke Altenrhein (FFA) and the Italian company Savoia-Marchetti. The aircraft was designated the AS 202 in Switzerland, and the SA 202 in Italy.

Savoia-Marchetti manufactured the wings, undercarriage and engine installation, while FFA manufactured the fuselage, tail and controls, while both companies had assembly plants manufacturing the complete aircraft.

The first Swiss model flew on 9 March 1969, the first Italian aircraft following on 8 May.

Bravo is a rugged all-metal low-wing monoplane with a full vision canopy. Its tricycle landing gear is fixed.

34 15s and 180 18s were built, with most in service with military customers. The biggest civil operator was Patria Pilot Training at Helsinki-Malmi Airport, Finland during 2000–2011.

== Variants ==
AS/SA 202/10
With 115 hp Lycoming O-235-C2A engine
AS/SA 202/15
With 150 hp Lycoming O-320-E2A engine, fixed pitch propeller, optional third aft seat
AS/SA 202/18A
With 180 hp Lycoming AEIO-360-B1F engine, constant speed propeller, third aft seat, fully aerobatic.
AS/SA 202/26A
With 195 kW (260hp) Lycoming AEIO-540 engine. Only one aircraft was manufactured so far.
AS 32T Turbo Trainer
Two-seat tandem trainer aircraft, powered by a 268 kW (360-hp) Allison 250-B17C turboprop engine. Only one aircraft was manufactured.
FFA 2000 / FFT 2000 / Eurotrainer 2000
Composite derivative
Gomolzig AS-202 BRAVO NG

modern version of the FFA AS 202 Bravo, since 2020

== Operators ==
=== Civil operators ===
- Finland
  - Patria Pilot Training – 7 aircraft in 2000–2011. Patria's Bravos are ex-British Aerospace Flying College aircraft. BAE Flying College owned 11 aircraft, but 1 was lost in Scotland claiming 2 lives. Remaining 10 aircraft were sold to private Finnish flying school Pilot Factory, which merged with Patria in 2004–2005.

7 aircraft out of original 10 remain in service. During merger with Patria, one aircraft was sold to private owner. Night-time accident at Helsinki-Malmi airport in 2002 claimed no lives but hull was damaged beyond repair. In August 2010 one aircraft veered off the runway at Helsinki-Malmi and was written off.

Patria's Bravos were replaced with Tecnam P2002JF.

- Uganda
  - Uganda Central Flying School – 8 aircraft.

=== Military operators ===
- Uganda
  - Ugandan Air Force – 1 aircraft in 2012

=== Former military operators ===
- Indonesia
  - Indonesian Air Force – 40 aircraft. Replaced by G 120TP in 2013 – 2014
- Iraq
  - Iraqi Air Force
- Jordan
  - Royal Jordanian Air Force
- Morocco
  - Royal Moroccan Air Force – 10 aircraft.
  - Royal Air Maroc – 5 aircraft.
- Oman
  - Royal Air Force of Oman
  - Royal Flight of Oman – 4 aircraft.

== Specifications (202/15) ==
Data from Jane's All the World's Aircraft 1976-77

General characteristics

- Crew: 1 or 2
- Length: 7.5 m (24 ft 7 in)
- Wingspan: 9.75 m (32 ft 0 in)
- Height: 2.81 m (9 ft 3 in)
- Wing area: 13.86 m^{2} (149.2 sq ft)
- Airfoil: root: NACA 63_{2}618 modified 17.63%; tip: NACA 63_{2}415 modified 15%
- Empty weight: 630 kg (1,389 lb)
- Max takeoff weight: 885 kg (1,951 lb) (and MLW) aerobatic

999 kg (2,202 lb) (and MLW) utility

- Fuel capacity: 140 L (37.0 US gal; 30.8 imp gal) in two wing leading-edge tanks
- Powerplant: 1 × Lycoming O-320-E2A 4-cylinder air-cooled horizontally-opposed piston engine, 112 kW (150 hp)
- Propellers: 2-bladed McCauley 1C172 MGM, 1.88 m (6 ft 2 in) diameter fixed-pitch propeller

Performance

- Maximum speed: 211 km/h (131 mph, 114 kn) (utility at MTOW) at sea level
- Cruise speed: 211 km/h (131 mph, 114 kn) (utility at MTOW) maximum; 75% power at 2,440 m (8,000 ft)

203 km/h (126 mph; 110 kn) (utility at MTOW) economical; 66% power at 3,050 m (10,000 ft)

- Stall speed: 110 km/h (68 mph, 59 kn) flaps up

89 km/h (55 mph; 48 kn) flaps down

- Never exceed speed: 322 km/h (200 mph, 174 kn) (utility at MTOW)
- Range: 890 km (550 mi, 480 nmi) max fuel no reserve
- Service ceiling: 4,265 m (14,000 ft)
- Rate of climb: 3.22 m/s (633 ft/min)
- Wing loading: 72.2 kg/m^{2} (14.8 lb/sq ft)
- Power/mass: 0.112 kW/kg (0.068 hp/lb)

== See also ==
- Lists of air show accidents and incidents

Related lists

- List of civil aircraft
