= Airports Development Program =

- Date: 1975
- Location: Saudi Arabia
- Type: Infrastructure development
- Cause: 1970s economic growth and outdated pre-existing airports
- Organised by: Saudi Arabian Government
- Outcome: Construction of three international airports

The Airports Development Program was a major national infrastructure project in Saudi Arabia. It was launched in 1975 by the Saudi Arabian Government aimed at replacing three obsolete airports located in Jeddah, Riyadh, and Dammam. The project was aligned with the second Five-Year Plan (1975–1980), with the government amounting billions of dollars in funding for construction.

== Background ==
In the 1970s, Saudi Arabia underwent a significant economic transformation fueled by oil revenues. Due to the rapid growth in domestic and international air travel, and annual Hajj seasons by the late 1970s, the existing international airports in the kingdom were rendered at overcapacity. During the mid-1970s, the government began launching multiple development projects, which were substantially delayed due to the absence of transportation infrastructure. At the time, there were no widespread road networks and modern-equipped airports which could allow the transportation of construction materials. In the kingdom, there were only 3 international airports and 21 domestic airports operating of that era. Jeddah International Airport was located within the city center, while Riyadh International Airport and Dhahran International Airport were surrounded by growing suburbs, which hindered the capabilities to expand all three airports. All of which were originally established close to the cities, following the advent of civil aviation in 1945 when a Douglas DC-3 was gifted by U.S. President Franklin D. Roosevelt. Furthermore, the kingdom’s flag carrier Saudia, had significantly grown in passenger numbers, from 1.8 million in 1975 to 9.5 million in 1980, and 11.6 million by 1984.

== Airports program ==
In the second Five-Year Plan (1975–1980), the Saudi Arabian government began funding infrastructure upgrades which included billions of dollars worth of funding for newer airports. Subsequently, in 1975, the Saudi Arabian government launched the airports program, aimed at building three new international airports to serve Riyadh, Jeddah, and Dhahran. The initiative was part of the kingdom's Third Development Plan, primarily aimed at modernizing its transportation networks. The three projects were managed by International Airport Projects (IAP).

=== Construction phases ===
Jeddah International Airport

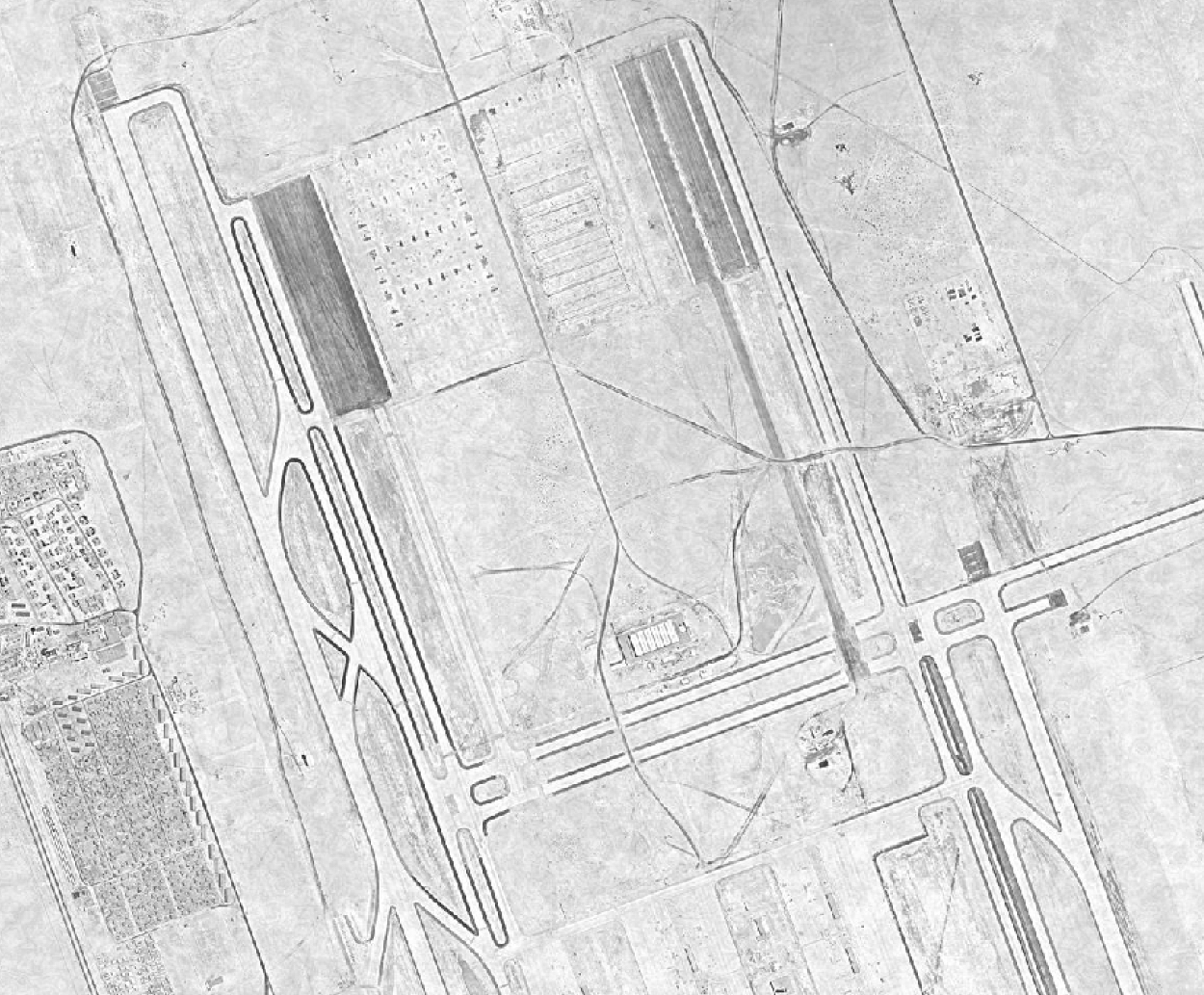
Aerial imagery showing the construction of KAIA on 12 July, 1979.

In 1974, the site of the first international airport was selected north of Jeddah, and construction began in 1975. Spanning 103 square kilometers, the project's estimated cost was US$4.5 billion, and was budgeted at US$5 billion. Construction was managed by the Parsons Corporation in joint venture with Daniel International as a U.S. consortium, and German construction company Hochtief which facilitated the construction of the fabric roof units on the Hajj terminal. Prior to construction of the Hajj Terminal, a $2.5-million prototype testing program was carried out at Owens-Corning Technical Center in Granville, Ohio In May 1979, construction of the Haji terminal began. The construction of the Hajj terminal required 510,967 square meters of teflon-covered fiberglass fabric manufactured from Rhode Island, 440 steel support pylons made from 30,000 tons of rolled from Tsu, Japan, which were transported to Jeddah by barge, and 246 miles of steel cable manufactured from the Beaujolais district of France. During peak construction in 1977, more than 11,000 workers from 35 countries were active on-site. On 12 April, 1981, King Khalid and Prince Fahd inaugurated the new airport, dedicating it to King Abdulaziz. Following inauguration, King Abdulaziz International Airport (KAIA) opened on 31 May, 1981. At opening, the airport was capable of handling up to 150,000 metric tons of freight a year, aircraft arriving at the rate of 100 an hour, and the Hajj Terminal which could handle 80,000 pilgrims a day. Due to its scale, the airport was seen as one of the world's largest at its time.

Riyadh International Airport

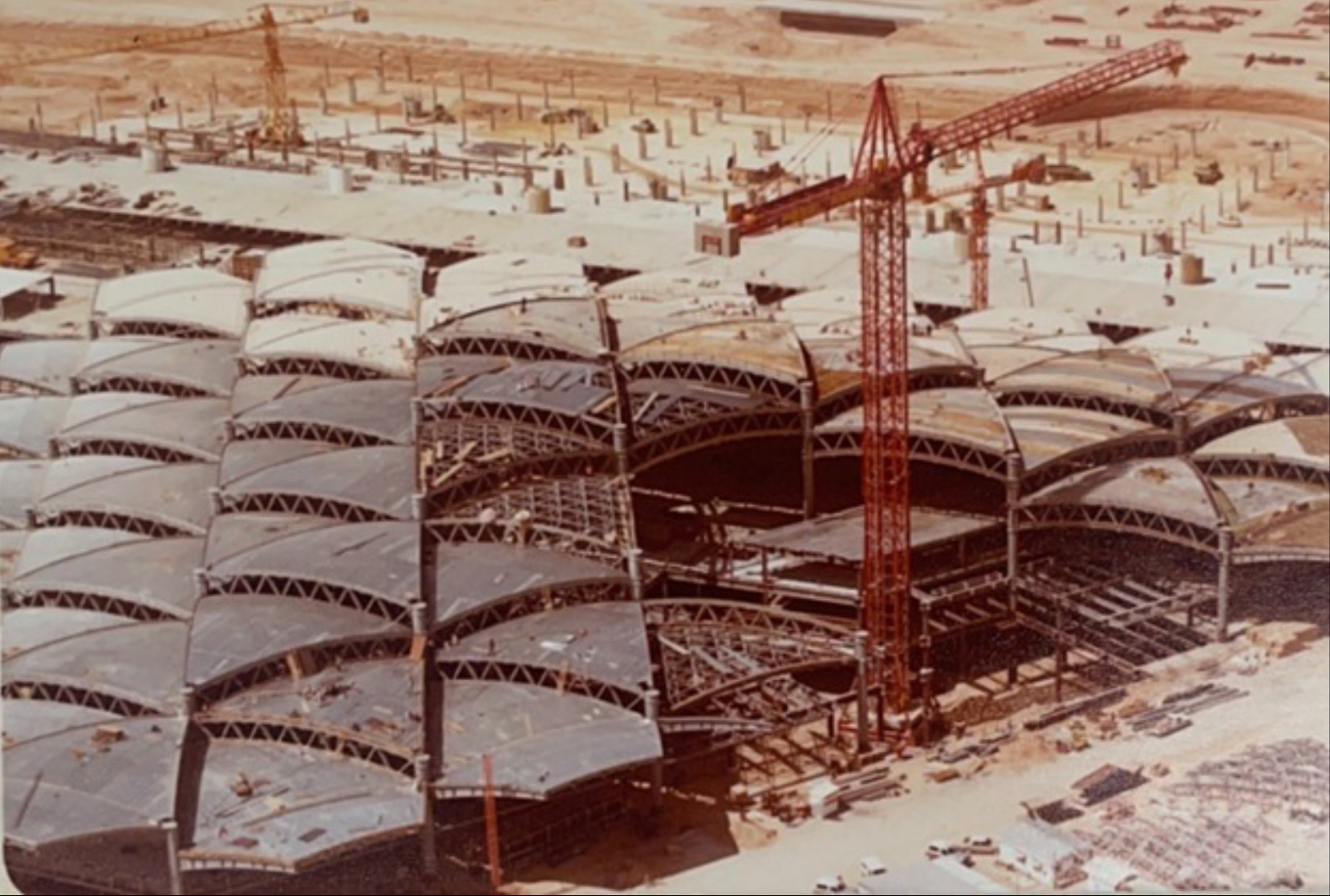
Construction of King Khalid International Airport's main terminal during the mid-1970s.

In 1974, the planning and site selection of the second international airport began. The construction of the project was budgeted at US$3.2 billion, with planning and economic analysis amounting up to "30,000 pages of reports". In 1976, construction of Riyadh International Airport began. During peak construction, 66 separate construction contractors and more than 14,000 workers were active on-site. In order to house workers, Bechtel Saudi Arabia Ltd. constructed a permanent housing facility able to accommodate up to 10,000 workers. Logistics involved thousands of tons of freight globally delivered, including cement from Spain and Greece, structural steel from South Korea and Japan, and wire mesh from Germany. 34 passenger jet bridges manufactured in Texas were also shipped intact on roll-on, roll-off cargo vessels. The airport site measured approximately 225 square kilometers, which was twice the area of Jeddah International Airport. Rock-crushing, asphalt and concrete batch plants, water treatment plants fed by four wells drilled a mile deep, a 700,000-gallon capacity sewage plant, a jet fuel storage and pumping facility, and emergency generators were installed by the construction contractors. In total, the project required 7.8 million concrete blocks, 86,100 metric tons of rebar, more than 7 million tons of aggregate, over 408,000 tons of cement, and 29.6, million cubic meters of earthworks. The airport was also the first in the country to be equipped with travelators. Two parallel runways both measuring 4,600 meters long and 60 meters were built. Facilities included two international and two domestic terminals with a total of 32 gates all equipped with jet bridges, royal pavilion, 135,000 square feet mosque with a capacity of 5,000 worshippers, central administrative complex, general aviation complex, public safety complex, and a covered carpark with a capacity of 7,400 vehicles. On 16 November, 1983, King Khalid International Airport (KKIA) opened. At opening, the airport was capable of handling up to 900 passengers per hour in each terminal, and was expected to handle 15 million passengers per year by 2000. The location of the new airport began attracting development like hotels, government offices, residential areas, and roads, influencing the city of Riyadh to expand northeast.

Dhahran International Airport

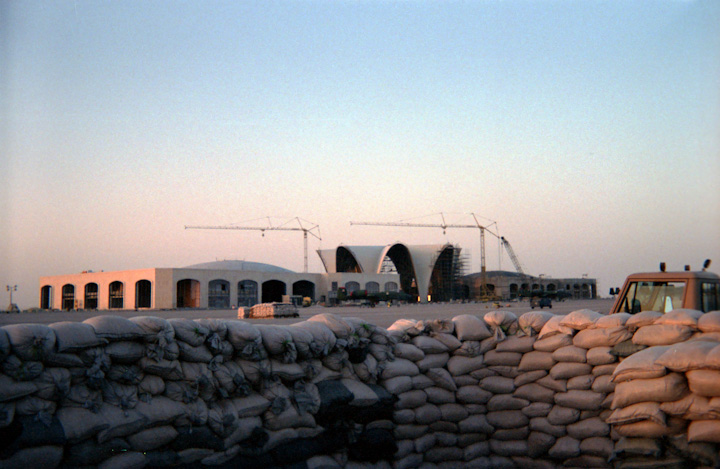
Construction of KFIA's royal terminal taken in 1990–91.

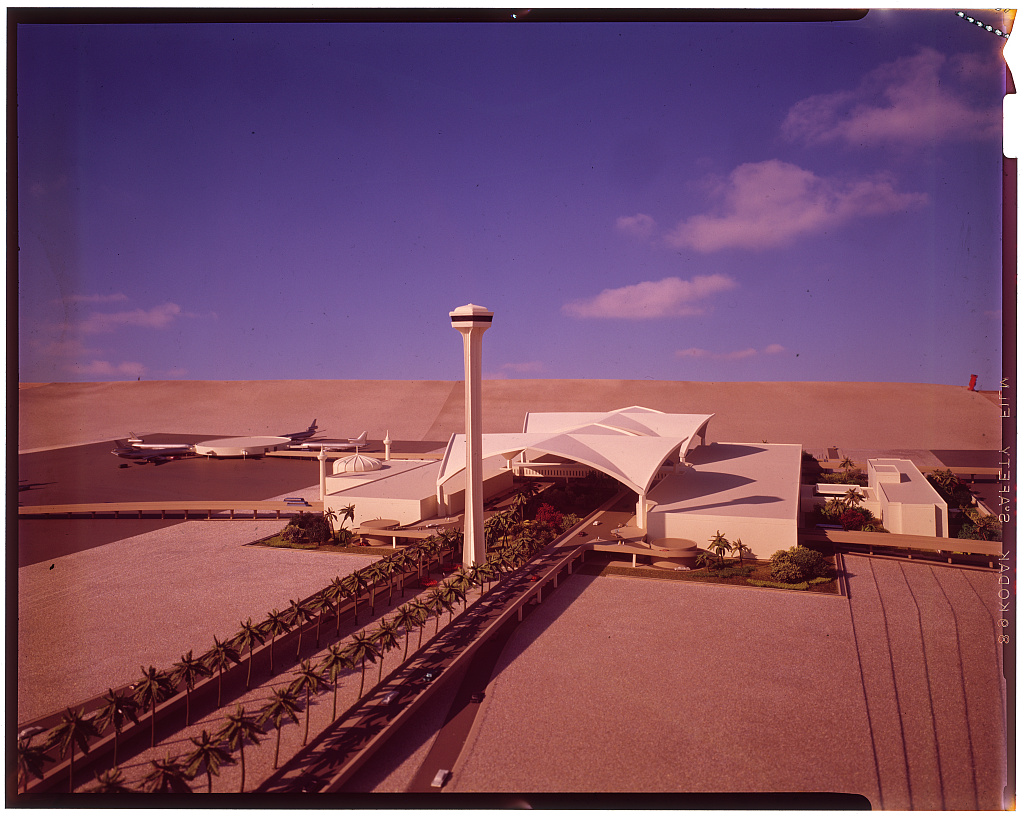
Model of Eastern Province International Airport by Minory Yamasaki

In 1976, the planning of the third and last international began, and a site was selected 30 kilometers northwest of Dammam, which was free of airspace restrictions imposed by the nearby Dhahran International Airport. The site was also located near major highways and expressways, allowing sufficient access. In 1977, a master plan was completed by architecture firm Minoru Yamasaki & Associates and Boeing. At the time, the airport was known as Eastern Province International Airport. In mid-1981, Arabian Bechtel Company Ltd. and Minoru Yamasaki revised and updated the master plan, which led to the preparation of a traffic forecast and revaluation of the passenger terminal. In 1983, construction of the airport began. It was projected to open by 1988, however due to the massive scale of the project, construction work was prolonged. The Gulf War also delayed the opening of the airport, as U.S-led coalition forces occupied the airport in early 1991 for the storage of military aircraft, including 144 A-10 Thunderbolt IIs, among other aircraft such as the AH-64 Apaches and CH-47 Chinooks of the 101st Airborne Division, before operations were transferred to the Ahmad al-Jaber Air Base in Kuwait. King Fahd International Airport was finally opened for civilian operations on 28 November, 1999.

== Aftermath ==
Following the opening of King Abdulaziz International Airport on 31 May, 1981, Jeddah International Airport ceased commercial operations and took two years to fully transfer equipment. At the time of closure, the site of the former airport was planned to be redeveloped into housing. Following the opening of King Khalid International Airport and King Fahd International Airport, ownership of both former airports were transferred to the Ministry of Defense as a Royal Saudi Air Force base (RSAF). Riyadh International Airport was renamed to Riyadh Air Base, and later King Salman Air Base, while Dhahran International Airport returned to primary RSAF operations as King Abdulaziz Air Base.

The construction of the new international airports allowed Saudi Arabia to increase the number of routes to international destinations, expanding Saudia's travel network. Following the construction of KAIA, Air Afrique, Air Djibouti, and Japan Air Lines began operating a service from the airport. In 1975, fewer than 1 million passengers used Riyadh International Airport, however, with the construction of KKIA, about 7 million passengers began using the airport by 1983.
