= King Salman Air Base (closed 2021) =

Airport in Saudi Arabia

King Salman Air Base
- قاعدة الملك سلمان الجوية
- Riyadh, Riyadh Province in Saudi Arabia
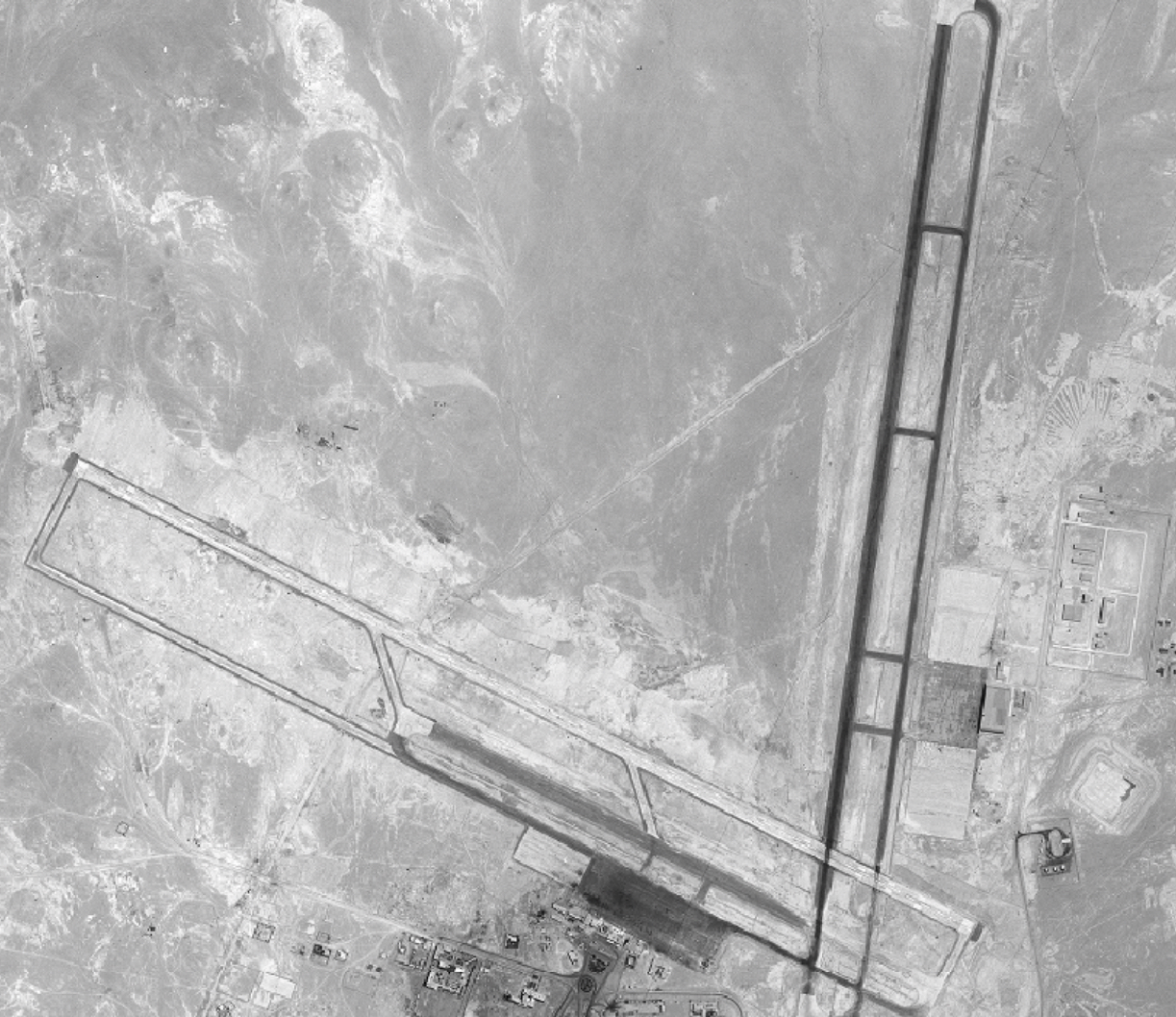
- Satellite imagery of Riyadh International Airport captured by KH-7 Gambit on 18 May, 1966.

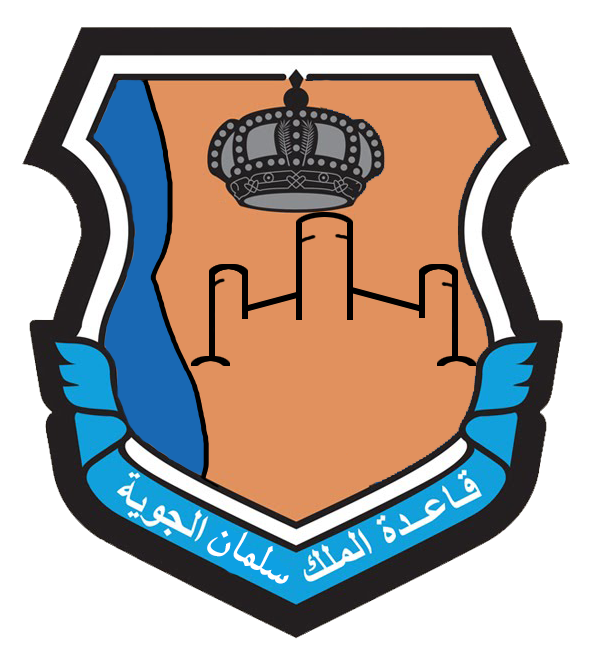
- Emblem of King Salman Air Base

Site information
- Type: Defunct
- Owner: Ministry of Defense
- Operator: Royal Saudi Air Force

Location
- Shown within Saudi Arabia
- Coordinates: 24°42′35″N 46°43′31″E

Site history
- Built: 1945
- In use: 2023

Airfield information
- Identifiers: IATA: ~~XXN~~, ICAO: ~~OERY~~
- Elevation: 635 metres (2,083 ft) AMSL
Runways
| Direction | Length and surface |
|---|---|
| 01/19 | 4,230 metres (13,878 ft) Asphalt (closed 2021) |
| 15/33 | 3,500 metres (11,483 ft) Asphalt (closed 2021) |
| 12/30 | 3,720 metres (12,205 ft) Asphalt (closed 2010) |

King Salman Air Base, ~~(IATA: XXN, ICAO: OERY)~~ officially known as Riyadh International Airport before its conversion in 1983, was one of the first airports of Saudi Arabia located within Riyadh. It was the original airport serving the city before the construction of King Khalid International Airport, before converting into an air base. It was demolished between 2021-22 to make way for King Salman Park.

== History ==
In 1945, the Royal Terminal and the Passenger Terminal were opened by Price Sultan bin Abdulaziz. During the 1940s, Riyadh Airport had minimal facilities; served by a cleared sand landing strip with a windsock and a few tents where visitors were offered sweet mint tea and coffee. Riyadh Airport would serve as a stop for passengers embarking between Jeddah and Dhahran, and aircraft would require royal permission to take off and land. In 1948, Saudi Arabian Airlines began scheduled operations to and from Riyadh. The first runway, 11/29, was built intended to accommodate Douglas DC-3s. By 1954, passenger numbers had grown to 5,900, which prompted King Saud to establish expansion goals. In 1956, he laid a stone in the foundation, and the expansion began in 1957. When Saudi Arabian Airlines acquired Convair CV-340s, a new longer runway, numbered 01/19, was built in 1956 to accommodate the aircraft. By 1958, facilities included a hangar under construction, administration and smaller buildings, and barracks with accommodations for 50 Air Force personnel. There were also grade 1,120 oil available in drums on site, and a former camp which could accommodate 30 personnel.

In 1962, the headquarters of the Royal Saudi Air Force was relocated to Riyadh Airport. Two new lounges, a reception, and departure hall were completed in 1962, totaling the airport area to 9,300 square meters. At the time, passport services were simple, as reservations for travel were done manually. Passports were also applied to international travelers at a few counters, which caused crowding during the initial years of the airport. In 1965, a runway was built parallel to 11/29, and was designated 11L/29R. It was built to accommodate Boeing 720Bs and 707s. After its completion, the eastern end of runway 11/29 was abandoned, and the runway was reserved for light aircraft usage.

Riyadh Airport first operated a wide crushed-rock base runway, which measured approximately 1,950 meters long and 45 meters wide. On July 1958, a new asphalt runway commenced construction, measuring approximately 2743 meters long and 45 meters wide. It consisted of 1.5 meters of asphalt surfacing and a crushed rock end. On 11 January, 1968, King Faisal Air Academy was established in the airport. It provided fixed-wing training and housed an aviation wing unit. The rapid urban extension of new neighborhoods began emerging outside Riyadh and towards the airport. By the 1970s, the airport was close to residential neighborhoods, such as Al Malaz.

=== Military conversion ===
On 16 November 1983, King Khalid International Airport was opened as the part government-led Airports Development Program, replacing Riyadh International Airport. Subsequently, ownership was transferred to Ministry of Defense, and the airport became a base of the Royal Saudi Air Force. Shortly thereafter, the airport was renamed to Riyadh Air Base. By 1983, cadets training at King Aviation Air Academy started with Cessna Model 172 from No. 8 Squadron RSAF before progressing to BAC Strikemaster Mk 80 from No. 9 Squadron RSAF for advanced training, with weapons training provided by No. 11 Squadron RSAF. During Operation Desert Shield, Riyadh Air Base was used as an early deployment point for the U.S. Military Airlift Command (MAC). On 8 August, 1990, a Lockheed C-141 Starlifter arrived, carrying an advanced U.S. Central Command Air Forces team. This served as the first MAC flight for Operation Desert Shield. Following a bombing attack on the Office of the Program Manager/Saudi Arabia National Guard in November 1995, U.S. aviation activities were moved from Riyadh Air Base to Prince Sultan Air Base, deterring and preventing future hostile attacks. In 1996, the 905th Air Refueling Squadron and 906th Air Refueling Squadron deployed aircraft and an element of the Air Expeditionary Force III during Operation Southern Watch to monitor and control airspace in southern Iraq.

In 2009, the construction of a new runway 15/33 was undertaken by Associated Engineers Company and was completed in 2011. The project involved phasing out the former runway 12/30, which closed in 2010, opening up room for road infrastructure upgrades. The project had cost US $200 million. Riyadh Air Base continued to host daily local military and VFR training flights except on Friday nights. While one runway was being demolished and other runway was being built, only 01/19 remained active. In 2013, Abu Bakr Al-Siddiq Road was extended 5 km southward to Salah Al-Din Al-Ayoubi Road, while Al-Orouba Road was extended 6 km eastward to Abdulrahman Al-Ghafiqi Street, near Eastern Ring Road. As the project required crossing Riyadh Air Base, three tunnels under runways were built, measuring 35 meters wide with a total length of 2 km. Two tunnels were connected to the Oruba Road, while the third was connected to Abu Bakr Al-Siddiq Road. Additionally, 45,000 m² of natural grass, 200,000 m² of synthetic grass, 1,000 palm trees, and 3,000 other trees were planted. Due to the project, runway 12/30 was decommissioned and was subsequently replaced by the newer runway 15/33. The road extensions and tunnel were opened on 10 March, 2013, by Prince Khalid bin Bandar Al Saud.

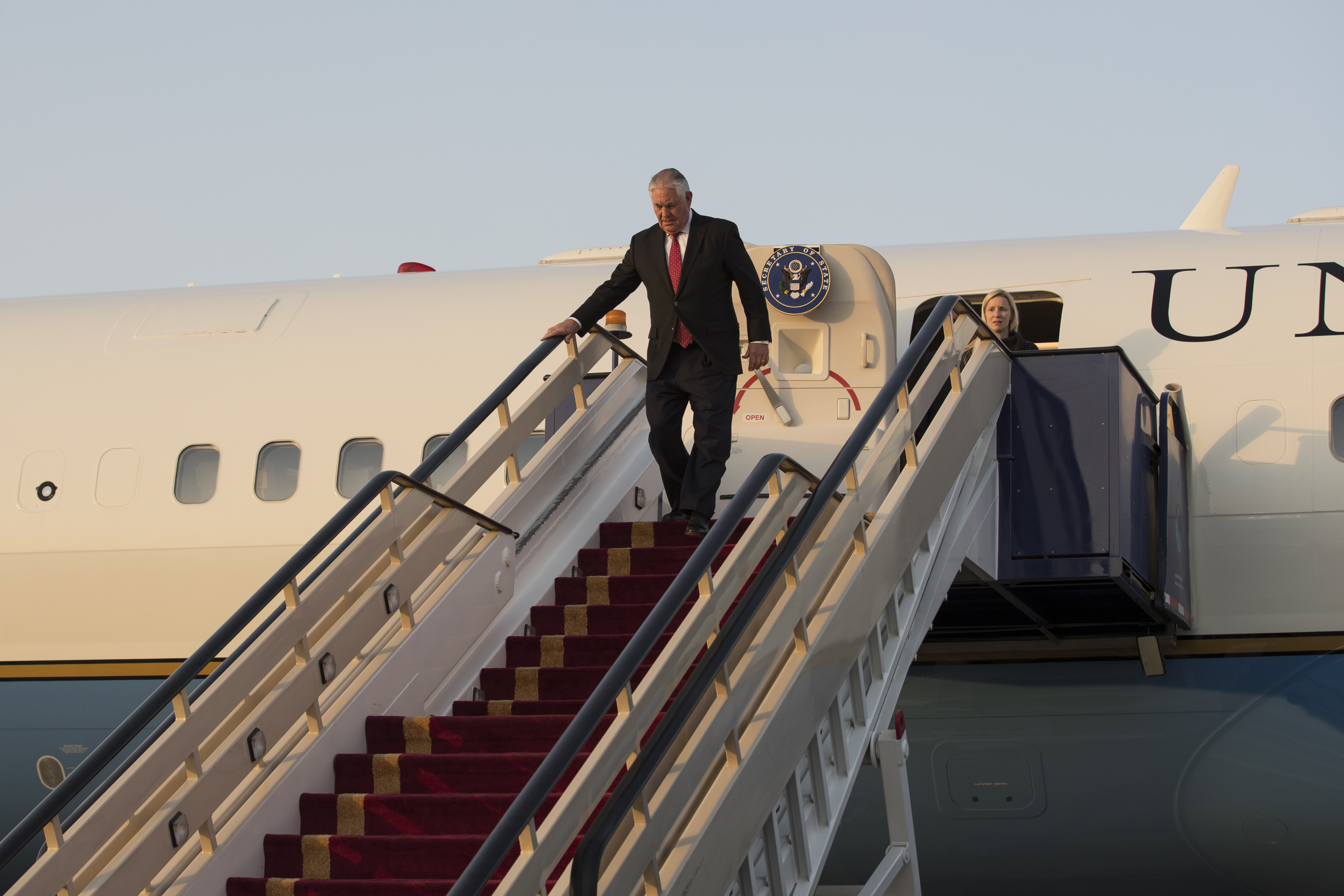
U.S. Secretary of State Rex Tillerson arrives at the King Salman Air Base in Riyadh, Saudi Arabia on October 21, 2017

On October 6, 2015, a Royal Decree was issued to rename Riyadh Air Base to King Salman Air Base to honor King Salman bin Abdulaziz upon his ascension to the throne of that year. Additionally, the timing was aligned with the launch of Operation Decisive Storm. In 2016, the design and production of a drone project implemented by the Prince Sultan Institute for Advanced Technology Research was launched at King Salman Air Base. On 2 June 2016, Saudi Deputy Crown Prince and Minister of Defense Prince Mohammed bin Salman was briefed at King Salman Air Base regarding the project.

=== Closure ===
Originally, the airport was located at a far distance from the city as shown in a 1966 declassified satellite image of Riyadh. However, by the late 1970s, the airport was surrounded by housing, meaning the construction for a new airport was necessary. In 1974, the site for the new airport was selected. In 1983, King Khalid International Airport was opened, and the airport was converted into a military airbase. It was used until it was demolished between 2020 and 2021. The airbase has been replaced by King Salman Air Base, which opened in 2025.

== Facilities ==
In 1980, Riyadh International Airport was served by a small departures terminal measuring 240 square meters, international arrives and transit building, and a royal terminal. At the hottest month of the year, the airport would reach 37°C at maximum. The airport operated 3 navigation aids, which included VOR/DME, Non-directional beacon (NDB), Runway visual range (RVR), and a precision landing system. The tower frequency was 118.1 MHz, while the approach frequency was 126.0 MHz, which were in standard VHF aviation band. As a civilian airport during 1970, Riyadh International Airport was served by multiple hotels, which included Sahara Palace located near the airport, al Yamamah, and Zahrated Chark located in the city.

Before the early to mid-1960s, there were two parallel runways in Riyadh International Airport. There was a 9000 feet runway numbered 11L/29R and another shorter runway (6000–7000 feet runway) numbered 11R/29L. The shorter runway by the 1960s had closed, though in 1966 the 9000 feet runway still showed Runway 30R instead of 30. By 1966, Runway 01/19 was finished with a length of 10,100 feet, although it still needed runway markings. By the 1980s, Runway 01/19 was 13,500 feet meanwhile Runway 12/30 was 11,800 feet. In 2009-2010, a new 10,200 feet runway numbered 15/33 was built. The old runway 12/30 had closed after this.

== Statistics ==
Riyadh Airport only has statistics from 1976.

| Year | Passengers |
|---|---|
| 1976 | 1,544,882 |

=== Former airlines and destinations ===
The following is a list of former airlines and their destinations that served Riyadh International Airport as of March 1983:

| Airlines | Aircraft | Destinations |
|---|---|---|
| Saudi Arabian Airlines | Boeing 707, Boeing 737-200, Boeing 747-100/200, Boeing 747SP, Fokker F28 Fellowship, and Lockheed L-1011 TriStar | Abha, Abu Dhabi, Al-Baha, Amman, Arar, Athens, Bahrain Island, Bangkok, Bisha, Bombay, Cairo, Damascus, Delhi, Dhahran, Dhaka, Dubai, Gassim, Geneva, Gizan, Hail, Hofuf, Islamabad, Jeddah, Karachi, Kuwait, London Heathrow, Manila, Medina, Nejran, Paris Charles de Gaulle, Qaisumah, Rome, Sanaa, Seoul, Singapore, Tabuk, Taif, Turaif, Yanbu |

== Accidents and incidents ==
- 19 August 1980: Saudia Flight 163, a Lockheed L-1011-200 operated by Saudia from Karachi International Airport (now Jinnah International Airport) in Karachi, Pakistan to Jeddah International Airport in Saudi Arabia via Riyadh, suffered a fire just after takeoff from Riyadh. However, due to poor coordination and inexperience, the crew used the entire length of runway 01 instead of performing an emergency stop, and parked on a taxiway at the end of the runway. Additionally, the crew failed to switch off the engines immediately after coming to a stop, preventing firefighters from approaching. The engines were shut down three minutes later, but no evacuation was attempted (likely due to the crew and passengers being either incapacitated or dead from smoke inhalation) and firefighters were unable to gain access into the interior of the aircraft for an additional 23 minutes. The aircraft burst into flames three minutes after firefighters' entry, and all 301 persons aboard died. This was the most lethal accident involving an L-1011 and the deadliest aviation accident in Saudi Arabia as of 2025.
- 24 February 1985: An RSAF KC-130H Hercules aerial refueling tanker was too high when approaching the airport's runway 01. The air traffic controller on duty requested that the aircraft make a 360-degree turn to decrease speed and altitude. However, the pilot instead decided to lose altitude by side-slipping, and the shifting of the fuel load caused the pilot to lose control and crash just short of the runway. All eight crew members died.
