= Salemiyeh =

Salemiyeh سالميه
- Village
- Location within Iran
- Coordinates: 31°32′16″N 49°17′03″E
- Country: Iran
- Province: Khuzestan
- County: Haftgel
- Bakhsh: Raghiveh
- Rural District: Gazin

Population (2006)
  - Total: 287
- Time zone: UTC+3:30 (IRST)
  - Summer (DST): UTC+4:30 (IRDT)

Salemiyeh (Persian: سالميه, also Romanized as Sālemīyeh and Salmīyeh; also known as Seh Leyleh and Sulaimāniyeh) is a village in Gazin Rural District, Raghiveh District, Haftgel County, Khuzestan Province, Iran. At the 2006 census, its population was 287, in 57 families.
