= Iran Air Flight 291 =

1980 deadly plane crash in Tehran, Iran

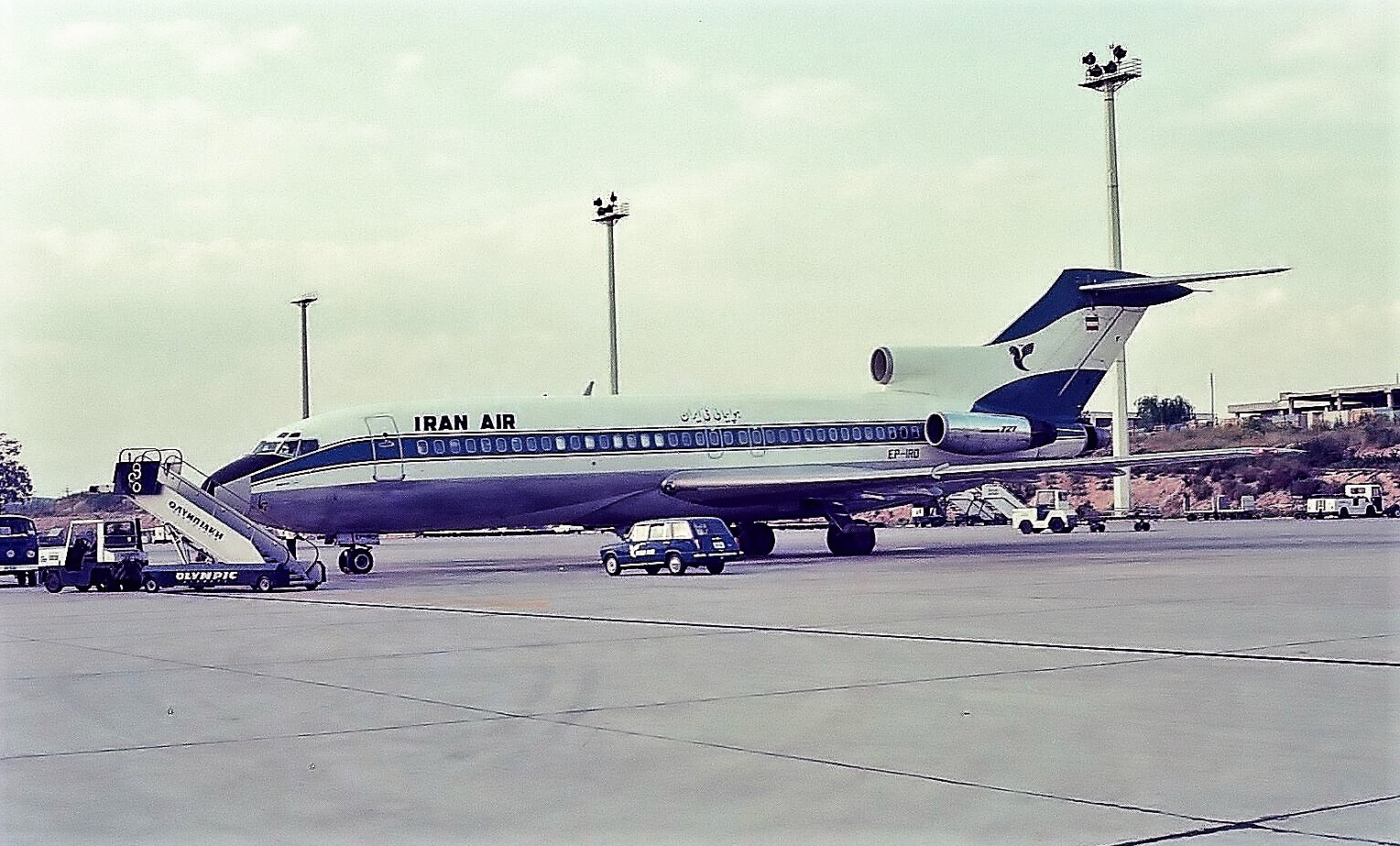
- EP-IRD, the aircraft involved, pictured in 1977

Accident
- Date: 21 January 1980
- Summary: Inoperable ILS and ground radar leading to controlled flight into terrain
- Site: Alborz Mountains, Iran; 35°44′N 51°25′E

Aircraft
- Aircraft type: Boeing 727-86
- Operator: Iran Air
- IATA flight No.: IR291
- ICAO flight No.: IRA291
- Call sign: IRANAIR 291
- Registration: EP-IRD
- Flight origin: Mashhad Airport, Iran
- Destination: Tehran-Mehrabad Airport, Iran
- Occupants: 128
- Passengers: 120
- Crew: 8
- Fatalities: 128
- Survivors: 0

Iran Air Flight 291 was a charter flight from Mashad Airport to Tehran-Mehrabad Airport. On 21 January 1980, the Boeing 727-86 during its approach crashed on the Tehran-Mehrabad runway 29 in foggy and snowy weather conditions, killing all 128 people on board. At the time, Iran Air Flight 291 was the deadliest aircraft disaster in Iranian history.

== Aircraft ==
The aircraft involved was Boeing 727-86 with registration EP-IRD (factory no. 19817, serial no. 537) was built in 1968 and made its first flight on 17 February. The aircraft was powered by three Pratt & Whitney JT8D-7B turbofan engines.

== Accident ==
On the day of the accident, Iranian air traffic controllers went on strike, which led to hundreds of domestic flights being cancelled. Then at 16:00 the strike was interrupted, and flights resumed. At 17:40, Flight 291 departed from Mashad Airport bound for Tehran-Mehrabad Airport in Iran. There were 8 crew members and 120 passengers on board (initial reports stated that there were 8 crew members and 116 passengers).

At 18:52 local time, the controller at Mehrabad airport in Tehran gave the crew a direct approach to runway 29. Then at about 19:05, the dispatcher instructed the crew to take a 360° heading to reach the non-directional beacon of the Varamin approach. Without receiving instructions from the controller, the pilots were 17 miles (15 nmi; 27 km) off course to the north. During the approach, the first officer told the captain that the VORTAC was giving the wrong radial course, but he did not respond to this message. At 19:11 local time, the aircraft collided with the Alborz Mountains, 29 kilometres (18 mi; 16 nmi) north of Tehran. All 8 crew members and 120 passengers died in the crash.

== Cause ==
Investigators concluded that the probable cause of the crash was believed to be an inoperable instrument landing system and ground radar. The head of Iran's Civil Aviation Authority and five other officials were charged with manslaughter as a result of the crash of Flight 291.
