= Florida Commuter Airlines =

American regional airline (1980–1981)

IATA	ICAO	Call sign
—	—	FCA
- Founded: June 13, 1980; 45 years ago
- Ceased operations: 1981; 45 years ago
- Hubs: Palm Beach International Airport
- Fleet size: 3
- Destinations: Gainesville, FL, Tallahassee, FL, Jacksonville, FL, Freeport, Bahamas
- Parent company: Scheerer Air, Inc.
- Headquarters: West Palm Beach, FL
- Key people: Rudolph P. Scheerer, M.D.

Florida Commuter Airlines was a small U.S. regional airline founded in 1980 and based out of Palm Beach International Airport.

== History ==
Roberson Air Inc. was founded on June 11, 1979, as a joint venture between Clive E. Roberson and Rudolph P. Scheerer, and operated under the name Red Baron Airlines.

On June 13, 1980, Scheerer Air acquired 100% of Roberson Air Inc., renaming the airline to Florida Commuter Airlines. The management structure remained the same except for Dr. Clive E. Roberson. On July 24, 1980, Florida Commuter Airlines received its carrier operating certificate as a commuter and charter operator. It was certified to fly two DC-3s and a Piper PA-31 Navajo. On September 9, 1980, an interline agreement was signed with Air Florida. An interline and a bilateral agreement was also signed with Eastern Airlines.

== Route ==
The airline offered weekday flights starting in the morning from West Palm Beach, Florida, and stopping in Gainesville, Florida, before continuing to Tallahassee, Florida, and then Jacksonville, Florida. In the afternoon the route was the reverse. Finally in the late afternoon the flight path was West Palm Beach, Gainesville, Tallahassee, and the reverse for the evening. On Saturday and Sunday, Jacksonville was not a destination.

The airline later became Southern Airlines in 1981 shortly after the Florida Commuter Airlines crash of a Douglas DC-3 in the Bahamas on September 12, 1980, and ceased operations completely soon after that.

== Accidents and incidents ==
- On September 12, 1980, Douglas DC-3A N75KW of Florida Commuter Airlines, operating a scheduled international passenger flight from Palm Beach International Airport, Palm Beach, Florida, United States, to Grand Bahama International Airport crashed into the sea 6.5 kilometres (3.5 nmi) off West End. All 34 on board were killed. The aircraft was on an international non-scheduled passenger flight from Palm Beach International Airport, United States, to Grand Bahama International Airport. Although the cause of the accident was never determined, it is known that the aircraft flew into a thunderstorm and that there were pre-existing deficiencies with the pitot tube and static system on the aircraft. Florida Commuter Airlines were criticized for their poor maintenance regime.

== See also ==
- List of defunct airlines of the United States
