= 3rd FAI World Rally Flying Championship =

3rd FAI World Rally Flying Championship took place between August 28 -August 31, 1980 in Aschaffenburg in West Germany.

There took part 32 crews from 10 countries: Federal Republic of Germany (6), United Kingdom (6), Austria (6), Poland (4), Italy (3), Sweden (2), Luxembourg (2), South Africa (1), the Netherlands (1), Switzerland (1).

Most popular airplane was Cessna 150 (6 crews) and Cessna 172 (6), then PZL-104 Wilga (4, Polish team), Piper PA-28 Cherokee (4), Cessna 152 (2) and Piper PA-24 Comanche (2). Other types were single (Piper PA-22, Grumman American AA-5, Morane-Saulnier MS-885, B-24R, Bölkow Bo 207, F-8L Falco, PN-68, SIAI Marchetti SF.260).

== Results ==
=== Individual ===
Pilot / navigator / country / aircraft / points

1.	Witold Świadek / Andrzej Korzeniowski	POL	PZL-104 Wilga	2867
2.	Otto Höfling / Michael Amtmann	DEU	Piper PA-28-140 Cherokee	2854
3.	Luckerbauer / Meszaros	AUT	Cessna 172	2817
4.	Krzysztof Lenartowicz / Wajda	POL	PZL-104 Wilga	2812
5.	Schüttler / Neumann	DEU	Piper PA-28-140 Cherokee	2806
6.	Jan Baran / Wacław Nycz	POL	PZL-104 Wilga	2777
7.	Hasslein / Hasslein	DEU	Cessna 172	2753
8.	Roland Husemann / Sturmi Westerbarkey	DEU	MS-885	2747
9.	Bertilsson / Selander	SWE	Piper PA-28-180	2725
10.	Oppelmayer / Hauschka	AUT	Piper PA-22	2705

=== Team ===
Two best crews were counted.

1. Poland - 5679
2. West Germany - 5660
3. Austria - 5522

== Sources ==
- 3rd FAI World Rally Flying Championship
