= Florida Commuter Airlines Flight 65 =

1980 aviation accident near The Bahamas

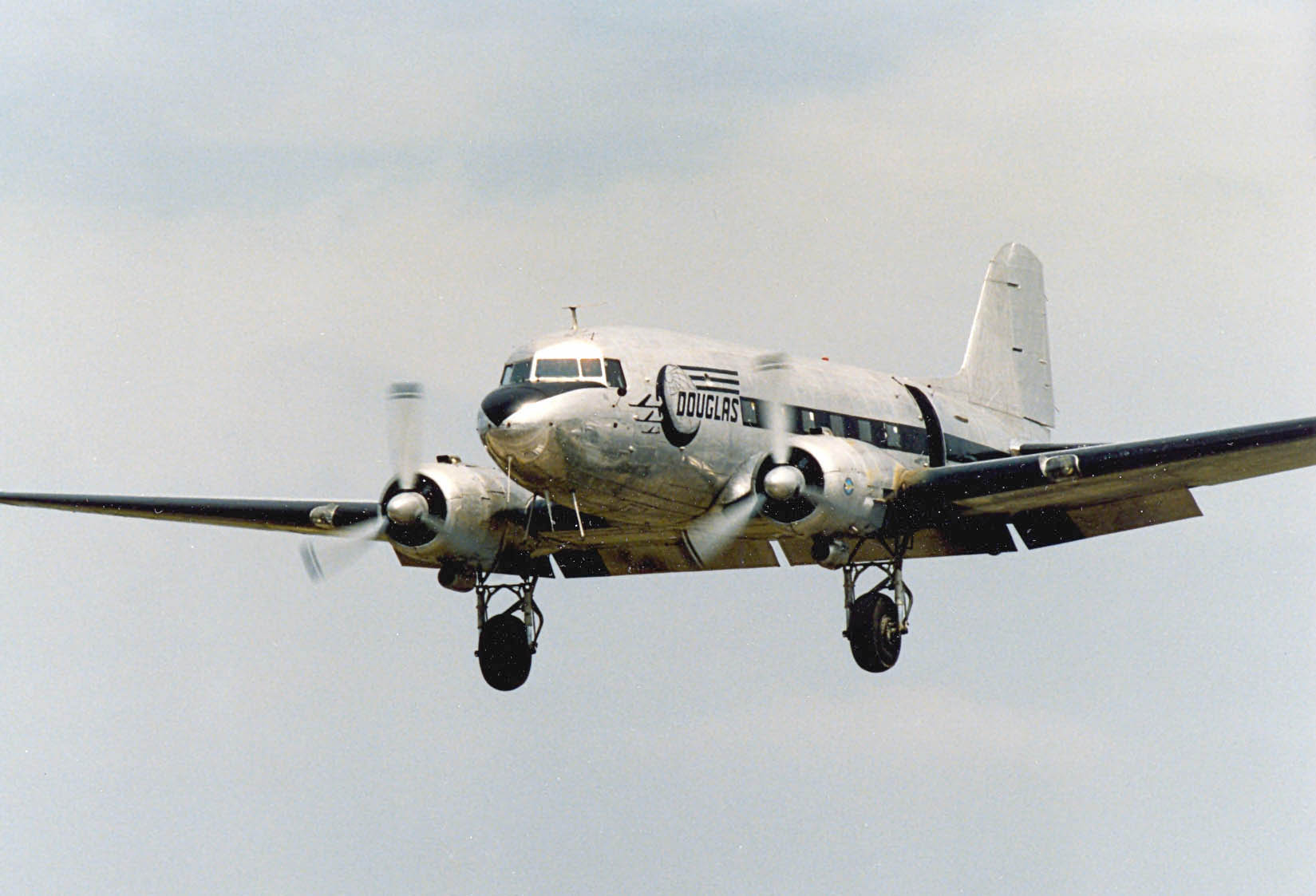
- A Douglas DC-3 similar to the accident aircraft

Accident
- Date: September 12, 1980
- Summary: Cause undetermined
- Site: Atlantic Ocean near West End Settlement, Grand Bahama Island, Bahamas; 26°17′45″N 79°27′26″W

Aircraft
- Aircraft type: Douglas DC-3A
- Operator: Florida Commuter Airlines
- Registration: N75KW
- Flight origin: Palm Beach International Airport, West Palm Beach, Florida, United States
- Destination: Grand Bahama International Airport, Freeport, Bahamas
- Occupants: 34
- Passengers: 30
- Crew: 4
- Fatalities: 34
- Survivors: 0

On September 12, 1980, Florida Commuter Airlines Flight 65, operating from West Palm Beach, Florida to Freeport, Bahamas, crashed into the Atlantic Ocean near West End Settlement on Grand Bahama Island. The Douglas DC-3A used on the flight was not recovered and all 34 persons on board were killed.

Investigators were unable to determine the cause of the crash, but determined that factors likely contributing to the crash included flight into a thunderstorm, unreliable instruments due to discrepancies in the pitot-static system, and lack of proper operational oversight by airline management.

== Flight information ==
Florida Commuter Airlines Flight 65 was a scheduled passenger flight from Palm Beach International Airport in West Palm Beach, Florida to Grand Bahama International Airport in Freeport, Bahamas.The flight was operated using a Douglas DC-3A (registration number N75KW). The aircraft had not been flown for about five weeks prior to the accident, and the pitot tubes were left uncovered during that period.

The flight was operated by Captain William "Bill" Selva Jr. (44), and First Officer Diana Leonard (25). The captain was described as an excellent pilot and very familiar with the route; the first officer had experience on the route and with flying the DC-3. Two flight attendants and 30 passengers were also on board.

A passenger had initially booked the flight for 13 friends and colleagues on the airline's much smaller Piper Navajo, paying $400 for the trip. As the Navajo seats a maximum of 7 passengers, the airline decided to use the larger DC-3 aircraft. In order to fill the excess seats, the airline informally sold tickets for as low as $18 to airline business partners. This resulted in large numbers of passengers who were acquaintances.

== Accident ==
Flight 65 was originally scheduled to depart at 19:30 Eastern Daylight Time. (Note: All times in the NTSB's final report are given in Eastern Daylight Time.) At 19:40, Flight 65 attempted to depart, but the pilots aborted the takeoff because they had no airspeed indication. Passengers were deplaned. Maintenance determined that mud dauber nests were blocking the pitot tube openings for the plane's pitot-static system (which is used to measure airspeed). Maintenance cleared the nests, and a high speed taxi run verified the fix. Passengers reboarded, and the plane departed West Palm Beach at approximately 20:35.

At 20:49, Flight 65 flew beyond the range of Miami radar. At 20:55, Flight 65 made contact with approach controllers at Freeport. At 20:58, the approach controller cleared Flight 65 to descend to 1,400 feet, and the first officer acknowledged the transmission. That was the last communication from the plane.

The plane had no radar and no way to know how bad the weather was ahead of them. The control tower tried to radio the plane at 21:15, but received no response. At 22:43 a United States Coast Guard C-131 reached the area and spotted debris and bodies floating in the water. There were heavy thunderstorms in the area. 16 bodies were recovered prior to the termination of the search on September 15, 1980. There were initial reports that some of the bodies were wearing life jackets, but later reports from the US Coast Guard indicated none of the recovered passengers were wearing life jackets.

Eyewitness accounts state that the plane was flying low and plunged into the ocean shortly after passing through a cloud.

== Investigation ==
The crash was investigated by the National Transportation Safety Board (NTSB).

Wreckage from the aircraft was not recovered, except for seat cushions and plywood bulkheads found floating near the accident site. Regulations at the time did not require flight recorders to be installed on the aircraft, and no cockpit voice recorder or flight data recorder was installed. Due to lack of evidence, the NTSB was unable to determine the probable cause of the accident.

However, the NTSB did identify factors which may have contributed to the crash. Such factors included "known thunderstorm activities and turbulence, preexisting discrepancies in the pitot-static system of the aircraft and their effect on the reliability of the flight instruments, and lack of operational control exercised by the airline's management." The originally scheduled pilot was unable to fly and the replacement pilot informed flight operations for Florida Commuter Airlines that he was not qualified to operate Part 135 (Note: 14 CFR 135 (known as Part 135) governs commercial operations of aircraft in the United States. Part 135 operations have more detailed and strict operational requirements than Part 91 private pilot operations. Both the pilot and operating entity must be Part 135 certified during any Part 135 commercial operations.) flights since he was overdue for a 6-month instrument check. The Director of Operations assured the replacement pilot that the flight was to be conducted under Part 91 (Note: 14 CFR 91 (known as Part 91) governs private operations of aircraft in the United States. With few exceptions, any commercial operation of an aircraft exceeds Part 91 and must meet more stringent Part 135 requirements.) and he was not required to have a current 6-month instrument check. The pilot then agreed to fly a Part 91 flight.

The NTSB determined that the method used to clear the pitot tubes was an "...improper maintenance procedure" and may have contributed to the crash. The chief mechanic, Sam DeThomas, used a small screwdriver and a coat hanger instead of the required procedure to remove the mud dauber nest. DeThomas said the reason he didn't follow the proper procedure (which required disconnecting instruments from the panel and blowing compressed air through the pitot tubes) was passenger impatience. DeThomas told investigators that "I had the problem of people screaming that they wanted to get back on the airplane – not get back on the airplane, but they wanted to go."

During the investigation, investigators received "specific allegations" of the possibility of sabotage. However, in its final report, the NTSB noted "Sabotage, or foul play, has been discounted by the Federal Bureau of Investigation and has not been considered in this evaluation".

== Aftermath ==
A committee called the Raise the Plane Committee made plans to locate the aircraft and recover it from an estimated depth of 1800 feet. The recovery effort was abandoned after the committee was unable to secure enough money to locate the plane.

The Airline was insured by Aviation Insurance Co., a representative of Lloyd's of London. Coverage included aircraft liability, property damage, bodily injury to passengers, and damage to passenger's property. Several of the passenger's families sued the airline, but later settled for $35,000 per passenger. The mother of one of those killed later stated that "I feel badly about it, but we couldn't go through any more. Answering all those questions... They (attorneys for the insurance company) made us feel like she was someone who rented a room from us. I cannot tell you what she meant to me. A beautiful young girl walked out the door and was brutally murdered."
