= Gyroflug Speed Canard =

SC 01 Speed Canard
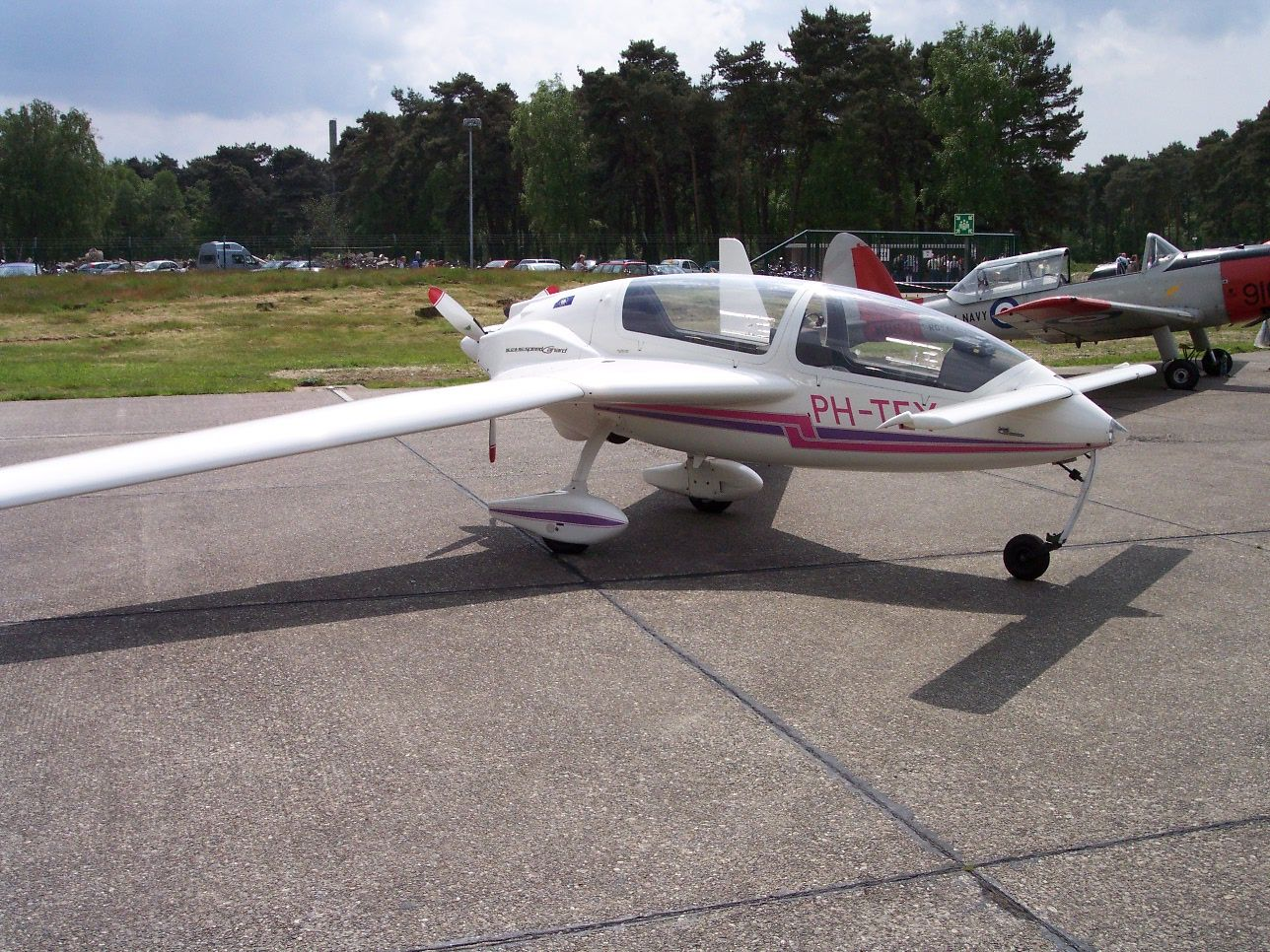

General information
- Type: Sports plane
- National origin: Germany
- Manufacturer: Gyroflug
- Designer: Peter Krauss and Jörg Elzenbeck
- Number built: 62 by 1995

History
- First flight: 2 December 1980

The Gyroflug SC 01 Speed Canard is an unconventional sports plane produced in Germany in the 1980s and 1990s. Inspired by the Rutan VariEze, the Speed Canard was an all-new design created without input from Rutan. Like the VariEze, the Speed Canard is a canard-configured mid-wing monoplane with wingtip fins that incorporate rudders. The two-seat tandem cockpit and canopy design were derived from Grob Twin Astir sailplane, and the nosewheel of the tricycle undercarriage is retractable. Construction throughout is of composite materials, and when the design attained German certification in 1983, it became the first composite canard design to achieve certification anywhere in the world. An interesting feature of the control system is that the twin rudders operate independently, allowing both rudders to be deflected outwards simultaneously, cancelling each other's yaw, but acting as airbrakes.

In 1987, the development of a four-seat version was announced as the E 401, but was abandoned soon thereafter. In late 1988 Gyroflug partnered with Litton Industries using Gyroflug Speed Canard as for Litton's Advanced Tactical Surveillance System.

== Specifications (SC 01 B-160) ==
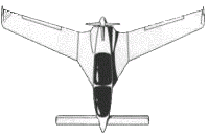
Speed Canard

Data from Jane's All The World's Aircraft 1992–93

General characteristics

- Crew: 1+1
- Capacity: 275kg (605lbs)
- Length: 4.70 m (15 ft 5 in)
- Wingspan: 7.77 m (25 ft 6 in)
- Height: 1.81 m (5 ft 11 in)
- Wing area: 7.84 m^{2} (84.4 sq ft)
- Empty weight: 440 kg (970 lb)
- Max takeoff weight: 715 kg (1,576 lb)
- Fuel capacity: 160 L (35 imp gal; 42 US gal)
- Powerplant: 1 × Lycoming O-320-D1A air-cooled flat-four piston engine, 120 kW (160 hp)
- Propellers: 3-bladed MT-Propeller MTV-6-C/LD

Performance

- Maximum speed: 295 km/h (183 mph, 159 kn) at sea level
- Cruise speed: 275 km/h (171 mph, 148 kn) at 3,050 m (10,000 ft) (econ cruise, 65% power)
- Stall speed: 105 km/h (65 mph, 57 kn) IAS
- Never exceed speed: 365 km/h (227 mph, 197 kn)
- Range: 1,650 km (1,030 mi, 890 nmi)
- Service ceiling: 5,640 m (18,500 ft)
- Rate of climb: 6.6 m/s (1,300 ft/min)
- Take-off to 15 m (50 ft): 540 m (1,770 ft)
- Landing run from 15 m (50 ft): 700 m (2,300 ft)
