= Saudia Flight 162 =

1980 aviation accident

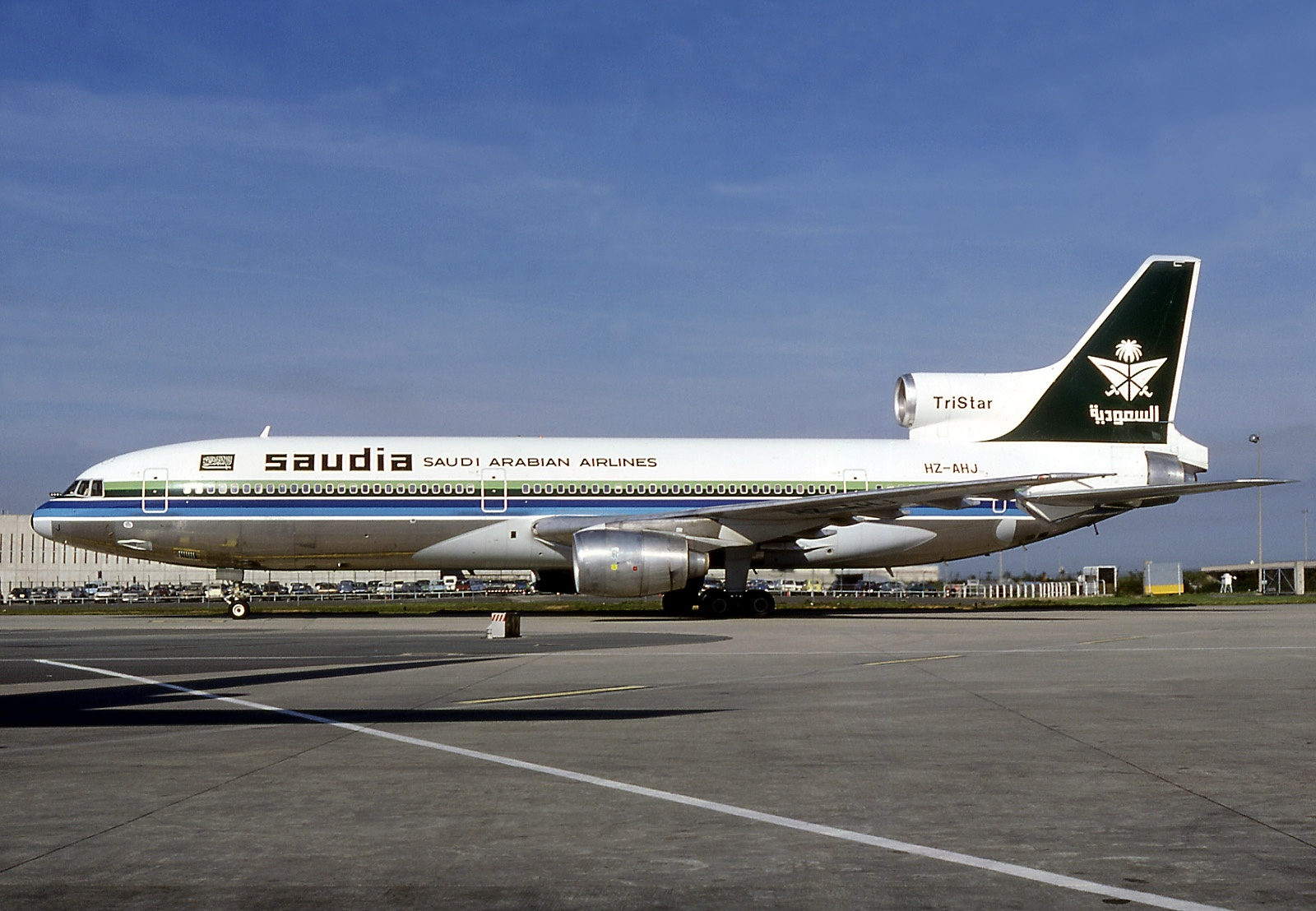
- HZ-AHJ, the aircraft involved in the accident, taken 4 months prior.

Accident
- Date: 23 December 1980 (Note: The accident happened at 2:12 a.m. local time shortly after its early morning takeoff on 23 December, and at 2312 UTC 22 December.)
- Summary: Uncontrolled decompression
- Site: Over the Gulf of Bahrain; 24°15′0″N 50°33′0″E

Aircraft
- Aircraft type: Lockheed L-1011 TriStar
- Operator: Saudia
- IATA flight No.: SV162
- ICAO flight No.: SVA162
- Call sign: SAUDIA 162
- Registration: HZ-AHJ
- Flight origin: Jeddah International Airport, Jeddah, Saudi Arabia
- Stopover: Dhahran International Airport, Dhahran, Saudi Arabia
- Destination: Karachi International Airport, Karachi, Pakistan
- Occupants: 291
- Passengers: 271
- Crew: 20
- Fatalities: 2
- Injuries: 5
- Survivors: 289

Saudia Flight 162 was a scheduled flight from Jeddah, Saudi Arabia, to Karachi, Pakistan, with a stopover in Dhahran, Saudi Arabia. On 23 December 1980, the Lockheed L-1011 TriStar suffered a high-altitude uncontrolled decompression above international waters off Qatar, killing two children who were among the 271 passengers.

This was the second accident involving a Saudia TriStar in four months after Saudia Flight 163, the sister ship to HZ-AHJ operated by L-1011 HZ-AHK, burned after an emergency landing at Riyadh International Airport, killing all 301 aboard.

== Aircraft and crew ==
The accident aircraft was a Lockheed L-1011-200 TriStar, registration HZ-AHJ (S/N 1161).

A total of three crew members were in the flight deck: Captain Fouad Zaghaba, the first officer, and the flight engineer. All three individuals were certified for the flight and had received adequate training.

== Accident ==
The aircraft took off from Jeddah at 22:30 local time and landed without incident in Dhahran at 00:29, where the aircraft was refueled. 60 passengers exited the aircraft and 87 passengers boarded. After takeoff at 01:51, the aircraft was cleared to an altitude of 33,000 feet.

As it climbed through 29,000 ft, one of its main wheel tires failed, exploding and creating a hole in the fuselage and cabin floor. Debris of metal and tire rubber were flung through the cabin which injured several passengers. Two young passengers, a 14-year-old girl and a 1½-year-old boy, were killed when they were ejected through the hole in the cabin floor. Their bodies were never found.

The explosion caused a loss of hydraulic fluid in systems A and B, the failure of the No. 2 engine power generator, and the detachment of the left main landing gear door. The flight crew manually deployed the oxygen masks, and Captain Zaghaba took control. An emergency descent was initiated with the decision to divert to Qatar's Doha International Airport. Bahrain Air Traffic Control handed control over to Doha, which cleared Flight 162 to land on runway 34.

When the flap handle was set to 4°, the flaps did not extend, and the captain reported that he needed to constantly turn to the left, using the ailerons, to keep the aircraft in level flight on a stable heading. He elected to land with the flaps retracted, and jettisoned 16 tons of fuel to reduce the aircraft's weight.

Despite the damage, the landing gear extended normally and the aircraft made a successful landing at 02:48. Zaghaba taxied the aircraft to an apron, where he shut down engines 1 and 3. Doors L1 and L2 were opened, but the evacuation slides did not inflate due to the failed generator on engine 2. The flight engineer started the auxiliary power unit, but it could not be connected to the busbar. Airstairs were brought up to the aircraft and the occupants disembarked. Five passengers sustained minor injuries and were hospitalized.

== Investigation ==
The cockpit voice recorder (CVR) was overwritten and only contained conversations after the emergency landing. The flight data recorder malfunctioned and recorded erroneous data. As a result, both recorders were unusable. The probable cause of the accident was determined to be a fatigue failure of a flange on the hub of one of the main landing gear wheels. This failure caused one of the tires to explode. Debris from this explosion had penetrated the cabin of the airplane, causing the explosive decompression. B.F. Goodrich Co. and Lockheed were found to share responsibility for their failure to assess the safety risks associated with this particular wheel design. In addition, the United States Federal Aviation Administration (FAA) was found to have had inadequate oversight of the manufacturers.

== Aftermath ==
The aircraft was repaired and returned to service with Saudia. It was retired in 1999 and later scrapped.
