= Akaflieg Braunschweig SB-12 =

German single-seat glider, 1980

SB-12

General information
- Type: Experimental Standard Class sailplane
- National origin: Germany
- Manufacturer: Akaflieg Braunschweig
- Number built: 1

History
- First flight: 9 April 1980

The Akaflieg Braunschweig SB-12 is a single seat, Standard Class sailplane designed around 1980 by German technical university students to test out a new wing profile from the German Aerospace Centre. It was not intended for production, but the sole SB-12 remains active in 2010.

== Design and development ==
The Akaflieg Braunschweig or Akademische Fliegergruppe Braunschweig (English: The Brunswick Academic Flying Group) is one of some fourteen German student flying groups attached to and supported by their home Technical University. Several have designed and built aircraft, often technically advanced and leading the development of gliders in particular.

The Brunswick students began the design of the Standard Class SB-12 in mid-1979 and the first flight was made on 9 April 1980. It was not intended for production but to test out a new wing aerodynamic profile designed by the German Aerospace Centre (DFVLR) for high cruising performance. The wing of the SB-12 has single, I-section spars, with carbon fibre flanges and GRP webs. The skins are carbon fibre and polymeric foam. The wings are mounted at mid-fuselage at an incidence of 0.5° and with 3° of dihedral. They carry GRP ailerons and wide span airbrakes but no spoiler or flaps.

The fuselage is a GRP monocoque with a front hinged canopy over the single seat cockpit and a tank for 150 kg (331 lb) of water ballast. The SB-12 has a T-tail, with tailplane and elevators set on top of a straight edged, only slightly tapered fin and rudder. The fixed surfaces are formed from GRP and plastic foam sandwich, the moving surfaces using only GRP. Its undercarriage has a retractable, unsprung monowheel, fitted with an internal drum brake, with a fixed, partly recessed tailwheel.

== Operational history ==
The sole SB-12, registration D-1225 and wearing HQ, for its airfoil, on the tail remained with Akaflieg Braunschweig until they sold it in 1989. About ten years later it was sold to an owner in the German Alps and in 2007 sold again and returned to Brunswick. It remained on the German register in 2010.

== Specifications ==
Data from Jane's All the World's Aircraft 1981/2 All performance figures estimated

General characteristics

- Crew: 1
- Length: 6.40 m (21 ft 0 in)
- Wingspan: 15.00 m (49 ft 3 in)
- Height: 1.40 m (4 ft 7 in)
- Wing area: 10.02 m^{2} (107.9 sq ft)
- Aspect ratio: 22.5
- Airfoil: DFVLR HQ 014, thickness-to-chord ratio 18.43%
- Empty weight: 220 kg (485 lb)
- Max takeoff weight: 450 kg (992 lb)

Performance

- Maximum speed: 250 km/h (160 mph, 130 kn) smooth air
- Maximum glide ratio: 42, best at 98 km/h (61 mph; 53 kn) and an all-up weight of 310 kg (683 lb)
- Rate of sink: 0.6 m/s (120 ft/min) minimum at 78 km/h (48.5 mph; 42 kn) and at an all-up weight of 310 kg (683 lb)
- Wing loading: 44.9 kg/m^{2} (9.2 lb/sq ft)
