= Saudia Flight 163 =

1980 aircraft accident in Saudi Arabia

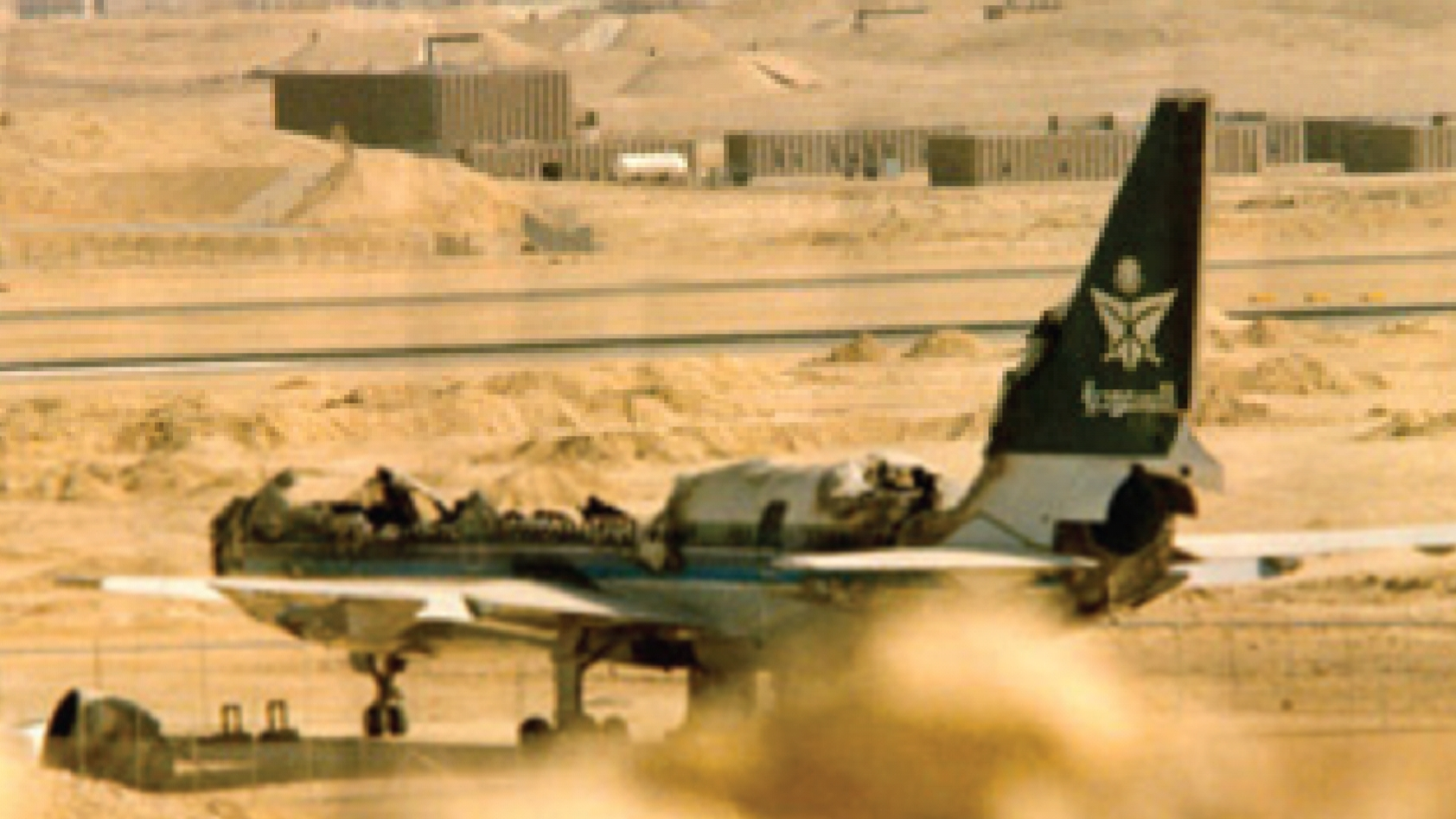
- The damage to the aircraft after the fire

Accident
- Date: 19 August 1980
- Summary: Pilot error: Failure to evacuate following in-flight fire of unknown origin
- Site: Riyadh International Airport, Riyadh, Saudi Arabia; 24°42′42″N 46°43′37″E

Aircraft
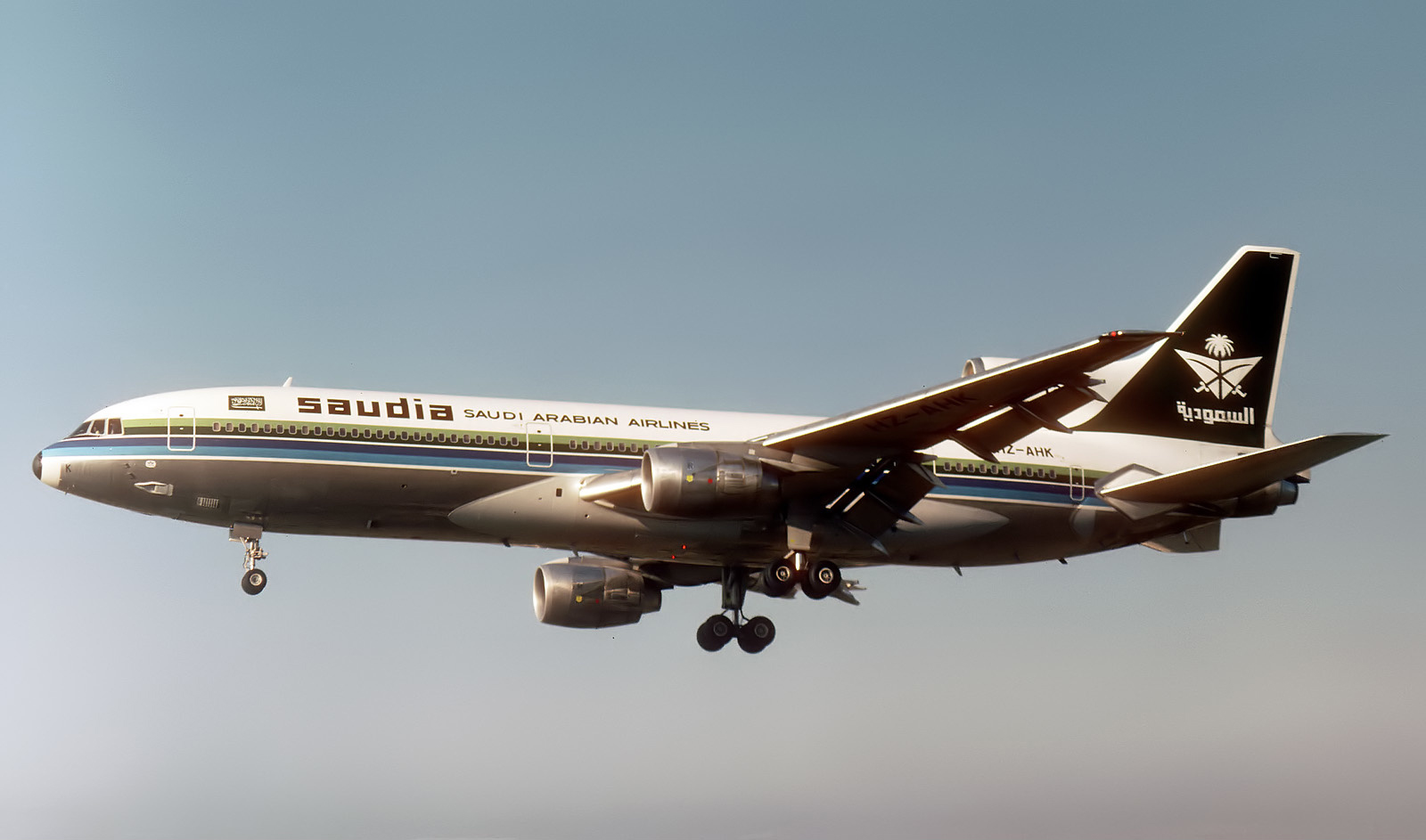
- HZ-AHK, the aircraft involved in the accident, pictured in 1979
- Aircraft type: Lockheed L-1011-200 TriStar
- Operator: Saudia
- IATA flight No.: SV163
- ICAO flight No.: SVA163
- Call sign: SAUDIA 163
- Registration: HZ-AHK
- Flight origin: Quaid-e-Azam Int'l Airport, Karachi, Pakistan
- Stopover: Riyadh International Airport, Riyadh, Saudi Arabia
- Destination: Kandara Airport, Jeddah, Saudi Arabia
- Occupants: 301
- Passengers: 287
- Crew: 14
- Fatalities: 301
- Survivors: 0

Saudia Flight 163 was a scheduled Saudia passenger flight departing from Quaid-e-Azam Airport in Karachi, Pakistan, bound for Kandara Airport in Jeddah, Saudi Arabia, via then-Riyadh International Airport in Riyadh, Saudi Arabia, which caught fire after takeoff on 19 August 1980. Although the Lockheed L-1011 TriStar made a successful emergency landing at Riyadh, the flight crew failed to perform an emergency evacuation of the airplane (making this accident caused by pilot error), leading to the deaths of all 287 passengers and 14 crew on board the aircraft from smoke inhalation.

The accident is the deadliest in-flight fire, the deadliest aviation disaster involving a Lockheed L-1011 TriStar, and the deadliest to occur in Saudi Arabia. At the time, this was the second-deadliest single-aircraft accident in the history of aviation, after Turkish Airlines Flight 981, and the third-deadliest accident overall, when including the Tenerife airport disaster.

== Aircraft ==
The aircraft involved in the accident was a Lockheed L-1011-200 TriStar, registered in Saudi Arabia as HZ-AHK with serial number 1169. The aircraft was certified on 23 July 1979 and was delivered to Saudia nearly a month later. It had accumulated a total of 3,023 flight hours and 1,759 takeoff and landing cycles. HZ-AHK was equipped with three Rolls Royce RB211-524 engines with each having an average of 4,000 total engine hours.

== Passengers and crew ==
Nationalities of the victims
Nationality	Number
Canada	1
Sweden	1
China	1
Finland	1
France	5
Iran	80
Ireland	1
Japan	1
South Korea	4
Pakistan	64
Philippines	6
Saudi Arabia	125
Taiwan	1
Thailand	2
Turkey	1
United Kingdom	5
United States	3
Total	301

Of the flight's passengers, 82 boarded in Karachi, while the remaining 205 boarded in Riyadh. The majority of the passengers were Saudis and Pakistani religious pilgrims on their way to Mecca. In addition to the Saudis and Pakistanis, 32 religious pilgrims were from Iran. Also, a small number of passengers were from various countries, who were heading to Jeddah for diplomatic missions. Four of the passengers were British.

There was a total of three crew members in the flight deck. All were inexperienced with the aircraft type:

- The captain of the flight was 38-year-old Mohammed Khowyter, (Note: Arabic: محمد الخويطر) a Saudi national hired by Saudia in 1965 who had flown the Douglas DC-3, DC-4, McDonnell Douglas DC-9, Boeing 707 and 737. Despite being certified to fly such a wide range of aircraft, Khowyter's records described him as a slow learner and in need of more appropriate training. Khowyter had 7,674 flying hours but only 388 hours on the TriStar – a significantly more sophisticated aircraft.
- The first officer was 26-year-old Sami Hasanain, (Note: Arabic: سامي حسنين) also a Saudi national, who joined the airline as a pilot in 1977. During training Hasanain had at one point been removed from flying school for poor performance. He had 1,615 flying hours in total but only 125 hours in the TriStar: he received his type rating just 11 days before the accident.
- The flight engineer was 42-year-old Bradley Curtis (born Zdzisław Szczęsny). Previously certified as a captain of the antiquated and comparatively unsophisticated Douglas DC-3, he was hired by Saudia during a major recruitment drive in 1974 and assigned to pilot training for their expanding Boeing 707 and 737 international fleet. He failed to qualify, and consequently, his employment was terminated in May of 1978. He appealed his termination and requested to be considered as a Flight Engineer, and offered to fund his own training. He completed his training and was approved as a 707 Flight Engineer in November 1978. In May 1980, after completing a simulator training course at Lockheed California, he was approved as a Flight Engineer on the TriStar. Curtis may have been dyslexic according to the Saudi official accident report; this may have affected his ability to respond correctly to the emergency procedures. Curtis had 650 flying hours as a Flight Engineer, 157 hours of which were on the TriStar.

Six flight attendants were from the Philippines, three were from Pakistan, and one was from the United Kingdom.

=== Notable passengers ===
- Sadi Gülçelik, Turkish basketball player, civil engineer and entrepreneur.

== Accident ==
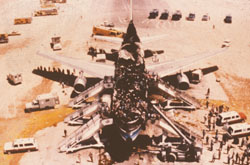
An overview of Saudia Flight 163 after the fire

Flight 163 departed Quaid-e-Azam International Airport (now Jinnah International Airport) in Karachi, Pakistan, at 18:32 Pakistan time (13:32 UTC) bound for Kandara Airport in Jeddah, Saudi Arabia, with a scheduled intermediate stop at Riyadh Airport. The flight arrived in Riyadh at 19:06 Saudi time (16:06 UTC) and had a two-hour layover for refueling. During the layover, several of the passengers disembarked. After refueling, the flight took off at 21:08 (18:08 UTC) bound for Jeddah.

Almost seven minutes into the flight, the crew received warnings of smoke from the cargo compartment. The crew spent the next four minutes trying to confirm the warnings, after which Flight Engineer Curtis went back into the cabin to confirm the presence of smoke. Captain Khowyter decided to return to the airport, and First Officer Hasanain radioed their intentions at 21:20 (18:20 UTC).

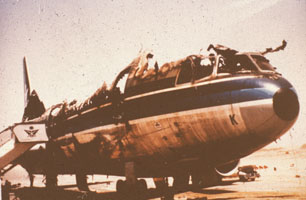
The remains of HZ-AHK, after the fire

At 21:25 (18:25 UTC), the thrust lever for the number two engine (the center engine) became jammed as the fire burned through the operating cable. At 21:29 (18:29 UTC), the engine was shut down during final approach. At 21:35 (18:35 UTC), Khowyter declared an emergency and landed back at Riyadh. After touchdown at 21:36 (18:36 UTC), the airplane continued to a taxiway at the end of the runway where it exited the runway, stopping at 21:39 (18:39 UTC), 2 minutes and 40 seconds after touchdown. The airport fire rescue equipment was stationed back on the landing section of the runway, with emergency personnel expecting an emergency stop and evacuation. This meant they had to rush after the aircraft, which had used the entire length of a 4,000-metre (13,000 ft) runway to slow and then exit onto the taxiway. The airplane stopped facing in the opposite direction from landing.

Once the aircraft had stopped, the crew reported that they were shutting down the engines and about to evacuate. On arrival at the aircraft soon after, however, the rescue personnel found that the two wing-mounted engines were still running, preventing them from opening the doors. These were finally shut down at 21:42 (18:42 UTC), 3 minutes and 15 seconds after the aircraft came to a stop, at which point communication with the crew was lost. No external fire was visible at this time, but flames were observed through the windows at the rear of the aircraft. At 22:05 (19:05 UTC), twenty-three minutes after engine shutdown, the R2 door (second door on the right side) was opened by ground personnel. Three minutes later, a flashover set the entire aircraft ablaze, destroying it from the inside-out. All 301 occupants on board died.

== Investigation ==
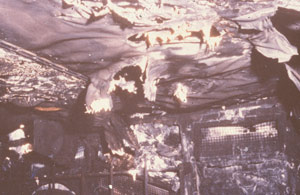
Cargo compartment C3 after the fire

The investigation revealed the fire had started in the aft C3 cargo compartment. The fire was intense enough to burn through the cabin floor, causing passengers seated in that area of the cabin to move forward prior to the landing. The source of the fire in compartment C3 could not be determined. Saudi officials found two butane stoves in the burned-out remains of the airliner, and a used fire extinguisher near one of them. One early theory was that the fire began in the passenger cabin when a passenger used his own butane stove to heat water for tea. The investigation found no evidence to support this theory.

Why Captain Khowyter failed to evacuate the aircraft promptly is not known. Saudi reports stated that the crew could not get the plug-type doors to open in time. It is assumed that most passengers and flight attendants were incapacitated during the landing roll, or they did not attempt to open a door on a moving aircraft. The aircraft is known to have remained pressurized during the landing roll as the cabin pressurization system was on standby, and the aircraft was found with both pressurization hatches almost completely closed. The pressurization hatches should have opened completely on touchdown to depressurize the aircraft. The crew were found still in their seats, and all the victims were found in the forward half of the fuselage. Autopsies were conducted on some of the non-Saudi nationals, including the American flight engineer. All of them perished from smoke inhalation and not burns, which indicated that they had died long before the R2 door was opened.

== Aftermath ==
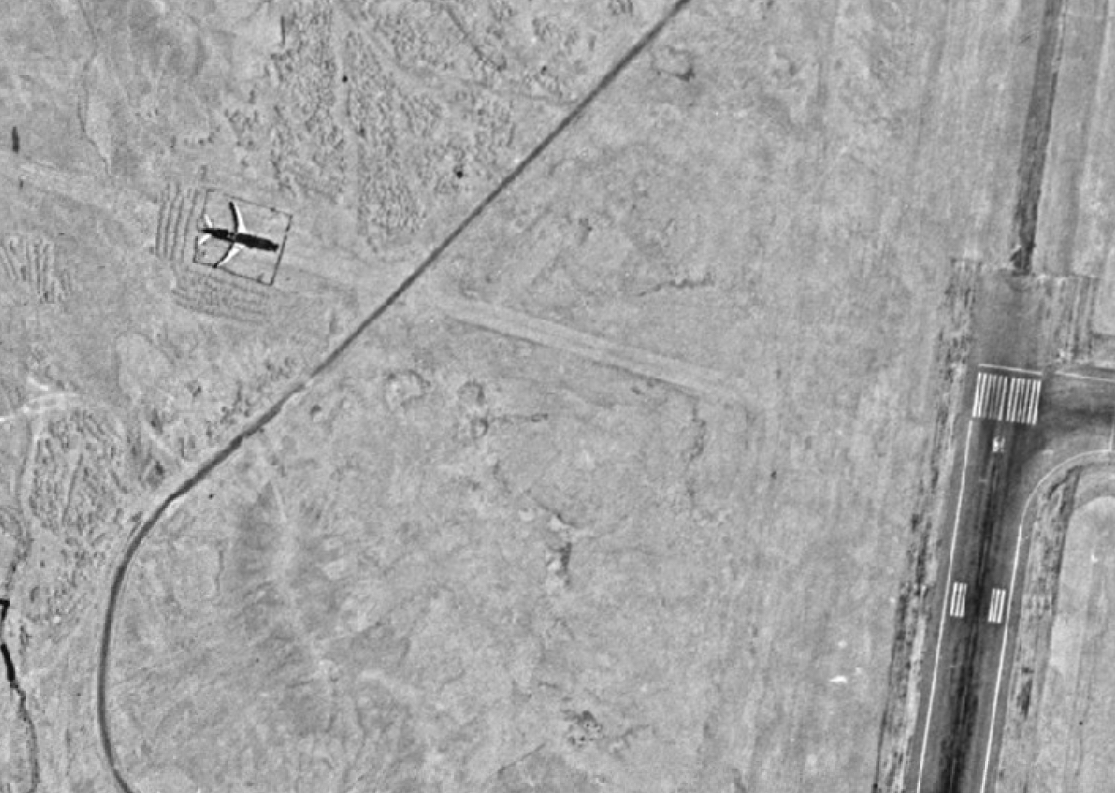
Declassified satellite imagery of showing the burnt-out wreckage of Saudia Flight 163 on 17 July, 1984.

Following the accident, the wreckage of Flight 163 remained in a square perimeter located to the right of runway threshold 19. The engines were also removed. As it was not seen in newer satellite imagery, the aircraft wreckage was likely removed and scrapped sometime in the early 1990s.

=== Policy changes ===
After the event, the airline revised its training and emergency procedures. It hired NTSB investigator Robert MacIntosh to improve its safety training and procedures in the aftermath. Lockheed also removed the insulation from above the rear cargo area and added glass laminate structural reinforcement. The US National Transportation Safety Board recommended that aircraft use halomethane extinguishers instead of traditional hand-held fire extinguishers.

==== Crew resource management ====
Flight 163 highlighted the need for better crew resource management. This is evident from the primary lapses in effective communication that prevented the crew from carrying out a final successful evacuation from the aircraft. These lapses are enabled in part by so-called power distances between juniors and superiors in workplace settings, relationships found in all societies, but emphasized more in some than in others. "In high power-distance cultures, juniors do not question superiors and leaders may be autocratic", leading to situations where a first officer finds it difficult to question decisions made by the captain, conditions that may have been present on Saudia Flight 163. Analysis of the cockpit voice recorder (CVR) found that a power distance may have taken place, as the captain repeatedly ignored requests from the flight's chief purser to order an evacuation. As the aircraft's CVR stopped recording before the emergency landing due to fire damage, the exact reason for the captain refusing to order an evacuation is unknown, though his behavior and actions during the flight were found to be contributing factors to the accident.

The power distance phenomenon has the capability of affecting flight safety globally, but as the work performed in the cockpit is markedly dependent upon the ability of one worker to crosscheck the work of another and vice versa, the danger is most apparent in individuals brought up in cultures that traditionally revere high power distances between those in positions of power and their subordinates.

== In popular culture ==
In 1982, the British current-affairs program World in Action aired an episode titled "The Mystery of Flight 163". This documented the accident and was subsequently used to train pilots in the value of crew resource management.

The accident was featured in a Season 24 episode of the Canadian documentary series Mayday (Air Disasters in the U.S.), entitled "Under Fire".

== See also ==
- Similar accidents:
  - Varig Flight 820 (July 11, 1973) is a flight of the Brazilian airline Varig that departed from Galeão International Airport in Rio de Janeiro, Brazil, for Orly Airport, in Paris, France. The plane, a Boeing 707, registration PP-VJZ, made an emergency landing on onion fields about 4 kilometres (2.5 mi) from Orly Airport, because of smoke in the cabin from a fire in a lavatory. The fire caused 123 deaths, with only 11 survivors (10 crew members and a passenger).
  - Air Canada Flight 797 (1983) suffered an on-board fire in its aft lavatory, believed to be due to an electrical fault, which began damaging the aircraft's systems. The crew managed to successfully land the aircraft, but a flashover fire during the evacuation killed 23 of the 41 passengers on board.
  - British Airtours Flight 28M (1985) had to abort takeoff at Manchester Airport due to an uncontained engine failure and engine fire. While an evacuation was ordered and conducted, issues with the evacuation led to 55 of the 137 occupants dying as a result of smoke inhalation.
  - ValuJet Flight 592 (May 11, 1996) crashed into the Florida Everglades shortly after takeoff from Miami International Airport, due to a fire caused by expired and improperly stored oxygen generators in the cargo hold. The crash resulted in the death of all 110 people on board, making it the deadliest aviation disaster in Florida's history and leading to significant changes in airline safety regulations.
  - Nigeria Airways Flight 2120 (July 11, 1991) experienced an under-inflated tire which overheated while taking off from Jeddah. This subsequently led to the DC-8 being engulfed in flames, and crash short of the runway at Jeddah. All 261 people on board died, making it the second-deadliest aviation disaster to occur in Saudi Arabia, and the deadliest involving a DC-8.
