= Lama (disambiguation) =

A lama is a Tibetan teacher of the Dharma.

Lama or LAMA may also refer to:

== Music ==
- Lama (Japanese band)
- Lama (Ukrainian band)

== Names ==
- Lama (surname), includes list of name-holders
- Lama (name), an Arabic given name

== People ==
- Lamá (Angolan footballer) (born 1981)
- Lamá (Mozambican footballer) (born 1985)

== Places ==
- Mount Lama, Victoria Land, Antarctica
- Lama Upazila, Bandarban District, Bangladesh
- Lama, Bandarban, a town in Bangladesh
- Lama Passage, a strait on the British Columbia coast, Canada
- Lama, Haute-Corse, a commune in France
- Lama-ye Olya, Kohgiluyeh and Boyer-Ahmad Province, Iran
- Lama-ye Sofla, Kohgiluyeh and Boyer-Ahmad Province, Iran
- Johor Lama, a village in Johor, Malaysia
- Lama (Barcelos), a parish in Portugal
- Lama (Santo Tirso), a parish in Portugal
- Lama (river), a river in Russia
- Lake Lama, a lake in Russia
- Lema, California, or La-ma, a former settlement in the U.S.

== Plants and animals ==
- Lama (genus), the genus of the llama and the guanaco
- Diospyros sandwicensis, a tree endemic to Hawaii
- Diospyros hillebrandii, a tree endemic to Hawaii

== Other uses ==
- Lama (geology), a term to denote a wide furrow in the ground typical of the Murge landscape
- Lama clan (Tamang), an ethnic clan of Tamang peoples
- Lama language, a language in Togo and Benin
- Lama language (Burma)
- Aérospatiale SA 315B Lama, a helicopter
- Lamassu or Lama, the goddess of intercession in ancient Sumer
- Lama Foundation, a commune in New Mexico, United States
- Latin American Motorcycle Association
- Local Automatic Message Accounting, a type of Automatic Message Accounting
- Long-acting muscarinic antagonist
- Los Angeles Music Academy
- Lama (HBC vessel), operated by the HBC from 1832 to 1837, see Hudson's Bay Company vessels

== See also ==
- Lama Lama (disambiguation)
- Lamas (disambiguation)
- Lamma (disambiguation)
- Lammas
- Llama (disambiguation)
