= Llama (disambiguation) =

A llama is a South American animal. Llama may also refer to:

- Llama (language model), a large language model from Meta AI
- Large Latin American Millimeter Array (LLAMA), an astronomical radio observatory
- Llama, a term for four strikes in a row in ten-pin bowling
- Llama (band), American alternative rock band from Nashville, Tennessee
- Llama firearms, a Spanish firearms company founded in 1904
- Library Leadership and Management Association, a division of the American Library Association
- "Llama", an episode of the television series Teletubbies
- Llama District (disambiguation), in Peru

== See also ==
- Llamas (disambiguation)
- Lama (disambiguation)
- Lamas (disambiguation)
- Lammas (disambiguation)
- Lamma Island
- Llamasoft, a software company
- Ilama (disambiguation), or ilama
