= Lamas =

Lamas may refer to:

- The plural form of Lama, a title for a teacher of the Dharma in Tibetan Buddhism.

== Places ==
- Lamas Province, Peru
  - Lamas District
  - Lamas, Peru, the capital of Lamas Province and seat of Lamas District
- Lamas (Braga), a parish in Braga District, Portugal
- Lamas (Cadaval), a parish in Cadaval Municipality, Lisbon District, Portugal
- Lamas (Miranda do Corvo), a parish in Miranda do Corvo Municipality, Coimbra District, Portugal
- Lamas (Macedo de Cavaleiros), a parish in Macedo de Cavaleiros Municipality, Bragança District, Portugal
- Santa Maria de Lamas, a parish in Aveiro District, Portugal
- Lamas, Norfolk, a village in England

== Other uses ==
- Lamas (surname)
- Lamas Quechua, a variety of Quechuan language
- London and Middlesex Archaeological Society (LAMAS)

== See also ==
- Lama (disambiguation)
- Lammas (disambiguation)
- Llama (disambiguation)
