= Lammas (disambiguation) =

Lammas is a Christian holiday.

Lammas may also refer to:

- Lammas Ecovillage, a Welsh off-grid ecovillage
- Lammas growth, a second period of shoot growth in trees that occurs in summer
- Lammas School, a British secondary and sixth form school
- Lammas Night, a WW2 themed fantasy novel
- Lammas green, a housing estate in London
- Ould Lammas Fair, an annual regional fair
- Lammas Limited, manufacturer of motor cars

== See also ==
- Lamas (disambiguation)
- Lamma (disambiguation)
