= Llama Llama =

Llama Llama may refer to:

- Llama llama, a dance of the Andes region
- Llama Llama (book series), a series of children's books
- Llama Llama (TV series), a Netflix TV series

== See also ==
- Lama Lama (disambiguation)
