= Ford Consul =

Car model by Ford (1951–1975)

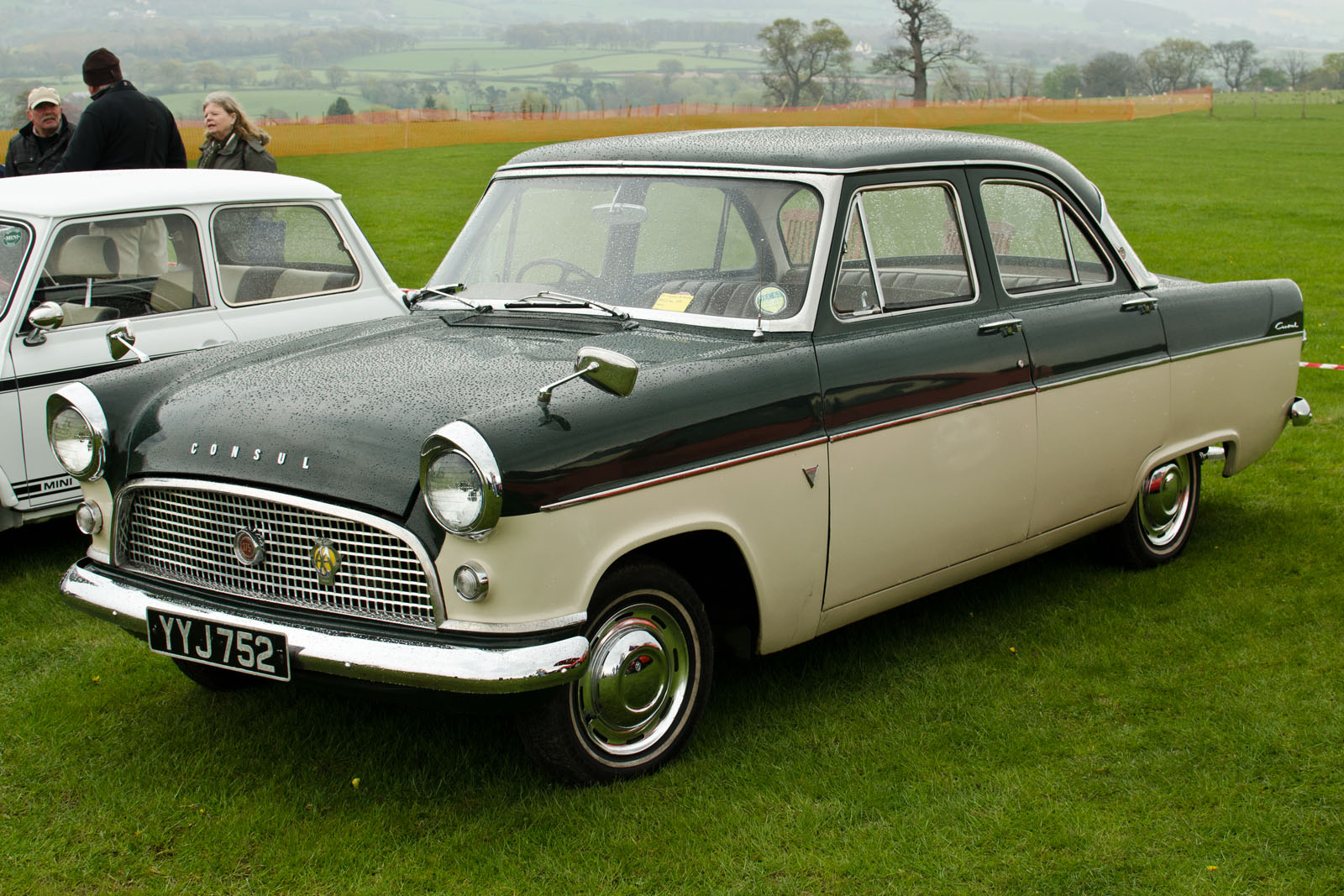
- 1962 Ford Consul Mark II Saloon (204E)

Overview
- Manufacturer: Ford UK
- Production: 1951–1962; 1972–1975 (Consul Granada)
- Assembly: United Kingdom: Dagenham; Australia: Geelong (Ford Australia); Turkey: Istanbul (Ford Otosan)

Chronology
- Predecessor: Ford Pilot
- Successor: Ford Cortina

The Ford Consul is a car that was manufactured by Ford of Britain from 1951 until 1962. The name was later revived for a model produced by Ford in both the UK and in Germany from 1972 until 1975.

Between 1951 and 1962, the Consul was the four-cylinder base model of the three-model Ford Zephyr range, comprising Consul, Zephyr, and Zephyr Zodiac. In 1956, the line was restyled. In 1962, the Consul was replaced by the Zephyr 4, the mid-range Zephyr model becoming the Zephyr 6, and the top-of-the-range Zephyr Zodiac just being called the Zodiac. At this point, Consul became a range of smaller cars in its own right, initially the Consul Classic and Consul Capri, shortly joined by the even smaller Consul Cortina. The Consul Classic was only made for two years (August 1961 - March 1963), before being replaced by the Consul Corsair. The Consul Capri was made from October 1961 until August 1964.

The Consul Classic, the Consul Capri, and the Consul Corsair (made from 1963 until 1970) were relatively short-lived, but the Ford Cortina, after losing (along with the Corsair) the "Consul" tag in 1964, went on to become a best-seller. The Consul name was again used by Ford from 1972 to 1975 on a replacement for the Zephyr range, now sharing a body with the more luxurious Ford Granada Mark I. The two-door coupé Capri's name was also reintroduced in 1969, and survived until 1986.

== Ford Consul EOTA (1951–1956) ==
Ford Consul (EOTA)

Overview
- Production: 1951–1956; 227,732 produced

Body and chassis
- Body style: 4-door saloon; 4-door estate (conversion); 2-door convertible (conversion)

Powertrain
- Engine: 1.5 L I4

Dimensions
- Wheelbase: 100 in (2,540 mm)
- Length: 164 in (4,166 mm)
- Width: 64 in (1,626 mm)
- Height: 61 in (1,500 mm)(convertible)

The 1500 cc four-cylinder Consul was first shown at the 1950 London Motor Show. It was the start of Ford of Britain's successful attack on the family saloon car market. With stablemate Zephyr, it was the first British Ford with modern unibody construction. The Zephyr Six replaced the larger-engined V-8 Pilot which had been made in only small numbers. The Consul was given the Ford code of EOTA. Most cars were four-door saloons with body design by George Walker of the parent United States Ford Motor Company, but a few estate cars were made by the coachbuilder Abbott. From 1953, a convertible conversion by Carbodies became available. Having lost most of its strength with its roof, the unibody was reinforced by welding in a large X-frame to the floor pan. Unlike the more expensive Zephyr, the hood (convertible top) had to be put up and down manually.

It was also the first car they built with up-to-date technology. The new 1508 cc 47 bhp (35 kW) engine had overhead valves, and hydraulic clutch operation was used, which in 1950 was an unusual feature. However, a three-speed gearbox, with synchromesh only on second and top, was retained. The Consul was also the first British production car to use the now-common MacPherson strut independent front suspension.

The bench front seat was trimmed in PVC, and the handbrake was operated by an umbrella-style pull lever under the facia (dash). The windscreen wipers used the antiquated vacuum system, but it came from a vacuum pump linked to the camshaft-driven fuel pump instead of the induction manifold as on Ford's earlier applications of this arrangement. Clearly keen to keep things positive, a 1950 road test by the British Autocar magazine reported that the wipers were "free from the disadvantage of early suction-driven wipers that dried up at wide throttle opening ... and spare[d] the battery". The initial dashboard was a flat, symmetrical panel with interchangeable instrument cluster and glovebox, but from September 1952, a redesigned asymmetrical dashboard was fitted, and the instruments, consisting of speedometer, ammeter, and fuel gauge, were positioned in a housing above the steering column, with a full-width parcel shelf on which an optional radio could be placed.

A car tested by The Motor in 1953 had a top speed of 72 mph (116 km/h) and could accelerate from 0-60 mph (97 km/h) in 28 seconds. A fuel consumption of 26 miles per imperial gallon (11 L/100 km; 22 mpg_{‑US}) was recorded. The test car cost £732 including taxes.

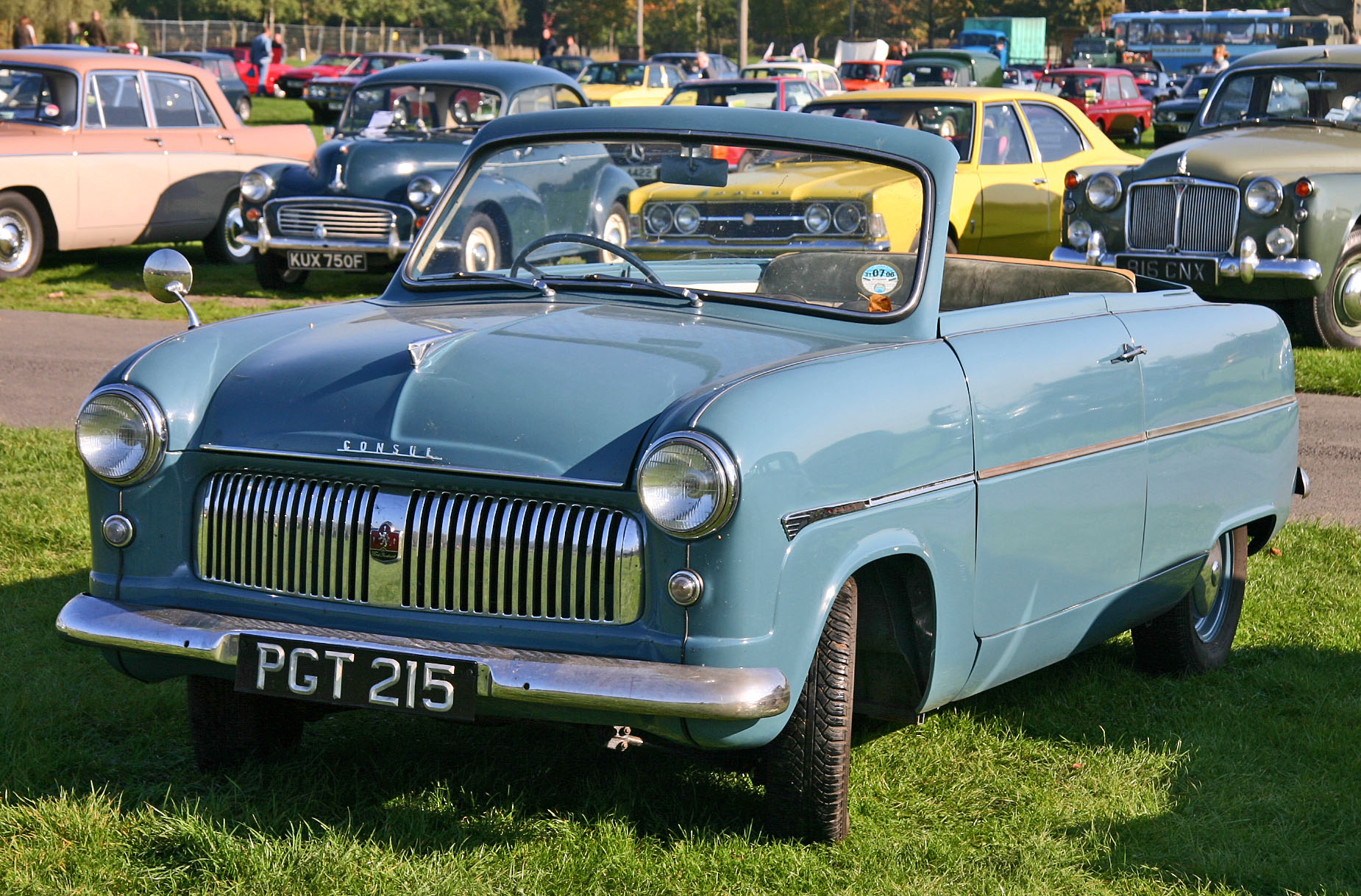
Ford Consul Convertible (EOTA)

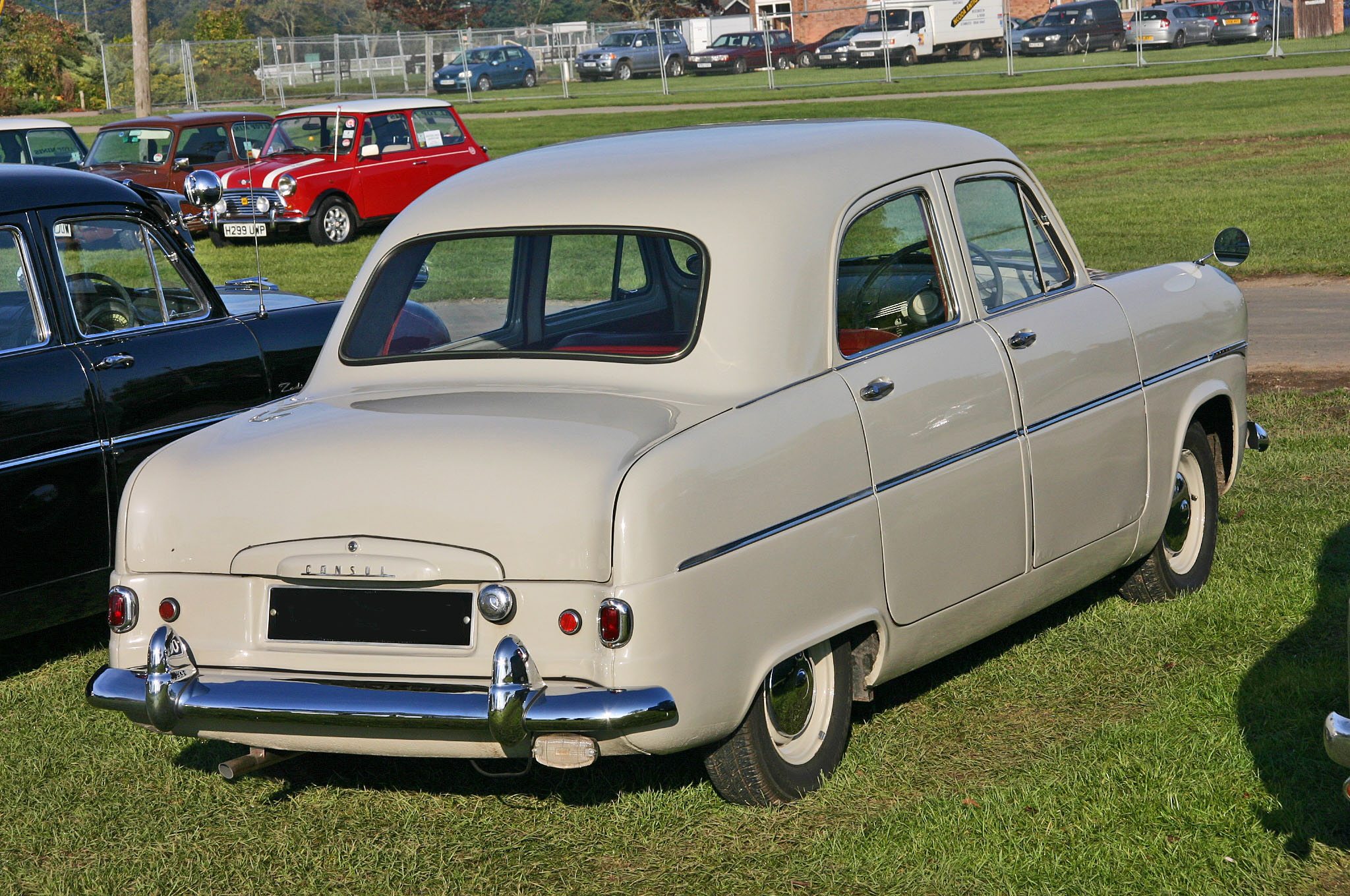
Ford EOTA Consul

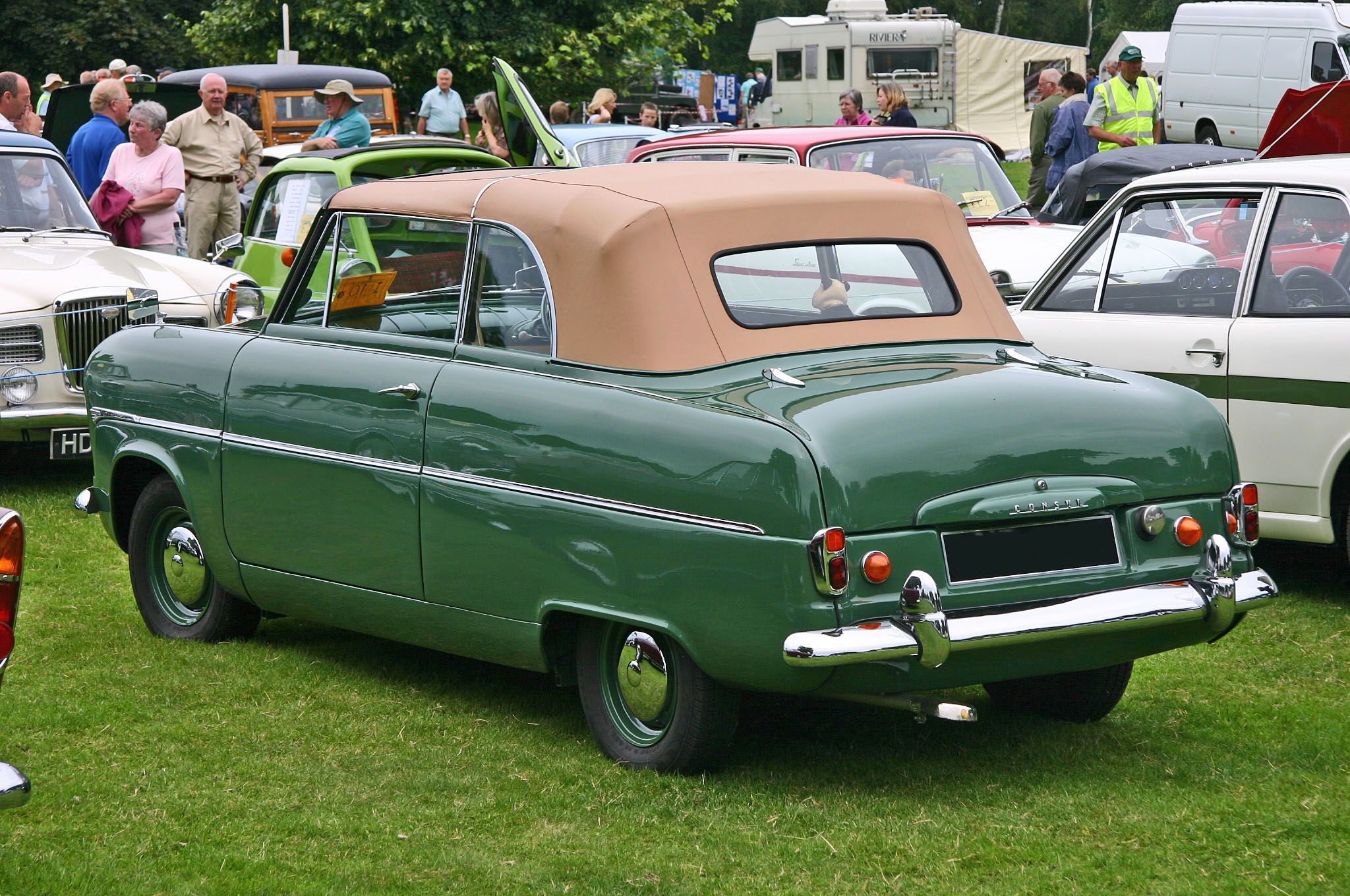
Carbodies Convertible

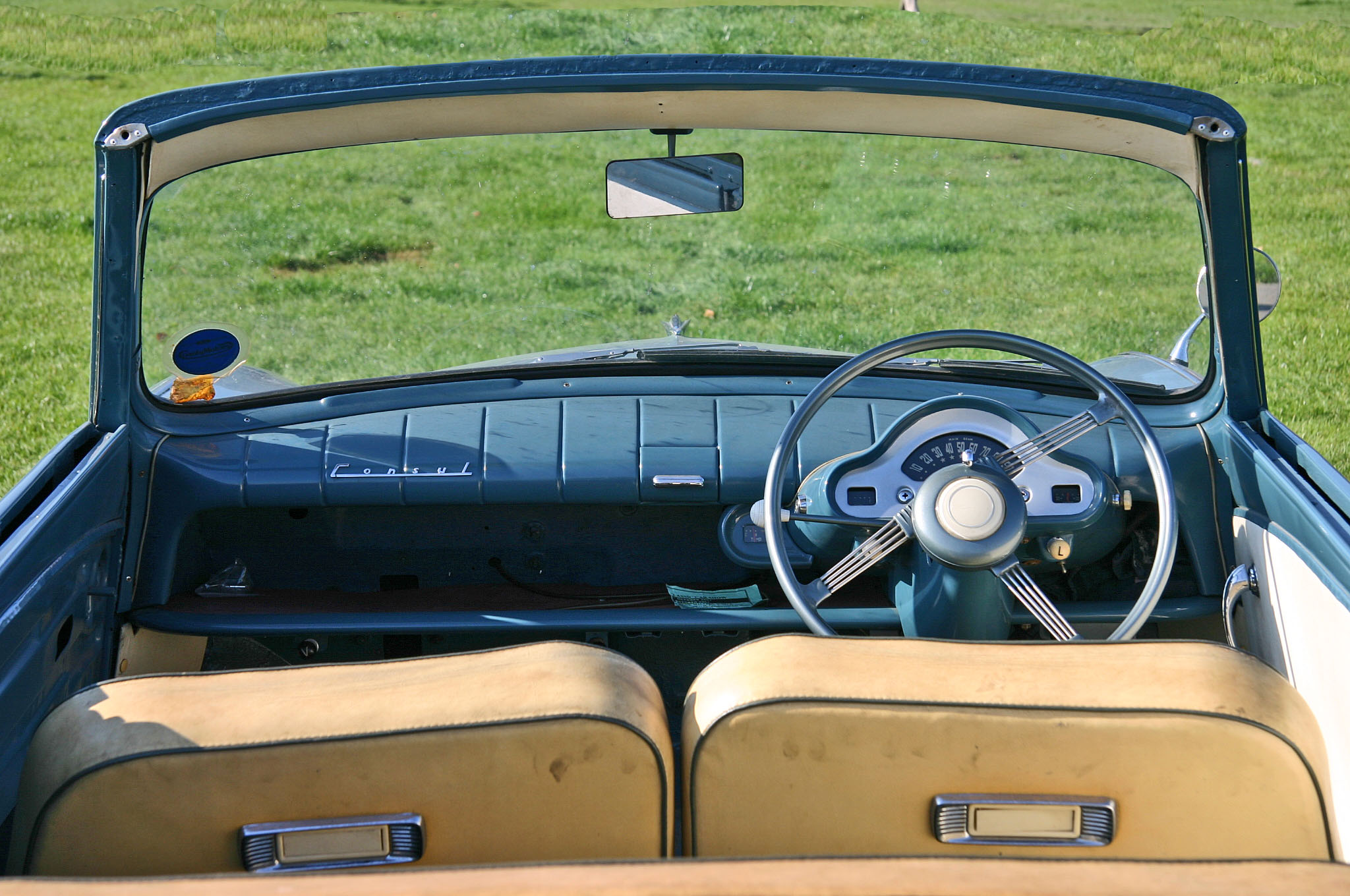
Inside the Consul

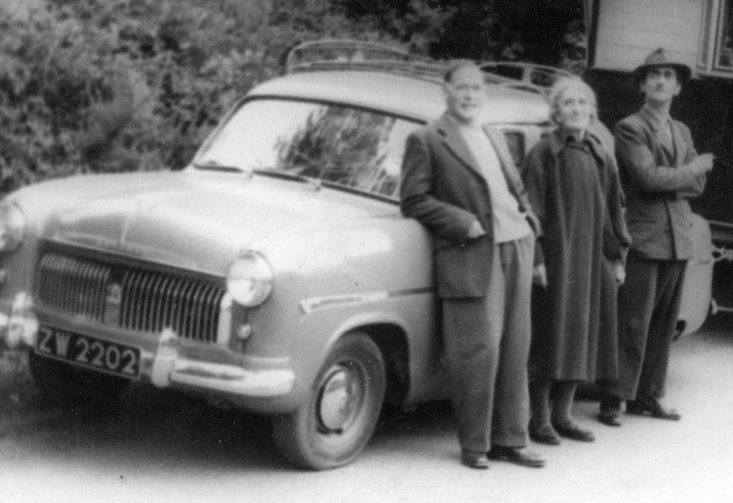
Ford Consul - contemporary photograph

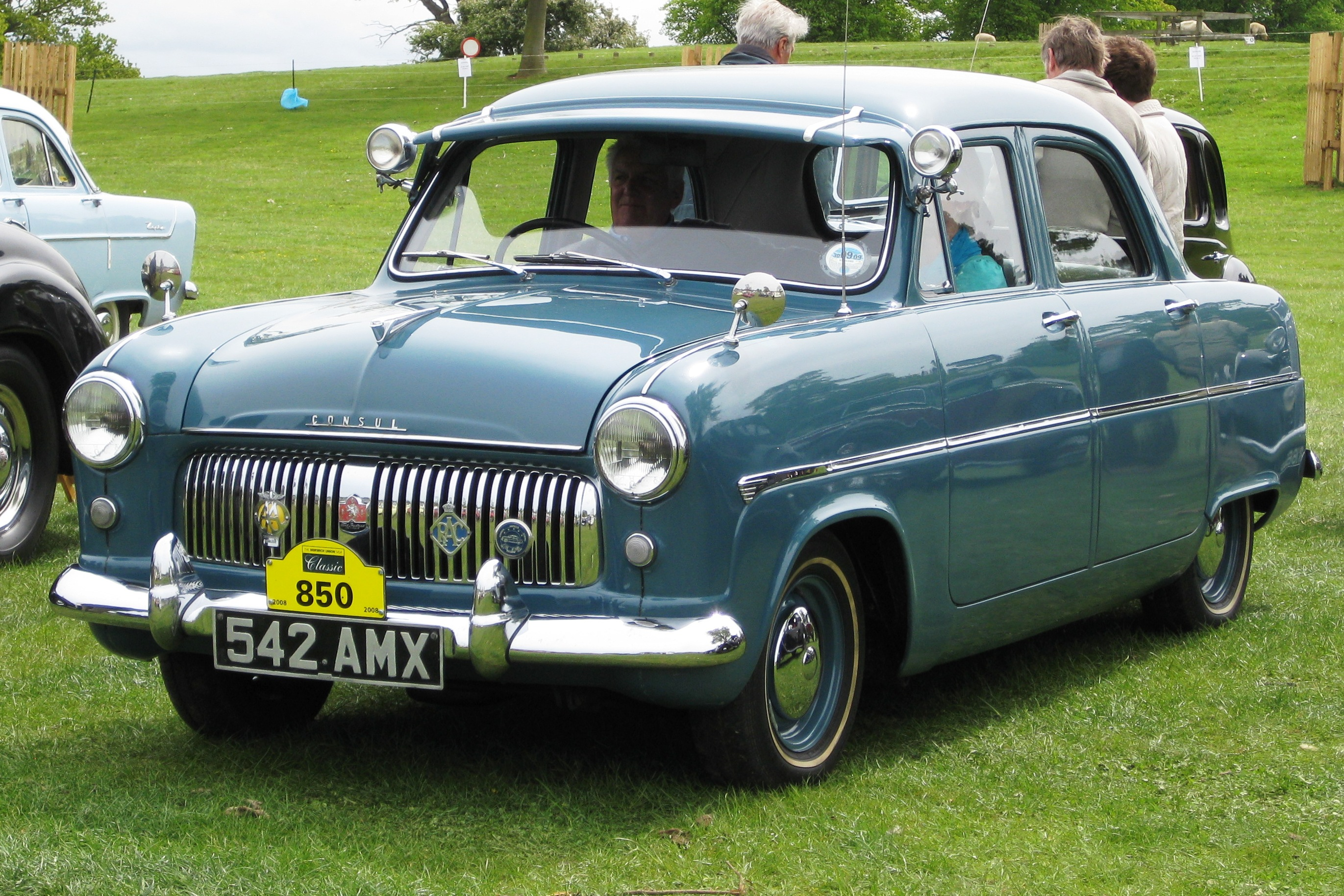
Ford Consul four-door saloon from the front (1954)

== Ford Consul Mark II (1956–1962) ==
Ford Consul Mark II
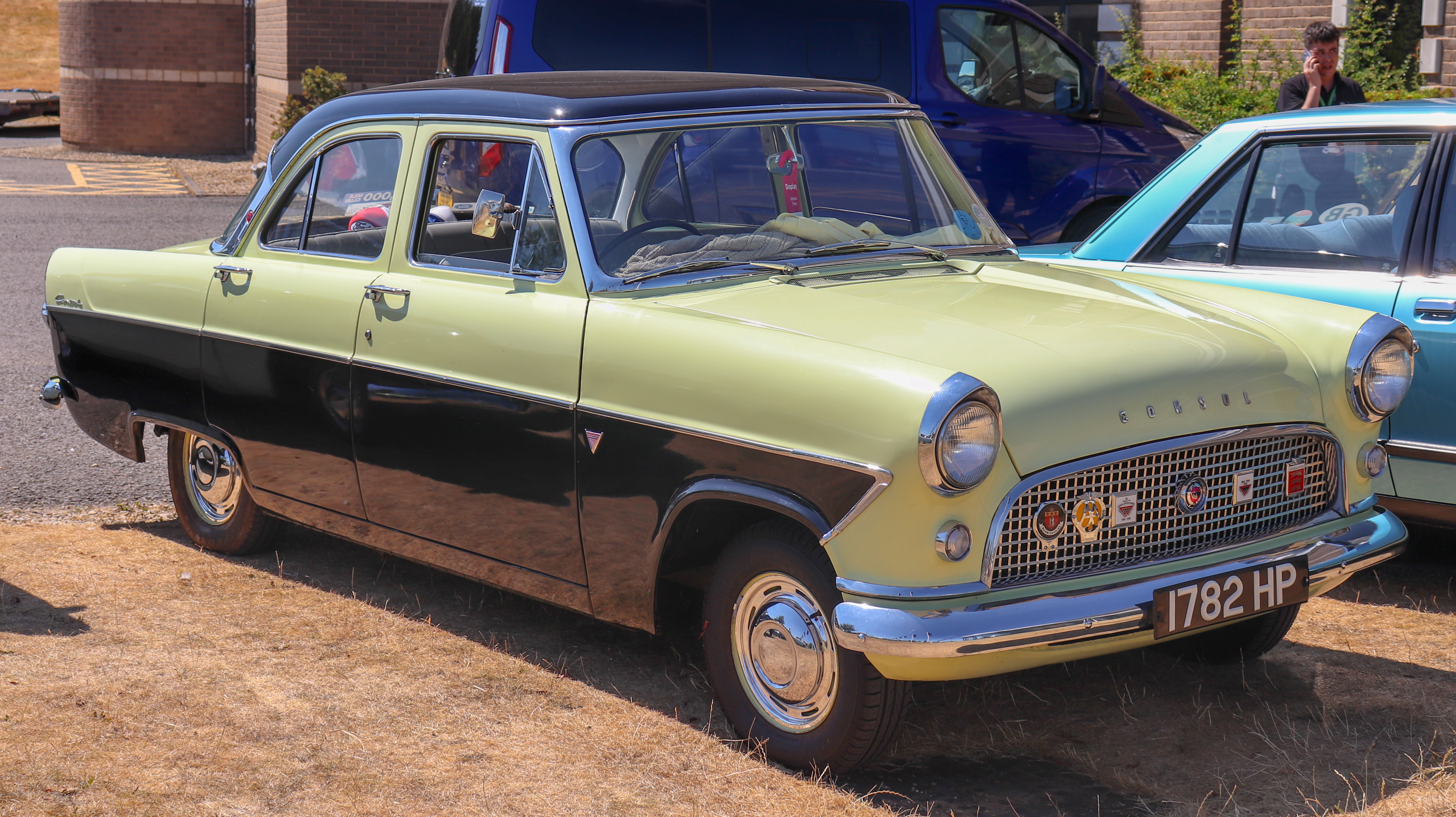
- 1960 Ford Consul Mark II Saloon (Lowline)

Overview
- Production: 1956–1962; 371,585 fixed roof and 9398 convertibles produced

Body and chassis
- Body style: 4-door saloon; 4-door estate (conversion); 2-door coupé utility (Australia only); 2-door convertible (conversion)

Powertrain
- Engine: 1.7 L I4

Dimensions
- Wheelbase: 104 in (2,642 mm)
- Length: 172 in (4,369 mm)
- Width: 69 in (1,753 mm)
- Height: 60 in (1,524 mm)
- Curb weight: 2,700 lb (1,225 kg)

In 1956, a new Consul appeared with the Ford code of 204E. The car was still the four-cylinder submodel of the Zephyr range, with which it shared the same basic body shell. Compared with the original, it had a longer wheelbase, larger 1703 cc, 59 bhp (44 kW) engine, and a complete restyle, borrowing cues from the 1956 models of America's Thunderbird and Fairlane. One thing not updated was the windscreen wipers, which were still vacuum-operated. The roof profile was lowered in 1959 on the Mark II 'lowline' version, which also had redesigned rear lights and much of the external bright work in stainless steel. Front disc brakes with vacuum servo appeared as an option in 1960 and were made standard in 1961 (four-wheel drum brakes only, in Australia). The name became the Consul 375 in mid-1961, It is designed to compete with the Morris Oxford Series III, Austin A55 Cambridge, and the Vauxhall Victor F.

The convertible version made by Carbodies continued. A De Luxe version with contrasting roof colour and higher equipment specification was added in 1957. The Australian market had factory-built versions of the coupé utility (pick up) and estate car (station wagon), as well as a locally engineered version of the saloon. They were also imported by Ford of Canada as a companion to the Falcon.

A Consul Mark II tested by The Motor in 1956 had a top speed of 79.3 mph (127.6 km/h) and could accelerate from 0-60 mph (97 km/h) in 23.2 seconds. A fuel consumption of 22.1 miles per imperial gallon (12.8 L/100 km; 18.4 mpg_{‑US}) was recorded. The test car cost £781 including taxes. A 1960 Ford Consul Mark II was the taxi in which American singer Eddie Cochran died, and not, as many have stated, a London hackney cab.

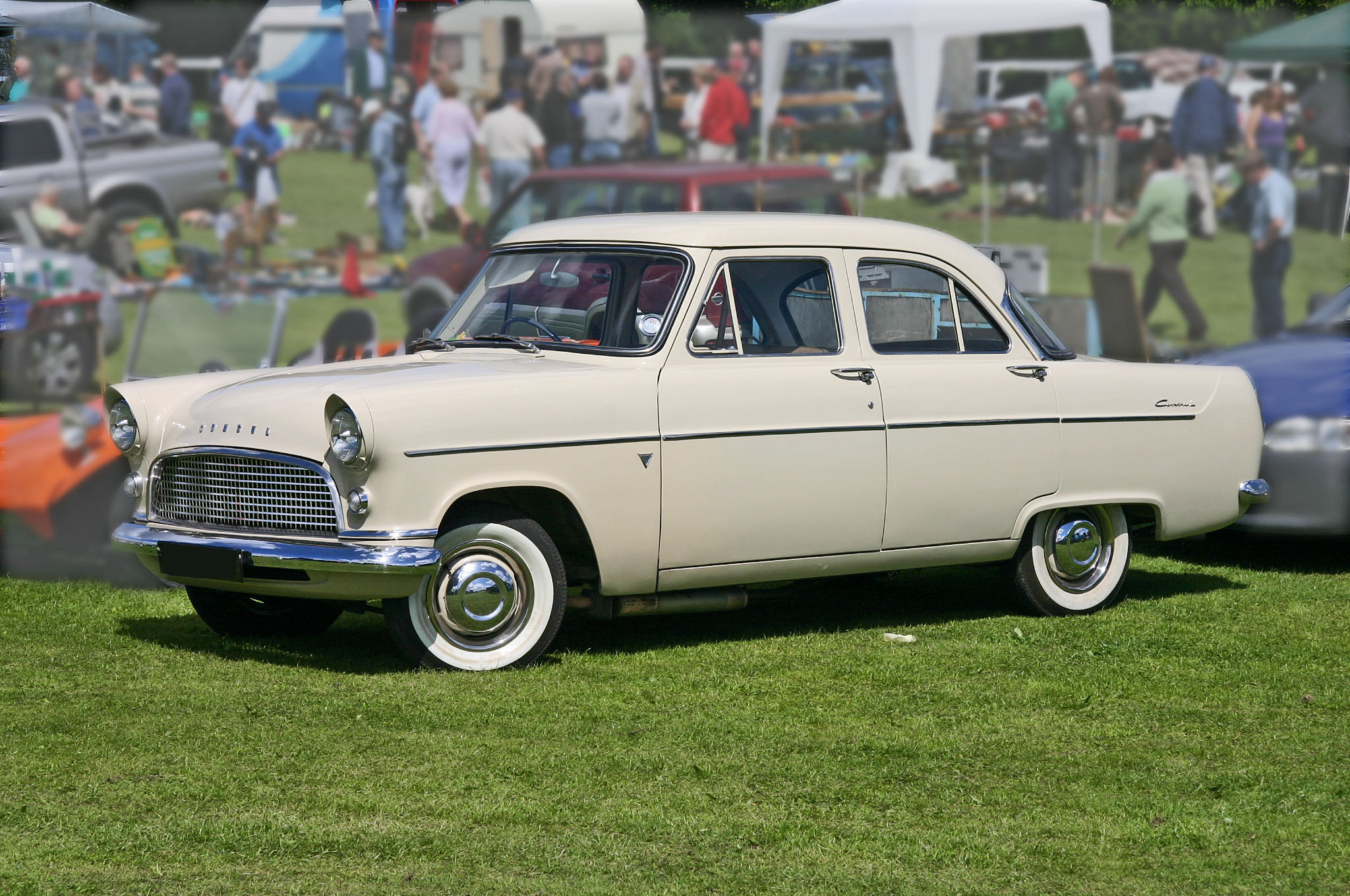
Ford Consul Mark II (Highline)

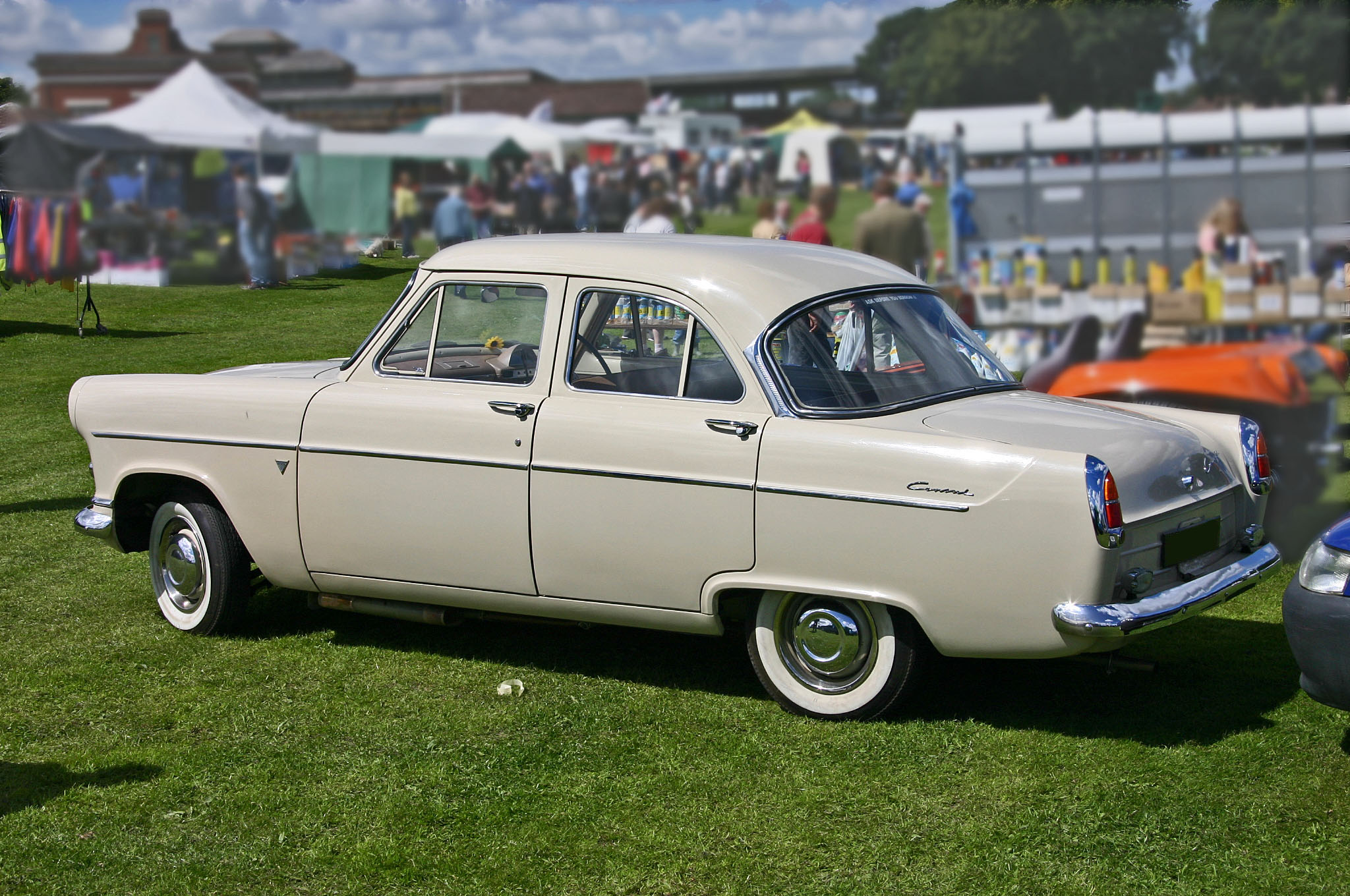
Ford Consul Mark II (Highline)

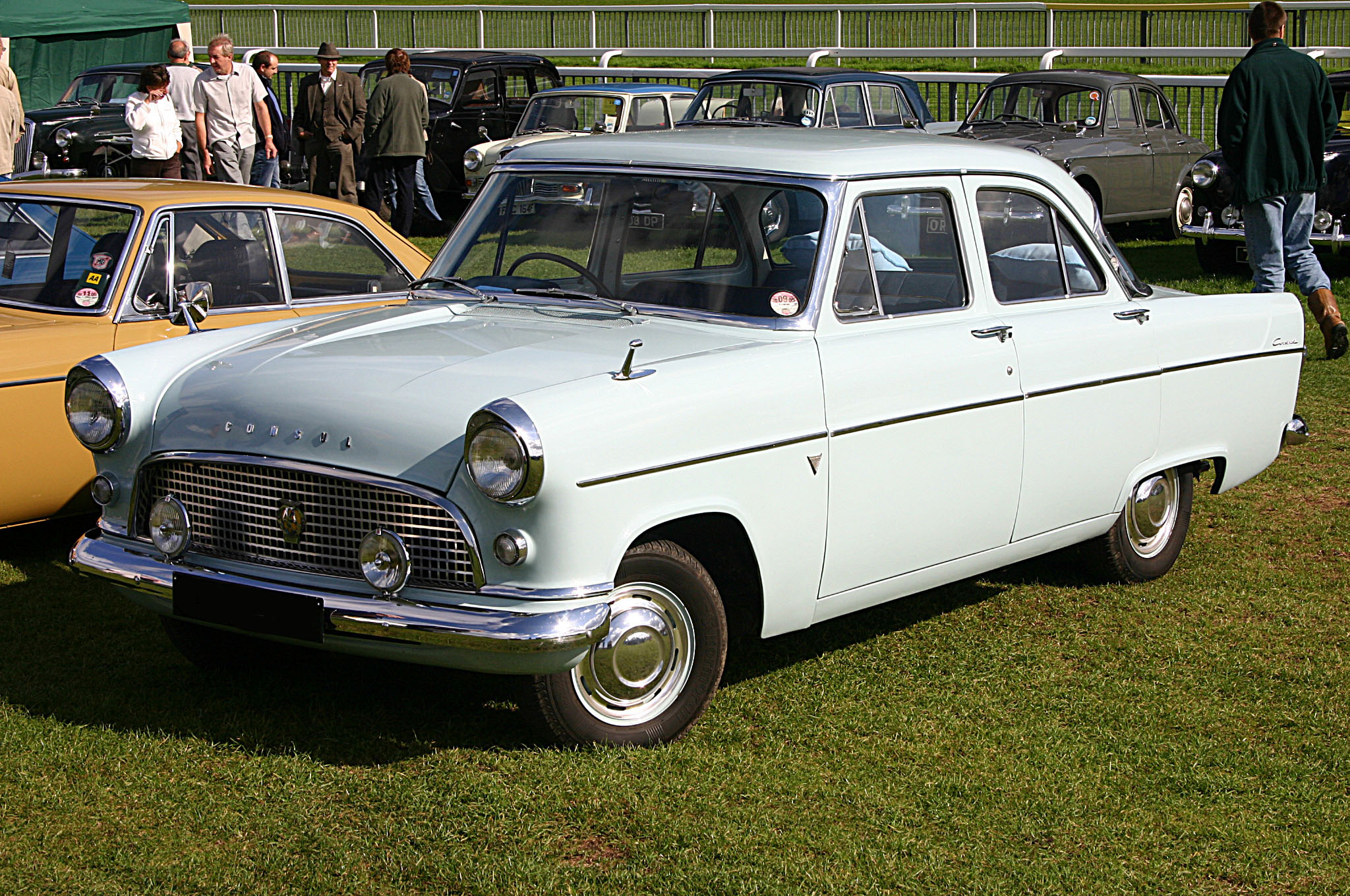
Ford Consul Mark II (Lowline)

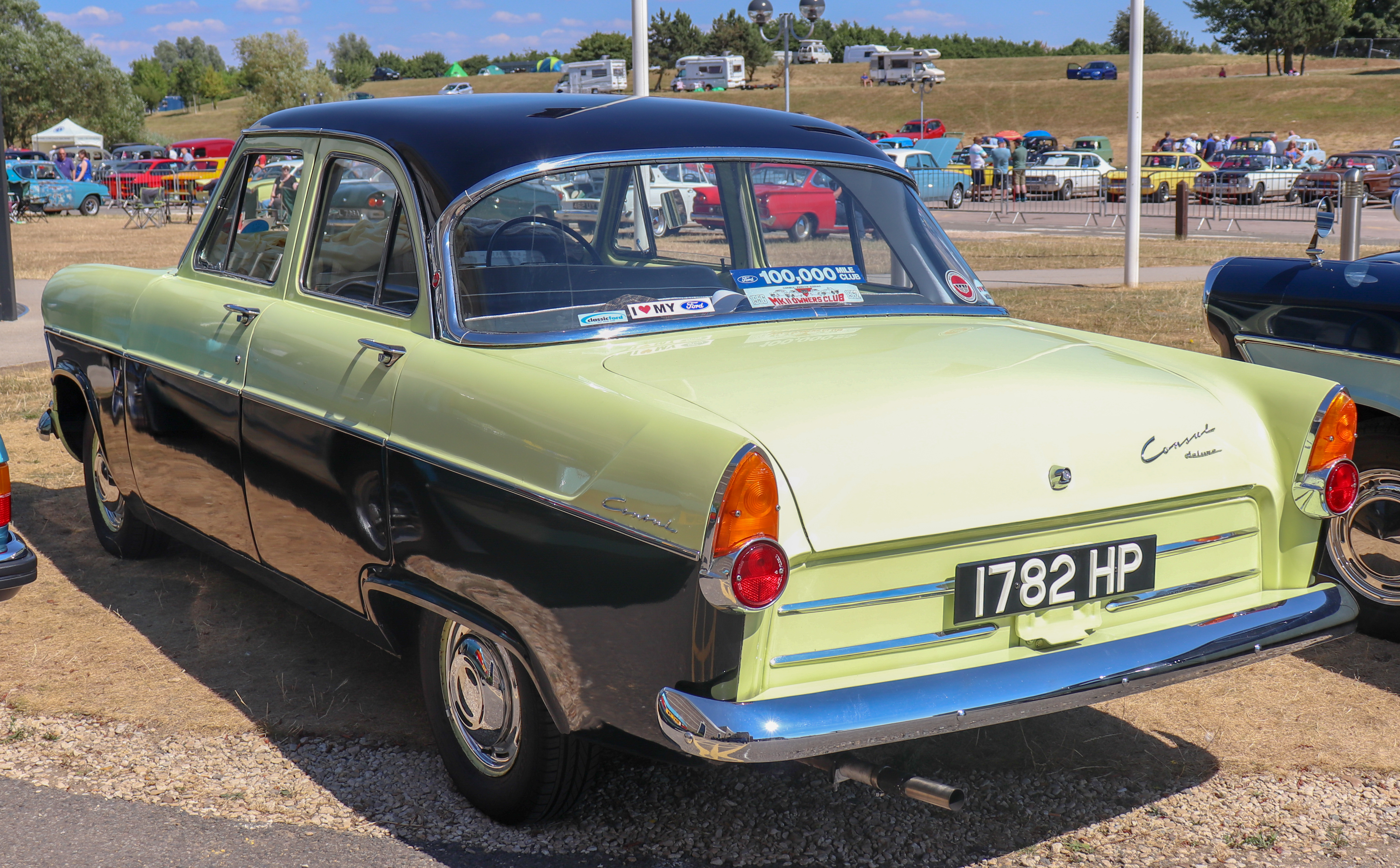
Ford Consul Mark II (Lowline)

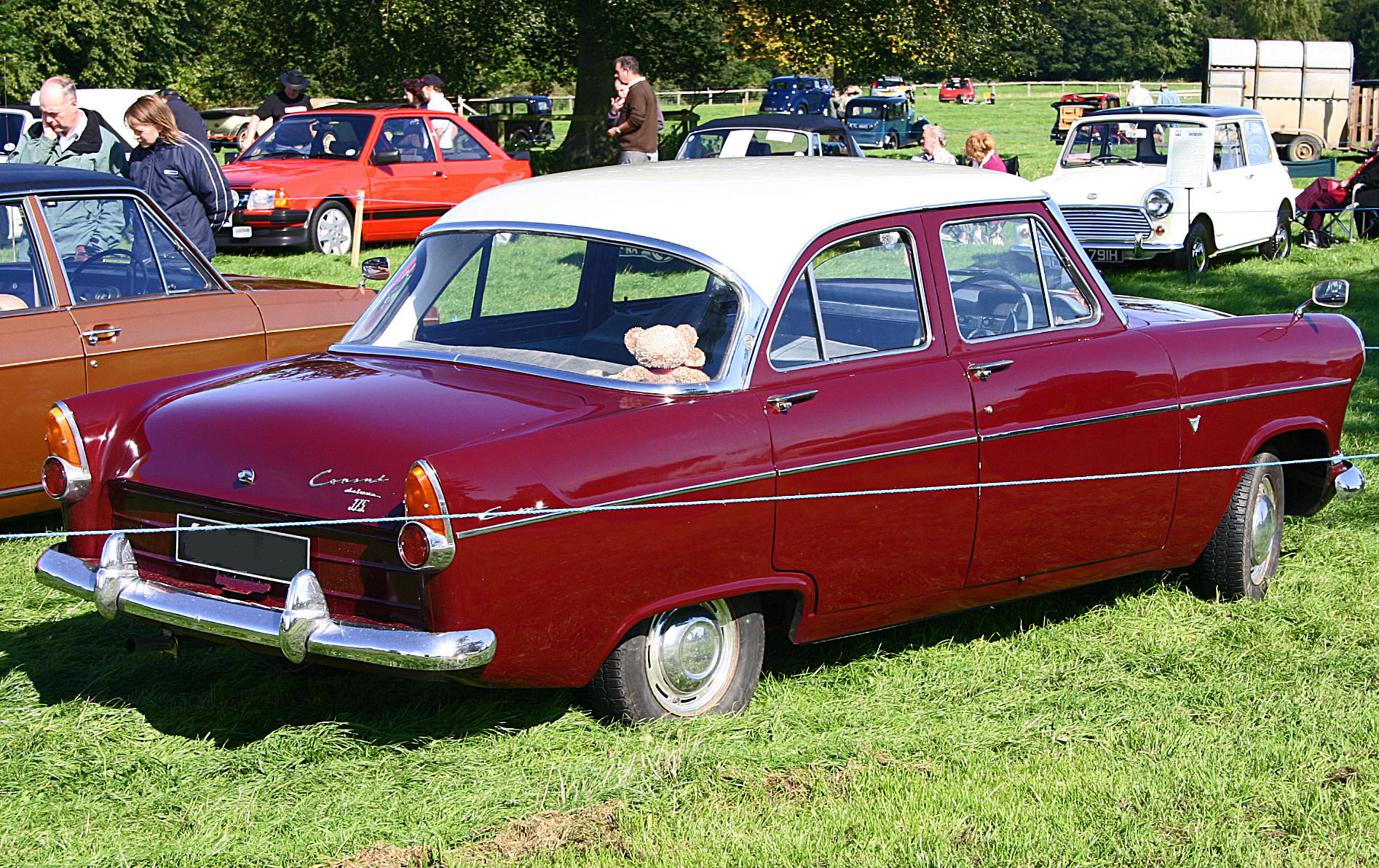
Later models were called the Consul 375

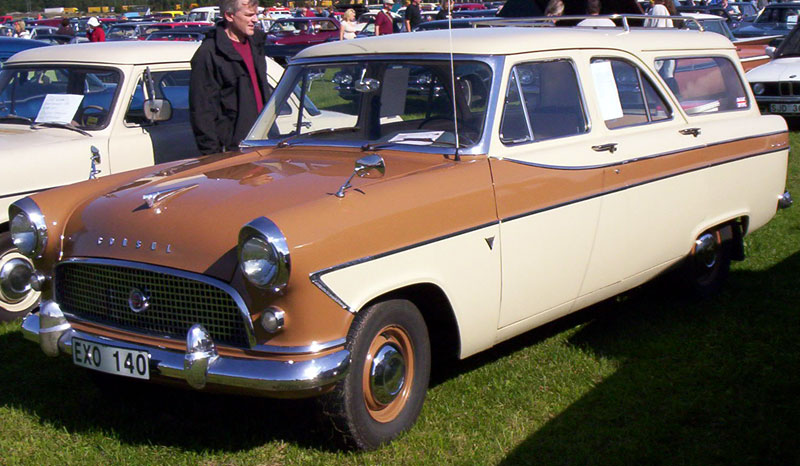
Ford Consul Mark II Farnham Estate

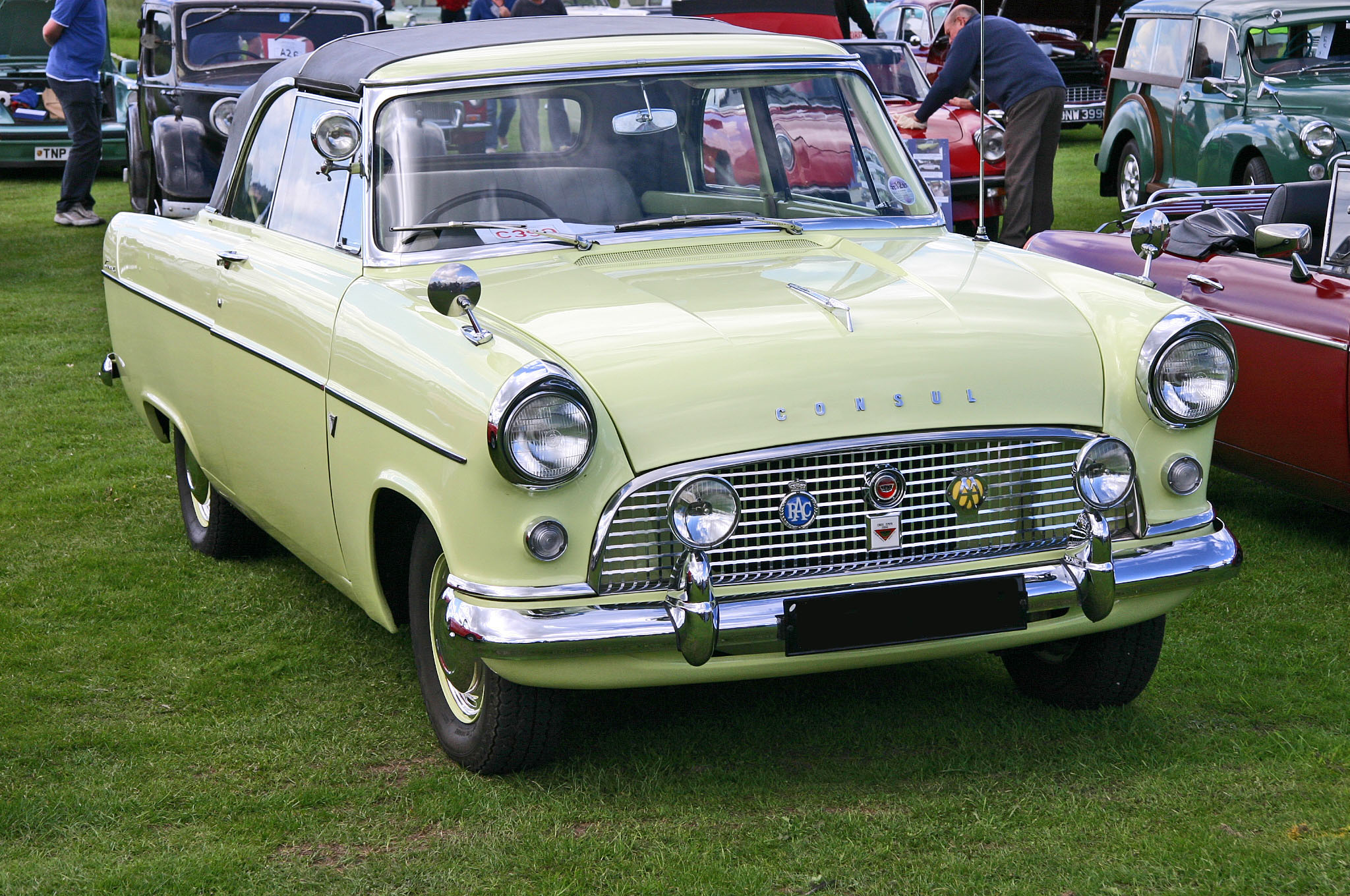
Carbodies Ford Consul Convertible

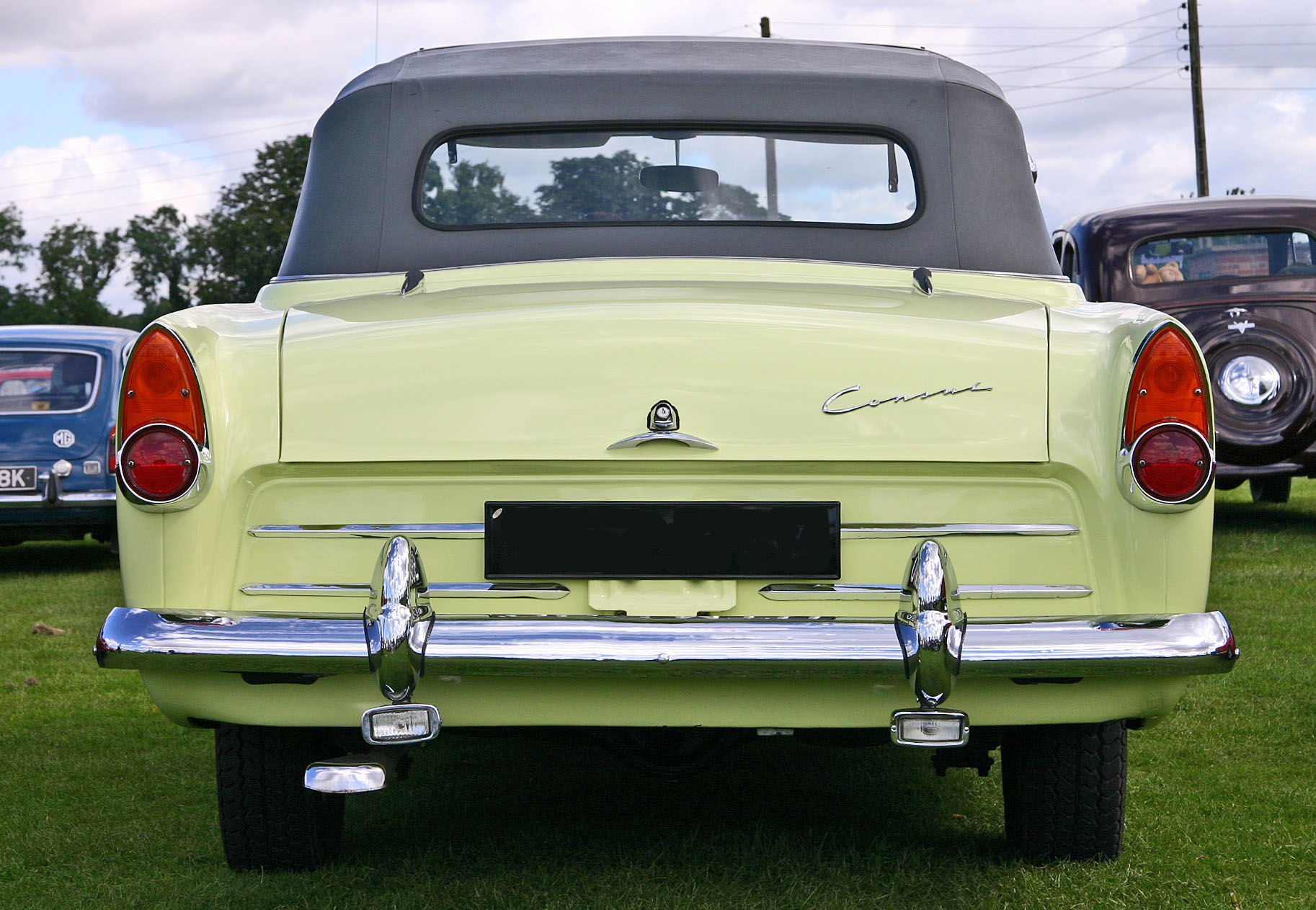
Carbodies Ford Consul Convertible

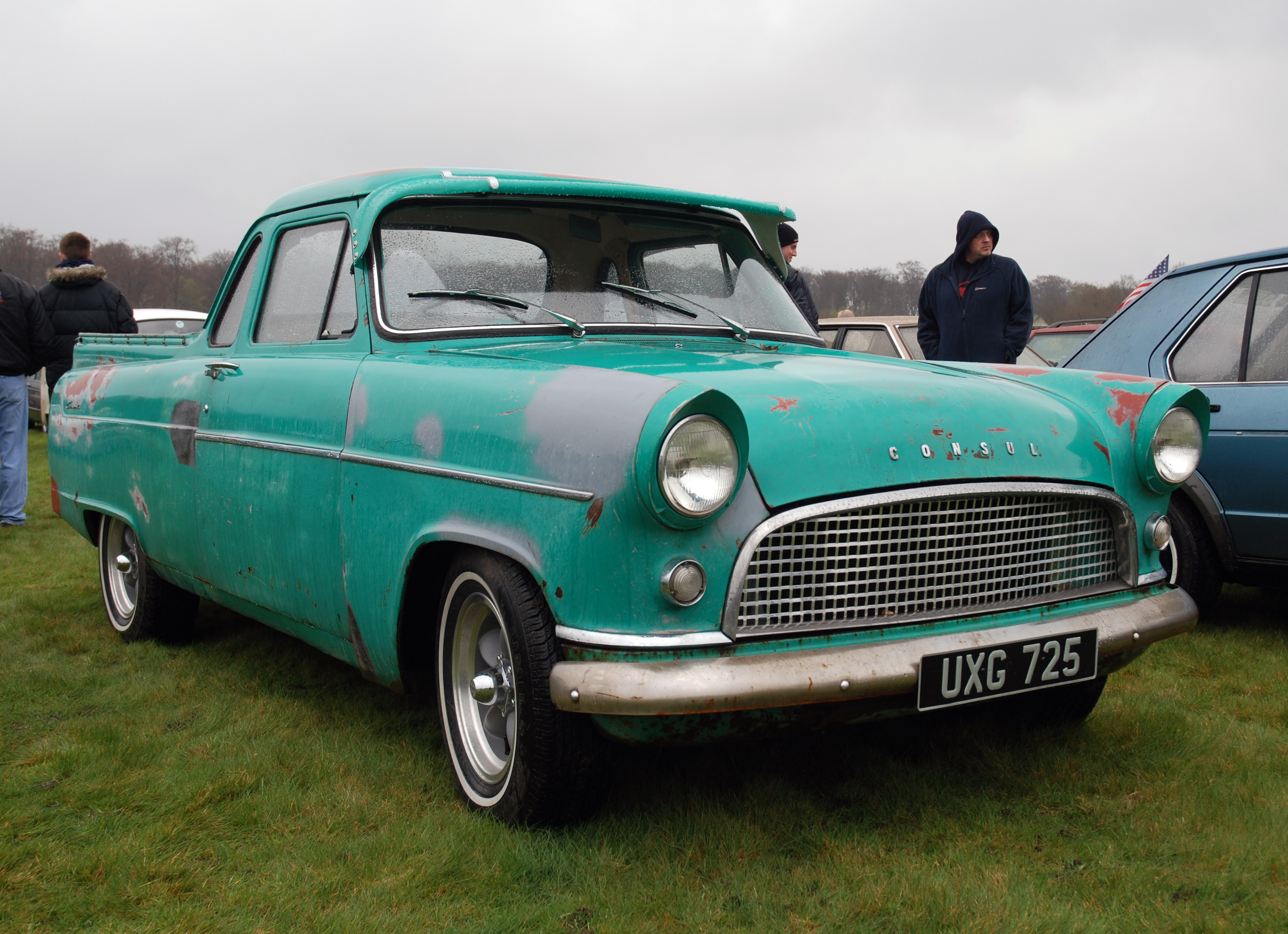
Australian developed Ford Consul MkII Coupe Utility (with after-market wheels)

== Ford Consul (Granada Mark I based: 1972–1975) ==
Ford Consul (Granada Mark I based)
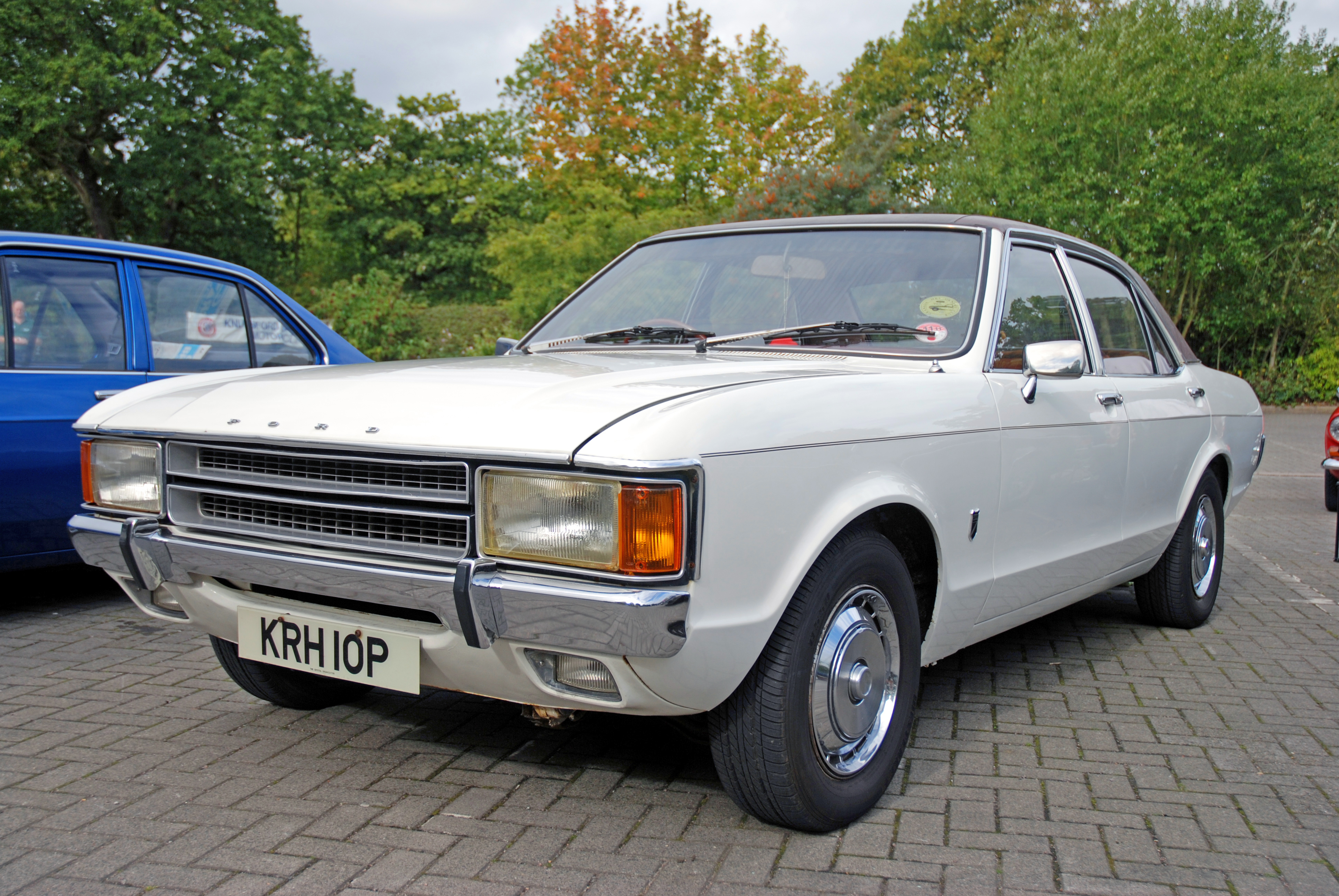
- Ford Consul four-door saloon (1972–75)

Overview
- Production: 1972–1975
- Assembly: West Germany: Cologne; United Kingdom: Dagenham

Body and chassis
- Body style: 2-door saloon; 4-door saloon; 2-door coupé; 5-door estate
- Related: Ford Granada Mark II

Powertrain
- Engine: 1663 cc Essex V4; 1699 cc Taunus V4; 1993 cc Pinto I4; 1996 cc Essex V4; 2294 cc Cologne V6; 2495 cc Essex V6; 2994 cc Essex V6
- Transmission: 4-speed manual automatic optional

Dimensions
- Wheelbase: 107 in (2,718 mm)
- Length: 180 in (4,572 mm)
- Width: 70 in (1,778 mm)
- Height: 54 in (1,372 mm)

The Ford Consul name was revived in April 1972 for the lower-priced, lower-specification variants of the newly introduced Ford Granada. Developed jointly by Ford Britain and Ford of Germany, the cars were built in Cologne in West Germany and in Dagenham in the United Kingdom. Consul models can be identified by a two-panel cross-mesh grille as opposed to the horizontal chrome bar grille of the Granadas.

Consul, Consul L, and Consul GT models were offered and were available in two-door saloon, four-door saloon, two-door coupé, and five-door estate bodystyles. Unlike the previous Zephyr Estate, the Consul Estate was produced by Ford rather than by an outside contractor.

The 1663 cc Essex V4 and 1996 cc Essex V4 with 77 and 92 hp, respectively, and a 2495 cc Essex V6 with 118 hp (88 kW) were the power units offered in the UK. In addition, the Consul GT was powered by the 2994 cc Essex V6 engine providing 138 hp (103 kW). Because it was less well equipped than the similarly powered Granada, it was about 1 long cwt (110 lb; 51 kg) lighter and correspondingly quicker. In late 1974, the Essex V4 was replaced by the 2.0 litre Pinto engine.

In Germany, the Consul was offered with a choice of German-built Ford engines, starting with the 1699 cc Ford Taunus V4 engine familiar to drivers of the Ford Taunus 17M. The 2.0 litre straight-four and a 2.3 litre Cologne V6 were also available.

The Consul name was discontinued in late 1975 after the UK Court of Appeal ruled that Granada Group could not prevent Ford registering the name Granada as a trademark. The Granada name was then applied to all models.

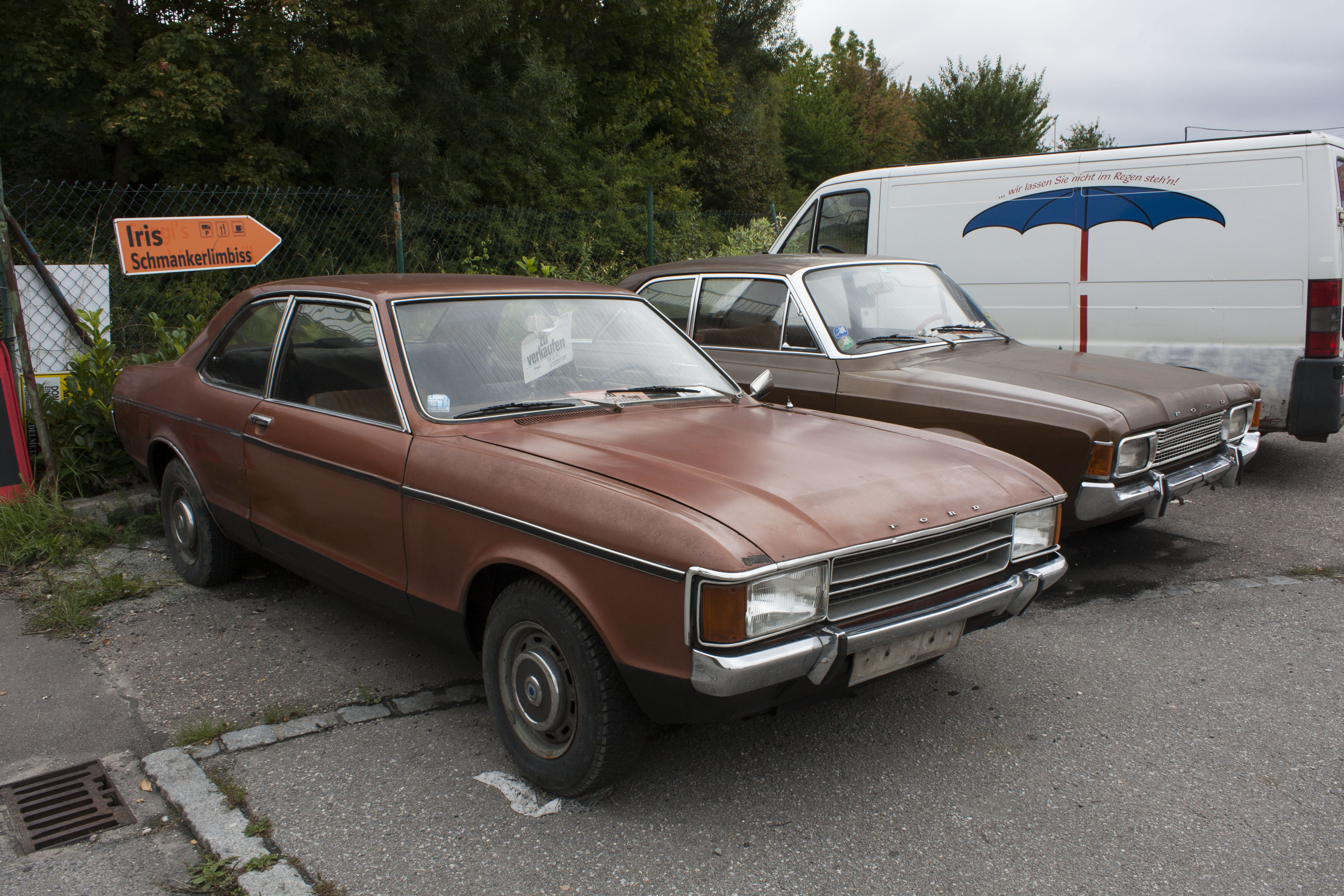
Ford Consul two-door saloon (1972–75)

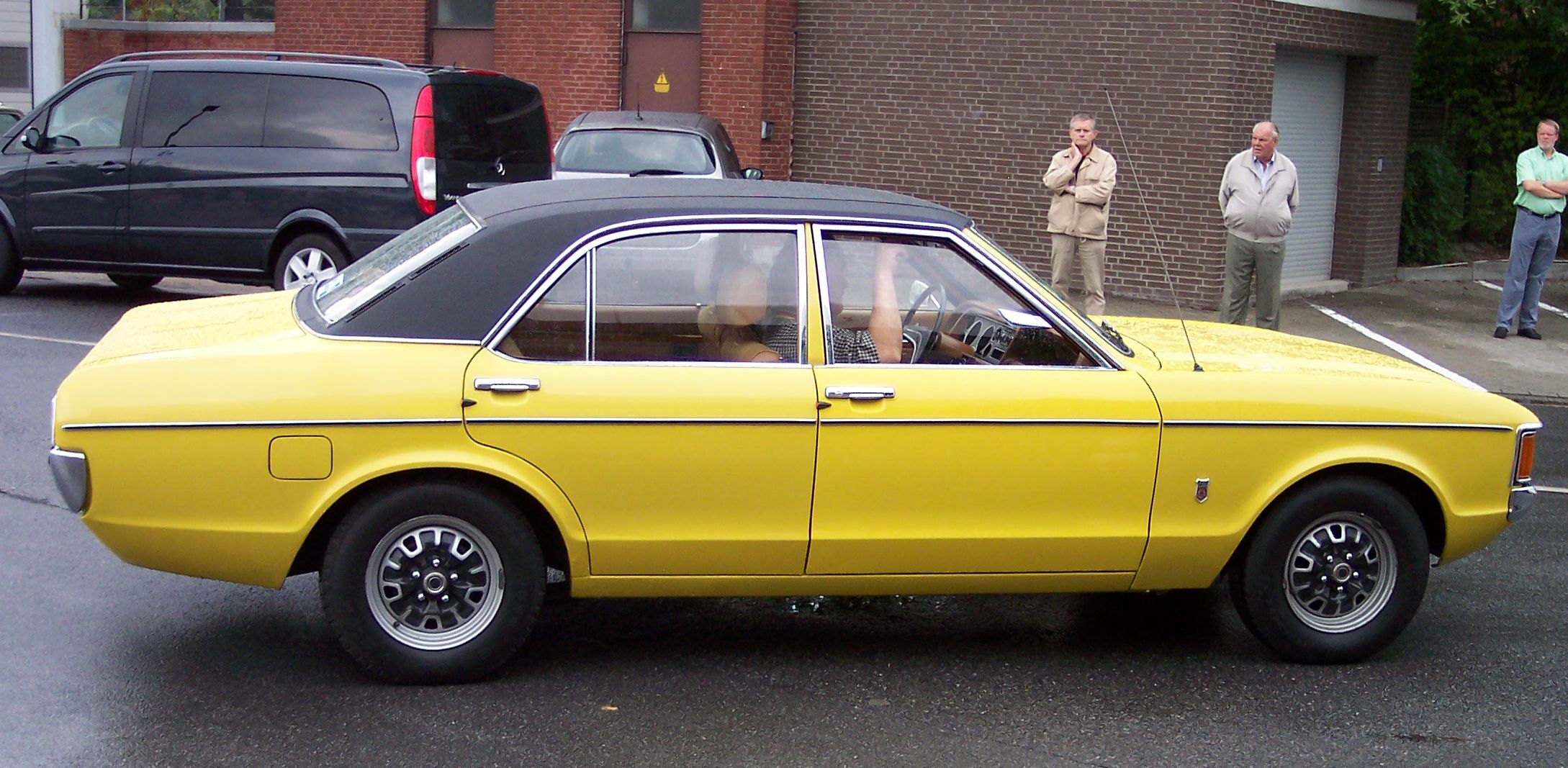
Ford Consul GT four-door saloon (1972-1975)

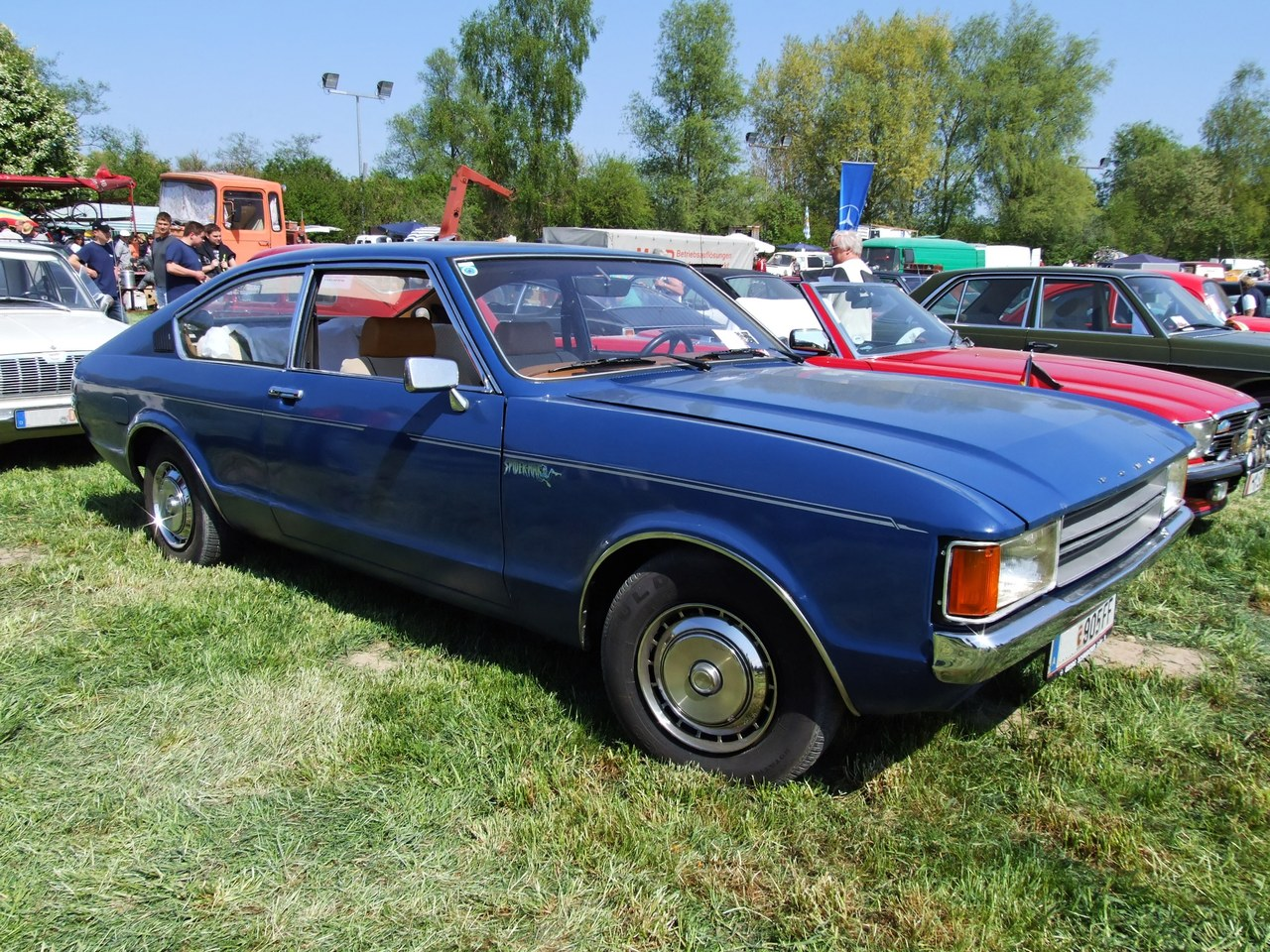
Ford Consul L coupe (1972–75)

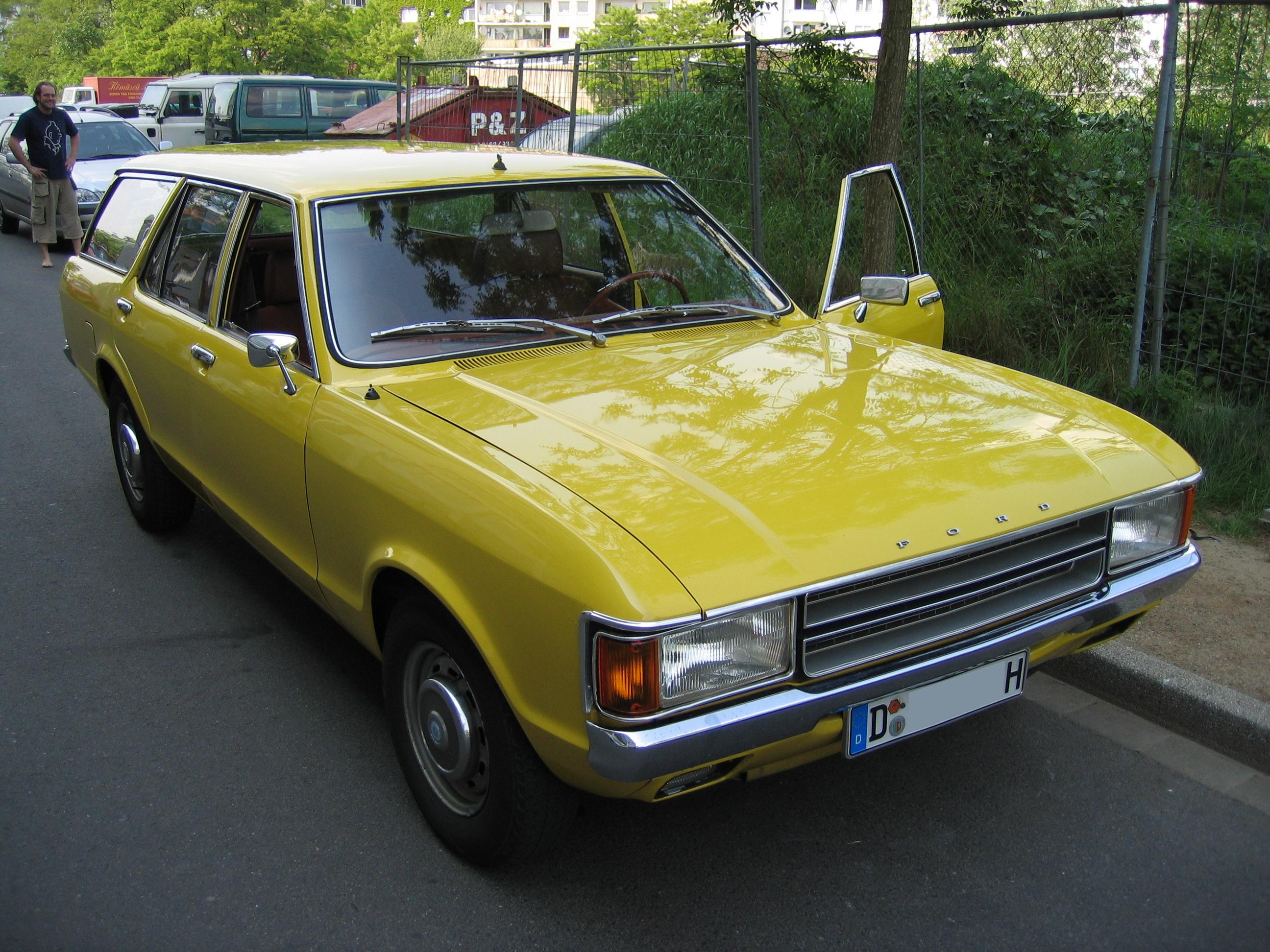
Ford Consul estate (1972–75)

== See also ==
- Ford Consul Capri for the Ford Consul Capri
- Ford Consul Classic for the Ford Consul Classic
- Ford Corsair for the Ford Consul Corsair
- Ford Cortina for the Ford Consul Cortina
