= Ilama =

Ilama or ilama may refer to:

- Ilama (fruit), a tropical tree and fruit
- Ilama, Honduras, a municipality
- Ilama culture, an archaeological culture of Colombia
- Farlen Ilama, Costa Rican football player

== See also ==
- Llama (disambiguation)
