= Lama Lama =

Lama Lama or Lamalama may refer to:

- Lama Lama people, an ethnic group of Australia
- Lama-Lama language, a language of Australia
- Lama Lama National Park, in Australia

== See also ==
- Llama llama (disambiguation)
- Lama (disambiguation)
