= Abbott-Baynes Scud 1 =

British single-seat glider, 1931

Scud 1
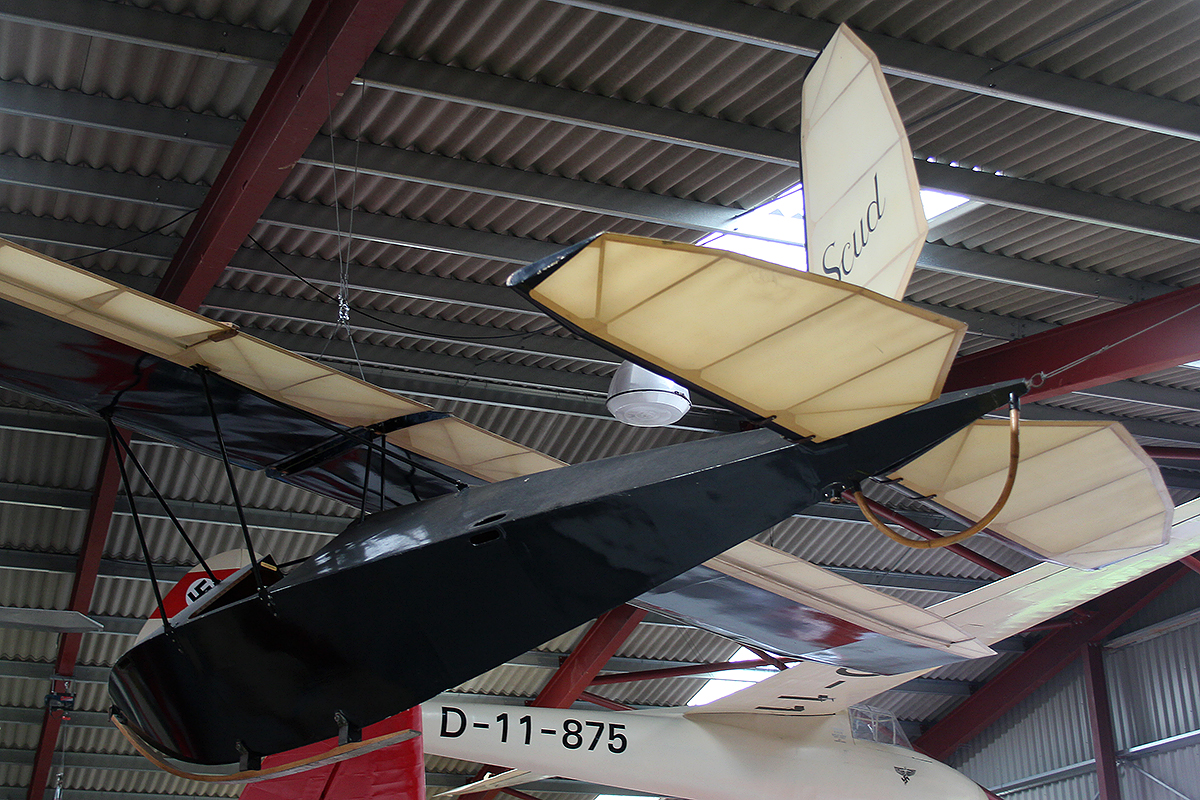
- Scud I Replica at Gliding Heritage Centre

General information
- Type: Single seat glider
- National origin: United Kingdom
- Manufacturer: Abbott-Baynes Sailplanes Ltd
- Designer: L. E. Baynes
- Number built: ≥ 2

History
- First flight: 11 January 1931
- Developed into: Abbott-Baynes Scud 2

The Abbott-Baynes Scud 1 was a parasol-winged single seat glider intended to introduce pilots to soaring flight. It was built in the United Kingdom and first flew in 1931.

== Design and development ==
The Scud was the first of a series of gliders designed by Leslie Baynes, all of which used the same name. At the time of its first flight in 1931 it was referred to as the Brant Scud because the first prototype was built by Brant Aircraft Ltd. of Croydon. Later aircraft were produced by Abbott-Baynes Sailplanes, a company founded for this purpose. It was designed to fill a gap in performance between the primary gliders and the true sailplanes of the day. Thus the Abbott-Baynes Scud 1, as it became known as after the appearance of the Scud 2 in 1932, was capable of soaring and was light and cheap, though its minimum sink speed of just under 1 m/s was higher than the 0.8 m/s or better expected of the competition sailplanes. Compared with them, the Scud's light weight and short span, combined with wing-tip and fuselage hand holds, made it easy for four people to carry on the ground.

The Scud's wooden cantilever parasol wing had constant chord over about 60% of its span, with some taper outboard particularly on the trailing edge. It was built around two spars, with stress bearing plywood skin forward of the rear spar forming a box spar. Aft, the wing and full span ailerons were fabric covered. On the prototype, all flying surfaces were edged with cord, resulting in a scalloped finish. All three all-moving, wood-framed and fabric-covered tail surfaces were identical and interchangeable, making the rudder appear unusually tall. Each surface, mounted on a short stub tube, had a straight leading edge and was tapered on the trailing edge, which had a central cut-out.

The fuselage was also a wooden structure, square in section and built around four ash longerons but unusually orientated with one diagonal vertical. It was plywood skinned throughout, apart from an inevitable break in the upper longeron and in the upper surface skin for the under-wing open cockpit. The wing was mounted by two parallel pairs of thin struts from the mid-fuselage longerons to the two wing spars. The upper longeron loads were carried across the break via the wing structure by two pairs of struts, one well forward and one well aft of the cockpit to the mounting points on the wing spars, together with a near vertical pair just behind the cockpit. A landing skid extending from the nose to below the wing trailing edge was retained by leather straps very close to the lower longeron, with landing forces absorbed by rubber blocks.

Contemporary accounts emphasised the ease with which the Scud with its two piece wing and readily removable tail surfaces could be dismantled for transport.

== Operational history ==
The Scud's first flight was on 11 January 1931 at Totternhoe, piloted by Marcus Manton. By the Summer of 1931 it was in production in the Abbott-Baynes works. Production numbers are uncertain; it is known that a total of 12 Scud 1 and Scud 2 were built here, including Scud 1 BGA 300. Another Scud was built before World War II in the Channel Islands. The Scud 1 in the Brooklands Museum is a replica built by the late Mike Beach.

One Scud crashed early in the aircraft's career. On 8 March 1931 Thomas Lander was killed immediately after a first attempt at a winch launching. A Scud 1 was on display at the Gliding Exhibition held at Islington in May 1931. Over the Summer of 1931 Flight recorded several meetings with Scuds in attendance, such as those at Portsmouth and Balsdean. A Scud continued in service in 1934 with the Guernsey glider club.

== Specifications ==
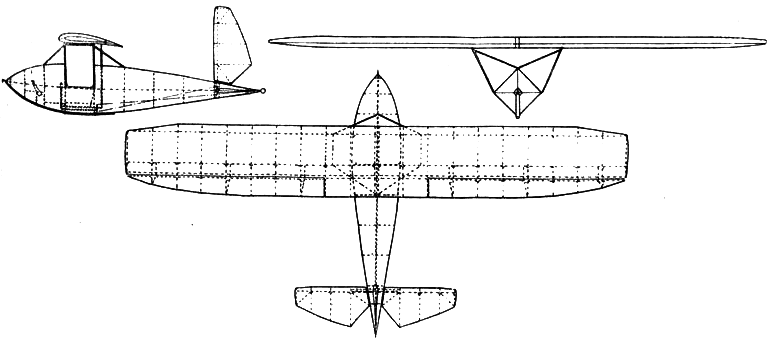
Brant Scud 3-view drawing from l'Aerophile May 1931

Data from British Gliders and Sailplanes

General characteristics

- Crew: 1
- Length: 13 ft 4 in (4.06 m)
- Wingspan: 25 ft 4 in (7.72 m)
- Height: 4 ft 1 in (1.24 m)
- Wing area: 85.0 sq ft (7.90 m^{2}) gross
- Aspect ratio: 7.5
- Airfoil: modified Gŏttingen 535
- Empty weight: 103 lb (47 kg)
- Gross weight: 253 lb (115 kg)

Performance

- Rate of sink: 193 ft/min (0.98 m/s) minimum, at 30-35 mph (48-56 km/h)
- Lift-to-drag: 15 maximum
- Wing loading: 2.98 lb/sq ft (14.5 kg/m^{2})
