= Lammas Limited =

Lammas Limited was a manufacturer of motor cars from 1936 to 1938 based in Sunbury-on-Thames, UK. Their cars were built on a chassis bought in from Graham in the United States, the cars being known as Lammas-Graham. Approximately 30 cars were made.

The engines were also from Graham and were supercharged 3562 cc 6-cylinder side-valve units with a special alloy cylinder head and SU carburettor. Unlike the American originals, 12-volt electrics were used.

Coachwork was bought in and was a choice of a sports saloon version from Carlton or Bertelli, a drophead coupé from Abbott or a sports tourer from Bertelli. The cars cost between £620 and £695.

== See also ==
- List of car manufacturers of the United Kingdom
