= Lama (name) =

Lama (/ ˈlɛmə/ LEM-ah; Arabic: لمى ,لما, lamá) is a common Arabic female given first name originating in Arabic poetry. Its specific definition is debated and the word itself is not a synonym to any other Arabic word. One definition is "lips that are dark like the color of a sunset."

Notable Arab women with the name Lama include:

- Lama Abu-Odeh (born 1962), Jordanian legal scholar
- Lama Hasan (born 1973), British journalist
- Lama Hattab (born 1980), Jordanian athlete
- Lama Salam (born 1961), Lebanese politician Tammam Salam's wife
- Lama bint Turki Al Saud, Saudi royal

== See also ==
- Lama (disambiguation)
