= Llamas (disambiguation) =

Llamas are domesticated South American camelids.

Llamas may also refer to:

== People ==
- Ale Llamas (born 1998), Spanish footballer
- Alejandra Llamas (born 1970), Mexican-American author
- Alfonso Cabello Llamas (born 1993), Spanish Paralympic cyclist
- Andrés Llamas (born 1998), Italian footballer
- Armando Llamas (1950-2003), Spanish playwright who worked with Philippe Adrien
- Brandon Thomas Llamas (born 1995), Spanish footballer
- César Llamas (born 1985), Paraguayan footballer
- Diego Osorio de Escobar y Llamas (1608-1673), Spanish Roman Catholic bishop
- Eva Llamas (born 1992), Spanish footballer
- Franco Llamas (born 1990), Argentine footballer
- Francisco Llamas, Spanish painter
- Guillermo Anaya Llamas (born 1968), Mexican politician
- Horacio Llamas (born 1973), Mexican basketball player
- José Ángel Llamas (born 1966), former Mexican telenovela actor
- José Antonio Llamas (born 1985), Spanish footballer
- Lorena Llamas (born 1967), Spanish former professional racing cyclist
- Luis Francisco García Llamas (born 1964), Mexican footballer
- Maluca Llamas (born 1962), Mexican tennis player
- María Eugenia Llamas (1944-2014), Mexican actress.
- Mario Llamas (1920-2014), Mexican tennis player
- Pedro González Llamas, Spanish general
- Sergio Llamas (born 1993), Spanish footballer
- Tom Llamas, journalist

== Places ==
- Llamas, Asturias, a Spanish province
- Llamas de la Ribera, a Spanish city
- F. Llamas Street, in the Philippines

== Other uses ==
- Sanchez-Llamas v. Oregon, 2006 American case
- "Llamas", a sketch from Monty Python's Flying Circus and Monty Python Live at Drury Lane

== See also ==
- Llama (disambiguation)
- The High Llamas, British rock group
