= Llama District =

The Llama District refers to:

- Mariscal Luzuriaga Province, in the Ancash Region, Peru
- In the Cajamarca Region, the Chota Province of Peru
