= Lamas (surname) =

Lamas is a surname. Notable people with the surname include:

- Carlos Saavedra Lamas (1878–1959), Argentine academic and politician
- Fernando Lamas (1915–1982), Argentine actor and director
- Joe Lamas (1916–1996), American football player
- José Ángel Lamas (1775–1814), Venezuelan composer
- Lorenzo Lamas (born 1958), American actor
- Julio Lamas (born 1964), Argentine basketball coach
- Pedro Lamas Baliero, Uruguayan chess master
- Ricardo Lamas (born 1982), American mixed martial artist
- Shayne Lamas (born 1985), American actress
