= Lamma =

Lamma may refer to:

- Lambda, a letter of the Greek alphabet
- Lamma Island, Hong Kong
- a dialect of the Western Pantar language of Indonesia
- Lamma, Sumerian name for Lamassu, a protective female deity
- LAMMA show, an agricultural show in the United Kingdom
- LAMMA, abbreviation for laser microprobe mass analyzer

== See also ==
- Lammas (disambiguation)
