= Lama-ye Olya =

Lama-ye Olya لماعليا
- Village
- Location within Iran
- Coordinates: 31°02′54″N 51°12′59″E
- Country: Iran
- Province: Kohgiluyeh and Boyer-Ahmad
- County: Dana
- Bakhsh: Pataveh
- Rural District: Sadat Mahmudi

Population (2006)
  - Total: 356
- Time zone: UTC+3:30 (IRST)
  - Summer (DST): UTC+4:30 (IRDT)

Lama-ye Olya (Persian: لماعليا, also Romanized as Lamā-ye ‘Olyā) is a village in Sadat Mahmudi Rural District, Pataveh District, Dana County, Kohgiluyeh and Boyer-Ahmad Province, Iran. At the 2006 census, its population was 356, in 68 families.
