= E. D. Abbott Ltd =

British coachbuilding business

Abbott of Farnham, E D Abbott Limited was a British coachbuilding business based in Farnham, Surrey, trading under that name from 1929. A major part of their output was under sub-contract to motor vehicle manufacturers. The business closed in 1972.

== Origin ==
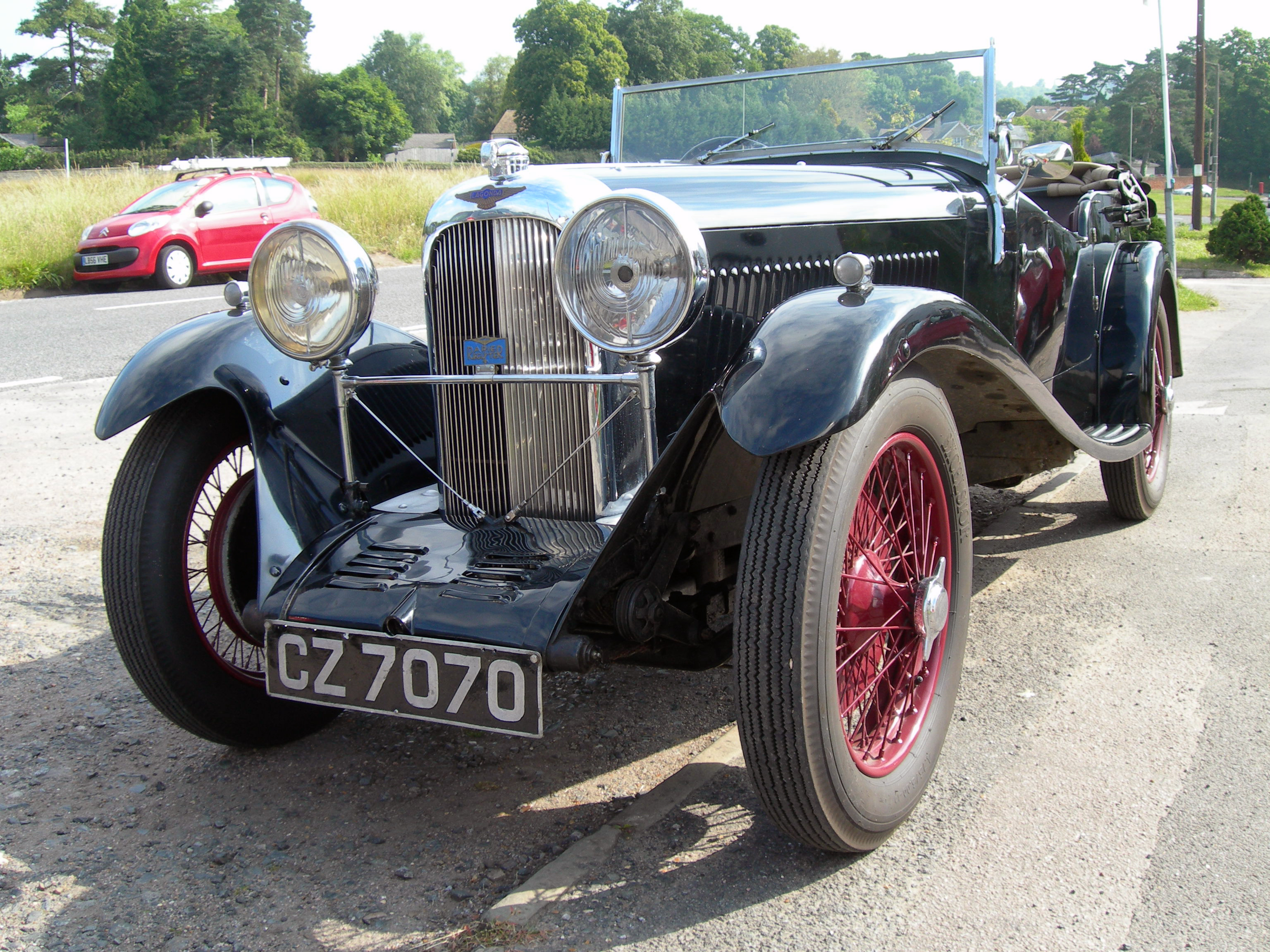
Lagonda Rapier

Edward Dixon Abbott (b. 1898) had been employed in the design department of Wolseley Motors before he joined the coachbuilders Page and Hunt who had started operations in 1920. Abbott became their London Sales Manager and when Page and Hunt's business failed in 1929 he took over their Farnham works, forming a new company using his own name.

Many of the early orders were for commercial vehicles, which kept the business afloat during the worst of the depression, but some car body making continued. From 1931 Abbott took a stand each year at the London Motor Show. Cars fitted with bodies included the Austin 7, Daimlers and Talbots.

== Sailplanes ==
Abbott built a glider called the Farnham Sailplane and in 1931 the company established a subsidiary Abbott-Baynes Sailplanes Ltd to build more sailplanes. The parent company continued to sell and advertise the sailplanes.

== Lagonda ==
In 1934 Abbott won a major contract from Lagonda to provide all the bodies for the new small Rapier and work from Frazer-Nash for coachwork on imported BMW chassis.

During the second world war the company manufactured experimental radar aerials for the Royal Aircraft Establishment.

== Postwar ==
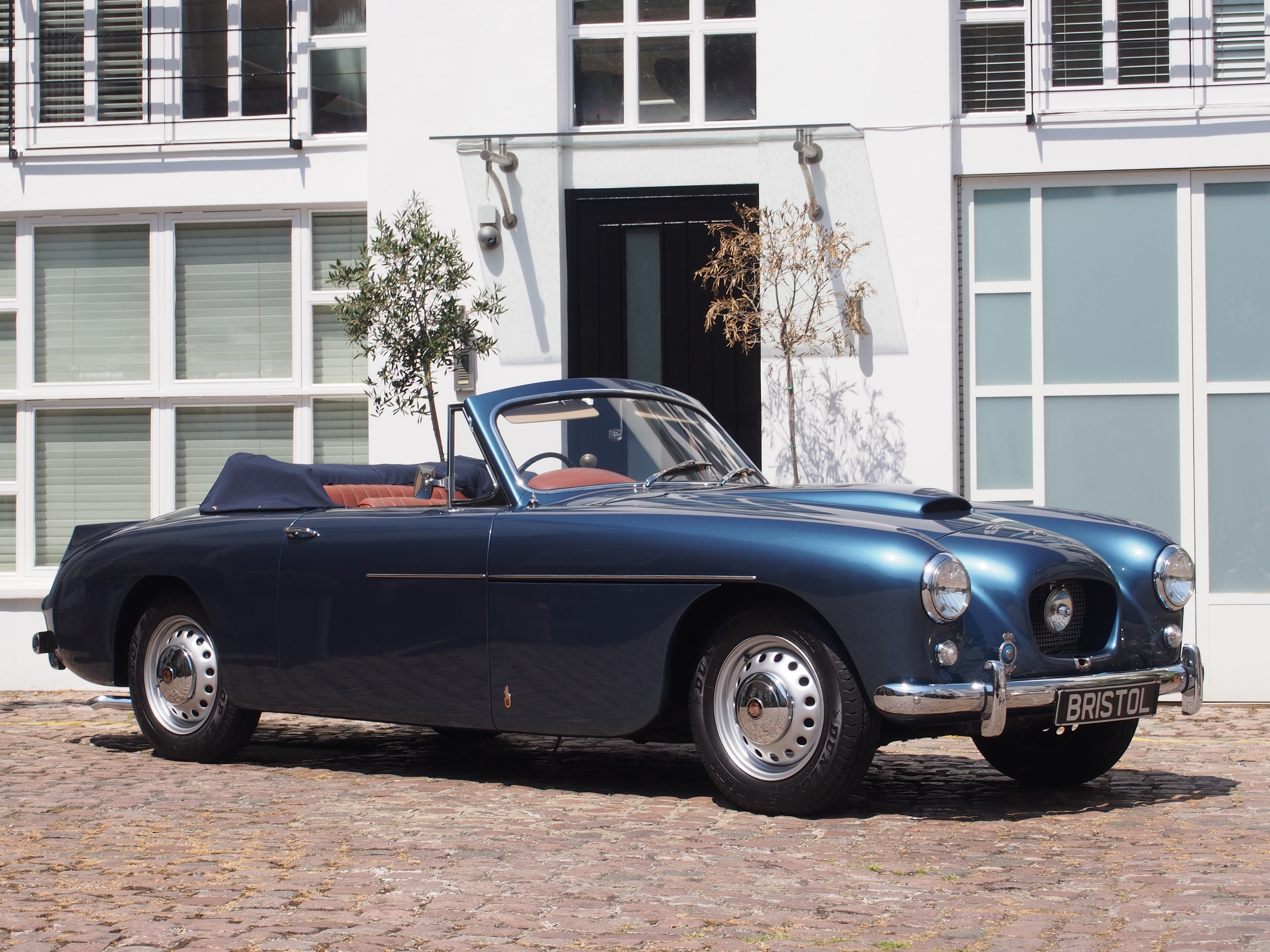
ED Abbott built the bodies for the drophead coupe version of the Bristol 405

After World War 2 the company restarted its coachbuilding activities, building production runs of coupés for Sunbeam-Talbot and Healey, as well as some special bodies for Jowett, Bentley and Lanchester.

Large orders came from Ford for estate car versions of their Consul and Zephyr models, which kept the firm in business during the late 1950s and early 1960s, after which Ford estate production (aside from the Corsair) was done by Ford themselves as the level of demand had shown mass production was viable.

The days of the special coachbuilding industry were numbered and orders declined through the 1960s; the company finally closed in 1972.

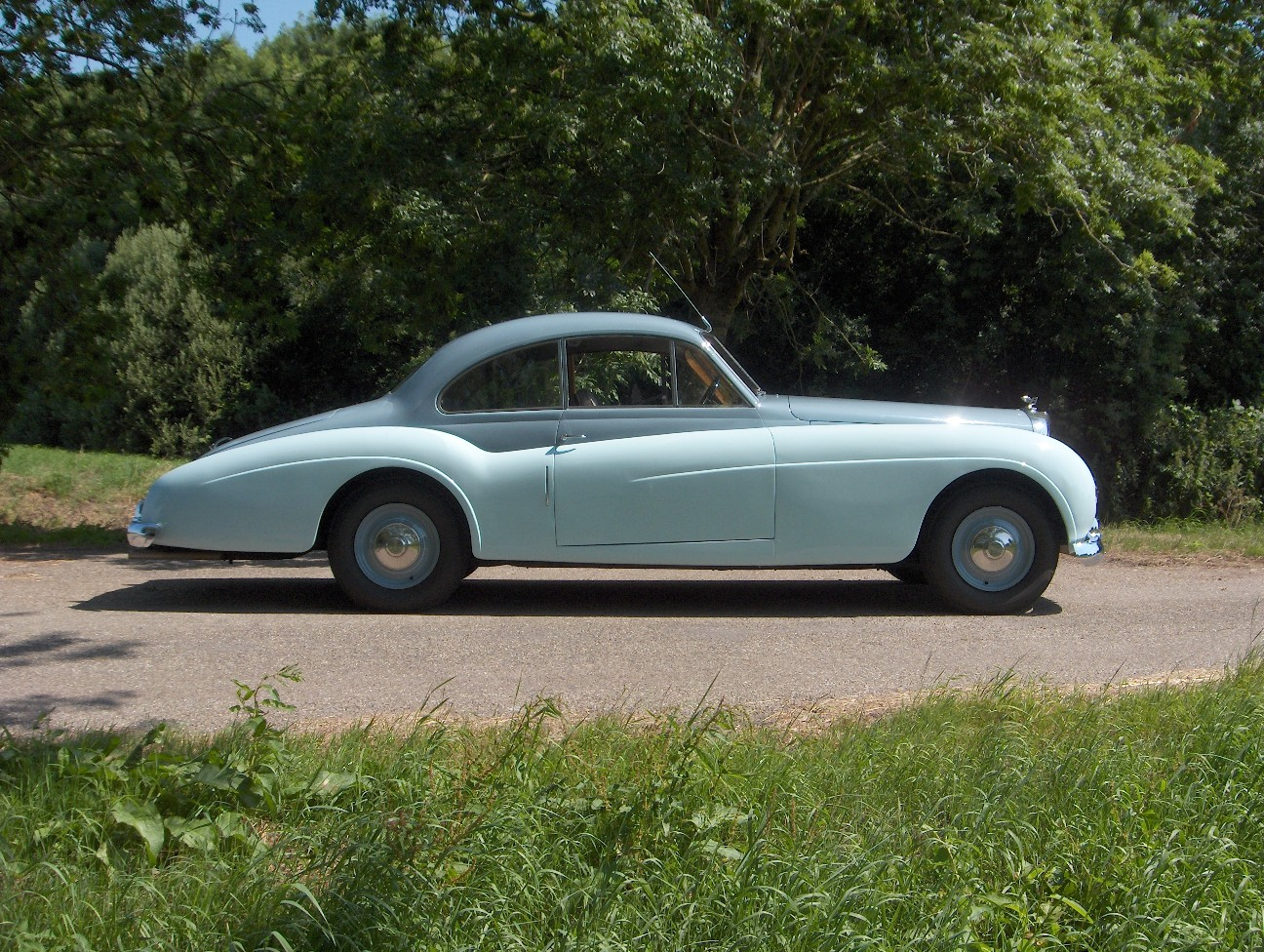
Bentley coupé 1953

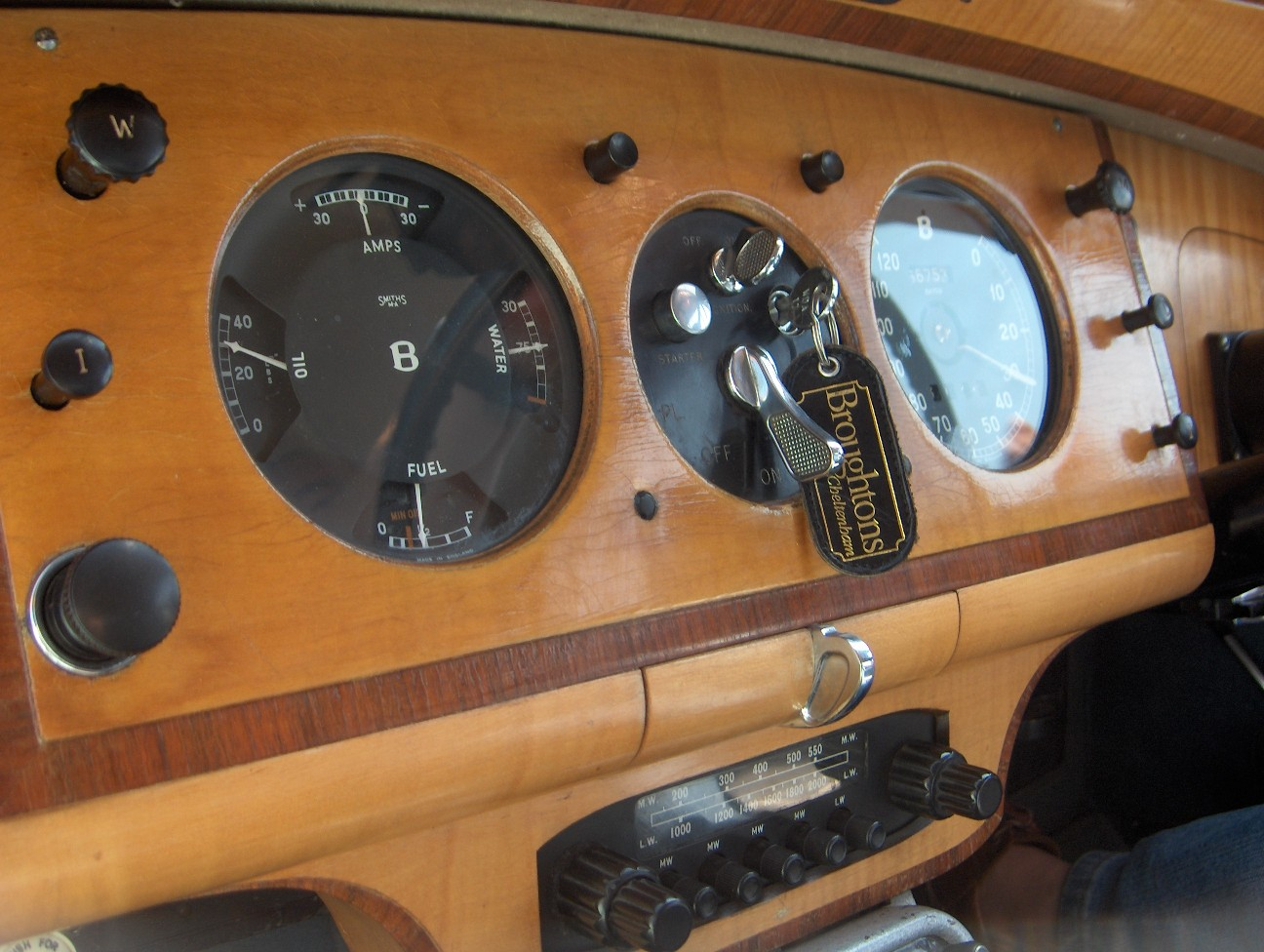
Bentley instrument panel

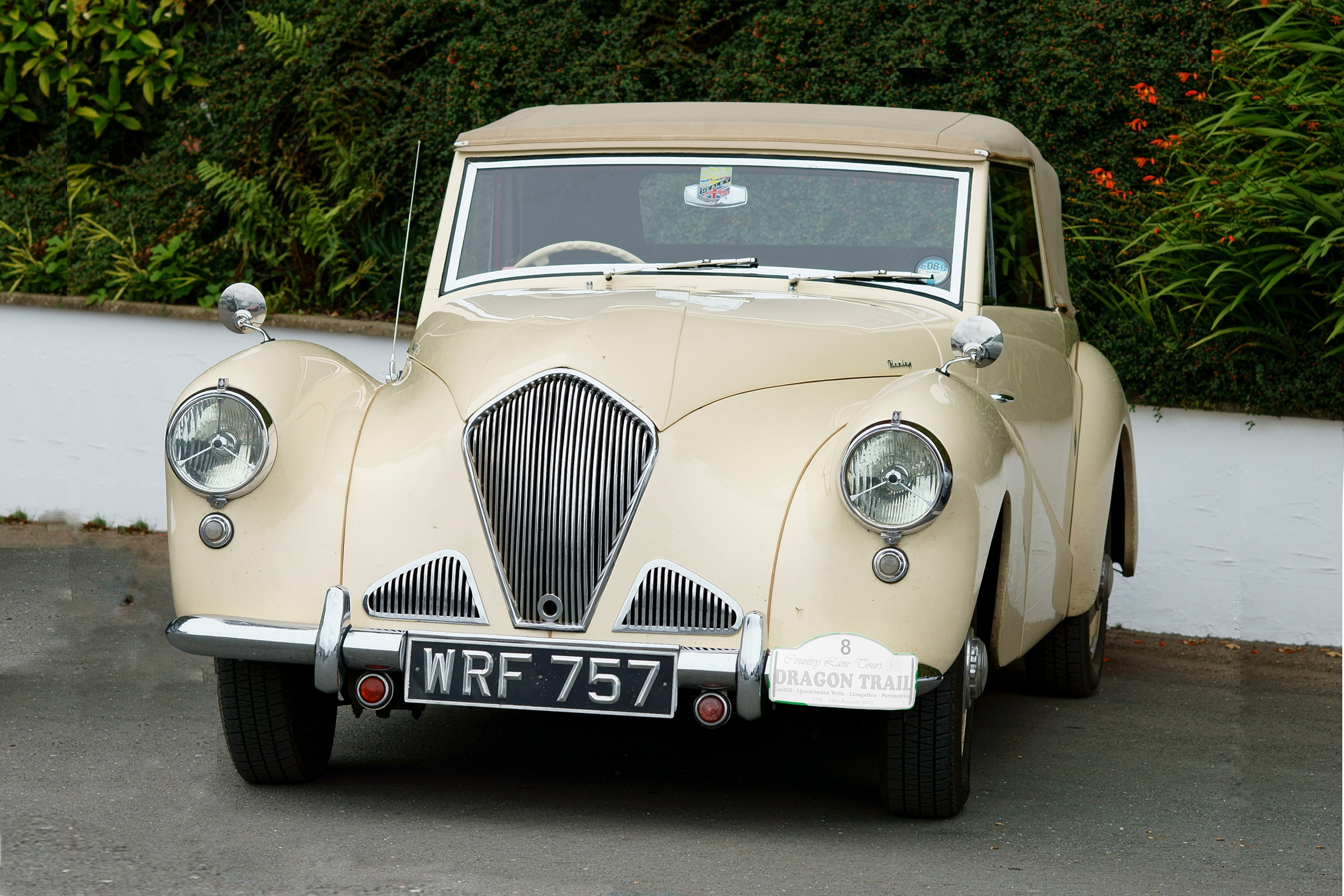
Healey Abbott

== Farnham Estates for Ford ==
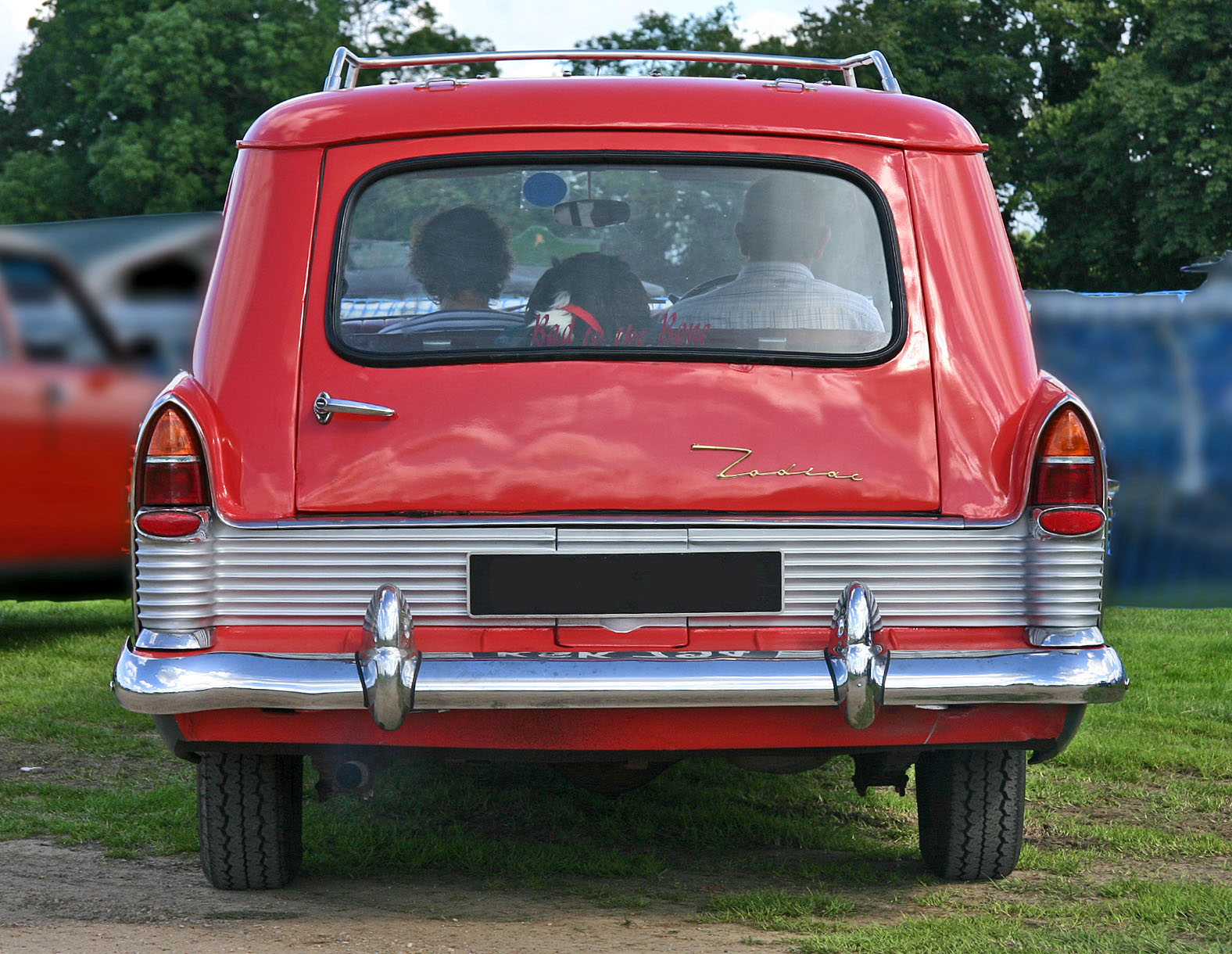
Zodiac MkII by Abbott

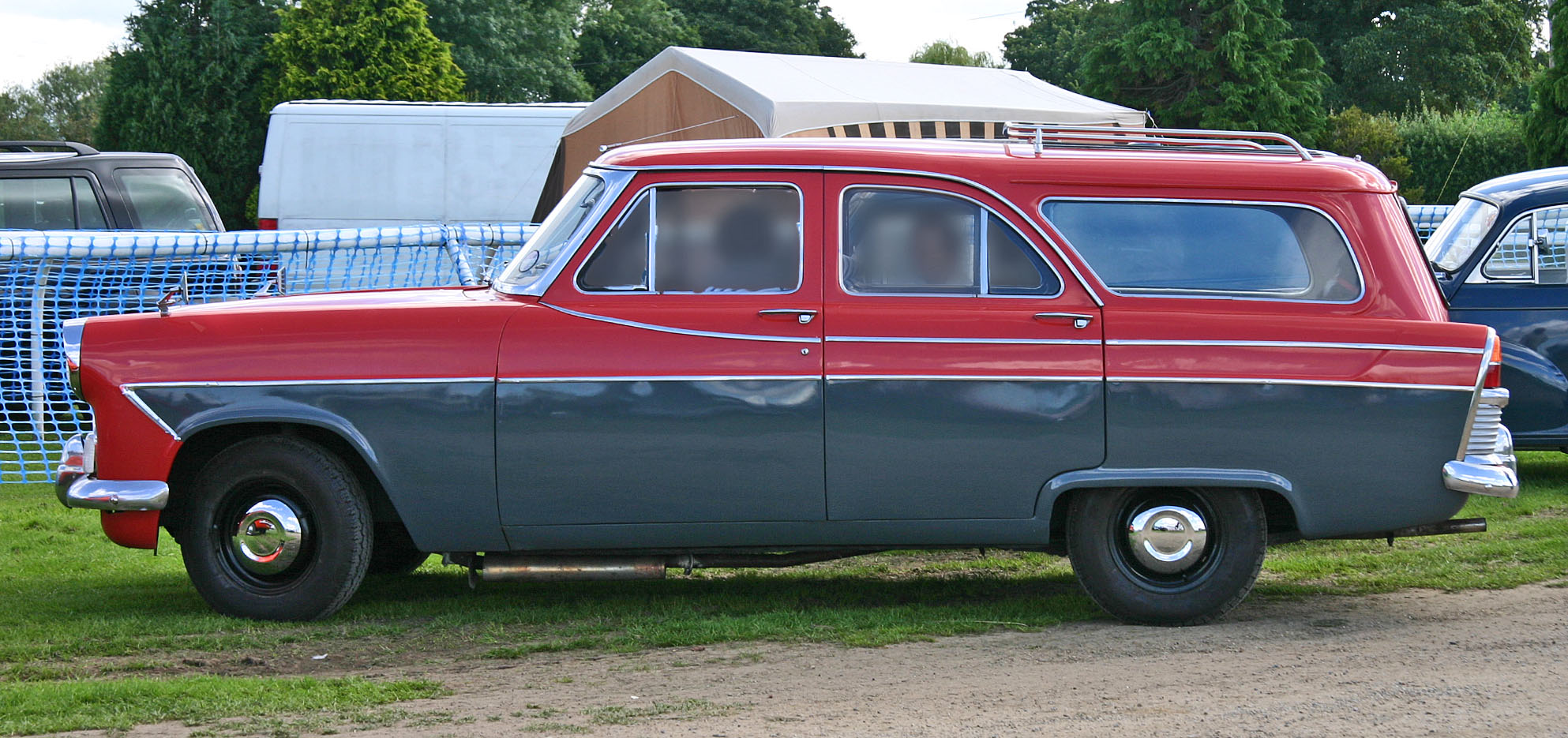
Zodiac MkII conversion

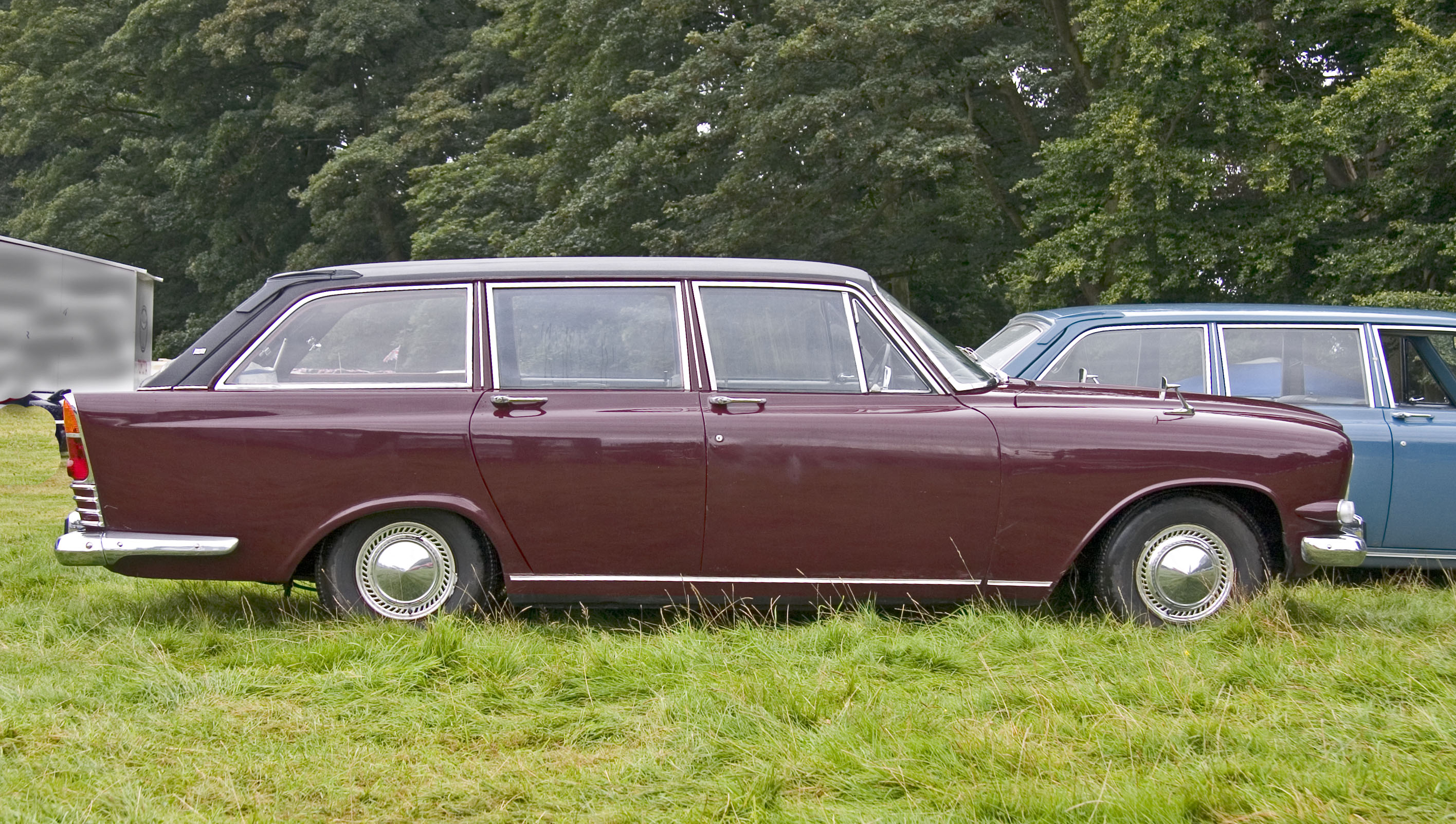
Ford Zephyr 6 conversion

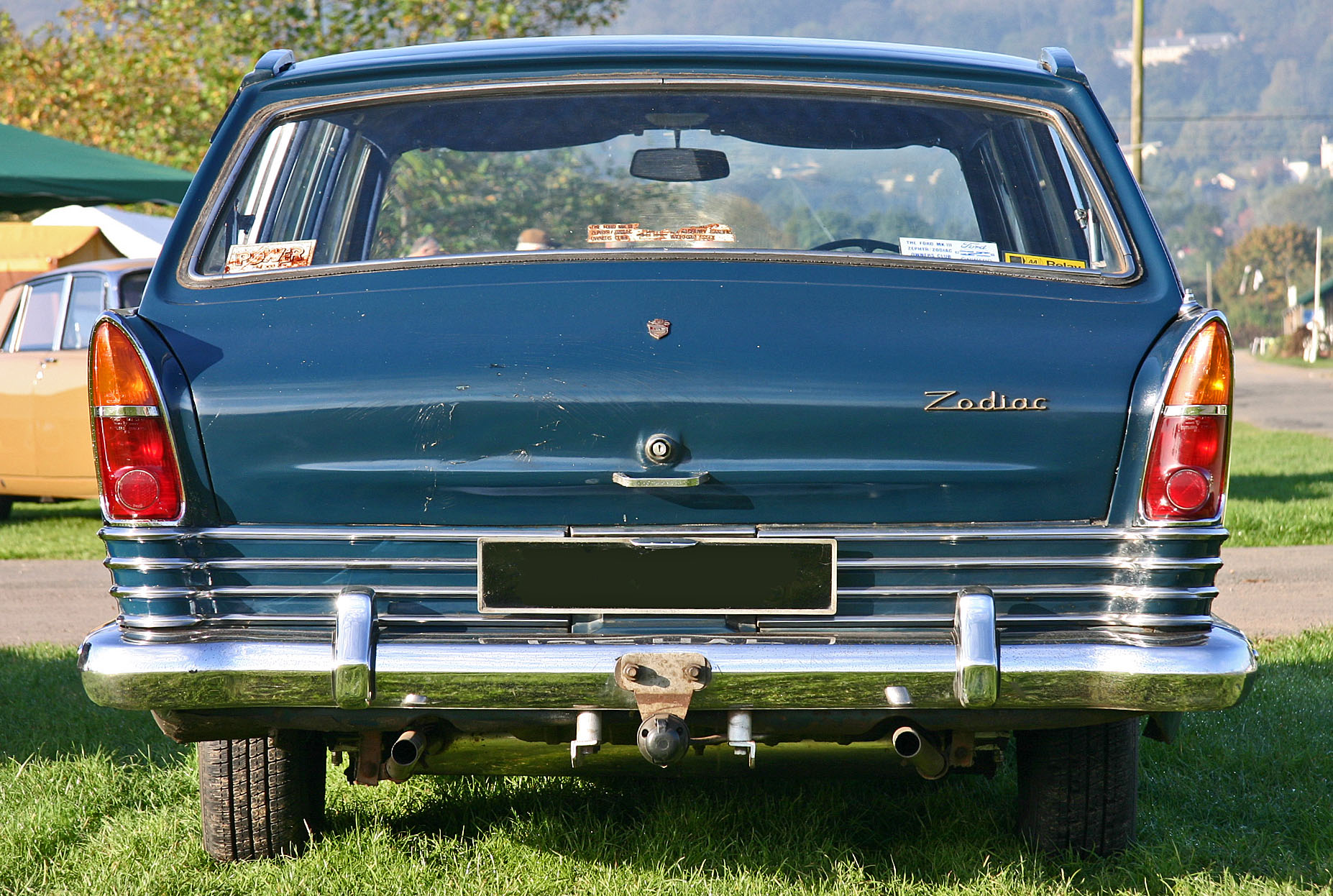
Ford Zodiac MkIII by Abbott
