= Lammas School =

Lammas School & Sixth Form

Location
- 150 Seymour Road; Leyton; London, E10 7LX; England
- Coordinates: 51°33′58″N 0°01′31″W

Information
- Type: Academy
- Local authority: Waltham Forest
- Trust: The Griffin Schools Trust
- Department for Education URN: 145708 Tables
- Ofsted: Reports
- Head of school: Sarah Sawtell
- Executive headteacher: Mark Bland
- Gender: Coeducational
- Age: 11 to 16
- Enrolment: 900
- Website: https://www.lammas-gst.org/

Lammas School is a coeducational secondary school and sixth form located in Leyton area of the London Borough of Waltham Forest, England.

Previously a community school administered by Waltham Forest London Borough Council, in December 2018 Lammas School converted to academy status. The school is now sponsored by The Griffin Schools Trust.
