= Lama-ye Sofla =

Lama-ye Sofla لماسفلي
- Village
- Location within Iran
- Coordinates: 31°02′55″N 51°12′40″E
- Country: Iran
- Province: Kohgiluyeh and Boyer-Ahmad
- County: Dana
- Bakhsh: Pataveh
- Rural District: Sadat Mahmudi

Population (2006)
  - Total: 311
- Time zone: UTC+3:30 (IRST)
  - Summer (DST): UTC+4:30 (IRDT)

Lama-ye Sofla (Persian: لماسفلي, also Romanized as Lamā-ye Soflá) is a village in Sadat Mahmudi Rural District, Pataveh District, Dana County, Kohgiluyeh and Boyer-Ahmad Province, Iran. In 2006, its population was 311, spread across 61 families.
