= Latin American Motorcycle Association =

International organization

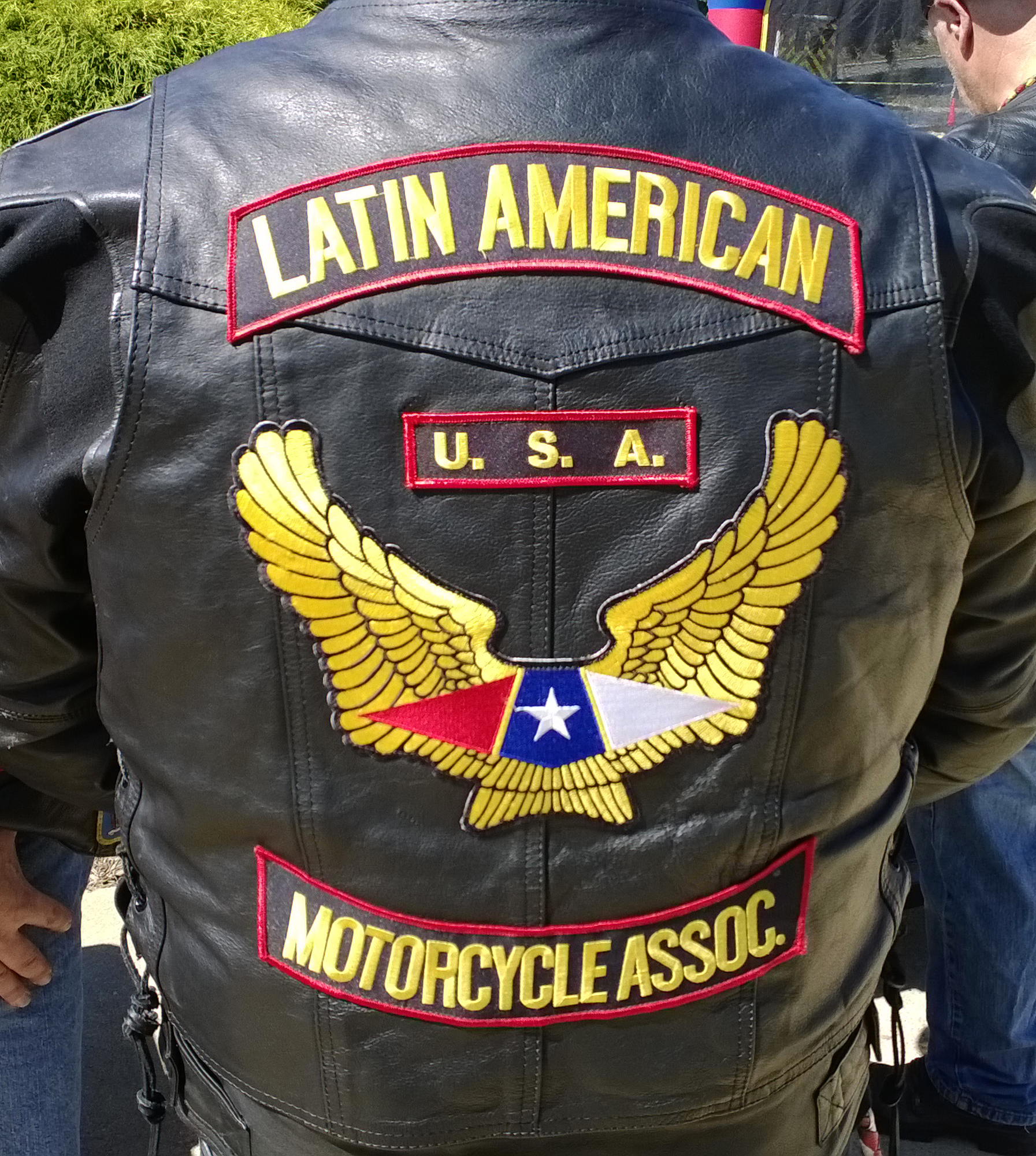
- Founded: 1977; 49 years ago
- Founded at: Chicago, Illinois, U.S.
- Region served: International

The Latin American Motorcycle Association (otherwise known as L.A.M.A.) was founded on June 12, 1977 in Chicago, Illinois, U.S.A.

L.A.M.A. is an international organization that is recognized as one of the most active long-distance motorcycle riding clubs in the world.

== History ==
Founded on June 12, 1977, by Puerto Rican Mario Nieves. L.A.M.A. operated as a single chapter in Chicago's Humboldt Park neighborhood for 18 years. In 1995, the L.A.M.A. Miami chapter was founded, and one year later, L.A.M.A. grew to become a national association with the election of the organization's first National President Mario Nieves. LAMA became an international association in June of 1999 after electing Mario Nieves as its first International President. He had started LAMA chapters in Puerto Rico, Mexico and Cuba.

In 2013, L.A.M.A. was reported to have chapters in Argentina, Australia, Cuba, Mexico, Spain, Uruguay, Venezuela, and U.S. states and territories including Florida and Puerto Rico.

== Membership ==
As of mid-2024, LAMA exceeded 10,000 riding members in 220 chapters worldwide.
