= List of gliders (E) =

This is a list of gliders/sailplanes of the world, (this reference lists all gliders with references, where available) Note: Any aircraft can glide for a short time, but gliders are designed to glide for longer.

== E ==
=== Edgars (glider constructor) ===
(Latvia)

- Edgars Laksevics

=== Edgley ===
(Edgley Sailplanes Ltd / (Edgley Aeronautics Ltd) / John Edgley)

- Edgley EA-9 Optimist

=== EEL ===
(Entwicklung und Erprobung von Leichtflugzeugen)

- EEL ULF 1
- EEL ULF 2

=== EFF ===
(Entwicklungsgemeinschaft für Flugzeugbau)

- EFF Prometheus 1
- EFF Prometheus 19
- EFF Prometheus 12
- EFF Prometheus PV

=== EFW ===
(Eidgenössische FlugzeugWerke Emmen)

- EFW N-20.01

=== Eggleton (glider constructor) ===
- Eggleton 1912 glider

=== EIA ===
(Escuela de Ingeniería Aeronáutica - school of aeronautical engineering)

- EIA Biplaza
- EIA Monoplaza

=== Eiri-Avion O/Y ===
See PIK.

=== Ek-Bader ===
(R. Ek & H. G. Bader Wagonfabrik Fuchs, Heidelberg)

- Heidelberg Kurpfalz Sauzahn

=== Ekolot ===
(PPHU Ekolot, Krosno, Poland)

- Ekolot JK 01A Elf

=== Elżanowski ===
(Z. Elżanowski)

- Elżanowski ZE-1 Cytrynka (Cytrynka – lemon) – 'Start' Aviation Circle

=== Elan ===
(Elan Tovarna Sportnega Orodja N.SOL.O)

- DG-100 Elan
- DG-101 Elan
- DG-300 Elan
- DG-300 Club Elan
- DG-300 Elan Acro
- DG-303 Elan

=== Eliferov ===
- Eliferov Aviafak 1 – Елиферов Авиафак 1

=== Ellehammer ===
(Jacob Ellehammer, Denmark)

- Ellehammer N°1
- Ellehammer N°3

=== Elliotts of Newbury ===
- Elliotts Primary EoN
- EoN Type 5 Olympia 1
- EoN Type 5 Olympia 2
- EoN Type 5 Olympia 3
- EoN Type 5 Olympia 4
- EoN Type 5 Olympia 401
- EoN Type 5 Olympia 402
- EoN Type 6 Olympia 403
- EoN Type 6 Olympia 415
- EoN Type 6 Olympia 419
- EoN Type 7 SG-38
- Elliotts Primary EoN Known as Eton TX.1 by R.A.F.
- EoN Type 8 Baby Eon
- EoN Type 9 K.1
- EoN Type 10 Eon 460
- EoN Type 10 Eon 463
- EoN Type 10 Eon 465
- EoN Target – Spec. WT1/RDL.3 in competition with Slingsby T.39; not built.

=== Elsässer-Obrecht-Hügli ===
(E. Elsässer, A. Obrecht & Hügli)

- Elsässer Röbi

=== Elsnic ===
(Ludvík Elsnic)

- Elsnic EL-1
- Elsnic EL-2-M Šedý vlk
- Elsnic EL-2-M Šedý vlk M

=== Elżanowski ===
(Z. Elżanowski)

- Elżanowski ZE-1 Cytrynka

=== EMBRAER ===
(Instituto Tecnológico de Aeronáutica de São José dos Campos / Empresa Brasileira de Aeronáutica)

- Embraer EMB-400 Urupema

=== Emelyanov ===
(V. I. Emelyanov)

- Emelyanov KIM-1 – Емельянов КИМ-1
- Emelyanov KIM-2 – Емельянов КИМ-2
- Emelyanov KIM-3 Stakhanovets – Емельянов КИМ-3 Стахановец
- Emelyanov RV-1 – Емельянов РВ-1 - Рекорд Высоты- 1

=== Engineering Division ===
(Engr Division, McCook Field, Dayton OH; Hampton Roads VA)

- Engineering Division GL-1
- Engineering Division GL-2
- Engineering Division GL-3

=== E.N.S.A.E. ===
- E.N.S.A.E. Farfelu

=== Enser ===
(F.G Enser)

- Enser Mk.1

=== ENSMA ===
(École Nationale Supérieure de Mécanique et Aérotechnique {Société Scientifique de recherche et de Promotion du Planeur Léger})

- ENSMA FS-25 F Cuervo
- ENSMA Two-seater
- Cuervo 2

=== Erfurt ===
(Erfurter Verein für Luftfahrt eV, Erfurt / E. Rommel)

- Erfurt Erfurt

=== Erla ===
(Erla Maschinenfabrik GmbH, Leipzig - Franz Xaver Mehr)

- Erla 6-A
- Erla Me-4 glider
- Erla Me-4a motor glider

=== Espenlaub ===
(Gottlob Espenlaub)

- Espenlaub E-01
- Espenlaub E-02 – designer:Alexander Lippisch
- Espenlaub E-03
- Espenlaub E-04
- Espenlaub E-05
- Espenlaub E-09
- Espenlaub E-11a
- Espenlaub E-12
- Espenlaub E-14
- Espenlaub E-15
- Espenlaub E-15 Rak
- Espenlaub E-32
- Espenlaub E-33
- Espenlaub Motorsegler
- Espenlaub Rakete
- Espenlaub S
- Espenlaub Schleppflugzeug
- Espenlaub Schulflugzeug

=== Esztergom ===
(Esztergom Facility of Pest Area Machine Factory (PGE) - formerly Sportárutermelõ V., Esztergom)

- Esztergom EV-1K Fecske
- Esztergom E-31 Esztergom

=== ETA ===
(ETA Aircraft / Flugtechnik Leichtbau, Braunschweig)

- Eta (glider)

=== Etheridge ===
(S. Day, C. Etheridge & P. Etheridge)

- Etheridge 1933

=== Etrich-Wels ===
(Igo Etrich & Franz Wels)

- Etrich-Wels 1904 kite/glider
- Etrich-Wels 1906 glider – Etrich's Leaf

=== Europa ===
(Europa Management Ltd)

- Europa MG

=== EuroSport ===
- EuroSport Crossover

=== Explorer ===
(Explorer Aircraft Company Inc. / Bill Skliar)

- Explorer PG-1 Aqua Glider a.k.a. Skliar PG-1 Aqua Glider
