= Yemelyanov =

Yemelyanov or Emelyanov (Russian: Емельянов) is a Russian masculine surname, its feminine counterpart is Yemelyanova or Emelyanova. It may refer to

- Dmitri Yemelyanov (born 1972), Russian footballer
- Gennady Yemelyanov (born 1957), Russian politician
- Ivan Yemelyanov (1861–1916), Russian revolutionary
- Konstantin Yemelyanov (born 1970), Russian footballer
- Mikhail Yemelyanov (born 1991), Kazakhstani sprint canoer
- Roman Emelyanov (born 1975), Russian radio and television personality
- Roman Yemelyanov (born 1992), Russian footballer
- Sergei Yemelyanov (born 1981), Russian footballer
- Stanislav Emelyanov (born 1990), Russian race walker
- Vadim Yemelyanov (1942–1977), Soviet boxer
- Viktor Yemelyanov (born 1987), Russian footballer
- Vladimir Yemelyanov (1911–1975), Soviet actor
- Yury Yemelyanov (1937–2026), Russian historian and author

== See also ==
- Emelyanov KIM-3 Stakanovets, Soviet sailplane
