= ULF 2 =

ULF 2 may refer to:

- EEL ULF 2, motorglider
- Space Shuttle mission STS-126
