= Microjet =

Microjet may refer to:

Aviation

- Bede BD-5J, a series of small, single-seat homebuilt aircraft
- Microjet 200, a small jet trainer aircraft built by Microjet SA
- Microturbo, manufacturer of small turbojet engines
- US Microjet LLC, an American manufacturer of very small turbine engines
- SubSonex, a small homebuilt jet built by Sonex Aircraft
- An early term for the type of aircraft now known as Very Light Jets

Other

- MicroJet Technology Co. Ltd, a Taiwanese manufacturer of inkjet printing technology
- A very small rocket fired by a type of hand-held firearm called the Gyrojet
