= Gliding Heritage Centre =

British glider museum

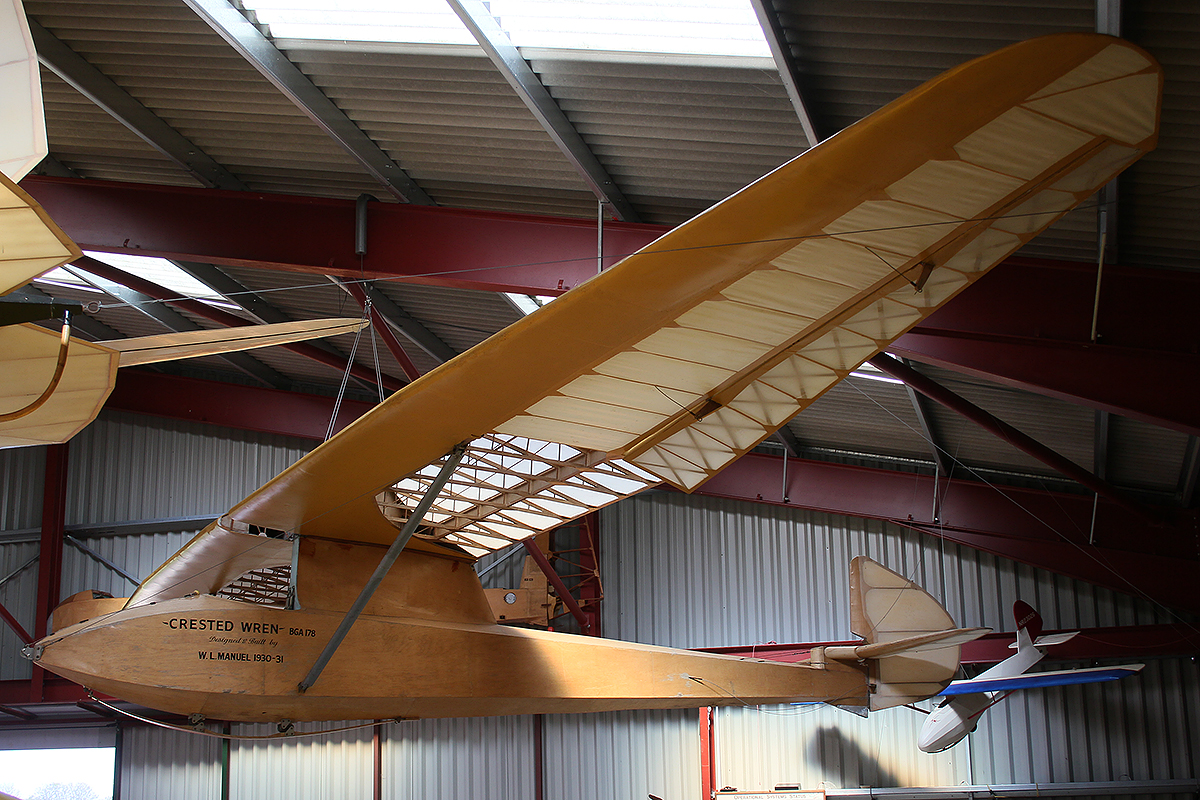
- Manuel Crested Wren on display

- Location within Hampshire
- Location: Lasham Airfield, Hampshire
- Coordinates: 51.1854°N 1.0231°W
- Type: Aviation museum
- Website: www.glidingheritage.org.uk

The Gliding Heritage Centre (GHC) is a collection of vintage gliders based at Lasham Airfield, Hampshire, UK.

== Origins ==
Christopher Wills, the son of Philip Wills, founded the Vintage Glider Club in 1973. He died on 4 May 2011 but left a bequest of £100,000 to build a hangar to house vintage gliders plus his Steinadler. A group of enthusiasts decided to create a Gliding Heritage Centre which could be visited by members of the public in a building called The Chris Wills Memorial Hangar. It is a registered charity No 1148972.

After raising more money and with much volunteer work, the first hangar was opened on 4 August 2013 during the 41st International Vintage Glider Club rally that was held at Lasham that year. Further fund raising allowed the building of a second hangar to house the ever increasing collection of gliders. Hangar 2 was officially opened on 25 August 2018.

A dedicated workshop was added following a further bequest from Trish Williams. This allows some of the aircraft in the collection to remain airworthy, as well as helping to restore and conserve the rest of the fleet. The workshop is also used for teaching the skills required to restore and repair wooden gliders, as these skills are becoming increasingly scarce. It is planned to add a viewing area in the workshop to allow the public to see work that is being done.

== Collection ==
Public tours of the museum are scheduled at 2:00 every Sunday with the starting point in the club-house of Lasham Gliding Society,.

Type	Manufacturer	Date
Scud-I	Abbott-Baynes (Replica)	1931
Scud-II	Abbott-Baynes	1935
Scud III	Abbott-Baynes	1936
Clarke Chanute	TWK Clarke & Co	1910
EoN Baby	Elliotts of Newbury	1949
EoN Eton	Elliotts of Newbury	1951
Olympia 2b	Elliotts of Newbury	1958
Olympia 460	Elliotts of Newbury	1960
Olympia 463	Elliotts of Newbury	1965
Grunau Baby	Hersteller Flugzeugbau	1952
Lo 100	Wolf Hirth	1953
JSH Scorpion	J. Halford	1977
Weihe	Jacobs Schweyer	1943
Kaiser Ka3	Kaiser	1958
Drone	Kronfeld Ltd	1936
TG-3a	Schweizer	1942
Spalinger S-21h	J. Lemp	1943
Willow Wren	Manuel	1932
Hawk	Manuel	1969
Crested Wren	Manuel	1986
Steinadler MG19A	Oberlerchner	1955
Colditz Cock	Replica	2000
MU13-D	Scheibe	1957
Zugvogel 3b	Scheibe	1963
Zugvogel 3b	Scheibe	1964
Bergfalk 55 - II	Scheibe	1963
KA 6E	Schleicher	1968
Scott Viking 1	Scott Light Aviation	1938
Gull-III	Slingsby	1939
Grasshopper	Slingsby	1953
Grasshopper	Slingsby	1962
T8 Tutor	Slingsby	1946
Prefect T30A	Slingsby	1948
Prefect T30B	Slingsby	1958
Skylark 2	Slingsby	1955
Skylark 3b	Slingsby	1959
Skylark 3f	Slingsby	1961
Dart 15	Slingsby	1964
Swallow	Slingsby	1967
Foka 4	SZD Poland	1963
YS 53	Yorkshire Sailplanes	1974
Zlín Z-24	Zlin	1946

Other gliders in private ownership are also made available to the collection from time to time.

== See also ==
- List of aerospace museums
