= Posnansky/Fronius PF-1 White Knight =

Swiss/American glider

PF-1 White Knight

General information
- Type: Glider
- National origin: Swiss/United States
- Designer: Hernan Posnansky and Robert L. Fronius
- Status: sole example still operational
- Number built: one

History
- Introduction date: 1963

The Posnansky/Fronius PF-1 White Knight is a Swiss/American FAI Standard Class high-wing, T-tailed, single-seat glider that was designed and constructed by Hernan Posnansky and later greatly redesigned by Posnansky and Robert L. Fronius.

== Design and development ==
The PF-1 was initially constructed by Posnansky in Switzerland in 1963, while he was a student at ETH Zurich there. The aircraft resembles the FFA Diamant, which was also under construction at the same time and place. Posnansky flew the aircraft for one year and then later moved to San Diego, California. The aircraft was inactive until 1983. Posnansky and Fronius greatly modified the PF-1 and re-licensed it as a US Experimental - Amateur-built, N15PF, in 1983.

The PF-1 is of mixed construction. The fuselage is a glass and foam sandwich, while the wings are from a Schleicher Ka 8 and thus have spruce spars covered in birch plywood and doped aircraft fabric covering. The wing employs a NACA 64-415 airfoil and has terminal velocity dive brakes on the top and bottom surfaces. The tow hook is mounted on the aircraft's center of gravity. The landing gear is a fixed and faired monowheel. The cockpit features a reclined pilot position and a side-stick.

Even though it uses the same wing as the Ka 8 the White Knight has a glide ratio that is seven points higher, due to the more streamlined fuselage.

Only one PF-1 was ever built.

== Operational history ==
As of June 2011 the PF-1 was still on the Federal Aviation Administration registry and co-owned by Posnansky and Fronius.

== Specifications (PF-1) ==
Data from Sailplane Directory and Soaring

General characteristics

- Crew: one
- Wingspan: 49 ft 3 in (15 m)
- Wing area: 153 sq ft (14.2 m^{2})
- Aspect ratio: 15.9:1
- Airfoil: NACA 64-415
- Empty weight: 431 lb (195 kg)
- Gross weight: 660 lb (299 kg)

Performance

- Maximum glide ratio: 34:1
- Rate of sink: 120 ft/min (0.61 m/s)

== See also ==
Aircraft of comparable role, configuration, and era

- FFA Diamant

Related lists

- List of gliders
