= Flug- und Fahrzeugwerke Altenrhein =

Swiss aircraft and railcar company

- Industry: Manufacturing
- Headquarters: Switzerland
- Products: Aircraft, railroad cars, trolleybus bodies

Flug- und Fahrzeugwerke Altenrhein AG (FFA) (English: Flight and Driving Vehicle Plant Altenrhein) was a Swiss aircraft and railroad car manufacturing company based at Altenrhein (SG). It was originally part of Dornier Flugzeugwerke, but was split off in 1948. It also made bodies for trolleybuses.

== History ==
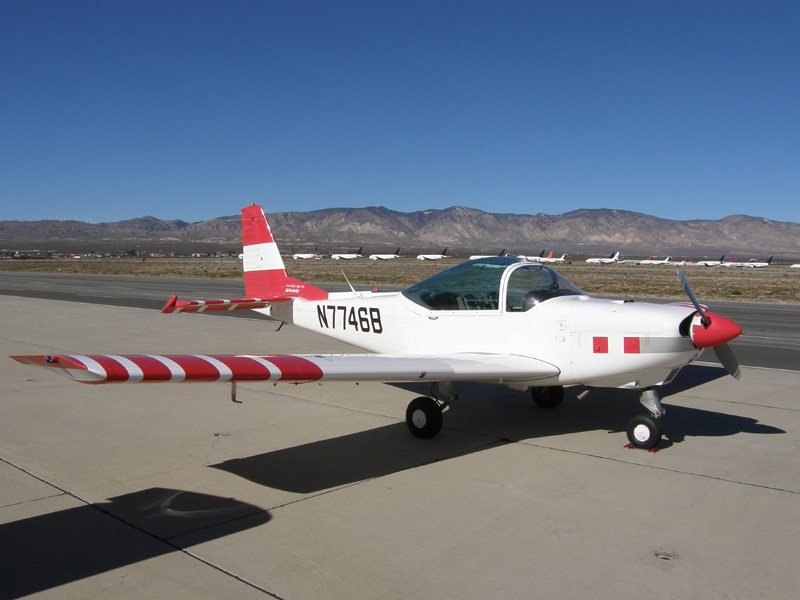
FFA AS 202 Bravo

In the years following World War II, FFA manufactured fighter aircraft for the Swiss Air Force, based on Morane-Saulnier designs as the D-3803. These were eventually replaced in service by surplus P-51 Mustangs.

In the 1950s, FFA developed a jet fighter, the P-16. The P-16 project, while promising, was cancelled after two crashes, and Hawker Hunters were bought instead. Also the project for a Bizjet SAAC-23 was cancelled. In the 1960s the company built the Diamant series of sailplanes.

The firm built many aircraft under licence for Swiss use, including the de Havilland Vampire, de Havilland Venom, Dassault Mirage III, and F-5 Tiger II.

In 1987, the company name was bought back by Dornier. The railway division first went to Schindler, ultimately becoming part of Stadler Rail in 1997.

== Aircraft ==
- FFA AS 202 Bravo
- FFA P-16
- FFA Diamant
