= Scott Viking 2 =

British two-seat glider, 1939

Viking 2

General information
- Type: High performance two seat sailplane
- National origin: UK
- Manufacturer: Scott Light Aircraft Ltd., Dunstable
- Designer: W.R. Scott
- Number built: 1

History
- First flight: 27 August 1939
- Developed from: Scott Viking 1

The Scott Viking 2 was the first British high performance two seat sailplane, flying a few days before the outbreak of World War II. Only one was built; it was used in radar station trials in the summer of 1940.

== Design and development ==
The all wood Viking 2 was a close relative of the earlier Viking 1 but bigger, heavier and with a modified and repositioned wing. The latter retained the same planform, having a constant chord central section and tapered outer panels with rounded tips. The outer panels, each about one third of the span, carried full width, variable droop ailerons. A pair of spoilers was fitted at mid-chord on the centre section. However, the wing was mid-mounted rather than shoulder mounted and had slight dihedral on the thickened central section. The upper surfaces of the outer panels were without dihedral, forming overall a cantilever gull wing. The wing span was 10 ft 0 in (3.06 m) greater than that of the Viking 1.

The fuselage of the Viking 2 was also similar to those of its predecessor, oval in section and plywood skinned, though wider to accommodate the side-by-side cockpit and also 27 in (686 mm) longer. The canopy line was lower and smoother than that of the Viking 1. The fuselage narrowed to the rear where the tapered tailplane was mounted just above the fuselage on a short sub-fin or pedestal. The chord of both pedestal and tailplane were greater than on the Viking 1, with more sweep on the tailplane's leading edge. There was no fixed fin; the tapered, rounded, fabric covered rudder extended to the lower fuselage and moved in a cut-out in the elevators. A single main skid reached from the nose to below cockpit, where there was a single, part exposed fixed wheel. There was a bumper on the extreme rear fuselage.

== Operational history ==
The prototype Viking 2 first flew on 27 August 1939, from Dunstable. This was only a few days before the UK declared war, when civilian glider flying was banned. Nonetheless, the Viking received its Certificate of Airworthiness in January 1940. In June 1940 it was impressed into service with the RAF Christchurch based Special Flight Unit for trials of the radar stations along the English south coast. It was later test flown from Farnborough but was lost after wing flutter developed; both pilots escaped safely by parachute.

== Specifications ==
Data from British Gliders and Sailplanes 1922-1970

General characteristics

- Crew: 2
- Length: 22 ft 1 in (6.73 m)
- Wingspan: 61 ft 0 in (18.59 m)
- Wing area: 235 sq ft (21.8 m^{2})
- Aspect ratio: 16.3
- Empty weight: 510 lb (231 kg)
- Gross weight: 910 lb (413 kg)

Performance

- Rate of sink: 144 ft/min (0.73 m/s) at 35 mph (56 km/h)
- Lift-to-drag: Maximum 24
