= EoN 460 =

British series of wooden sailplanes, 1960s

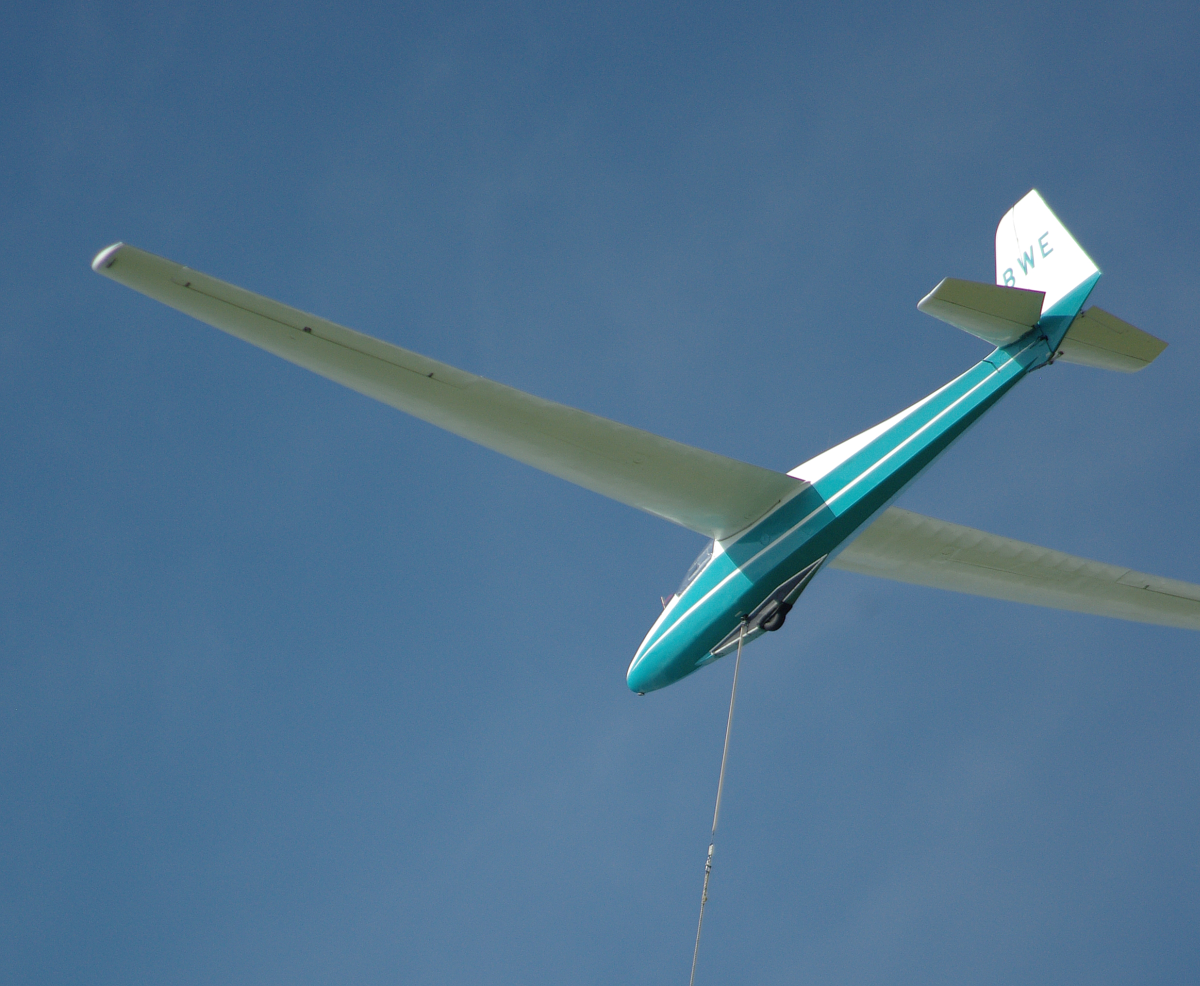

General information
- Type: Single-seat standard class sailplane
- National origin: United Kingdom
- Manufacturer: Elliotts of Newbury
- Number built: 55

History
- Manufactured: 1963-c.1966
- First flight: 26 April 1960

The EoN 460 series are wooden single-seat standard class sailplanes, built in the UK in the 1960s. It did not have major competition success but some remain in use in 2021.

== Design and development ==
It was built in 1961 as a completely new Standard Class glider. The name Eon 460, sometimes written as Eon Olympia 460, stands both for a series of gliders and for the prototypes of the series, all described by EoN as Type 10. Five slightly different model 460 prototypes were followed by 48 production model 463s. Two model 465s, with slimmer, slightly longer fuselages made possible by a semi-reclining pilot's position, were built for the 1965 World Gliding Championships. They were the last gliders designed and built by Elliotts of Newbury before their takeover by Slingsby Sailplanes in March 1966.

All the 460 series have wooden structures and are largely plywood skinned. They have straight-tapered cantilever shoulder wings with 5° of dihedral and fabric covering over the plywood skin. The prototypes and production 463s have fabric-covered Frise type ailerons; the type 465 has sealed, pendulum-type ailerons. All have plywood DFS type airbrakes extending above and below the wings; standard class gliders do not carry flaps. The straight-tapered tail surfaces are fabric covered. The rudder runs to the keel via a cut-out in the horizontal trailing edge. The tailplane is a cantilever structure, mounted on top of the fuselage, folding upwards for transport and carrying conventional split elevators with a starboard trim tab on the prototypes and production 463s. The 465s have non-folding all-moving tailplanes with tabs on both trailing edges.

The fuselage is a flat-sided Warren girder structure, plywood covered apart from the curved glass fibre rear decking. Wing attachment involves some aluminium fittings. The single seat cockpit is ahead of the wing leading edge under a single piece canopy. All 460 series aircraft use a fixed, unsprung monowheel main undercarriage. On the first four prototypes at least, this was mounted below the fuselage in a fairing which exposed only the edge of the wheel. On the 463s, the wheel is unfaired but assisted by an integral skid. The 465s have no skid and the wheel mounting is instead raised into the fuselage. All have a tail bumper with a "roller skate" tailwheel.

The Eon 460 first flew on 26 April 1960 then went to RAE Bedford for testing and, whilst there, took part in the RAF and Interforces Competition held at RAF Odiham in July that year. This machine, registered as G-APWL and designated 460 Type A had a wing with aspect ratio 20 and an all-up weight of 600 lb (272 kg), well in excess of its design weight. It was followed by the Type B with aspect ratio of 18 and an all-up weight of 630 lb (286 kg), the values adopted for production machines. Both these aircraft had performances limited by turbulence generated behind the canopy and at the wing roots. They were followed by the Type C which was like the Type A but had a longer, lower hood and upper decking. The final prototype variant was the Type D, like the Type C but with modified outer wing sections. The less competitive production machines, produced from April 1963, were as the Type D but with wings of aspect ratio 18. despite opposition from the designer, Harry Midwood, and the chief test pilot, David Ince.

== Operational history ==
Three EoN 460s, the first three prototypes with the Type A modified to Type C canopy style, competed without success in the 1961 National Championships, failing to finish in the top five places and outperformed by earlier EoN Olympia variants.

Both the EoN 465s competed in the 1965 World Gliding Championships held in the UK at South Cerney but performed poorly, placed 9th and 41st out of a field of 45 in the Standard Class. A 463 also competed, finishing 40th.

Most of the 460 series aircraft flew with clubs and private owners in the UK, including five used by Royal Air Force Gliding & Soaring Association branches. Some are still flying, including BGA1296 ("BWE"), which was at the Vintage Glider Club rally held at Tibenham in August 2010. Four 463s went to New Zealand, one 463 and the first 465 to South Africa and one 463 to Croatia.

== Aircraft on display ==
A 460 is under restoration at the Gliding Heritage Centre in Hampshire. The second 463 is on display in the Museum of Science and Industry in Manchester and the second 465 at the Museum of Berkshire Aviation.

== Variants ==
Data from Ellison

460
Type A: 1st prototype, A.U.W. 600 lbs (272 kg), aspect ratio 20, Frise ailerons, folding tailplane, faired mainwheel
Type B: 2nd and 5th prototypes, as Type A but with A.U.W. 630 lbs (286 kg), aspect ratio 18
Type C: 3rd prototype, as Type A but with longer, lower canopy
Type D: 4th prototype, as Type C but with altered outer wing sections

463
Production model, as Type D but with weight and aspect ratio of Type B, unfaired mainwheel with skid

465
Series 1: 1st aircraft for 1965 World Gliding Championship, lowered, longer (by 1.97 in or 50 mm) fuselage, pendulum sealed ailerons, all-moving, non-folding tailplane, raised mainwheel with no skid; A.U.W. 680 lb (308 kg). First flown 1 March 1965
Series 2: 2nd Championship aircraft, as Series 1 but with thinner wing section and strengthened spar; A.U.W. 700 lb (317 kg). First flown 2 April 1965

== Specifications (463) ==
Data from Jane's All the World's Aircraft 1966/7

General characteristics

- Crew: 1
- Length: 21 ft 0 in (6.40 m)
- Wingspan: 49 ft 3 in (15.00 m)
- Height: 5 ft 8 in (1.73 m) over tail
- Wing area: 132.0 sq ft (12.26 m^{2}) gross
- Aspect ratio: 18
- Airfoil: NACA 64_{3}618 root, 64_{4}421 at tip
- Empty weight: 400 lb (181 kg)
- Max takeoff weight: 630 lb (286 kg)

Performance

- Never exceed speed: 136 mph (219 km/h, 118 kn) in smooth air
- Maximum glide ratio: 32:1 at 48 mph (78 km/h)
- Rate of sink: 132 ft/min (0.67 m/s) best, at 42.5 mph (68.5 km/h)
