= Aktiengesellschaft für Flugzeugunternehmungen =

Aktiengesellschaft für Flugzeugunternehmungen (Corporation for Aircraft Companies) was an aircraft manufacturer founded in Altenrhein, Switzerland in 1959 to further develop the FFA P-16 jet fighter after the Swiss government cancelled its order. Three variants were proposed, each with a different turbojet, but the project was unable to attract buyers.
