= Microturbo TRS 18 =

Small, low thrust turbojet

TRS 18
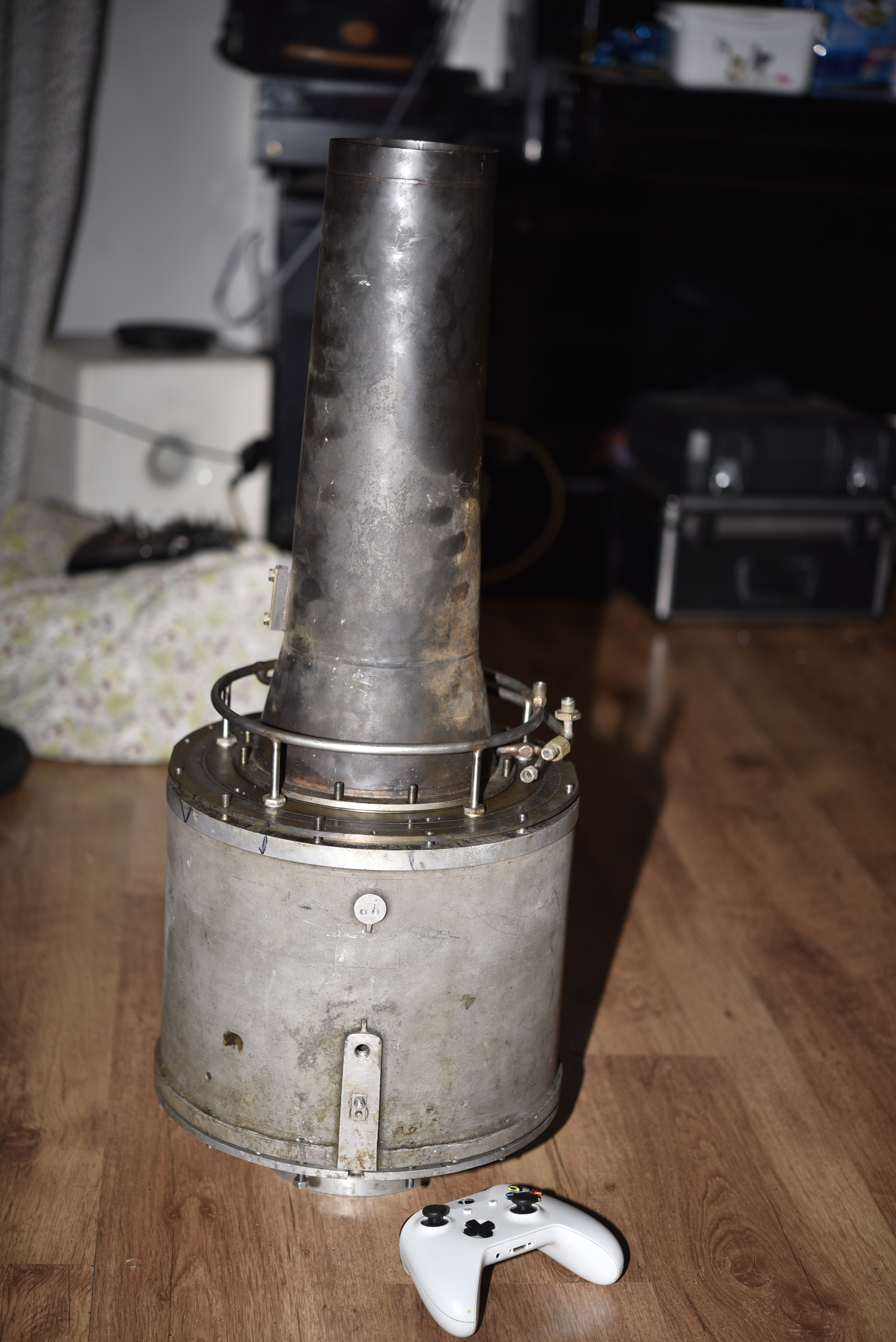
- A TRS 18 with Xbox controller for scale
- Type: Turbojet
- National origin: France
- Manufacturer: Microturbo SA

The Microturbo TRS 18 is a small, low thrust turbojet designed and built in France in the 1970s. It was installed on both manned and unmanned aircraft.

== Design and development ==
The TRS 18 was originally designed for self-launching motor gliders but was adapted to power conventional ultralight aircraft and unmanned vehicles (RPV). It was originally designed and developed by Sermel, a competitor company to Microturbo which the latter took over in 1971. It is a simple, low thrust, reverse flow single shaft engine with a centrifugal compressor and axial turbine. It is built in three modules: an intake section containing starter and lubrication systems; a centre section with compressor and turbine on ball bearings; and an aft section with the folded combustion chambers and tail-pipe.

It gained its US Federal Aviation Administration type certificate in May 1976.

== Variants ==
Data from Jane's All the World's Aircraft 1984-85

TRS 18-046
Production version, primarily intended for manned applications with full self start provision, oil lubrication and temperature and pressure transducers.
TRS 18-056
Cut down gas generator or core engine version, fuel lubricated and only 62% the weight of the 18-046 version but the same thrust; intended for RPVs.
TRS 18-075
Intended respectively for the Flight Refuelling ASAT target drone. Includes an engine driven alternator and fuel and oil lubrication pumps. Dry weight as 18-046. Take-off thrust increased to 1.15 kN (260 lb st) and maximum continuous thrust to 1.10 kN (247 lb st).
TRS 18-076
Intended for the Meteor-Mirach 100. Includes an engine driven alternator and fuel and oil lubrication pumps. Dry weight as 18-046. Take-off thrust increased to 1.15 kN (260 lb st) and maximum continuous thrust to 1.10 kN (247 lb st).

== Applications ==
Data from Jane's All the World's Aircraft 1984-85

Manned

- Bede BD-5J
- Caproni Vizzola A-21SJ
- Chagnes Microstar (version of Rutan VariViggen)
- EFF Prometheus 19
- EFF Prometheus 12
- Microjet 200
- NASA AD-1 slew wing

Unmanned

- Flight Refuelling ASAT
- France-engins Mitsoubac
- Meteor-Mirach 100

== Specifications (TRS 18-046) ==
Data from Jane's All the World's Aircraft 1984-85

==== General characteristics ====
- Type: Single shaft centrifugal turbojet.
- Length: 650 mm (25.59 in)
- Diameter: 325 mm (12.80 in) wide × 350 mm (13.78 in) high.
- Dry weight: 37 kg (81.6 lb) dry, basic, no jet pipe.

==== Components ====
- Compressor: Centrifugal; one piece with diffuser and straightener vanes.
- Combustors: Folded, with ten spill type burners.
- Turbine: Axial.
- Fuel type: Electric pump.
- Oil system: Submerged pump in tank on front underside; filter and pressure transducer on upper side. Closed circuit with high pressure supply to rotor and gearbox bearings.

==== Performance ====
- Maximum thrust: Take-off 1.10 kN (247 lb st). Maximum continuous 1.00 kN (225 lb st).
- Specific fuel consumption: 35 g/(kN⋅s) (1.24 lb/h⋅lb st).
- Thrust-to-weight ratio: 3.0
