= DFS Olympia Meise =

German single-seat glider, 1938

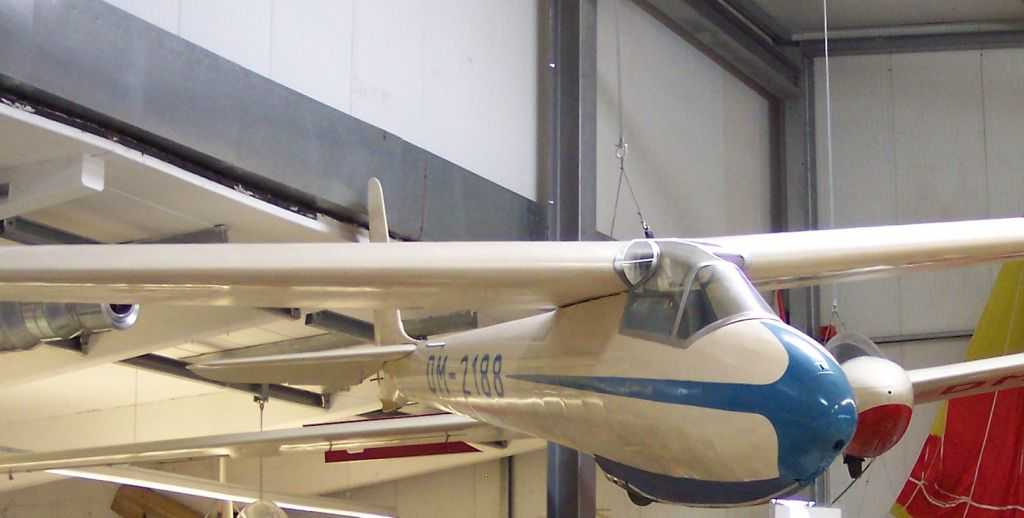
- DFS Olympia Meise

General information
- Type: Sailplane
- Manufacturer: DFS
- Designer: Hans Jacobs
- Number built: >952

History
- Variants: Zlin Z-25 Šohaj, EoN Olympia

The DFS Olympia Meise (German: "Olympic Titmouse") was a German sailplane designed by the Deutsche Forschungsanstalt für Segelflug (DFS) for Olympic competition, based on the DFS Meise.

== Design and development ==
After the Olympic games in Berlin in 1936 introduced gliding as an Olympic sport, plans were made to fly the 1940 Olympic championships with a standard design of sailplane to give each pilot the same chances. The Meise was redesigned to fit into the new Olympic class specifications. The new 'Olympia' Meise had the prescribed wingspan of 15 m (49 ft 2 in), spoilers, but no flaps, and an undercarriage consisting of a skid and a non-retractable wheel. The pilot sat all-enclosed in an aerodynamically clean fuselage made of laminated wood and topped by an acrylic glass hood. The plane could be launched by winch as well by towplane. Its wood-and-fabric construction made it easy for flying clubs to maintain, to repair and even to build the gliders from kits.

A design contest to select the single Olympic glider was run by testing the prototypes of the entered and accepted designs at Sezze airfield in Italy between 20 and 26 February 1939. There were six evaluation pilots of different nationalities. They chose Hans Jacobs’ design, the DFS Meise.

Both the Meise as well as the Olympic class gained immediate enthusiastic support, and the 1940 Olympic gliding championship would probably have ended up as an all-Meise contest — if the Second World War had not intervened and the 1940 Olympics had not been cancelled. Nevertheless, 626 Olympia Meises were built in Germany during the war by Flugzeugbau Ferdinand Schmetz Herzogenrath (601 built) and Flugzeugbau Schleicher (25). Most of the German production were among the 15,000 German gliders destroyed in 1945. 17 were also built at the time in Sweden.

The design of the Olympia Meise survived the war and was taken up by a small British firm called Chilton Aircraft Ltd. The German drawings were not detailed and so entirely new drawings were made that retained the Olympia Meise's aerodynamic shape but otherwise it was a stronger and heavier aircraft. After building one prototype, which flew in 1946, the rights and drawings of the Chilton aircraft were taken up by another British company, Elliotts of Newbury (EoN). Their first EoN Olympia flew in 1947. Later variants by Elliotts continued to be produced as gliders suitable for the World Gliding Championships into the late 1950s. The Olympia was also built after the war in Germany, where series production restarted in 1956, in France as the Nord 2000 (100 built), in the Netherlands, Switzerland (12), Hungary (35) with a further twenty modified as the Cinke, Australia (3), Austria, in Czechoslovakia as the Zlin Z-25 Šohaj, Brazil (7).

== Variants ==
DFS Olympia Meise
The original design for the 1940 Olympic gliding competition; built in large numbers during and after World War II, in Germany, Sweden, the Netherlands, Switzerland, Hungary, Austria and Brazil.
Chilton Olympia 2
A single prototype built in England by Chilton Aircraft in 1946.
Elliotts of Newbury EoN Olympia
Further production in the UK after Elliotts acquired the rights to the design from Chilton.

EoN Type 5 Olympia 1: Improved Olympia-Meise. Landing skid.
EoN Type 5 Olympia 2: Fixed monowheel.
EoN Type 5 Olympia 3: Jettisonable dolly wheels and skid.
EoN Type 5 Olympia 4: New wing section, NACA 64_{3}618 at root, NACA 64_{3}421 at tip.

Nord 2000
Production in France post-war.
Zlin Z-25 Šohaj
Production in Czechoslovakia post-war.
Cinke
A modified version built in Hungary post-war.

== Aircraft on display ==
- US Southwest Soaring Museum
- National Soaring Museum
- Deutsches Technikmuseum Berlin

== Specifications (Olympia Meise 51) ==
Data from The World's Sailplanes:Die Segelflugzeuge der Welt:Les Planeurs du Monde

General characteristics

- Crew: 1
- Length: 7.3 m (23 ft 11 in)
- Wingspan: 15 m (49 ft 3 in)
- Width: 0.58 m (1 ft 11 in) maximum fuselage width
- Wing area: 15 m^{2} (160 sq ft)
- Aspect ratio: 15
- Empty weight: 165 kg (364 lb) equipped
- Max takeoff weight: 290 kg (639 lb)

Performance

- Never exceed speed: 220 km/h (140 mph, 120 kn)
- Aerotow speed: 100 km/h (62 mph; 54 kn)
- Winch launch speed: 80 km/h (50 mph; 43 kn)
- Maximum glide ratio: 25 at 70 km/h (43 mph; 38 kn)
- Rate of sink: 0.67 m/s (132 ft/min) at 60 km/h (37 mph; 32 kn)
- Wing loading: 17 kg/m^{2} (3.5 lb/sq ft)

== See also ==
Related development

- DFS Meise
- EoN Olympia
- Nord 1300
- Zlin 25 Sohaj

Aircraft of comparable role, configuration, and era

- Slingsby T.26 Kite 2

Related lists

- List of gliders
