= Scott Viking 1 =

British single-seat glider, 1938

Viking 1
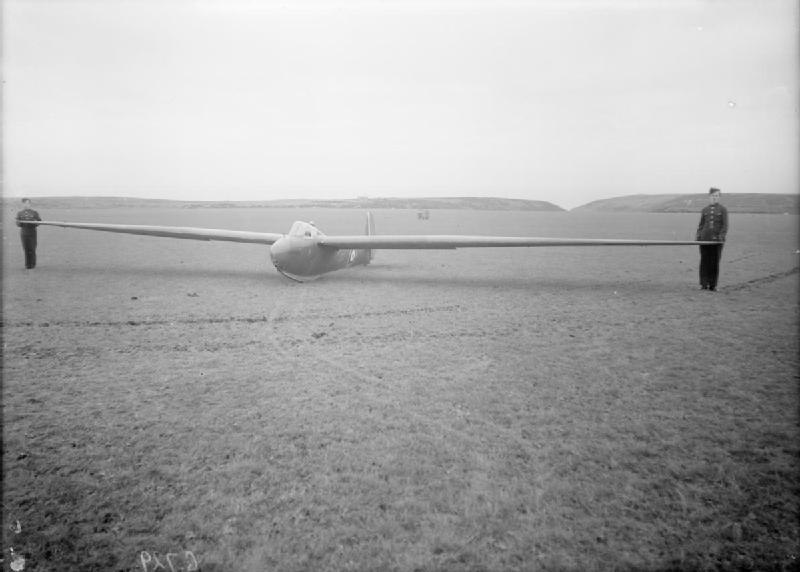

General information
- Type: High performance sailplane
- National origin: United Kingdom
- Manufacturer: Scott Light Aircraft Ltd, Dunstable
- Designer: W. R. Scott
- Number built: 4

History
- First flight: 6 November 1938
- Variant: Scott Viking 2

The Scott Viking 1 was a single seat, high-performance glider designed and built in the UK just before the Second World War. Only four were constructed, one setting records in Argentina and another remaining active into the 1980s.

== Design and development ==
The Viking 1 was an all-wood aircraft, with a single spar cantilever shoulder wing which was fabric covered behind the spar. In plan, the wing had constant chord in the central section and tapered outer panels with rounded tips. The outer panels, each about one third of the span, carried full width, variable droop ailerons. A pair of hinged plate spoilers was fitted at mid-chord on the centre section. The wing had slight dihedral.

The fuselage was oval in section and plywood skinned. The single seat cockpit was just ahead of the wings and had a multi-part, detachable, transparent canopy with a rather abrupt forward profile and a brief fairing aft. The fuselage narrowed to the rear where the tapered tailplane was mounted just above the fuselage on a short sub-fin or pedestal. There was no fixed fin; the tapered, rounded, fabric covered rudder extended to the lower fuselage and moved in a cut-out in the elevators. A single main skid reached from the nose to below the trailing edge of the wing, with a bumper style tail skid on the extreme rear fuselage.

A larger span derivative, the Scott Viking 2, was the first British high performance two seat sailplane.

== Operational history ==
The prototype Viking 1 first flew, from Dunstable Downs, on 6 November 1938. Three more were completed. The prototype was taken to Buenos Aires by R. P. Cooper, who flew, then sold, it there. By 1944 it was being flown in Argentina by Roberto Madson, setting new records. A Viking 1 took part, though without distinction, in the last pre-war UK National Soaring Competition, held at the Derbyshire and Lancashire Gliding Club's site at Camphill, Great Hucklow in mid-July 1939.

At least two of the three UK-based Vikings, all of which had appeared on the British Gliding Association register, were impressed into war service. From August 1940 BGA425 served at RAF Ringway with the Glider Flight, renamed the Glider Training Squadron on 22 August 1940 and transferred to a new base at RAF Thame on 28 December 1940. Its initial role at Ringway was to develop glider instrumentation for military use.

Another example of the type was with the Air Training Corps; they may have been engaged in radar calibration experiments; both were taken out of use by 1942. The third Viking, registered BGA 416, remained active with the Leicestershire Gliding Club at Husbands Bosworth until at least 1984. It was moved to the Gliding Heritage Centre at Lasham Airfield in August 2015.

== Specifications ==
Data from British Gliders and Sailplanes 1922-1970

General characteristics

- Crew: 1
- Length: 19 ft 10 in (6.05 m)
- Wingspan: 51 ft 0 in (15.54 m)
- Wing area: 171 sq ft (15.9 m^{2})
- Aspect ratio: 15.4
- Airfoil: Göttingen 535 at root, symmetric at tip
- Empty weight: 370 lb (168 kg)
- Gross weight: 540 lb (245 kg)

Performance

- Rate of sink: 150 ft/min (0.76 m/s) minimum, at 33 mph (53 km/h)
- Lift-to-drag: Maximum 20
- Wing loading: 3.15 lb/sq ft (15.4 kg/m^{2})
