= Chilton Aircraft =

British aircraft design and manufacturing company

- Company type: aircraft design and manufacture
- Founded: Early 1937
- Defunct: 1946
- Fate: Ceased operations in 1946
- Headquarters: Leverton, near Hungerford, Berkshire
- Key people: Hon. Andrew Dalrymple and A.R. Ward

Chilton Aircraft Ltd was a British aircraft design and manufacturing company of the late 1930s and 1940s.

== Foundation ==
The company was founded in early 1937 by two former de Havilland Technical School students and Old Etonians, the Hon. Andrew Dalrymple (born 1914), the son of Sir John Dalrymple, and Alexander Reginald Ward (born 1915), the son of Hon. Sir John Ward, whose father was the 1st Earl of Dudley. It established a small factory on the Chilton Lodge estate at Leverton, near Hungerford in Berkshire, from which location the firm's name was derived.

== The Chilton D.W.1 ==
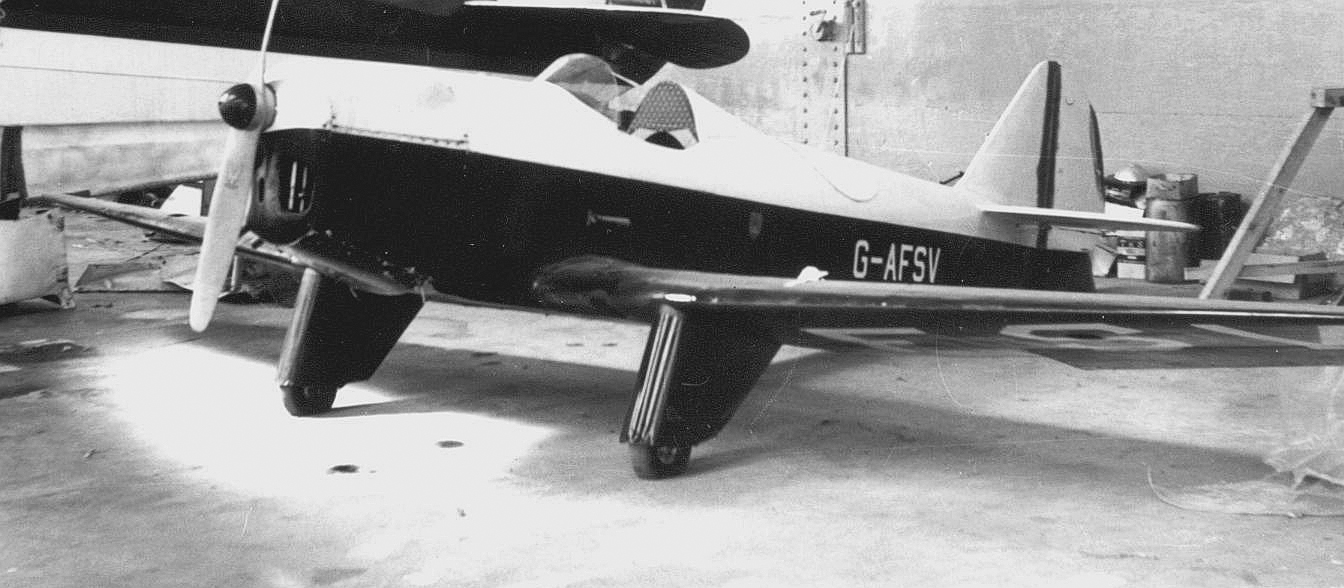
The Chilton D.W.1A at Netheravon Airfield, Wiltshire, in April 1968

The founders designed a small, low-powered, but fast, sporting monoplane, designated the Chilton D.W.1. The aircraft had a clean aerodynamic design, which required split flaps to lower the landing speed. The Carden Ford 32 h.p. engine gave it a declared top speed of 112 mph, but during racing, 129 mph was eventually reached.

Four aircraft were built between early 1937 and July 1939, the last having a 45 h.p. Train 4T engine, being designated the D.W.1A. A further development, the Chilton D.W.2, was commenced, but had not been completed at the outbreak of World War II. The four aircraft were stored during the war and the jigs, spares and half-completed D.W.2 were taken over by the College of Aeronautical Engineering at Redhill Aerodrome.

All four D.W.1s flew post-war, taking part in many air races, but after accidents, only two survived in airworthy condition in 2005. From the mid-1980s, three examples have been commenced by amateur builders, one of which first flew in 1987. These aircraft are powered by a Lycoming O-145 engine.

== Gliders ==
The firm had been planning to make a small glider called the Chilton Cavalier, after the war. However, a glider pilot, Dudley Hiscox, brought the drawings of a better glider, the DFS Olympia Meise, to Chilton and so a prototype was built in a converted chicken house on the Chilton estate. The German drawings were not detailed and so new drawings were made in which the Meise was altered for cheaper production. Aircraft consultants, called 'A and EP', checked the stresses for British airworthiness conditions and consequently the spar and joint fittings were strengthened. The maiden flight was made on 11 August 1946. At that time the firm had a long order list for Chilton Olympians.

The building of the wings for the prototype had been sub-contracted to Elliotts of Newbury. On completion of the prototype's wings, Elliotts refused to sell the wing jigs to Chilton. Andrew Dalrymple was killed in a crash of a Fi Storch on 25 December 1945 near Hungerford, and this event soon ended aircraft production. After the death of Dalrymple an agreement was reached to sell production rights and all the work in hand on the redesigned Olympia to Elliotts, who went on to build 150 EoN Olympia. The Chilton prototype was eventually declared un-airworthy in 1970 and destroyed.

== In Australia ==
Plans for the Chilton Olympia were imported into Australia. Three were constructed, and two were still flying in 2015.

VH-GDQ "Columbus": written off.

VH-GFW "Yellow Witch": homebuilt by Arthur Douglas Hardinge, Bendigo, owned by K. Nolan, Melbourne.

VH-GLY: built 1959, refurbished by Mike Valentine.

== Aircraft ==
- Chilton D.W.1 light monoplane
- Chilton Cavalier glider (not built)
- Chilton Olympia glider – became the EoN Olympia
