= Elliotts of Newbury Eon =

Newbury EoN
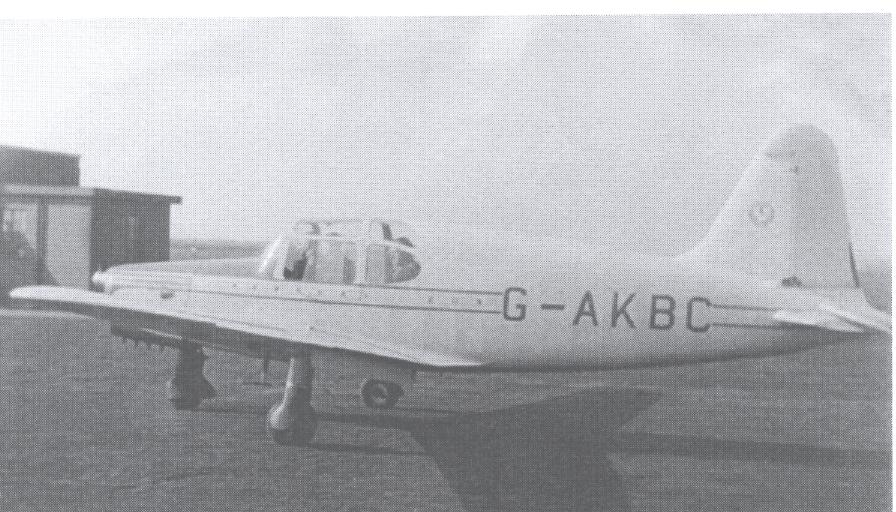
- Newbury Eon G-AKBC demonstrating at Barton Aerodrome Manchester in 1948

General information
- Type: Touring monoplane
- Manufacturer: Elliotts of Newbury
- Designer: Aviation and Engineering Products, Ltd
- Number built: 1

History
- First flight: 8 August 1947
- Retired: 1950

The Elliotts of Newbury EoN or Elliotts EoN A.P.4 was a 1940s British four-seat touring monoplane aircraft built by Elliotts of Newbury.

== Development ==
Elliotts of Newbury were experienced wartime glider manufacturers but at the end of World War II decided to venture into the design and production of powered aircraft. The result was the EoN A.P.4 (more commonly called the Newbury Eon, a wooden four-seat monoplane with a fixed tricycle landing gear. The design was carried out by Aviation and Engineering Products Ltd of Feltham, Middlesex. The prototype Eon 1 registered G-AKBC powered by a 100 hp (75 kW) Blackburn Cirrus Minor engine first flew at Welford, Berkshire, on 8 August 1947. The aircraft, which had been designed for a more powerful engine, proved to be underpowered with the Cirrus Minor and unable to carry four people. It received a Certificate of Airworthiness in September 1947. After initial testing was completed, the prototype was modified to reflect the planned production version. The main changes were a new engine, a de Havilland Gipsy Major of 145 hp (108 kW), and a lengthened nose-wheel leg. The modified aircraft was redesignated the Eon 2.

With a surplus of ex-military trainers and liaison aircraft flooding the post-war British civil aircraft market, and a shortage of modern engines, the company decided not to enter production, with the part-built second prototype remaining incomplete. Elliots continued as a glider manufacturer. The sole completed Eon aircraft was used as a glider-tug to demonstrate the company's gliders. The aircraft met its end at Lympne airfield, Kent, on 14 April 1950, when, with a glider attached the pilot started the aircraft by swinging the propeller with the aircraft's wheels not secured by chocks. The engine started, and the craft moved forward; the pilotless aircraft and the glider were damaged as the aircraft passed through a boundary hedge. The glider pilot had also abandoned his cockpit when he realised what was happening.

== Variants ==
Eon 1
Prototype with a 100 hp (75 kW) Blackburn Cirrus Minor piston engine.
Eon 2
Prototype re-engined with a 145 hp (108kW) de Havilland Gipsy Major engine.

== Specifications (Eon 2) ==
Data from For Business and Pleasure

General characteristics

- Crew: 1
- Capacity: 3 passengers
- Length: 25 ft 6 in (7.77 m)
- Wingspan: 37 ft 0 in (11.28 m)
- Height: 9 ft 9 in (2.97 m)
- Wing area: 173 sq ft (16.1 m^{2})
- Aspect ratio: 8:1
- Airfoil: NACA 2R.12
- Empty weight: 1,714 lb (777 kg)
- Max takeoff weight: 2,350 lb (1,066 kg)
- Fuel capacity: 18 imp gal (22 US gal; 82 L)
- Powerplant: 1 × de Havilland Gipsy Major 10 four-cylinder inverted air-cooled piston engine, 145 hp (108 kW)
- Propellers: 2-bladed fixed-pitch propeller, 6 ft 0 in (1.83 m) diameter

Performance

- Maximum speed: 136 mph (219 km/h, 118 kn)
- Cruise speed: 116 mph (187 km/h, 101 kn)
- Stall speed: 50 mph (80 km/h, 43 kn) (flaps down)
- Range: 350 mi (560 km, 300 nmi)
- Service ceiling: 13,400 ft (4,100 m)
- Rate of climb: 675 ft/min (3.43 m/s)
- Take-off run to 50 ft (15 m): 1,635 ft (498 m)
- Landing run from 50 ft (15 m): 1,500 ft (460 m)
