= FFA P-16 =

Swiss ground attack aircraft, 1955

P-16
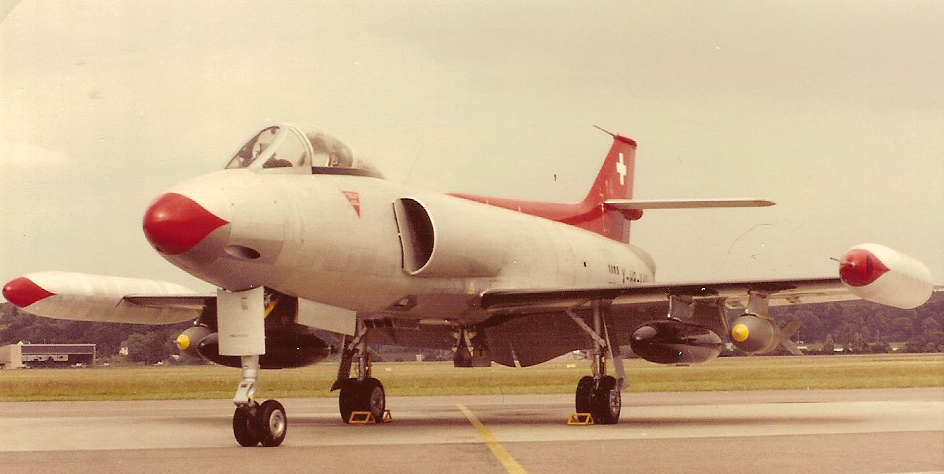

General information
- Type: Fighter
- National origin: Switzerland
- Manufacturer: Flug- und Fahrzeugwerke Altenrhein (FFA)
- Status: Cancelled
- Number built: 5

History
- First flight: 25 April 1955

The FFA P-16 is a Swiss prototype ground attack jet fighter designed and produced by aircraft manufacturer Flug- und Fahrzeugwerke Altenrhein (FFA). It was Switzerland's second attempt to develop a domestically designed and manufactured jet fighter, following the EFW N-20.

Work on what would become the P-16 commenced during the late 1940s. From the onset, the company intended for the indigenously developed fighter to replace several piston-engined aircraft that were then in service with the Swiss Air Force. During 1952, a pair of prototypes were ordered from FFA. On 25 April 1955, the first prototype performed its maiden flight. On August 15 1956, the second prototype exceeded the sound barrier for the first time. The flight test programme demonstrated the P-16 to be capable of achieving favourable performance; accordingly, a production contract for 100 aircraft was issued by the Swiss Government.

In the aftermath of a pre-production aircraft's crash, the Swiss production order was terminated and soon thereafter replaced by orders for the British-built Hawker Hunter. This cancellation had come before any production P-16s had been completed. While the company continued the program independently for a time, completing a further two aircraft, no buyers could be found for the type. The P-16s were examined by Bill Lear, who later developed the highly successful Learjet family of business jets. However, the P-16 was never introduced into service by any operator, and only a single example of the type remains presently.

== Development ==
=== Background ===
Following the end of the European portion of the Second World War, Switzerland was one of several nations who used the new-found peacetime to modernise and expand its industrial and military capabilities. At the time of the war's conclusion, the Swiss Air Force was equipped with numerous piston-engined aircraft, while several high-ranking officials sought to adopt new designs that harnessed newly developed jet propulsion instead. During the same time period, Swiss defense companies also sought to develop increasingly capable equipment, including Eidgenössische Flugzeugwerke Emmen's EFW N-20, which would be Switzerland's first domestically designed and manufactured jet fighter. According to author Fiona Lombardi, development of the N-20 was greatly hindered by a lack of technical knowledge and over-ambitious performance demands, which contributed to a protracted development programme. This effort would never progress beyond the prototype stage before being eclipsed by more capable aircraft and ultimately terminated.

During 1947, independent of the N-20 effort, Swiss firm Flug- und Fahrzeugwerke Altenrhein (FFA) decided to embark on their own independent fighter jet development programme. Designated P-16, it was reportedly conceived as being a supersonic-capable fighter-bomber that would be capable of deployment from the more remote and compact alpine bases. According to periodical Popular Mechanics, this ability to operate from short runways was particularly ambitious, as such a requirement had proved to be a substantial and persistence hindrance in efforts to procure suitable jet fighters for the Swiss Air Force. By the end of 1950, the Swiss Air Force had procured numerous subsonic jet aircraft from foreign sources, including the British de Havilland Vampire and de Havilland Venom fighters; however, the service still had a vacant role for a supersonic-capable fighter.

=== Flight testing and evaluation ===
During 1952, a pair of prototypes were ordered from FFA. On 25 April 1955, the first of these aircraft (J-3001) performed its maiden flight. This prototype was subsequently destroyed in a crash on 31 August 1955, having conducted 22 flights with a cumulative flight time of 12 hours 38 minutes. On 15 August 1956, the second prototype exceeded the sound barrier for the first time. This prototype completed another 310 flights by March 1958, being withdrawn shortly thereafter. A development contract for a batch of four pre-production aircraft was awarded. These aircraft, which were designated Mk II, differed from the earlier prototypes in a variety of ways; perhaps most significantly, these aircraft were furnished with the more powerful Armstrong Siddeley Sapphire 7 engine in place of the prototype's Sapphire 6.

Reportedly, test flights of the pre-production aircraft proved itself to have promise; during 1958, a production contract was awarded for 100 aircraft. However, another accident occurred when the first pre-production machine (J-3003) was destroyed in a crash on 25 March 1958 after 102 flights. According to Lombardi, the second crash was a major blow to the project; it has been claimed that the Swiss Government decided to cancel the entire order due to the accidents involved. By the end of the 1950s, Switzerland opted to procure British-built Hawker Hunters to meet the Swiss Air Force's needs instead of the P-16.

=== Post-termination development ===
Following the cancellation, FFA decided to continue the P-16 program at its own expense for a while. The company completing two further aircraft, which conformed to the more capable MK III standard; these (X-HB-VAC/J-3004 and X-HB-VAD/J-3005) conducted their first flights in July 1959 and March 1960 respectively, while their last flights were performed during April 1960 and June 1960. One of the last flights was the one and only presentation abroad at Friedrichshafen on the 26th of June 1960. Despite attempts by the company to attract customers, no buyers ultimately emerged for the type.

Certain design aspects of the P-16 were used by business man and inventor Bill Lear when developing the first of the highly successful Learjet family of business jets, the Learjet 23. Several of the engineers behind the P-16 later worked for Lear, and the design of both the P-16 and Learjet 23 bore several similarities; some historians have alleged the latter was a direct derivative of the former. According to Bill Lear's son, William P. Lear, the designs of the P-16 and the Learjet possessed substantial differences, particularly in terms of their wing and tail configurations, dismissing claims of there being close similarities between the two as "stories" and "fantasy". William had become involved in the P-16 program at a later stage, which included flying the type multiple times, after FFA had reached out to him for his assessment of the aircraft during 1960.

== Design ==
The FFA P-16 was a single-seat, single-engine aircraft, designed to be especially well suited to the close air support (CAS) role, but to also perform as a capable interceptor aircraft as well. In terms of its basic configuration, it was furnished with a low-mounted wing, air intakes on the fuselage sides, and the horizontal stabilizer mounted halfway up the fin. The exterior skin was composed of a relatively light-gauge alloy; in key areas, a specialised sandwich-type design was used to preserve stiffness, such as the wings. To facilitate effective operations when deploying upon unprepared fields, a relatively heavy undercarriage, complete with dual-wheels and tyres, was adopted; furthermore, it was designed with surplus strength to accommodate the potential needs of future variants of the P-16.

The P-16 could provide a high level of short-field performance, a factor which had been emphasized during its design. To accomplish this, the wing was equipped with various high-lift devices; these included somewhat uncommon full-span Krueger flaps on the leading edge, large Fowler-type flaps on the inboard-trailing edge, and Flaperons; ailerons which also operated as flaps. In conjunction, these devices reportedly allowed the aircraft to take off and land within 1,000 ft (330 m) at high altitude, allowing the P-16 to operate from the Alpine valleys characteristic of Switzerland. The wing itself was straight and relatively thin, achieved a low-aspect ratio; it featured multi-spar construction. It is provisioned with tip-tanks which, in addition to storing fuel, provide a structural function, acting as end plates. A fuselage break aft of the wings enabled the rapid changing of the engine.

The majority of powered systems, such as the flight controls, primarily harnessed Hydraulic power in the form of a Dowty-built high-pressure system; this was driven by the aircraft's turbojet engine and supplemented by accumulators for emergency operation of the undercarriage, air brakes and flaps. A second backup system is provided via a pneumatic system, powering the wheel brakes as well as undercarriage deployment and jettisoning the canopy. Bleed air drawn from the engine provided cockpit pressurization and air conditioning for pilot comfort. The electrical system incorporated a 24 V DC generator, electricity was used for various systems, including the engine starter, fuel pumps, windscreen heating, ultra high frequency (UHF) radio and radar set. Armaments were stored underneath the wings and within a weapons bay housed in the fuselage centre-section; the latter could accommodate rockets, fragmentation or napalm bombs, or a large fuel tank for additional endurance; furthermore, a pair of 30 mm cannon were permanently mounted in the nose.

== Variants ==
- Mk I: two prototypes powered with an Armstrong Siddeley Sapphire ASSa 6 engine of 7,900 lb (3983 kg) thrust.
- Mk II: pre-production machine with a Sapphire ASSa 7 engine of 11,000 lb (4,990 kg) thrust. Only one aircraft was completed out of an order for four before the project was cancelled.
- Mk III: two prototypes built as a private venture after the project's cancellation. Largely similar to Mk II, but with integration of the AIM-9B Sidewinder missile.

=== Proposed variants to be built by AFU ===
Aktiengesellschaft für Flugzeugunternehmungen proposed several variants:

- P-16-Trainer: Training version with two seats in tandem for the Swiss Air Force. Without the two 30mm guns of the single seater version.
- AR-7: Rolls-Royce RB.168 engine

== Surviving aircraft ==
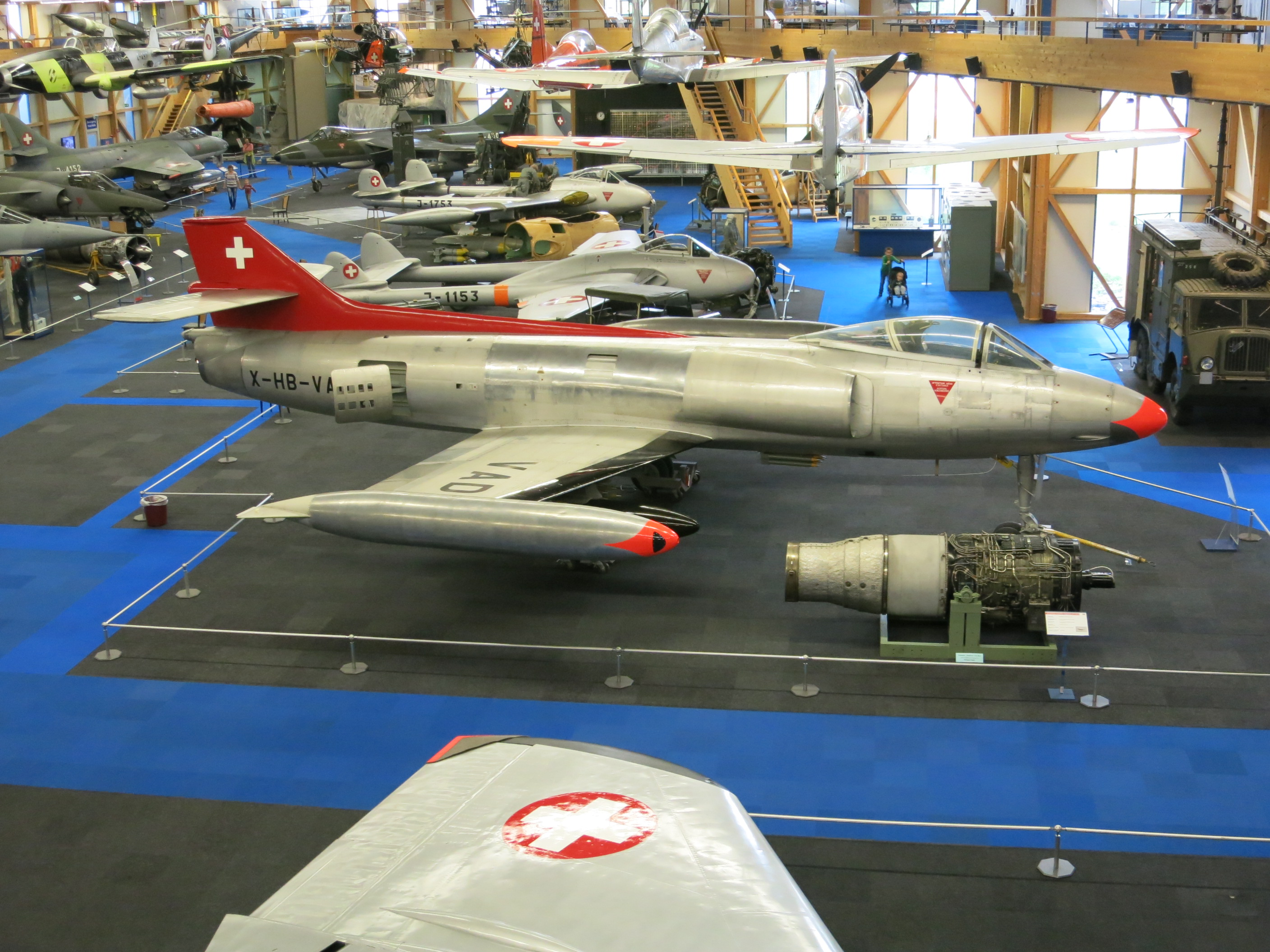
"X-HB-VAD" at the Flieger Flab Museum in 2016

As of 2007, only a single example of the P-16, which was assembled from elements of two separate prototypes, remains in existence. It is on display at the Swiss Air Force Museum at the Dübendorf Air Base.

== Specifications (Mark III) ==
Data from Switzerland's P-16: Father of the Learjet

General characteristics

- Crew: 1
- Length: 14.33 m (47 ft 0 in)
- Wingspan: 11.15 m (36 ft 7 in)
- Height: 4.27 m (14 ft 0 in)
- Wing area: 30 m^{2} (320 sq ft)
- Airfoil: NACA 64A109
- Empty weight: 7,037 kg (15,514 lb)
- Powerplant: 1 × Armstrong Siddeley ASSa.7 Sapphire turbojet engine, 49.1 kN (11,000 lbf) thrust

Performance

- Maximum speed: 1,118 km/h (695 mph, 604 kn) at sea level, clean
- Stall speed: 179 km/h (111 mph, 97 kn)
- Range: 1,447 km (899 mi, 781 nmi) at 9,150 m (30,020 ft)
- Service ceiling: 14,000 m (46,000 ft)
- Rate of climb: 65 m/s (12,800 ft/min)

Armament

- Guns: 2 × 30 mm Hispano-Suiza HS.825 cannon in nose with 120 rounds per gun, or Oerlikon KCA
- Hardpoints: 4 with a capacity of up to 2,590 kg (5,700 lb) of external stores
- Rockets: 44 × 68 mm SNEB rocket in retractable Matra launcher under fuselage
