= PGE EV.1K Fecske =

E.V.1K Fecske

General information
- Type: High performance single-seat Standard Class glider
- National origin: Hungary
- Manufacturer: Esztergom Facility of Pest County Machine Works (PGE)
- Number built: 1

History
- First flight: 18 September 1969

The PGE EV.1K Fecske (Swallow) was a high performance Hungarian sailplane designed and flown in the late 1960s. The sole example was destroyed in a fatal crash in 1970.

== Development ==
In 1964 a group of young engineers from the Pest County Machine Works began work on a glider designed to out-perform all previous Hungarian sailplanes. In 1965 the Works put out a call for designs; the engineers submitted theirs which was judged runner-up and good enough to build. A team of seven began the detailed design in 1967 and the EV.1.K Fecske first flew on 18 September 1969.

After completing a flight-test programme and obtaining certification for all aerobatic manoeuvres apart from outside loops, the Fecske was handed over to the Hungarian Glider Team for operational tests. In October 1970 serious pilot error led to the loss of both wings and a fatal crash. No more Fecskes were built.

== Design ==
The Fecske was an all-metal aircraft. Its shoulder-mounted, two-part wing was tetrahedral in plan, with an unswept leading edge. Its core monocoque structure was unusual, essentially a box spar occupying about 45% of the chord with its upper and lower surfaces, stiffened with span-wise z-section longerons, defining part of the laminar flow aerofoil. The pre-formed dural sheet leading edge was supported by ribs and the rear wing was also dural-skinned, internally stiffened with polyurethane foam. Narrow chord, split, plain ailerons filled about 45% of the outer trailing edge and split airbrakes the inner 45%.

The dural-skinned, elliptical-section fuselage was built around a conventional combination of frames connected behind the cockpit by eight z-section longerons. The forward fuselage was similar apart from three absent upper longerons. The pilot was placed ahead of the wing, under a long, two-part canopy which carefully followed the shape of the fuselage. A fixed monowheel at the centre of gravity was assisted by a flush skid under the nose and a small tailskid.

The Fecske had a T-tail with its tetrahedral plan, high aspect ratio tailplane and long, narrow, rectangular elevators mounted on top of a strongly swept fin. Its broad, angular rudder was also strongly swept.

== Specifications ==
General characteristics

- Crew: One
- Length: 6.86 m (22 ft 6 in)
- Wingspan: 15 m (49 ft 3 in)
- Wing area: 11.92 m^{2} (128.3 sq ft)
- Aspect ratio: 18.87
- Airfoil: Wortmann FX 61-163 out to FX 60-126 tips
- Empty weight: 220 kg (485 lb)
- Gross weight: 350 kg (772 lb)
- Dihedral: 0°

Performance

- Maximum speed: 270 km/h (170 mph, 150 kn) VNE, maximum speed with airbrakes open67
- Maximum glide ratio: best 34 at 93 km/h (58 mph; 50 kn)
- Rate of sink: 0.62 m/s (122 ft/min) minimum, at 70 km/h (43 mph; 38 kn)
- Maximum speed in rough air: 189 km/h (117 mph; 102 kn)
