= Viktor Yemelyanov =

Russian footballer

Personal information
- Full name: Viktor Viktorovich Yemelyanov
- Date of birth: 3 July 1987 (age 39)
- Place of birth: Ryazan, Russian SFSR
- Height: 1.80 m (5 ft 11 in)
- Positions: Defender; midfielder

Youth career
- FC Ryazan-Agrokomplekt Ryazan
- Zolotye Kupola Ryazan
- Futbolnoye Delo Moscow

Senior career*
Years	Team	Apps	(Gls)
2006–2007	FC Spartak-MZhK Ryazan	35	(0)
2007–2009	FC Spartak Shchyolkovo	63	(1)
2009–2013	FC Zvezda Ryazan	81	(3)
2013–2014	FC Podolye Podolsky district	14	(1)
- * Club domestic league appearances and goals

Viktor Viktorovich Yemelyanov (Russian: Виктор Викторович Емельянов; born 3 July 1987) is a former Russian professional football player.

== Club career ==
He played in the Russian Football National League for FC Spartak-MZhK Ryazan in 2007.
