= Microjet 200 =

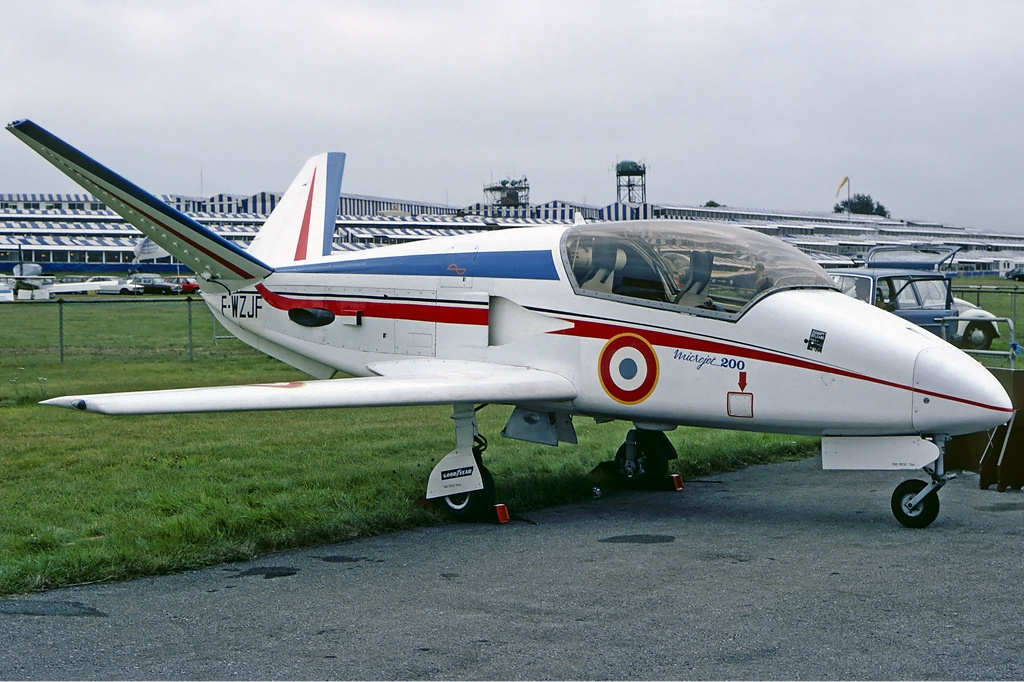
- Microjet 200 prototype at Farnborough Airshow in 1982.

General information
- Type: Lightweight jet trainer
- National origin: France
- Manufacturer: Microjet SA
- Number built: 4

History
- First flight: 24 June 1980

The Microjet 200 was a French jet trainer designed and built by Microjet SA.

== Design and development ==
The aircraft was designed by Microjet SA as a vehicle for the small gas turbine engines produced by Microturbo and as a two-seat lightweight jet trainer. The 200 is a low-wing cantilever monoplane with a retractable tricycle landing gear and a v-tail. It is powered by two Microturbo TRS 18-1 turbojets. It had side-by-side seating for an instructor and student. The all-wood prototype 200 first flew on 24 June 1980. Three pre-production aircraft designated 200B were built of mixed construction and the first flew on 19 May 1983. The third had small winglets on the tail. The project failed to gain any interest and no production aircraft were built.

== Variants ==
200
Prototype, one built.
200B
Pre-production, three built.

== Specifications (200B) ==
Data from Jane's All The World's Aircraft 1988-89

General characteristics

- Crew: 2
- Length: 6.67 m (21 ft 10.5 in)
- Wingspan: 7.56 m (24 ft 9.75 in)
- Height: 2.42 m (7 ft 11.25 in)
- Wing area: 6.12 m^{2} (65.9 sq ft)
- Empty weight: 780 kg (1,719 lb)
- Gross weight: 1,300 kg (2,866 lb)
- Powerplant: 2 × Microturbo TRS 18-1 turbojet engines , 1.30 kN (293 lbf) thrust each

Performance

- Maximum speed: 463 km/h (287 mph, 249 kn)
- Cruise speed: 389 km/h (241 mph, 209 kn)
- Endurance: 2 hours
- Service ceiling: 9,150 m (30,000 ft)
- Rate of climb: 8.7 m/s (1,705 ft/min)
