= EEL ULF 1 =

German single-seat glider, 1977

ULF 1
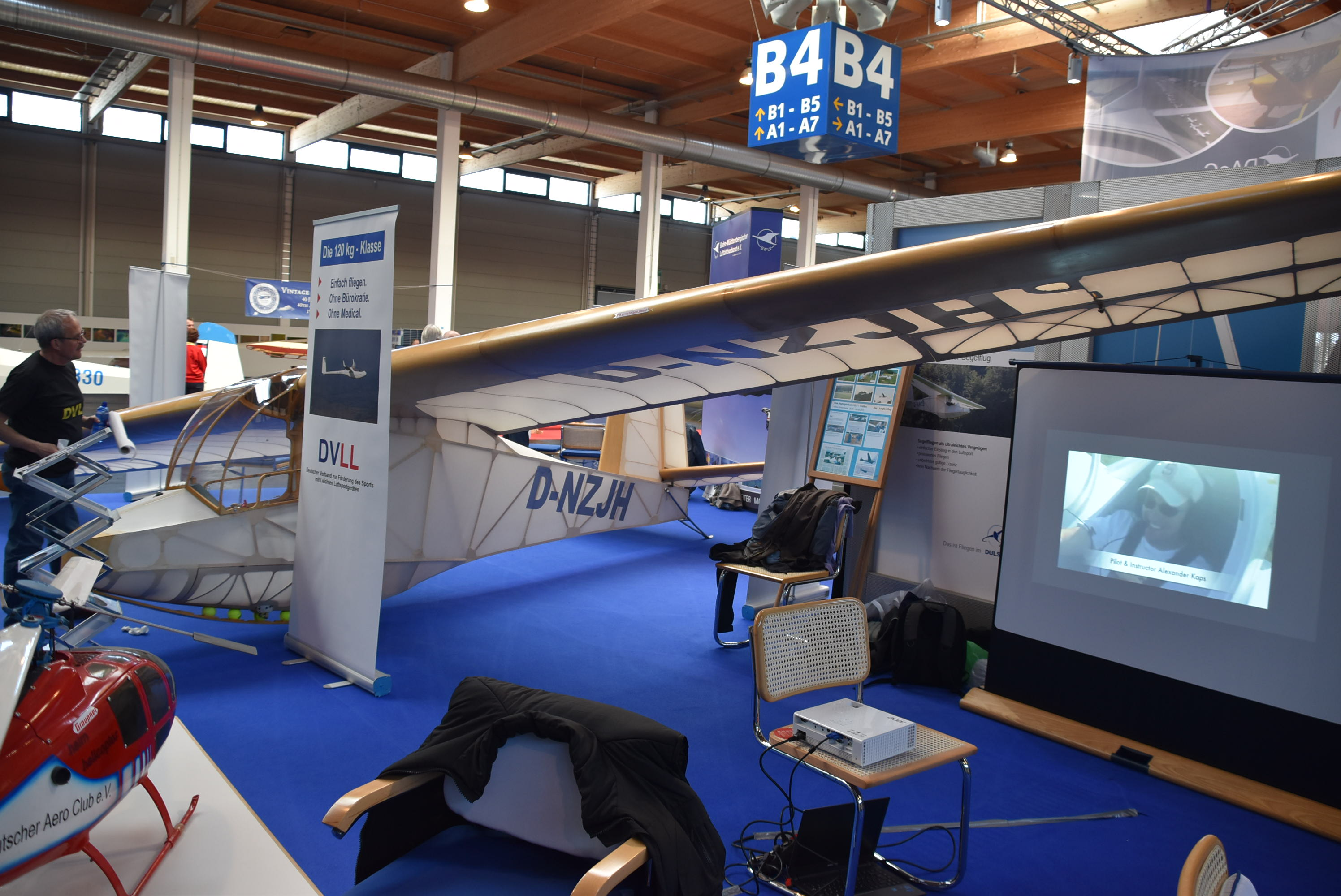

General information
- Type: Glider
- National origin: West Germany
- Manufacturer: Entwicklung und Erprobung von Leichtflugzeugen (EEL)
- Designer: Dieter Reich
- Status: Plans no longer available
- Number built: More than 40

History
- Manufactured: 1978-2019
- Introduction date: August 1978
- First flight: November 1977

The EEL ULF 1 is a West German high-wing, single-seat, foot-launched, microlift glider that was designed by Dieter Reich. When it was available it was provided in the form of plans by Entwicklung und Erprobung von Leichtflugzeugen (EEL) (English: Development and Testing of Light Aircraft) for amateur construction.

== Design and development ==
The ULF 1 was first flown in November 1977 and first shown at the 3rd International Hang Glider Meet at the Wasserkuppe in August 1978. The prototype was built by Reich's partner at EEL, Heiner Neumann. The design was intended to be able to soar in weak ridge and thermal lift.

The aircraft is made from spruce, birch plywood and balsa, covered in doped aircraft fabric and features conventional full three-axis controls. Its two-piece, single-spar 10.4 m (34.1 ft) span wing is a cantilever design and employs a Wortmann FX 63-137 airfoil. Glide path control is via spoilers on the wing top surface. The aircraft is normally flown without a windshield, but a Plexiglas canopy is optional. The aircraft's best glide ratio is 16:1 at 55 km/h (34 mph). With both the canopy and pilot doors fitted the best glide ratio is 18:1. The landing gear is a fixed skid and the aircraft is equipped with a ballistic parachute full aircraft rescue system. The aircraft is normally transported by trailer and can be assembled in 10 minutes.

The ULF 1 was approved in West Germany in July 1980 and Australia in 1983.

The ULF 1 can be foot-launched from slopes of at least 15°. The pilot foot launches the aircraft suspending it on the shoulder harness and, once airborne sits on a retractable slat seat and closes two partial lower doors. It can also be launched by bungee launch, winch-launch, auto-tow and aerotow.

The cost of building the aircraft from plans is estimated by the designer as €2500. In 2011 the plans cost €150 and were available in German and English. The plans consist of 31 blueprint pages and a 37-page construction manual. The manufacturer claims a build time of about 1000 hours.

== Operational history ==
The prototype has flown more than 200 flights totalling over 150 hours, most of which were foot-launched. The longest flight flown by a ULF 1 is six hours and 140 km (87 mi).

More than 40 examples have been completed and flown.

== Specifications (ULF 1) ==
Data from Bertrand and company website

General characteristics

- Crew: one
- Length: 5.55 m (18 ft 3 in)
- Wingspan: 10.4 m (34 ft 1 in)
- Wing area: 13.4 m^{2} (144 sq ft)
- Aspect ratio: 8.10:1
- Airfoil: Wortmann FX 63-137
- Empty weight: 55 kg (121 lb)
- Gross weight: 155 kg (342 lb)

Performance

- Stall speed: 32 km/h (20 mph, 17 kn)
- Never exceed speed: 80 km/h (50 mph, 43 kn)
- g limits: +6/-4
- Maximum glide ratio: 16:1 at 55 km/h (34 mph)
- Rate of sink: 0.8 m/s (160 ft/min)

== See also ==
Related lists

- List of gliders
