= Entwicklung und Erprobung von Leichtflugzeugen =

German aircraft designer

- Company type: Privately held company
- Industry: Aerospace
- Founded: 1976
- Founder: Heiner Neumann and Dieter Reich
- Headquarters: Germany
- Products: Gliders
- Website: www.ulf-2.com

Entwicklung und Erprobung von Leichtflugzeugen (EEL) (English: Development and Testing of Light Aircraft) is a German aircraft design firm based in Putzbrunn. The company was founded in 1976 by Heiner Neumann and Dieter Reich. It specializes in the design of gliders and motor gliders, provided in the form of plans for amateur construction.

== History ==
Both Neumann and Reich studied aeronautics in the early 1960s while at Technische Universität Berlin. Reich designed the two aircraft marketed by EEL.

The EEL ULF 1, a foot-launched microlift glider that weighs 55 kg (121 lb) empty, first flew in November 1977. The EEL ULF 2 is a single-seat motorglider that first flew in October 1993. As a result of his design work on the ULF 2 Reich received the Oskar Ursinus Vereinigung (OUV) Hans-Becker-Prize in June 1997.

== Aircraft ==
Summary of aircraft built by EEL
Model name	First flight	Number built	Type
EEL ULF 1	November 1977	More than 40	microlift glider
EEL ULF 2	October 1993	15	Motor glider

== See also ==
- List of gliders
