= EFF Prometheus =

Swiss jet motorglider

Prometheus

General information
- Type: Two seat turbojet powered motor glider
- National origin: Switzerland
- Manufacturer: Entwicklungsgemeinschaft für Flugzeugbau (EFF)
- Number built: 1 + 1 conversion from a FFA Diamant 18

History
- First flight: 22 June 1978

The EFF Prometheus was an unusual two seat motor glider powered by a pair of small turbojet engines, designed and constructed in Switzerland in the 1970s. Two versions with different spans were built, but it did not go into production.

== Design and development ==
In 1970 EFF began work on a turbojet powered version of the FFA Diamant 18 sailplane. This, named the Prometheus 1, first flew on 21 June 1971. It was initially powered by a 0.745 kN (167.5 lbf) Microturbo Eclair II, later replaced by a 1.18 kN (265.3 lbf) Microturbo TRS 25. The engine was mounted on a short pylon to the rear of the cockpit above the wing centre line. Apart from the addition of the engine and associated fuel tanks and accessories, the aircraft was essentially the single seat Diamant 18. The later Prometheus 19 of 1978 was a two-seat, side-by-side configuration aircraft with a new fuselage, purpose built to contain the wider cockpit and the twin turbojets, a new, mid-mounted wing with a different section and a span, in its initial form, of 19.4 m (63 ft 7.8 in). The all-moving tail of the Diamant was replaced by a conventional one.

Design work on the Prometheus 19 began in about 1971 and construction was started in 1975, leading to a first flight on 22 June 1978. Its wing had a single aluminium spar and was skinned with plywood infilled with glass fibre/foam sandwich. It was fitted with flaperons for lateral control and lift generation, combined with DFS-type airbrakes operating only from the upper wing surface.

The forward fuselage had a wooden structure skinned with glass fibre. The cockpit, ahead of the wing, seated two side by side . Two 0.88 kN (197.8 lbf) Microturbo TRS 18 engines were mounted behind the cockpit, fed from a pair of dorsal intakes immediately aft of the glazing and exhausting over the rear fuselage a little behind the wing trailing edge. This section of the fuselage and the empennage were constructed from glass-fibre sandwich. The Prometheus had a tall, straight edged fin with the narrow chord tailplane and single elevator on top in T-configuration. It landed on a retractable tricycle undercarriage. The mainwheels were sprung on rubber blocks and were fitted with brakes; the nosewheel had an oleo shock absorber.

The Prometheus 12 was a variant with a 12.63 m (41 ft 5.2 in) span wing to improve the performance envelope and increase structural strength.

== Variants ==
Prometheus 1
The first prototype, consisting of a Diamant 18 airframe powered by a 0.745 kN (167.5 lbf) Microturbo Eclair II, later replaced by a 1.18 kN (265.3 lbf) Microturbo TRS 25.
Prometheus 19
The initial production configuration with a span of 19.4 m (63 ft 7.78 in) powered by 2 x 0.88 kN (197.8 lbf) Microturbo TRS 18 engines mounted behind the cockpit. Flown 22 June 1978.
Prometheus 12
Span decreased to 12.63 m (41 ft 5.2 in), wing area 13.21 m^{2} (142.19 sq ft) and the empty weight 668 kg (1,473 lb). First flown 17 September 1979.
Promethus PV
As Prometheus 12, with tip tanks. No production intended.

== Specifications (Prometheus 19) ==
Data from Jane's All the World's Aircraft 1981-82

General characteristics

- Crew: Two
- Length: 8.30 m (27 ft 3 in)
- Wingspan: 19.40 m (63 ft 8 in)
- Height: 1.70 m (5 ft 7 in)
- Wing area: 17.64 m^{2} (189.9 sq ft)
- Aspect ratio: 21.3
- Airfoil: Wortmann FX-67-170-17
- Empty weight: 735 kg (1,620 lb)
- Max takeoff weight: 999 kg (2,202 lb)
- Fuel capacity: 192 L (42 Imp gal; 51 US gal)
- Powerplant: 2 × Microturbo TRS 18 turbojet, 0.88 kN (200 lbf) thrust each

Performance

- g limits: +/-4.0
- Wing loading: 56.6 kg/m^{2} (11.6 lb/sq ft) maximum

Avionics

- VFR plus optional IFR
