= Elżanowski ZE-1 Cytrynka =

ZE-1 Cytrynka

General information
- Type: Basic glider
- National origin: Poland
- Manufacturer: 'Start' Aviation Circle
- Designer: Zbigniew Elżanowski
- Number built: 1

History
- First flight: May 1931

The Elżanowski ZE-1 Cytrynka (Lemon) was a basic training glider built in Poland in 1930 by an amateur group.

== Design and development ==
The Cytrynka was the last and most successful of three gliders designed and built by the youthful 'Start' Aviation Circle in Warsaw. Elżanowski developed its design between 1929 and 1930. Constructed in the Circle's workshop, it was funded by the Warsaw Aeroclub.

It was a high wing monoplane with a two part, rectangular plan wing, built around two spars and largely fabric covered apart from a plywood covered leading edge. Aft of the wing trailing edge the fuselage was an open Warren girder, stiffened by wire bracing from the wings, but the forward part was a rectangular-section plywood structure. This provided a conventional open cockpit for the pilot's seat and controls rather than the totally exposed position of many open-frame designs. The Cytrynka's tailplane was mounted on top of the fuselage frame and braced to its lower chord with a strut on each side. It carried balanced elevators. There was no fin but its rectangular rudder reached upwards from the lower chord well above the elevators, operating in a cut-out.

== Operational history ==
There is uncertainty as to whether the Cytrynka flew late in 1930 or was delayed by winter to the following spring. Cynk dates the first flight to October 1930 at Bezmiechowa but Glass has May 1931. It was then used by its Warsaw Aeroclub sponsors at Bezmiechova to train pilots. In September 1931 they took it as a reserve aircraft on an expedition to Polichno which led to the formation of a gliding club there.

== Specifications ==
Data from samolotypolskie.pl/

General characteristics

- Crew: One
- Length: 5.8 m (19 ft 0 in)
- Wingspan: 9.2 m (30 ft 2 in)
- Height: 2.0 m (6 ft 7 in)
- Wing area: 12.6 m^{2} (136 sq ft)
- Empty weight: 108 kg (238 lb)
- Gross weight: 175 kg (386 lb)
