= Elliotts of Newbury =

British glider manufacturer

- Industry: Joinery, aircraft and glider production
- Founded: 1870
- Founder: Samuel Elliott
- Defunct: 1974
- Fate: Ceased trading, designs passed to Slingsby
- Successor: Slingsby Sailplanes Ltd
- Headquarters: Newbury, Berkshire, England

Elliotts of Newbury was a British company that became well known for manufacturing gliders.

== Beginnings and World War II ==
The company was founded by Samuel Elliott in 1870 as a joinery works, Elliott's Moulding and Joinery Company Ltd. It produced ammunition boxes during the First World War made by a workforce composed 90% of women. It changed to furniture production after the war. In the Second World War, once more a largely female workforce produced components for aircraft, including the Supermarine Spitfire and Supermarine Walrus, de Havilland Tiger Moth, de Havilland Mosquito, Airspeed Oxford, Airspeed Horsa glider. Elliotts manufactured about one third of total Horsa production and were also responsible for a powered version of the General Aircraft Hamilcar glider.

== The Olympia ==
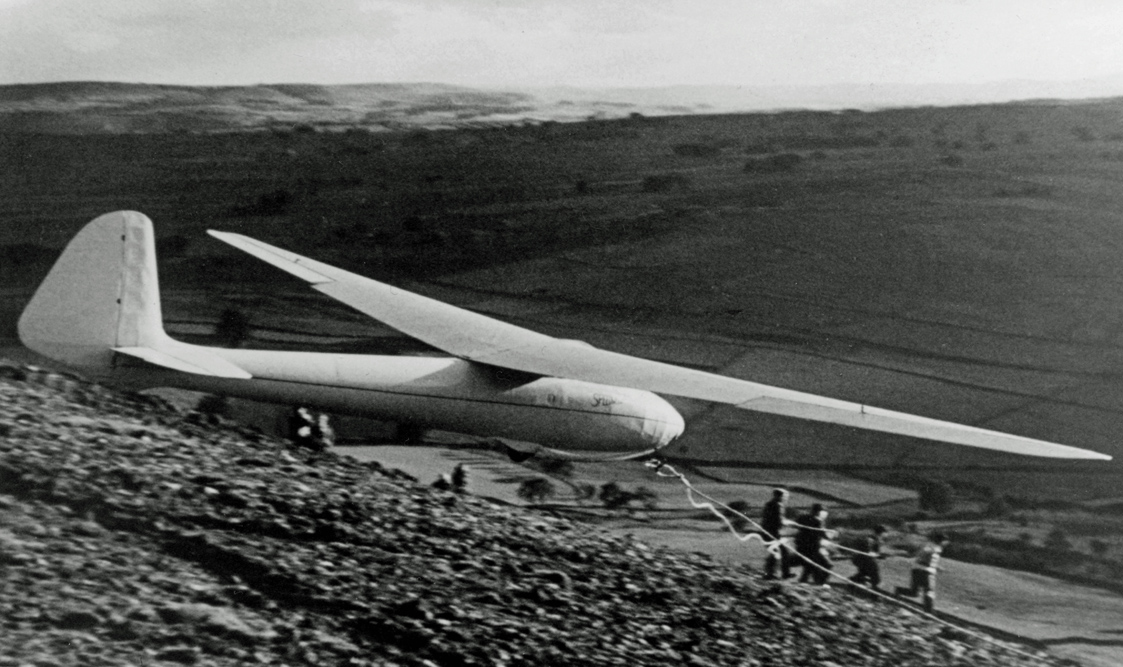
EoN Olympia glider being bungy-launched

At the end of the war, the firm had hoped to resume furniture manufacture but in those times of austerity this was not allowed by the Board of Trade. The company therefore planned to continue with aircraft production. Its first product was the Elliotts Newbury Eon four-seat light aircraft. However the company had also been asked in 1945 by Chilton Aircraft Ltd to make one set of wings for the Chilton Olympia, a glider that was a copy of the DFS Olympia Meise. To maintain employment, Elliotts retained the right to the wing jigs they had made. On completion of the prototype's wings, Elliotts refused to sell the wing jigs to Chilton. One of Chilton's founders, Andrew Dalrymple, was killed in a crash of a Fi Storch on 25 December 1945 near Hungerford, and this event soon ended aircraft production. After the death of Dalrymple an agreement was reached to sell production rights, fuselage jigs and all the work in hand on the redesigned Olympia to Elliotts. The Chilton prototype was eventually declared un-airworthy in 1970 and destroyed. Production of the EoN Olympia commenced in 1946 as a batch of 100, and the first flight was made in January 1947. Elliot's went on to build 150 Olympias.

== Other aircraft projects ==
The Olympia was followed in 1948 by the production of two further German-designed gliders, the Grunau Baby 2b known as the Baby EoN and the SG 38 Schulgleiter primary glider known as the Primary EoN. Elliotts and its design consultants Aviation & Engineering Products Ltd made improvements to each of the designs before starting production.

The prototype of the Newbury Eon light aircraft made its first flight in August 1947. Aviation & Engineering Projects Ltd also worked with Elliotts on an abortive side-by-side trainer project, the Eon T.16/48, derived from the four seater but no further aircraft were produced. However the company acted as a sub-contractor making parts for other aircraft. The Primary flew in 1948 and 80 had been built when production ceased in 1958.

== Later Olympias ==
After building three marks of the Olympia, another improved version, called the EoN Olympia 4.

The only Olympia 401 ever made was built in 1959 (G-APSI, now BGA2372), and this was followed by the 402 in 1956, the 403 in 1957, and in 1958 by the Open Class EoN Type 6 Olympia 419 and the EoN Olympia 415 for the 15-metre FAI Standard Class. The 415 did not go into production, and only eight 419s were built.

The EoN Olympia 460 was built in 1961 as a completely new Standard Class glider. The Olympia 460 was meant to be a world beating standard class glider. However the prototype was overweight against its design weight, and at low speeds suffered a marked buffet from the wing roots and aft of the canopy. Horace Buckingham decided on a lower aspect ratio, despite opposition from the designer, Harry Midwood, and the chief test pilot, David Ince. The less competitive Olympia 463 became the production model in 1963. It also had a wider fuselage at the front. Elliotts built 5 460s and 48 463s. A special version of the 460 series called the EoN Olympia 465, was developed for the 1965 World Gliding Championships.

== Closure ==
In the summer of 1965 the managing director of Elliotts, Horace Buckingham, died. The company reviewed its business and decided that glider production was unprofitable. Slingsby Sailplanes Ltd agreed to take over the production of EoN sailplanes in 1966, but no Elliott designed glider was ever built by Slingsby, though spares were supplied and repairs were undertaken.

Elliotts closed in 1974. The factory was demolished in the late 1970s to make way for Bayer's UK headquarters.

== Aircraft ==
- EoN Type 4 Newbury EoN
- EoN Type 5 Olympia 1
- EoN Type 5 Olympia 2
- EoN Type 5 Olympia 3
- EoN Type 5 Olympia 4
- EoN Type 5 Olympia 401
- EoN Type 5 Olympia 402
- EoN Type 6 Olympia 403
- EoN Type 6 Olympia 415
- EoN Type 6 Olympia 419
- EoN Type 7 SG-38 Primary
- EoN Type 9 K-1 – Kendall K.1
- EoN Type 8 Baby Eon
- EoN Type 10 Eon 460
- EoN Type 10 Eon 463
- EoN Type 10 Eon 465
- EoN Target – project only
