= EoN Olympia =

British single-seat glider, 1947

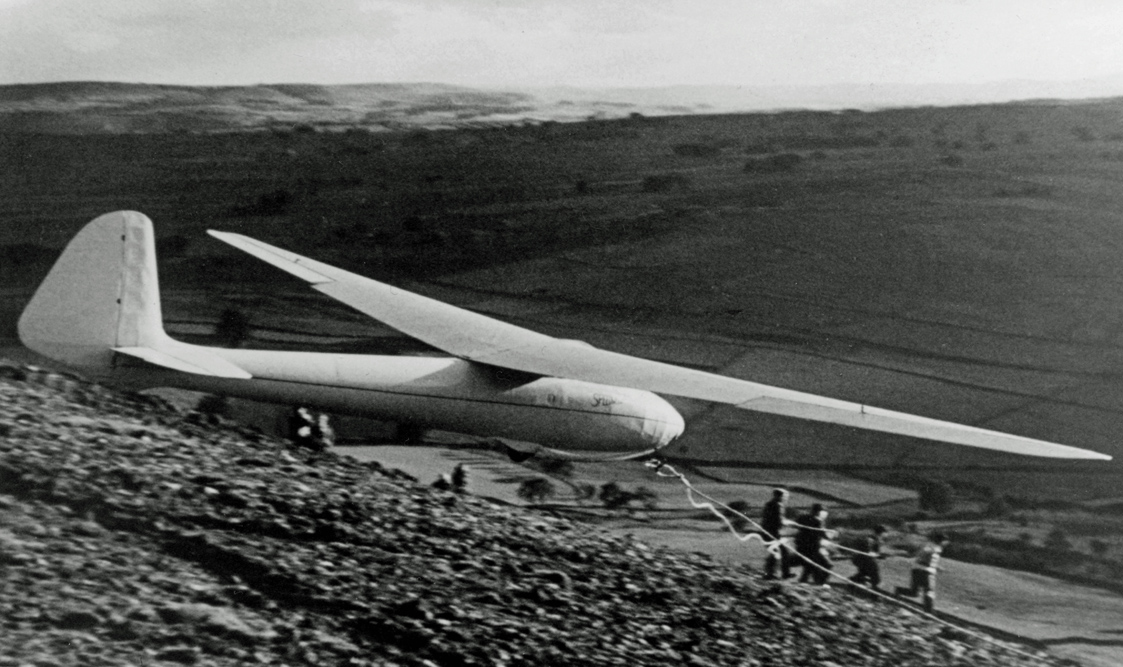
- Olympia being bungee-launched at Camphill, Great Hucklow, Derbyshire

General information
- Type: Glider
- Manufacturer: Elliotts of Newbury
- Designer: Hans Jacobs
- Number built: 150

History
- First flight: January 1947

The Eon Olympia was a glider produced from 1947 by Elliotts of Newbury.

== Design and development ==
Elliotts had been asked in 1945 by Chilton Aircraft Ltd to make one set of wings for the Chilton Olympia, a glider that had been developed in pre-war Germany as the DFS Olympia Meise. This had been designed by Hans Jacobs and selected as the glider for the 1940 Summer Olympics. The German drawings were not detailed and so new drawings were made by Chilton which retained the Meise Olympia's aerodynamic shape. The wing redesign resulted in a stronger and heavier (+30 kg) aircraft. To maintain employment at their factory, Elliotts refused to sell the wing jigs that they had made for the prototype. Consequently, Chilton gave up all aircraft work, agreeing to sell to Elliotts the production rights, fuselage jigs, and work in hand on all Olympia gliders.

Production of the Olympia (originally called Type 5) started in 1946 as a batch of 100, and the first flight was made in January 1947. Elliotts and their design consultants Aviation & Engineering Products Ltd made improvements to the original design before starting production. Marks 1, 2 and 3 were produced, mainly distinguishable by the landing gear. The Mark 1 had only a skid whereas the Olympia 2 had a built-in main wheel. The Eon Olympia 3's wheel was jettisonable after takeoff. The first batch of 100 was completed in 1947 but the market could not absorb such a large number, despite the low price of £425. Even by 1953, 40 of the first 100 Olympias were still unsold. Nevertheless, a second batch of 50 was built. Gliders from the second batch were still being offered for sale for £800 as late as 1957 in order to clear the stock, despite being below cost price.

After building three marks of the Olympia, another improved version, called the EoN Olympia 4 was produced in 1954. This is regarded as being sufficiently different from the original as being a new type. This type in turn led to a succession of variants.

== Operational history ==
On 24 August 1950 an Eon Olympia flown by Bill Bedford broke the British distance record by flying 310 km in 3:50 hr. On 2 May 1951 Bedford broke his record with a flight of 413 km from Farnborough to Newcastle. Olympias also broke height records on occasions, culminating in a flight by Gordon Rondel on 18 June 1960 in a thunderstorm to 9,321 m (30,580 ft) with gain of height of 8,870 m (29,100 ft), absolute National height and gain of height records. An example is now on display at the Gliding Heritage Centre.

== Variants ==
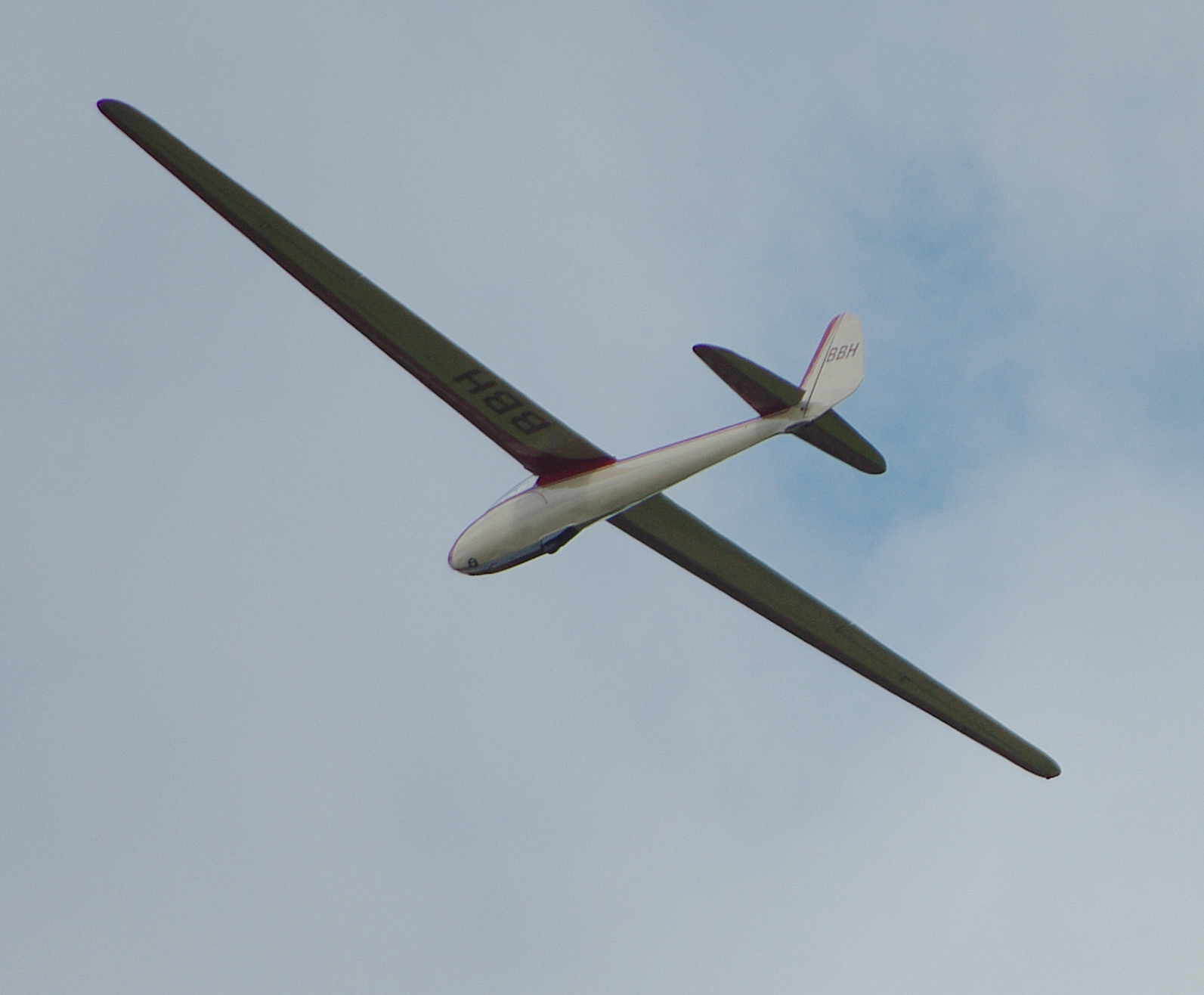
Olympia 2 BBH/BGA834 at the Vintage Glider Rally at Camphill, 2011

Data from Ellison, 1971

EoN Type 5 Olympia 1
Improved Olympia-Meise. Landing skid.
EoN Type 5 Olympia 2
Fixed monowheel.
EoN Type 5 Olympia 3
Jestisonable dolly wheels and skid.
EoN Type 5 Olympia 4
New wing section, NACA 64_{3}618 at root, 64_{3}421 at tip
EoN Type 5 Olympia 401
Revised 4, with new nose and square-cut empennage. 180 mm (7 in) shorter.
EoN Type 5 Olympia 402
As 4, modified for 1956 World Gliding Championships with 17.0 m (55 ft 9 in) span.
EoN Type 6 Olympia 403
1957 development of Olympia 402, with strengthened and shortened fuselage (7.47 m (24 ft 6 in)). New fin and rudder, all-moving tailplane.
Eon Type 6 Olympia 415
1958 Standard class (15.0 m (49 ft 3 in)) span version of 419.
Eon Type 6 Olympia 419
Long span (18.9 m (62 ft 0 in)), long fuselage (7.77 m (25 ft 6 in)) version of 403.

== Specifications (Olympia 2) ==
Data from The World's Sailplanes:Die Segelflugzeuge der Welt:Les Planeurs du Monde

General characteristics

- Crew: 1
- Length: 21 ft 8 in (6.61 m)
- Wingspan: 49 ft 3 in (15 m)
- Wing area: 160 sq ft (15 m^{2})
- Aspect ratio: 15
- Airfoil: root:Göttingen 549 (mod.), tip:Göttingen 676
- Empty weight: 430 lb (195 kg)
- Max takeoff weight: 670 lb (304 kg)

Performance

- Stall speed: 31 mph (50 km/h, 27 kn)
- Never exceed speed: 129 mph (208 km/h, 112 kn)
- Rough air speed max: 128 km/h (79.5 mph; 69.1 kn)
- Aerotow speed: 100 km/h (62.1 mph; 54.0 kn)
- Winch launch speed: 100 km/h (62.1 mph; 54.0 kn)
- Maximum glide ratio: ~25 at 72.5 km/h (45.0 mph; 39.1 kn)
- Rate of sink: 132 ft/min (0.67 m/s) at 63 km/h (39.1 mph; 34.0 kn)
- Wing loading: 4.1 lb/sq ft (20 kg/m^{2})

== See also ==
Related development

- DFS Olympia Meise

Aircraft of comparable role, configuration, and era

- Slingsby Skylark 2
