= FFA Diamant =

Swiss glider, 1964

Diamant
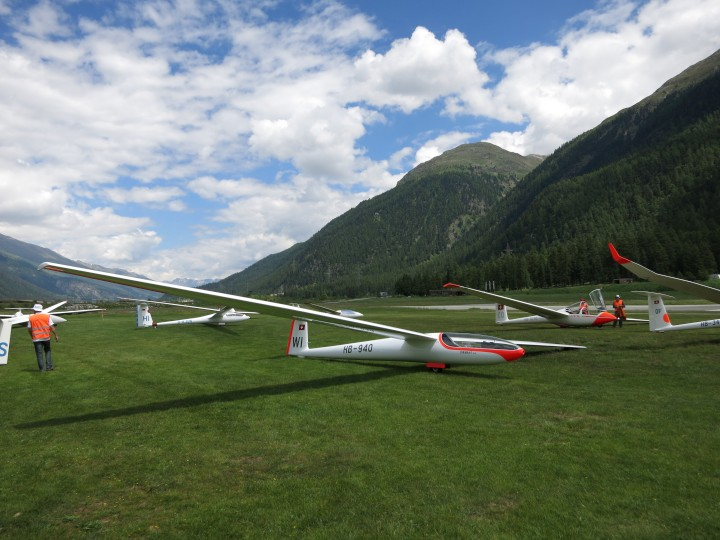
- Diamant 16.5

General information
- Type: Glider
- National origin: Switzerland
- Manufacturer: Flug- und Fahrzeugwerke Altenrhein
- Status: Production completed in about 1970
- Number built: About 86 (all models)

History
- First flight: 1964

The FFA Diamant (English: Diamond) is a family of Swiss high-wing, T-tailed, single-seat, FAI Standard Class and FAI Open Class gliders that was designed by engineering students under supervision of Professor Rauscher at the ETH Zurich and manufactured by Flug- und Fahrzeugwerke Altenrhein AG (FFA) of Altenrhein, Switzerland.

The Diamant is noted as the first glider that was built entirely from glassfibre, with no other materials, such as balsa, used as a sandwich.

== Design and development ==
The initial student prototype design used the wings from a Schleicher Ka 6, but these were replaced on production aircraft with Glasflügel H-301 wings.

FFA started manufacture of the 15 m (49.2 ft) wingspan Diamant HBV model as its first attempt to build a sailplane. The Swiss company had been part of Dornier Flugzeugwerke, but was split off as a separate company after the Second World War and was pursuing new lines of business.

FFA built three different models of the Diamant, the HBV, the 16.5, and 18. The early model 16.5 and 18s had issues with structural flutter at high speeds, but this was rectified by FFA for customer aircraft.

The HBV and 16.5 were type certified in the United States, while the 18 was in the Experimental - Racing category. The type certificate for the HBV and 16.5 requires that "all external portions of the glider exposed to sunlight must be painted white. Registration and Competition numbers must be painted blue-gray, or in any other light colours."

== Operational history ==
Diamant 18s were entered in the 1968 World Gliding Championships, held in Leszno, Poland and placed third and fourth. Ross Briegleb won the 1970 US Nationals at El Mirage, California flying a Diamant 18. He also set the national speed record for the 100 km (62.1 mi) at 88.62 mph (143 km/h).

In June 2011 there were still five Diamant HBVs, 20 Diamant 16.5s and five Diamant 18s registered in the United States.

== Variants ==
Diamant HBV
With a 15 m (49.2 ft) wingspan the HBV was designed for the Standard Class. It uses the wings from a Glasflügel H-301 Libelle and mates them with a fully reclined cockpit and a new T-tailed fuselage. The model also has water ballast and a retractable monowheel landing gear. Thirteen were built before it was replaced in production by the 16.5. Certified by the FAA on 7 June 1967.
Diamant 16.5
The 16.5 is named for its 16.5 m (54.1 ft) wingspan, which placed it in the Open Class at the time of its construction. The aircraft was introduced in 1967, and unlike the HBV, the wings of which were built by Glasflügel, the 16.5 was entirely built by FFA. It was this model that was the first all-fiberglass sailplane. Forty-three were built. Certified by the FAA on 1 July 1969.
Diamant 18
The Diamant 18 is identical to the 16.5, but with a 18 m (59.1 ft) wingspan. The airfoil is a modified Wortmann section designated as the FX 62-K-153m. The wing was extended inboard, with new flap sections added and new wing tip fairings. First flown in 1968, about 30 were built.
Pierson Diamant 19
Dan Pierson of Los Angeles, California purchased a Diamant 18 and modified it through a drag-reduction and performance enhancement program, including fairing, reshaping the wingroots and T-tail junction, plus giving it a pointed nose and 320 lb (145 kg) of water ballast. The landing gear was strengthened for higher gross weights and the wingspan increased to 19 m (62.3 ft), including aileron extensions. Control configuration was modified to allow new configurations of flaps and drooped ailerons to improve thermalling performance. The resulting aircraft out-performed the unmodified Diamant 18. In 1983 it was reported that Pierson was planning to use the wings for a two-seat glider and build new wings for the existing fuselage. This aircraft was registered with the US Federal Aviation Administration as an experimental.
EFF Prometheus 1
In late 1970s Entwicklungsgemeinschaft für Flugzeugbau (EFF) built an experimental powered sailplane using the airframe of a Diamant 18 fitted with a Microturbo Eclair II turbojet engine, later replaced with a Microturbo TRS 25. The engine is mounted on a pylon above the wing centre section, fuel tanks were located in both wings (40 litre each) and a 1.8 litre tank in the fuselage.

== Specifications (Diamant 18) ==
Data from Sailplane Directory, Soaring and The Incomplete Guide to Airfoil Usage

General characteristics

- Crew: one
- Wingspan: 18 m (59 ft 1 in)
- Wing area: 14.3 m^{2} (154 sq ft)
- Aspect ratio: 22.7:1
- Airfoil: Wortmann FX 62-K-153m
- Empty weight: 279 kg (615 lb)
- Gross weight: 440 kg (970 lb)

Performance

- Maximum glide ratio: 45 at 62 mph (100 km/h)
- Rate of sink: 0.52 m/s (102 ft/min) at 45 mph (72 km/h)
- Wing loading: 31 kg/m^{2} (6.3 lb/sq ft) with water ballast, 5.2 lb/sq ft without

== See also ==
Aircraft of comparable role, configuration, and era

- Bölkow Phoebus

Related lists

- List of gliders
