= EEL ULF 2 =

German single-seat motor glider, 1993

EEL ULF-2
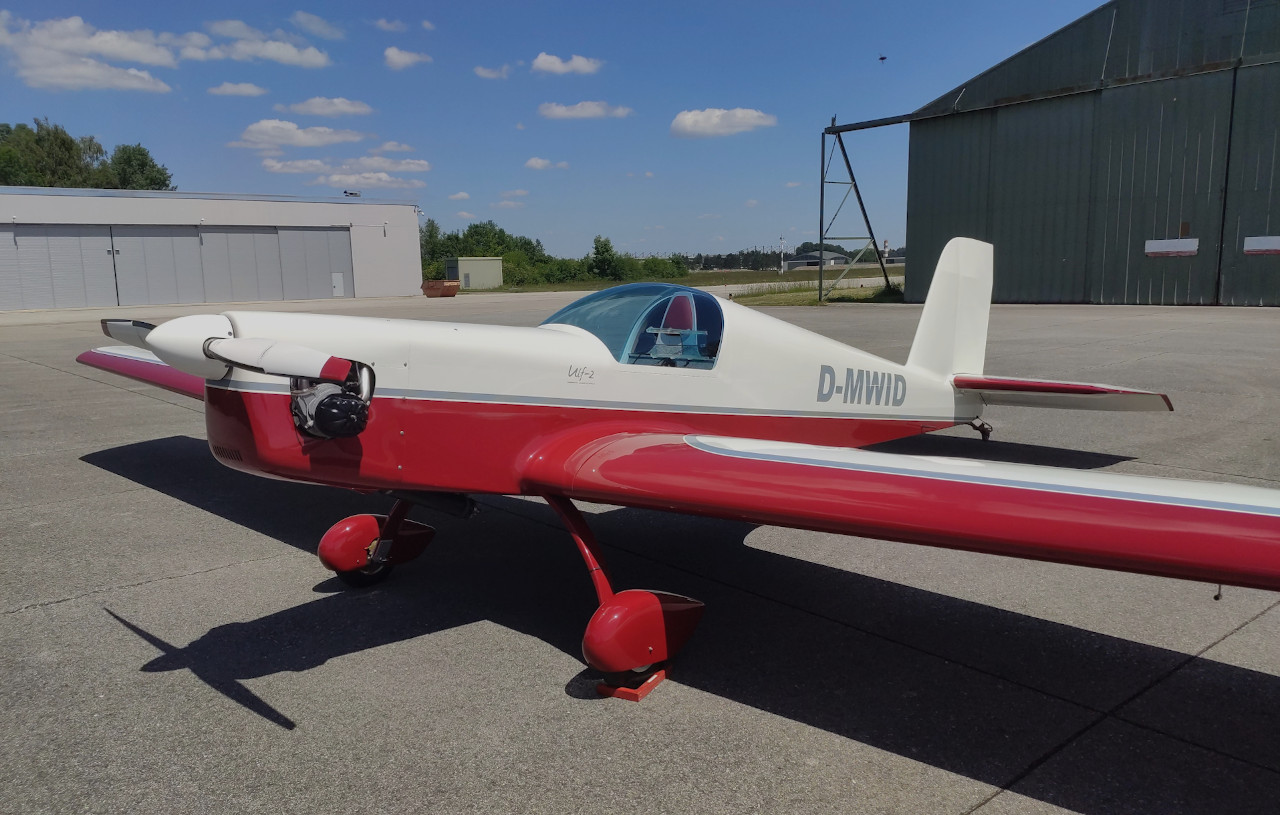

General information
- Type: Microlight
- National origin: Germany
- Manufacturer: Entwicklung und Erprobung von Leichtflugzeugen (EEL)
- Designer: Dieter Reich
- Number built: 15 (2019)

History
- First flight: October 1993

The EEL ULF-2 is a German low-wing, conventional landing gear, single-seat motor glider that was designed by Dieter Reich and is provided in the form of plans by Entwicklung und Erprobung von Leichtflugzeugen (English: Development and Testing of Light Aircraft) for amateur construction.

== Design and development ==
The prototype was built in 1993 by Anton Quanz with Horst Fischer building the engine installation and electrical system. The ULF-2 first flew in October 1993.

The ULF-2 is predominantly constructed from northern pine or Douglas fir, with spruce and birch plywood and covered with doped aircraft fabric. The engine cowling, wing tips and fairings are made from fibreglass. The 11 m (36.1 ft) span wing features a Wortmann FX 63-137 airfoil and top surface spoilers. The aircraft mounts a ballistic parachute full-aircraft recovery system. The landing gear is conventional with a steerable tailwheel. The 54 cm (21 in) wide cockpit features a pilot seat inclined at a 33° angle.

The recommended engine is from a Citroën Visa automobile, which consumes 4.0 L/h (1.06 US gallon per hour) and produces 24 kW (32 hp). The engine retains its automobile muffler and catalytic converter, runs on unleaded auto fuel, stored in a fuselage-mounted aluminium fuel tank with a capacity of 33 litres (7.3 imp gal; 8.7 US gal). The propeller is powered via a belt reduction drive. The muffler system allows the aircraft to comply with the ICAO Annex 16, Chapt. 10 noise requirements of 55 dB(A).

The aircraft's wings fold on gimbal joints for storage or ground transportation in a trailer.

The ULF-2 received its Certificate of Airworthiness in February 1995. As a result of his design work Reich received the OUV Hans-Becker-Prize in June 1997. The plans consists of 29 sheets of blueprints, a 50-page construction manual and a 20-page flight manual, available in both English and German. The plans cost €350 and a completed aircraft is estimated to cost €8000.

The aircraft has very benign stall characteristics, resulting in a controllable slow speed mush condition.

== Operational history ==
The first ULF-2 completed by a customer was flown in 1999 and a total 15 have been finished and flown.

== Specifications (ULF-2) ==
Data from World Directory of Leisure Aviation 2003-04 and company website

General characteristics

- Crew: one
- Wingspan: 11 m (36 ft 1 in)
- Wing area: 13.9 m^{2} (150 sq ft)
- Aspect ratio: 8.7:1
- Airfoil: Wortmann FX 63-137
- Empty weight: 210 kg (463 lb)
- Gross weight: 323 kg (712 lb)
- Fuel capacity: 33 litres (7.3 imp gal; 8.7 US gal)
- Powerplant: 1 × Citroën Visa two-cylinder, four stroke, horizontally opposed automobile engine with belt reduction drive, 24 kW (32 hp)
- Propellers: 2-bladed wooden

Performance

- Cruise speed: 120 km/h (75 mph, 65 kn)
- Stall speed: 50 km/h (31 mph, 27 kn)
- Never exceed speed: 140 km/h (87 mph, 76 kn)
- g limits: +6/-3
- Maximum glide ratio: 14:1
- Rate of climb: 3.0 m/s (590 ft/min)
- Rate of sink: 1.1 m/s (220 ft/min)

== See also ==
- List of gliders

Aircraft of comparable role, configuration, and era

- US Aviation Cumulus
