= Emelyanov KIM-3 Stakanovets =

Glider

Stakhanovets

General information
- Type: High performance two seat glider
- National origin: USSR
- Designer: V. Emilyanov

History
- First flight: 1936

The Emelyanov KIM-3 Stakanovets (Russian: Стаха́новеԥ) was a record breaking two seat glider, one of the first high performance sailplanes to use forward swept wings. It repeatedly set new international distance records in the late 1930s and early 1940s.

== Design and development ==
The Stakhanvetz was both innovative and highly efficient. Named in honour Alexey Stakhanov, a Soviet miner internationally celebrated for his work rate, it was a tandem two seat, wood and fabric sailplane with a shoulder wing distinguished by strong forward sweep. This then novel arrangement enabled the rear seat to be at the centre of gravity but forward of the wing, giving its occupant a clear downwards view. It also helped to prevent tip stalling, the precursor to a spin, without the disadvantage of washout at high speeds. The CAGI RII airfoil, a flat bottomed section, decreased in thickness to chord ratio along the span. Built around a single spar, the wing was also strongly straight tapered in plan, with a taper ratio of 0.18. Near the roots the wing was plywood covered forward of a diagonal sub-spar; further out the ply covering ran around the leading edge from the main spar forming a D-shaped torsion box. The rest of the wing was fabric-covered, including the half-span, tapered ailerons. The wing tips were fine, elliptical and down-turned to protect the wing on the ground.

The Stakhanovetz had an elliptical cross section, ply covered fuselage. Both cockpits were ahead of the wing, with separate multi-transparency canopies under a continuous roof line. Aft, the fuselage became progressively more slender towards the tail. The ply covered tailplane, mounted on top of the fuselage was very narrow and straight edged but the broad, fabric covered elevators were semi-elliptical, ending in rounded tips. The ply covered fin was broader than the tailplane and had a curved leading edge, mounting a semi-circular, fabric covered rudder which extended down to a small tail bumper. The Stakanovetz landed on a very shallow unsprung skid beginning just behind the nose and reaching past the rear cockpit.

== Operational history ==
The Stakhanovetz first flew in 1936. Its strongly forward swept wing has since become common on two seat gliders. Though its handling characteristics are not recorded, its continuous resetting of International distance records suggest it was the outstanding two seater of its day. In 1938 Kartachev and Savtov flew 619 km (385 mi). It also set goal records: in 1939 Kartachev and Gorokhova reached 393.7 km (244.6 mi) and in 1940 Kartachev and Petretschenkova extended this to 495 km (308 mi). Women's two-seat records were also set by Klepikova and Bordina with a goal flight of 223.6 km (138.9 mi) in 1939 and a distance flight of 443.7 km (275.7 mi) in 1940. One was on display at the 1936 Paris Aero Show.

== Specifications ==
Data from Sailplanes 1920-1945 (2006)

General characteristics

- Crew: Two
- Length: 8.10 m (26 ft 7 in)
- Wingspan: 20.20 m (66 ft 3 in)
- Wing area: 23 m^{2} (250 sq ft)
- Aspect ratio: 17.74
- Airfoil: CAGI RIII
- Empty weight: 294 kg (648 lb)
- Gross weight: 454 kg (1,001 lb)
- Wing loading: 19.7 kg/m^{2} (4.0 lb/sq ft)

Performance

- Cruise speed: 75 km/h (47 mph, 40 kn)
- Minimum control speed: 50 km/h (31 mph, 27 kn)
- Rate of sink: 0.65 m/s (128 ft/min) minimum
