= Spatz (disambiguation) =

Spatz was an ITV children's television programme.

Spatz may also refer to:

- Spatz (automobile), a German microcar
- Mount Spatz, a mountain of Antarctica
- Scheibe Spatz, a German glider
- Scheibe SF-30 Club-Spatz, a German sailplane
- Stadler SPATZ, a multiple unit railcar
- Spatz (surname)

== See also ==
- Spats (disambiguation)
- Spaatz (disambiguation)
