= Scheibe Tandem-Falke =

German touring motor glider, 1971

SF 28 Tandem-Falke
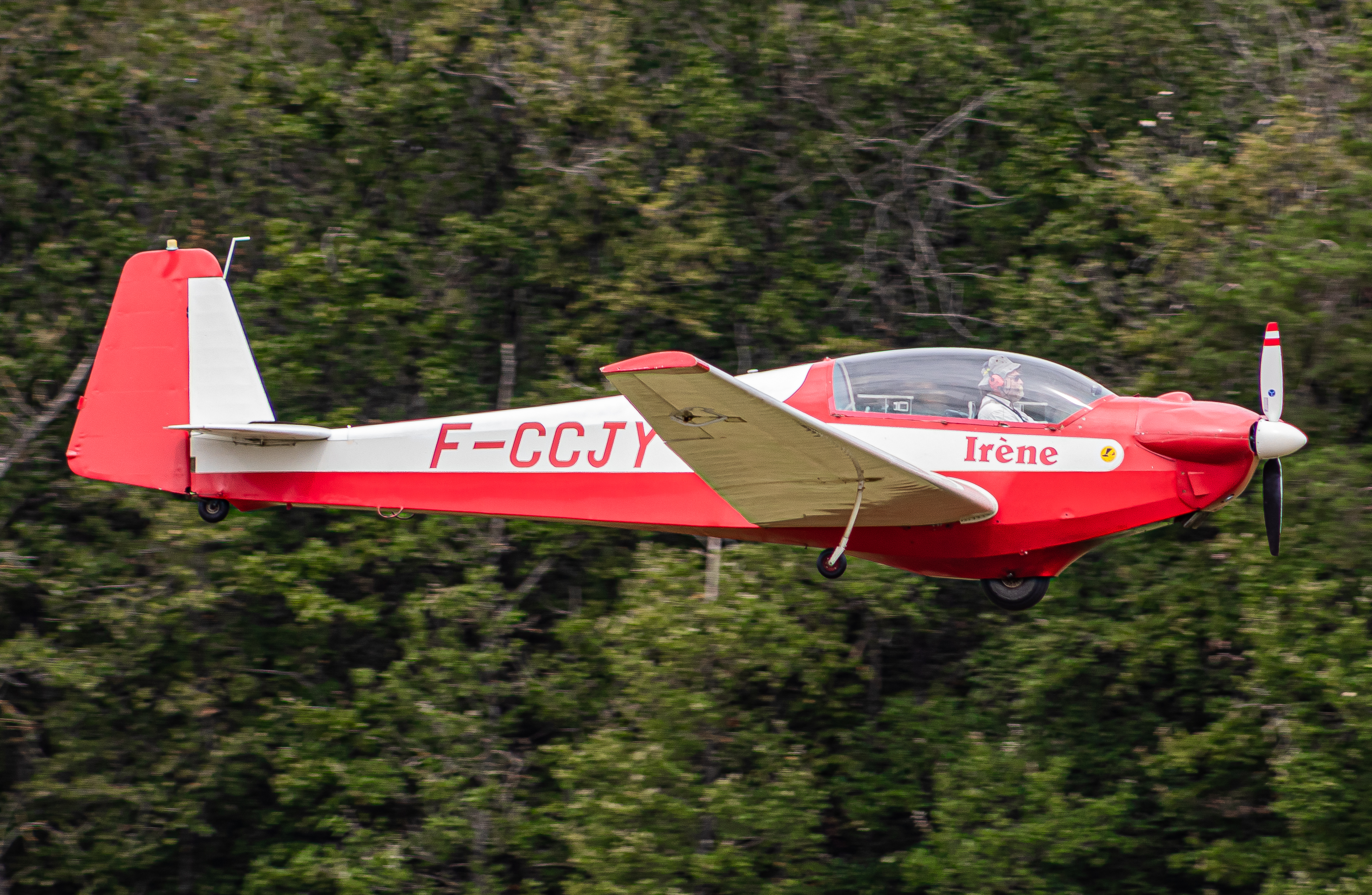
- Tandem Falke Landing

General information
- Type: Motorglider
- National origin: Germany
- Manufacturer: Scheibe
- Designer: Egon Scheibe
- Number built: 119 by 1985

History
- First flight: May 1971
- Developed from: Scheibe Falke

The Scheibe SF 28 Tandem-Falke (English: "falcon") is a German motorglider that was designed by Egon Scheibe in 1970 and which flew for the first time in May the following year. It was a development of the Scheibe Falke with (as its name suggests) seating in tandem rather than side-by-side as in the original Falke design.

== Development ==
The SF 28 is a low-wing, cantilever monoplane of conventional design with a large perspex canopy. The undercarriage consists of a non-retractable monowheel and a steerable tailwheel, linked to the rudder. Small outrigger wheels are fitted to nylon legs under each wing. The fuselage is of steel tube construction, covered in fabric and the wings are constructed of wood and fabric around a single spar.

== Operational history ==
Scheibe entered at least one Tandem-Falke in the German Motor Glider Competition of 1977. At least one SF28 was used by the Spanish military as 'UE 16-1' and demobilized in April 2008.

== Specifications (SF 28A) ==
Data from Jane's all the world's aircraft, 1985-86

General characteristics

- Crew: 1
- Capacity: 1
- Length: 8.1 m (26 ft 7 in)
- Wingspan: 16.3 m (53 ft 6 in)
- Height: 1.55 m (5 ft 1 in)
- Wing area: 18.5 m^{2} (199 sq ft)
- Aspect ratio: 14.5
- Airfoil: Göttingen 533
- Empty weight: 410 kg (904 lb)
- Max takeoff weight: 610 kg (1,345 lb)
- Powerplant: 1 × Limbach SL 1700 4-cyl. air-cooled horizontally-opposed piston engine, 49 kW (66 hp)

Performance

- Maximum speed: 180 km/h (110 mph, 97 kn)
- Range: 520 km (320 mi, 280 nmi)
- Service ceiling: 5,000 m (16,000 ft)
- Maximum glide ratio: 26:1 at 85 km/h (46 kn; 53 mph)
- Rate of sink: 0.9 m/s (180 ft/min) at 69 km/h (37 kn; 43 mph)
- Wing loading: 32.99 kg/m^{2} (6.76 lb/sq ft)

== See also ==
Aircraft of comparable role, configuration, and era

- Fournier RF 5

Related lists

- List of motor gliders
