= Scheibe SF 32 =

German motor glider, 1976

SF 32

General information
- Type: Motorglider
- National origin: Germany
- Manufacturer: Scheibe
- Designer: Egon Scheibe
- Number built: 1

History
- First flight: May 1976
- Developed from: Scheibe SF 27M

The Scheibe SF 32 is a German motorglider that was designed by Egon Scheibe in the 1970s.

== Design ==
The SF 32 was similar to the SF 27M but differs in having a Rotax 642 mounted on a pylon, retracted into the fuselage electrically.

== Specifications ==
Data from

General characteristics

- Crew: 1
- Length: 7.0 m (23 ft 0 in)
- Wingspan: 17.0 m (55 ft 9 in)
- Height: 1.25 m (4 ft 1 in)
- Wing area: 13.3 m^{2} (143 sq ft)
- Aspect ratio: 21.73
- Airfoil: Wortmann FX-61 -163/60-126
- Empty weight: 340 kg (750 lb)
- Max takeoff weight: 450 kg (992 lb)
- Powerplant: 1 × Rotax 642 2-cyl. air-cooled horizontally-opposed piston engine, 30 kW (40 hp)
- Propellers: 2-bladed fixed-pitch wooden propeller

Performance

- Maximum speed: 136 km/h (85 mph, 73 kn)
- Stall speed: 68 km/h (42 mph, 36.5 kn)
- Range: 300 km (190 mi, 160 nmi)
- Maximum glide ratio: 37:1 at 90 km/h (49 kn; 56 mph)
- Rate of climb: 2 m/s (390 ft/min)
- Rate of sink: 0.65 m/s (128 ft/min) at 80 km/h (43 kn; 50 mph)
- Wing loading: 33.8 kg/m^{2} (6.9 lb/sq ft)
- Take-off run: 200 m (660 ft)
