= Sportavia-Pützer SFS 31 Milan =

German motor glider, 1969

SFS 31 Milan
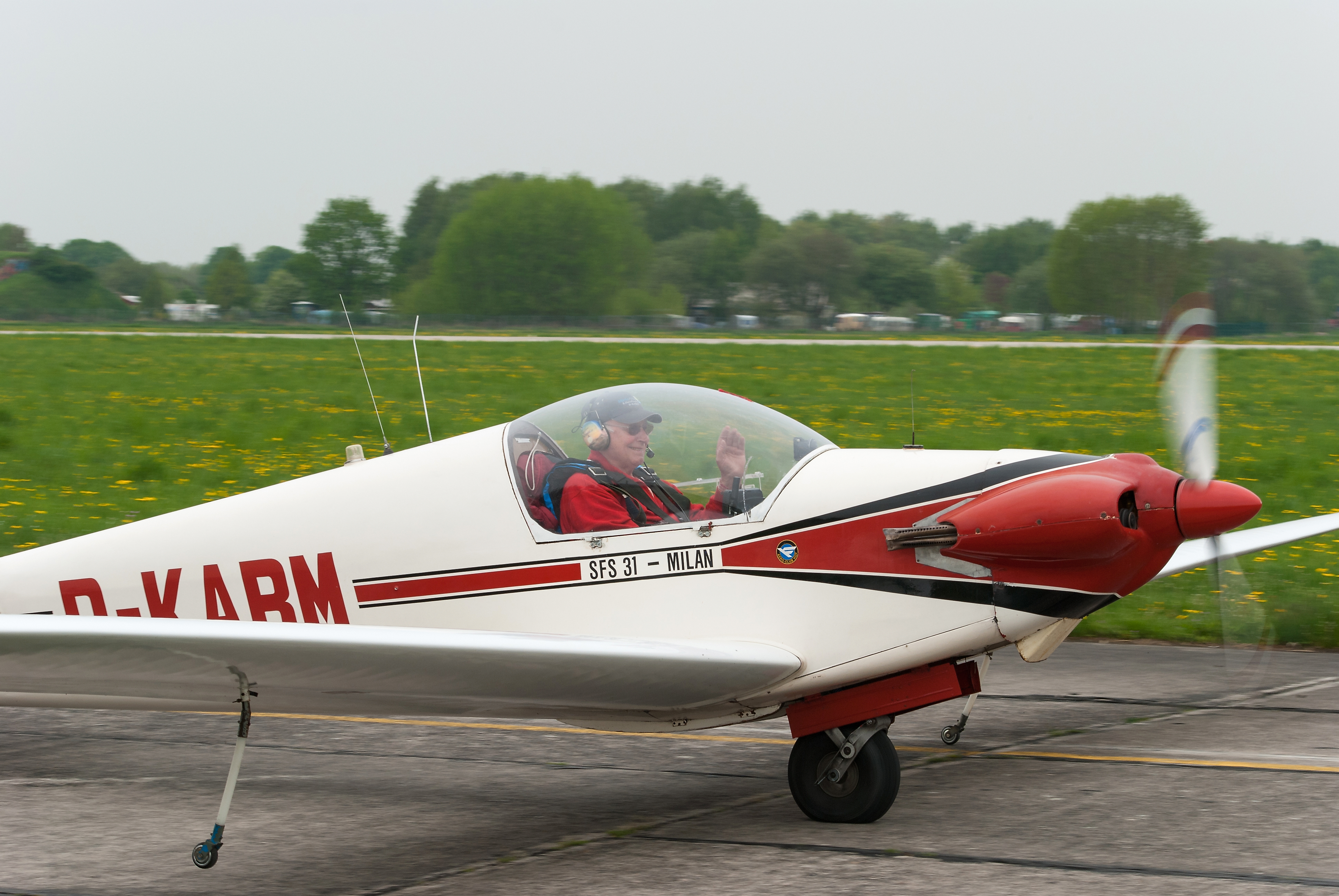
- SFS 31

General information
- Type: Motor glider
- National origin: Germany
- Manufacturer: Sportavia-Pützer; Scheibe Flugzeugbau
- Number built: 14 by 1973

History
- First flight: 31 August 1969
- Developed from: Fournier RF 4 Scheibe SF-27

The Sportavia-Pützer SFS 31 Milan is a single-seat motor glider that was produced in Germany in the early 1970s.

== Design and development ==
The Milan was created by essentially combining the fuselage of the Fournier RF 4 with the wings of the Scheibe SF-27. The resulting aircraft is a conventional motorglider design, a low-wing cantilever monoplane with a nose-mounted engine. The undercarriage consists of a single retractable mainwheel, a fixed tailwheel, and an outrigger under each wing. Construction is of wood, skinned in plywood and fabric. The designation was created by combining the initials of the manufacturers involved (Sportavia-Pützer, Fournier , and Scheibe), and adding the sum of the model numbers of the two constituent aircraft designs.

The SFS 31 prototype (registered D-KORO) first flew on 31 August 1969 and soon replaced the RF 4D in production at Sportavia-Pützer. In 1971, Hans Huth piloted an SFS 31 to third place in the German national motorglider competition.

== Specifications ==
Data from Taylor 1977, p.560, except as noted

General characteristics

- Crew: one pilot
- Length: 6.05 m (19 ft 10 in)
- Wingspan: 15.00 m (49 ft 3 in)
- Height: 1.57 m (5 ft 2 in)
- Wing area: 12.0 m^{2} (129 sq ft)
- Aspect ratio: 18.6
- Airfoil: Wortmann FX-61-184 at root, Wortmann FX-60-126 at tip
- Empty weight: 310 kg (683 lb)
- Gross weight: 440 kg (970 lb)
- Powerplant: 1 × Rectimo 4 AR 1200 , 29 kW (39 hp)

Performance

- Cruise speed: 180 km/h (112 mph, 97 kn)
- Range: 670 km (415 mi, 361 nmi)
- Service ceiling: 6,000 m (19,700 ft)
- Maximum glide ratio: 29:1
- Rate of climb: 3.0 m/s (590 ft/min)
