= Scheibe SF-30 Club-Spatz =

German single-seat glider, 1974

SF-30 Club-Spatz

General information
- Type: Single seat Club class sailplane
- National origin: Germany
- Manufacturer: Scheibe Flugzeugbau
- Number built: 8 by early 1977

History
- First flight: 20 May 1974
- Developed from: Scheibe SF-27A Zugvogel

The Scheibe SF-30 Club-Spatz (English: Club-Sparrow) is a 15 m class single seat sailplane built in Germany in the 1970s and intended for club use.

== Design and development ==
Design work on the Club-Spatz began in 1973. With a 15 m (49 ft 3 in) span, it was intended to suit gliding clubs and inexperienced pilots, strong and easy to fly and maintain. It is of mixed construction, using a combination of steel tubes with fabric glassfibre covering in the fuselage and with a wooden structured, plywood and glassfibre skinned wing. Despite its name, the Club-Spatz was unrelated to the earlier L-Spatz but developed from the Scheibe SF-27A Zugvogel-V.

It is a shoulder wing cantilever monoplane, its wing built around a single wooden spar. Its Wortmann airfoil tapers in thickness/chord ratio from 18% at the root to 12% at the tip. The wing is also tapered in plan, with square tips; its leading edge is glassfibre/foam composite covered, with plywood over the remainder of the wing surface. There are all wood, spring trimmed ailerons and upper surface Schempp-Hirth airbrakes.

The fuselage of the Club-Spatz used Scheibe's traditional steel tube construction, glassfibre skinned over the nose and tail and fabric covered between. The cockpit, ahead of the wing, is covered by a long, one piece, side hinged Plexiglas canopy which smoothly blends the nose contours into those of the fuselage behind and terminates at the wing leading edge. Its fuselage tapers to a conventional tail; the rear surfaces are wooden structured and ply skinned. A straight edged tailplane is mounted on top of the fuselage, carrying damped elevators fitted with adjustable spring trimming like the ailerons. Fin and rudder together are straight tapered and square topped, with the latter reaching down to the keel. The Club-Spatz lands on a fixed, unsprung monowheel, fitted with a brake and assisted by a tailwheel.

The Club-Spatz flew for the first time on 20 May 1974. At least eight were built, two of which remained on the German civil aircraft register in 2010.

== Specifications ==
Data from Jane's All the World's Aircraft 1976/77 pp.565-6

General characteristics

- Crew: One
- Length: 6.10 m (20 ft 0 in)
- Wingspan: 15.00 m (49 ft 3 in)
- Wing area: 9.30 m^{2} (100.1 sq ft)
- Aspect ratio: 24
- Empty weight: 185 kg (408 lb)
- Max takeoff weight: 295 kg (650 lb)

Performance

- Maximum speed: 210 km/h (130 mph, 110 kn) smooth air
- Stall speed: 65 km/h (40 mph, 35 kn)
- g limits: +8.0/-4.0
- Maximum glide ratio: best 36:1 at 90 km/h (56 mph; 49 kn)
- Rate of sink: 0.59 m/s (116 ft/min) minimum, at 75 km/h (47 mph; 40 kn)
- Wing loading: 30 kg/m^{2} (6.1 lb/sq ft)
