= Scheibe Zugvogel =

German single-seat glider, 1954

Zugvogel
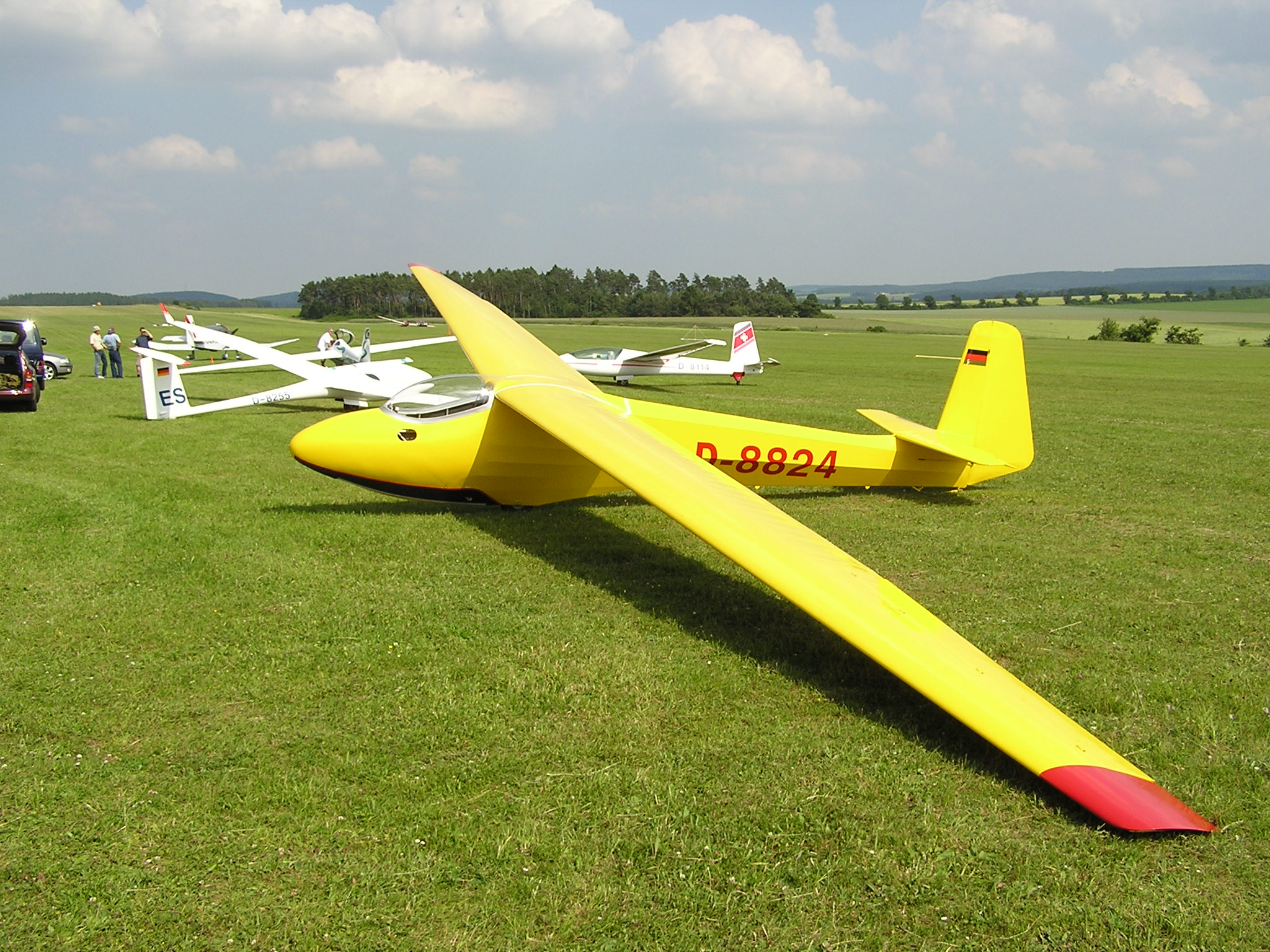
- Zugvogel IIIA

General information
- Type: Glider
- National origin: West Germany
- Manufacturer: Scheibe Flugzeugbau
- Designer: Rudolf Kaiser; Egon Scheibe
- Status: Production completed
- Number built: 100

History
- First flight: 1954
- Variant: Scheibe SF-27 Zugvogel V

The Scheibe Zugvogel (English: Migratory bird) is a West German, high-wing, single-seat, FAI Open Class glider that was produced by Scheibe Flugzeugbau. The first version was designed by Rudolph Kaiser and subsequent versions by Egon Scheibe.

== Design and development ==
The Zugvogel was designed with the goal of a simple and inexpensive, but high performance, open class competition glider, with quick assembly. It was developed through several variants before production ended after 100 had been completed.

The aircraft is of mixed construction, with a welded steel tube fuselage covered in doped aircraft fabric covering, wooden framed tail surfaces covered in fabric and wooden wings. The 17.0 m (55.8 ft) span wing uses a NACA 63-616 airfoil at the wing root, changing to a NACA 63-614 section at the wing tip. The wing uses dive brakes for glidepath control. The nose is covered with fibreglass. The landing gear is a fixed monowheel.

The Zugvogel IIIB was type certified in the United States on 6 May 1964. Zugvogel IIIAs operated in the US are in the Experimental - Racing/Exhibition category.

== Operational history ==
US glider pilot Helen Dick set a number of US national feminine single-place records in her Zugvogel IIIB between 1964 and 1967. These included a distance of 492.2 km (305.8 mi), distance to goal of 364.6 km (226.6 mi) and an out and return distance of 400.0 km (248.5 mi).

In July 2011 there were three Zugvogel IIIAs and two IIIBs registered with the US Federal Aviation Administration and two Zugvogel IIIAs and four IIIBs registered with the British Civil Aviation Authority.

== Variants ==
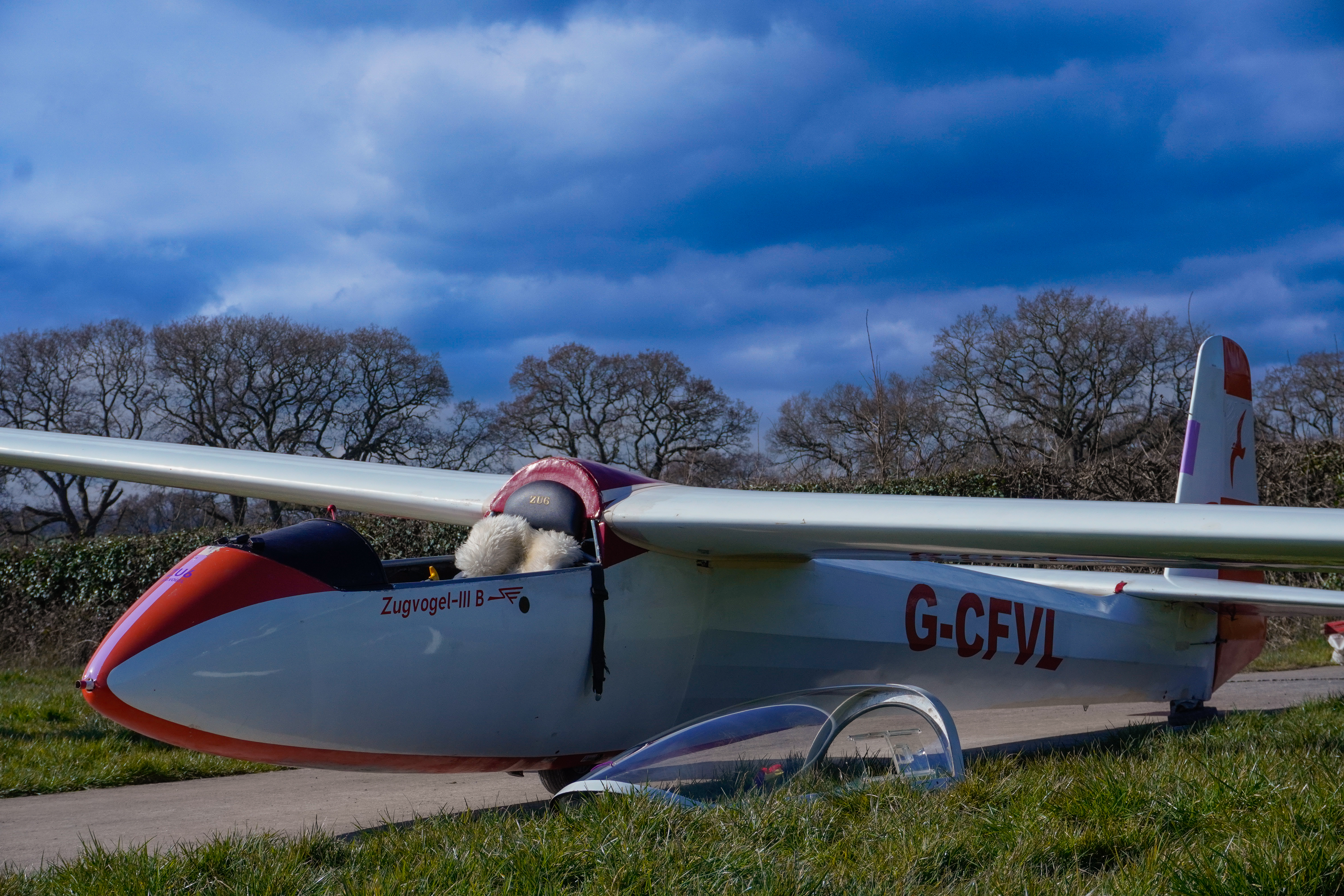
A Zugvogel IIIB waiting to launch

Zugvogel I
Initial version
Zugvogel II
Improved version
Zugvogel III
Improved version
Zugvogel IIIA
17.0 m (55.8 ft) wingspan, 37.8:1 glide ratio.
Zugvogel IIIB
Similar to the IIIA, but with a shallower fuselage.
Zugvogel IV
Zugvogel IVA
Scheibe SF-27 Zugvogel V

FAI Standard Class development
Loravia LCA-10 Topaze
Loravia LCA-11 Topaze

== Aircraft on display ==
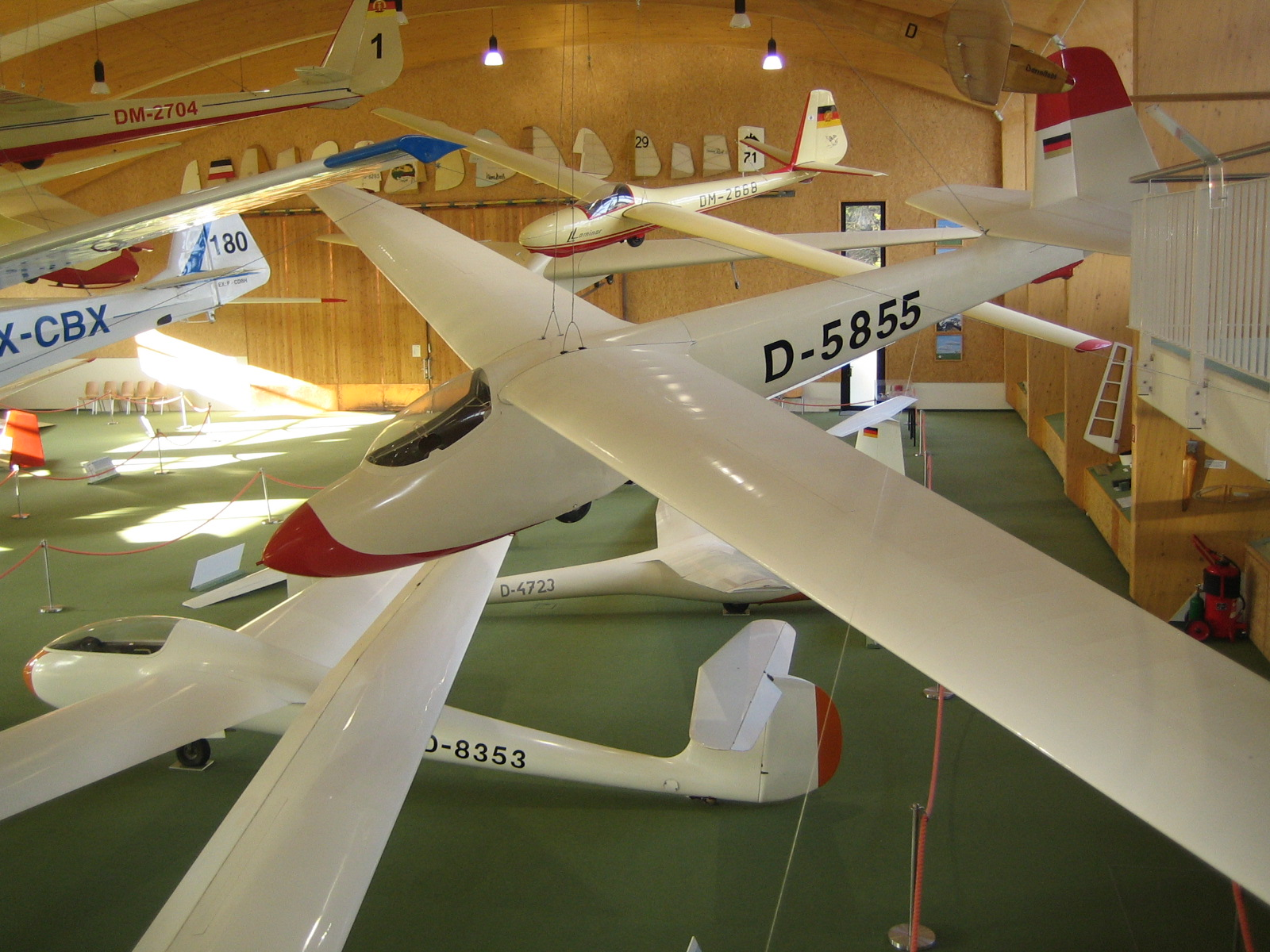
Scheibe Zugvogel III in the Deutsches Segelflugmuseum.

- Deutsches Segelflugmuseum

== Specifications (Zugvogel IIIA) ==
Data from Sailplane Directory, Soaring and Type Certificate G4eu

General characteristics

- Crew: one
- Length: 7.1 m (23 ft 4 in)
- Wingspan: 17.0 m (55 ft 9 in)
- Wing area: 14.48 m^{2} (155.9 sq ft)
- Aspect ratio: 20:1
- Airfoil: root: NACA 63_{2}616, mid: NACA 63_{2}615, tip: NACA 63_{2}614
- Empty weight: 243 kg (536 lb)
- Max takeoff weight: 365 kg (805 lb)

Performance

- Stall speed: 58 km/h (36 mph, 31 kn)
- Never exceed speed: 200 km/h (120 mph, 110 kn)
- Rough air speed max: 140 km/h (87 mph; 76 kn)
- Aerotow speed: 140 km/h (87 mph; 76 kn)
- Winch launch max speed: 100 km/h (62 mph; 54 kn)
- Terminal velocity: with full airbrakes 210 km/h (130 mph; 110 kn)
- g limits: +4 -2
- Maximum glide ratio: 35 at 80 km/h (50 mph; 43 kn)
- Rate of sink: 0.58 m/s (114 ft/min) at 67 km/h (42 mph; 36 kn)
- Wing loading: 25.2 kg/m^{2} (5.2 lb/sq ft)

== See also ==
Related lists

- List of gliders
