= Scheibe SF-24 Motorspatz =

German motor glider, 1960

SF-24 Motorspatz
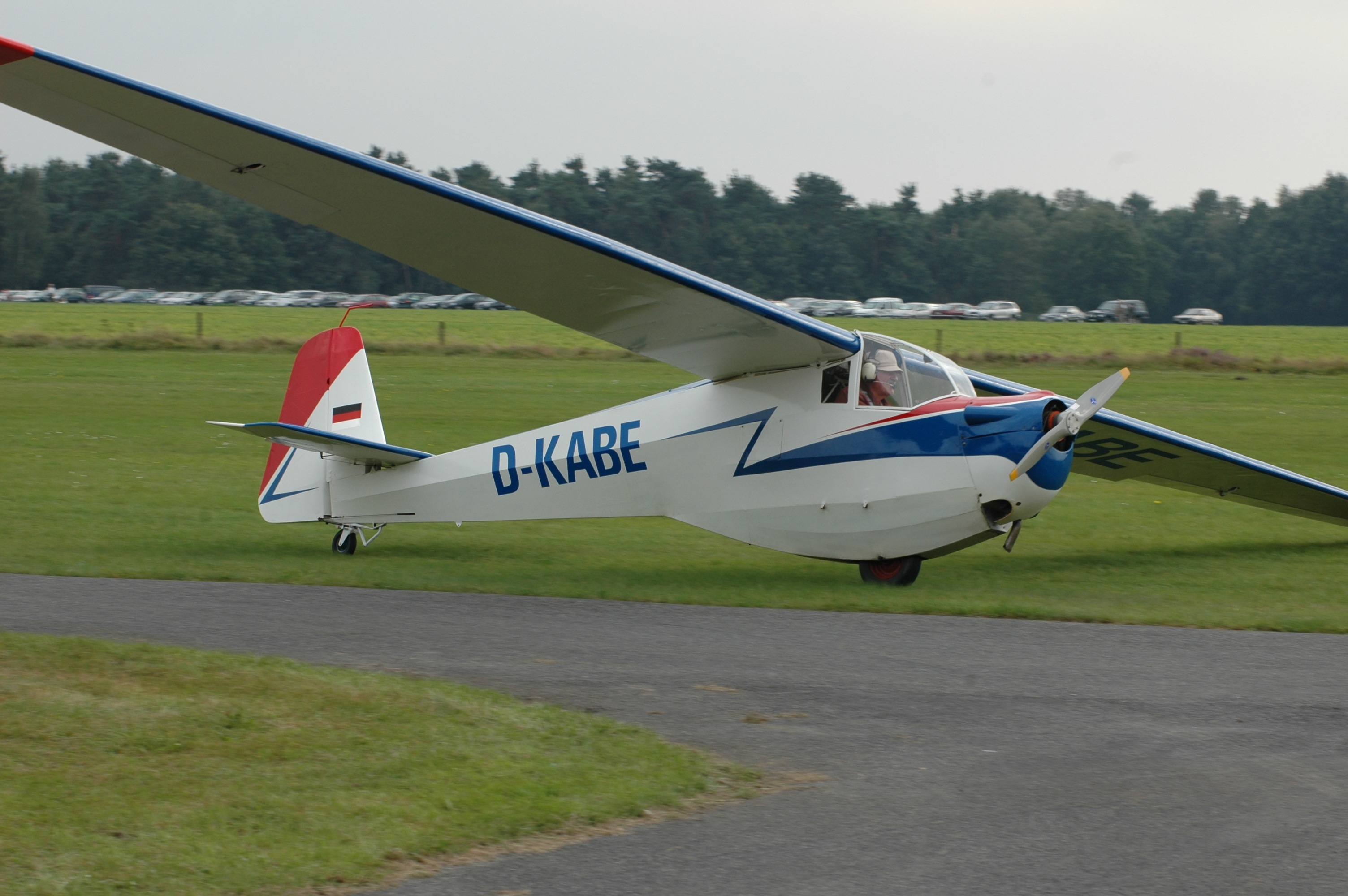

General information
- Type: Motor glider
- National origin: West Germany
- Manufacturer: Scheibe Flugzeugbau
- Designer: Egon Scheibe
- Status: Production completed
- Number built: 50

History
- Introduction date: 1960
- First flight: 1960
- Developed from: Scheibe Spatz

The Scheibe SF-24 Motorspatz (English: Motor Sparrow) is a West German high-wing, single-seat motor glider that was designed by Egon Scheibe and produced by Scheibe Flugzeugbau.

Derived from the unpowered Scheibe Spatz, the Motor Spatz was described in 1983 by Soaring Magazine as "one of the more primitive of the breed of self-launching sailplanes".

== Design and development ==
The Motorspatz was an early attempt to create a self-launching glider. Scheibe accomplished this by mounting a Hirth engine in the nose of a mostly stock Spatz glider.

The SF-24 is constructed with a welded steel tube fuselage that mounts the monowheel landing gear, with a small tail wheel for ground maneuvering. The wings and tail surfaces are built with wooden structures and covered in doped aircraft fabric covering. The wing has a 14.0 m (46 ft) span, employs an Mu 14% airfoil and mounts spoilers for glidepath control.

The aircraft was not type certified and 50 were built.

== Operational history ==
In July 2011 there were two Motorspatz registered in the United States with the Federal Aviation Administration, including one SF-24 in the Experimental - Exhibition category and one SF-24B in the Experimental - Research and Development category.

== Variants ==
SF-24
Initial version
SF-24A
Improved version
SF-24B
Improved version

== Specifications (SF-24) ==
Data from Sailplane Directory and Soaring

General characteristics

- Crew: one
- Wingspan: 14 m (45 ft 11 in)
- Wing area: 11.87 m^{2} (127.8 sq ft)
- Airfoil: Mu 14%
- Empty weight: 225 kg (496 lb)
- Gross weight: 345 kg (761 lb)
- Powerplant: 1 × Hirth

Performance

- Rate of sink: 1.0 m/s (200 ft/min) at 80 km/h (50 mph)
- Wing loading: 29.21 kg/m^{2} (5.98 lb/sq ft)

== See also ==
- List of gliders
