= Scheibe SF-33 =

German motor glider, 1977

SF 33

General information
- Type: Motorglider
- National origin: Germany
- Manufacturer: Scheibe
- Designer: Egon Scheibe
- Number built: 1

History
- First flight: 1977

The Scheibe SF 33 (German: "hawk") is a German motorglider that was designed by Egon Scheibe in the 1970s.

== Specifications ==
General characteristics

- Crew: 1
- Length: 6.75 m (22 ft 2 in)
- Wingspan: 15 m (49 ft 3 in)
- Wing area: 29.2 m^{2} (314 sq ft)
- Aspect ratio: 28
- Empty weight: 300 kg (661 lb)
- Max takeoff weight: 410 kg (904 lb)
- Powerplant: 1 × BMW 2-cyl. air-cooled horizontally-opposed piston engine, 25 kW (34 hp)

Performance

- Maximum speed: 150 km/h (93 mph, 81 kn)
- Cruise speed: 170 km/h (110 mph, 92 kn)
- Maximum glide ratio: 28:1
- Rate of climb: 2.3 m/s (450 ft/min)
- Rate of sink: 0.8 m/s (160 ft/min) at 70 km/h (38 kn; 43 mph)
- Wing loading: 32.99 kg/m^{2} (6.76 lb/sq ft)
