= Scheibe Falke =

German touring motor glider, 1963

SF-25 Falke
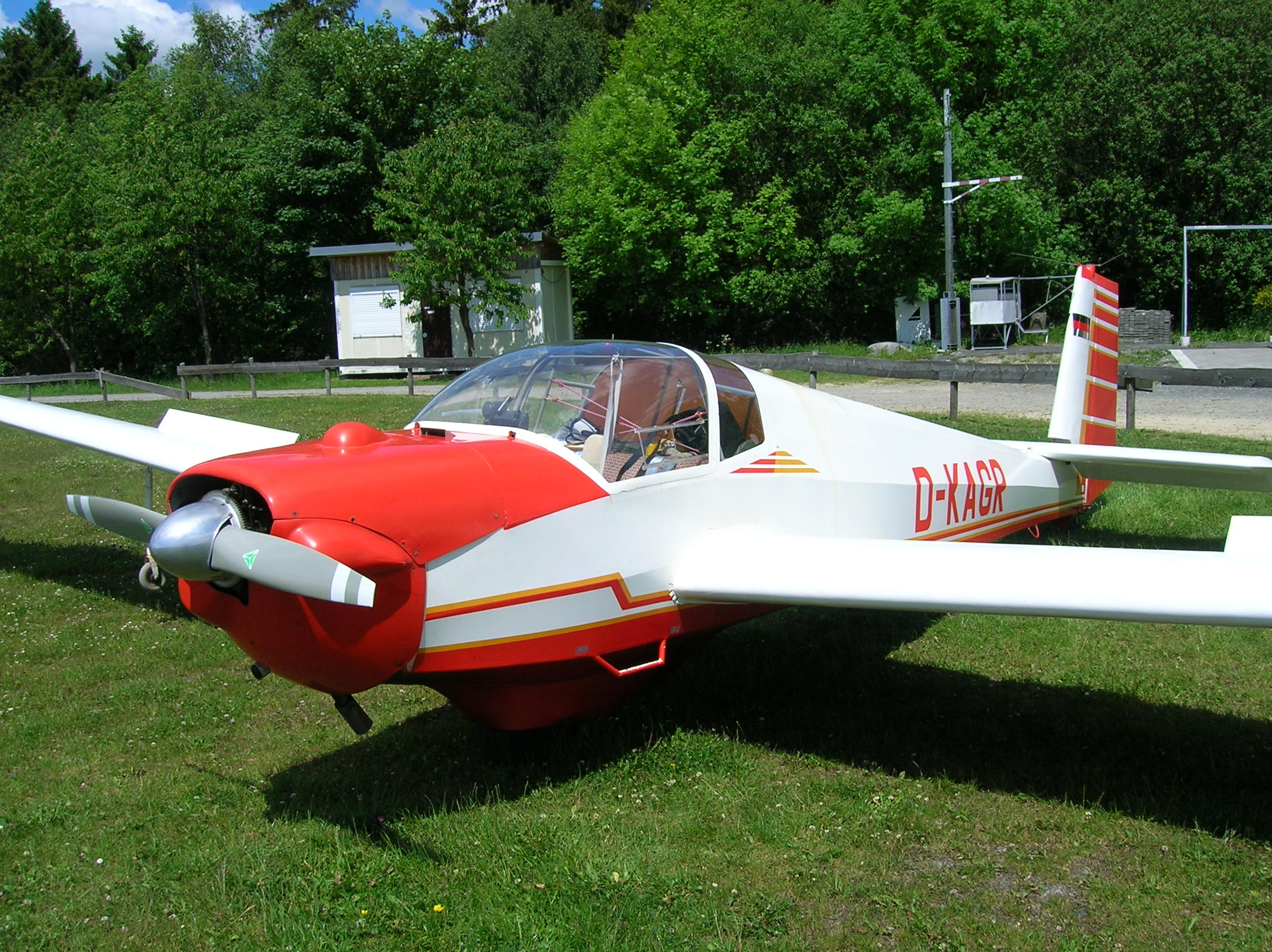
- Scheibe SF 25 B at Schmallenberg-Rennefeld

General information
- Type: Motor Glider
- National origin: West Germany
- Manufacturer: Scheibe Aircraft GmbH
- Number built: 1,200+ by October 1998

History
- First flight: 1963
- Developed from: Scheibe Bergfalke

The Scheibe SF-25 Falke (English: Falcon) is a German touring motor glider developed from the earlier Bergfalke glider by Scheibe Flugzeugbau. Since May 2006 the business has been run by Scheibe Aircraft GmbH.

== Development ==
The company had produced the Motor Spatz but decided to produce a better light aircraft based on the Bergfalke glider. It had a new forward fuselage with an enclosed cockpit with two side-by-side seats and originally a Hirth F10A2a engine in the nose. It first flew in May 1963 as the SF-25A Motor Falke. After an initial batch of aircraft the wing was lowered and it was renamed as just the SF-25B Falke. A number of variants were built with various engines and the type was licence built by Sportavia-Putzer, Aeronautica Umbra (Italy), Loravia (France) and Slingsby (United Kingdom). The current model is the SF 25C. It is currently available with a choice of three engines: the Rotax 912 80 hp, the Rotax 912S (100 hp) and the Rotax 914F3 (115 hp).

== Variants ==
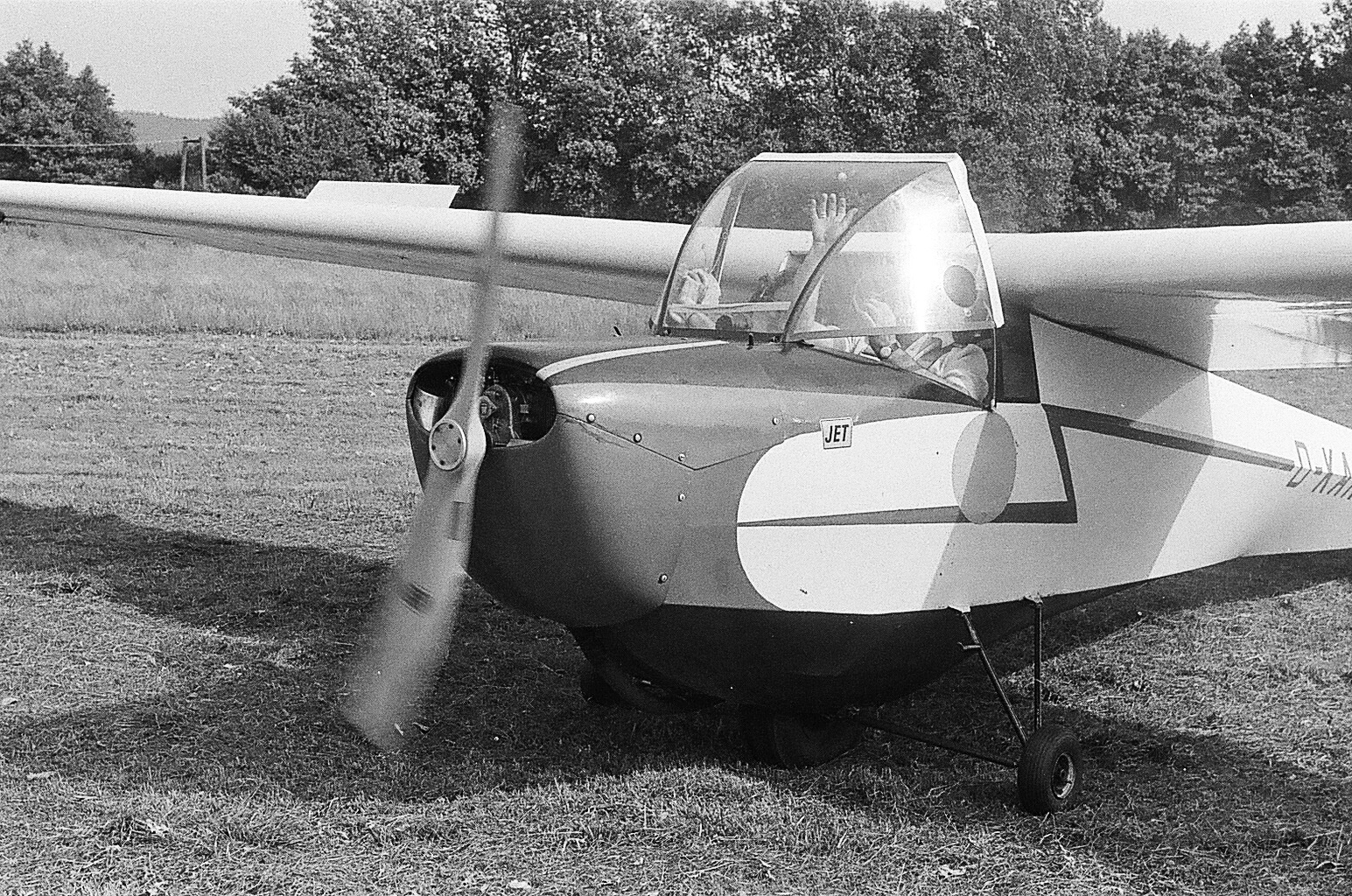
Scheibe SF 25 A at Anspach airfield; note the shoulder wing configuration and outrigger wheels

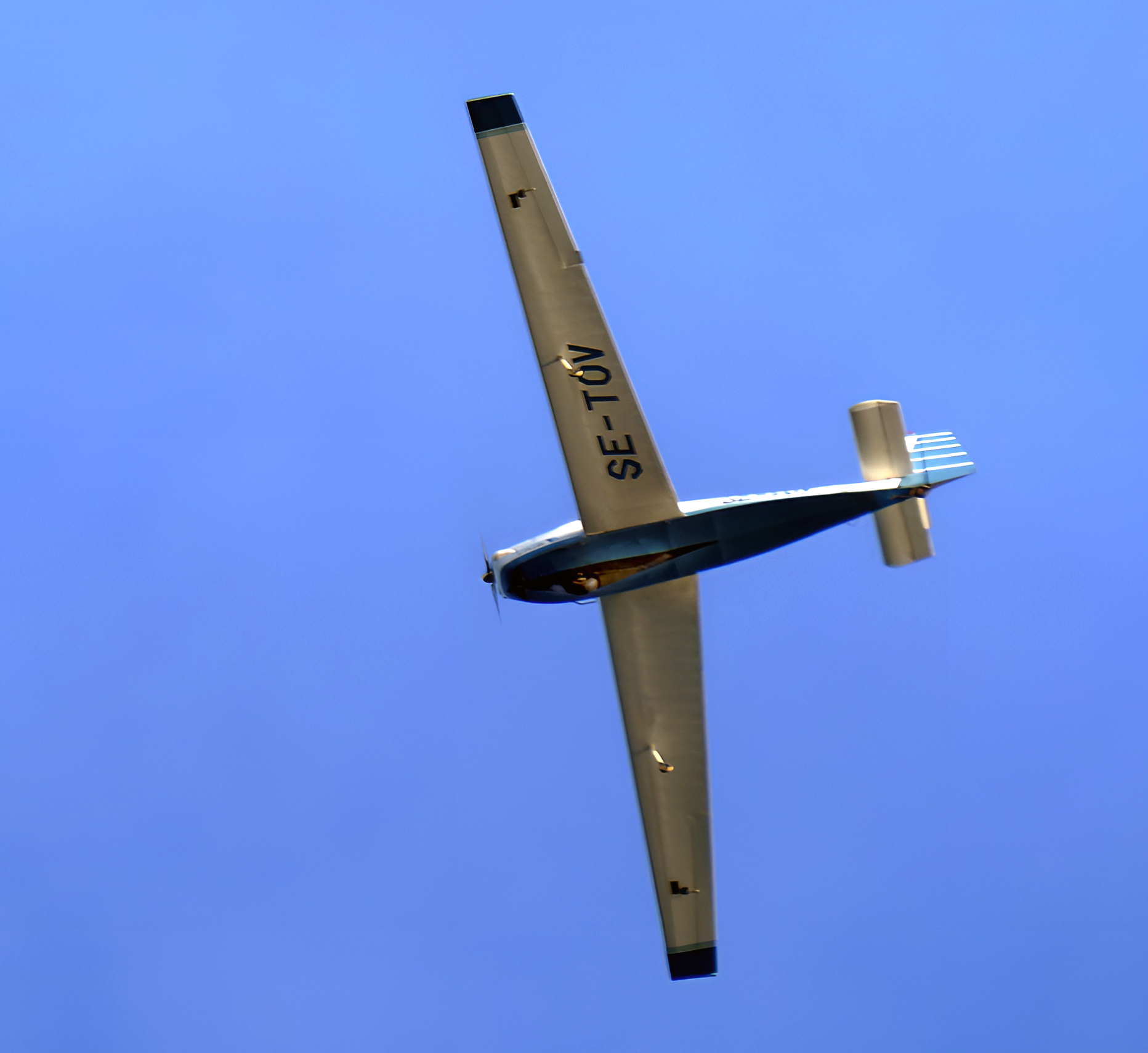
SF25 Motorfalke over Ystad 2022.

SF-25A Motor Falke
First production batch with a Hirth F10A2a engine, 56 built.
SF-25B Falke
Improved variant with lower wing position and a 45hp Stark Stamo engine, 372 built.
SF-25C Falke
Same as a SF-25B but with an alternator and electric starter. Sub-variants include:

Falke 1700

49 kW (65 hp) Limbach 1700 EA 1 IA, driving propeller at 3,450 rpm;

Falke 2000

60 kW (80 hp) Limbach 2000 EA, driving propeller at 3,450 rpm (about 512 Limbach powered Falkes built by 1998);

Rotax Falke

(a) 60 kW (80 hp) Rotax 912 A running at 5,800 rpm and geared down to 2,500 rpm propeller speed; tricycle gear an option (about 130 Rotax powered Falkes built by 1998), or
(b) 75 kW (100 hp) Rotax 912S at 5,800 rpm and geared down to 2,500 rpm propeller speed, or
(c) 85 kW (115 hp) Rotax 914F3 at 5,800 rpm and geared down to 2,500 rpm propeller speed with 5 minute time limit; 75 kW (100 hp) continuous.

Falke 100PS

Glider tug.

SF-25CS Falke

A SF-25C with a feathering propeller; feathering was an option with the Falke 1700, 2000, and Rotax Falke.

SF-25D Falke
SF-25B converted with a Limbach 1700A engine.
SF-25E Super Falke
A SF-25CS with extended wing, a narrow-chord vertical tail. air brakes and a raised bubble canopy, first flown in 1974.
SF-25K K-Falke
A SF-25C with folding wings and large canopy.
Slinsgby T61 Falke/Slingsby Venture
Licence built variant of the SF-25B, 76 built

== Operators ==
Oman

- Royal Air Force of Oman

== Specifications (Rotax Falke) ==
Data from

General characteristics

- Crew: 2
- Length: 7.60 m (24 ft 11 in)
- Wingspan: 15.30 m (50 ft 2 in)
- Height: 1.68 m (5 ft 6 in) tailwheel undercarriage
- Wing area: 18.20 m^{2} (195.9 sq ft)
- Aspect ratio: 13.8
- Empty weight: 435 kg (959 lb)
- Max takeoff weight: 650 kg (1,433 lb)
- Fuel capacity: 55 L (14.5 UG gal, 12.0 Imp gal) standard
- Powerplant: 1 × Rotax 912 A flat-4, air-cooled with water-cooled cylinder heads, 48 kW (65 hp)
- Propellers: 2-bladed

Performance

- Maximum speed: 190 km/h (120 mph, 100 kn)
- Cruise speed: 180 km/h (110 mph, 97 kn) maximum
- Stall speed: 65 km/h (40 mph, 35 kn)
- Range: 700 km (430 mi, 380 nmi)
- Service ceiling: 4,580 m (15,030 ft) (more than)
- Maximum glide ratio: 23-24
- Rate of sink: 1.0 m/s (200 ft/min) minimum

Byron Bay gliding club (Australia) have re-engined using a Jabiru 2200. "We get a sound 500 ft/min climb rate measured with a logger and this aircraft will take an honest 190kg pay load with 1 hour of fuel"
