= Scheibe SF-26 Super Spatz =

German single-seat glider, 1961

SF 26 Super Spatz

General information
- Type: Sailplane
- National origin: Germany
- Manufacturer: Scheibe
- Designer: Egon Scheibe
- Number built: 40

History
- First flight: 1961

The Scheibe SF 26 Super Spatz is a German sailplane that was designed by Egon Scheibe in the 1960s.

== Design ==
The SF 26 Super Spatz featured 3-piece wood wing, a tail made of wood and fabric, and a steel-tube/fabric fuselage with a fiberglass nose.

== Specifications ==
Data from

General characteristics

- Crew: 1
- Length: 6.7 m (22 ft 0 in)
- Wingspan: 15.0 m (49 ft 3 in)
- Wing area: 12.3 m^{2} (132 sq ft)
- Aspect ratio: 18.2
- Airfoil: NACA 63(215)-616/614
- Empty weight: 190 kg (419 lb)
- Max takeoff weight: 310 kg (683 lb)

Performance

- Maximum speed: 200 km/h (120 mph, 110 kn)
- Rate of sink: 0.67 m/s (132 ft/min) at 89 km/h (48 kn; 55 mph)
- Wing loading: 25.2 kg/m^{2} (5.2 lb/sq ft)
