= Museum für Luftfahrt und Technik =

Coordinates: 51.8396°N 10.7728°E

Luftfahrt Museum Wernigerode
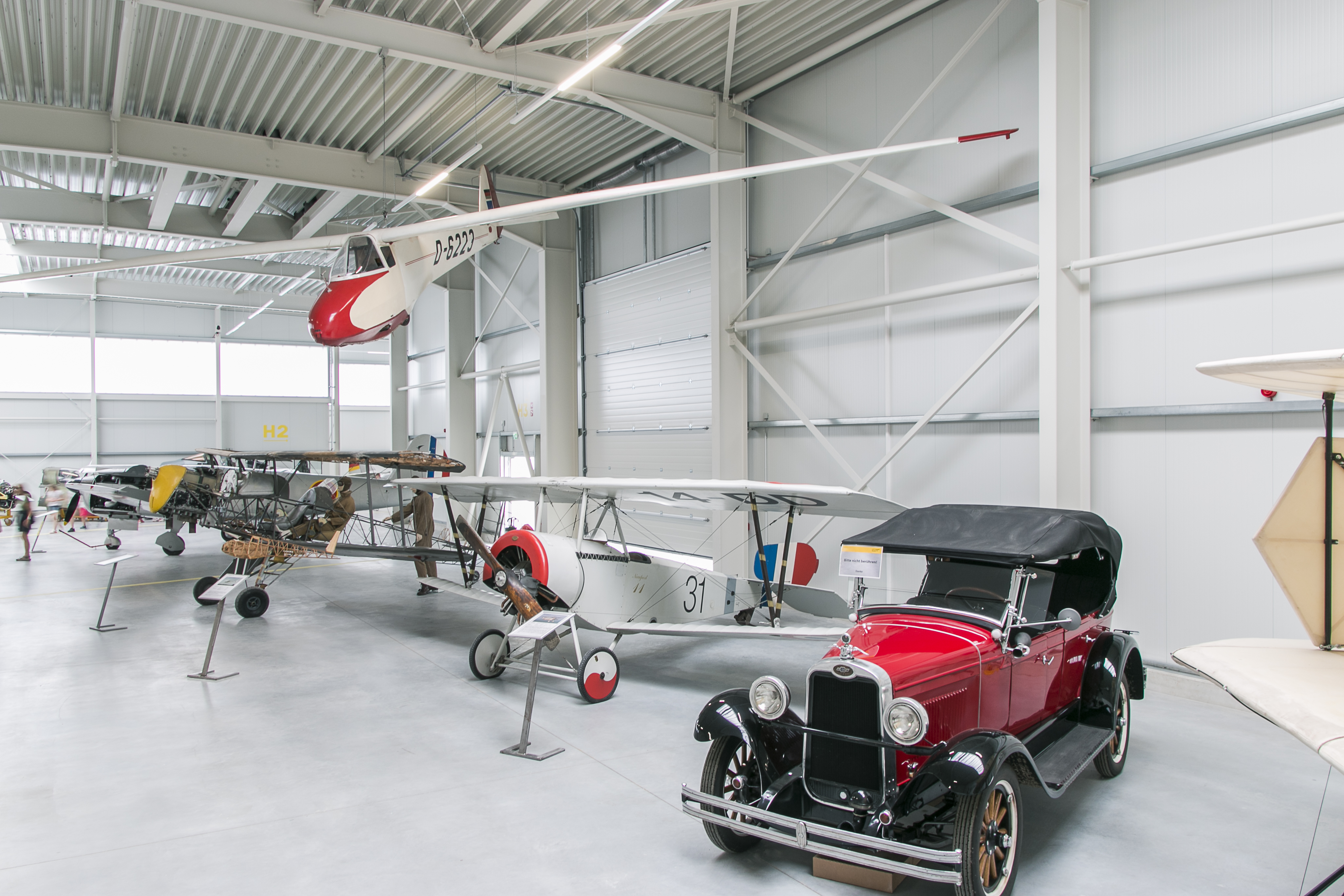
- Hangar 1
- Established: 1999
- Location: Wernigerode, Saxony-Anhalt
- Type: Aviation museum
- Founder: Clemens Aulich
- Website: http://www.luftfahrtmuseum-wernigerode.de/

The Museum für Luftfahrt und Technik Wernigerode is an aviation museum located in the German town of Wernigerode near Halberstadt. Many aerospace exhibits are on display including fixed-wing aircraft, helicopters and aircraft engines. The main display is contained within two buildings with some aircraft displayed externally. In addition to the aircraft exhibits a number of cockpit sections and a collection of ejection seats are also held by the museum.

== History ==
The museum opened to the public on 1 June 1999. In 2016, the museum opened two new buildings with a total of 2,100 square meters.

== Aircraft on display ==
The museum has over 45 aircraft on display and over 1,000 exhibit items.

=== Piston engine aircraft ===
- Antonov An-2R 1G 194-27
- Dornier Do 27B-1 56+18
- Dornier Do 28D-1 4033
- LET Aero 45S 04-013
- Nord 1101 81
- Piaggio P.149
- Zlín Z-37A 1920

=== Turboprop aircraft ===
- Transall C-160 51+01

=== Jet aircraft ===
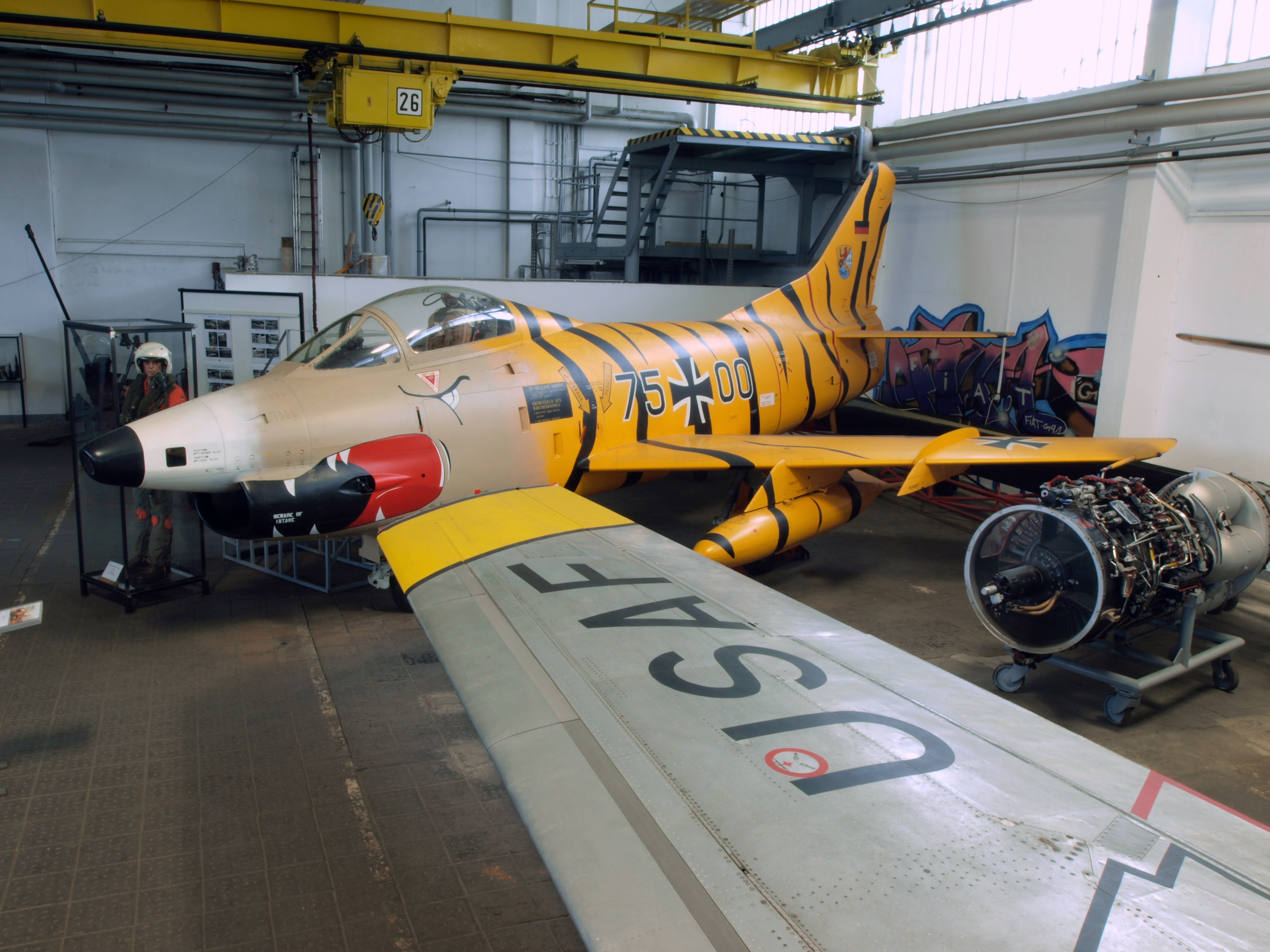
One of several Fiat G.91 aircraft on display

- BAC Jet Provost T4 XS217
- Canadair Sabre JB-112
- Dassault Mirage IIIRS 17-26-145
- de Havilland Venom J-1635
- Fiat G.91 BD+248
- Hawker Hunter F.4 WV276
- Lockheed T-33A 95+20
- Lockheed F-104G Starfighter 20+07
- Lockheed F-104G Starfighter 22+45
- Lockheed F-104G Starfighter 23+09
- Mikoyan-Gurevich MiG-21 SPS 22+22
- Mikoyan-Gurevich MiG-23 MF 20+06

=== Gliders ===
- Scheibe L-Spatz

=== Helicopters ===
- Aerospatiale Alouette II
- Aerospatiale Alouette III
- Bell UH-1D
- Hughes 269
- MBB Bo 105CB 139
- Mil Mi-2 543620074
- Westland Whirlwind HAR.10 XP339

== Aircraft engines ==
=== Piston engines ===
- Avia M462
- Shvetsov ASh-82
- Wright R-1300

=== Gas turbine engines ===
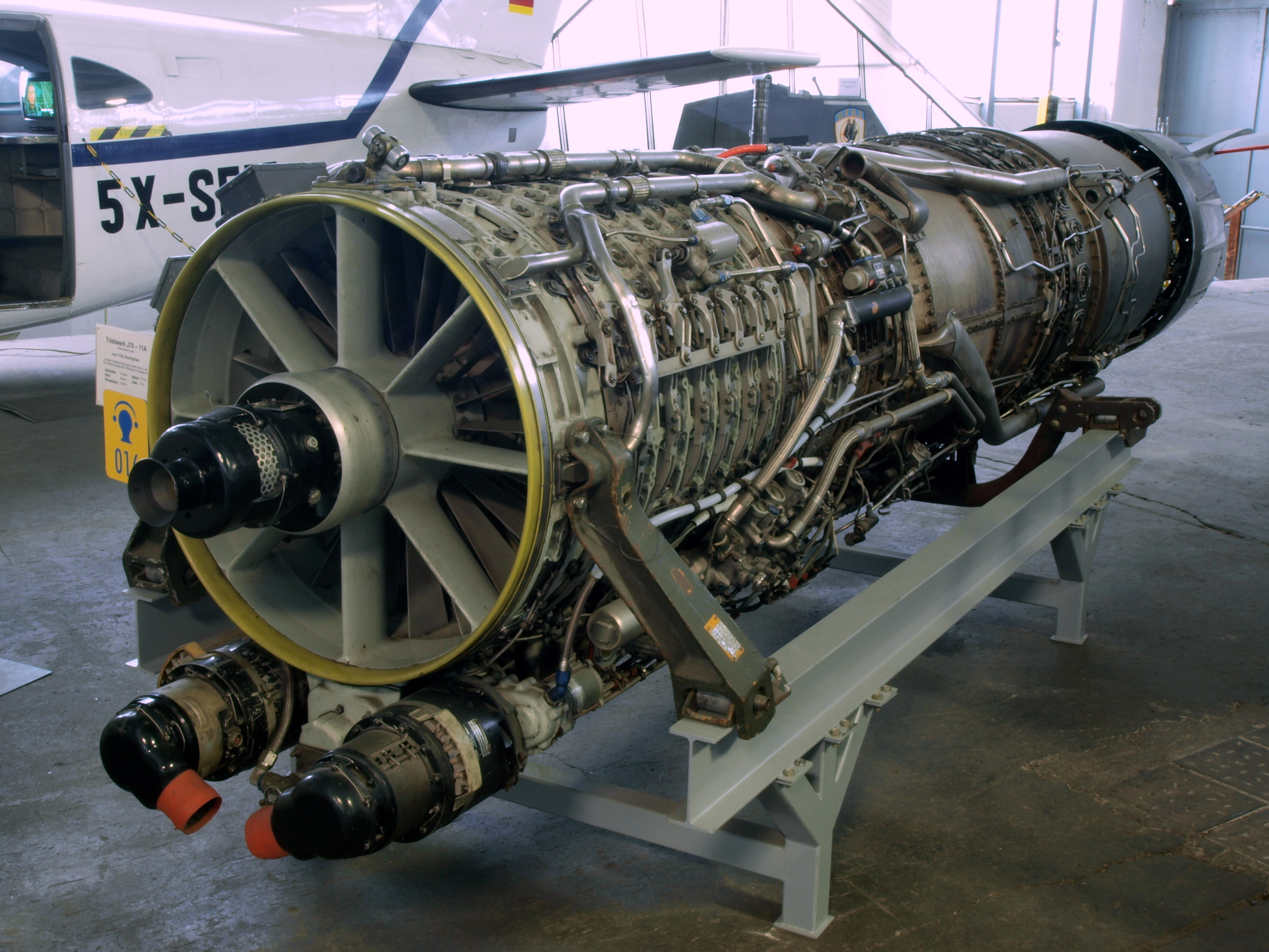
Preserved General Electric J79 on display

- Allison J33
- Bristol Siddeley Orpheus
- General Electric J79
- Klimov GTD-350
- Rolls-Royce Avon
- Rolls-Royce Tyne
- SNECMA Atar
- Turbomeca Marboré

== See also ==
- List of aerospace museums
