= Spatz (surname) =

Spatz is a German surname meaning "sparrow", most commonly from the nickname referring to a small or nimble person. Notable people with the surname include:

- Cathy Spatz Widom, American psychologist
- Frances Spatz Leighton, American author, ghostwriter, and journalist
- Gary Spatz (born 1951), American acting coach
- Gregory Spatz (born 1964), American author and musician
- Hugo Spatz (1888–1969), German neuropathologist
- Jim Spatz, Canadian property developer
- Susan Cernyak-Spatz, Austrian-born professor of German language and literature
- Tammie Spatz, American swimmer
- Willy Spatz, German painter and lithographer

== See also ==
- Spaatz (disambiguation)
