= Scheibe SF-23 Sperling =

Two-seat German light aircraft, 1955

SF-23 Sperling
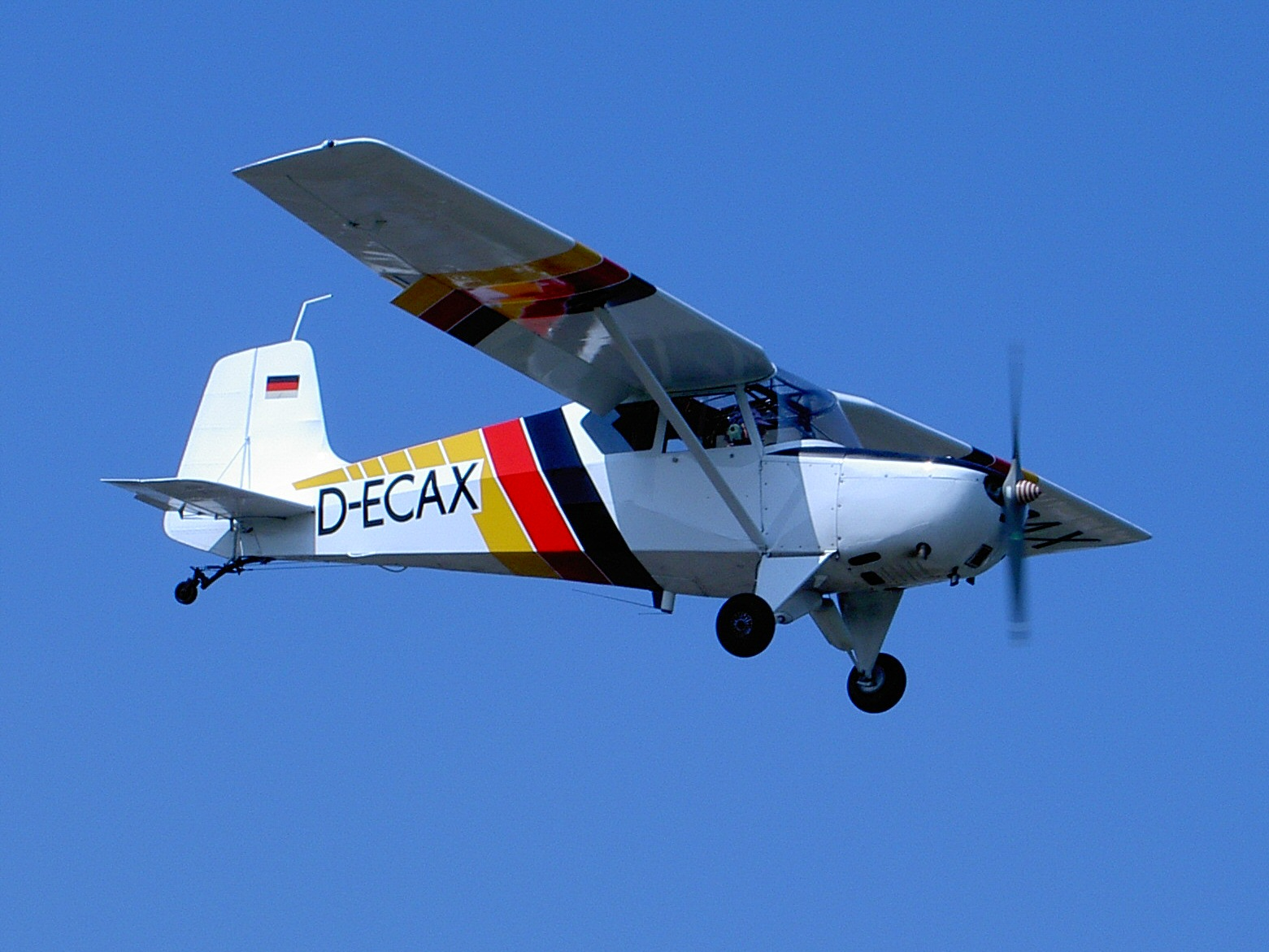
- SF-23A

General information
- Type: Two-seat cabin monoplane
- National origin: Germany
- Manufacturer: Scheibe Flugzeugbau
- Number built: 27

History
- First flight: 1955

The Scheibe SF-23 Sperling (en:Sparrow) is a 1950s German two-seat cabin monoplane.

== Development ==
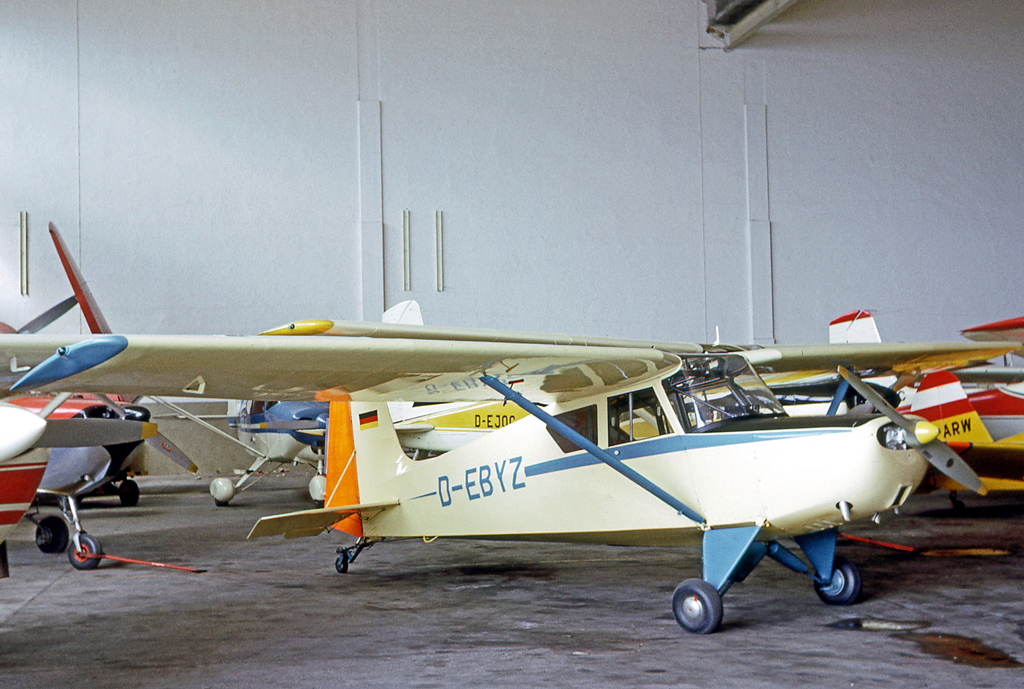
Early production SF-23A Sperling in 1965

The Sperling was the first design of powered aircraft to come from the Scheibe Flugzeugbau company which had started building gliders in 1951. The prototype first flew on 8 August 1955 and the initial production SF-23A aircraft first flew in September 1958.

The Sperling is a high-wing braced monoplane with side-by-side seating for two in an enclosed cabin. It had a fixed tailwheel landing gear and was initially powered by a 95 hp (71 kW) Continental C90 piston engine. The Sperling utilizes mixed construction, the fuselage being a fabric-covered steel-tube structure and the wings being single-spar wooden structures with fabric and plywood covering. Production of the Sperling was completed in 1963.

== Operation ==
Most aircraft produced were sold to German private pilots and flying clubs but one was purchased by a British owner. The higher powered versions were suitable for use in glider-towing. By 2009, seven examples remained in active operation in Germany.

== Variants ==
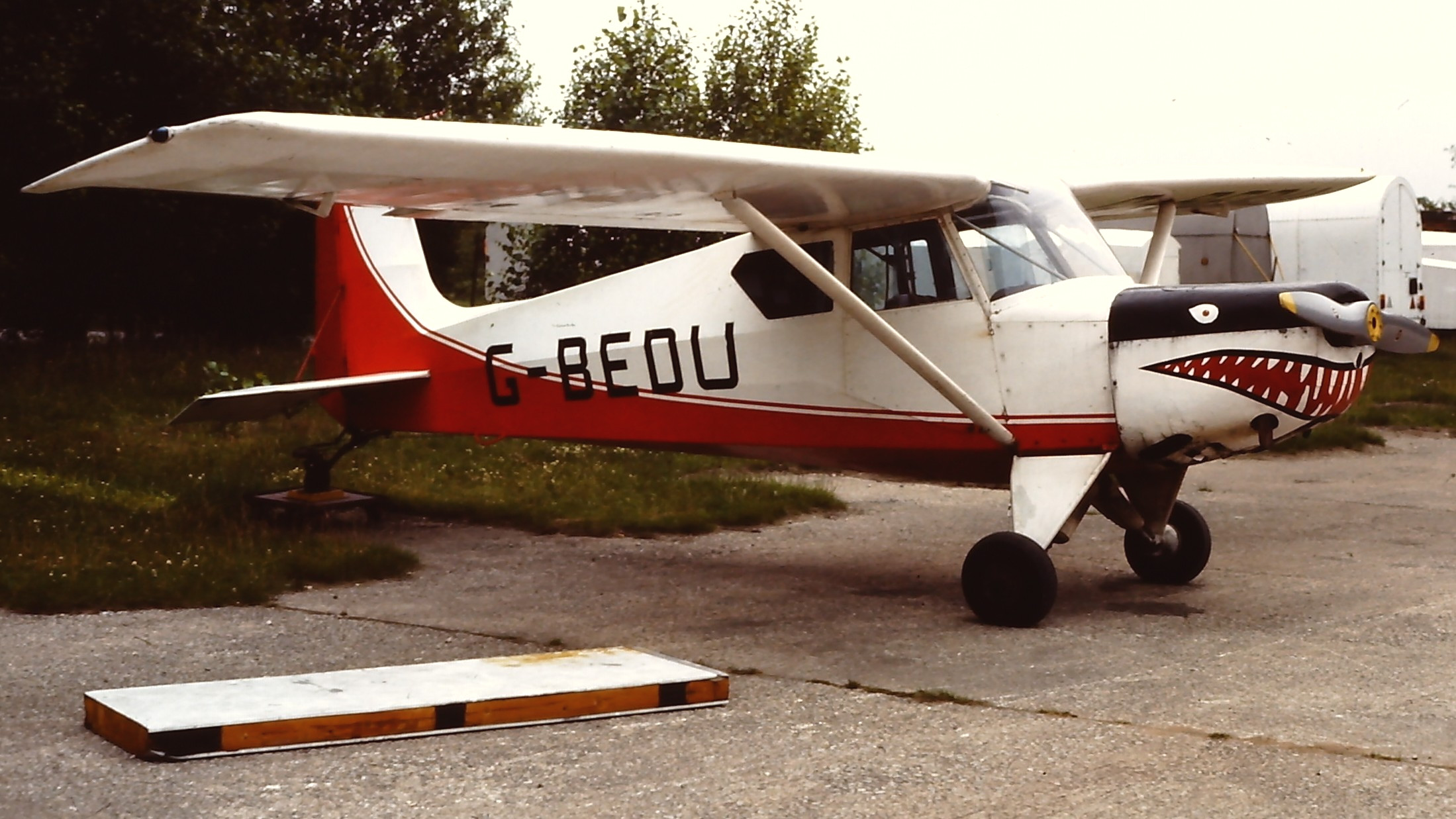
SF-23C

SF-23A
Production variant with a 95 hp (71 kW) Continental C90-12F engine, 17 built.
SF-23B
Production variant with a 100 hp (75 kW) Continental O-200-B engine, four built.
SF-23C
Production variant with a 115 hp (86 kW) Lycoming O-235 engine, six built.

== Specifications (SF-23A) ==
Data from Jane's All The World's Aircraft 1961–62

General characteristics

- Crew: 2
- Length: 6.20 m (20 ft 4 in)
- Wingspan: 9.87 m (32 ft 5 in)
- Height: 2.18 m (7 ft 2 in)
- Wing area: 12.16 m^{2} (130.9 sq ft)
- Aspect ratio: 8:1
- Airfoil: NACA 23012
- Empty weight: 460 kg (1,014 lb)
- Gross weight: 730 kg (1,609 lb)
- Fuel capacity: 78 L (21 US gal; 17 imp gal)
- Powerplant: 1 × Continental C90-12F flat-four piston engine, 71 kW (95 hp)

Performance

- Maximum speed: 200 km/h (120 mph, 110 kn)
- Cruise speed: 160 km/h (99 mph, 86 kn) (60% power)
- Never exceed speed: 250 km/h (160 mph, 130 kn)
- Range: 640 km (400 mi, 350 nmi)
- Endurance: 4 hr
- Service ceiling: 5,000 m (16,000 ft)
- Rate of climb: 3.5 m/s (690 ft/min)
