= Scheibe SF 34 =

German two-seat glider, 1978

SF 34 Delphin
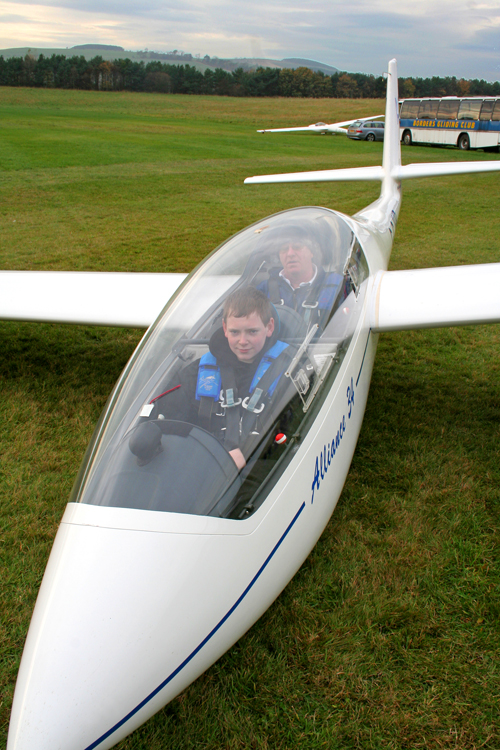
- Centrair SNC-34 Alliance

General information
- Type: Sailplane
- National origin: Germany
- Manufacturer: Scheibe
- Designer: Wolf Hoffmann
- Number built: 26 by 1987

History
- First flight: 28 October 1978

The Scheibe SF 34 Delphin (German: "dolphin") is a two-seat sailplane that was produced by Scheibe in Germany in the late 1970s and 1980s. Designed by Wolf Hoffmann and originally designated the SF H34, it was Scheibe's first unpowered aircraft of composite construction.

The SF 34 is a conventional, mid-wing, cantilever monoplane. The landing gear is of bicycle configuration, with a non-retractable nosewheel and mainwheel semi-recessed into the fuselage. The tail is also equipped with a small skid. Scheibe manufactured the type in Hungary (SF-34b), later it was produced under license in France by Centrair as the Centrair SNC-34 Alliance. In 2010, Scheibe Aircraft in Heubach intended to take up production of the SF-34 again.

== Specifications ==
Data from Jane's All the World's Aircraft 1988-89

General characteristics

- Crew: 2
- Length: 7.5 m (24 ft 7 in)
- Wingspan: 15.8 m (51 ft 10 in)
- Height: 1.4 m (4 ft 7 in)
- Wing area: 14.8 m^{2} (159 sq ft)
- Aspect ratio: 16.9
- Airfoil: root:Wortmann FX-61-184; tip:Wortmann FX-60-126
- Empty weight: 320 kg (705 lb)
- Max takeoff weight: 540 kg (1,190 lb)

Performance

- Stall speed: 70 km/h (43 mph, 38 kn)
- Never exceed speed: 250 km/h (160 mph, 130 kn) ::::160 km/h (86 kn; 99 mph) on aero-tow

125 km/h (67 kn; 78 mph) on winch launch

- Maximum glide ratio: 35:1 at 95 km/h (51 kn; 59 mph)
- Rate of sink: 0.7 m/s (140 ft/min) at 75 km/h (40 kn; 47 mph)
- Wing loading: 36.5 kg/m^{2} (7.5 lb/sq ft)
