= Scheibe SF 40 =

German two-seat ultralight aircraft, 1995

SF 40 Allround

General information
- Type: Ultralight monoplane
- National origin: Germany
- Manufacturer: Scheibe Aircraft

History
- First flight: 1995

The Scheibe SF 40 is a German two-seat ultralight aircraft designed and built by Scheibe Aircraft.

The SF 40 is a two-seat low-wing ultralight monoplane with a fixed tricycle landing gear. It has a fabric-covered steel-tube fuselage with fabric-covered glass-fibre wings. The first SF 40 powered by a Sauer four-stroke engine flew in 1995 but after five were built it was replaced in 1997 by an improved variant, the SF 40C. The SF 40C is powered by a Rotax 912 engine with a two-bladed propeller, a shorter wing span than the original with increased fuel capacity. The SF 40C was awarded a type certificate in May 1998.

== Variants ==
SF 40
Sauer-powered variant, five built.
SF 40C Allround
Rotax 912-powered variant.

== Specifications (SF 40C) ==
Data from

General characteristics

- Crew: 2
- Wingspan: 9.50 m (31 ft 2 in)
- Empty weight: 287 kg (633 lb)
- Gross weight: 450 kg (992 lb)
- Powerplant: 1 × Rotax 912 flat-four piston , 60 kW (80 hp)

Performance

- Maximum speed: 200 km/h (124 mph, 108 kn)
- Stall speed: 53 km/h (39 mph, 34 kn)
- Range: 700 km (435 mi, 378 nmi)
