= Schleicher Ka-4 Rhönlerche II =

German two-seat glider, 1953

Ka-4 Rhönlerche II
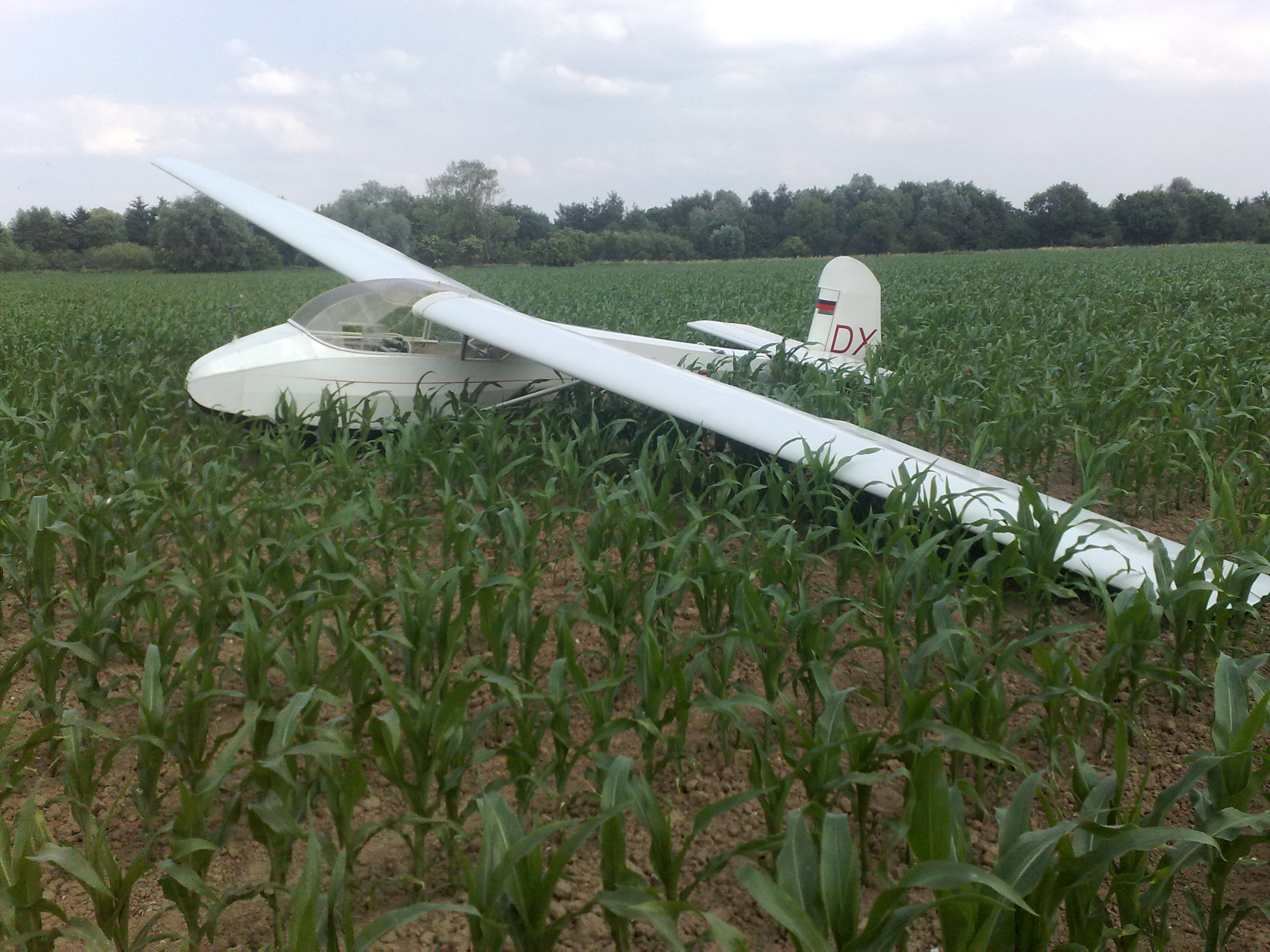

General information
- Type: Glider
- National origin: West Germany
- Manufacturer: Alexander Schleicher GmbH & Co
- Designer: Rudolf Kaiser
- Status: Production completed
- Number built: 338

History
- Introduction date: 1955
- First flight: 7 December 1953

The Schleicher Ka-4 Rhönlerche II (English: Rhön Lark), sometimes called the KA-4 or even K 4, is a West German high-wing, strut-braced, two-seat glider that was designed by Rudolf Kaiser and produced by Alexander Schleicher GmbH & Co.

== Design and development ==
The Rhönlerche II was first flown 7 December 1953. Its design goals were to produce a simple, inexpensive and robust two-seat trainer for school and club use. The design was a success and several hundred were constructed.

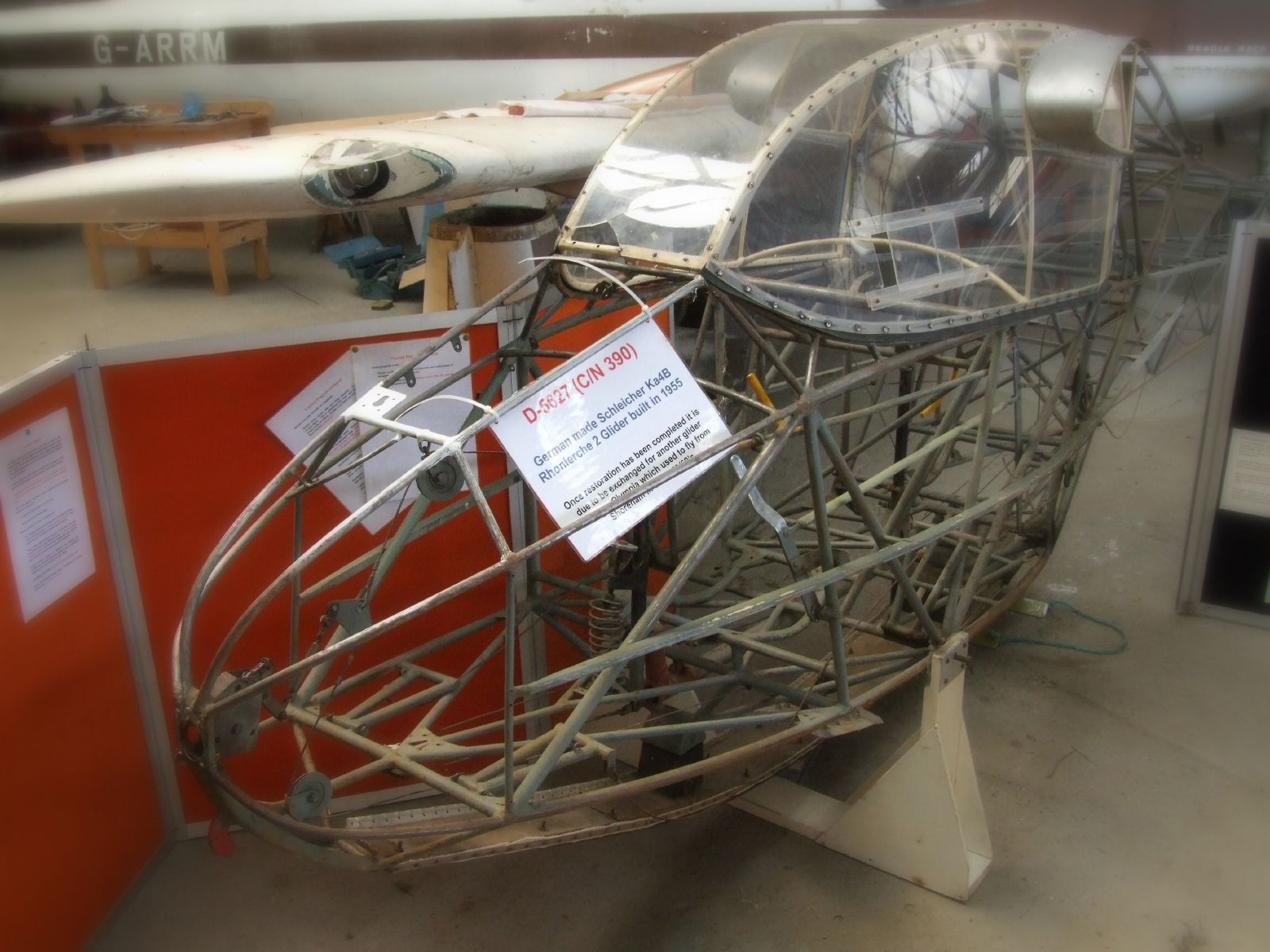
Rhönlerche fuselage showing underlying welded steel tube structure

The Rhönlerche II is constructed with a welded steel tube fuselage and a wooden wing and tail surfaces, all finished in doped aircraft fabric covering. The 13.0 m (42.7 ft) span wing is supported by single lift struts and employs a Goettingen 533 airfoil. The aircraft's landing gear is a fixed monowheel, with a nose skid.

The aircraft was issued a US type certificate on 28 September 1960.

== Operational history ==
The Ka-4 was widely used by clubs and schools in West Germany and also by Canadian military gliding clubs stationed in West Germany, including the Lahr Gliding Club at CFB Lahr. One of these aircraft was later shipped to Canada and operated by the Cold Lake Gliding Club at CFB Cold Lake and in July 2011 was owned by the Gravelbourg Gliding And Soaring Club, Gravelbourg, Saskatchewan.

In July 2011 there were still five Ka-4s on the United States Federal Aviation Administration aircraft registry.

== Aircraft on display ==
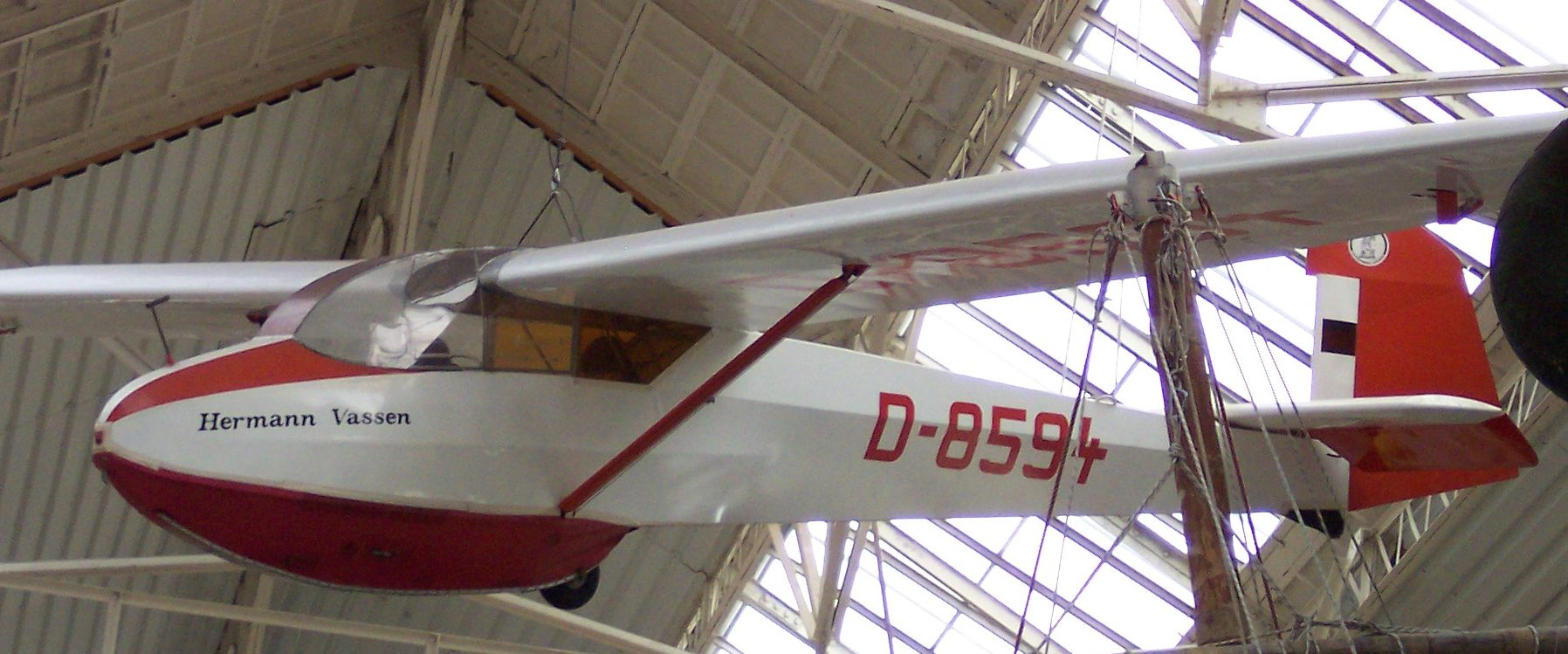
Rhönlerche on display in the Technikmuseum Speyer

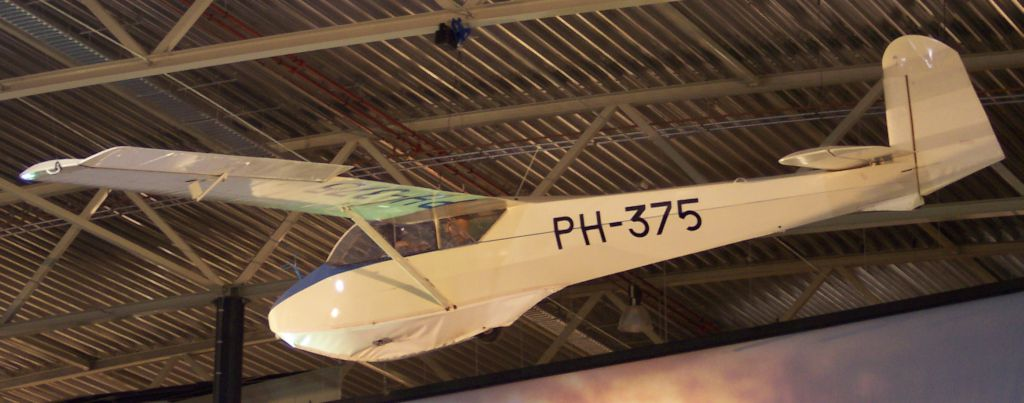
Museum Rhönlerche display

- Aviodrome - 3
- Technikmuseum Speyer
- US Southwest Soaring Museum - 2
- Austrian Aviation Museum

== Specifications (Ka-4) ==
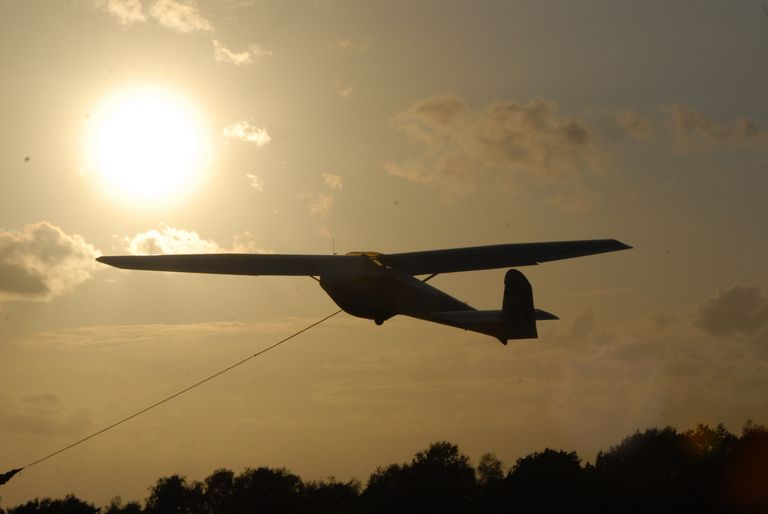
Ka-4 winch-launching

Data from Sailplane Directory, Soaring and Type Certificate 7G6, The World's Sailplanes:Die Segelflugzeuge der Welt:Les Planeurs du Monde, and manufacturer

General characteristics

- Crew: one
- Capacity: one passenger
- Length: 7.3 m (23 ft 11 in)
- Wingspan: 13 m (42 ft 8 in)
- Wing area: 16.34 m^{2} (175.9 sq ft)
- Aspect ratio: 10.3:1
- Airfoil: root: Göttingen 533 15.7%, mid: Göttingen 533 15.7%, tip: Göttingen 533 12.5%
- Empty weight: 220 kg (485 lb)
- Max takeoff weight: 400 kg (882 lb)

Performance

- Stall speed: 56 km/h (35 mph, 30 kn)
- Never exceed speed: 170 km/h (110 mph, 92 kn)
- Rough air speed max: 120 km/h (75 mph; 65 kn)
- Aerotow speed: 120 km/h (75 mph; 65 kn)
- Winch launch speed: 90 km/h (56 mph; 49 kn)
- g limits: +4.7 -2.3 at 170 km/h (106 mph)
- Maximum glide ratio: 17.5:1 at 78 km/h (48 mph)
- Rate of sink: 1.1 m/s (220 ft/min) at 62 km/h (39 mph)
- Wing loading: 24.5 kg/m^{2} (5.0 lb/sq ft)

== See also ==
Aircraft of comparable role, configuration, and era

- Scheibe Specht
- Schweizer SGU 2-22
- SZD-10 Czapla

Related lists

- List of gliders
