= Scheibe Specht =

German two-seat glider, 1953

Specht
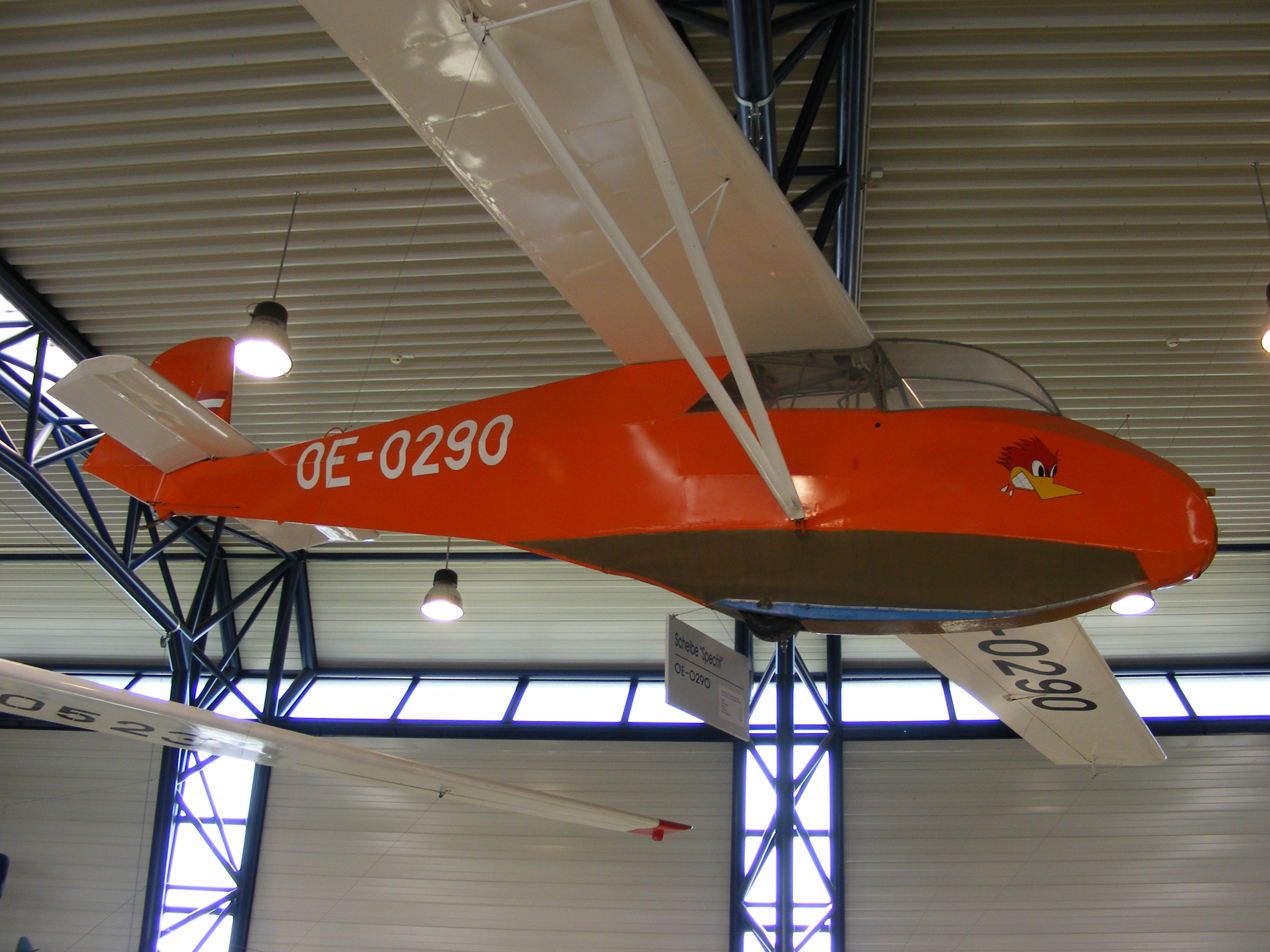

General information
- Type: Two seat training glider
- National origin: German Federal Republic
- Manufacturer: Scheibe Flugzeugbau
- Designer: Rudolf Kaiser
- Number built: 55

History
- First flight: March 1953

The Scheibe Specht (English: Woodpecker) is a tandem seat training glider produced in Germany in the early 1950s. More than fifty were built.

== Design and development ==
The Specht was designed by Rudolph Kaiser, who around 1952 was dividing his time between Scheibe in Dachau and Schleicher in Poppenhausen. Hence the Specht and its contemporary Schleicher Ka-4 Rhönlerche, also designed by Kaiser, have much in common.

The Specht has a wooden, two spar, high wing, braced on each side by V-struts from the spars to the lower fuselage, jury struts and mounted with 2° of dihedral. There is plywood skinning from the leading edge to the rear spar on the upper surface and to the forward spar below. The leading edge of the wing is straight and unswept and the trailing edge is parallel to it over its inner section, becoming tapered outboard. Ailerons, with inset hinges, fill these sections. Spoilers are mounted in the mid-inner wing panels at 11% chord.

Scheibe used their usual fabric covered, steel tube and wooden stringer construction for the fuselage. Pupil and instructor sit in tandem in an enclosed cockpit, with the rear seat accessed by an under wing door. The fuselage, flat sided and hexagonal in section, narrows to the conventional tail. The horizontal tail, mounted on top of the fuselage, is roughly rectangular in plan and of low aspect ratio and the fin and rudder together are straight tapered and flat topped. The rudder is hinged behind the elevators and extends down to the keel. The Specht lands on a fixed monowheel under the rear seat, assisted by a central skid.

The Specht prototype first flew in March 1953. Just three years (7 March 1956) later Scheibe flew the Sperber (English: Sparrowhawk), a side by side seat version. Necessarily wider in the cockpit area, the two types differed little, though the Sperber's span was 700 mm (28 in) greater and it was slightly (12 kg (26 lb)) heavier. Their performances were also very similar; the Sperber's minimum sink rate was 7% greater.

== Operational history ==
Fifty-five Spechts were produced. These were used by gliding clubs for pilot training in place of the earlier, open, single-seat primary gliders like the Zögling and its descendants. A few remained on the European civil aircraft registers in 2010. In 2009 at least two of these were flight worthy, each with historic aircraft groups in Denmark and Norway; in Sweden a third Specht, with a certificate of airworthiness valid into 2015, is owned by a similar group.

Only five Sperbers were built, one of which remained on the German civil aircraft register in 2010.

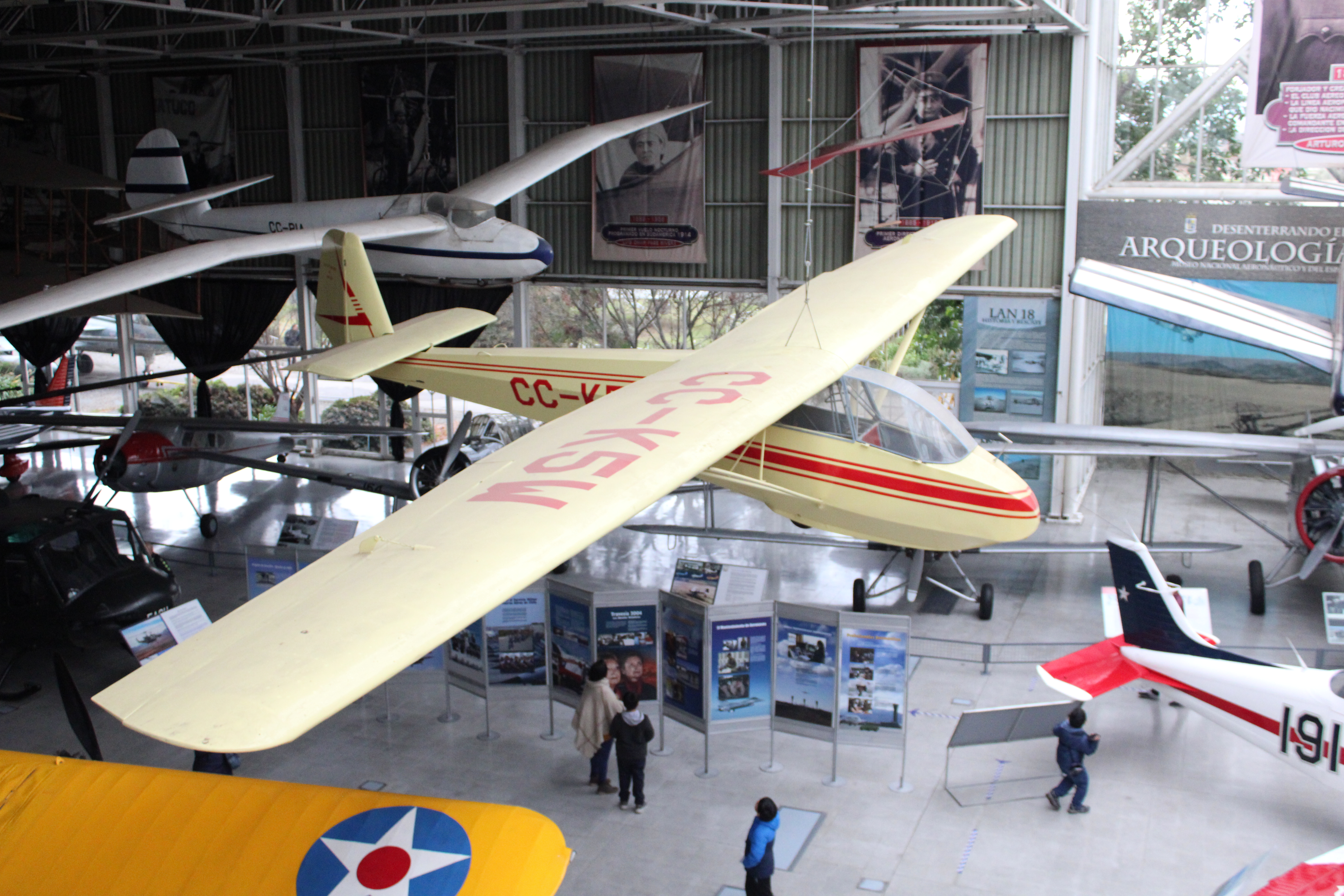
A Scheibe Specht

== Variants ==
Specht
1953 tandem-seat trainer, 55 built.
Sperber
1956 side-by-side-seat version, slightly wider and with a slightly greater span, otherwise almost identical; 5 built.

== Specifications ==
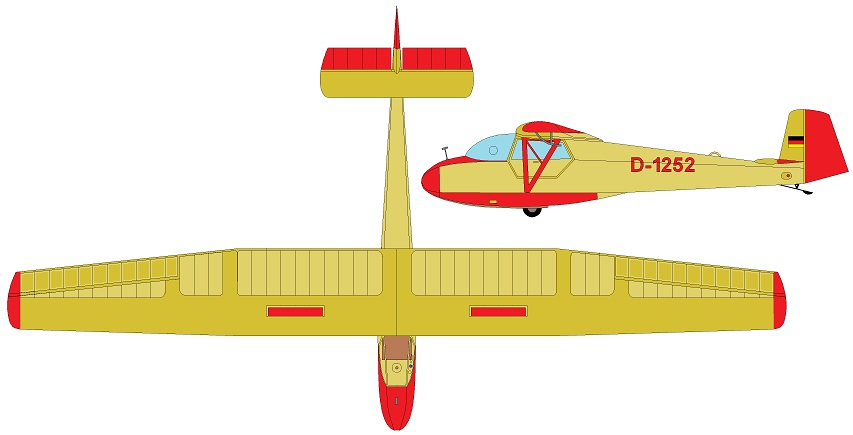

Data from The World's Sailplanes (1958) pp.77-80

General characteristics

- Crew: Two
- Wingspan: 13.50 m (44 ft 3 in)
- Wing area: 16.60 m^{2} (178.7 sq ft)
- Aspect ratio: 11.0
- Airfoil: Mü-profil 14%
- Empty weight: 206 kg (454 lb)
- Max takeoff weight: 390 kg (860 lb)

Performance

- Maximum speed: 170 km/h (110 mph, 92 kn) placard, smooth air
- Stall speed: 55 km/h (34 mph, 30 kn)
- Maximum glide ratio: best, 20:1 at 75 km/h (47 mph; 40 kn)
- Rate of sink: 0.87 m/s (171 ft/min) minimum, at 68 km/h (42 mph; 37 kn)
- Wing loading: 23.5 kg/m^{2} (4.8 lb/sq ft) maximum

== See also ==
Aircraft of comparable role, configuration, and era

- Schleicher Ka-4 Rhönlerche II

Related lists

- List of gliders
