= Scheibe Flugzeugbau =

Defunct German Aircraft Manufacturer

Scheibe Flugzeugbau was a manufacturer of sailplanes and motorgliders in Germany in the second half of the 20th century. Founded by Egon Scheibe at the Munich-Riem Airport to produce his Bergfalke design in 1951, the company had produced over 2,000 aircraft by 1985. After Egon Scheibe died in 1997, his sons-in-law took over the firm. By 2006, they were ready to relinquish control themselves due to their advanced age, but without a successor, the firm ceased operations. Hartmut Sammet subsequently founded Scheibe Aircraft GmbH in Heubach, taking over maintenance of existing Scheibe aircraft and the manufacturing rights to the Scheibe SF 25.

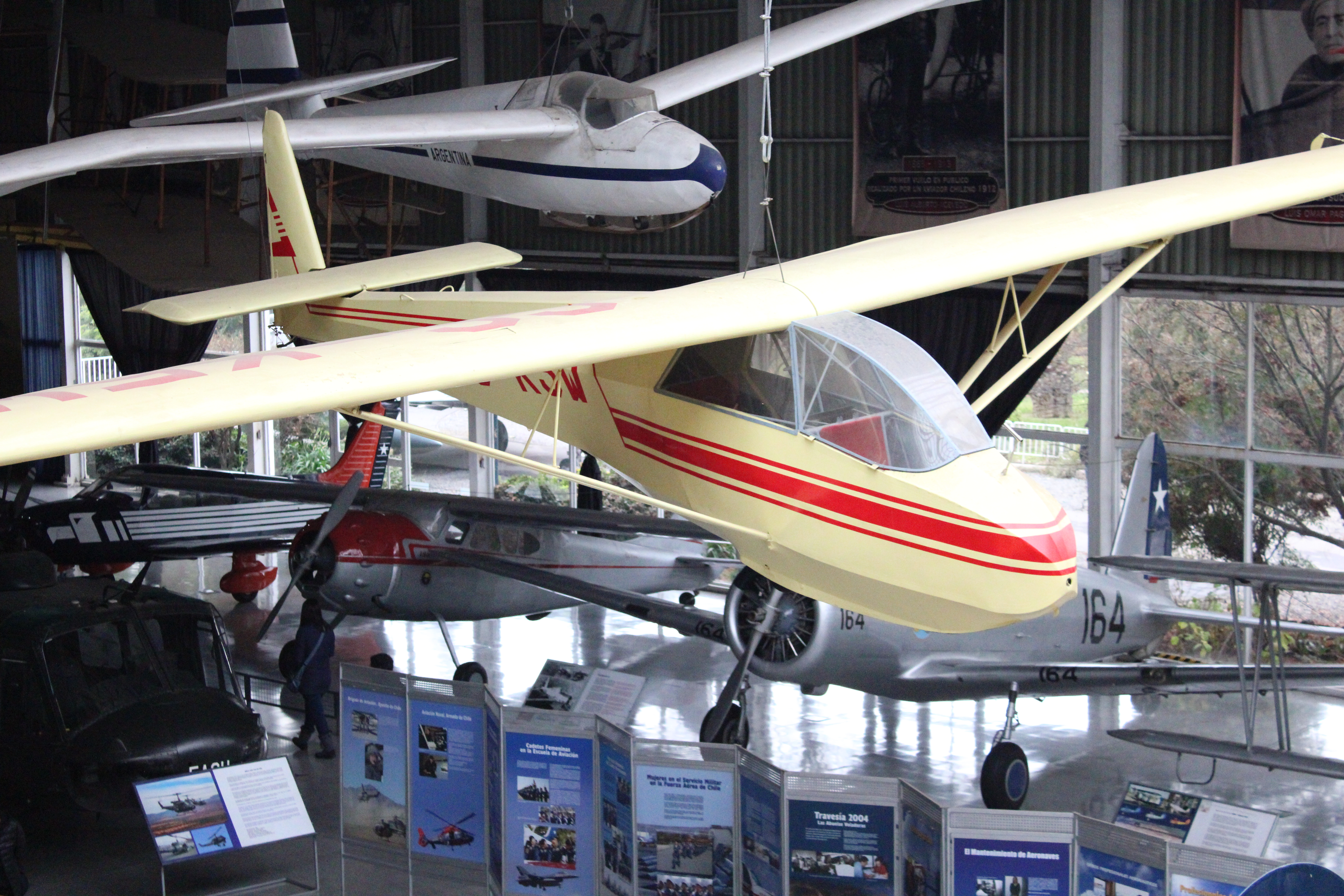
A Scheibe Specht

== Products ==
- Scheibe Bergfalke
- Scheibe Spatz
- Scheibe Specht
- Scheibe Sperber
- Scheibe Zugvogel
- Scheibe SF-23 Sperling
- Scheibe SF-24 Motorspatz
- Scheibe SF-25 Falke
- Scheibe SF 26 Super Spatz
- Scheibe SF-27 Zugvogel V
- Scheibe SF-28 Tandem Falke
- Scheibe SF-29
- Scheibe SF-30 Club-Spatz
- Scheibe SFS-31
- Scheibe SF-32
- Scheibe SF-33
- Scheibe SF-34 Delphin
- Scheibe SF-35
- Scheibe SF-36
- Scheibe SF 40
- Scheibe SF 41
