= Scheibe Bergfalke =

German two-seat glider, 1951

Bergfalke
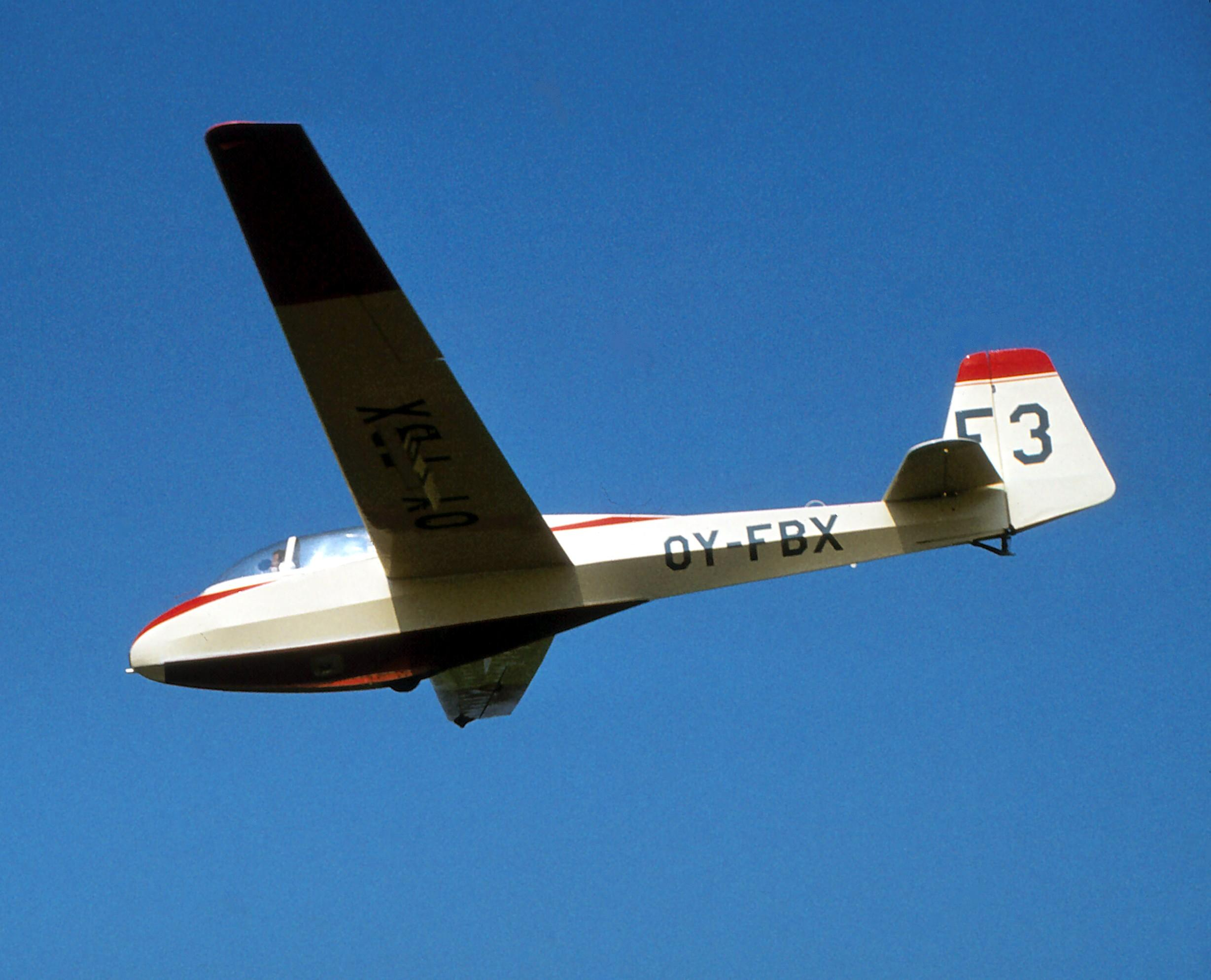
- Scheibe Bergfalke III

General information
- Type: Sailplane
- National origin: Germany
- Manufacturer: Scheibe
- Designer: Egon Scheibe
- Number built: more than 320 by 1982

History
- First flight: 5 August 1951
- Developed from: Akaflieg München Mü13

The Scheibe Bergfalke (German: "mountain hawk") is a German glider designed by Egon Scheibe as a post-World War II development of the Akaflieg München Mü13 produced before and during the war.

== Design and development ==
The prototype flew on 5 August 1951 as the Akaflieg München Mü13E Bergfalke I and by the end of the year, Scheibe had established his own works at the Munich-Riem Airport to produce the type as the Bergfalke II. It was a mid-wing sailplane of conventional design with a non-retractable monowheel undercarriage and a tailskid. The fuselage was a welded steel structure covered in fabric and enclosed two seats in tandem. The wings had a single wooden spar and were covered in plywood.

Subsequent versions introduced forward sweep to the wings, a more aerodynamic canopy, airbrakes, and a tailwheel in place of the tailskid. By 1982, Scheibe had built over 300 of these aircraft, and Stark Ibérica built a number of the Bergfalke III version under license in Spain. Scheibe also developed a motorglider version as the Bergfalke IVM but this did not enter production.

In 1976, two Bergfalke motorgliders participated in the Sixth German Motor Glider Competition. Later, one of these aircraft set a world 300 km triangle record.

== Variants ==
Mü13E Bergfalke I
Prototype
Bergfalke II
First production version, 4° forward sweep on wings
Bergfalke II/55
Skopil Bergfalke II/55
Motorglider conversion done by Arnold Skopil of Aberdeen, Washington, United States in 1957. One converted.
Bergfalke III
Streamlined canopy, taller fin and rudder, Schempp-Hirth airbrakes, 2° forward sweep on wings
Bergfalke IV
Wing of Wortmann section with 60-cm (2-ft) greater span
Bergfalke IVM
Motorglider version with 39-kW (52-hp) Hirth O-28 engine mounted on retractable pylon behind cockpit.

== Specifications (Bergfalke II/55) ==
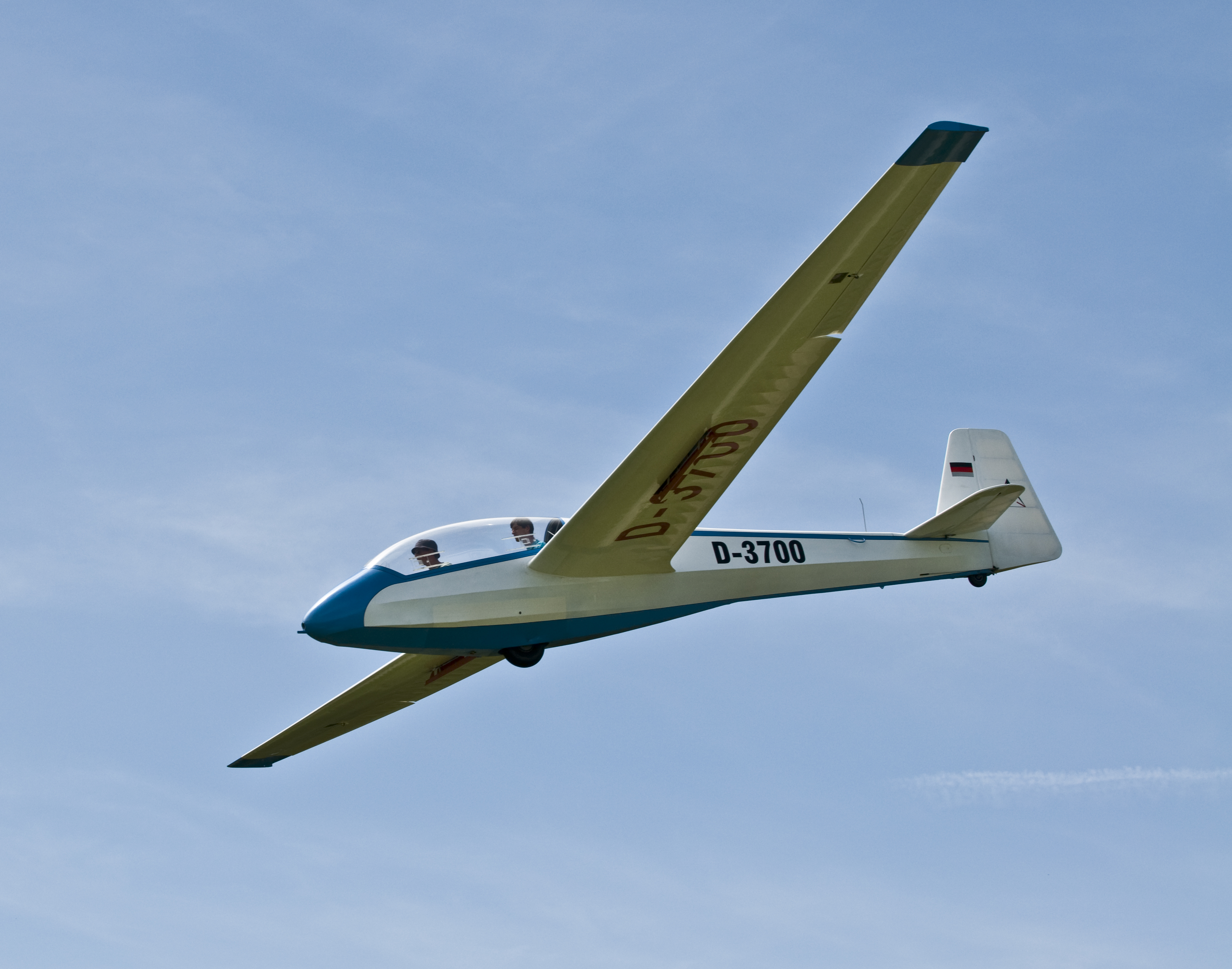
Scheibe Bergfalke IV on final

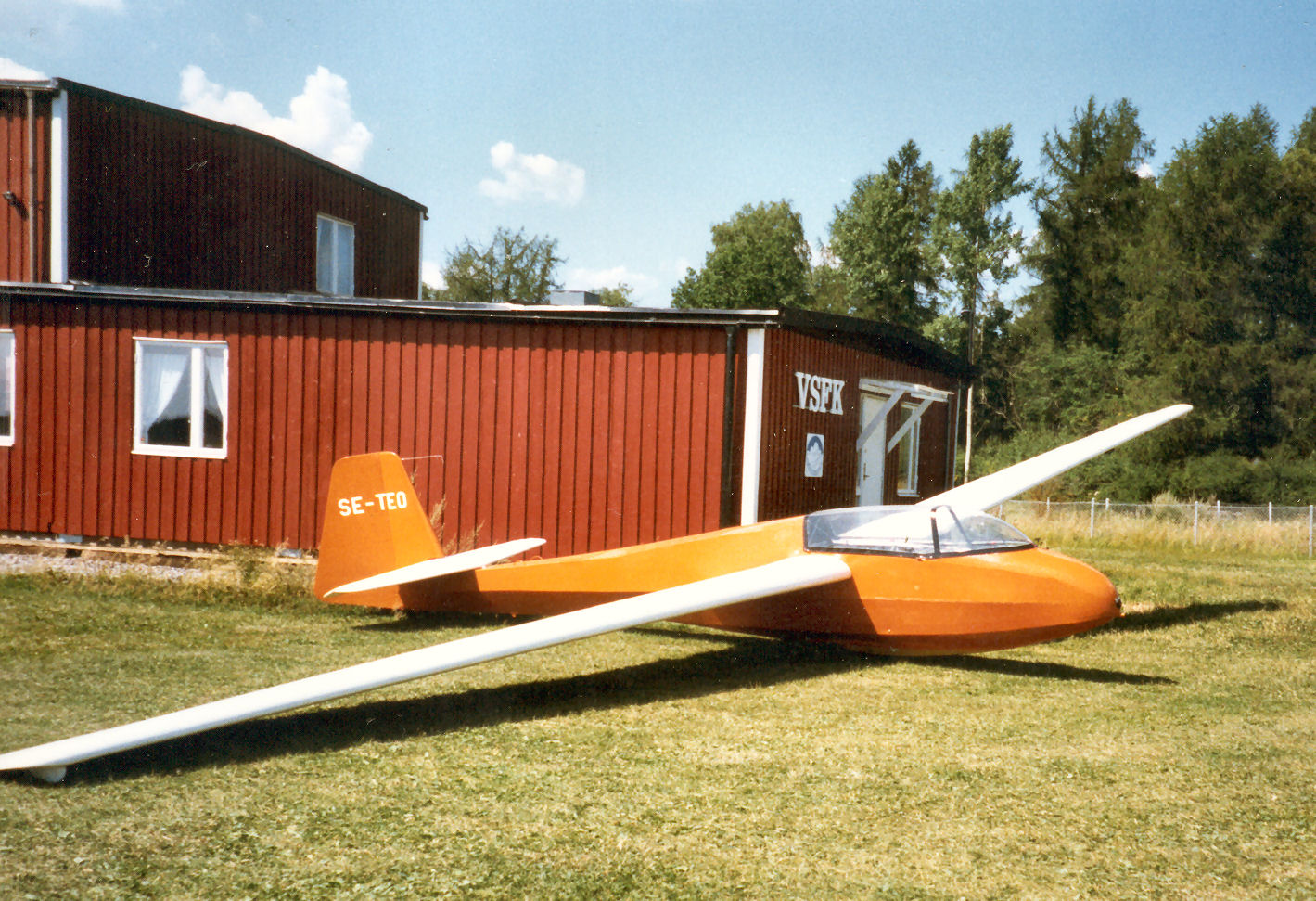
1966 Scheibe Bergfalke III

Data from The World's Sailplanes:Die Segelflugzeuge der Welt:Les Planeurs du Monde

General characteristics

- Crew: 2
- Length: 8 m (26 ft 3 in)
- Wingspan: 16.6 m (54 ft 6 in)
- Wing area: 17.7 m^{2} (191 sq ft)
- Aspect ratio: 15.6
- Airfoil: Mü-Profil 14.5%
- Empty weight: 246 kg (542 lb)
- Max takeoff weight: 440 kg (970 lb)

Performance

- Stall speed: 60 km/h (37 mph, 32 kn)
- Never exceed speed: 160 km/h (99 mph, 86 kn)
- Rough air speed max: 120 km/h (75 mph; 65 kn)
- Aerotow speed: 120 km/h (75 mph; 65 kn)
- Winch launch max speed: 85 km/h (53 mph; 46 kn)
- Terminal velocity: 205 km/h (127 mph; 111 kn) (max all-up weight + full airbrakes / flaps)
- g limits: +4 -2
- Maximum glide ratio: 28:1 at 80 km/h (50 mph; 43 kn)
- Rate of sink: 0.72 m/s (142 ft/min) at 72 km/h (45 mph; 39 kn)
- Wing loading: 24.8 kg/m^{2} (5.1 lb/sq ft)

== See also ==
Aircraft of comparable role, configuration, and era

- Schleicher ASK 13
