= Spaatz =

Spaatz may refer to:

- Spaatz Island, Antarctica
- Carl Spaatz (1891–1974), US Air Force general
- Carl A. Spaatz Field, at Reading Regional Airport, Pennsylvania
- General Carl A. Spaatz Award, a U.S. Civil Air Patrol decoration
