= Scheibe SF-27 =

German single-seat glider, 1964

SF-27 Zugvogel V
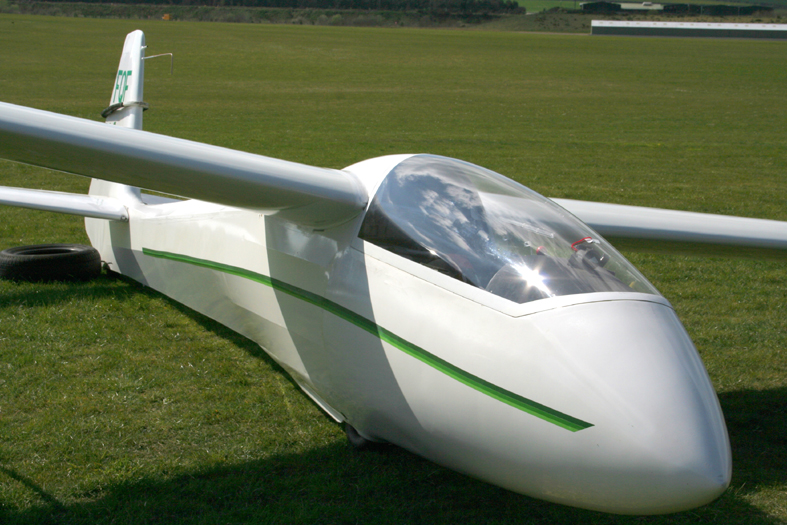

General information
- Type: Single seat Standard Class Sailplane
- National origin: Germany
- Manufacturer: Scheibe-Flugzeugbau-gmbh, Dachau
- Number built: about 120

History
- First flight: 12 May 1964
- Developed from: Scheibe Zugvogel

The Scheibe SF-27 Zugvogel V (English: Migratory Bird) is a single-seat Standard Class sailplane, designed and built in Germany in the 1960s. A motorised version was also produced. Significant numbers remain active.

== Design and development ==
The SF-27 is a shoulder-wing, single-seat Standard Class sailplane, succeeding the Scheibe Zugvogel IIIB in production. It was designed to 1960s Standard Class competition rules requiring a span of no more than 15 m and a fixed undercarriage. Built of wood and steel, its structure was conservative; at a time when many manufacturers were using glassfibre structurally in wings and fuselages, the SF-27 only used it to cover the forward fuselage.

The wing of the SF-27 is built around a single beechwood boxspar, with plywood ribs and a leading edge torsion box. The wing covering is largely ply, entirely so over the outer section. The inner section is covered with ply from the leading-edge to behind the spar, the rest with a mixture of ply and fabric. Ailerons and Schempp-Hirth airbrakes are likewise ply covered. The cantilever horizontal tail is an all-moving ply and fabric-covered surface, set at the top of the fuselage; the fin is covered with ply and the rudder with fabric.

The fuselage is a welded steel structure covered, from nose to wing trailing edge, with a glassfibre shell. The wing root fairing is also glassfibre. Further aft the fuselage is fabric covered over wooden stringers. The cockpit, within the glassfibre shell, has a single piece Plexiglas canopy, the pilot sitting in a semi-reclined position. The SF-27 has a fixed monowheel undercarriage, fitted with brakes, plus a small tailwheel.

The SF-27 first flew on 12 May 1964. 30 had been built by February 1966, the final total being about 120. Scheibe also produced a motorised version, the SF-27M, with a 26 hp (19 kW) 4-cylinder Hirth F-102 A2 two stroke engine on a retractable mast above the wing behind the cockpit. Its gross weight is increased to 386 kg (850 lb) and it is 115 millimetres (4.5 in) longer, with a best glide ratio 32:1.

== Operational history ==
Around 58 of the original 120 Sf-27s are still active in 2010, including several SF-27Ms.

== Variants ==
SF-27A
Standard class sailplane.
SF-27B
One-off 17 m span version.
SF-27M
Motorised version.
SLCA-10 Topaze
Licence built variant built in France by Société Lorraine de Constructions Aéronautiques (SLCA)

== Specifications (SF-27A) ==
Data from Jane's All the World's Aircraft 1966/7

General characteristics

- Crew: 1
- Length: 7.05 m (23 ft 2 in)
- Wingspan: 15.0 m (49 ft 3 in)
- Wing area: 12.99 m^{2} (139.8 sq ft)
- Aspect ratio: 18.6
- Airfoil: Wortmann FX 61-184 at root, FX 60-126 at tip
- Empty weight: 215 kg (474 lb) equipped
- Max takeoff weight: 330 kg (728 lb)

Performance

- Stall speed: 55 km/h (34 mph, 30 kn)
- Maximum glide ratio: 34:1 at 88 km/h (55 mph)
- Rate of sink: 0.64 m/s (126 ft/min) best, at 74 km/h (46 mph)
