= Scheibe Spatz =

Single-seat German glider, 1952

Spatz
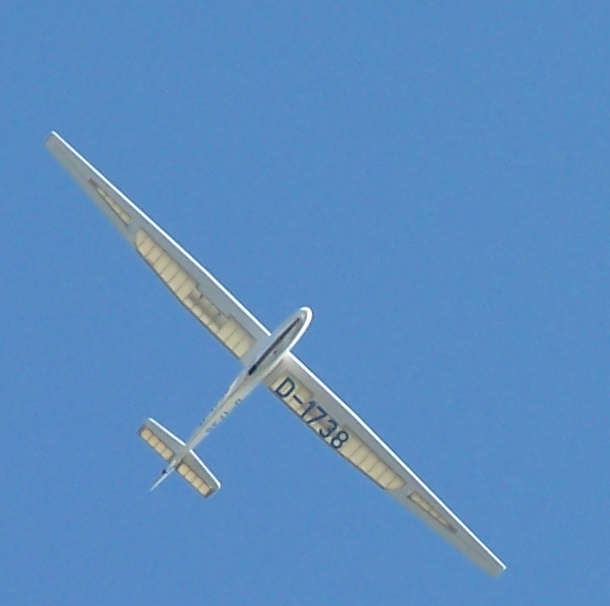
- L-Spatz 55 D-1738

General information
- Type: Sailplane
- National origin: Germany
- Manufacturer: Scheibe
- Number built: 471 (L-Spatz)

History
- First flight: 1952

The Scheibe Spatz (German: "Sparrow") is a German glider with a mixed metal and wood construction that was built in 1952 until 1962. Later versions were known as the L-Spatz, the letter L standing for Leistung, which is German for "performance".

Scheibe Flugzeugbau built the Spatz A in 1952. Two years later in 1954 the first L-Spatz 55 was airborne. Three hundred L-Spatz 55s were built in Germany, 155 in France under the name Avialsa A.60 Fauconnet, and 16 in Italy as the Meteor MS-30 L Passero; production was discontinued in 1962.

It is a single-seater cantilever shoulder-winged sailplane with a cruising (max L/D) speed of 45 mph. It has an empty weight of 157 kg and a maximum take-off weight of 269 kg. The single spar wing and tail were constructed using fabric-covered wood, whereas the fuselage consisted of steel tubing covered with fabric.

The L-Spatz 55 has good climbing performance due to light construction. The glide angle is 29:1. The longest known cross-country flight was more than 600 km from Burg Feuerstein, Germany to France.

Many gliding clubs operated the L-Spatz 55, well known for its easy handling, including easy recovery from a spin.

== Variants ==
Spatz A
Certified in 1952 with a 13.20 metre wingspan, 6.19 m length.
Spatz B
Strengthened and improved variant with a 13.20 metre wingspan, 6.19 m length, certified in 1952.
Spatz 55
Certified in 1952 with a 13.20 metre wingspan, 6.25 m length.
L-Spatz
Certified in 1954 with a 15.00 metre wingspan, 6.05 m length.
L-Spatz 55
Certified in 1954 with a 15.00 metre wingspan, 6.25 m length.
L-Spatz III
Certified in 1966 with a 15.00 metre wingspan, 6.25 m length.

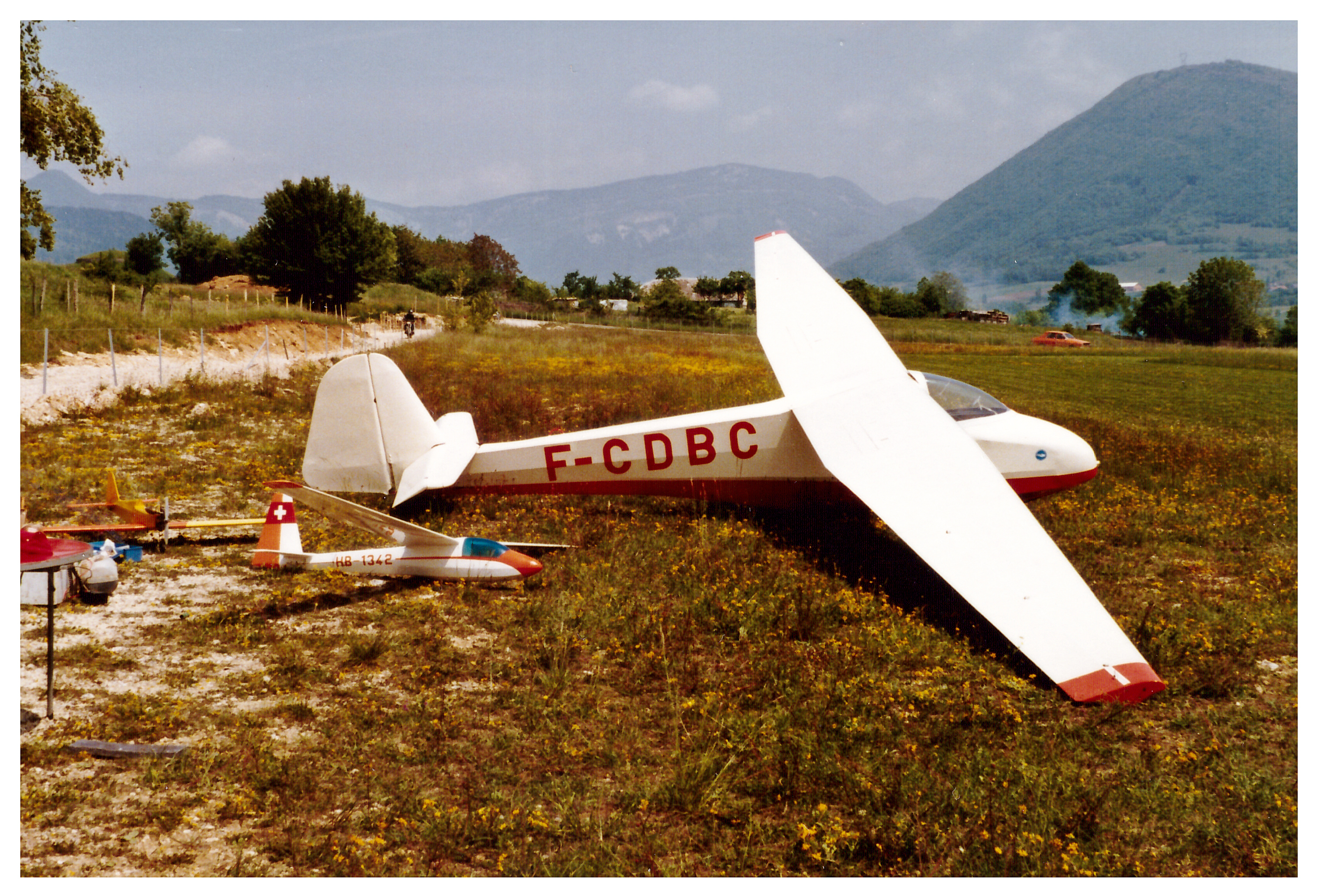
French Avialsa A60 on Bellegarde-sur-Valserine (France) field

Avialsa 60 Fauconnet
Licence production in France.
Meteor MS-30 L-Passero
Licence production in Italy.
Electravia Electro Light 2
Electric aircraft version powered by an electric drive system, with a nose-mounted propeller.

== Aircraft on display ==
- Museum für Luftfahrt und Technik
- National Soaring Museum
- Museum of Military Technique GRYF in Dąbrówka near Wejherowo (Poland)

== Specifications (L-Spatz 55) ==
Data from The World's Sailplanes:Die Segelflugzeuge der Welt:Les Planeurs du Monde

General characteristics

- Crew: 1
- Length: 6.25 m (20 ft 6 in)
- Wingspan: 15 m (49 ft 3 in)
- Wing area: 11.7 m^{2} (126 sq ft)
- Aspect ratio: 19
- Airfoil: Mü-Profil 14%
- Empty weight: 153 kg (337 lb)
- Max takeoff weight: 265 kg (584 lb)

Performance

- Never exceed speed: 180 km/h (110 mph, 97 kn)
- Rough air speed max: 110 km/h (68 mph; 59 kn)
- Aerotow speed: 110 km/h (68 mph; 59 kn)
- Winch launch max speed: 90 km/h (56 mph; 49 kn)
- Terminal velocity: 200 km/h (124.3 mph; 108.0 kn)
- g limits: +4 -2
- Maximum glide ratio: 29 at 80 km/h (50 mph; 43 kn)
- Rate of sink: 0.58 m/s (114 ft/min) at 67 km/h (42 mph; 36 kn)
- Wing loading: 22.6 kg/m^{2} (4.6 lb/sq ft)

== See also ==
Aircraft of comparable role, configuration, and era

- Schleicher K 8
