= Egon Scheibe =

German aviation engineer

Egon Scheibe (28 September 1908 – 26 September 1997) was a German aviation engineer who, among other things, developed the Scheibe Bergfalke glider.

== Life and career ==
Egon Scheibe was born in Munich on 28 September 1908, the son of a bookbinder. He studied there at the gymnasium and the Technical University; beginning in 1928, while a student of aircraft construction, he worked on the models Mü-4 to Mü-13 of the Akaflieg München (Munich Academic Flight Group). After graduating in 1933, he worked in sport gliding until 1935. From 1935 to 1937, when he passed his master's examination in aircraft construction, he was chief of aircraft construction at the Deutsche Versuchsanstalt für Luftfahrt (German Experimental Agency for Aeronautics, one of the predecessors of the German Aerospace Center), working at the Luftwaffe testing centre in Rechlin, then from 1938 to 1945, despite never becoming a member of the Nazi Party, he worked in the Air Ministry in Berlin developing new aircraft.

After World War II, he at first built bicycles, mini-cars and motorised tricycles, developed the Mü-13E Bergfalke design in Tyrol, then in 1951 in Dachau founded Scheibe Flugzeugbau, originally in a barracks at the former Telefunken plant. The first Bergfalke was produced the same year, and the company also produced the Spatz single-seater. Beginning in 1957, Scheibe turned to pioneering the development of powered gliders. By his 80th birthday, Scheibe Flugzeugbau had produced some 2,200 aircraft. Scheibe continued to be actively involved in the company to an advanced age, focussing on further development of single- and two-seater powered gliders. There were usually between 50 and 60 employees.

He died two days before his 89th birthday.

== Work ==
Scheibe's 1930 work with Akaflieg was a major part of the "Munich School" of sailplane construction. He pioneered the use of steel tubing in glider construction.

After the war, his Mü-13E, continuing the Akaflieg series numbering, was the first post-war high-performance German sailplane. He was one of the most important developers of motorised gliders and originated the touring motor-glider.
