= RLM numbering system for gliders and sailplanes =

Contrary to the methods used by the Reich Air Ministry (RLM) for the allocation of aircraft designations, the designers and manufacturers of sailplanes and gliders in Germany enjoyed the freedom of choosing their own designations for their products up until 1945.

Thus a bird name like Habicht could be used, or a number combined with two or more letters, stemming from the designer's or factory's name, such as DFS, RRG or Göppingen. The RLM assigned every design a separate number to provide a common basis for an exchange of drawings in the event of an intended production under license by firms, clubs or individuala and to secure the provision of spare parts. A rigid system of rules for the form and order of drawings was applied.

Whereas RLM aircraft designations were prefixed by the number 8, glider references began with "108-", for example 108-53 referred to the DFS Habicht.

In a relaxation of the regulations regarding allocation of aircraft designations, the designers and manufacturers of sailplanes and gliders in Germany enjoyed the freedom of choosing their own designations for their products up until 1945, but some of the more common aircraft were issued RLM designations in the 108 series.

108-10
Schneider Grunau 9 - primary glider (1929)

108-11
RRG Zögling 33 - primary glider (1933)

108-14
DFS Schulgleiter SG.38 - standard basic gliding trainer (1938)

108-15
RRG Zögling 12m - primary glider (1934)

108-16
Weber EW-2 - four-seat high-performance sailplane

108-21
Hirth Hi 21 - two-seat sailplane

108-22
Hirth Hi-20 MoSe - (for Motorsegler = motor glider); motorized glider

108-29
Fliege IIa - primary glider (1935)

108-30
DFS Kranich II - two-seat sailplane (1935)

108-47
Schleicher / Jacobs Rhönadler - single-seat high-performance sailplane (1932)

108-48
Dittmar Condor I - high-performance sailplane (1932)

108-49
Schneider / DFS Grunau Baby II - glider (1932)

108-50
Jacobs Rhönbussard - single-seat high-performance sailplane (1933)

108-51
Jacobs / Schweyer / DFS Rhönsperber - single-seat high-performance sailplane (1935)

108-53
DFS Habicht - single-seat acrobatics sailplane (1936)

108-56
Dittmar Condor II - single-seat high-performance sailplane (1935)

108-58
Hirth Göppingen Gö 1 Wolf - sailplane (1935)

108-59
Hirth Göppingen Gö 3 Minimoa - high-performance sailplane (1935)

108-60
Jacobs / DFS Reiher - single-seat high-performance sailplane (1937)

108-61
Hütter / Schempp-Hirth Göppingen Gö 4 - two-seat sailplane (1937)

108-62
Schwarzwald-Flugzeugbau Donaueschingen Strolch - high-performance sailplane

108-63
Akaflieg München Mü 13D Merlin - high-performance sailplane (1936)

108-64
Schwarzwald-Flugzeugbau Donaueschingen Ibis

108-65
Dittmar Condor III - single-seat high-performance sailplane (1938)

108-66
Schneider Grunau Baby III - sailplane (1938)

108-67
Hütter Hü 17 - sailplane (1937)

108-68
Jacobs / Schweyer / DFS Weihe - high-performance single-seat sailplane (1938)

108-70
Jacobs / DFS Olympia Meise - high-performance single-seat sailplane (1939)

108-72
Akaflieg München Mü 17 Merle - high-performance sailplane (1939)

108-74
FVA Aachen / Schmetz FVA 10b Rheinland - high-performance sailplane

== Gliders with unknown or not issued RLM designator ==
- Akaflieg Darmstadt D28b Windspiel
- Akaflieg Darmstadt D-30 Cirrus
- Akaflieg Darmstadt D31
- Akaflieg München Mü10 Milan
- Blessing Kolibri-B
- DFS Fafnir II
- DFS Präsident
- FAG Chemnitz C 11
- FAG Esslingen E 3
- FV Aachen FVA 11 Eifel
- FV Aachen FVA 9
- Akaflieg Berlin B 5
- Akaflieg Berlin B 6
- Akaflieg Berlin B 8
- Akaflieg Hannover AFH 4
- Akaflieg Stuttgart FS-16
- Akaflieg Stuttgart FS-18
- Grunau 7 Moazagotl
- Grunau 8
- Grunau Commodore
- Gumpert Schwalbe II
- Horten H.II
- Horten H.III
- Hütter Hü 28
- Raab R2

After the Second World War, gliding was prohibited in Germany, but when the sport began again in 1951, glider types were allocated a Geräte-Nummer (Type Approval number). New designs were given numbers from 101, but the following older types used their RLM designation as the Geräte-Nummer:
