= German Gliding Museum =

Aviation museum in Hesse, Germany

Coordinates: 50.4984°N 9.9459°E

German Glider Museum
- Deutsches Segelflugmuseum mit Modellflug
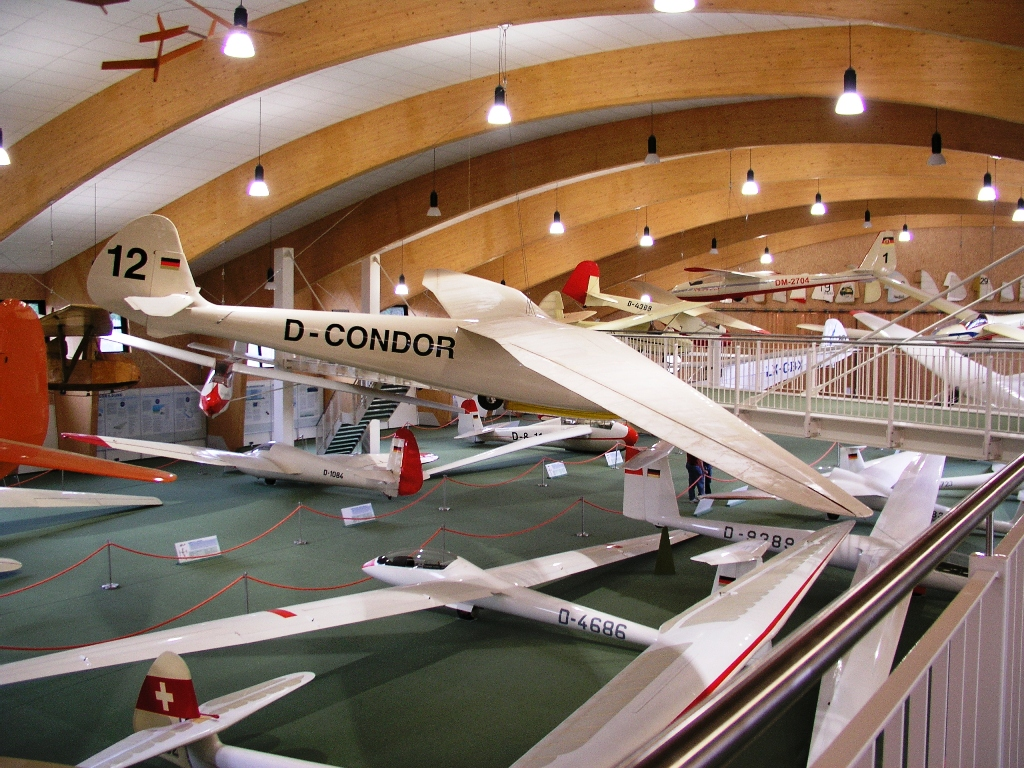
- Established: August 1987
- Location: Wasserkuppe, 15 km east of Fulda, Germany
- Type: Aviation Museum
- Website: http://info@egelflugmuseum.de

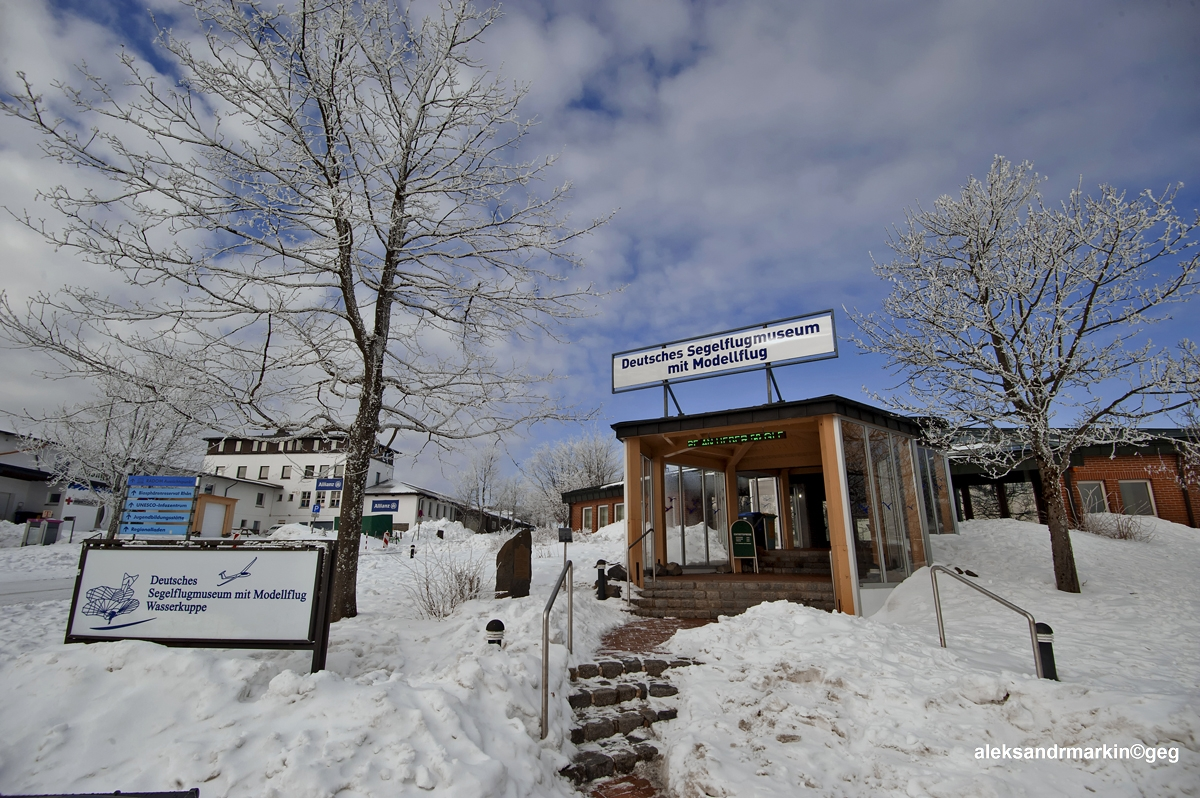

The German Glider Museum (German: Deutsches Segelflugmuseum mit Modellflug), situated on the Wasserkuppe in the German state of Hesse is the national gliding museum, opened in 1987.

== History ==
German glider pilots and designers have made many contributions to the development of glider aerodynamics and flight techniques. The Wasserkuppe has been a gliding site since about 1910 and was closely associated with the emergence of gliding as a sport during the interwar period. In particular it hosted the annual series of gliding competitions, started in 1920, that became known as the Rhön contests. Initially national, they became international events.

Because of its long association with the sport, it seemed a natural home for a national gliding museum, an idea conceived in 1970 with the 50th anniversary of the first Rhön contest. The Deutsches Segelflugmuseum mit Modellflug was officially opened in August 1987 in a purpose-built hall. By 2014 the collection included more than sixty aircraft, all German, showing their development from Otto Lilienthal's hang gliders through wooden machines to the earliest glassfibre aircraft of the 1960s. There are also photographic records, focussing on the series of Rhön contests, with aircraft pilots and designers.

The museum has a store for aircraft which are not currently on display and a workshop for restoring them. In 2014 these held some twenty-five aircraft.

== Content ==
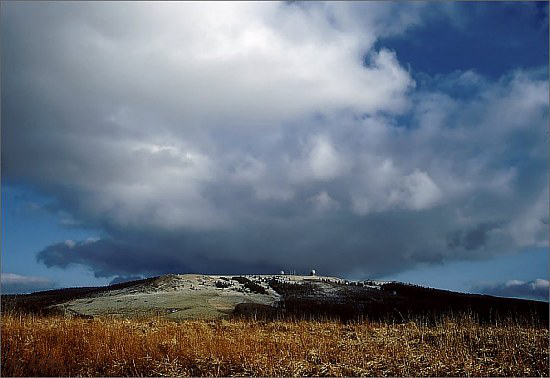

List from Bob Ogden, Air Britain News, November 2014.

=== On display ===
- Aachen FBA 10B Rheinland
- Akaflieg Braunschweig SB-5 Danzig
- Akaflieg Darmstadt D-36
- Akaflieg Darmstadt H2-PL Musterle
- Akaflieg Hannover Vampyr
- Akaflieg Stuttgart FS-24 Phönix
- Avialsa-Scheibe A.60 Fauconnet
- Binder ASH-25 EB28
- Bölkow Phoebus
- Dittmar Condor IV
- Dittmar HD-53 Möwe
- Darmstadt FSV-X
- Aachen FVA-2 Blaue Maus
- Focke-Wulf Weihe 50
- Glasflügel BS-1
- Glasflügel Club Libelle
- Göppingen Gö 1 Wolf
- Göppingen Gö 3 Minimoa
- Göppingen Gö 4 Gövier
- Horten 33
- Hütter H 17A
- Jacobs Kranich II
- Jacobs Meise
- Jacobs Reiher III
- Jacobs Rhönadler 35
- Jacobs Rhönbussard
- Jacobs Rhönsperber
- Kaiser Ka-1 Rhönlaus
- Lilienthal Normalsegelapparat
- Lilienthal Standard Doppeldecker
- Lippisch Falke
- Lippisch Grüne Post
- Lippisch Hols der Teufel
- Pelzner Hang Glider
- Raab Motorraab
- Rolladen-Schneider LS1
- Rolladen-Schneider LSD Ornith
- Scheibe Mü 13E Bergfalke
- Scheibe Zugvogel
- Schleicher ASW 12
- Schleicher Ka-4 Rhönlerche II
- Schleicher Ka-6 Rhönsegler
- Schneider ES-49
- Schneider Grunau 9
- Schneider Grunau Baby IIa
- Schneider Grunau Baby IIb
- Schneider Grunau Baby
- Schneider Grunau Baby V
- Schneider-Hofmann-Rehberg SG-38 (nacelle only)
- Schneider-Hofmann-Rehberg SG-38
- Schultz FS-3 Besenstiel
- Stamer-Lippisch Ente
- VBAL FES-530 Lehrmeister
- VBAL Lom 58/II Libelle Laminar
- VBAL Lommatzsch Lom-59 Lo-Meise
- VBAL Lom-61 Favorit V.1
- Vogt Lo 100 Zwergreiher
- Volmer Jensen VJ-23
- Watzlawek M76
- Wolfmüller glider

== See also ==
- List of aerospace museums
- List of gliders
