= DFS Sperber Junior =

German competition sailplane (1936)

Sperber Junior
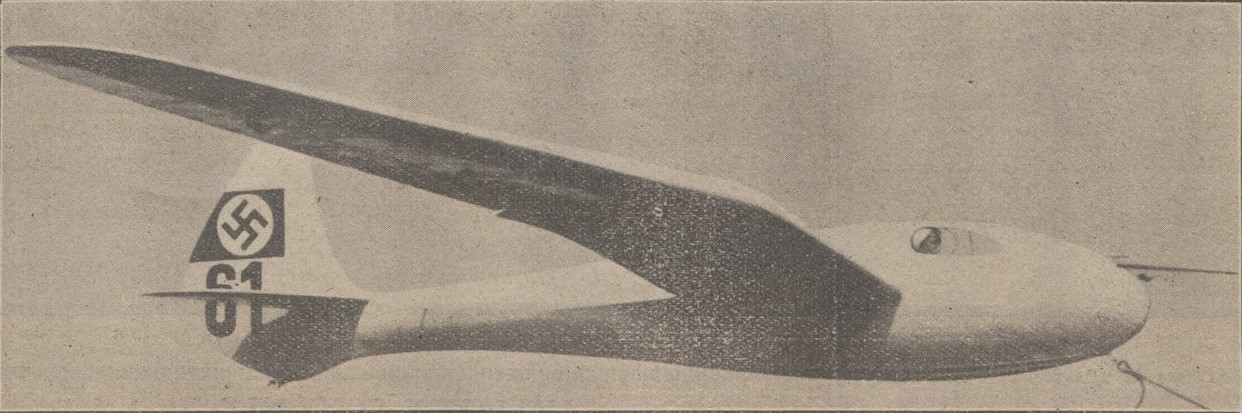

General information
- Type: Competition sailplane
- National origin: Germany
- Manufacturer: Deutsche Forschungsanstalt für Segelflug (DFS)
- Designer: Hans Jacobs
- Number built: 1

History
- First flight: 1936

The DFS Sperber Junior (English: Hawk Junior) was a competition sailplane designed for Hanna Reitsch and built in Germany in 1936.

== Design and development ==
The Sperber Junior, was designed as a development of the Rhönsperber for Hanna Reitsch by Hans Jacobs. It had much in common with his other Rhönsperber development, the Sperber Senior, though the latter was intended for large pilots. Reitsch's small and light frame allowed a narrower cockpit than in the Senior in a revised, more slender forward fuselage, a tight fit for her and too small for her contemporaries. This increased the fuselage length, though the span was 400 mm (16 in) less. A different airfoil section, the same as on the Rhönsperber, was used and the gull wing was more pronounced with airbrakes on the inner wing.

It was a shoulder wing aircraft with a double straight tapered gull wing, built around two spars and fabric covered apart from the leading edge from the front spar forward and the wing roots, which were plywood skinned. The wing roots were carefully faired into the fuselage. The inner panels, filling about one third of the span had only slight taper, the sweep entirely on the trailing edge; the inner parts of them carried about 10° of dihedral but they flattened outboard. Spoilers were mounted on the bend, behind the front spar and opening above the wing. The outer panels had no dihedral but were strongly tapered, swept mostly on the trailing edge with a taper ratio of 0.42. Ailerons occupied the whole of the outer panels' trailing edges.

The Junior had a completely ply covered fuselage with a narrow ovoid cross section which tapered progressively to the tail. The cockpit was just ahead of the wing, under a largely ply fairing smoothly integrated into the nose and fuselage; its only transparencies were portholes in its slightly concave sides. The cockpit fairing was removable for access; aft, it blended immediately into the fuselage line without the long fairing of the Sperber Senior. A tapered, round tipped and largely fabric covered horizontal tail was mounted on top of the fuselage, far enough forward to place the trailing edges of its elevators at the rudder hinge line. The latter was mounted on a narrow ply covered fin, carefully faired into the fuselage and extending below it to form a tail bumper. The mostly fabric covered rudder was full, curved and slightly pointed, likewise extending below the fuselage. A short skid from just behind the nose to beyond mid-chord completed the undercarriage.

== Operational history ==
As a woman Reitsch had serious problems with her admission into the 1936 German National Competitions on the Wasserkuppe but managed fifth place. In May 1937 she was one of a group of five pilots who soared from Salzburg across the Alps for 100 miles into Italy. After that she became more absorbed in military testing and the Junior was lost in World War II.

== Specifications ==
Data from Sailplanes 1920-1945 (2006) pp.116-7

General characteristics

- Crew: One
- Length: 6.512 m (21 ft 4 in)
- Wingspan: 15.60 m (51 ft 2 in)
- Height: 1.80 m (5 ft 11 in) in level flight configuration
- Wing area: 16.2 m^{2} (174 sq ft)
- Aspect ratio: 15.7
- Airfoil: Göttingen 535; at tip, Göttingen 409
- Empty weight: 175 kg (386 lb)
- Gross weight: 280 kg (617 lb)

Performance

- Maximum glide ratio: best, 24.3:1
- Wing loading: 18.1 kg/m^{2} (3.7 lb/sq ft)
