= DFS Sperber Senior =

German single-seat glider, 1938

Sperber Senior

General information
- Type: Competition sailplane
- National origin: Germany
- Manufacturer: Deutsche Forschungsanstalt für Segelflug (DFS)
- Designer: Hans Jacobs
- Number built: 1

History
- First flight: 1936

The DFS Sperber Senior (English: Hawk Senior) was a competition sailplane designed and built in Germany in 1936. During 1937 the sole example visited the United States and scored highest in the US National Soaring Competition.

== Design and development ==
Although nominally a development of his earlier DFS Rhönsperber, Hans Jacobs' Sperber Senior was a completely new design intended to improve on the performance of its predecessor and to accommodate larger pilots. It was a shoulder wing aircraft with a double straight tapered gull wing, built around two spars and fabric covered apart from the leading edge from the front spar forward and the wing roots, which were plywood skinned. The wing roots were carefully faired into the fuselage. The inner panels, filling about one third of the span had only slight taper, the sweep entirely on the trailing edge, and about 10° of dihedral. Outboard the taper was much stronger, with a taper ratio of 0.45. Here the leading edge was slightly swept but there was no dihedral. Ailerons occupied the whole of the outer panels' trailing edges.

The Senior had a completely ply covered fuselage with a narrow ovoid cross section which was deep in the cockpit area but tapered progressively to the tail. The cockpit was just ahead of the wing, covered by a multipart glazing which, attached to a small area of the upper forward fuselage, hinged to the right for access. The rear of the canopy was above the fuselage line and a long, ply covered fairing reaching well behind the wing blended it in. A tapered, round tipped and largely fabric covered horizontal tail was mounted on top of the fuselage, far enough forward to place the trailing edges of its elevators at the rudder hinge line. The latter was mounted on a narrow ply covered fin, carefully faired into the fuselage and extending below it to form a tail bumper. The mostly fabric covered rudder was full, curved and slightly pointed, likewise extending below the fuselage. A short skid from just behind the nose to beyond mid-chord completed the landing gear.

== Operational history ==
The Sperber Senior first flew in 1936 and took part in the Rhön German National championships of that year but its pilot, Ludwig Hofmann retired for personal reasons midway through. In 1937 Peter Riedel took it to the US to participate in the 8th American National Competitions at Elmira. He finished with the highest score but, not being a US citizen was denied the title of champion. Whilst in the US he made a seven-hour flight over central New York. After he returned to Germany the Sperber Senior was retired.

== Specifications ==
Data from Sailplanes 1920-1945 (2006) pp.114-5

General characteristics

- Crew: One
- Length: 6.13 m (20 ft 1 in)
- Wingspan: 16.00 m (52 ft 6 in)
- Wing area: 16.2 m^{2} (174 sq ft)
- Aspect ratio: 15.8
- Airfoil: Göttingen 757
- Empty weight: 186 kg (410 lb)
- Gross weight: 291 kg (642 lb)

Performance

- Wing loading: 18 kg/m^{2} (3.7 lb/sq ft)
