= Schleicher Poppenhausen =

German two-seat glider

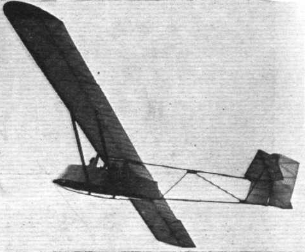

General information
- Type: Two seat trainer glider
- National origin: Germany
- Manufacturer: Alexander Schleicher
- Designer: Hans Jacobs

History
- First flight: 1928

The Schleicher Poppenhausen named after the town of Poppenhausen (which is near the Wasserkuppe where Schleicher built and flew his gliders) was a two-seat glider, available as a dual control advanced trainer, produced in Germany from 1928.

== Design and development ==
The Poppenhausen was an enlarged, tandem two-seat version of the single seat Schleicher Hols der Teufel. It was developed by Alexander Schleicher for production in his factory in the Wasserkuppe valley, though it is likely that Hans Jacobs, joint chief designer with Alexander Lippisch of the single seater was involved. The Poppenhausen first flew in 1928.

The Poppenhausen had a simple, constant-chord wing much like that of the Hols der Teufel though of 16% greater span, built around two spars and fabric covered except at the leading edge which was plywood skinned. Its broad, constant chord ailerons were longer than those of the Hols der Teufel, ending at the blunt, rounded tips. The wing was supported over the fuselage by two vertical cabane struts, one on each side of the forward cockpit and a single, vertical strut centrally behind the rear cockpit. Two faired, parallel lift struts on each side ran from the lower forward fuselage to the wing at about 40% of the span.

The Poppenhausen had a light nacelle fuselage extending well behind the wing trailing edge and ending at a forward leaning vertical knife edge. The forward cockpit was largely ahead of the leading edge and the rear one under the wing. Behind the wing the fuselage had the same flat, cross braced girder form as the Hols der Teufel, with a horizontal upper beam, its first diagonal brace within the nacelle. The tailplane was mounted on top of the horizontal beam, its leading edge straight and strongly swept. Cropped, parallel chord elevators had a central cut out for rudder movement. The fin was under the tailplane, formed by fabric covering between the last two vertical fuselage fames. Its upright, balanced, near rectangular rudder was hinged on the extended, final vertical frame member. The Poppenhausen landed on a rubber sprung skid which ran from the nose to a little beyond the aft lift struts.

== Operational history ==
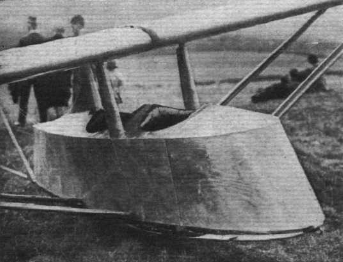

After its first flight in 1928 Schleicher used the Poppenhausen to introduce passengers to soaring flight. It then appeared in the company catalogue, significantly modified for production; it could be fitted with dual controls and used as an advanced trainer. In the early 1930s the idea that a two-seater, though over twice the price of a single seat primary glider like the Zögling, could still train pilots from the beginning sufficiently faster to be economically competitive, and safer, lay in the future.

Production numbers are hard to establish; one appeared in the UK on the BGA register, used by the London Gliding Club from 1930 to at least 1933. One was exported to Australia in 1931, though it may have been destroyed in a hangar fire before flying.

== Specifications ==
Data from Sailplanes 1920–1945 (2006)

General characteristics

- Crew: Two
- Length: 7.20 m (23 ft 7 in)
- Wingspan: 14.60 m (47 ft 11 in)
- Wing area: 22.9 m^{2} (246 sq ft)
- Aspect ratio: 9.3
- Empty weight: 150 kg (331 lb)
- Gross weight: 310 kg (683 lb)

Performance

- Maximum glide ratio: best, 16.4
- Rate of sink: 0.88 m/s (173 ft/min) minimum
- Wing loading: 13.5 kg/m^{2} (2.8 lb/sq ft)
