= DFS Seeadler =

German flying boat sailplane, 1936

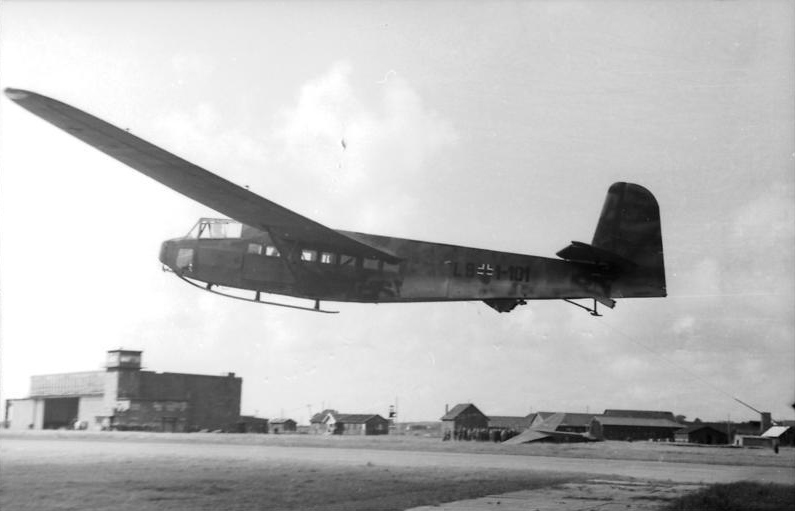
- Cargo glider DFS 230 during landing, Italy

General information
- Type: Flying boat sailplane
- National origin: Germany
- Manufacturer: Deutsche Forschungsanstalt für Segelflug
- Designer: Hans Jacobs

History
- First flight: 12 November 1936

The DFS Seeadler (Sea Eagle) was a German flying boat sailplane designed by Hans Jacobs of the Deutsche Forschungsanstalt für Segelflug (DFS). It was version of the 1935 DFS Rhönadler, with a new fuselage and strongly gulled wings to keep them clear from spray. The aircraft was first flown in the summer of 1935, test piloted by Hanna Reitsch, and towed by a Dornier Do 12.

== Specifications ==
Data from Die deutschen Flugboote : Flugboote, Amphibien-Flugboote u. Projekte von 1909 bis zur Gegenwart, Flugzeug-Typenbuch. Handbuch der deutschen Luftfahrt- und Zubehör-Industrie 1944

General characteristics

- Crew: one
- Capacity: 85 kg (187 lb)
- Length: 7.42 m (24 ft 4 in)
- Wingspan: 17.36 m (56 ft 11 in)
- Height: 2.21 m (7 ft 3 in)
- Wing area: 18 m^{2} (190 sq ft)
- Aspect ratio: 16.75
- Airfoil: root: Göttingen 652; tip: Göttingen 535
- Empty weight: 240 kg (529 lb)
- Gross weight: 325 kg (717 lb)

Performance

- Never exceed speed: 140 km/h (87 mph, 76 kn)
- Maximum glide ratio: 20:1
- Rate of sink: 0.8 m/s (160 ft/min)
- Wing loading: 18 kg/m^{2} (3.7 lb/sq ft)
