= Schleicher Rhönadler =

German single-seat glider, 1932

Rhönadler
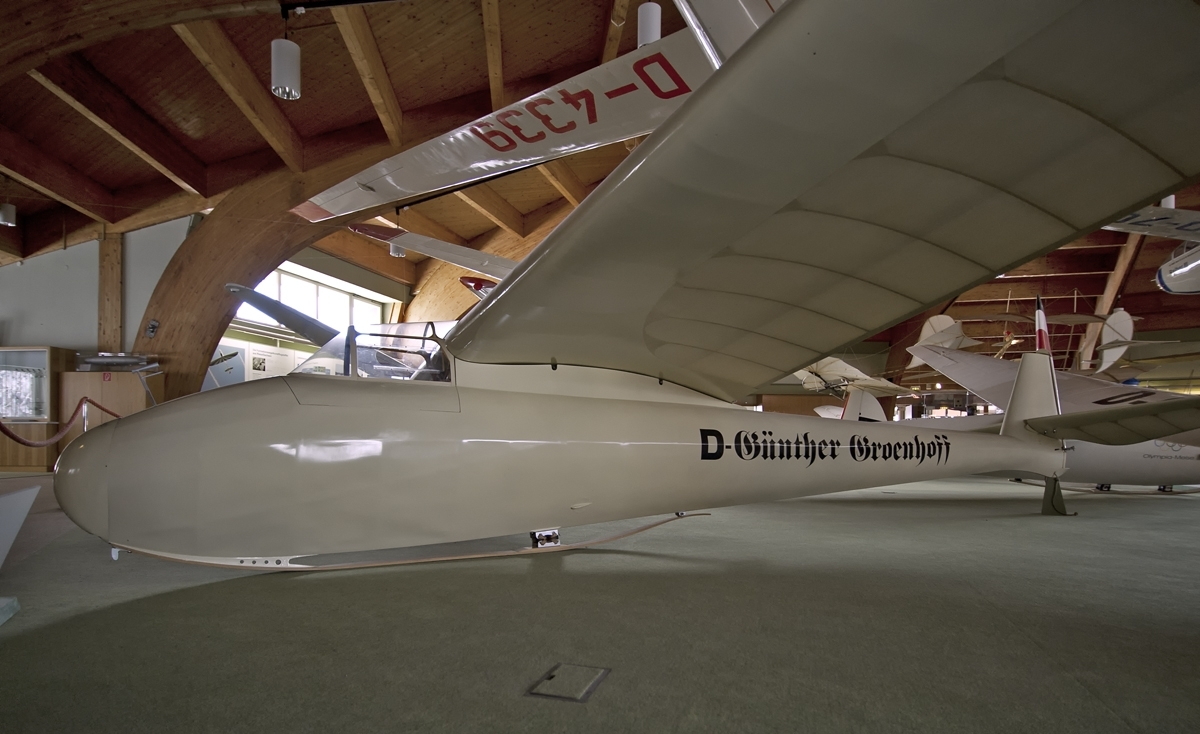
- A Rhönadler in The German Gliding Museum

General information
- Type: Single seat competition glider
- National origin: Germany
- Manufacturer: Alexander Schleicher GmbH & Co
- Designer: Hans Jacobs
- Number built: (Rhönadler 35) 65

History
- First flight: 1932

The Schleicher Rhönadler, DFS Rhönadler or Jacobs Rhönadler is a high performance, single seat competition sailplane built in Germany in the 1930s. (Note: The Schleicher K7, a 1960s two seat glider training glider, is also named Rhönadler: it is a completely independent design from another designer. There was yet another Rhönadler, a record setting two seat glider dating from before the 1932 design.) More than 65 were built.

== Design and development ==
About 1931 the glider manufacturer Alexander Schleicher went to Hans Jacobs, then at the RRG (Rhön-Rossitten Gesellschaft) on the Wasserkuppe, for a glider design that, like the RRG Fafnir designed by Alexander Lippisch, would be capable of making long cross country flights by travelling quickly between thermals but could be put into series production making it cheaper to build. Jacobs responded with the Rhönadler (in English, Rhön eagle), ready for the 1932 Rhön competition. The following year both Jacobs and Lippisch had to transfer to the state owned DFS (Deutsche Forschungsanstalt Für Segelflug) at Darmstadt, where Jacobs continued to refine the Rhönbussard, hence the DFS Rhönadler name.

The Rhönadler was a wood-framed aircraft with plywood and fabric covering. In plan its high wing wings were straight tapered with a torsion-resisting D-box formed by ply skin ahead of the single spar. Aft of the spar the wings were fabric covered. The Rhönadler wing root used a version of the thick Göttingen 652 section, modified by a reduction of its high camber; further outboard this turned into the progressively lower camber Göttingen 535 and Clark Y airfoils. Dihedral was constant, to avoid the constructional complication of the Fafnir's gull wing. The ailerons were very long, occupying more than half the span. Though neither the prototype nor later production aircraft came with spoilers or airbrakes such devices, opening above the wing, were often retro-fitted.

The Rhönadler's fuselage was quite slender and entirely ply covered, including the fin, the balancing part of the rudder and a small tail bumper. On the original version, even the cockpit canopy was a ply structure, with small, unglazed apertures for vision. This was progressively modified with increasing glazing into the 1935 variant's multi-framed conventional canopy. To avoid the wing root aerodynamic interference that the Fafnir's gull wing was intended to avoid, the Rhönadler's wing was mounted just above the fuselage on a low, narrow neck or pedestal which placed the leading edge level with the top of the canopy. The high aspect ratio, all-moving horizontal tail was of similar construction to the wing, with most of the taper on the trailing edge where there was a deep cut-out at the root. The tailplane was low set on the prototype but raised just above the dorsal fuselage line on production aircraft. The broad chord, balanced rudder was also fabric covered. Landings were made on a sprung skid.

== Operational history ==
At the 1932 Rhön the Rhönadler, flown by Peter Riedel, did not win but impressed enough to go into series production as the Rhönadler 32, with the prototype's wing span slightly shortened, its vertical tail leading edge smoothed by a shorter rudder balance and its tailplane raised. This sold well, though production numbers are uncertain. The 1935 version's alterations included a fully enclosed transparent canopy. Schleicher built sixty-five of them, making it the top selling German high performance glider; several were exported. A measure of the popularity of the Rhönadler is the number at the 1935 Rhön competition, twenty-three out of sixty contestants.

In the 1980s a new Rhönadler was built from original plans and flown. It is now in the Wasserkuppe museum.

== Variants ==
Rhönadler
Prototype. Competed in the 1932 Rhön event. 18 m (59 ft 1 in) span. Ply fairing over cockpit with small oval openings for vision.
Rhönadler 32
First production version, with raised tailplane and simplified fin and rudder. Span reduced by 542 mm (21.3 in). Transparencies at the front of the cockpit.
Rhönadler 35
Second production version with full cockpit transparencies.
Seeadler
Flying boat version with hull, markedly gulled wings and underwing stabilizing floats.

== Aircraft on display ==
- Deutsches Segelflugmuseum mit Modellflug, Wasserkuppe:1980s built Rhönadler 35.

== Specifications (35) ==
Data from Die berümtesten Segelflugzeuge

General characteristics

- Crew: One
- Length: 7.20 m (23 ft 7 in)
- Wingspan: 17.40 m (57 ft 1 in)
- Wing area: 18.0 m^{2} (194 sq ft)
- Aspect ratio: 16.8
- Airfoil: Root: modified Göttingen 652; mid-span: Göttingen 535; tip: Clark Y
- Empty weight: 170 kg (375 lb)
- Gross weight: 250 kg (551 lb)

Performance

- Maximum speed: 130 km/h (81 mph, 70 kn)
- Stall speed: 50 km/h (31 mph, 27 kn)
- Maximum glide ratio: 20:1
- Rate of sink: 0.75 m/s (148 ft/min) minimum
- Wing loading: 13.6 kg/m^{2} (2.8 lb/sq ft)
