= DFS 332 =

German experimental aircraft, 1945

General information
- Type: Experimental aircraft
- National origin: Germany
- Manufacturer: DFS
- Status: Experimental
- Number built: 2

History
- First flight: 14 February 1945

The DFS 332 was an experimental aircraft, built by the Deutsche Forschungsanstalt für Segelflug (DFS).

== Development ==
It was designed to evaluate new wing profiles in flight. For this purpose, the DFS 332 was given twin fuselages, of a long and slender shape with flat sides. The front of the left fuselage contained a cockpit for the pilot, and the right fuselage a seat for an engineer who would operate the measurement instrumentation. The wing section to study would be attached between the fuselages, with fittings that allowed an easy exchange. The short outer wing panels were fixed, with slightly swept leading edges and straight trailing edges with full-span ailerons. Each fuselage had its own tailfin, with a tailplane and elevator between them.

The DFS 332 was a glider, a configuration that presumably had advantages for aerodynamic testing because the airflow over the wing would not be disturbed by a propeller. The design of the fuselages, with flat wall sides and noses that extended well in front of the wing, must also have been chosen to achieve undisturbed flow over the test section.

After being towed to altitude, the crew would make a series of dives at different speeds. However, to be able to perform tests at higher speeds, the aircraft was also fitted with two Walter HWK-R II/203 rocket engines, delivering 750 kg of thrust each. They were installed in the fuselages with rocket nozzles under the lower fuselage, aligned 10 degrees down.

== Operational history ==
The only documented flight of the DFS 332 occurred on 14 February 1945, when the second prototype was towed behind a Heinkel He 111. It probably it never made any free flights or fired its engines. Although construction of the first prototype was completed in November 1944, it is not known to have been flown, perhaps because the rocket engines were not installed. The end of the war also ended the career of the aircraft.

== Specifications ==
General characteristics

- Crew: 2
- Length: 12.25 m (40 ft 2 in)
- Wingspan: 15.20 m (49 ft 10 in)
- Powerplant: 2 × Walter HWK-R II/203 , 7.35 kN (1,650 lbf) thrust each

Performance
