= DFS Rhönsperber =

German single seat competition glider, 1937

Rhönsperber
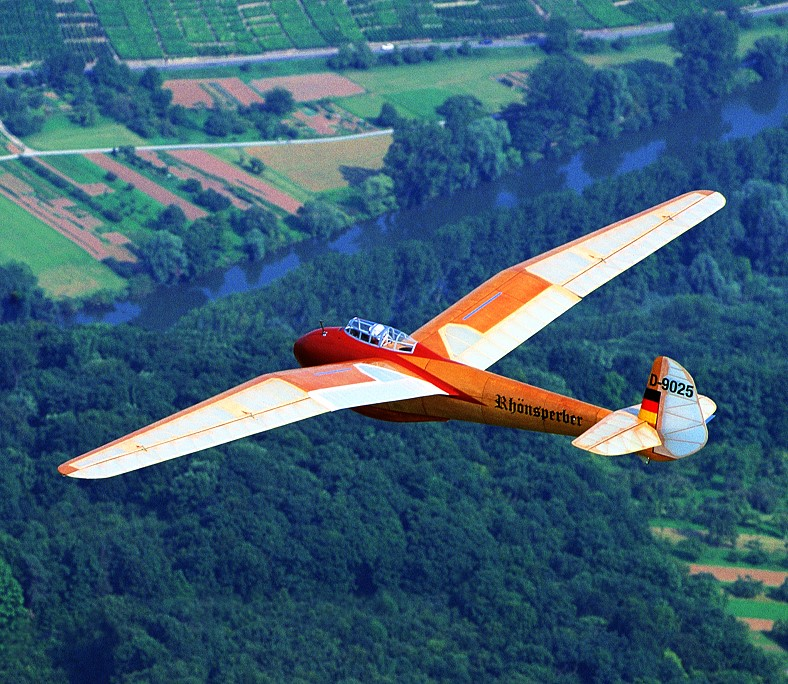
- Rhönsperber replica, built 1997

General information
- Type: Single seat competition glider
- National origin: Germany
- Manufacturer: Flugzeubau Schweyer
- Designer: Hans Jacobs
- Number built: c.100

History
- First flight: 1935

The DFS Rhönsperber, otherwise known as the Schweyer Rhönsperber or Jacobs Rhönsperber (in English Rhön Sparrowhawk) was a single seat competition glider designed in Germany by Hans Jacobs and first flown in 1935. For several years it was regarded as the best German sailplane and about one hundred were built.

== Design and development ==
In 1935, Hans Jacobs was asked by Alexander Lippisch to become chief designer of sailplanes at DFS (Deutsche Forschungsanstalt Für Segelflug) at Darmstadt, after the closure the RRG (Rhön-Rossitten Gesellschaft) at the Wasserkuppe in 1933. The Rhönsperber was not unlike his earlier Rhönbussard, but was enlarged all round, with a repositioned wing and an enclosed cockpit. With a greater aspect ratio, its performance was better. For a few years after its first flight in 1935, the Rhönsperber was held to be the best German competition sailplane.

The Rhönbussard had its wing over the cockpit, limiting the pilot's view, but on the Rhönsperber it was lowered to mid fuselage. It is an entirely wood and fabric aircraft with a wing built around a single spar. Forward of the spar the wing is plywood covered around the leading edge, forming a torsion-resisting D-box. Aft of the spar, the covering is fabric. Each wing has two sections, a parallel-chord centre section and a double straight tapered outer panel, ending with semi-elliptical tips. The only dihedral, 5°, is on the centre section, forming the gull wing. Airbrakes are centrally placed on the upper centre section surface and fabric-covered ailerons fill the trailing edges of the outer panels.

The fuselage is ply covered and of teardrop cross section, deep around the generously dimensioned cockpit. The canopy is multi-framed with a rather upright windscreen; the fixed glazing extends rearwards to mid wing and the forward section, including the screen, instruments and a small surrounding portion of the fuselage, hinges to starboard for access. The narrow fin is also ply covered but the rest of the empennage is fabric over wood framing. The rudder, like the fin, is straight tapered with a rounded tip; it extends down to the keel. A straight tapered tailplane and elevators are placed on top of the fuselage, the elevators having a cut-out for rudder movement. The Rhönsperber has no landing wheel, only a curved main skid reaching from the nose to behind mid-chord, and an integral, pronounced tail bumper.

Since the DFS built only prototypes, construction of the Rhönsperber was undertaken by Flugzeugbau Schweyer at Ludwigshafen who produced about one hundred.

== Operational history ==
One notable flight set, albeit briefly, a new world distance record of 474 km (296 mi). Flown by Ludwig Hofmann in 1935, this was the first glider flight over more than 400 km (250 mi). Another glider world record was set in 1937, when Paul Steinig reached an altitude of 6,200 m (18,898 ft).

The first sailplane crossing of the Alps was flown by Heini Dittmar in 1936. Another well-known aviator, Ernst Udet had his own Rhönsperber, which he once flew from the Jungfraujoch in 1935. The following year Peter Riedel gave demonstrations of glider aerobatics at the Winter Olympics, taking off and landing on ice. Hanna Reitsch also put a Rhönsperber through some vigorous aerobatics, reaching 385 km/h (240 mph) in a dive and losing 1,920 m (6,300 ft) in a forty-two turn, 165 second spin. There were many competition successes.

The type was marketed in the U.S. by Emil Lehecka, who imported one for his participation in the US Annual National Soaring Contest in 1937.

A single Rhönsperber (civilian registration NC17898) was impressed into USAAF service under the designation TG-19 (s/n 42-57165).

A Rhönsperber (BGA260), flying with a Rhönbussard empennage which has a more angular horizontal tail, is still active in the U.K. as of 2018.

It is based at the London Gliding Club, Dunstable, and is regularly flown on vintage glider days.

A "perfect" Rhönsperber replica, built by Otto Grau in 1997, remained on the German civil aircraft register in 2010.

== Aircraft on display ==
- Muzeum Lotnictwa Polskiego, Kraków: Rhönsperber SP-148

== Specifications ==
Data from Die berümtesten Segelflugzeuge

General characteristics

- Crew: One
- Length: 6.05 m (19 ft 10 in)
- Wingspan: 15.30 m (50 ft 2 in)
- Wing area: 15.10 m^{2} (162.5 sq ft)
- Aspect ratio: 15.30
- Airfoil: centre section Göttingen 535, Göttingen 409 at tip
- Empty weight: 162 kg (357 lb)
- Gross weight: 255 kg (562 lb)

Performance

- Maximum speed: 200 km/h (120 mph, 110 kn)
- Stall speed: 60 km/h (37 mph, 32 kn)
- Maximum glide ratio: 20:1 at 58 km/h (36 mph; 31 kn)
- Rate of sink: 0.72 m/s (142 ft/min) at 58 km/h (36 mph; 31 kn)
- Wing loading: 16.90 kg/m^{2} (3.46 lb/sq ft)

== See also ==
Related lists

- List of gliders
