= DFS Reiher =

German single-seat glider, 1937

Reiher
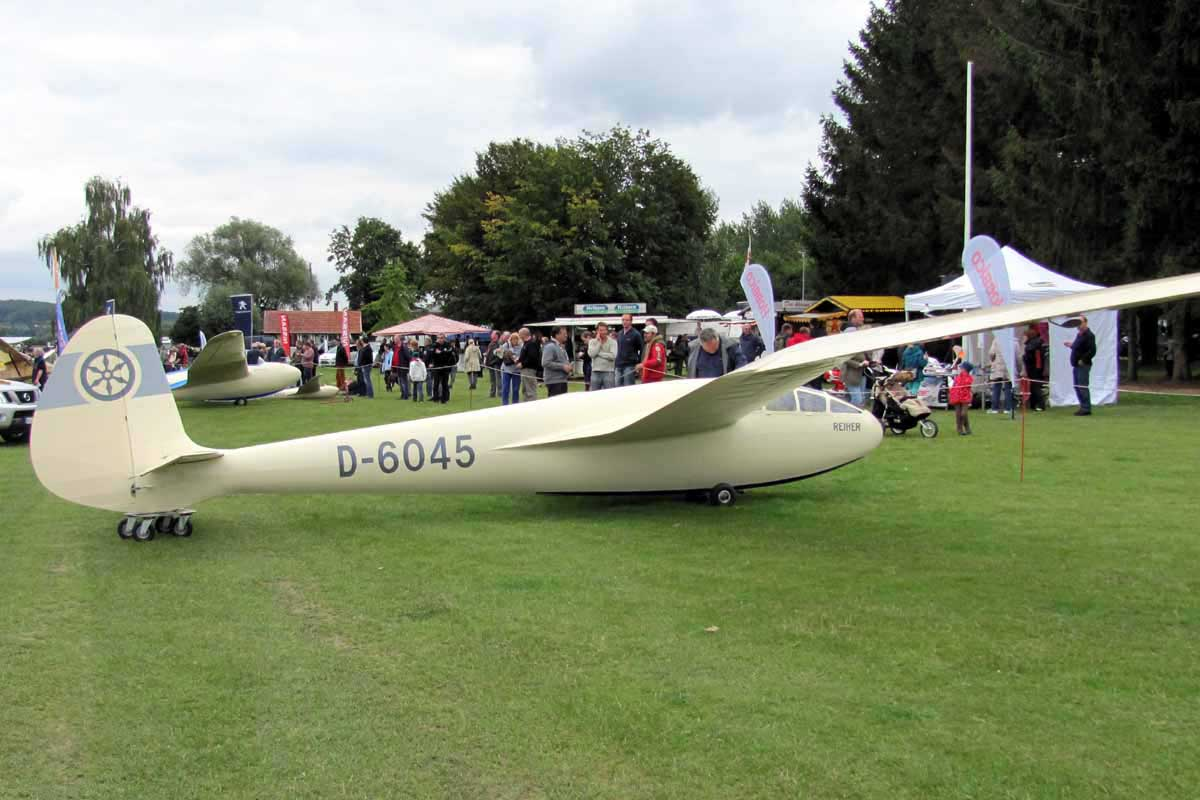
- Reiher III reproduction, first flown 2009

General information
- Type: Single seat competition glider
- National origin: Germany
- Designer: Hans Jacobs
- Number built: at least 7

History
- First flight: 1937

The DFS Reiher (in English Heron) was a single seat competition glider designed in Germany by Hans Jacobs and first flown in 1937. The type won the last two German Rhön gliding championships before the start of World War II. Six were factory produced.

== Design and development ==
In 1935 Hans Jacobs had been asked by Alexander Lippisch to become chief designer of sailplanes at the nationalised Deutsche Forschungsanstalt für Segelflug (DFS) at Darmstadt, after the closure of the RRG (Rhön-Rossitten Gesellschaft) on the Wasserkuppe in 1933. In 1936 there was more recognition of the need for fast gliders with high wing loading and low camber to fare better in competitions by moving quickly between strong thermals; the hope was that camber-changing flaps would enhance lift in the climb. The Reiher was Jacobs' attempt to build these qualities into a new sailplane, using all the DFS design and prototype production facilities and skills.

It was an all-wood aircraft with a mid-mounted cantilever gull wing, the wing position chosen to simplify the blending of the wing root into the fuselage. This fairing was most noticeable on the trailing edge. The wing was divided into three sections, a centre part which had a full span of about 12 m (39 ft 4 in) and strong (10°) dihedral and two outer sections with no dihedral. In plan it was doubly straight tapered, though mostly on the trailing edge, ending in semi-elliptical tips. The wing was built around a single, narrow, 188 mm (7.4 in) high spar of spruce, rather than the more usual, but heavier pine, which was part of a torsion-resisting D-box formed by the plywood skin forward of it and around the leading edge. The plywood skin continued aft, though the trailing edge and ailerons were fabric covered. Airbrakes were fitted at mid-chord on the innermost position on the outer panels, opening both above and below the wing but unusual in having a longer span lower blade. Camber changing flaps were mounted on the centre section.

All of the fuselage and empennage apart from the rear control surfaces was ply skinned. The forward cross section was minimised with a long, low canopy, which extended from the nose to beyond the leading edge; limited by the plastics technology of the time, the Reiher's canopy was made from twelve separate framed sections. Aft, the fuselage became slim close to the fin and full rudder. The straight tapered horizontal tail was mounted on top of the fuselage, far enough forward that only a small notch between the elevators was needed for rudder movement.

The first real tests of the Reiher came from Hanna Reitsch's experiences with it at the 1937 International Championships at the famous Wasserkuppe glider field in the Rhön Mountains, which revealed worrying wing flexure, heavy ailerons and unpredictable airbrakes. In response, Jacobs revised the design to that of the Reiher II, which had more tapered wings, no flaps, airbrakes as described above and mass balanced ailerons. The fuselage was further refined and the fin and rudder increased in area. Much improved, Reiher IIs were factory built in a short production series, followed by the further developed Reiher III.

== Operational history ==
Despite the problems encountered at the Rhön competition with the Reiher prototype in 1937, Reitsch managed to fly into sixth place. In the process she set on 4 July 1937 a Germans women's distance record of 349 km (217 mi) which stood until 1968. In 1938 the prototype, stiffened and heavier, was flown into first place by Wolfgang Späte in the same event and in 1939 the Reiher III won there in the hands of Erwin Kraft. Six Reiher competed in 1939, the 20th Rhön competition and the last before World War II.

No Reiher survived the war. In the 1990s the Wasserkuppe Old Timers Group built a faithful replica, which is now the museum there. A second reproduction Reiher III first flew in 2009.

== Variants ==
Reiher I
Prototype D-11-95. Later, stiffened and heavier, it won the 1938 Rhön German national competition, flown by Wolfgang Späte.
Reiher II
Wing, fuselage and vertical tail revisions. Small series production.
Reiher III
Further improvements including stiffening, lightening and ballast provision. 1939 Rhön German national competition winner, flown by Erwin Kraft.

== Aircraft on display ==
- Deutsches Segelflugmuseum mit Modellflug, Wasserkuppe: Replica Reiher 3, D-7033.

== Specifications ==
Data from Die berühmtesten Segelflugzeuge

General characteristics

- Crew: One
- Length: 7.76 m (25 ft 6 in)
- Wingspan: 19.00 m (62 ft 4 in)
- Height: 2.28 m (7 ft 6 in)
- Wing area: 19.36 m^{2} (208.4 sq ft)
- Aspect ratio: 18.85
- Airfoil: Göttingen 549 to 60% of span, Göttingen 676 outboard
- Empty weight: 230 kg (507 lb)
- Gross weight: 315 kg (694 lb)

Performance

- Maximum speed: 200 km/h (120 mph, 110 kn)
- Stall speed: 60 km/h (37 mph, 32 kn)
- Maximum glide ratio: 33:1
- Rate of sink: 0.50 m/s (98 ft/min)
- Wing loading: 16.44 kg/m^{2} (3.37 lb/sq ft)

== See also ==
Related lists

- List of gliders
