= Hans Jacobs =

German sailplane designer and pioneer

- Born: 30 April 1907; Hamburg, Germany
- Died: 24 October 1994 (aged 87)

Hans Jacobs (30 April 1907 in Hamburg – 24 October 1994) was a German sailplane designer and pioneer. He had been taught sailplane design by Alexander Lippisch, designer of many gliders during the 1920s and the 1930s. As the head of the Deutsche Forschungsanstalt für Segelflug (DFS - German Research Institute for Sailplane Flight) at Darmstadt in the years before World War II, he was responsible for a number of highly successful designs, including the DFS Rhönsperber, DFS Rhönadler, DFS Habicht, DFS Weihe, DFS Kranich, and the DFS 230 assault glider. Hans also designed a glider-seaplane, the "Sea Eagle", test flown by Hanna Reitsch. In 1936, Hans developed self-operating dive brakes, on the upper and lower surface of each wing, for gliders. He designed the DFS 230 used in the Battle of Fort Eben-Emael.

The DFS Olympia Meise was selected in 1939 as the glider for the 1940 Summer Olympics, but the games were cancelled. The design was taken up after the war and produced in large numbers in the UK by Elliotts of Newbury, in France by Nord Aviation, in the Netherlands and in Switzerland.

When the prohibition on German aviation under the Allied occupation ended in 1951, Jacobs designed and marketed a significantly different, updated version of the Kranich.

In 1932 Jacobs authored a seminal work on sailplane design, Werkstattpraxis für den Bau von Gleit- und Segelflugzeugen ("Workshop Practice for the Construction of Gliders and Sailplanes"). Updated in several editions, this "became and remains the standard work" on the construction of wooden gliders. In July 2016 the Vintage Sailplane Association published an English translation of this work.

== Jacob's glider designs ==
From Sailplanes 1920-1945

Hols der Teufel (1928-9)
Poppenhausen (1929)
Rhönadler (1932)
Rhönbussard (1933)
Rhönsperber (1935)
Kranich (1935)
Sperber Senior (1936)
Sperber Junior (1936)
Habicht (1936)
Seeadler (1936)
Reiher (1937)
DFS 230 (1937)
Weihe (1938)
Meise (Olympia) (1939)
DFS 331 (1942)
Kranich 3 (1952)
