= DFS 193 =

German tailless aircraft proposal

General information
- Type: Unbuilt and unflown experimental aircraft
- National origin: Germany
- Manufacturer: Deutsche Forschungsanstalt für Segelflug

The DFS 193 was a planned experimental German aircraft of the 1930s planned by Deutsche Forschungsanstalt für Segelflug (DFS). Designed by Professor Alexander Lippisch and a DFS employee named Roth, it resembled Lippisch's Storch IX and the Gotha Go 147.

== Design and development ==
The DFS 193 was a two-seat tailless aircraft designed to explore the military potential of this layout. It was powered by an Argus As 10 C, of 240 hp (179 kW). Although a mockup was tested in a wind tunnel in 1936, it was abandoned in 1938 because it did not show any improvement over traditional designs. The aircraft was therefore never built.

== Specifications ==
Data from The Delta Wing: History and Development

General characteristics

- Crew: two
- Length: 5.97 m (19 ft 7 in)
- Wingspan: 11.06 m (36 ft 3 in)
- Height: 3.1 m (10 ft 2 in)
- Wing area: 17.08 m^{2} (183.8 sq ft)
- Empty weight: 750 kg (1,653 lb)
- Max takeoff weight: 1,065 kg (2,348 lb)
- Powerplant: 1 × Argus As 10 C 8-cylinder, air-cooled, 90° inverted Vee piston aircraft engine, 180 kW (240 hp)
