= Akaflieg Stuttgart fs18 =

German single-seat glider, 1938

Akaflieg Stuttgart fs18a

General information
- Type: Glider aircraft
- National origin: Nazi Germany
- Manufacturer: Akaflieg Stuttgart
- Number built: 1

History
- First flight: 21 July 1938

The Akaflieg Stuttgart fs18a was a glider designed and built in Germany from 1938. It was characterized by a gull wing and was the first glider to have a retractable undercarriage. Only one example of the design was constructed.

== Development ==
With the experience gained from the Rhön gliding competitions, the students at Akaflieg Stuttgart (Akademische Fliegergruppe – academic flying group) designed the fs18, which was able to turn tightly in thermals and had a relatively low sink rate, over the six months preceding the next Rhön competition at Wasserkuppe. The result was the fs18 which was a high-wing cantilever monoplane with gulled centre section, to ensure that the wings joined the fuselage at 90 degrees, rectangular midsection and tapered outer section. Flaps were fitted to the trailing edge of the midsection to 30% chord, and ailerons were mounted on the trailing edges of the outer wing sections. The fuselage consisted of the cockpit pod smoothly narrowing to a boom-like rear fuselage supporting the tail unit. The main undercarriage was manually retractable into an enclosed wheel well behind the cockpit. After the first flight on 21 July 1938, testing of the fs18a continued until 7 December 1938 when the fs18 crashed, killing pilot Ernst Scheible.

== Specifications ==
Data from Flugzeug-Typenbuch. Handbuch der deutschen Luftfahrt- und Zubehör-Industrie 1944

General characteristics

- Crew: 1
- Length: 7.1 m (23 ft 4 in)
- Wingspan: 18 m (59 ft 1 in)
- Height: 1.15 m (3 ft 9 in)
- Wing area: 18 m^{2} (190 sq ft)
- Length de-rigged: 10 m (33 ft)
- Width de-rigged (without tailplane): 1 m (3 ft 3 in)
- Width de-rigged (with tailplane): 2.5 m (8 ft 2 in)
- Height de-rigged: 1.25 m (4 ft 1 in)
- Aspect ratio: 18
- Airfoil: root: NACA 43015; mid-span: NACA 43012; tip: NACA 0012
- Empty weight: 200 kg (441 lb)
- Gross weight: 300 kg (661 lb)

Performance

- g limits: +8 (ultimate)
- Maximum glide ratio: 30 at 70 km/h (43 mph; 38 kn)
- Rate of sink: 0.53 m/s (104 ft/min) at 50 km/h (31 mph; 27 kn)
- Wing loading: 16.68 kg/m^{2} (3.42 lb/sq ft)

== See also ==
Aircraft of comparable role, configuration, and era

- DFS Weihe

Related lists

- List of gliders
