= Schleicher Rhönbussard =

German training glider, 1933

Rhönbussard
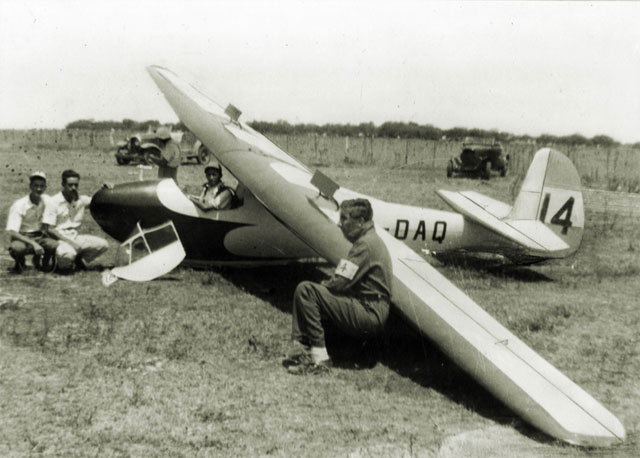
- A Rhönbussard getting ready for flight in Argentina

General information
- Type: Single seat competition and training glider
- National origin: Germany
- Manufacturer: Alexander Schleicher GmbH & Co
- Designer: Hans Jacobs
- Number built: 200+

History
- First flight: 1933

The Schleicher Rhönbussard, otherwise known as the DFS Rhönbussard was intended as an intermediate glider trainer which could also fly competitively. It was designed by Hans Jacobs in Germany in the early 1930s. More than 200 were built.

== Design and development ==
By the early 1930s, a large performance, size, and cost gap had been opened between the kind of glider in which people learned to soar and make cross country flights, like the Grunau Baby, and the best sailplanes like the Schleicher Rhönadler. In 1932, the glider manufacturer Alexander Schleicher went to Hans Jacobs, then at the RRG (Rhön-Rossitten Gesellschaft) on the Wasserkuppe, to seek a design for a glider more advanced than the Baby but smaller, cheaper and easier to fly than Jacobs' Rhönadler. The result was the Rhönbussard (in English, the Rhön Buzzard). Since it was later produced at the Schleicher works, it is often attributed to them but, in 1933, the RRG was replaced by the state owned DFS (Deutsche Forschungsanstalt für Segelflug) at Darmstadt, to which Jacobs moved and continued to refine the Rhönbussard, hence the alternative name.

The Rhönbussard is an all wood and fabric aircraft, with a span 1.43 m (4 ft 8 in) greater than the Grunau Baby 1, a wing loading 50% higher and considerably more refined aerodynamically, with a cantilever wing and a smooth, oval section fuselage. The wing, lacking dihedral, has a parallel chord centre section and straight tapered outer panels ending in semi-elliptical tips. It is built around a single spar with plywood covering forward to form a torsion resisting D-box. Behind the spar the wing is fabric covered. The whole span of the trailing edge of the outer panels carries ailerons. The earliest Rhönbussards had no lift losing or drag increasing surfaces but later examples followed the development of these at the DFS: first with spoilers deployed above the upper wing surface, then with DFS-type airbrakes rotating out of both surfaces on a common span-wise axis at about mid-chord and finally with parallel ruler action Schempp-Hirth brakes mounted just behind the spar.

The wing is mounted on a low pedestal, faired aft into the main fuselage. This is slightly shorter than that of the Baby and for centre of gravity reasons the Rhönbussard's open cockpit is under the leading edge of the wing, restricting the pilot's upward and rear view. The fuselage tapers to the rear and is ply covered all over apart from a metal nose cone, including the fin and tail bumper. The fin is narrow and straight edged but the fabric covered rudder, extending down to the keel, is full and more rounded. The fabric covered, straight tapered and square tipped horizontal tail is placed on top of the fuselage, with its trailing edge forward of the rudder hinge. The Rhönbussard took off on a jettisonable two wheeled dolly, leaving a long skid for landing.

The Rhönbussard first flew in 1933.

== Operational history ==
As intended, the Rhönbussard proved popular, providing good performance at a moderate cost, and more than two hundred were built by Schleicher. Sixteen of them competed at the 15th Rhön International meeting in 1934, where they were only outnumbered by Grunau Babys. Two years later at the same meeting Eugen Wagner managed a 325 km (202 mi) flight and many other flights of 200–300 km (120–190 mi) were made over the years. At competitions, it regularly did well.

One Rhönbussard almost set a sailplane world altitude record in 1936. Piloted by Hermann Seeler, it reached more than 5,000 m (16,000 ft), but he lost control in cloud and the aircraft broke up. Seeler escaped by parachute but his sealed barometer was not so fortunate, leaving his feat unrecorded. Despite this failure, the Rhönbussard's structure was strong and the type was used by several pioneers of glider aerobatics in displays.

Three Rhönbussards remained on European civil aircraft registers in 2010, two in Germany and one in Belgium. One of the German aircraft had at one time served with the Royal Air Force under civil registration.

== Aircraft on display ==
- Deutsches Segelflugmuseum mit Modellflug, Wasserkuppe: Rhönbussard.

== Specifications ==
Data from Die Beruhmtesten Segelflugzeuge

General characteristics

- Crew: One
- Length: 5.80 m (19 ft 0 in)
- Wingspan: 14.30 m (46 ft 11 in)
- Wing area: 14.10 m^{2} (151.8 sq ft)
- Aspect ratio: 14.50
- Airfoil: Göttingen 535
- Empty weight: 150 kg (331 lb)
- Gross weight: 245 kg (540 lb)

Performance

- Stall speed: 50 km/h (31 mph, 27 kn)
- Never exceed speed: 130 km/h (81 mph, 70 kn)
- Maximum glide ratio: 19.8:1
- Rate of sink: 0.75 m/s (148 ft/min)
- Wing loading: 17.4 kg/m^{2} (3.6 lb/sq ft)
