= DFS Habicht =

German single-seat aerobatic glider, 1936

Habicht
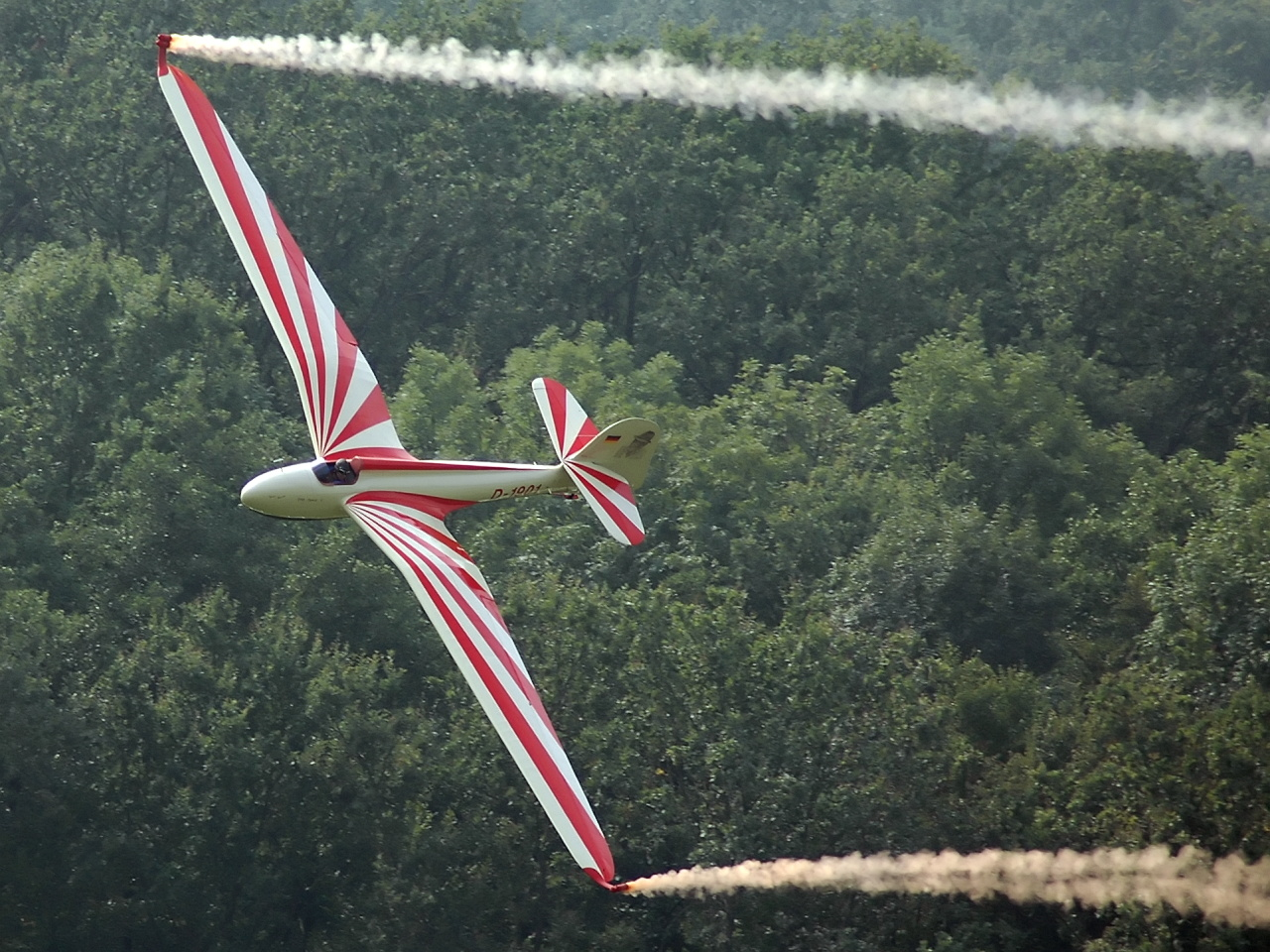
- Christopher Zahn's Habicht replica

General information
- Type: Aerobatic sailplane
- Manufacturer: DFS
- Designer: Hans Jacobs

History
- First flight: 1936

The DFS Habicht (German: "Hawk") is an unlimited aerobatic sailplane that was designed in 1936 by Hans Jacobs with support provided by the Deutsche Forschungsanstalt für Segelflug. Four planes were made available for the Olympic Games of 1936, where the maneuvers of the Habicht over and literally inside the Olympic stadium enthralled spectators.

The flight qualities of the Habicht were praised by pilots, including Hanna Reitsch. It participated in many airshows abroad before the war, including the 1938 National Air Races in Cleveland, Ohio.

Modified versions of the Habicht, dubbed the Stummel-Habicht ("Stumpy Hawk"), were used to train pilots to fly the Messerschmitt Me 163 Komet rocket-powered fighter. Trainees included students from the Hitler Youth Glider Schools. The Me 163 was designed to use its entire load of rocket fuel to reach combat altitude of approximately 10,000 metres (33,000 ft), before returning to land as a fast glider. Trainees therefore began on a Stummel-Habicht, in which the original 14 metres (46 ft) wingspan, was modified to one having an 8 metres (26 ft) wingspan, and another having an 6 metres (20 ft) wingspan. The shorter wingspan closely mimicked the ME 163 handling characteristics.

Few Habichts survived World War II. There is one craft, flown by famous French aerobatic pilot Marcel Doret, in the Musée de l'Air et de l'Espace in Paris. Another, with the registration D-8002, flew in Southern Germany until it was destroyed by the collapse of the hangar wherein it was stored. Apart from these original examples, Türk Hava Kurumu manufactured six reverse-engineered copies of the Habicht as the THK-3 in 1945-1946.

After lengthy and patient research to recover the design documentation, Josef Kurz and other members of the Oldtimer Segelflugclub Wasserkuppe built an all-new Habicht. After an extended exhibition career, this exemplar, registered also as D-8002, flies from the Wasserkuppe club's airfield.

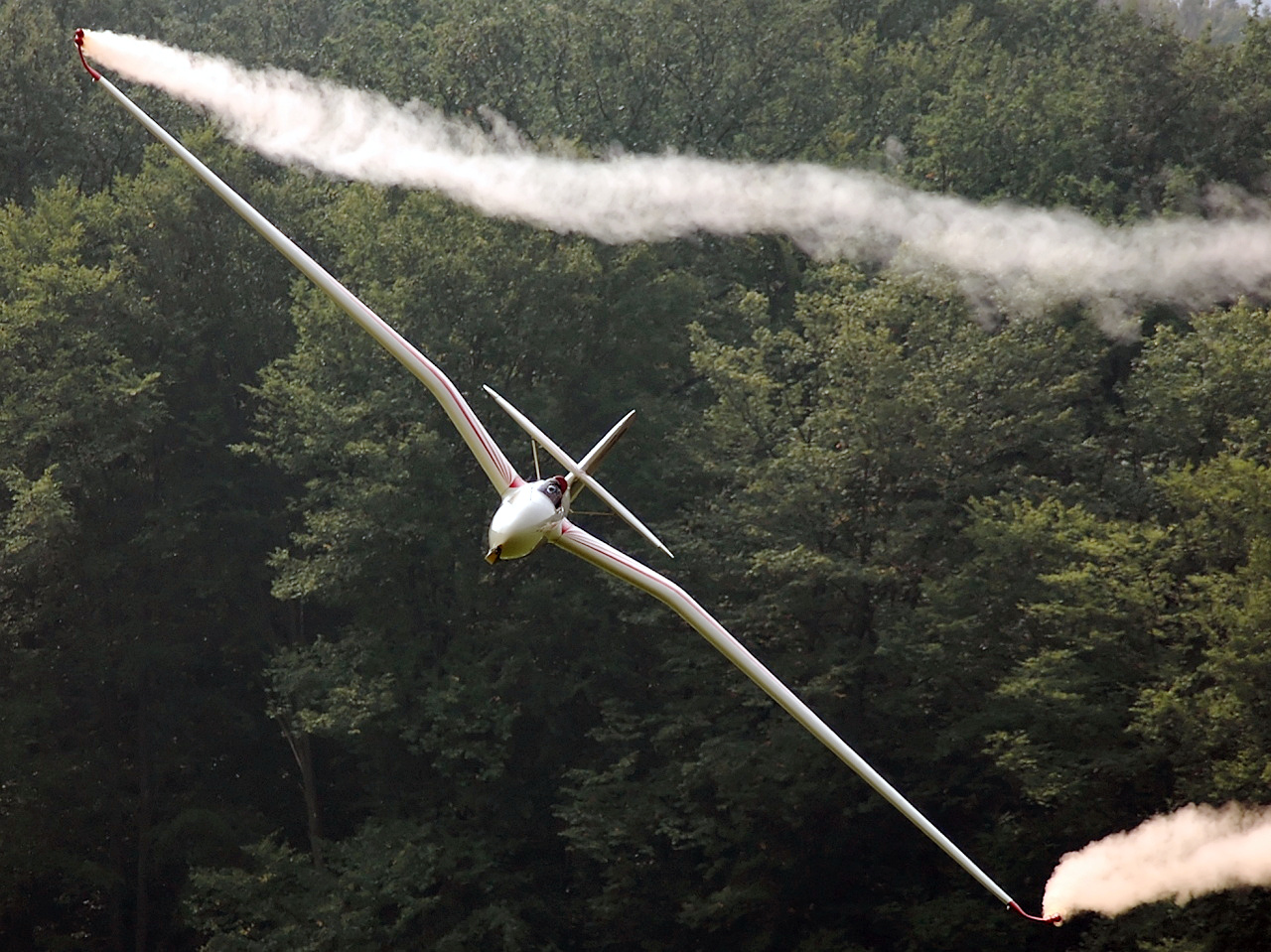

Another airworthy Habicht was built by the Zahn family and first flew in 2001. Since then, at the hands of pilot Christoph Zahn, it has provided aerobatics demonstrations at numerous air shows.

== Operators ==
Austria

- Austrian Air Force (1927–1938)

== Specifications ==
General characteristics

- Crew: One pilot
- Length: 6.58 m (21 ft 7 in)
- Wingspan: 13.60 m (44 ft 7 in)
- Wing area: 15.8 m^{2} (170 sq ft)
- Aspect ratio: 11.7
- Empty weight: 250 kg (550 lb)
- Gross weight: 350 kg (770 lb)

Performance

- Maximum speed: 250 km/h (160 mph, 140 kn)
- Maximum glide ratio: 21
- Rate of sink: 0.80 m/s (160 ft/min)
