= DFS Kranich =

German two-seat glider, 1935

Kranich
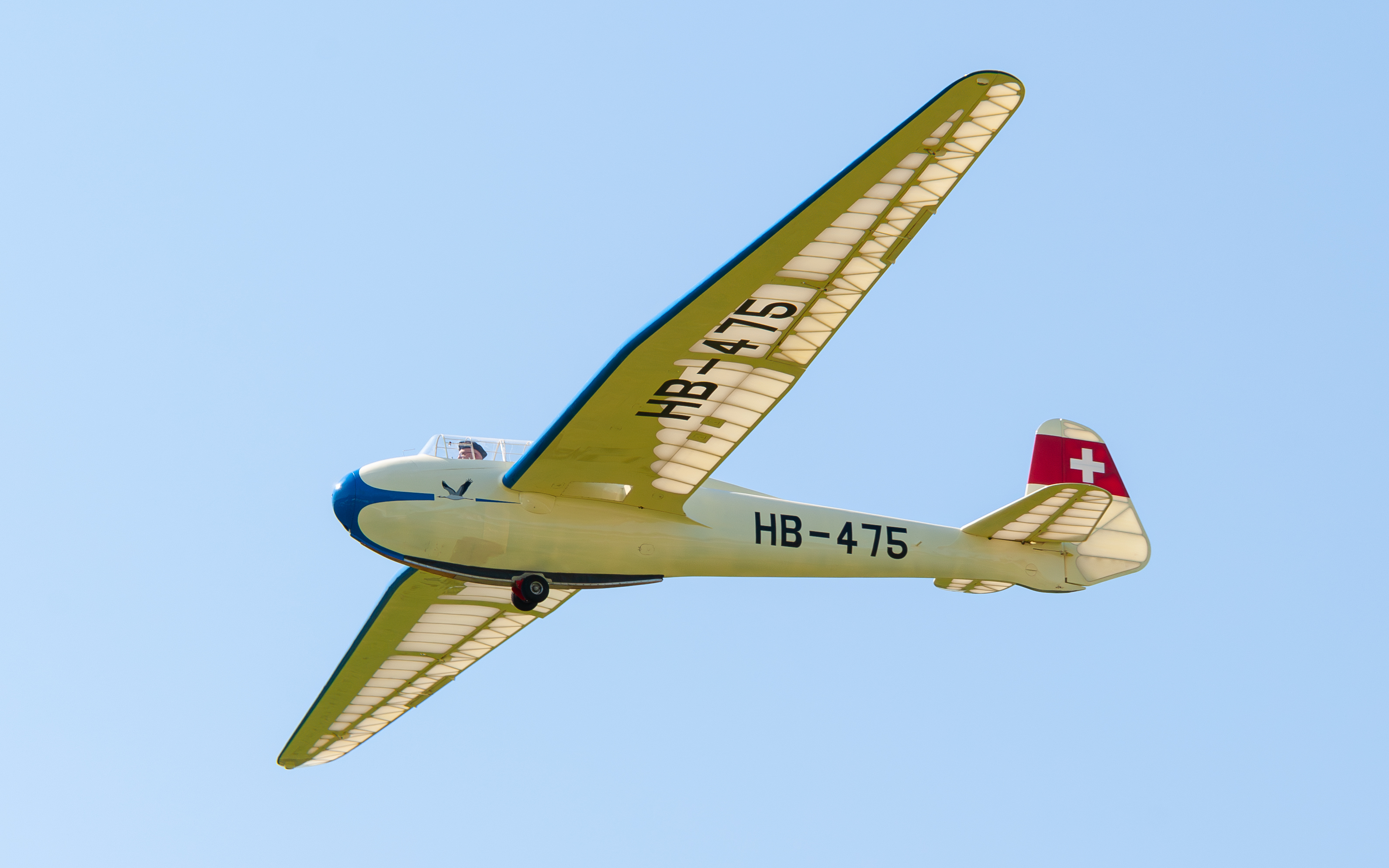
- A DFS Kranich built in 1938

General information
- Type: Two-seat sailplane
- Manufacturer: Karl Schweyer AG (primary manufacturer)
- Designer: Hans Jacobs for DFS

History
- First flight: 1935
- Variant: SZD-C Żuraw

The DFS Kranich is a type of German glider. It was developed by Hans Jacobs for the Deutsche Forschungsanstalt für Segelflug (DFS).

== History ==
Series production of the Kranich (Crane) took place in the aircraft division of Karl Schweyer AG in Mannheim. The two-seater was, in its version 2, the most widely built two-seat glider in Germany from 1935 to 1939. Several hundred examples were built; exact numbers are not known.

On 11 October 1940 Erich Klöckner in a Kranich achieved the record height in a glider of 11,460 m (37598 ft). Because it occurred in wartime, the altitude record was not recognized by the Allied occupying powers, and Klöckner only received official recognition by the Fédération Aéronautique Internationale (FAI) in the late 1990s. This record height was only exceeded ten years after the flight by the American Bill Ivans during a similar scientific program in the Sierra Nevada.

In 1942 30 Kranichs were built by the Swedish manufacturer AB Flygplan in Norrköping, and delivered to the Swedish Air Force for training purposes. These machines were given the military designation Flygplan Se 103.

Between 1950 and 1952 50 examples of a slightly modified copy of the Kranich II were built in Poland, known as the SZD-C Żuraw (żuraw is Kranich in Polish = "crane").

Between 1947-48 10 examples and until 1957, 17 more of a slightly modified copy of the Kranich II were built in Yugoslavia, they have also repaired two war trophy left by the Germans. They were known as the UTVA Ždral LIBIS Žerjav (ždral-žerjav is Kranich in Serbian and Slovenian = "crane").

After the war, Jacobs designed the Kranich III, a new development very different from its predecessors. It was developed and produced at the Focke-Wulf aircraft factory in Bremen. The first flight was on 1 May 1952, piloted by Hanna Reitsch. Thirty-seven were built.

== Variants ==
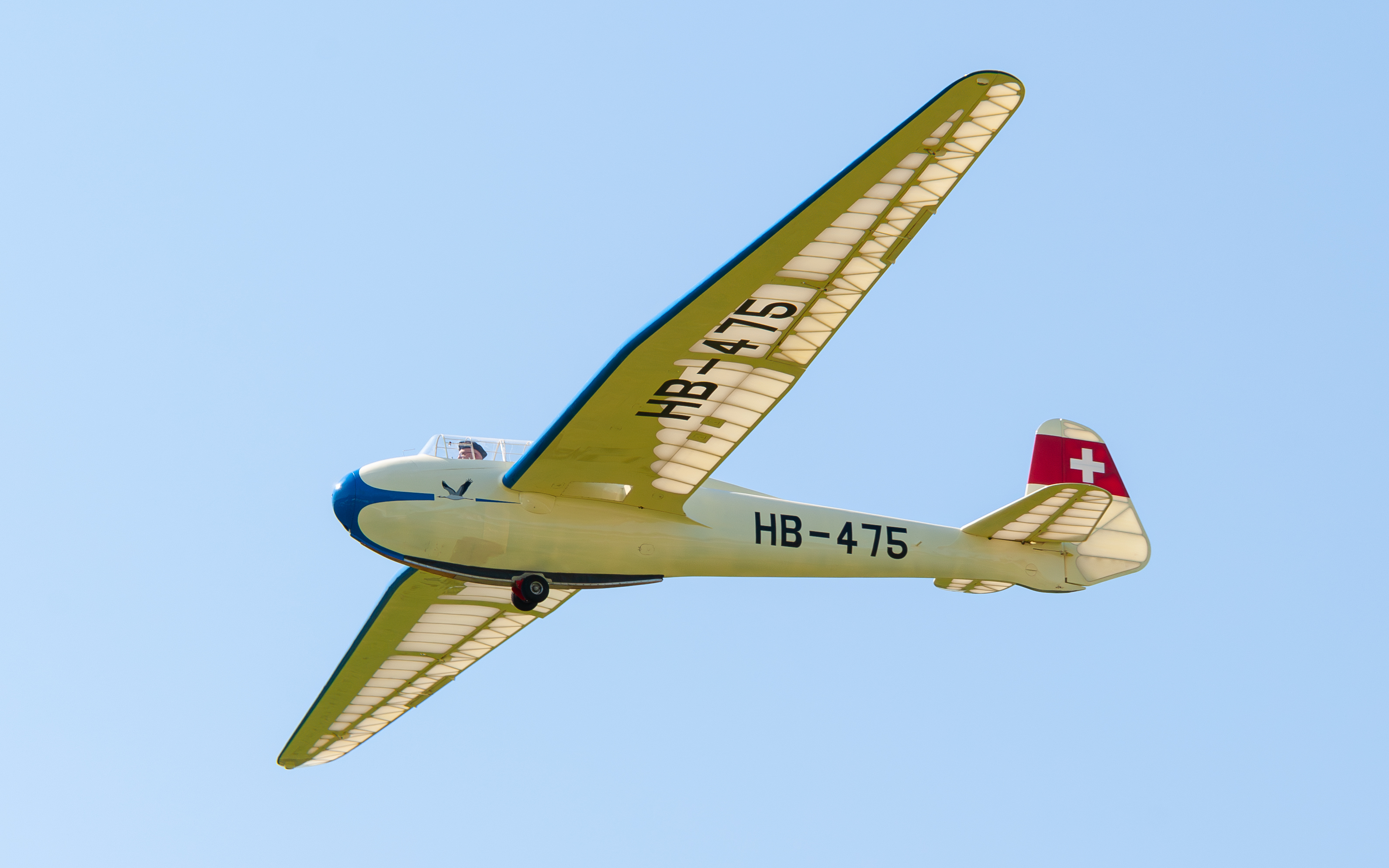
Kranich II

Kranich
The initial prototype designed by Hans Jacobs for the DFS.
Kranich II
Production aircraft built primarily by Karl Schweyer AG and by Mraz, Czechoslovakia, but also in Poland, Spain and Sweden
Liege-Kranich
Conversion of Kranich II with an additional cockpit in the glazed nose for a prone pilot. Several built. First conversion in Trebbin in the middle of World War II for the purpose of testing prone flying. Also used for training to fly new German types (BV 40, DFS 228 and DFS 346).
Flygplan Se 103
License production of 30 aircraft in Sweden for the Swedish Air Force.
SZD-C Żuraw
License production of a modified Kranich in Poland.
Focke-Wulf Kranich III
A major re-design.
UTVA Żdral
License production of 10 aircraft a modified Kranich in Yugoslavia.
LIBIS Żerjav
License production of 17 aircraft a modified Kranich in Yugoslavia by LIBIS Letalski inštitut Branko Ivanuš Slovenija.

== Specifications (Kranich II) ==
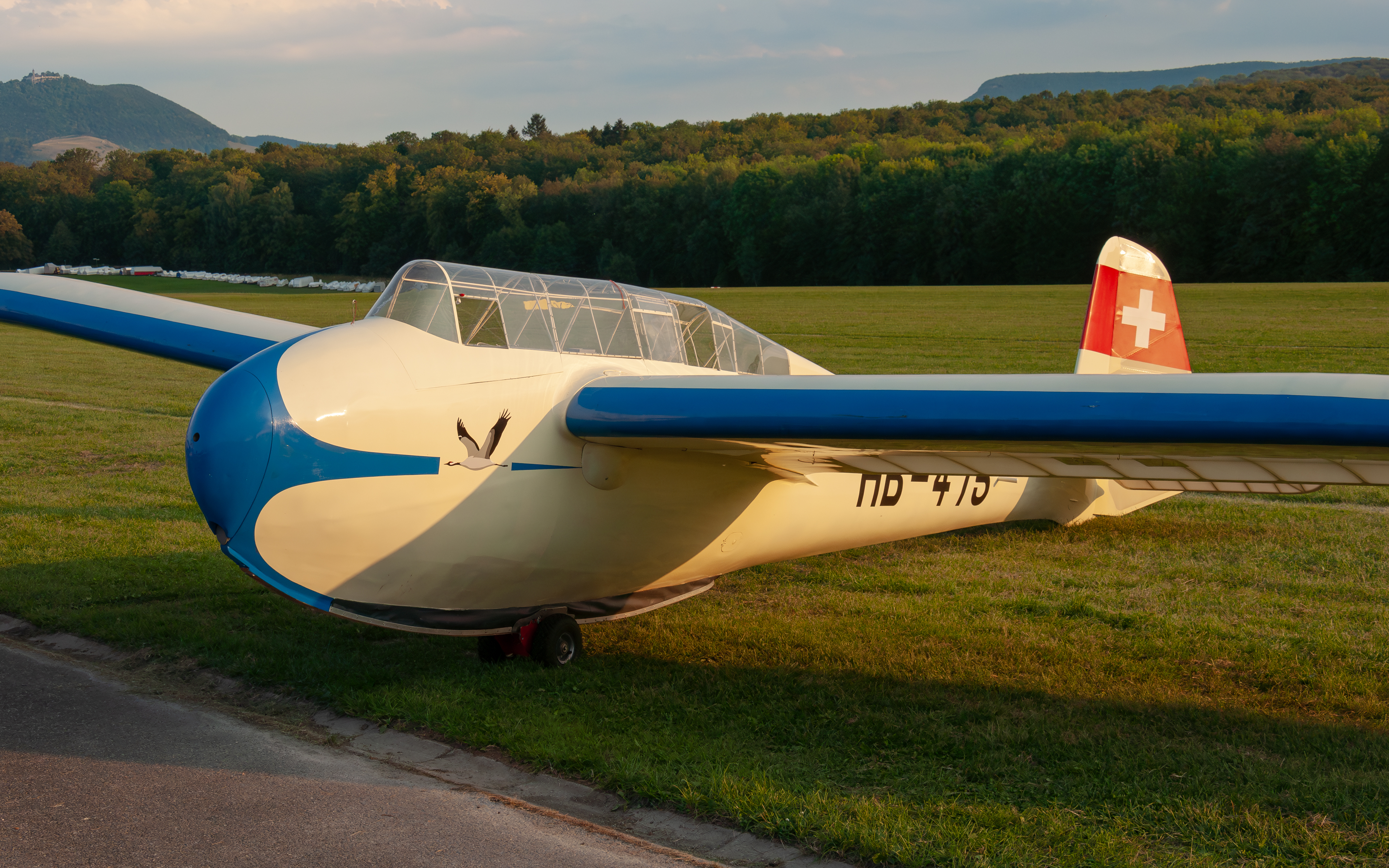
Fuselage of a DFS Kranich II-B1 built in 1938

Data from The World's Sailplanes:Die Segelflugzeuge der Welt:Les Planeurs du Monde

General characteristics

- Crew: 2
- Length: 7.7 m (25 ft 3 in)
- Wingspan: 18 m (59 ft 1 in)
- Wing area: 22.7 m^{2} (244 sq ft)
- Aspect ratio: 14.3
- Airfoil: Göttingen 535
- Empty weight: 185 kg (408 lb) (equipped)
- Max takeoff weight: 350 kg (772 lb)

Performance

- Never exceed speed: 175 km/h (109 mph, 94 kn)
- Rough air speed max: 128 km/h (80 mph; 69 kn)
- Aerotow speed: 100 km/h (62 mph; 54 kn)
- Winch launch speed: 80 km/h (50 mph; 43 kn)
- Maximum glide ratio: 23.6 at 70 km/h (43 mph; 38 kn)
- Rate of sink: 0.7 m/s (140 ft/min) at 60 km/h (37 mph; 32 kn)
- Wing loading: 19.4 kg/m^{2} (4.0 lb/sq ft)
