= Jacobs Hols der Teufel =

German single-seat glider, 1928

Hols der Teufel
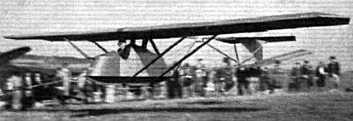

General information
- Type: Club glider
- National origin: Germany
- Manufacturer: Plans from Hans Jacobs, complete from Alexander Schleicher
- Designer: Hans Jacobs, Alexander Lippisch and Alexander Schleicher

History
- First flight: c.1928

The Jacobs Hols der Teufel (English: Devil take it) was a single seat trainer glider produced in complete and plan forms in Germany from 1928. It was built and used worldwide.

== Design and development ==
The first glider to be named the Hols der Teufel was the influential Djävaler Anamma, designed by Alexander Lippisch in 1923. The name was associated with the cursing of two Swedish students in the Wasserkuppe workshops whose favourite phrase it was. It translates into German as Hols der Teufel. Its key structural feature was an A-frame which carried wire braced wings and linked to a flat girder rear fuselage. It later evolved through the Schneider Grunau 9 into the very popular Zögling, which avoided the controversial "skullsplitter" forward member of the A-frame with a vertical strut behind the pilot, and was related to the secondary RRG Prüfling glider that replaced wire bracing with rigid lift struts.

The next machine to be named Hols der Teufel was designed by Lippisch and Hans Jacobs in 1928, possibly with the assistance of Alexander Schleicher. It had the Zögling girder frame and the strut braced wings, making it very different from its previous namesake. It was built (and named) by Alexander Schleicher in his factory in the valley below the Wasserkuppe. Detailed plans of it for amateur use were included in a book on glider building published by Jacobs in 1932 and led to its widespread construction. The complete Schleicher version differed somewhat from the plans in several details, for example more rounded wing tips and span, different girder frame cross bracing and a wire, rather than strut braced tailplane.

The Jacobs plans show the Hols der Teufel had a simple, constant chord wing much like that of the Zögling though of greater span, built around two spars and fabric covered except at the leading edge which was plywood skinned. Its broad, constant chord ailerons were longer than those of the Zögling and its round cornered, tapered tips were less angular. As before, the wing was supported by the forward members of its girder fuselage; a vertical strut near the leading edge and an inverted V-strut behind. As the wing was strut rather than wire braced there was no longer a need to extend these struts above the wing into a pylon. The two faired, parallel lift struts on each side ran from the lower forward fuselage to the wing at about mid-span.

Like some Zöglings, the Hols der Teufel had a light nacelle, ending under the wing at a forward leaning vertical knife edge around the aft central wing strut, enclosing both the pilot's seat and the other supporting struts. Aft, the cross braced girder had a horizontal upper beam onto which the tailplane was mounted, strut braced from below. Its leading edge was straight and strongly swept; the cropped, parallel chord elevators had a central cut out for rudder movement. The fin was under the tailplane, formed by fabric covering between the last two vertical fuselage fames. Its upright, near rectangular rudder was hinged on the extended, final vertical frame member. The Hols der Teufel landed on a rubber sprung skid which ran from the nose to a little beyond the aft lift struts.

== Operational history ==
The ready availability of detailed plans and the fact that with its low wing loading the Hols der Teufel was one of only a few training gliders with the soaring capability to take a pilot to a C-badge resulted in widespread amateur construction worldwide, though overall numbers are hard to establish, not least in Germany. Twelve were registered in Hungary, one imported in 1929 and the rest locally built between 1931 and 1938. Seven appear in the UK on the BGA register, including one at least that flew with the London Gliding Club for several years. During World War II some served with the ATC. Two were built by a Swiss immigrant in Brazil, one of which is on display in the Museu Aeroespacial in Rio de Janeiro, the only recorded surviving original example One was built in the 1950s in Australia.

In 1990 a reproduction Hols der Teufel, built from Jacobs' plans was flown from Dunstable; it is now in the Gliding Museum on the Wasserkuppe.

The Slingsby Kadet was the result of a conscious "crossing" of the low wing loading soaring performance of the Hols der Teufel with the better handling of the Prüfling, particularly by improving the former's poor lateral control with better ailerons.

== Variants ==
Jacobs "Hols der Teufel"
The original Lippisch and Jacobs design, popularized via Jacobs' plans in his 1932 book Segelflugzeug.
Schleicher Hols der Teufel
A slightly modified version produced by Alexander Schleicher from 1928.

== Specifications (Jacobs) ==
Data from Sailplanes 1920-1945 (2006)

General characteristics

- Crew: One
- Length: 6.50 m (21 ft 4 in)
- Wingspan: 12.568 m (41 ft 3 in)
- Wing area: 19.52 m^{2} (210.1 sq ft)
- Aspect ratio: 8.1
