= Peter Riedel =

German gliding champion (1905–1998)

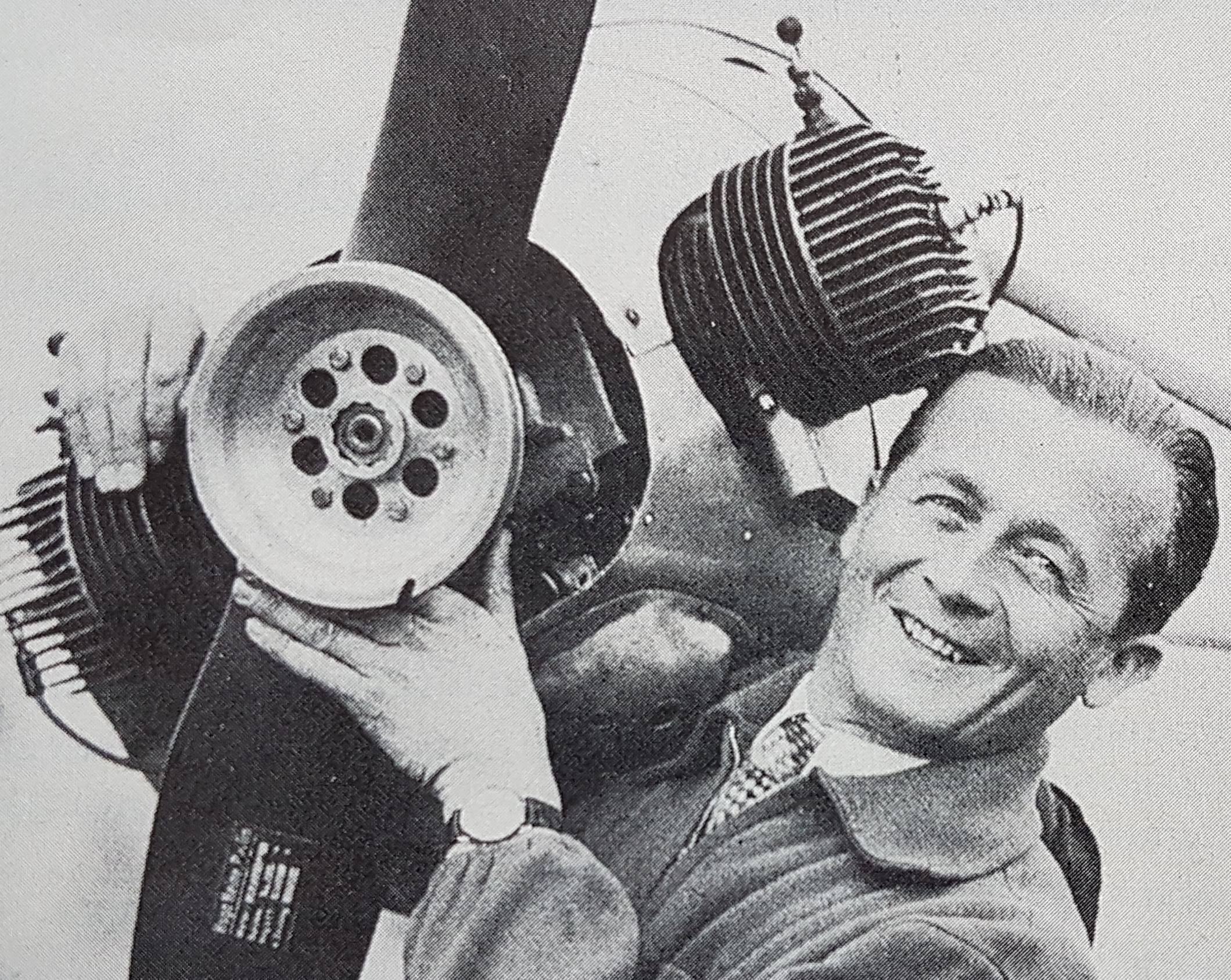
Peter Riedel

Peter Riedel (August 1905 – November 6, 1998) was a German gliding champion, and served as air attaché for the Nazi government in Washington, D.C., before and during World War II. Between 1977 and 1985, he published the definitive history of the German gliding movement prior to the war.

Riedel was born in Dehlitz, Saxony. His father was a Lutheran pastor and his mother was a professor of theology at the University of Halle. Due to his father's bouts of mental illness, and his mother's suicide, Riedel was raised for some time by an uncle.

In 1920, at the age of 15, Riedel attended the first gliding championship held at the Wasserkuppe, taking with him a half-built glider of his own design, which he completed and flew with the help of other attendees at the meet. From then on, he became a regular participant at the competitions. With the assistance of philanthropist Karl Kotzenberg, who had taken an interest in the gliding movement, Riedel was able to attend the Darmstadt University of Technology, where he studied engineering. After graduation, he trained as a commercial pilot, but could not find work, and instead spent six years working under Walter Georgii at the Deutsche Forschungsanstalt für Segelflug (DFS - German Research Institute for Sailplane Flight). In the meantime, he continued competitive gliding, setting a world distance record of 229 km (142 mi) in 1933 and winning the Hindenburg Cup at the Wasserkuppe competition the same year. In 1934, he accompanied Professor Georgii on a tour of Brazil and Argentina to help promote the sport in Latin America, along with Wolf Hirth and Heini Dittmar. While in Argentina, Riedel set a record for long-distance soaring. Hanna Reitsch also went, and the two became good friends.

Later that year, Riedel finally found work as a commercial pilot, and flew for Deutsche Luft Hansa for two years, then accepting a two-year contract with SCADTA, an airline from Colombia, not intending to return to Germany. In 1937, he competed in the Soaring Society of America's national competition. While in the U.S., he was approached by the German Military Attaché and offered a post in Washington, DC, which he accepted and took up in June 1938. His work involved gathering intelligence on U.S. air activities and reporting to Berlin. In time, he was made a commissioned officer of the Luftwaffe and given the official position of Air Attaché.

In July 1938, during the 9th Annual American Soaring Contest, Riedel -flying a two-place German sailplane of German make with Dr. Karl O. Lange, the contest director, as his passenger- landed in Mohawk Flats near Utica, New York four hours after having taken off from Elmira, New York.

When the United States entered the war, Riedel was interned along with the rest of the German embassy staff. He was returned to Germany as part of a diplomatic exchange. His wife, Helen Klug, a native of Terre Haute, Indiana and a US citizen, agreed to join him. On his return, the Heinkel company employed him as an engineer, but he soon took up another diplomatic post as Air Attaché to Sweden. There, he became aware of the atrocities of the Nazi regime from reports in both the US and Soviet press. Horrified, he began to deal directly with the US Office of Strategic Services but was betrayed by a friend and recalled to Berlin. Guessing what fate might have awaited him there, he instead went into hiding in Sweden. After the war, he was arrested as an illegal alien but escaped after some time in custody and fled to Venezuela, where Helen eventually joined him.

Over the next few years, they lived and worked in Canada and South Africa, until they could finally return to settle in the U.S., where Riedel flew for TWA and Pan Am. For a while, they resided in Terre Haute, where he worked for the Reich Manufacturing Company.

In his retirement, Riedel wrote an extensive and detailed history, in three volumes, of the German gliding movement between 1911 and 1937, titled Erlebte Rhöngeschichte. Shortly before his death, German Air Attaché, a biography, was published. Riedel is interred at Calvary Cemetery in Terre Haute.
