= DFS Weihe =

German single-seat glider, 1938

Weihe
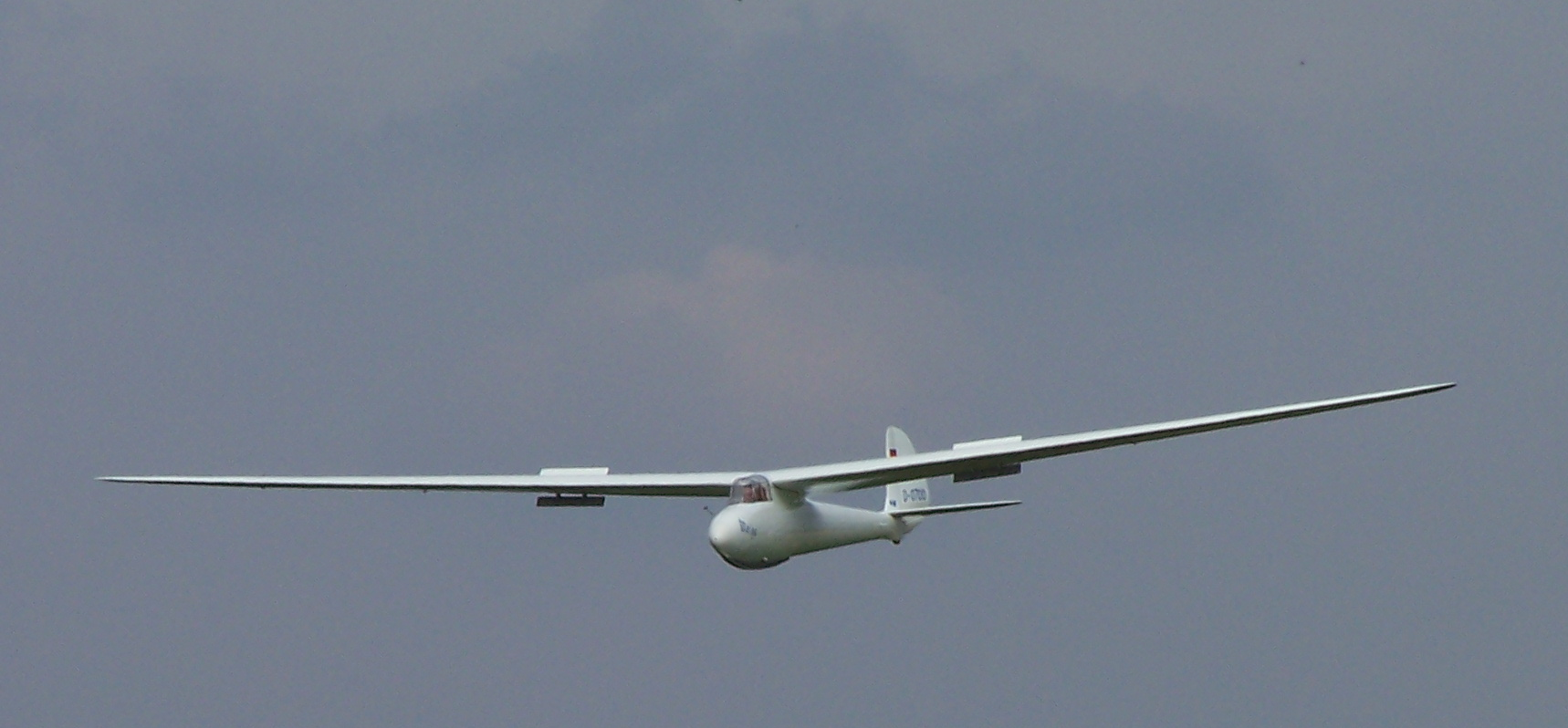

General information
- Type: Glider
- National origin: Germany
- Manufacturer: Deutsche Forschungsanstalt für Segelflug (DFS); Jacobs-Schweyer; Focke-Wulf
- Designer: Hans Jacobs
- Status: No longer in production
- Number built: More than 400

History
- Manufactured: 1938-after World War II
- Introduction date: 1938
- First flight: 1938

The DFS Weihe (English: Harrier) is a German single-seat, high-wing, 18 metre wingspan, high-performance glider that was designed by Hans Jacobs in 1937-38.

== Design and development ==
Jacobs designed the Weihe to be the pre-eminent performance glider of its era and indeed it captured many championships and set many records, until its performance was surpassed at the end of the 1950s. Even today it is considered one of the "classic sailplane designs".

The Weihe is of wooden construction with fabric covering on the wing trailing edges and the control surfaces. The spar is built from Baltic Pine, with a birch leading edge D-box, fuselage and the fixed portions of the tail surfaces. The airfoil is a modified Gö 549-M.2 section. Early versions took off from a dolly and landed on a fixed skid, while later versions has a fixed wheel and skid undercarriage. Originally fitted with DFS-style airbrakes, some were later modified for Schempp-Hirth style brakes instead. The aircraft incorporates a unique rigging system which was widely copied in later gliders.

Initially the aircraft was produced by Deutsche Forschungsanstalt für Segelflug (DFS) (English: German Research Institute for Soaring Flight) and later by Jacobs-Schweyer. Post World War II it was produced by Focke-Wulf as well as in France, Spain, Sweden and Yugoslavia. Production of the Weihe totaled over 400 aircraft.

== Operational history ==
The Weihe won the World Gliding Championships in 1948 and 1950. It was used to set many world and national records, including the world record for altitude gain in 1959 of 9,665 m (31,709 ft).

Dick Johnson won the US National Soaring Championships in 1959, flying a Weihe.

== Variants ==
DFS Weihe
Original production version.
Jacobs-Schweyer Weihe
Second production version, before World War Two. Had a larger canopy and longer nose.
Focke-Wulf Weihe 50
Post war production version, with a blown canopy and a fixed wheel.
VMA-200 Milan
Post war French production of the Weihe, by Minie, Saint-Cyr .

== Aircraft on display ==
- Lasham Airfield Gliding Heritage Centre
- Museo del Aire, Madrid, Spain
- US Southwest Soaring Museum

== Specifications (Weihe 50) ==
Data from Sailplane Directory and Soaring Magazine

General characteristics

- Crew: 1
- Length: 8.135 m (26 ft 8 in)
- Wingspan: 18.0 m (59 ft 1 in)
- Wing area: 18.34 m^{2} (197.4 sq ft)
- Aspect ratio: 17.7
- Airfoil: modified Gö 549 - root, Gö 549 - mid, M.12 - tip
- Empty weight: 215 kg (474 lb)
- Max takeoff weight: 335 kg (739 lb)

Performance

- Stall speed: 55 km/h (34 mph, 30 kn)
- Never exceed speed: 170 km/h (110 mph, 92 kn)
- Winch launch speed max: 90 km/h (56 mph; 49 kn)
- Aerotow speed: 110 km/h (68 mph; 59 kn)
- Maximum glide ratio: 29:1 at 70 km/h (43 mph; 38 kn)
- Rate of sink: 0.58 m/s (114 ft/min) at 60 km/h (37 mph; 32 kn)
- Wing loading: 18.25 kg/m^{2} (3.74 lb/sq ft)

== See also ==
Related lists

- List of gliders
