= Alexander Schleicher =

German pioneer of sailplane design

Alexander Schleicher (May 22, 1901 – April 26, 1968) was a German pioneer of sailplane design. The company that he founded and which bears his name - Alexander Schleicher GmbH & Co - is today one of the world's leading sailplane manufacturers.

Schleicher was born in Huhnrain, the son of a joiner. From the time he was fourteen years old, he worked with his father and learned his trade. As an apprentice, he worked at a furniture factory before commencing work at the Weltensegler aircraft factory in Baden-Baden in 1923. Two years later, he arrived at the Wasserkuppe and worked in the workshop of the Rhön-Rossitten Gesellschaft building sailplanes. He also learned to fly, and in 1926 won a major prize in the annual gliding championships held on the Wasserkuppe. He used this money to found his own company, beginning in the Huhnrain dance hall, and later at a rented workshop in Remmerz.

Schleicher continued to design aircraft for the firm until the outbreak of World War II, and again when German civil aviation resumed in 1951. During the years of the Allied occupation, he returned to his roots and designed furniture for the company to manufacture.

He personally managed the firm until his death in Fulda in 1968.
