= Deutsche Forschungsanstalt für Segelflug =

German research institute

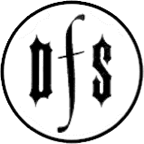
Logo of the Deutsche Forschungsanstalt für Segelflug

The Deutsche Forschungsanstalt für Segelflug (German for 'German Research Institute for Sailplane Flight' / 'German Institute for Glider Research'), or DFS, was formed in 1933 to centralise all gliding activity in Germany, under the directorship of Professor Walter Georgii. It was formed by the nationalisation of the Rhön-Rossitten Gesellschaft (RRG) at Darmstadt.

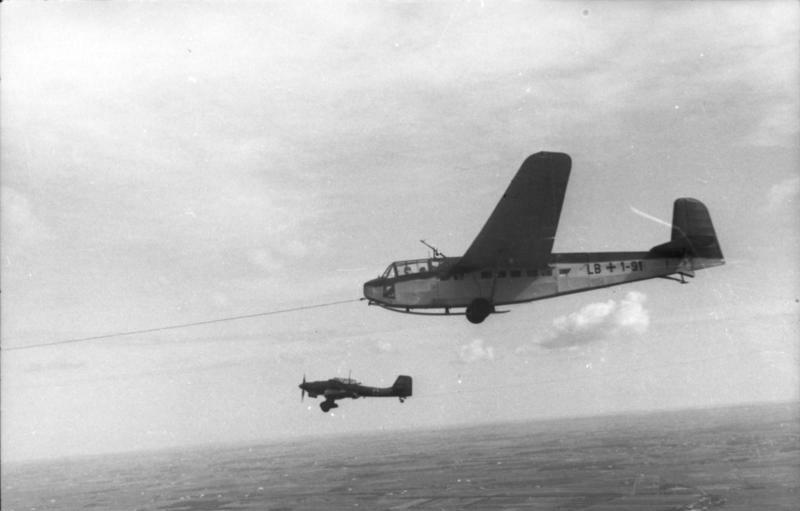
A DFS 230

The DFS was involved in producing training sailplanes for the Hitler Youth and Luftwaffe, as well as conducting research into advanced technologies such as flying wings and rocket propulsion. Notable DFS-produced aircraft include the DFS 230 transport glider (1600+ produced), the German counterpart to the British Airspeed Horsa glider, and the DFS 194, similar to the famous Messerschmitt Me 163 rocket fighter.

In 1938, following a fatal accident at the Wasserkuppe, DFS held a competition to design a more effective speed brake for gliders. The final design, produced by Wolfgang and Ulrich Hütter of Schempp-Hirth, is used to this day and generally referred to as "Schempp-Hirth airbrakes".

== List of some major DFS aircraft projects ==
DFS Model 6
Target glider (prototypes only), 1936
DFS Model 12
see Argus As 292 1937
DFS 39
Lippisch-designed tail-less research aircraft
DFS 40
Lippisch-designed tail-less research aircraft
DFS 193
experimental aircraft
DFS 194
rocket-powered research aircraft, forerunner of Me 163
DFS 228
High-altitude rocket-powered reconnaissance aircraft (prototype only)
DFS 230
transport glider (1600 produced)
DFS 331
transport glider (prototype)
DFS 332
DFS 346
supersonic research aircraft
Stamer-Lippisch Zögling 1
basic trainer
DFS Hangwind
(Ridge Lift), basic trainer (twin boom)
DFS Professor
high-performance sailplane
DFS E 32
sailplane
Einheitsschulflugzeug
(Standard Flight Trainer), glider, basic flight trainer (foldable tail)
DFS Fliege IIa
(Fly), sailplane
DFS Jacht 71
Amphibious sailplane
DFS Condor
high-performance sailplane
DFS Rhönadler
(Eagle of the Rhön), high-performance sailplane
DFS Stanavo
high-performance sailplane
DFS Weihe
high-performance sailplane
DFS Zögling 33
basic training glider
DFS Hol's der Teufel
(To Hell With It!), training glider
DFS Moazag'otl
high-performance sailplane
DFS Rhönbussard
sailplane
DFS São Paulo
high-performance sailplane
DFS Präsident
(President), high-performance sailplane
DFS Rhönsperber
high-performance sailplane
DFS Zögling 35
updated version of the Zögling basic trainer
DFS Habicht
aerobatic sail-plane
DFS Kranich
(Crane), two-seat sailplane
Schulgleiter 38
basic training glider
DFS B6
high-performance sailplane
DFS Ha III
high-performance sailplane
DFS Reiher
high-performance sailplane
DFS Olympia Meise
high-performance sailplane
DFS Seeadler
(sea eagle), flying boat sailplane
DFS Rammer
aerial ramming plane project powered by a solid rocket engine
DFS Eber
parasite fighter project

== Legacy of the DFS ==
The modern DLR still does research into gliding flight, as the DFS once did. An example of this is their enlarged 17-meter wingspan Glaser-Dirks DG-300 Elan high-performance glider, used to precisely set and measure comparative glider performance parameters.

== See also ==
- Hanna Reitsch
- Hans Jacobs
- List of Gliders
- List of aircraft of the WW2 Luftwaffe
- List of RLM aircraft designations
- Glider manufacturers
