= Hanna Reitsch =

German aviator and test pilot

Flugkapitän Hanna Reitsch
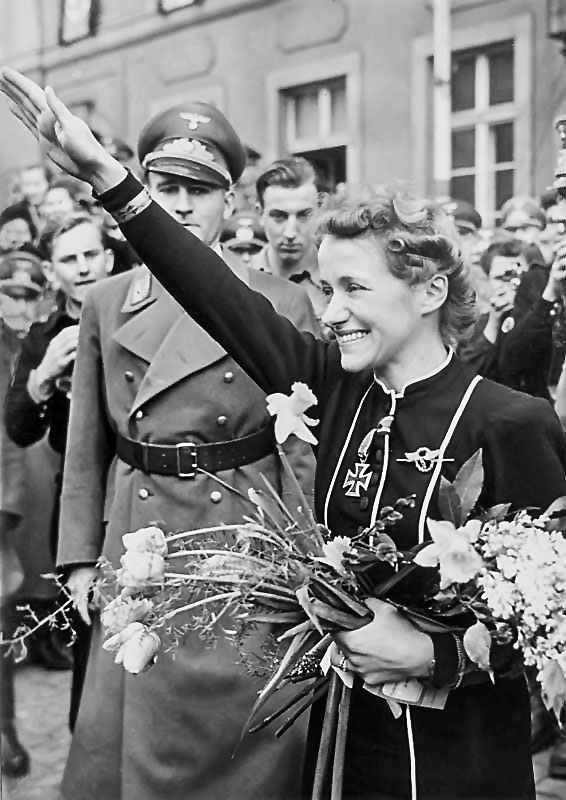
- Reitsch in 1941
- Born: 29 March 1912; Hirschberg, Silesia, Kingdom of Prussia, German Empire (Now Jelenia Góra, Poland)
- Died: 24 August 1979 (aged 67); Frankfurt am Main, Hesse, West Germany
- Known for: Nazism, Aviator, test pilot: First woman to earn the Silver C Badge; First woman to fly a helicopter; First woman to pilot a rocket plane; First woman to fly a jet; Iron Cross First Class Luftwaffe (one of only three women); Pilot/Observer Badge in Gold with Diamonds (only woman); Honorary member of the Society of Experimental Test Pilots (one of only three women); Member #1 of the Whirly-Girls female helicopter-pilot association
- Partner: She never married or had a long-term relationship

Hanna Reitsch (29 March 1912 – 24 August 1979) was a German aviator and test pilot. Reitsch was among the very last people to meet Adolf Hitler before his suicide in the Führerbunker in April 1945. Following her capture, she provided information about her departure from Berlin and denied that she might have helped Hitler escape.

During the 1930s, Reitsch set more than 40 flight altitude records and women's endurance records in gliding and unpowered flight. In the 1960s, she was sponsored by the West German foreign office as a technical adviser in Ghana and elsewhere. She also founded a gliding school in Ghana, where she worked for Kwame Nkrumah.

== Early life and education ==
Reitsch was born in Hirschberg, Silesia, on 29 March 1912 to an upper-middle-class family. She was daughter of Dr. Wilhelm (Willy) Reitsch, who was an ophthalmology clinic manager, and his wife Emy Helff-Hibler von Alpenheim, who was a member of the Austrian nobility. Despite her mother being a devout Catholic, Hanna was raised a Protestant. She had two siblings, brother Kurt, a naval Fregattenkapitän (frigate captain), and younger sister Heidi. Reitsch began flight training in 1932 at the School of Gliding in Grunau. While a medical student in Berlin, she enrolled in a German Air Mail amateur flying school for powered aircraft at Staaken, training in a Klemm Kl 25.

== Career ==
=== 1933–1937 ===
In 1933, Reitsch left medical school at the University of Kiel to become, at the invitation of Wolf Hirth, a full-time glider pilot/instructor at Hornberg in Baden-Württemberg. As well as instructional duties, she set an endurance record for women of 11 hours and 20 minutes but this had to be "unofficial" because the observations that were necessary for a record were not fulfilled.

Reitsch also contracted with the Ufa Film Company as a stunt pilot for a film called "Rivals of the Air", in which as well as other flying, she had to land in a lake.

In January 1934, she joined a South American expedition to study thermal conditions, along with Wolf Hirth, Peter Riedel and Heini Dittmar. While in Argentina, she became the first woman to earn the Silver C Badge, the 25th in the world.

In June 1934, Reitsch became a member of the Deutsche Forschungsanstalt für Segelflug (DFS) and became a test pilot in 1935. Reitsch enrolled in the Civil Airways Training School in Stettin, where she flew a twin-engined aircraft on a cross country flight and aerobatics in a Focke-Wulf Fw 44.

In 1937, Ernst Udet gave Reitsch the honorary title of Flugkapitän after she had successfully tested Hans Jacobs's divebrakes for gliders. At the DFS, she test-flew transport and troop-carrying gliders, including the DFS 230 that was used at the Battle of Fort Eben-Emael.

=== 1937–1945 ===
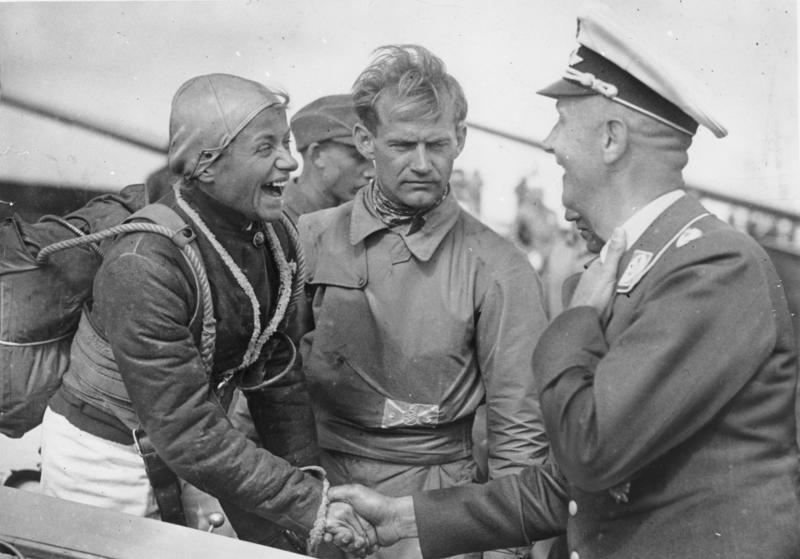
Reitsch in 1936 at Wasserkuppe

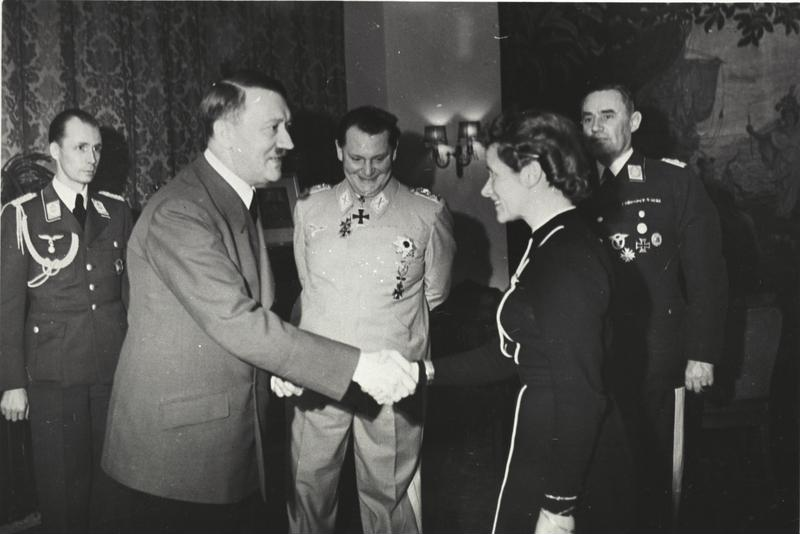
Hitler awards Reitsch the Iron Cross 2nd Class in March 1941

In September 1937, Reitsch was posted to the Luftwaffe testing centre at Rechlin-Lärz Airfield by Ernst Udet.

Her flying skill, desire for publicity, and photogenic qualities made her a star of Nazi propaganda. Physically she was petite and very slender, with blonde hair, blue eyes and a "ready smile". She appeared in Nazi propaganda throughout the late 1930s and early 1940s.

Reitsch was the first female helicopter pilot and one of the few pilots to fly the Focke-Achgelis Fa 61, the first fully controllable helicopter, for which she received the Military Flying Medal. In 1938, during the three weeks of the International Automobile Exhibition in Berlin, she made daily flights of the Fa 61 helicopter inside the Deutschlandhalle.

In September 1938, Reitsch flew the DFS Habicht in the US National Air Races. By the end of the 1930s, Reitsch had set more than 40 flight altitude records and women's endurance records in gliding and unpowered flight.

Reitsch was a test pilot on the Junkers Ju 87 Stuka dive bomber and Dornier Do 17 light/fast bomber projects, for which she received the Iron Cross, Second Class, from Hitler on 28 March 1941. Reitsch was asked to fly many of Germany's latest designs, among them the rocket-propelled Messerschmitt Me 163 Komet in 1942. A crash landing on her fifth Me 163 flight badly injured Reitsch; she spent five months in a hospital recovering. Reitsch received the Iron Cross First Class following the accident, one of only three women to do so.

In February 1943 after news of the defeat in the Battle of Stalingrad, she accepted an invitation from Generaloberst Robert Ritter von Greim to visit the Eastern Front. She spent three weeks visiting Luftwaffe units, flying a Fieseler Fi 156 Storch.

==== V1 (1944) ====
On 28 February 1944, she presented the idea of Operation Suicide to Hitler at Berchtesgaden, which "would require men who were ready to sacrifice themselves in the conviction that only by this means could their country be saved." Although Hitler "did not consider the war situation sufficiently serious to warrant them ... and ... this was not the right psychological moment", he gave his approval. The project was assigned to Gen. Günther Korten. About 70 volunteers enrolled in the Suicide Group as pilots for the human glider-bomb. By April 1944, Reitsch and Heinz Kensche finished tests of the Me 328, carried aloft by a Dornier Do 217. By then, she was approached by SS-Obersturmbannführer Otto Skorzeny, a founding member of the SS- Selbstopferkommando Leonidas (Leonidas Squadron). They adapted the V-1 flying bomb into the Fieseler Fi 103R Reichenberg, including a training single-seater with landing flaps, a training two-seater with no power unit, and an operation single-seater without landing flaps. The plan was never implemented operationally due to other war concerns.

In her autobiography, Reitsch recalled that after two initial crashes with the Fi 103R she and Heinz Kensche took over tests of the prototype Fi 103R. She made several successful test flights before training the instructors. "Though an average pilot could fly the V1 without difficulty once it was in the air, to land it called for exceptional skill, in that it had a very high landing speed and, moreover, in training it was the glider model, without engine, that was usually employed."

In October 1944, Reitsch claimed she was shown a booklet by Peter Riedel which he had obtained while in the German Embassy in Stockholm, concerning the gas chambers. She further claimed that while believing it to be enemy propaganda, she agreed to inform Heinrich Himmler about it. When she did, Himmler is said to have asked whether she believed it, and she replied, "No, of course not. But you must do something to counter it. You can't let them shoulder this onto Germany." Himmler replied, "You are right."

==== Escape from Berlin (1945) ====
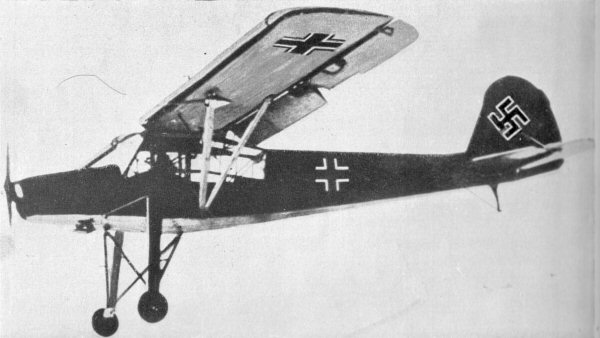
A Fieseler Fi 156 Storch similar to the one Reitsch landed in the Tiergarten during the Battle of Berlin

In late April 1945, during the Battle of Berlin, Hitler dismissed Hermann Göring as head of the Luftwaffe and appointed Robert Ritter von Greim to replace him. Reitsch had been making military and personal flights between Breslau (Poland), Munich (Germany), and Kitzbühel (Austria) when von Greim instructed her to meet him in Munich, thinking he might need her to pilot a helicopter. Reitsch said goodbye to her family late on 25 April at the Schloss Leopoldskron in Salzburg before driving to Munich. That night, she and von Greim were flown in a Ju 188 from Germany's Neubiberg Air Base to the Rechlin airfield, about 100 km (60 mi) northwest of Berlin. They were then flown to Gatow, Berlin, in a Focke-Wulf Fw 190 (Reitsch riding in the tail by way of an emergency opening), protected against the Soviets by perhaps 40 fighters, including 12 other Fw 190s from Jagdgeschwader 26 under Hauptmann Hans Dortenmann's command. The pair took a Fi 156 Storch, first piloted by von Greim until his foot was struck by a bullet, then by Reitsch reaching over him to land on an improvised airstrip in the Tiergarten near the Brandenburg Gate.

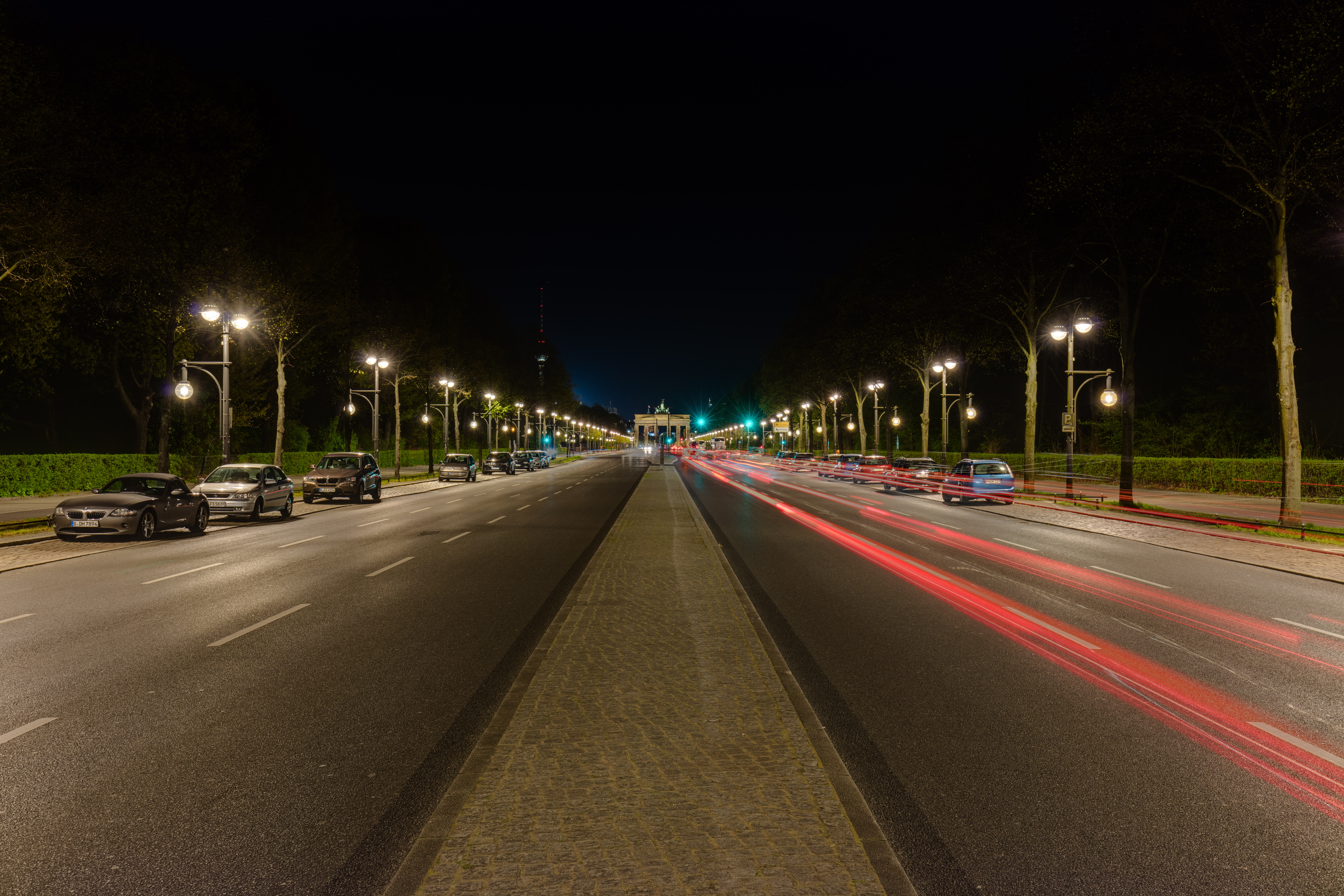
The Tiergarten's Straße des 17. Juni served as an improvised airstrip.

The pair arrived in the Führerbunker on the evening of 26 April, when Red Army troops were already in central Berlin. Hitler thanked von Greim for coming in light of Göring's dismissal. Late that night, the Reich Chancellery received the first heavy Soviet barrage. As arranged with Rechlin a day before, on 27 April a Ju 52 landed on the makeshift runway for Reitsch and von Greim, (Note: Arriving after several other planes were shot down, the Ju 52 arrived with SS guards and ammunition aboard, but was told to return empty.) but having learned of Göring's betrayal, they decided to stay in a gesture of loyalty. Later on 27 April, Hitler gave Reitsch two capsules of poison for herself and von Greim, which she accepted. (Note: Hitler also told her that everyone was responsible for finding a way to render their own body unrecognizable to prevent being from humiliated by the Soviets.) Hitler suggested that General Walther Wenck's 12th Army could still save them and spent the next two days contemplating this. On 29 April, a telegram reported that Himmler had made unauthorised contact with the western Allies regarding surrender terms. Shortly after midnight on 30 April, (Note: Later sources place this a day earlier.) Hitler ordered Reitsch and von Greim to fly out of Berlin in an Arado Ar 96 that had arrived on 28 April, (Note: The Ar 96 was flown to the Tiergarten by the pilot who had flown Reitsch and von Greim to Gatow; he perhaps flew them out of Berlin.) asserting that they could get Wenck to save Berlin. Von Greim was ordered to command the Luftwaffe to attack the Soviet forces that had just reached Potsdamer Platz and to make sure Himmler was punished for his treachery. (Note: The Luftwaffe order differs in different sources: Beevor states it was to attack Potsdamer Platz, but Ziemke states that it was to support Wenck's 12th Army attack (towards Potsdam); both agree that he was also ordered to make sure Himmler was punished.)

Reitsch reputedly stated during her 1945 interrogation that she left Berlin early on 30 April, less than 12 hours before Hitler's suicide. (Note: A New York Times article (wrongly announcing her capture in the American occupation zone in Germany on 9 October 1945, which had actually occurred in Austria on 4 May) sensationally claimed that Reitsch was in the Führerbunker "a few hours" before Hitler's death.) In his 1947 book, Hugh Trevor-Roper cites this as a factual error, while arguing that Reitsch's account is biased in favor of Hitler and especially von Greim. (Note: Additionally, in 1945, Reitsch shared the story of Hermann Fegelein's death the night of her departure, but later admitted she only knew of it via hearsay.) Trevor-Roper dates Reitsch's escape to the very early hours of 29 April, citing other eyewitnesses and noting that she lacked knowledge of Hitler's wedding to Eva Braun (which took place just after). (Note: Late in her life, Reitsch condemned Trevor-Roper's book, stating that "Throughout ... like a red line, runs an eyewitness report by Hanna Reitsch. I never said it. I never wrote it. I never signed [the interrogation reports]. It was something they invented." (Such reports are not always signed.)) The interrogation report claims that the plane took off from the Tiergarten's makeshift runway under heavy Soviet fire; it was spotted by searchlights and attacked by shells, but only shrapnel hit the plane. In her 1951 book, Reitsch wrote that although it was fairly clear and moonlit, the plane took off on 29 April without detection and she saw only "spasmodic" tracer fire from the Soviets before finding a cloud to hide behind, about a mile away. (Note: Some historians speculate that after their takeoff on 29 April, the Soviet troops were surprised by the action (thinking Hitler could be escaping), causing their delayed engagement.) Although Reitsch claimed to her interrogators that there was no plane in the area that Hitler could have used to escape, in the 1970s she told American journalist James P. O'Donnell that after takeoff, she saw a Ju 52 in the area along with a pilot "obviously waiting for somebody". O'Donnell asked pilot Hans Baur about this, having learned (possibly from Reitsch) that he saw her and von Greim to the runway; Baur said he no knowledge of such a plane, leading the author to speculate that the plane had been ordered by Hermann Fegelein and that it had arrived after air traffic control shut down due to the Soviet advance. Baur agreed with the speculation.

After leaving Berlin, Reitsch and von Greim landed in Rechlin, then flew in a Bücker 181 to Lübeck, where they heard the German announcement of Hitler's death on the night of 1 May (Note: The 1 May announcement falsely claimed that Hitler had died "this afternoon", but the suicide event took place a day earlier, on 30 April.) (Note: Reitsch dated the broadcast to 30 April.) and met with officials of the new government. In an effort to continue engaging the Soviets, Reitsch and von Greim flew to Graz, Austria, on 7 May and to Zell am See two days later, by which time Germany had formally surrendered. Reitsch's family had evacuated from Silesia before the Soviet troops arrived and taken refuge in Salzburg; on the night of 3 May 1945, after hearing a rumour that all refugees were to be taken back to their original homes in the Soviet occupation zone, Reitsch's father shot and killed her mother, her sister, her sister's three children, and himself. Von Greim, after being captured by the Allies, killed himself on 24 May 1945.

On 4 May 1945—having learned that a woman resembling Reitsch was hiding in an American hospital near Kitzbühel, Austria—British test pilot and Royal Navy officer Eric Brown came to visit her. Recognizing him, Reitsch pretended she was having a heart attack. Brown handed Reitsch into American custody, and after their initial interviews, was allowed to converse with her about his fascination with the Me 163. Reitsch was placed under house arrest at Schloss Leopoldskron, then was transferred to a villa for questioning by the head of the United States Air Force's intelligence unit, which compiled an interrogation report on 8 October. When asked about being ordered to leave the Führerbunker, Reitsch stated: "It was the blackest day when we could not die at our Führer's side." She asserted that "We should all kneel down in reverence and prayer before the altar of the Fatherland," referring to the bunker. After it was suggested that Hitler had been seen alive (in Tyrol, Austria, near where she had flown), Reitsch dismissed assertions of his survival and her possible complicity, stating, "He had no reason to live and the tragedy was that he knew it ... perhaps better than anyone else did."

Reitsch claimed that Hitler's initial motivation was "how to give his people a life free from economic insufficiencies and social maladjustments", but gambled with the lives of people: "the first great wrong, his first great failure". She criticised his incompetence as a leader (e.g. his selection of the wrong persons for office) and stated that Hitler had transformed ideologically, becoming a despot. Reitsch stated repeatedly that never again must an individual have so much control over any country. Reitsch's interrogator noted that she seemed to be a reliable witness, having struggled with thoughts of suicide since the war but more recently becoming interested in advocating for democracy. She was held for 18 months.

=== 1947–1979 ===
After her release, Reitsch settled in Frankfurt am Main. After the war, German citizens were barred from flying powered aircraft, but within a few years, gliding was allowed, which she took up again. In 1952, Reitsch won a bronze medal in the World Gliding Championships in Spain; she was the first woman to compete and in 1955, she became German champion. She continued to break records, including the women's altitude record (6,848 m or 22,467 ft) in 1957, and her first diamond of the Gold-C badge.

During the mid-1950s, Reitsch was interviewed on film and talked about her wartime flight tests of the Fa 61, Me 262 and Me 163.

In 1959, Indian Prime Minister Jawaharlal Nehru invited Reitsch, who spoke fluent English, to start a gliding centre; she flew with him over New Delhi. In 1961, she accepted U.S. President John F. Kennedy's invitation to the White House.

From 1962 to 1966, she lived in Ghana. The then Ghanaian President, Kwame Nkrumah invited Reitsch to Ghana after reading of her work in India. At Afienya, she founded the first indigenous African national gliding school, working closely with the government and the armed forces. The West German government supported her as technical adviser. The school was commanded by J. E. S. de Graft-Hayford, with gliders such as the double-seated Schleicher K7, Slingsby T.21 and a Bergfalke, along with a single-seated Schleicher K 8. She gained the FAI Diamond Badge in 1970. The project was evidently of great importance to Nkrumah and has been interpreted as part of a "modernist" development ideology.

Reitsch's attitudes to race underwent a change. She stated that "Earlier in my life, it would never have occurred to me to treat a black person as a friend or partner". She now experienced guilt at her earlier "presumptuousness and arrogance". She became close to Nkrumah. The details of their relationship are now unclear due to the destruction of documents, but some surviving letters are intimate in tone.

In Ghana, some Africans were disturbed by the prominence of a person with Reitsch's past, but Shirley Graham Du Bois, a noted African-American writer who had emigrated to Ghana and was friendly towards Reitsch, agreed with Nkrumah that Reitsch was extremely naive politically. Contemporary Ghanaian press reports seem to show a lack of interest in her past.

Throughout the 1970s, Reitsch broke gliding records in many categories, including the "Women's Out and Return World Record" twice, once in 1976 (715 km or 444 mi) and again, in 1979 (802 km or 498 mi), flying along the Appalachian Ridges in the U.S. During this time, she also finished first in the women's section of the first world helicopter championships.

==== Last interview (1970s) ====
Reitsch was interviewed and photographed several times in the 1970s, towards the end of her life, by Jewish-American photojournalist Ron Laytner. In her closing remarks she is quoted as saying:

And what have we now in Germany? A country of bankers and car-makers. Even our great army has gone soft. Soldiers wear beards and question orders. I am not ashamed to say I believed in National Socialism. I still wear the Iron Cross with diamonds Hitler gave me. But today in all of Germany you can't find a single person who voted Adolf Hitler into power ... Many Germans feel guilty about the war. But they don't explain the real guilt we share – that we lost.

In the same interview, she is quoted as saying,

I asked Hermann Göring one day, "What is this I am hearing that Germany is killing Jews?" Göring responded angrily, "A totally outrageous lie made up by the British and American press. It will be used as a rope to hang us someday if we lose the war."

== Death ==
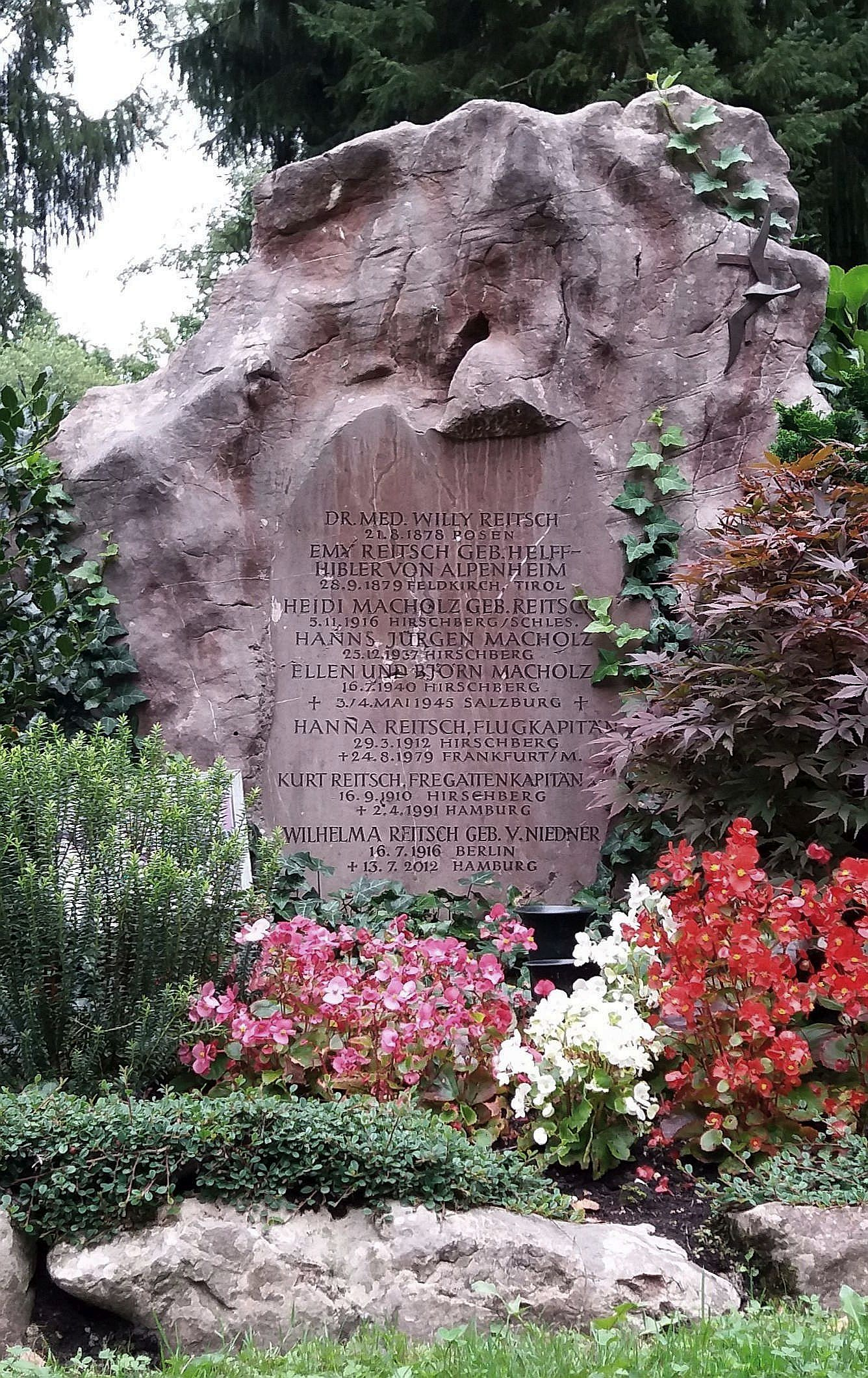
Grave of Hanna Reitsch in Salzburg

Reitsch died suddenly from an apparent heart attack in Frankfurt at the age of 67, on 24 August 1979. She had never married. She is buried in the Reitsch family grave in the Salzburger Kommunalfriedhof.

Former British pilot Eric Brown said he received a letter from Reitsch in early August 1979, in which she said, "It began in the bunker, there it shall end." Within weeks, she was dead from an apparent heart attack. Brown however, speculated that Reitsch had taken the cyanide capsule Hitler had given her in the bunker and that she had taken it as part of a suicide pact with Greim. There is no record of a postmortem.

== List of awards and world records ==
- 1932: women's gliding endurance record (5.5 hours)
- 1936: women's gliding distance record (305 km (190 mi))
- 1937: first woman to cross the Alps in a glider
- 1937: the first woman in the world to be promoted to flight captain by Colonel Ernst Udet
- 1937: the first woman to fly a helicopter (Fa 61)
- 1937: world distance record in a helicopter (109 km (68 mi))
- 1938: the first person to fly a helicopter (Fa 61) inside an enclosed space (Deutschlandhalle)
- 1938: winner of German national gliding competition Sylt-Breslau Silesia
- 1939: women's world record in gliding for point-to-point flight.
- 1943: While in the Luftwaffe, the first woman to pilot a rocket plane (Messerschmitt Me 163). She survived a disastrous crash though with severe injuries and because of this she became the first of three German women to receive the Iron Cross First Class.
- 1944: the first woman in the world to pilot a jet aircraft at the Luftwaffe research centre at Rechlin during the trials of the Messerschmitt Me 262 and Heinkel He 162
- 1952: third place in the World Gliding Championships in Spain together with her team-mate Lisbeth Häfner
- 1955: German gliding champion
- 1956: German gliding distance record (370 km (230 mi))
- 1957: German gliding altitude record (6,848 m (22,467 ft))

== Books by Hanna Reitsch ==
- Fliegen, mein Leben. 4th ed. Munich: Herbig, 2001 [1951]. ISBN 3-7766-2197-4 (Autobiography)
- Ich flog in Afrika für Nkrumahs Ghana. 2nd ed. Munich: Herbig, 1979. ISBN 3-7766-0929-X (original title: Ich flog für Kwame Nkrumah).
- Das Unzerstörbare in meinem Leben. 7th ed. Munich: Herbig, 1992. ISBN 3-7766-0975-3.
- Höhen und Tiefen. 1945 bis zur Gegenwart. Munich: Heyne, 1984. ISBN 3-453-01963-6.
- Höhen und Tiefen. 1945 bis zur Gegenwart. 2nd expanded ed. Munich/Berlin: Herbig, 1978. ISBN 3-7766-0890-0.

== In popular culture ==
- Reitsch is one of the two female test pilots (alongside Melitta von Stauffenberg) featured in The Woman Who Flew for Hitler (Pan Macmillan, 2017) by Clare Mulley

Reitsch has been portrayed by the following actresses in film and television productions:

- Barbara Rütting in the 1965 film Operation Crossbow
- Diane Cilento in the 1973 British film Hitler: The Last Ten Days.
- Myvanwy Jenn in the 1973 British television production The Death of Adolf Hitler.
- Anna Thalbach in the 2004 German film Downfall (German: Der Untergang).

== See also ==
- Rhön-Rossitten Gesellschaft
