= Rhön-Rossitten Gesellschaft =

The Rhön-Rossitten Gesellschaft (RRG) or Rhön-Rossitten Society was a German gliding organization, the first one in the world that was officially recognised. The Rhön-Rossitten Gesellschaft was mainly responsible for establishing gliding as a sport, not only in Germany but eventually throughout the world.

Because the Treaty of Versailles forbade any form of powered flight in Germany, many young pilots and aircraft designers turned to gliding as a sport. Under Oskar Ursinus and Theodore von Kármán, hobbyists and serious university study groups began building gliders. The first contest was held in 1920 on the mountain of the Wasserkuppe in the Rhön region of Hesse. While many of the entering designs were no more than kites and many of the 'flights' were no more than stumbles ending in a crash, Kármán and his team from the RWTH Aachen with their glider Schwarzer Teufel (Black Devil) pioneered the bungee-launching method and regularly managed flights of over a minute followed by a crash-free landing. The event was then repeated annually with a constant improvement in the gliders and the results.

Simultaneously another gliding group formed at the Rossitten sand dunes at the Curonian Spit in East Prussia. Although far apart, the enthusiasts from the Wasserkuppe and Rossitten frequently met and compared ideas, designs and techniques. One big organization was suggested to coordinate the activities at the Rhön and the Rossitten dunes, and every other gliding club that might be founded. In 1924, 'Rhönvater' (Rhön father) Oskar Ursinus convinced the then Secretary of Air Transport for the Ministry of Transportation, Dr. Brandenburg, to found a national gliding organization, the Rhön-Rossitten Gesellschaft.

From the start, the new society did everything to provide an all-round service to gliding enthusiasts: it organized yearly gliding competitions; it managed flying schools at Rossitten and the Wasserkuppe; it had its own workshops for constructing gliders and its own research team to develop newer and better gliders. There was also a meteorological work group which investigated thermals and ridge-lift.

In 1925, Ursinus took yet another bold step by appointing Alexander Lippisch as head of the technical branch of the RRG. Lippisch advanced the work of RRG by designing and building ever more sophisticated gliders. Also in 1925 the ban on powered aircraft was partially lifted and soon the RRG started experimenting with motor gliders. In addition to the 'traditional' way of bungee-launching gliders, the RRG also developed winch launching and aerotowing to get gliders airborne.

In 1933 with the Nazis in power, the RRG as an independent society could no longer exist in a uniform Nazi Germany. Therefore the RRG was broken up, and the flying club was partly absorbed by the Hitler Youth. The design and research section was preserved under the new name of "Deutsche Forschungsanstalt für Segelflug" (DFS), the German Research Society for Gliding. In the new society, Lippisch was allowed to retain his post as chief designer. Under his leadership the DFS continued to turn out a series of successful sailplanes. Up to World War II, RRG and DFS were major forces in German aeronautical design.

When Theodore von Kármán looked back at the Treaty of Versailles, he saw the motor-flight prohibition as a mistake:

I have always thought that the allies were short-sighted when they banned motor flying in Germany. They stimulated the very development they wanted to stop: the growth of German aviation. Experiments with gliders in sport sharpened German thinking in aerodynamics, structural design, and meteorology. In aerodynamics, for instance, they took attention away from the limited double- and triple-wing arrangements of World War I planes and showed how the single long span increases efficiency. The relation between span and chord is known as aspect ratio, and gliders showed that if this ratio is high efficiency is improved.

Though he had left Germany long before writing, Kármán recalled some advances made there:

In structural design, gliders showed us in Germany how to distributed weight in a light structure, and revealed new facts about vibration...we uncovered the dangers of hidden turbulence in the air, and in general opened up the study of meteorological influences on aviation.

== See also ==
- RRG Prüfling
- RRG Falke
- RRG Professor
- Hanna Reitsch
