= List of Australian gliders =

This is a list of gliders/sailplanes of the world, (this reference lists all gliders with references, where available) Note: Any aircraft can glide for a short time, but gliders are designed to glide for longer.

== Australian miscellaneous constructors ==
- Andrews 1930 Glider – Kenneth Edwin Andrews
- Armytage 1929 glider – Norman Armytage
- Barbat-Dunn-Rigby GBDR
- Brookes 1919 glider – Wilfred Brookes
- Brown Two Seater – Vincent Brown & STC-GC (Sydney Technical College Gliding Club)
- Buchanan Ricochet – John Buchanan
- Butterworth-Ypinazar Primary
- Clarkson 1930
- Davies-Nicholls Primary
- Degrandi Dresden – DeGrandi, Howard V.
- Degrandi Slope Soarer – DeGrandi, Howard V.
- Dehn Ringwing – Dehn, Karl
- Free Flight Hornet 130s – Free Flight Aviation Pty. Ltd.
- GCSA Lark – Shackleton, William Stancliffe – GCSA (Gliding Club of South Australia) & BRADLEY, Harold
- Halloran-Wedd Mayfly – Halloran, Clyde & Wedd, William G.
- Handcock 1930 glider – Handcock, William Arthur
- Hinkler 1912 glider - John Louis Hinkler (Bert)
- Iggulden Bluebird – Iggulden, William Palmer & Iggulden, Jack
- Iggulden Tandem 1929
- Iggulden Termagent 3
- Lessing glider - Lessing, Kurt
- Joey (glider)
- Zephyrus – Lyon, Douglas – Beaufort Gliding Club (Victoria, Australia)
- Marsch PG-2 – Marsch, J. C.
- Marsch Seaplane – Marsch, J. C.
- Moyes Tempest – Bob Bailey, produced by Moyes Microlights
- Pascoe EP1 Spruce Goose
- Pelican 2
- Pelton Bat – Pelton, Alfred Paul
- Pelton Bronzewing – Pelton, Alfred Paul
- Pelton ground training machine – Pelton, Alfred Paul
- Pelton Hawk – Pelton, Alfred Paul
- Phoenix (glider)
- Pratt 1929 glider – Pratt, Percival Justin
- Pratt Stunter – Pratt, Percival Justin – AMSCO (Aircraft Manufactory and Supply Company)
- Pratt Two Seater – Pratt, Percival Justin – AMSCO (Aircraft Manufactory and Supply Company)
- Pratt Utility – Pratt, Percival Justin – AMSCO (Aircraft Manufactory and Supply Company)
- Richardson Golden Eagle – Geoff Richardson
- Roberts Primary
- Saint Louis XCG-5
- Saint Louis XCG-6
- Schneider ES-52 Kookaburra two-seat training glider
- Schneider ES-54 Gnome
- Schneider ES-56 Nymph
- Schneider ES-57 Kingfisher
- Schneider ES-59 Arrow
- Schneider ES-60 Boomerang and ES-60B Super Arrow
- Schneider ES-65 Platypus two-seats, side-by-side
- SUE-1
- SUT-1 – (Sydney University Trainer 1) – Sydney University Gliding Club
- SUT-2 – (Sydney University Trainer 2) – Sydney University Gliding Club
- Sylvander Glider - Sylvander, Victor B. (1913); A 27-foot wingspan Chanute-type biplane glider
- Taylor-Moore 1931 – Taylor, Lewis & Moore, Ted
- Thomas Primary 1930 – Thomas, R. R.
- van Dusen amphibious glider
- Warner Brolga – Warner, Martin
- Warner-Campbell Kite 1 – Warner, Martin & Campbell, Allan J.
- Warner Kite 2 – Warner, Martin
- Wikner Golden Sparrow – Wikner, Geoffrey Neville
- Wikner-Lindner Secondary – Wikner, Geoffrey Neville
- Wishart 1930 glider – Wishart, Alfred William
