= Göppingen Gö 3 =

German single-seat glider, 1935

Gö 3
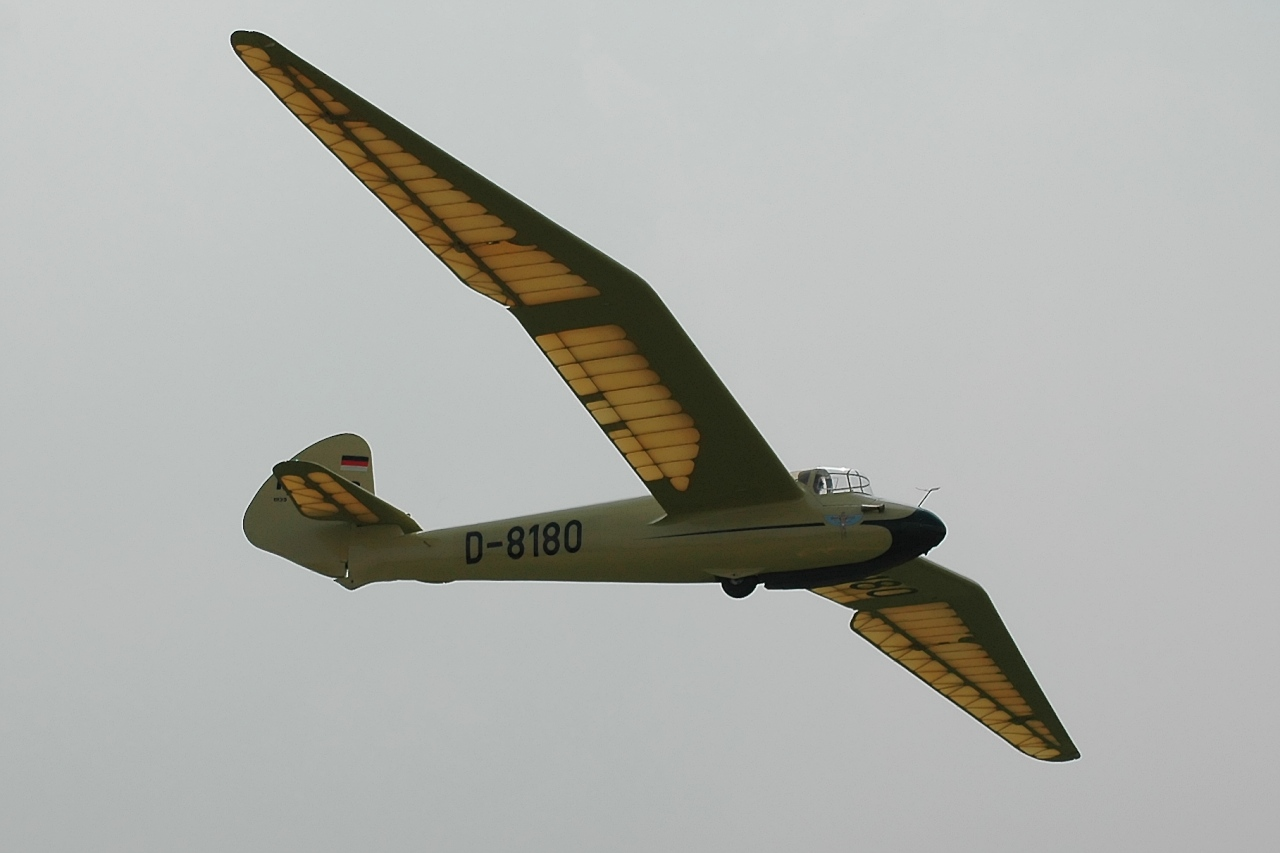

General information
- Type: Glider
- Manufacturer: Sportflugzeugbau Schempp-Hirth
- Designer: Martin Schempp and Wolf Hirth
- Number built: 110

History
- First flight: 1935

The Göppingen Gö 3 Minimoa is a single-seat sailplane produced in Germany. It was designed by Martin Schempp and Wolf Hirth and was produced the year after their first glider, the Göppingen Gö 1. It first flew in 1935. The name is derived from the name Moazagotl given to lenticularis clouds caused by the foehn wind in Sudetenland. The name was used for one of Hirth's earlier gliders and since the Gö 3 was a smaller version, it was called 'Mini' as a diminutive.

It established several records, including the world altitude record of 6,687 m (21,939 ft) in 1938 in a thunderstorm. Richard du Pont and Chet Decker flew Minimoas to win the US Championships in 1937 and 1938.

It was made out of wood and fabric with cantilevered 'gull' wings. A B-version in 1938 had thinner wings with a modified section and the gull's kink in a different place. The undercarriage was non-retractable. It was the first glider built to carry water-ballast in a tank behind the pilot.

Only five Minimoas remain airworthy: two in Germany, one in Japan, one replica built in the Netherlands and the latest one to fly in the U.K. One more is being prepared for flight in Bacchus Marsh Australia.

A 1935 Minimoa is on display at the National Soaring Museum in Elmira, NY (USA). The only known Minimoa still in private ownership in the USA is a 1938 owned by Jerry Wenger in Powell, WY (USA).

== Specifications (Gö 3) ==
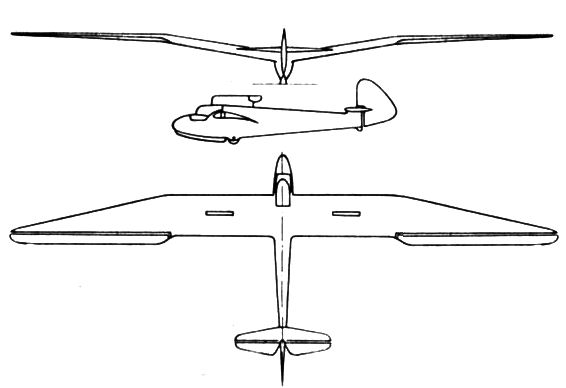
Göppingen Gö 3 Minimoa 3-view drawing from L'Aerophile March 1937

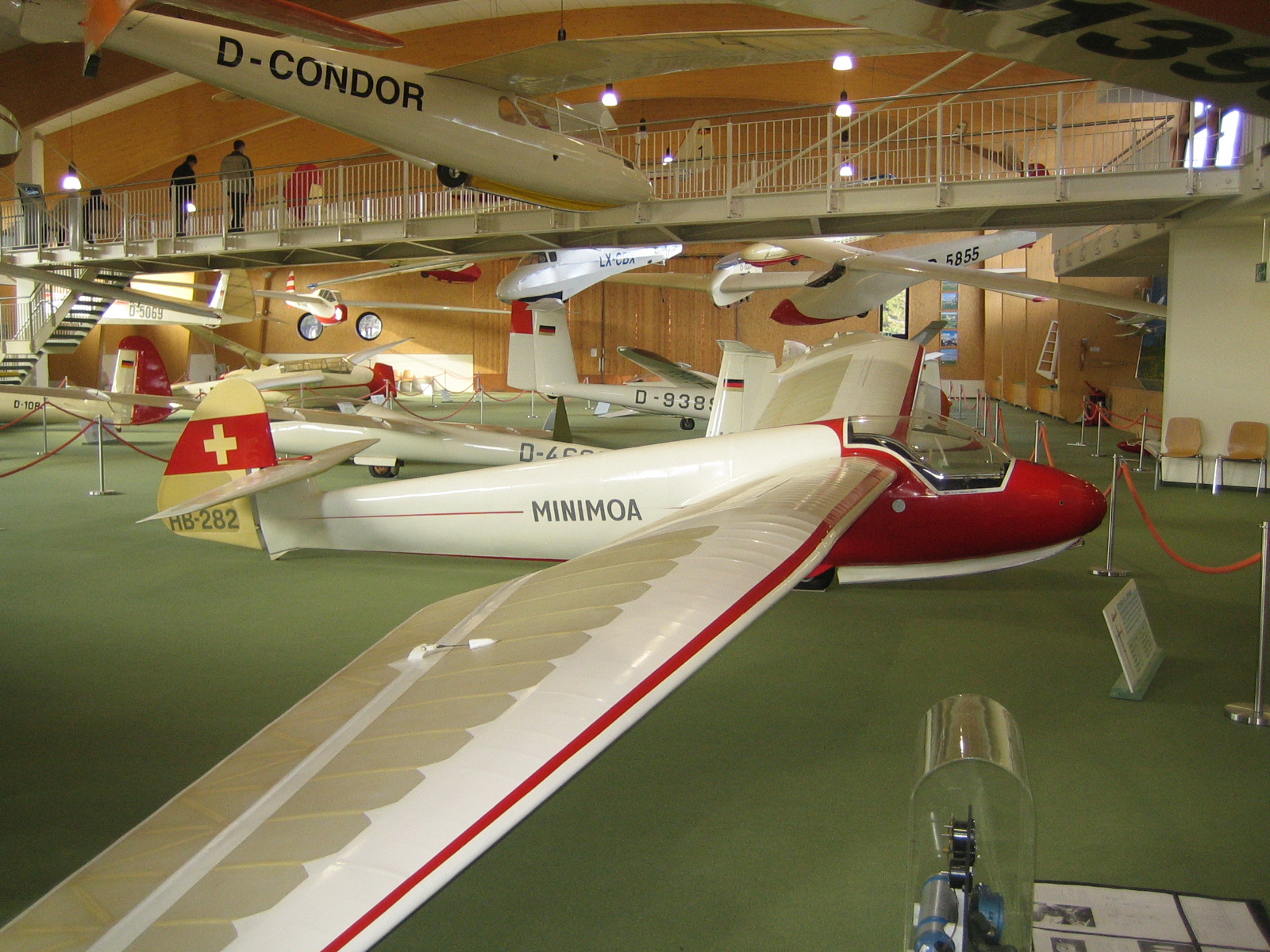
Göppingen Gö 3 Minimoa, on display in the Deutsches Segelflugmuseum

General characteristics

- Crew: 1
- Length: 7 m (23 ft 0 in)
- Wingspan: 17 m (55 ft 9 in)
- Wing area: 19.05 m^{2} (205.1 sq ft)
- Aspect ratio: 16:1
- Airfoil: Göttingen 681 - root, Göttingen 693 - tip
- Empty weight: 245 kg (540 lb)
- Max takeoff weight: 350 kg (772 lb)

Performance

- Never exceed speed: 219 km/h (136 mph, 118 kn)
- Maximum glide ratio: 28:1 at 72 km/h (45 mph)
- Rate of sink: 0.61 m/s (120 ft/min) at 60 km/h (37 mph)
- Wing loading: 18.37 kg/m^{2} (3.76 lb/sq ft)

== See also ==
- Schempp-Hirth

Related development

- Göppingen Gö 1

Related lists

- List of gliders
