= Schneider Moazagotl =

German single-seat glider, 1933

Moazagotl

General information
- Type: Competition glider
- National origin: Germany
- Manufacturer: Edmund Schneider, Grunau (ESG)
- Designer: Friedrich Wenk
- Number built: 1

History
- First flight: 1933

The Schneider Grunau 7 Moazagotl was a high-performance sailplane designed in Germany in 1933 specifically for fast, long distance flying using strong thermals. In 1937 it came second in the first World Gliding Championships, having previously made a flight of 300 km (186 mi).

== Design and development ==
Wolf Hirth was one of the first pilots to understand the glider characteristics necessary for cross-country flying on days with separated, strong thermals. It had to be equipped with a ballast tank to fly fast between thermals and be stable and efficient in the continuous, lift-gaining circling within the thermals, calling for high-aspect ratio wings with dihedral. He commissioned Edmund Schneider to build a one-off example, to be designed by Friedrich Wenk.

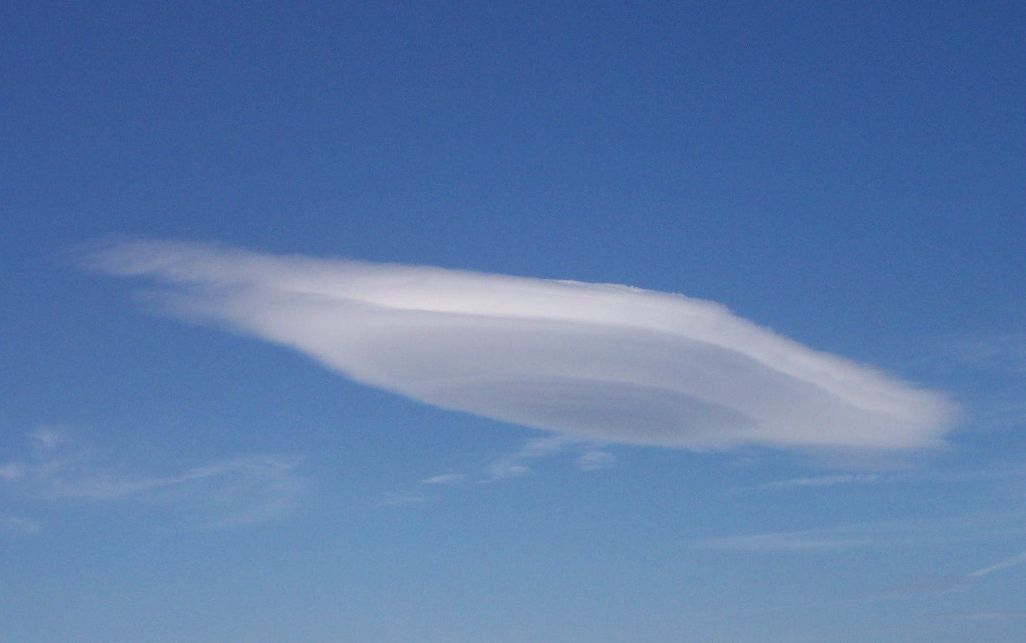
Lenticular cloud Moazagotl

The result was the Moazagotl. Moazagotl was the nickname of Gottlieb Motz, who was a farmer in the Silesian countryside near the Schneider works. He had noticed that with the wind in a particular direction, cloud formed over a nearby valley remained stationary even though the wind was strong. The phenomenon was communicated to meteorologists at an observatory near Breslau and their director passed on the observations to the glider pilots at Grunau, who thus became the first to exploit wave lift.

The Moazagotl was a high gull wing glider. The inner third of the span carried a dihedral of about 8° and was rectangular in plan. Single, broad-chord faired lift struts on each side braced these sections from about 20% of the span to the lower fuselage. Outboard the wing had no dihedral and was strongly swept on the leading edge, resulting in marked taper. Long ailerons occupied the whole trailing edge of each outer panels; these were slightly tapered and projected behind the trailing edge of the inner sections. The wing was built around a single, swept main spar which was straight in plan, simplifying its change in direction between the inner and outer panels. Diagonal sub-spars ran inwards and rearwards from it between the lift strut attachment points and the fuselage. Plywood skinning forward of these spars around the leading edge formed a D-box; aft, the wing, including the aileron, was fabric covered.

Its fuselage was ply covered and roughly oval in cross section, with a somewhat pointed nose and tapering gently and uniformly from wing to tail. The cockpit, just ahead of the leading edge, was enclosed by a plywood cover in Musterle fashion, providing illumination and limited views through small windows and portholes. Instrumentation was generous, including a variometer though lacking an artificial horizon for cloud flying. 50 kg (110 lb) of water ballast was contained in a tank behind the pilot's seat. At the rear a tapered all moving tailplane was mounted just above the fuselage and far enough forward to need only a small cut out for rudder movement. All tail surfaces were largely fabric covered, with ply leading edges. There was no fin but the balanced rudder was much increased in chord and area after early flight tests demonstrated the power of the ailerons. The Moazagotl landed on a slender skid that reached from nose to mid chord, assisted by a faired tail skid.

== Operational history ==
The Moagazotl competed in the 1933 Rhön (Wasserkuppe) competition, where Hirth made the longest flight, a distance of 180 km (112 mi). The following year he flew it 300 km (186 mi), only the second plot to achieve this distance. In the 1937 competition, retrospectively recognised as the first of the World Gliding Championships, Ludwig Hofmann flew the four years old Moazagotl into second place. It also made a visit to Brazil. The sole example was preserved in the Hornberg Museum until the end of World War II, when it was deliberately burned to prevent it falling into allied hands.

== Specifications ==
Data from Sailplanes 1920–1945 (2009) p.95 (General), Die Berühmteten Segelflugzeue p.55, Flugzeug-Typenbuch. Handbuch der deutschen Luftfahrt- und Zubehör-Industrie 1944

General characteristics

- Crew: One
- Length: 7.035 m (23 ft 1 in)
- Wingspan: 20.00 m (65 ft 7 in)
- Height: 1.3 m (4 ft 3 in)
- Wing area: 20 m^{2} (220 sq ft)
- Length de-rigged: 10 m (33 ft)
- Width de-rigged (without tailplane): 0.6 m (2 ft 0 in)
- Width de-rigged (with tailplane): 3 m (10 ft)
- Height de-rigged: 1.35 m (4 ft 5 in)
- Aspect ratio: 20
- Airfoil: Göttingen 535
- Empty weight: 190 kg (419 lb)
- Gross weight: 270 kg (595 lb) without ballast

320 kg (705 lb) with ballast

Performance

- Stall speed: 45 km/h (28 mph, 24 kn)
- Never exceed speed: 150 km/h (93 mph, 81 kn)
- Maximum winch launch speed: 80 km/h (50 mph; 43 kn)
- Maximum aero tow speed: 120 km/h (75 mph; 65 kn)
- g limits: +10 (ulitimate) without ballast

+8 (ulitimate) with ballast

- Maximum glide ratio: 23:1 at 55 km/h (34 mph; 30 kn)
- Rate of sink: 0.58 m/s (114 ft/min) at 48 km/h (30 mph; 26 kn)
- Wing loading: 13.5 kg/m^{2} (2.8 lb/sq ft) without ballast

16 kg/m^{2} (3 lb/sq ft) with ballast
