= Schneider ES-59 =

Australian single-seat glider

ES-59 Arrow

General information
- Type: Sailplane
- National origin: Australia
- Manufacturer: Schneider Pty Ltd
- Designer: Edmund Schneider
- Number built: 10

History
- First flight: 14 April 1962

The Schneider ES-59 Arrow is a sailplane designed and manufactured in Adelaide, South Australia in the early 1960s. The Arrow was manufactured with a one-piece wing of 13.23 metres span. It was the first Australian-built sailplane to compete in the World Gliding Championships, 1963 in Argentina. The Arrow has wood/fabric wings and tail and a wood fuselage. It has a fixed main wheel and a nose skid.

== Specifications ==
Data from The World's Sailplanes:Die Segelflugzeuge der Welt:Les Planeurs du Monde Volume II

General characteristics

- Crew: 1
- Length: 6.8 m (22 ft 4 in)
- Wingspan: 13.24 m (43 ft 5 in)
- Wing area: 11 m^{2} (120 sq ft)
- Aspect ratio: 16
- Airfoil: Root: NACA 63 618, Mid: NACA 63 614, Tip: Joukowsky 12% mod.
- Empty weight: 170 kg (375 lb)
- Gross weight: 280 kg (617 lb)

Performance

- Stall speed: 59.5 km/h (37.0 mph, 32.1 kn)
- Never exceed speed: 238 km/h (148 mph, 129 kn)
- Rough air speed max: 138.5 km/h (86.1 mph; 74.8 kn)
- Aerotow speed: 130 km/h (80.8 mph; 70.2 kn)
- Winch launch speed: 115 km/h (71.5 mph; 62.1 kn)
- Terminal velocity: with full airbrakes 232 km/h (144 mph; 125 kn)
- g limits: +5 -2.5 at 138.5 km/h (86.1 mph; 74.8 kn), +4 -0 at 250 km/h (155.3 mph; 135.0 kn)
- Maximum glide ratio: 27.8 at 76 km/h (47.2 mph; 41.0 kn)
- Rate of sink: 0.73 m/s (144 ft/min) at 68 km/h (42.3 mph; 36.7 kn)
- Wing loading: 25.5 kg/m^{2} (5.2 lb/sq ft)

== See also ==
Related development

- Schneider Grunau Baby
- Schneider ES-52 Kookaburra
- Schneider ES-60 Boomerang
- Schneider ES-65 Platypus
