= Schneider ES-49 =

German two-seat glider, 1951

General information
- Type: Two seat trainer glider
- National origin: Germany
- Manufacturer: Alexander Schleicher
- Designer: Edmund Schneider
- Number built: 8 from Schleicher, 3 Wallabies and 2 Kangaroos

History
- First flight: late August 1951

The Schneider ES49 is a two-seat glider trainer, designed, first flown in late August 1951 and commercially produced in Germany but later built from plans by gliding clubs in Australia. A major redesign there led to the ES49B Kangaroo.

== Design and development ==
As the type number indicates, the ES-49 was designed by Edmund Schneider in 1949, though it did not fly until 1951. It is a tandem two seat training glider, rather like an enlarged Grunau Baby. After World War II the town of Grunau (Jeżów Sudecki) was part of Poland and Schneider no longer had his factory there. Instead, the ES-49 was built by Alexander Schleicher in Poppenhausen, at the foot of the famous gliding site of the Wasserkuppe. In 1950, Schneider and his family moved to Australia to build another series of gliders of his own design.

The ES-49 is a wood framed high wing braced monoplane, covered with a mixture of plywood and fabric. It has a two part wing, built around a single box spar with ply skinning from it around the leading edge to form a torsion resisting D-box. Drag forces are taken by diagonal internal struts from the spar to the wing root, with the ply skin locally continuing aft to that strut. The rest of the wing is fabric covered, including the ailerons. In plan the wing has a rectangular centre section, occupying about 40% of the span and braced from below at about 25% of the overall span by airfoil section lift struts from the lower fuselage. Outboard, the wings are double straight tapered, with most of the sweep on the trailing edge, and end in blunt tips. Ailerons fill the whole trailing edge of these outer panels. Schempp-Hirth airbrakes are fitted immediately behind the spar near the outer ends of the centre section. The wing has 1.5° of dihedral.

The fuselage of the ES-49 is a deep sided hexagon apart from the nose ahead of the cockpit, where an extra singly curved, horizontal panel is inserted for greater visibility. The aft seat is under the leading edge of the wing. Initially the ES-49 had separate, open cockpits but the first prototype later had a multi-panelled canopy enclosing the forward seat but not that of the instructor. The second prototype had a canopy which enclosed both occupants, an arrangement adopted by production aircraft which have tubular steel framed glazing, with a short, upward hinged section for the instructor who also has under wing side windows and an overhead transparency in the leading edge. The fuselage tapers to the rear, where the straight tapered, blunt tipped tailplane and elevators, covered with a mixture of ply and fabric, are mounted on top. A long trim tab fills the trailing edge of the starboard elevator. Since the elevator hinge is ahead of the fin, only a small cut-out for rudder movement is required. The fin is narrow and short, mounting a balanced rudder with a straight tapered trailing edge and rounded tip which reaches down to the keel. The second prototype had a shorter fuselage and so had a larger area, almost finless, double straight tapered rudder but the production ES-49s reverted to the first prototype's longer fuselage and smaller rudder. The ES-49 lands on a single semi-recessed, unbraked monowheel, assisted under the nose and cockpit by a sprung skid and by a smaller skid under the tail.

After his move to Australia, Schneider designed a significantly different version of the ES-49, the longer span (18.00 m (59 ft 0.7 in)) ES-49B Kangaroo. The new wing, though similar in construction to the earlier one, was different in plan with a shorter rectangular centre section and proportionately longer tapered outer panels with shorter ailerons. This alteration placed the spoilers in the tapered sections. The fuselage was also revised, with rounded skinning on the upper nose instead of the earlier three flat panels, together with considerable revision of the rear fuselage. The upper fuselage profile was made straight and horizontal and the underside arched upwards, producing a more slender structure. There were detailed changes to the tail, too with a fuller and more curved rudder and the trim tab shortened and moved to the port side. Two Kangaroos were built, the second with slightly revised cockpit framing.

== Operational history ==
The ES-49 first flew in August 1951 and a second prototype was also built and tested before the production form with a long fuselage and canopy was reached with the third example. Only six ES-49s were built in Germany; clubs, the main customers for the relatively expensive two seaters, were looking for an aircraft capable of sustaining the rigours of beginners' handling and to easy to repair, making metal framed gliders more attractive. Schleichers therefore decided to concentrate their efforts on their Ka.4 Rhönlerche, which flew for the first time in December 1953.

In Australia Schneider sold plans for the ES-49 and three were built by clubs, under the name Wallaby. One of these was still flying in 2002.

The Kangaroo first flew in February 1953. It appeared at pageants and was used for passenger pleasure flights, occasionally carrying two in the rear cockpit, before its sale to a farmer in New South Wales. The first leg of its delivery flight set a new Australian national distance record for a two seater of 327 km (203 mi). The second Kangaroo was bought by the Dubbo gliding club in New South Wales the following year.

== Variants ==
ES-49 V.1
First prototype with open cockpits, first flown at the end of August 1951. Later fitted with a canopy around the forward cockpit but no rear glazing.
ES-49 V.2
Second prototype, with short fuselage.
ES-49
German production version, with longer fuselage and full canopy. Six built.
ES-49 Wallaby
Australian glider club construction from plans. Three built.
ES-49B Kangaroo
Longer span Australian variant from Edmund Schneider Australia Ltd, with 18 m (59 ft 1 in) span wing and revised fuselage. Two built

== Aircraft on display ==
- Deutsches Segelflugmuseum mit Modellflug (German Gliding Museum), Wasserkuppe - ES-49 D-5069

== Specifications (ES-49) ==
Data from Rhönsegler (1988) p.24

General characteristics

- Crew: Two
- Length: 8.61 m (28 ft 3 in)
- Wingspan: 16.0 m (52 ft 6 in)
- Wing area: 21.3 m^{2} (229 sq ft)
- Aspect ratio: 11.74
- Airfoil: Göttingen 549 on inner panels, Göttingen 676 outboard
- Empty weight: 280 kg (617 lb)
- Gross weight: 480 kg (1,058 lb)

Performance

- Never exceed speed: 150 km/h (93 mph, 81 kn)
- Minimum control speed: 50 km/h (31 mph, 27 kn)
- Maximum glide ratio: best, 24:1 at 70 km/h (43 mph)
- Rate of sink: 0.85 m/s (167 ft/min) minimum, with two crew at 62 km/h (39 mph)
- Wing loading: 21.6 kg/m^{2} (4.4 lb/sq ft) with two crew
