= Schneider ES-56 Nymph =

Short span, Australian glider

ES-56 Nymph

General information
- Type: Single-seat glider
- National origin: Australia
- Manufacturer: Edmund Schneider Pty Australia
- Designer: Edmund Schneider
- Number built: 4

History
- First flight: December 1955

The Schneider ES-56 Nymph was a short span, Australian glider with a laminar flow wing, built in the 1950s. Only four were built.

== Design and development ==
The Nymph, with its 11.9 m (39 ft 1 in) span laminar flow wing was designed by Edmund Schneider, who had emigrated from Germany in 1950 and built them in his Australian factory.

It was wooden framed and mostly covered with plywood, though parts of the wing and all the rear control surfaces were fabric covered. Its one piece high wing was built around a single spar, well set back from the leading edge and with closely spaced (210 mm (8.3 in)) ribs to preserve the laminar flow profile of the ply covered forward part. This covering included the plain, upper surface hinged ailerons and a torsion resisting D-box around the leading edge from the spar. There was 2° of dihedral. In plan the wing was straight tapered with a taper ratio of 0.416 and 1° of sweep at the quarter chord line. Most Nymphs had very small endplates at their wing tips, though one was built with traditional blunt tips. Metal, Schempp-Hirth type spoilers, opening above and below the wing, were mounted just behind the spar at about one third span.

The fuselage of the Nymph was a plywood covered box formed with frames and stringers, with inward sloping sides, a central keel from nose to mid fuselage and an upper turtleback or semi-conical decking behind the wing trailing edge. The cockpit was ahead of the leading edge, with a single piece, blown perspex side opening canopy and an upper line that merged into the wing. On each side a secondary, D-shaped window gave some rearward vision. The Nymph's ply covered, straight tapered, horizontal tail was unusually far back on top of the fuselage, locating the tailplane, also ply skinned, aft of the fin with the elevators largely behind the rudder which ended above them. Its starboard elevator carried a trim tab. The vertical tail was straight edged, tapered and flat topped. There was an unsprung monowheel below the wing at about one third chord, semi-recessed into a rubber sprung skid which reached from the nose to the trailing edge. The Nymph without wing endplates also had its wheel mounted a little further forward and its skid removed. There was a miniature skid tail bumper rather than the usual cantilever tailskid.

== Operational history ==
The first flight of the Nymph was in December 1955. In the next month Harry Schneider, Edmund Schneider's eldest son, flew it 310 km (193 mi). It also had some aerobatic capabilities, being certified for loops, stall turns, spinning and rolls off the top. Despite these demonstrations of its capability, the Nymph proved less popular than its near contemporary, the even shorter span, less aerodynamically advanced Schneider ES-57 Kingfisher and only four were built.

== Variants ==
- Mk 1 The prototype. One built. Wing area slightly greater than the production version due to a bigger tip chord. Air brakes consist of upper and lower spoilers. The trim surface is centrally located on the elevator and there is a full-length skid for the main undercarriage
- Mk 2 Production version. Three built. Slightly higher aspect ratio wing than the prototype. Schemp - Hirth dive brakes, trim located on the right elevator, wheel and skid for the main undercarriage.

== Specifications ==
Data from The World's Sailplanes (1963) pp.24-5

General characteristics

- Crew: One
- Length: 5.92 m (19 ft 5 in)
- Wingspan: 11.90 m (39 ft 1 in)
- Height: 1.27 m (4 ft 2 in) over cockpit
- Wing area: 10.12 m^{2} (108.9 sq ft)
- Aspect ratio: 14
- Airfoil: NACA 63_{3}-618
- Empty weight: 151 kg (333 lb) equipped
- Gross weight: 241 kg (531 lb)
- Wing loading: 23.8 kg/m^{2} (5.73 lb/sqft)

Performance

- Maximum speed: 210 km/h (130 mph, 110 kn) smooth air, placard
- Maximum speed, rough air: 130 km/h (81 mph; 70 kn)
- Stall speed: 58 km/h (36 mph, 31 kn)
- g limits: 5 (at V_{A}) /–2.5 (at V_{D})
- Rate of sink: 0.81 m/s (159 ft/min) minimum, at 69 km/h (43 mph; 37 kn)
- Lift-to-drag: maximum 25 at 84 km/h (52 mph; 45 kn)
- Winch launch speed: 105 km/h (65 mph; 57 kn)
- Aero-tow speed: 115 km/h (71 mph; 62 kn)
