= Schneider Grunau 9 =

German single-seat glider, 1928

Grunau 9
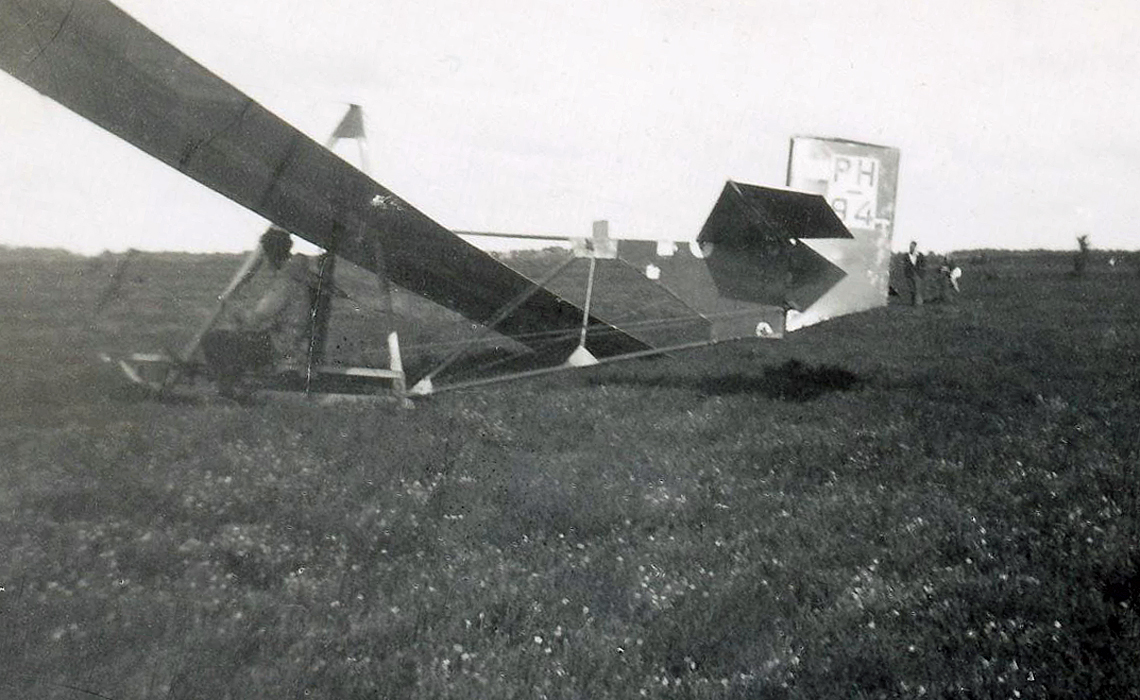
- Later version with vertical backrest strut within the A-frame

General information
- Type: Single seat primary glider
- National origin: Germany
- Manufacturer: Edmund Schneider, Grunau (ESG)
- Designer: Edmund Schneider

History
- First flight: 1928

The ESG Grunau 9, later designated as the ESG 29 and, after 1933, the DFS 108-10, was among the first primary gliders built in Germany in the late 1920s. It was widely produced and sold.

== Design and development ==
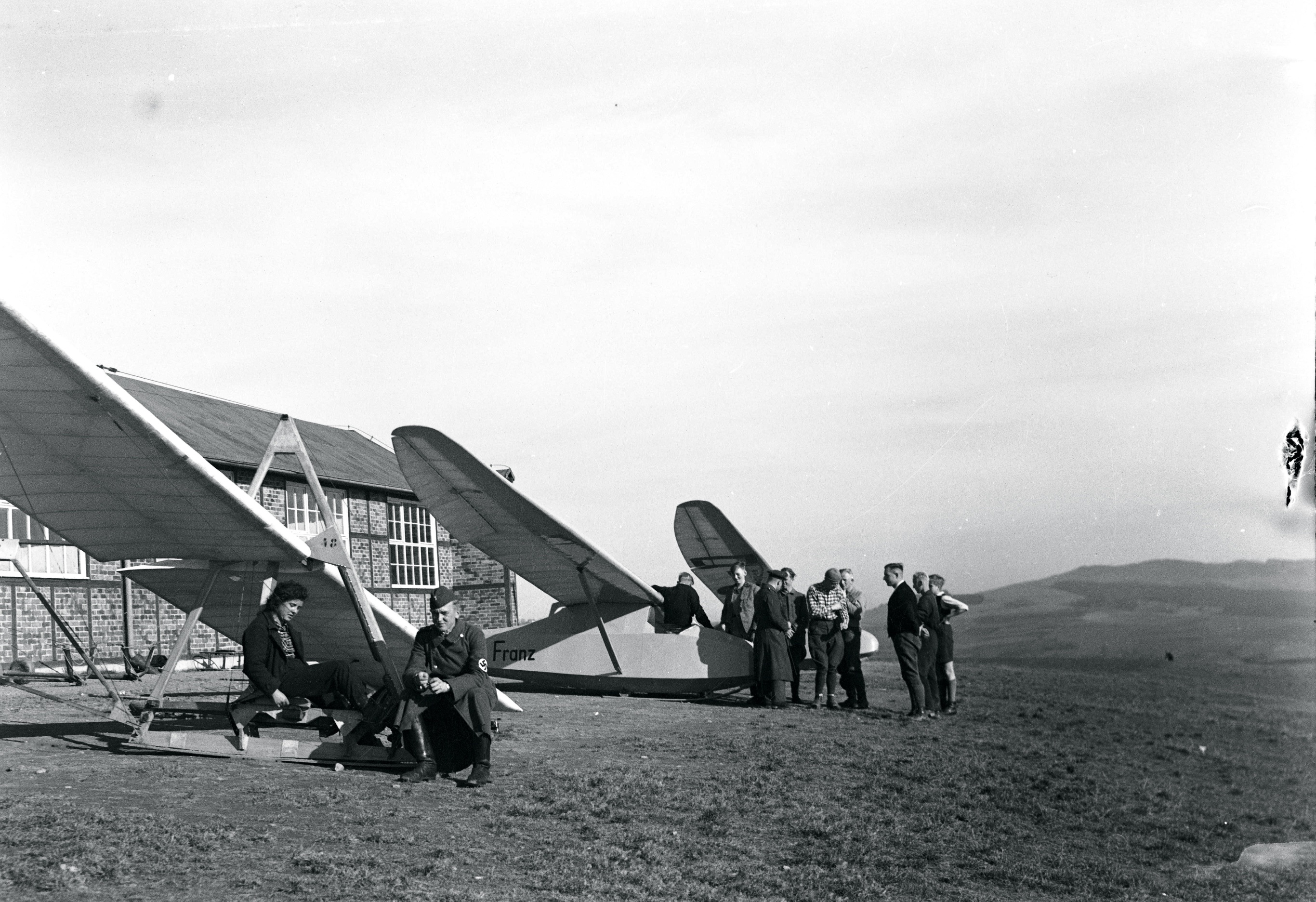
Grunau 9 in the foreground in front of the workshop in Grunau, near Hirschberg, Lower Silesia

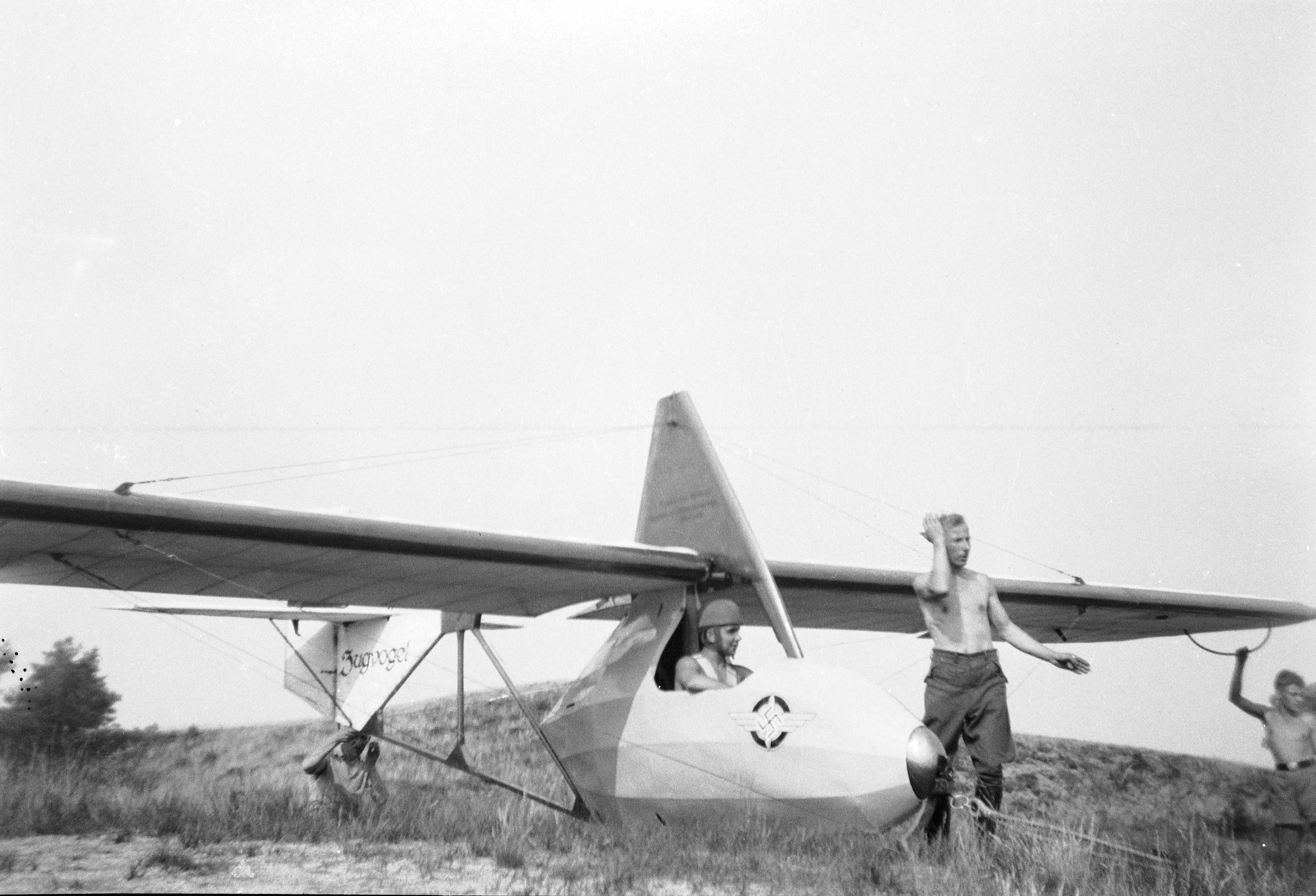
Grunau 9 of the German Air Sports Association (DLV) with aerodynamic fairings and with a suspended fork rope for the bungee launch, ca. mid-1930s

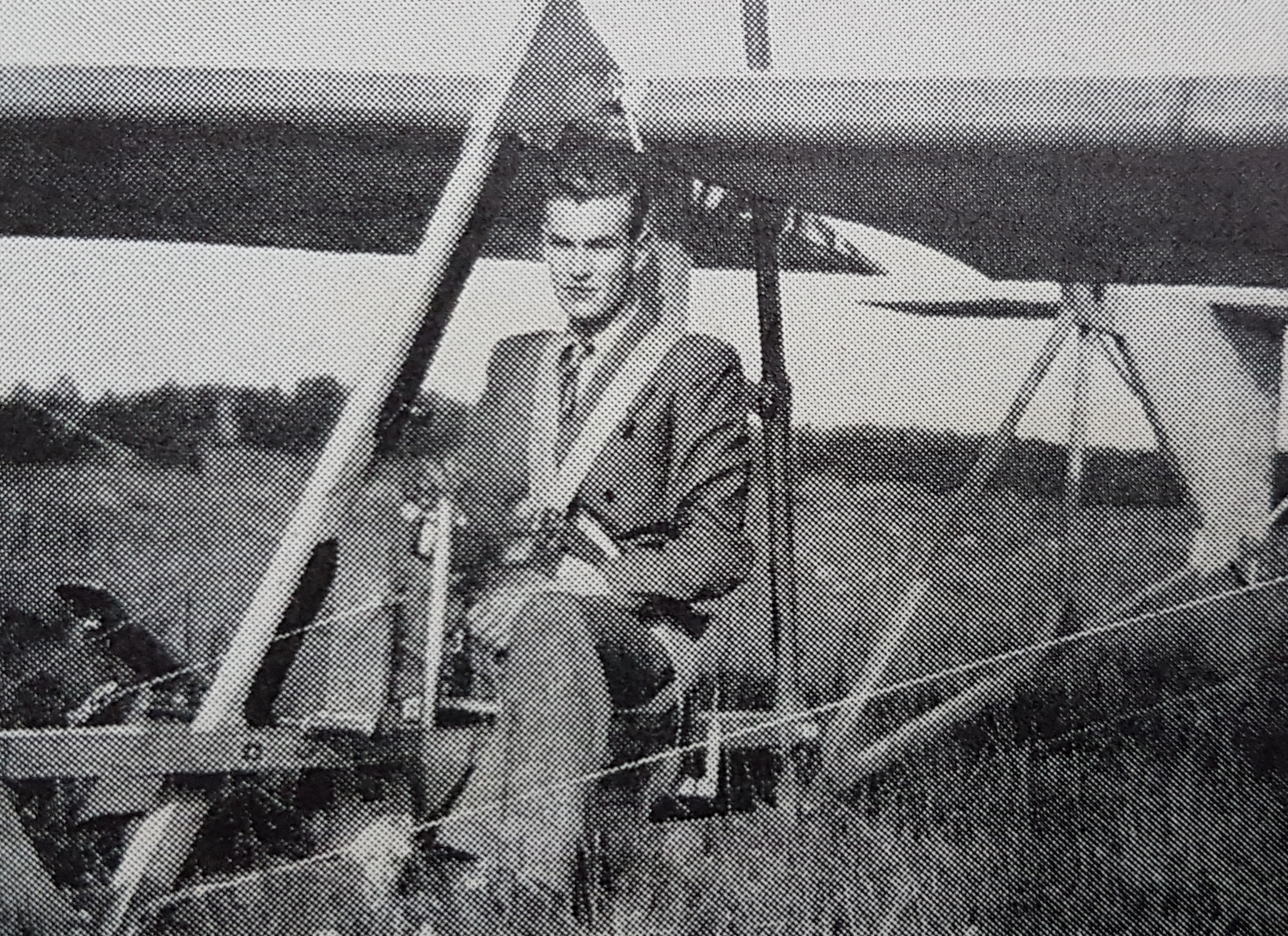
Swedish glider pilot and competitor Stig Fägerblad seated in a Grunau 9 cockpit, ca. 1940

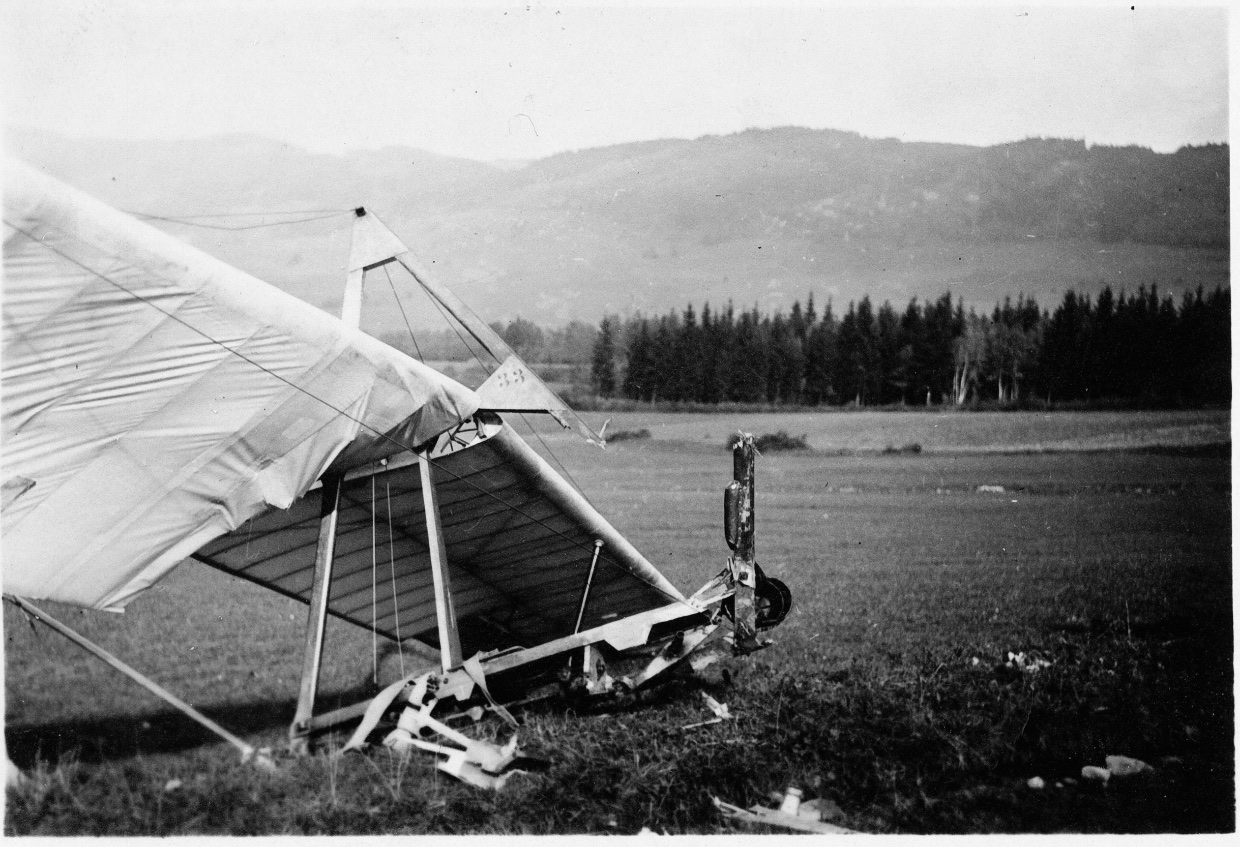
A Grunau 9 glider after a crash landing

=== Overview ===
The Grunau 9 was a German single-seat trainer glider, among the first in a group later known as primary gliders. It was developed by Edmund Schneider based on the Espenlaub primary glider, which itself was influenced by Alexander Lippisch's earlier designs, including the Hols der Teufel glider (English: 'Damn it' or 'Devil take it'). The German phrase Hols der Teufel is linked to two Swedish students in Lippisch's Wasserkuppe workshops, who would often curse using Djävaler Anamma whenever they inadvertently struck their hands with a hammer. The Grunau 9 was produced in significant numbers and sold widely.

=== Fuselage design ===
The fuselage of the aircraft featured a flat frame design, centered around a horizontal beam approximately 2 meters (6 feet 7 inches) in length. Two converging struts were attached to this beam, forming an overall vertical A-frame. The structure was a simple, sturdy, uncovered lattice fuselage paired with a rectangular wing, designed for easy replication at low material cost.

The downward-sloping extremities of these beams supported a slightly deeper horizontal box structure beneath the cross beam, housing the open pilot's seat and controls. Some later models incorporated an additional vertical member linking the lower cross beam to the wing root, serving as a backrest for the pilot. Others enclosed the pilot within a lightweight, short nacelle positioned between the nose and the backrest strut.

=== Tail structure ===
The rear section of the fuselage was constructed using two elongated beams extending toward the tail. The upper beam was horizontal and connected to both A-frame struts near their apex, while the lower beam angled upward, attaching to the rear-sloping portion of the A-frame just below the cross-member. These rear fuselage beams were reinforced with three cross-struts—one vertical strut located midway to the tail, dividing the space into two bays, and two diagonal struts providing additional structural integrity. The rear bay featured a short vertical strut between the upper and diagonal members.

For landings, a skid was installed, spanning the three projecting ends of the forward and lower A-frame, ensuring stability upon touchdown.

=== Wing design ===
The Grunau 9 featured nearly rectangular, two-spar, wooden-structured, two-piece wings. They were fabric-covered except for the leading edges, which were reinforced with plywood. Short, simple rectangular ailerons with cropped ends extended to the square wingtips. These were mounted on the upper fuselage beam, with their leading edges positioned at the forward-sloping member, leaving a chordwise gap between their roots.

Each wing was braced with a pair of landing wires running from the apex of the A-frame to the upper wing at outboard points on the forward and aft spars. Additionally, pairs of flying wire extended from below the wing to the lower horizontal A-frame member. Bracing wires from the wing's rear spars to the tail helped restrain lateral movement.

=== Tail and control surfaces ===
The vertical rudder hinge was located at the end of the fuselage. The rudder itself was rectangular, except for its sloping lower edge. A triangular tailplane was mounted on the upper horizontal fuselage beam, with the elevator hinge aligned with the rudder's. The rectangular elevators required a cut-out to accommodate rudder movement. Like the rudder and tailplane, the elevators were fabric-covered.

A tail fin was provided by the fabric covering that enclosed the near-triangular section of the rear fuselage, positioned between the rudder hinge, the upper and lower beams, and the diagonal strut connecting them.

=== Development and variants ===
The Grunau 9 made its first flight in 1928. The following year, Schneider modified the tail and briefly introduced a naming convention based on the year, redesignating the aircraft as the ESG 29—though this designation was not exclusive to a single aircraft model.

Following the formation of the Deutsche Forschungsanstalt für Segelflug (DFS) in 1933, the aircraft was assigned the type number DFS 108-10. It earned the nickname Schädelspalter (English: 'Skull Splitter') due to a strut positioned in front of the pilot, which posed a risk of head injuries during landing. However, no documented incidents of severe injury resulting from this structural feature have been recorded.

=== Legacy ===
In the succeeding SG 38 model, the pilot's seating position was revised, placing them in front of the lattice framework. The Grunau 9 was produced in large numbers and sold widely over several years. At least one Dutch-registered Grunau 9 remained in operation after World War II.

== Aircraft on display ==
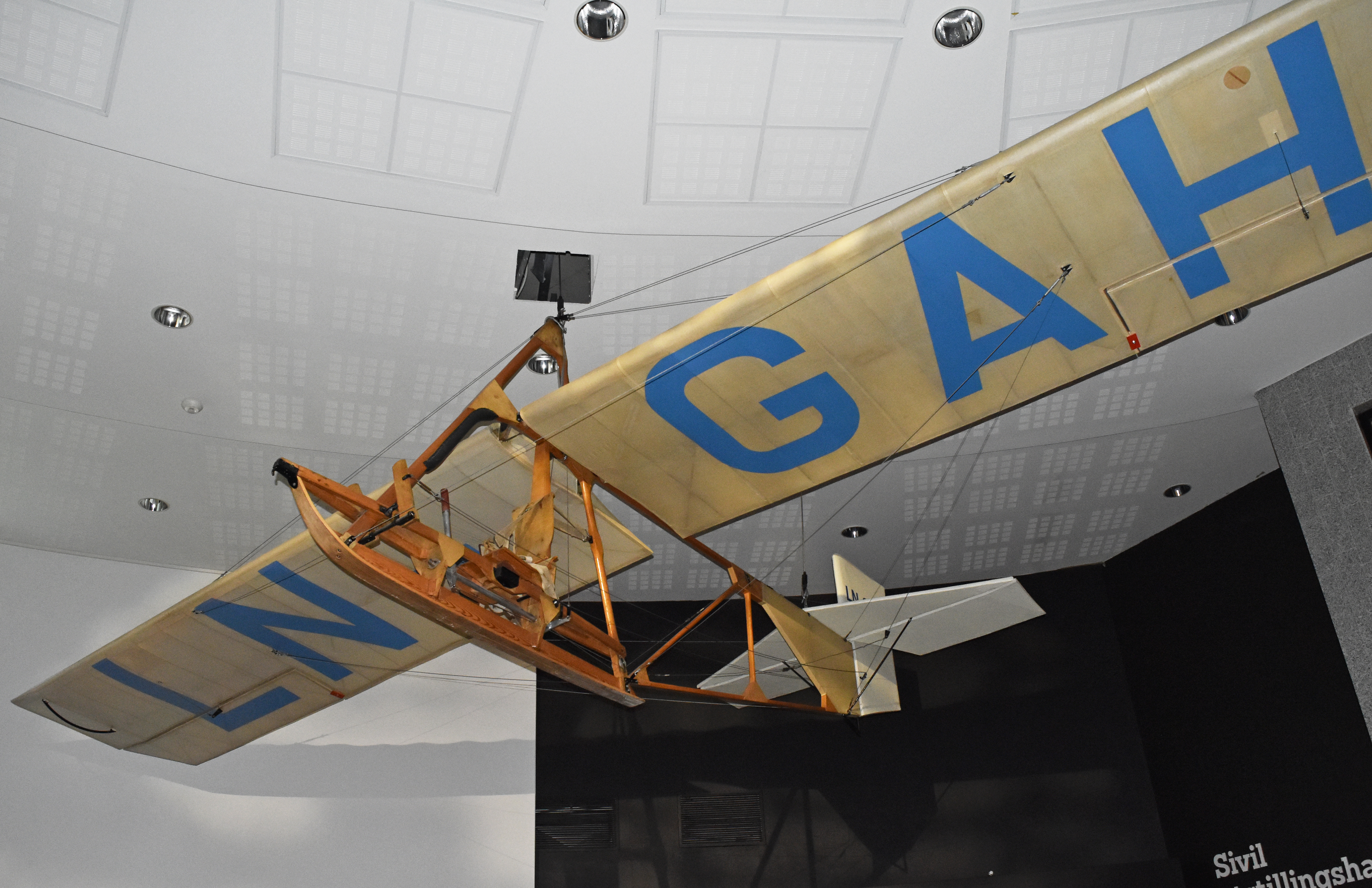
Grunau 9, built in 1940, in the Norwegian Aviation Museum

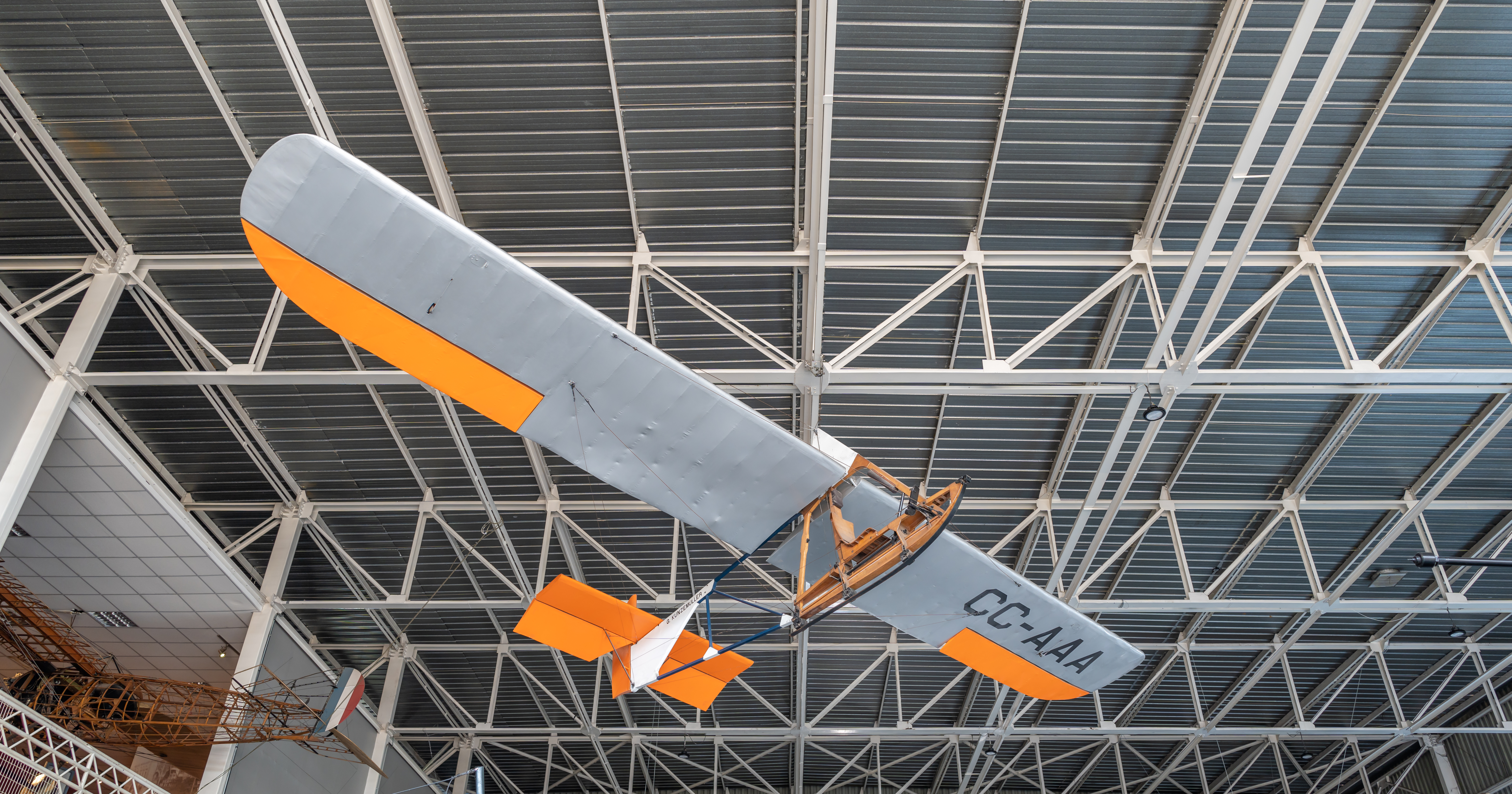
Grunau 9 on display at the National Aerospace Museum in Santiago, Chile, CC-AAA marked with the name 'G. Kunzemüller'

From: Aviation Museums and Collections of Mainland Europe (2009)

- Finnish Aviation Museum, Helsinki: G-36
- Icelandic Aviation Museum, Akureyri: Grunau IX "Valur". Built in 1938, still airworthy but last flown in June 2004.
- Norwegian Aviation Museum, Bodø: Grunau 9 LN-GAH
- Segelflyg Museum, Falköping: SE-27

These are original Grunau 9s. Other museums worldwide have originals not on public display, others have reproductions.

== Specifications (1930 model) ==
Data from Sailplanes (2006) (apart from span and length, from 1930 Schneider catalogue)

General characteristics

- Crew: One
- Length: 5.55 m (18 ft 3 in)
- Wingspan: 10.78 m (35 ft 4 in)
- Wing area: 16.06 m^{2} (172.9 sq ft)
- Aspect ratio: 7.2
- Empty weight: 86 kg (190 lb)
- Gross weight: 150 kg (331 lb) weights approximate

Performance

- Maximum glide ratio: 10:1
- Rate of sink: 1.3 m/s (260 ft/min) at 15 km/h (9 mph; 8 kn)
- Wing loading: 9.3 kg/m^{2} (1.9 lb/sq ft)

== See also ==
- Hanna Reitsch
