= Schneider ES-52 =

Australian two-seat glider, 1952

ES-52 Kookaburra

General information
- Type: Two-seat sailplane
- National origin: Australia
- Manufacturer: Edmund Schneider Pty Australia
- Designer: Edmund Schneider
- Number built: 44

History
- First flight: 20 June 1954

External image
- Schneider ES-52B “Kookaburra”

The Schneider ES-52 Kookaburra is an Australian two-seat training sailplane of the 1950s and 1960s. It was designed by Edmund Schneider, the designer of the Grunau Baby, who had emigrated to Adelaide, South Australia following the end of the Second World War.

The Kookaburra is a cantilever high-winged monoplane of wooden construction, with staggered side-by-side seating under a perspex canopy. The first example flew on 20 June 1954. It was available in both short and long wingspan versions and was widely used by Australian gliding clubs in the 1960s.

== Variants ==
ES-52 Mk.I
Initial production, 4 built.
ES-52 Mk.II
Eleven built.
ES-52 Mk.III
Eight built.
ES-52 Mk.IV
17 built by 1964.
ES-52B
A 14.86 m (48 ft 9 in) span version of the Kookaburra with a completely revised three piece wing. Four aircraft built.

== Specifications (ES 52 Mk.IV) ==
Data from The World's Sailplanes:Die Segelflugzeuge der Welt:Les Planeurs du Monde Volume II

General characteristics

- Crew: 2
- Length: 7.90 m (25 ft 11 in)
- Wingspan: 11.70 m (38 ft 5 in)
- Height: 1.48 m (4 ft 10 in)
- Wing area: 15.0 m^{2} (161 sq ft)
- Aspect ratio: 9.13
- Airfoil: Root: Go 549, Tip: M-12
- Empty weight: 220 kg (485 lb)
- Gross weight: 393 kg (866 lb)

Performance

- Stall speed: 61 km/h (38 mph, 33 kn)
- Never exceed speed: 220 km/h (140 mph, 120 kn)
- Rough air speed max: 151 km/h (94 mph; 82 kn)
- Aerotow speed: 113 km/h (70 mph; 61 kn)
- Winch launch speed: 113 km/h (70 mph; 61 kn)
- Terminal velocity: with full air-brakes at max all-up weight 208 km/h (129 mph; 112 kn)
- g limits:

+5 -2.5 at 142 km/h (76.7 kn), +4 -0 at 300 km/h (190 mph; 160 kn)

- Maximum glide ratio: 20:1 at 50 mph; 44 kn (81 km/h)
- Rate of sink: 1.05 m/s (207 ft/min) at 45 mph; 39 kn (72 km/h)
- Wing loading: 26.2 kg/m^{2} (5.4 lb/sq ft)

== See also ==
Related lists

- List of gliders

== See also ==
- Schneider Grunau Baby
- Schneider ES-59 Arrow
- Schneider ES-60 Boomerang
- Schneider ES-65 Platypus
