= Martin Schempp =

German engineer (1905–1984)

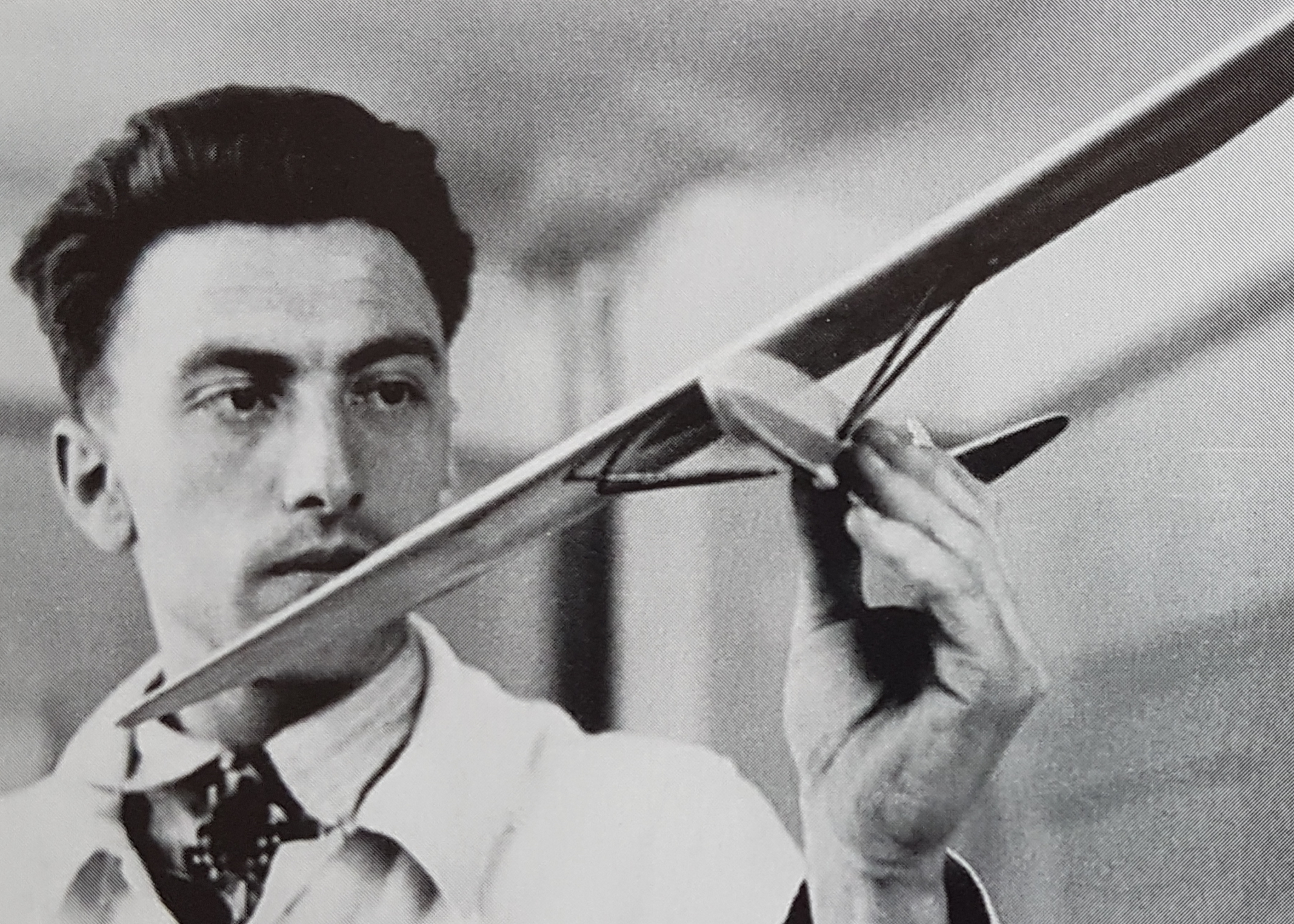
- photo by Friedel Schempp
- Born: 23 March 1905; Stuttgart, German Empire
- Died: 9 July 1984 (aged 79); Kirchheim unter Teck, West Germany
- Citizenship: German
- Known for: Schempp-Hirth gliders
- Scientific career
- Fields: Flight instructor, Aircraft designer

Martin Schempp (23 March 1905 - 9 July 1984) was a glider pilot and founder of Schempp-Hirth, a major manufacturer of gliders.

== First years ==
Martin Schempp was born in Stuttgart. After completing his commercial education, he helped out in his father's craftsman's business. In 1926, at the age of 21, he emigrated to the USA in the hope of finding better working conditions there. After working at various odd jobs, he finally found employment as a chemical laboratory technician at a steel mill. A talk by Charles Lindbergh about his Atlantic crossing so inspired Martin about aviation that he returned to Germany in 1928 to learn how to fly. After completing his basic soaring training, he acquired his pilot's license for powered aircraft at the Klemm company in Böblingen. It was during this time that he met Wolf Hirth, with whom he was to establish a close, lifelong friendship.

Martin Schempp returned 1929 to the USA to build German sailplane designs under license there at "Haller-Hirth Sailplanes" and to act as a soaring instructor at "Haller School Of Soaring Flight" in Pittsburgh (Greensburg Airport). Spectacular flights with a number of unintentional ditchings made him and soaring known in the USA. After his successes in the 2nd National Soaring Championships in Elmira, New York (which is America's equivalent to the Wasserkuppe, Germany's soaring Mecca) in 1931, he flew a distance of 63.7 miles and reached an altitude of 5,370 feet in this competition the following year. He won second place in the distance competition and first place in the altitude competition. Based on these successes, he earned silver C badge No. 8 (worldwide). He moved to California at the end of 1932, where he worked with Hawley Bowlus on his high-performance sailplane "Albatros".

In 1934, feeling that his professional prospects in the USA were too uncertain, Martin Schempp accepted an offer from Wolf Hirth, who was the head of the soaring school on the Hornberg at the time, to hire him as a soaring instructor there. With the assistance of Wolf Hirth, Martin Schempp opened in Göppingen his own company in 1935: "Sportflugzeugbau Göppingen Martin Schempp". Martin Schempp proved to be an adept and circumspect head of production, who would succeed over decades in working with his employees to build high-quality sailplanes inexpensively. The Gö 1 "Wolf" and Gö 3 "Minimoa" became world-renowned sailplanes. In 1938, Wolf Hirth, mainly responsible for the design work, officially became a partner in the company, which then took on the new name “Sportflugzeugbau Schempp-Hirth”. The company relocated to Kirchheim-Teck the same year. By 1939, the list of customers included clients from all continents except Australia. The Minimoa, 110 of which were built, is still regarded as one of the most beautiful sailplanes from the wood era. In 1939, Wolf Hirth opened his own company in Nabern, which collaborated closely with Schempp-Hirth during the war. In addition to sailplanes for pilot training, the two companies supplied the two-seater Gö IV (designed by Wolfgang Hütter); the Habicht (plane), an aerobatic glider, and wooden subassemblies for Messerschmitt, the Me-321/323 "Gigant" and the Me-109 fighter.

== After the war ==
In the eyes of the Americans, Martin Schempp had such great integrity and recognition that they appointed him the interim mayor of Kirchheim unter Teck after the war – despite the formal "burden" of him being the head of a production facility for military products. He was relieved by an elected mayor in 1945 and once again devoted all of his time to the factory, now to manufacture urgently needed furniture and household goods using aircraft materials saved through the end of war.

When gliders were allowed to fly again in Germany in 1951, he ceded the sailplane market to Wolf Hirth. Only after Wolf Hirths' death in 1959 did Schempp-Hirth increasingly become involved in sailplane construction in addition to the construction of powered aircraft undertaken with Wolf Hirths' consultation and assistance. Martin Schempp acquired the license to build the best standard-class sailplane of its time, the "Standard Austria," and put it into mass production. Martin Schempp soon realized that the future would belong to composite sailplanes, and he therefore secured the assistance of Klaus Holighaus. Klaus Holinghaus' first work for Schempp-Hirth was to increase the wingspan of the Standard Austria to produce the SHK with 17-m wings. Upon arriving in Kirchheim, Klaus Holighaus implemented his ideas in the form of the composite sailplane for the Open Class – the Cirrus. Martin Schempp gave him free rein in this matter, which Klaus Holighaus used to produce the (wildly) successful Cirrus, Nimbus, Standard Cirrus and Janus.

After handing over management of the factory in 1969 and control of the company in 1972, Martin Schempp fully transferred the Schempp-Hirth company to Klaus Holighaus in 1977 and withdrew after 42 years of actively shaping, directing and accompanying its fortunes – still following its growth and successes with great interest and involvement.

Martin Schempp died after a long illness on July 9, 1984.
