= Schneider ES-54 Gnome =

Experimental low cost glider

ES-54 Gnome

General information
- Type: Low cost soaring glider
- National origin: Australia
- Manufacturer: Edmund Schneider Pty Australia
- Designer: Harry Schneider
- Number built: 1

History
- First flight: 1 May 1955

The Schneider ES-54 Gnome was an experimental low cost glider with a laminar flow but low aspect ratio wing, built in Australia in the mid-1950s. Its performance was predictably poor and only one was completed.

== Design and development ==
The ES-54 Gnome was designed by Harry Schneider, Edmund Schneider's eldest son, as a response to urging by Fred Hoinville for small, cheap sailplanes that could nonetheless soar. Hoinville had flown in Australia's 1952 World Gliding Championships team. The Gnome was built to test the performance and handling of a glider with a wing of short span, very low aspect ratio (6.18), and laminar flow aerofoil.

The Gnome had a wood framed wing and a steel framed pod and boom fuselage, the whole covered in a mixture of plywood and fabric. Its cantilever, constant chord, high mounted wing was built around a single spar, placed at about 40% of the chord. Forward of the spar the wing was ply covered around the leading edge, forming a torsion resisting D-box. Behind the spar both wing and ailerons were fabric covered. The steel fuselage frame defined a nonohedral cross section, not including the keel, which with its fabric covering approximated a blunt oval. The cockpit was at the wing leading edge, with flat and single curvature panelled glazing which extended rearwards behind the leading edge, with side panels below the wing and an upper panel reaching into it for upwards vision. Near the trailing edge the outer fuselage framing simplified into four tubes forming a diamond cross section but also containing the boom, which emerged briefly (about 600 mm (23.6 in)) from the fuselage as it tapered away aft. A straight edged, constant chord horizontal tail, the tailplane ply-skinned and the inset elevators fabric covered was mounted on the boom. Its vertical tail extended both above and below the boom, overall forming an irregular pentagon, with the fin ply skinned and the rudder fabric covered. Both vertical fin and rudder were low aspect ratio and broad chord. A short, steel sprung landing skid reached from near the nose almost to the trailing edge.

The Gnome made its first flight, under aero-tow, on 1 May 1955. It handled safely and well but its performance was as poor as Schneider had predicted, its low aspect ratio wing producing high drag at the low speeds used in thermals. No soaring flights were made. During 1955, some alterations were made to the fuselage to clear the tail from the ground. When the Gnome was offered for manufacture in kit form no definite orders were received and development ended in 1956. The sole prototype then flew with the Port Pirie gliding club.

== Specifications ==
Data from Sailplanes 1945-1965 (2006) p.180

General characteristics

- Crew: One
- Length: 6.168 m (20 ft 3 in)
- Wingspan: 7.62 m (25 ft 0 in)
- Wing area: 9.4 m^{2} (101 sq ft)
- Aspect ratio: 6.18
- Empty weight: 95 kg (209 lb)
- Gross weight: 190 kg (419 lb)
- Wing loading: 20.2 kg/m^{2} (4.2 lb/sqft)
