= Moazagotl =

Form of lenticular cloud

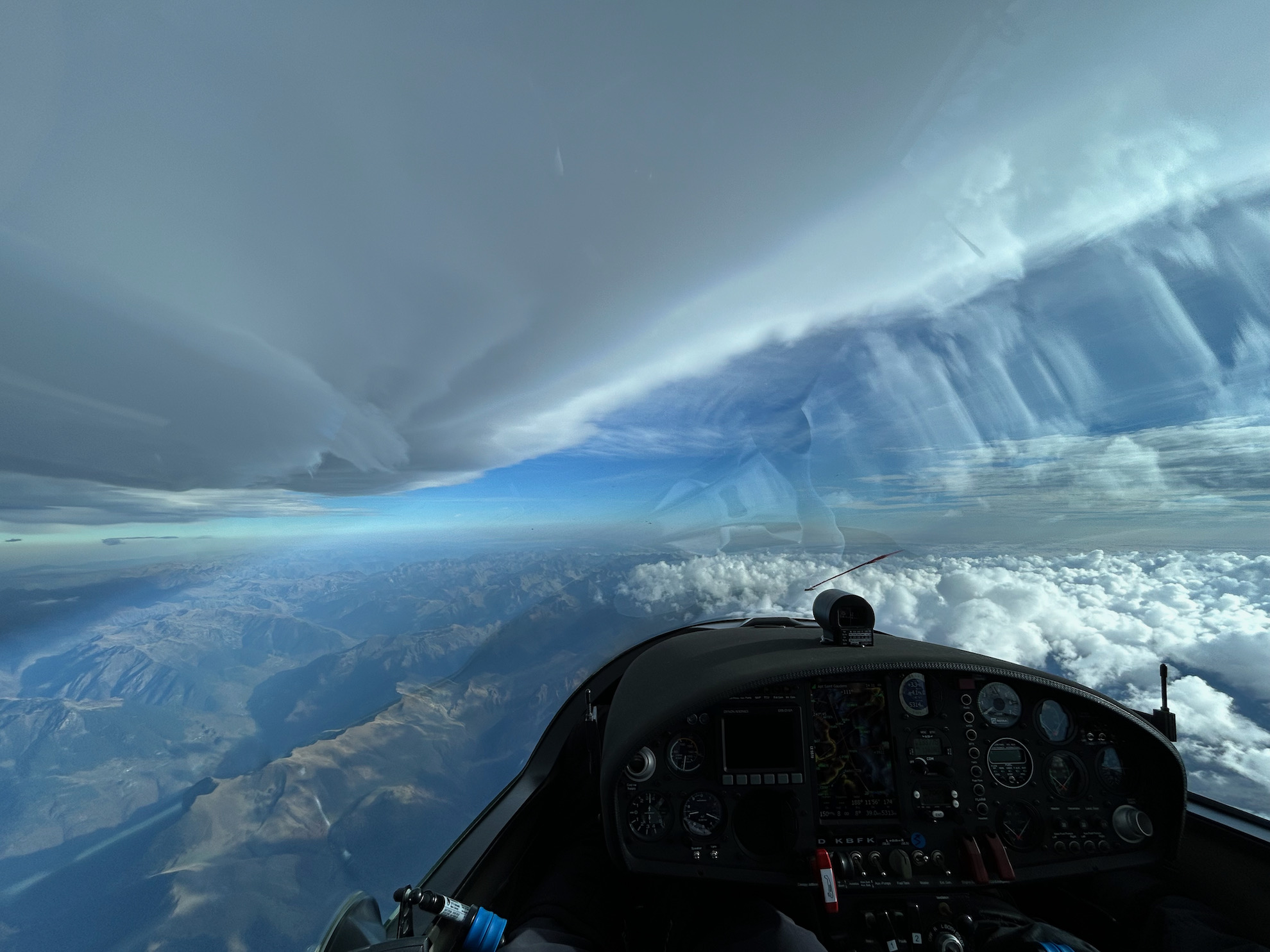
- Hedge of lenticular cloud called Moazagotl
- Abbreviation: Cc len
- Genus: Cirrocumulus
- Species: Lenticularis
- Classification: Family A (High-level)
- Precipitation: no

The Moazagotl is a stationary bank of cloud marking the upper portion of the system of orographic lenticular clouds formed by the foehn wind lee wave of mountains.

The name of the seemingly stationary cloud is thought to be derived from the name of a shepherd, Gottlieb Matz, literally the Matz family Gottlieb, who was known for describing them. It was first studied in 1933 by two German glider pilots, Hans Deutschmann and Wolf Hirth, on the northern (lee) side of the Giant Mountains in Silesia, a region part of Germany when discovered.

The Schneider Moazagotl sailplane of 1933 was named for this type of cloud. The name has sometimes been misspelled Moazagoatl, but its spelling does not include a third 'a;' the term refers to the cloud, rather than the wind that forms it.
