= Schneider ES-60 =

Australian single-seat glider

ES-60 Boomerang

General information
- Type: Sailplane
- National origin: Australia
- Manufacturer: Edmund Schneider Pty
- Designer: Harry Schneider
- Number built: approx 30

External image
- Schneider ES-60B “Super Arrow” on landing approach

The Schneider ES-60 Boomerang is a single-seat glider that was designed and manufactured in Australia in the 1960s. It is constructed of wood and fabric. It was designed and manufactured by Edmund Schneider Pty of Adelaide, South Australia. It has a fixed main wheel and a tail skid. The Boomerang has an all-moving, swept tailplane that resembles a boomerang and hence the name given to the ES-60. A version with a conventional straight stabiliser and moving elevator was also manufactured, called the ES-60B Super Arrow.

In the 1950s Edmund Schneider Pty Ltd manufactured a number of Schleicher Ka 6 gliders, under licence from Alexander Schleicher of Germany. However, the Ka 6 with its low wing loading proved to be unsuited as a competition glider in Australia's strong summer thermal conditions. The Gliding Federation of Australia asked Edmund Schneider to design and manufacture a competition sailplane better suited to Australian conditions. The result was the ES-60 Boomerang.

== Specifications ==
General characteristics

- Crew: One
- Wingspan: 15.00 m (49 ft 2.5 in)
- Wing area: 12.8 m^{2} (138 sq ft)
- Aspect ratio: 17.5
- Empty weight: 241 kg (531 lb)
- Gross weight: 347 kg (765 lb)

Performance

- Maximum glide ratio: 31.9
- Rate of sink: 0.72 m/s (141 ft/min)

== See also ==
Related development

- Schneider Grunau Baby
- Schneider ES-59 Arrow
- Schneider ES-52 Kookaburra
- Schneider ES-65 Platypus
