= Schneider ES-65 =

Australian two-seat glider prototype, 1965

ES-65 Platypus
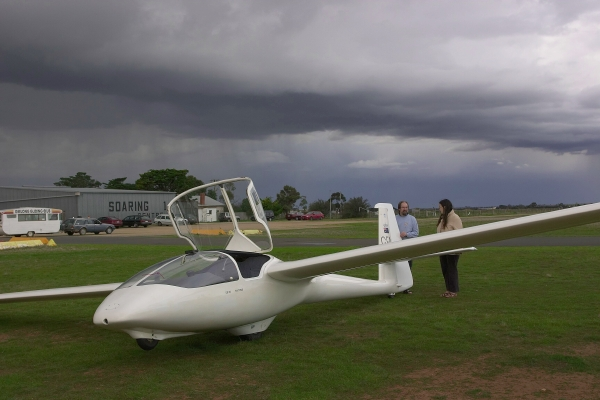

General information
- Type: Two seat advanced trainer
- National origin: Australia
- Manufacturer: Edmund Schneider Pty, Adelaide
- Designer: Harry Schneider
- Number built: 1

History
- First flight: August 1984

The Schneider ES-65 Platypus is a two-seater unflapped glider designed and built by Edmund Schneider Pty in Australia. A single prototype was built, which remains operational as of 2012.

== Design and development ==
The Edmund Schneider company was originally based in Grunau, Silesia but reformed after World War II in Adelaide, Australia, producing the successful Schneider ES-60 from 1960 until 1970. Anticipating an Australian market for an ES-60-based side by side two-seater Harry Schneider began design and construction of the ES-64, a marriage of ES-60 wings with a new glass reinforced plastic (GRP) fuselage. Australian gliding clubs showed little interest and the project proceeded slowly. In the early 1980s Schneider revived it with a simplified version, the ES-65 Platypus.

The Platypus has the extended plywood skinned ES-60 wing, built around a single spar. The leading edge is unswept but the straight trailing edges have forward sweep that increases on the outer, aileron-carrying, panels. There are airbrakes mounted just aft of the spar on the inner panels. These wings were mid-mounted onto a new GRP fuselage. This has a maximum width of 1.20 m (3 ft 11 in) to accommodate the side by side seating but narrowed in pod and boom style, particularly in plan, behind the wings. The cockpit has a two-piece fixed screen extending almost to the nose and is accessed via a rear hinged, bulged canopy. The pod includes a fixed, faired, centre-line two wheel undercarriage, with a brake-equipped mainwheel under the wings and a smaller nosewheel.

The tail is also mostly GRP, though the elevator uses carbon fibre for lightness. These surfaces are straight-edged and tapering, the fin is tall with a rudder that extends to the bottom of the fuselage. The high aspect ratio horizontal tail surface is mounted midway up the fin.

The Platypus made its first flight in August 1984 and its handling and performance were generally judged to be good. There were plans to produce an all-GRP version, but the funding required was not available and no more ES-65s were built.

== Operational history ==
The prototype, VH-GFA, is owned by a syndicate of members of the Geelong Gliding Club and of the Victorian Motorless Flight Group based at Bacchus Marsh airfield, Victoria. It was still operational in 2005.

== Specifications ==
Data from Sailplanes 1965-2005

General characteristics

- Crew: 2
- Length: 7.726 m (25 ft 4 in)
- Wingspan: 17.70 m (58 ft 1 in)
- Height: 1.7 m (5 ft 7 in)
- Wing area: 16.2 m^{2} (174 sq ft)
- Aspect ratio: 19.3
- Airfoil: Wortmann FX61-164 root, FX61-140 inboard of aileron, FX60-126 tip
- Empty weight: 400 kg (882 lb)
- Gross weight: 590 kg (1,301 lb)

Performance

- Maximum speed: 260 km/h (160 mph, 140 kn)
- Stall speed: 72 km/h (45 mph, 39 kn)
- Never exceed speed: 260 km/h (160 mph, 140 kn)
- Wing loading: 36.4 kg/m^{2} (7.5 lb/sq ft)
