= German Air Sports Association =

Nazi German sports organization

Pennant of the German Air Sports Association

The German Air Sports Association (Deutscher Luftsportverband, or DLV e. V.) was an organization that was founded in March 1933, shortly after the Nazi Party came to power. Officially, it served as the national umbrella organisation for air sports in Nazi Germany. In reality, it functioned as a covert means of developing military aviation in defiance of the Treaty of Versailles, which prohibited Germany from having an air force. The DLV provided training for future Luftwaffe pilots and personnel under the guise of civilian aviation activities. Its chairman was Bruno Loerzer, a World War I flying ace, while Hermann Göring, the Reich Minister of Aviation, played a key role in overseeing its operations.

In 1937, the DLV was succeeded by the National Socialist Flyers Corps (Nationalsozialistisches Fliegerkorps, NSFK), which continued to promote and oversee air sports and aviation training within the framework of the Nazi military apparatus. The NSFK played a key role in preparing Germany for aerial warfare and advancing the country's military aviation capabilities.

== History ==
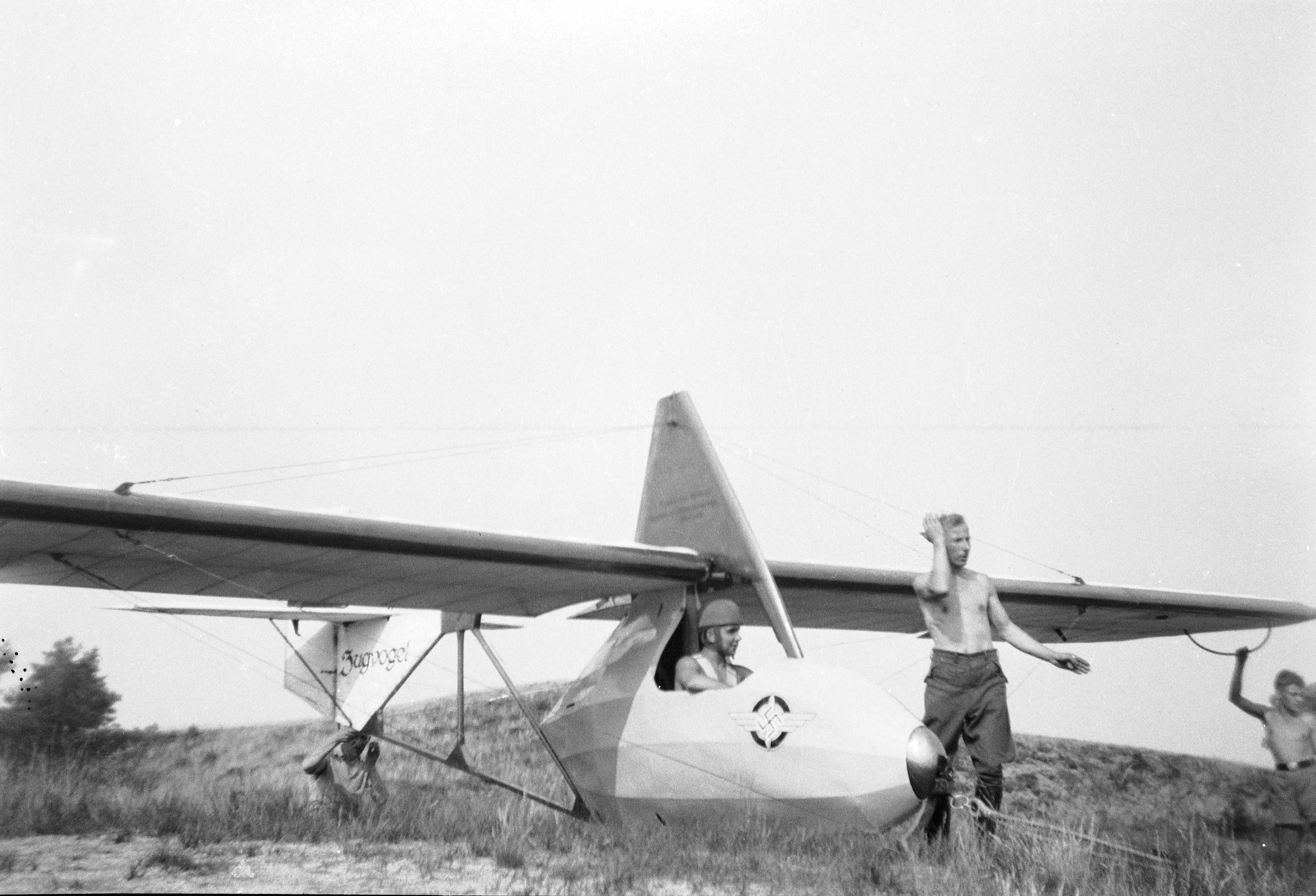
Schneider Grunau 9 training glider used for flight training by the DLV

Since the Treaty of Versailles officially forbade Germany from building fighter planes of any sort, the German Air Sports Association used gliders to train men still officially civilians for the future Luftwaffe. The first steps towards the Luftwaffe's formation were undertaken just months after Adolf Hitler came to power. Göring, a World War I ace with 22 victories and the holder of the Orden Pour le Mérite, became National Kommissar for aviation with former Deutsche Luft Hansa director Erhard Milch as his deputy. On 25 March 1933 the German Air Sports Association absorbed all private and national organizations, whilst retaining its 'sports' title. In April 1933 the Reichsluftfahrtministerium (RLM – Reich Air Ministry) was established. The RLM was in charge of development and production of aircraft, and soon afterwards the test site or Erprobungsstelle at Rechlin became its testing ground, a military airfield that had been first established in August 1918. Göring's control over all aspects of aviation became absolute, with the exception of gliders and balloons over which Milch had control as deputy kommissar because Goring’s weight prevented him from flying in either.

The German Air Sports Association was dissolved in 1937 and replaced with the National Socialist Flyers Corps, a corporation under public law and subordinate to Reichsluftfahrtminister Göring.

== Rank designations of the DLV ==
DLV Airman Rank	Equivalent Luftwaffe Airman Rank
DLV-Fliegerchef: Air Marshal	Generalleutnant (Lieutenant General)
DLV-Fliegervizechef: Air Vice-Marshal	Generalmajor (Major General)
DLV-Fliegerkommodore: Air Commodore	Oberst (Colonel)
DLV-Fliegervizekommodore: Air Vice-Commodore	Oberstleutnant (Lieutenant Colonel)
DLV-Fliegerkommandant: Flight Commandant	Major (Major)
DLV-Fliegerkapitän: Flight Captain	Hauptmann (Captain)
DLV-Schwarmführer: Flight Commander	Oberleutnant (Senior Lieutenant)
DLV-Kettenführer: Flight Leader	Leutnant (Lieutenant)
DLV-Obermeister (Oberflugmeister, Oberfunkmeister, Oberortermeister, Oberwerkmeister): Senior Sergeant (or Senior Flight Sergeant, Sergeant Senior Radio Operator, Sergeant Senior Navigator/Observer, Sergeant Senior Engineer	Oberfeldwebel (Senior Non-Commissioned Officer)
DLV-Meister: Sergeant	Feldwebel (Non-Commissioned Officer)
DLV-Untermeister: Junior Sergeant	Unterfeldwebel (Junior Sergeant)
DLV-Flugzeugführer (Bordfunker, Oberwart): Aircraft Pilot (or Radio Operator, Supervisor)	Unteroffizier (Junior Non-Commissioned Officer)
DLV-Hilfsflugzeugführer (Hilfsbordfunker, Unterwart): Assistant Aircraft Pilot (or Assistant Radio Operator, Assistant Supervisor)	Gefreiter (Airman Lance Corporal)
DLV-Oberflieger: Senior Airman	No Equivalent
DLV-Flieger: Airman	Flieger (Airman)

== See also ==
- Aircrew Badge (Nazi)

== Bibliography ==
- Völker, Karl-Heinz (1967). Die Deutsche Luftwaffe 1933–1939. Aufbau, Führung und Rüstung der Luftwaffe sowie die Entwicklung der deutschen Luftkriegstheorie (Beiträge zur Militär- und Kriegsgeschichte) [The German Luftwaffe 1933–1939. Structure, Leadership and Armament of the Luftwaffe as well as the Development of German Air Warfare Theory (Contributions to Military and War History)] (in German). Vol. 8. Stuttgart: Militärgeschichtlichen Forschungsamt (Schriftenreihe des MGFA) / Military History Research Office (MGFA Series). pp. 20–21.
