= Wolf Hirth =

German gliding pioneer (1900–1959)

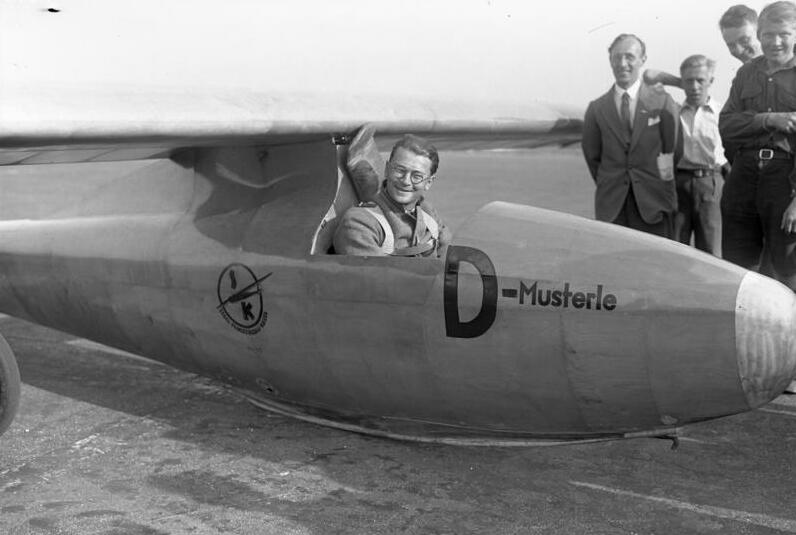
- Wolf Hirth waiting for a launch in the Laubenthal H2-PL Musterle glider, ca 1931
- Born: 28 February 1900; Stuttgart
- Died: 25 July 1959 (aged 59)
- Known for: Co-founder of Schempp-Hirth, glider manufacturers

Wolfram Kurt Erhard Hirth (28 February 1900 – 25 July 1959) was a German gliding pioneer and sailplane designer. He was a co-founder of Schempp-Hirth, still a renowned glider manufacturer.

Hirth was born in Stuttgart, the son of an engineer and tool-maker. He was the younger brother of Hellmuth, who founded the famous Hirth aircraft engine manufacturing company.

== Early years ==
As a young man, Hirth took up gliding and was soon drawn to the Wasserkuppe, then the focus of the German gliding movement, earning his pilot's licence in 1920. In 1924, Hirth lost a leg after a motorcycle accident. From then on, he would fly while wearing a wooden prosthesis. He had the fibula from his amputated leg fashioned into a cigarette holder

In 1928, he graduated from the Technical University of Stuttgart with a diploma in engineering and began to focus on aircraft construction. Over the next decade, he would also tour the world, promoting gliding throughout Europe, the United States, Japan, South America, and South Africa. On 10 March 1931 he gave a demonstration of glider aerobatics over New York City. On one of these publicity trips, he suffered major injuries in a crash in Hungary, requiring a hospital stay of four months. He and Robert Kronfeld were the first pilots to gain the Silver C badge. He was the chief flying instructor at the Grünau Gliding School in the Giant Mountains, then in Germany. In 1933, he became the Head of the new Gliding School in Hornberg.

Later in the year, he became the first to correctly identify the phenomenon of wave lift, the highest form of lift source available to soaring pilots.

In Jan. 1934, he joined Professor Georgii's South America expedition, along with Peter Riedel, Hanna Reitsch, and Heini Dittmar, to study thermal conditions, with his sailplane "Moatzagotl". While in Argentina, Wolf set a record of seventy-six successive loops.

Wolf Hirth also took part in International Championships of Touring Aircraft Challenge 1929, Challenge 1932 (6th place) and Challenge 1934 (13th place). After some time in the USA he returned to Germany in 1934 because of US economic depression.

== Glider company ==
With the assistance of Wolf Hirth, Martin Schempp founded his own company in Göppingen in 1935: "Sportflugzeugbau Göppingen Martin Schempp". In 1938, Wolf Hirth, mainly responsible for the design work, officially became a partner in the company, which then took on the new name "Sportflugzeugbau Schempp-Hirth". The company relocated to Kirchheim-Teck the same year. The company first manufactured a small training glider, the Göppingen Gö 1, intended to rival the Grunau Baby. The company's first real success, however, was the Gö 3 Minimoa, a distinctive aircraft with an elegant gull wing design that was used to break several world records and win championships around the world.

Hirth continued to direct the firm throughout World War II. In 1940 the company began manufacturing assembly parts for Messerschmitt Me 323 and Messerschmitt Bf 109 and other aircraft. From 1945 the company made furniture and other wooden components for industry until glider production could begin again in 1951. He was elected President of the German Aero-Club in 1956.

== Death ==
Hirth had a heart attack while flying his Vogt Lo-100 aerobatic glider in 1959 and died in the subsequent crash. Handbuch des Segelfliegens was published posthumously in 1963.

== Honours ==
In many municipalities of Baden-Württemberg roads were named after Wolf Hirth. In Bartholomä, Bettringen, Böblingen, Ditzingen, Esslingen-am-Neckar, Leinzell, Leonberg, Kirchheim/Teck and Schramberg there is a Wolf-Hirth-Straße. Outside of Baden-Württemberg, there is a Wolf-Hirth-Straße in Gersfeld (Rhön), and a Hirthstraße in Kiel-Holtenau.

== Literature ==
- Jörg Baldenhofer (Hrsg.): Schwäbische Tüftler und Erfinder. DRW-Verlag, Stuttgart 1986, ISBN 3-87181-232-3.
- Gert Behrsing (1972). "Hirth, Wolf". Neue Deutsche Biographie (in German). Vol. 9. Berlin: Duncker & Humblot. pp. 237–238. (full text online).
- Stefan Blumenthal: Grüße aus der Luft. 100 Jahre Luftfahrt auf alten Postkarten. Motorbuch-Verlag, Stuttgart 1991, ISBN 3-613-01336-3.
- Stefan Blumenthal: Albert Hirth und seine Söhne Hellmuth und Wolf: eine schwäbische Erfinderfamilie. In: Jörg Baldenhofer (Hrsg.): Schwäbische Tüftler und Erfinder. DRW-Verlag, Stuttgart 1986, ISBN 3-87181-232-3, S. 112-121.
- Lisa Heiss: Erfinder, Rennfahrer, Flieger. Hirth. Vater. Hellmuth Wolf. Verlag Reinhold A. Müller, Stuttgart 1949.

== See also ==
- Hanna Reitsch
