= Göppingen Gö 1 =

German single-seat glider, 1935

Gö 1 Wolf
- A Gö 1 in the background regn no. PH 68

General information
- Type: Sailplane
- National origin: Germany
- Manufacturer: Sportflugzeugbau Schempp-Hirth
- Number built: at least 6

History
- First flight: 1935

The Göppingen Gö 1 Wolf was a single-seat glider produced in Germany from 1935.

== Design and development ==
Conceived as a rival to the Grunau Baby, it was the first product of the newly formed Sportflugzeugbau Göppingen Martin Schempp firm. It was a conventional, strut-braced high-wing design of wooden construction, incorporating a wheel aft of the loaded centre of gravity to ease ground handling, as well as aero-tow and winch launches.

Of very similar construction to the Grunau Baby, the Wolf had strut-braced high-set monoplane wings supported on a pylon aft of the cockpit. The hexagonal-section fuselage was constructed largely of wood with plywood skinning and the wings and tail surfaces were plywood-skinned back to the main spars with wooden-framed fabric-covered rear portions. The undercarriage consisted of rubber-sprung skids under the nose and tail with a fixed mainwheel aft of the loaded centre of gravity.

== Operational history ==
Stressed for aerobatics, one example was purchased by Alan Cobham's National Aviation Day displays, and was flown under tow directly to London by Joan Meakin. During early flying with the Wolf it gained a reputation for dangerous spinning characteristics, which resulted in the Gö 1 being grounded in 1938, pending incorporation of modified, longer-chord, slotted ailerons.

The cost of the required modifications proved uneconomic for the majority of owners and the majority of Gö 1s never flew again and only three are known to have survived in museums. One is still operational in Germany at Schempp-Hirth GmbH. On June 30, 2018, Tilo Holighaus made a 74 km cross country flight with it.

== Variants ==
TG-20
Four Gö 1s impressed by the USAAF and allocated serials 42-57168,42-57175, 42-57195, and 42-57204

== Specifications (Gö 1 Wolf) ==
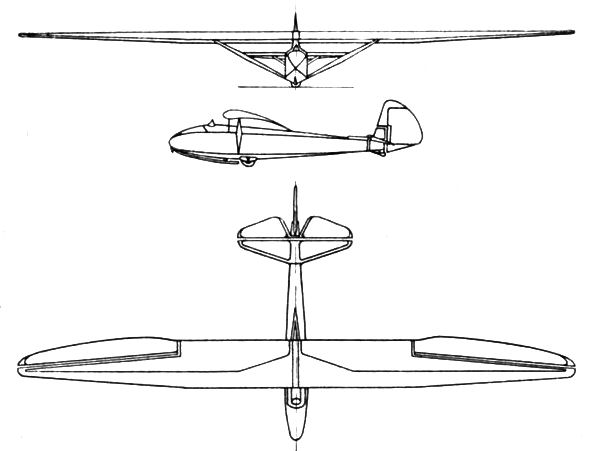
Göppingen Gö 1 Wolf 3-view drawing from L'Aerophile March 1937

Data from Sailplanes 1920–1945.

General characteristics

- Crew: 1
- Length: 6.3 m (20 ft 8 in)
- Wingspan: 14 m (45 ft 11 in)
- Wing area: 15 m^{2} (160 sq ft)
- Aspect ratio: 13
- Airfoil: Göttingen 535
- Empty weight: 145 kg (320 lb)
- Gross weight: 220 kg (485 lb)

Performance

- Rate of sink: 0.96 m/s (189 ft/min)
- Lift-to-drag: 17 at 72 km/h (45 mph)
- Wing loading: 14.66 kg/m^{2} (3.00 lb/sq ft)

== See also ==
Aircraft of comparable role, configuration, and era

- Schneider Grunau Baby

Related lists

- List of gliders
