= Schneider ES-57 Kingfisher =

Low-cost, short-span Australian glider

ES-57 Kingfisher
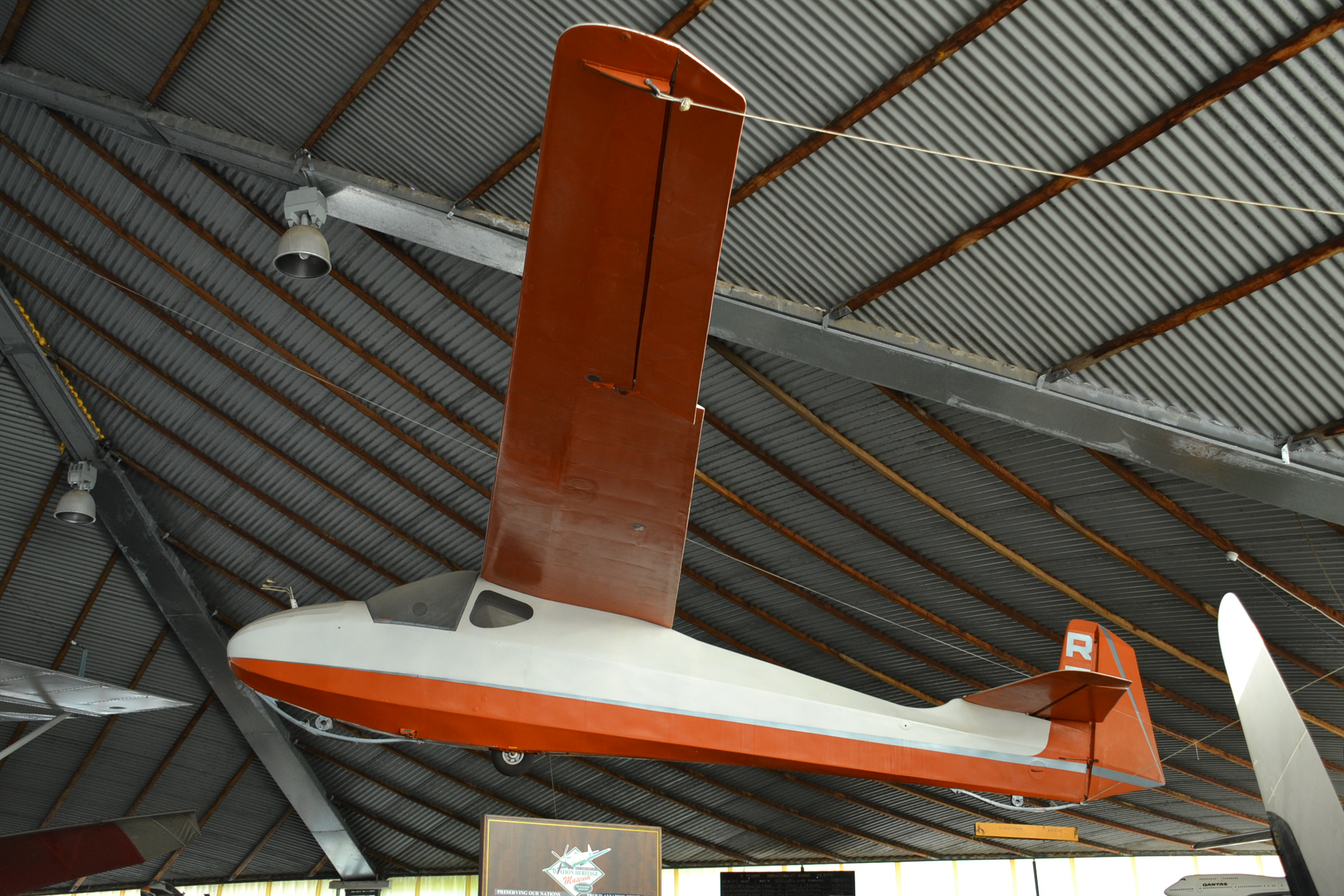
- Schneider Kingfisher on display at the Aviation Heritage Museum (Western Australia)

General information
- Type: Club and personal glider
- National origin: Australia
- Manufacturer: Edmund Schneider Australia
- Designer: Edmund Schneider
- Number built: 11

History
- Manufactured: 2 years by the factory
- First flight: 1956

The Schneider ES-57 Kingfisher is a low-cost, short-span Australian glider capable of respectable cross country soaring flights. It was produced in small numbers in the late 1950s.

== Design and development ==
The Kingfisher, with its 10.5 m (34 ft 5 in) span and simple construction, was designed to fill the need of Australian glider pilots for a small, low-cost aircraft capable of soaring and cross-country flying. It was designed by Edmund Schneider and built in his Australian factory, though a few were constructed by amateurs. Schneider had emigrated from Germany in 1950.

The Kingfisher is wooden-framed and covered with a mixture of plywood and fabric. Its high wing is built around a single spar and is double-straight tapered in plan with zero sweep at the quarter chord line. There is 3° of dihedral. Ahead of the spar the wings are ply-covered, and the roots are reinforced with wider, rectangular plan, ply skin as are the blunt wing tips. The remaining 68% of the wing is fabric covered, including most of the aileron surfaces. Gapless upper surface spoilers are mounted at 44% chord and at about one third span.

The fuselage is of frame and stringer construction and wholly ply-covered apart from the small, fabric-covered, double-curved region between cockpit and nose. It has a hexagonal section, with deep sides which slope inwards towards the fuselage bottom. The cockpit stretches aft to the leading edge, covered by a blown, side-opening perspex canopy. There are small side windows under the wing. The fuselage tapers aft to the tail, where a narrow, ply-skinned fin carries an angular, fabric-covered rudder which extends down to the keel. Originally the horizontal tail was mostly fabric-covered and mounted on top of the fuselage ahead of the rudder, but early flight tests led to it being raised out of the wing's wake on a short pillar. Its rigidity was increased with ply covering on the tailplane, its tips extended rearwards to contain shortened elevators. The Kingfisher had a short protective skid under the nose but landed on a single, unsprung, semi-recessed wheel aided by a rubber-sprung tail skid.

== Operational history ==
Its first flight was in 1956. A flight of 217 km (135 mi) flown by Harry Schneider, Edmund Schneider's eldest son, brought it attention; he later extended this to 300 km (186 mi). The aircraft was well received; eight examples were built in the factory and three more were produced by amateur constructors. They competed well against sailplanes of greater span and cost. One amateur builder finished his Kingfisher in 1964 and gained attention with his bungee cord self-launches, soaring in the mountains of the Great Dividing Range.

Another amateur builder lowered the wing to a little above the mid wing position, at the same time replacing the cockpit side windows with a glazing extension rearwards above the wing.

Two Kingfishers survive but only one is on public display, the other being under restoration in 2008.

== Aircraft on display ==
- Aviation Heritage Museum (Western Australia), Perth: VH-GRE, cn 42.

== Specifications ==
Data from The World's Sailplanes (1963) pp.26-7

General characteristics

- Crew: One
- Length: 5.75 m (18 ft 10 in)
- Wingspan: 10.50 m (34 ft 5 in)
- Height: 1.1 m (3 ft 7 in) over cockpit
- Wing area: 9.4 m^{2} (101 sq ft)
- Aspect ratio: 11.75
- Airfoil: Göttingen 549, tip M 12
- Empty weight: 109 kg (240 lb) equipped
- Gross weight: 195 kg (430 lb)
- Wing loading: 20.7 kg/m^{2} (4.24 lb/sqft)

Performance

- Maximum speed: 200 km/h (120 mph, 110 kn) smooth air, placard
- Maximum speed, rough air: 144 km/h (89 mph; 78 kn)
- Stall speed: 54 km/h (34 mph, 29 kn)
- Rate of sink: 0.99 m/s (195 ft/min) minimum, at 67 km/h (42 mph; 36 kn)
- Lift-to-drag: maximum 21 at 83 km/h (52 mph; 45 kn)
- Winch launch speed: 104 km/h (65 mph; 56 kn)
- Aero-tow speed: 113 km/h (70 mph; 61 kn)

== See also ==
Related lists

- List of gliders
