= Edmund Schneider =

Glider designer and manufacturer (1901–1968)

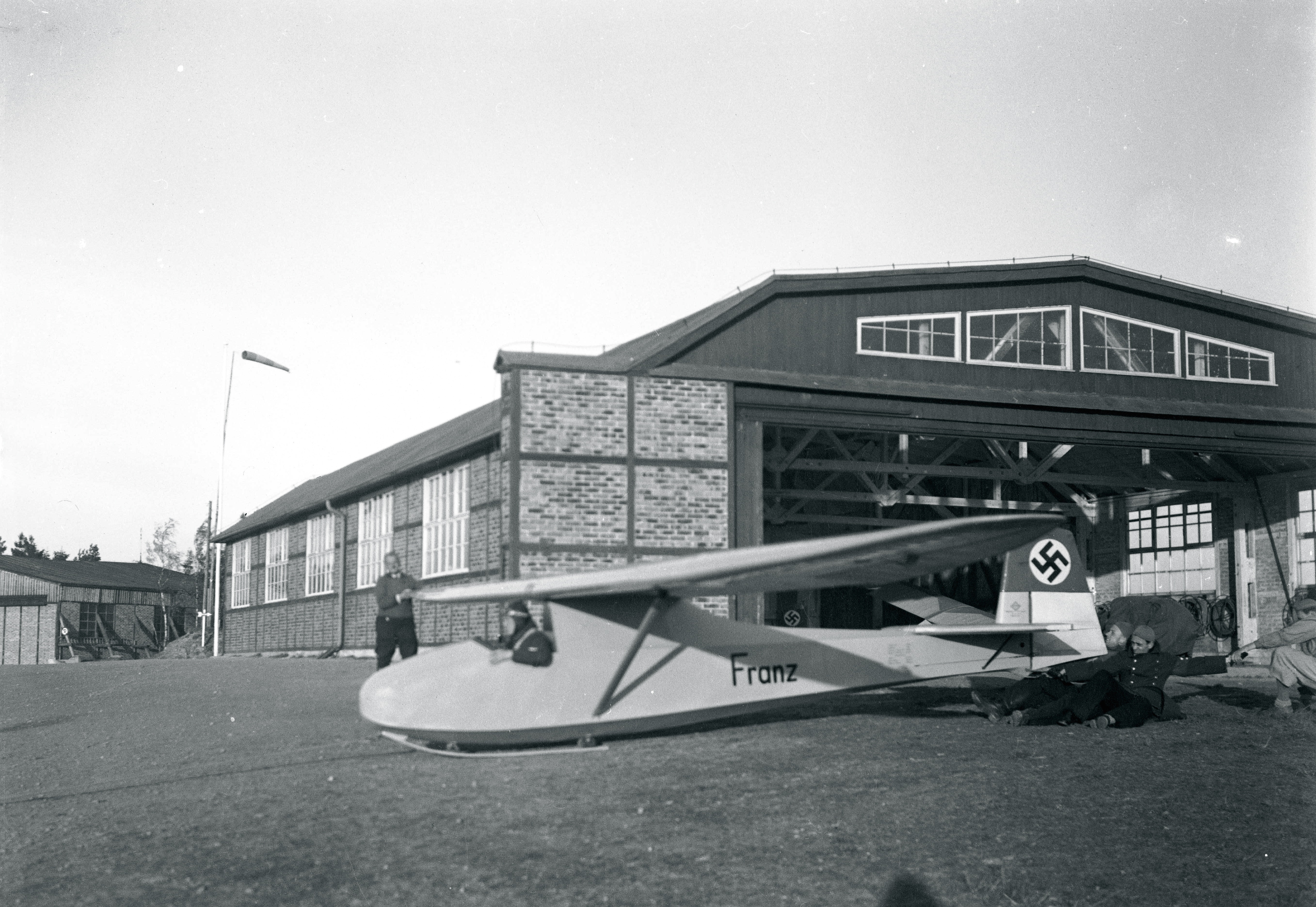
Grunau Baby glider in front of the workshop in Grunau, near Hirschberg, Lower Silesia

Edmund Schneider (26 July 1901 - 5 July 1968) was a German aircraft designer and founder of a glider construction company. He played a significant role in the development of early training and competition gliders, including the widely used Schneider Grunau Baby. His contributions to glider design continued after World War II, leading him to establish operations in Australia, where he further influenced the sport of gliding.

== Career ==
=== Early life ===
Schnieder was born in Ravensburg on 26 July 1901 and completed a carpentry apprenticeship in Memmingen. Toward the end of the First World War, he applied to join the German Air Combat Forces (Deutsche Luftstreitkräfte) but was deemed unfit to fly. Instead, he found work as a carpenter at the Schleissheim Aircraft Workshop (Flugwerft Schleissheim), where military aircraft were repaired. This position allowed him to study the design of fighter aircraft from manufacturers such as Pfalz, Albatros Flugzeugwerke, LFG, Fokker, and Junkers.

=== Hesse ===
At the end of the war, Schneider moved to the Wasserkuppe mountain range gliding site in the state of Hesse in the spring of 1923. There, he met Gottlob Espenlaub and assisted in completing gliders designed by Alexander Lippisch for the Rhön competition that summer.

=== Grunau ===
In the autumn 1923, Schneider accompanied Espenlaub to Grunau near Hirschberg, Lower Silesia, which was then part of Weimar Germany (now in Poland), at the invitation of a local group from the German Flying Club. Over the winter, they developed a stable training glider designed for simplicity of construction and operation. After several modifications, this design led to the creation of the Espenlaub-Schneider ESG-9, a basic training glider. While Espenlaub later relocated to Kassel, Schneider remained in Grunau, where he established his own glider construction company, Segelflugzeugbau Edmund Schneider (Edmund Schneider Glider Construction), in 1928. His most notable design was the Schneider Grunau Baby, which became widely produced. By approximately 1931, around 3,000 units had been manufactured at his Grunau facility.

In addition to the company's own aircraft, commissioned designs were also produced, including the Wiesenbaude 1 and Wiesenbaude 2 gliders for Eugen Bönsch, as well as the fuselage of Wolf Hirth's glider, Moazagotl. Hirth served as the principal of the Grunau gliding school in 1931–1932.

=== World War II ===
As demand from the National Socialist Flyers Corps grew, Schneider employed over 350 workers across two plants when war broke out in 1939. At the end of World War II, he abandoned his business in Grunau and fled with his family to Mühlhofen on Lake Constance.

=== Australia ===
The ES-49 "Wallaby" design was drafted, with a copy preserved at the Wasserkuppe. In 1951, the Schneider family emigrated to Australia at the invitation of the Adelaide Aero Club, where Schneider established Edmund Schneider Pty Ltd. Other notable gliders, such as the Schneider ES-52 Kookaburra and the Schneider ES-60 Boomerang, were built in Australia at his new factory in Adelaide. Additionally, a licensed version of the Schleicher Ka 6 was produced in Australia.

== Death ==
Schneider died on 5 July 1968 in Rottach-Egern, West Germany, at the age of 67.
