= Schneider Grunau Baby =

German single-seat glider, 1931

Grunau Baby
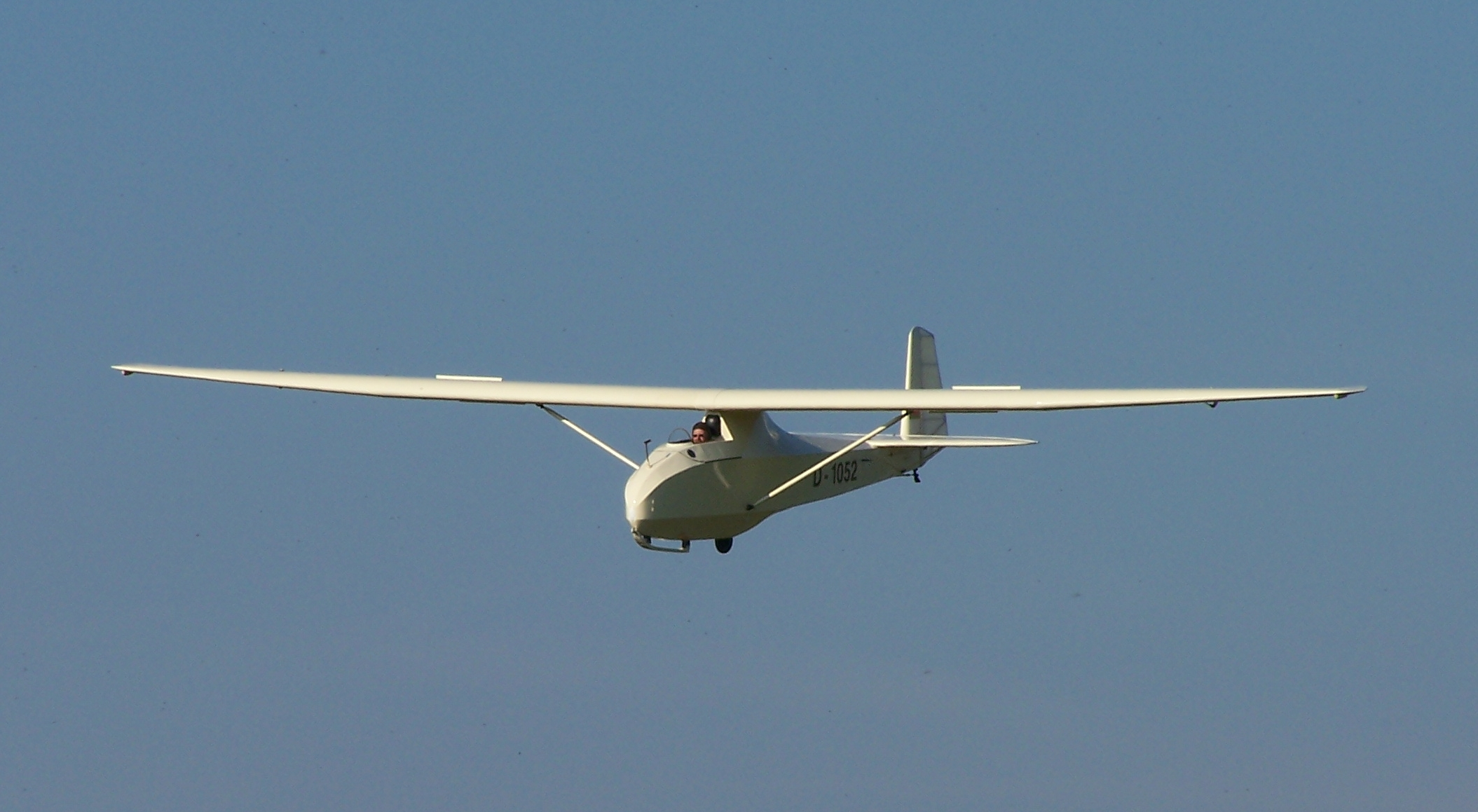
- Grunau Baby III

General information
- Type: Sailplane
- Manufacturer: Schneider, Slingsby, Elliotts of Newbury, Nord, NV Vliegtuigbouw, Laminação Nacional de Metais, (later Companhia Aeronáutica Paulista, Brazil)
- Designer: Edmund Schneider
- Number built: ca. 6000

History
- Introduction date: 1931

The Schneider Grunau Baby is a single-seat sailplane first built in Germany in 1931, with some 6,000 examples constructed in some 20 countries. It was relatively easy to build from plans, it flew well, and the aircraft was strong enough to handle mild aerobatics and the occasional hard landing. When the Baby first appeared, it was accepted wisdom that the pilot should feel as much unimpeded airflow as possible, to better sense rising and falling currents of air, temperature changes, etc.

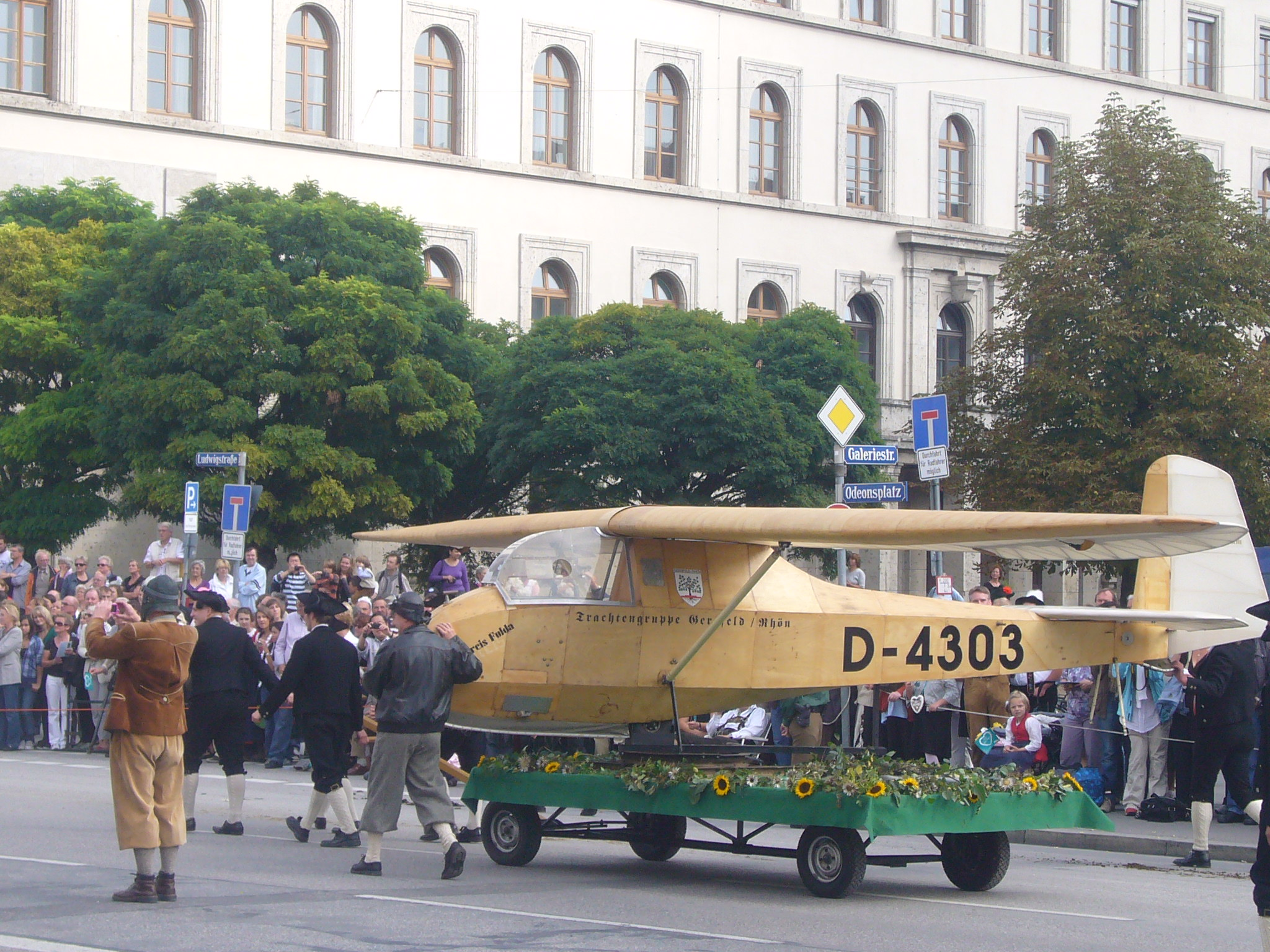
Grunau Baby III from the Wasserkuppe Museum at the 2009 Munich Oktoberfest

It was designed by Edmund Schneider with the assistance of Wolf Hirth and Hugo Kromer as a smaller version of Schneider's ESG 31 of the previous year, incorporating an elliptical wing design based on work done by Akaflieg Darmstadt. It was named after Grunau, the town where Schneider's factory was located, now Jeżów Sudecki in Poland. The first 14 inner ribs were of the Göttingen 535 shape with the outer ribs gradually changing up to the last 22nd rib, having a bi-convex and symmetrical shape with a slight reduction in the angle of incidence. The tips and leading edges of the wings up to the main spar were covered with plywood. The tail unit was built of plywood. The intention was to create an aircraft suitable both for training and for cross-country soaring. Typical for its day, it was a high-wing braced monoplane with a fuselage of hexagonal cross-section and an open cockpit. The Baby was an instant success, and was enthusiastically promoted by gliding champion Wolf Hirth. An extensive redesign was undertaken in 1932 following the fatal crash of an unrelated Schneider design, which resulted in the Baby II. This version and the definitive Baby IIb that followed were adopted as standard sailplane trainers for the German Air Sports Association (later the National Socialist Flyers Corps).

During 1941, 30 GB gliders were built by Laminação Nacional de Metais, later Companhia Aeronáutica Paulista in Brazil, under the name "Alcatraz". Following World War II, series production restarted in Germany in 1956. The Baby was also built in France (as the Nord 1300) and the United Kingdom (as the Elliotts Baby EoN and the Slingsby T5 - Slingsby also used it as the basis for a number of their own designs). Edmund Schneider emigrated to Australia, where he developed the Baby design into his Baby 3 and Baby 4, which had enclosed cockpits.

== Variants ==
ESG 31
The precursor to the Baby with larger less sophisticated wings
Baby
The initial version - an ESG31 with an improved wing based on work done by Akaflieg Darmstadt
Baby II
Baby IIa
Baby IIb
Baby III
Alcatraz
Thirty aircraft licence-built in Brazil by Laminação Nacional de Metais, later called CAP Companhia Aeronáutica Paulista
Nord 1300

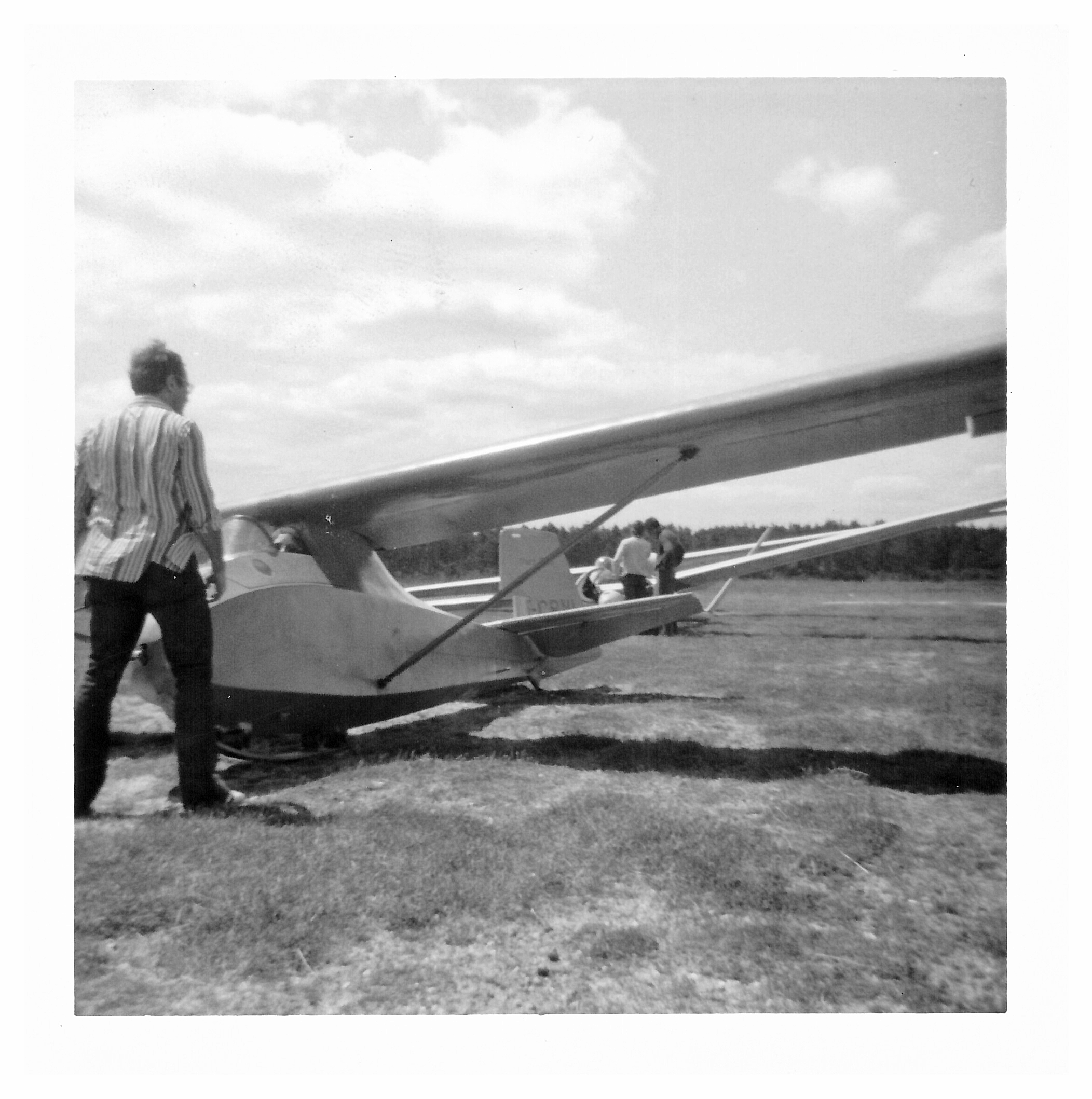
A French Nord 1300 circa 1970

License production in France by Nord Aviation
Elliotts Baby EoN
License production in England by Elliotts of Newbury One is now at the Gliding Heritage Centre
Slingsby T5
License production in England by Slingsby Sailplanes
Baby 3
Postwar redesign, with an enclosed cockpit, by Edmund Schneider after he emigrated to Australia
Baby 4
Further improvements made for production in Australia
Baby V
A two-seat version using Baby III wings with a new tandem seat fabric covered steel tube fuselage
AB Flygplan Se-102
License production in Sweden for the Royal Swedish Air Force
Hawkridge Grunau Baby
licence-built Grunau Babys
TG-27 Grunau Baby
Grunau Babys impressed into the USAAF in 1942
IFIL-Reghin RG-1
Grunau Babys built in Romania under licence
Stiglmeier S.24
Variant by Herman J. Stiglmeier with the wings of a Bowlus BA-100 Baby Albatross. One (registered NX15539) was impressed into USAAF service in 1942 as the TG-14 (s/n 42-57183).
Motor-Baby
A motor-glider conversion, (D-YBIF), powered by a Kroeber M4 2-stroke engine driving a pusher propeller behind the centre-section. The rear fuselage upper decking was removed to accommodate the propeller and reduce drag from prop-wash.

== Specifications (Baby IIb) ==

Data from The World's Sailplanes:Die Segelflugzeuge der Welt:Les Planeurs du Monde

General characteristics

- Crew: one
- Length: 6.09 m (20 ft 0 in)
- Wingspan: 13.57 m (44 ft 6 in)
- Wing area: 14.2 m^{2} (153 sq ft)
- Aspect ratio: 13
- Airfoil: Göttingen 535
- Empty weight: 170 kg (375 lb) (equipped)
- Max takeoff weight: 250 kg (551 lb)

Performance

- Never exceed speed: 150 km/h (93 mph, 81 kn)
- Aerotow speed: 90 km/h (56 mph; 49 kn)
- Winch launch speed: 80 km/h (50 mph; 43 kn)
- Maximum glide ratio: 17 at 60 km/h (37 mph; 32 kn)
- Rate of sink: 0.85 m/s (167 ft/min) at 55 km/h (34 mph; 30 kn)
- Wing loading: 17.68 kg/m^{2} (3.62 lb/sq ft)

== See also ==
Aircraft of comparable role, configuration, and era

- Hütter Hü 17

Related lists

- List of gliders
- List of most-produced aircraft
