= Jeżów Sudecki =

- Village
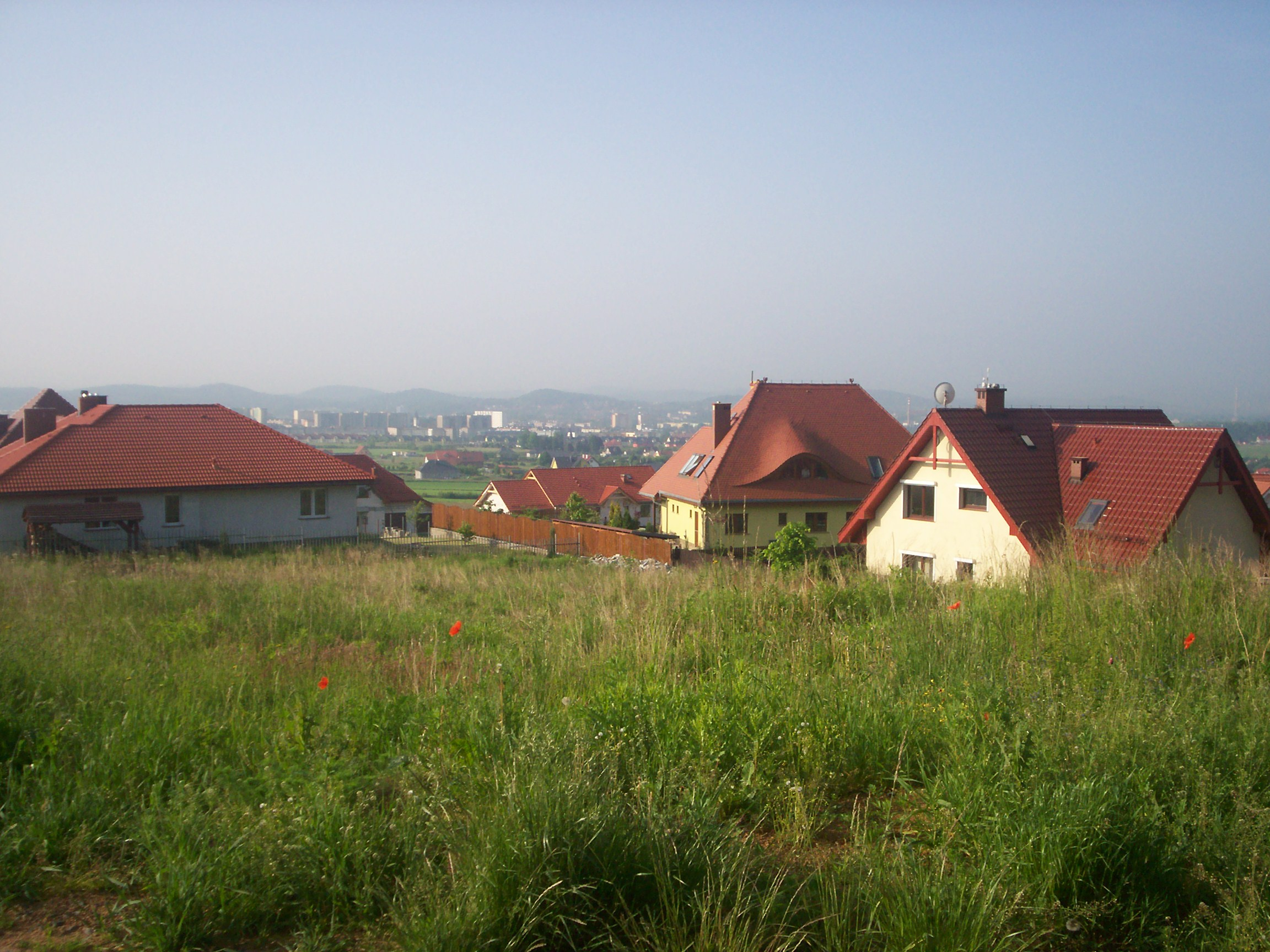

- Location within Poland
- Coordinates: 50°55′57″N 15°44′36″E
- Country: Poland
- Voivodeship: Lower Silesian
- County: Karkonosze
- Gmina: Jeżów Sudecki
- First mentioned: 1299

Population
  - Total: 2,613 (2,011)
- Time zone: UTC+1 (CET)
  - Summer (DST): UTC+2 (CEST)
- Vehicle registration: DJE

Jeżów Sudecki is a village in Karkonosze County, located in the Lower Silesian Voivodeship of southwestern Poland. It serves as the administrative seat of Gmina Jeżów Sudecki.

Situated approximately 4 km (2 mi) north of Jelenia Góra and 94 km (58 mi) west of the regional capital Wrocław, the village holds historical significance and is known for its connections to gliding aviation.

== History ==
Gronow was first documented in 1299. Over the centuries, its name evolved through various forms, including Grunow (1303), Grunowe (1321), Grunaw (1651), Grunau (1765), Alt-, Neu-Grunau (1786), Grunau bei Hirschberg (1908), Grunów, Gronów, Gronowice (1945), and Jeżów Sudecki (from 1946). Initially part of the Duchy of Legnica, it later became part of the Duchy of Świdnica-Jawor following territorial divisions within fragmented Piast-ruled Poland. After the death of Duke Bolko II in 1368, the region formally passed to the Crown of Bohemia, though Bolko II's widow, Agnes of Habsburg, retained usufruct rights until she died in 1392.

In 1506, the town was acquired by the Hirschberg (Jelenia Góra) city council. The discovery of gold and silver ores led to mining operations leased to miners from the Electorate of Saxony, for whom residential houses were constructed. However, following the Thirty Years' War, mining ceased, giving way to craftsmanship, arts, weaving, and agriculture.

After the First Silesian War, the town, along with most of Silesia, was annexed by Prussia in 1742. By 1765, the spelling of the town's name was formally recorded as Grunau. Following Prussia's administrative reorganization, Grunau became part of Hirschberg County in 1816. In the 20th century, Grunau gained renown for the gliding school founded in 1921, which later inspired the name of the famous glider, the "Grunau Baby."

During World War II, Nazi Germany operated a forced labour camp for French prisoners of war in the village.

Following Germany's defeat in the war the village became again part of Poland. Initially renamed to Gronów, then Jeżów, it was officially renamed Jeżów Sudecki in 1947 by adding the adjective Sudecki after the Sudetes to distinguish it from other settlements of the same name. Most of the German population was expelled in 1945/46 unless they had fled earlier. Many of the new settlers arrived from eastern Poland, which had been annexed by the Soviet Union. Today, the village's economy is primarily driven by tourism.

== Transport ==
There is a railway station in Jeżów Sudecki.

== See also ==
- Grunau Baby
- Karkonosze National Park
