= Gull wing =

Aircraft wing configuration with bend at root

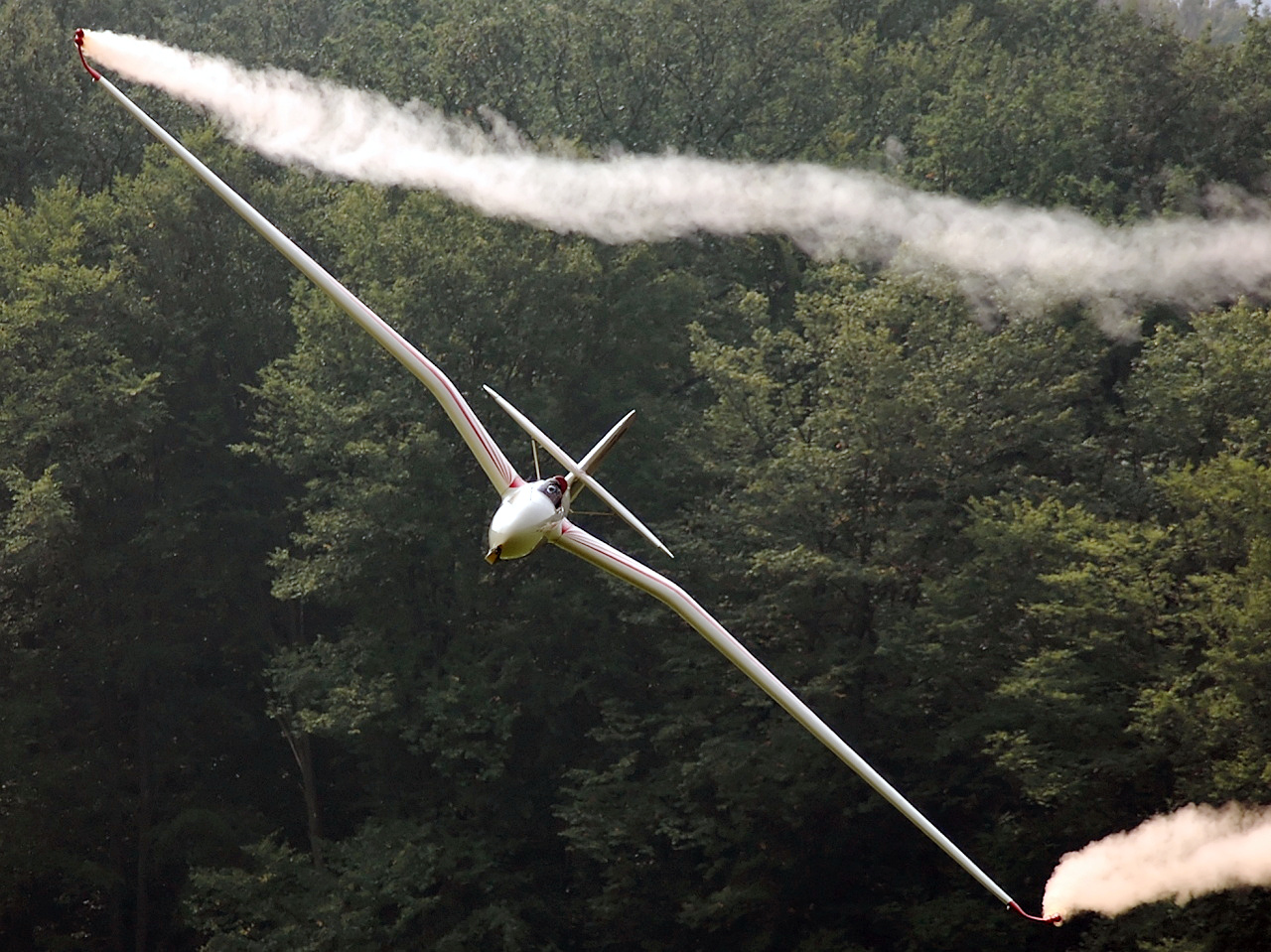
DFS Habicht glider showing gull wing profile.

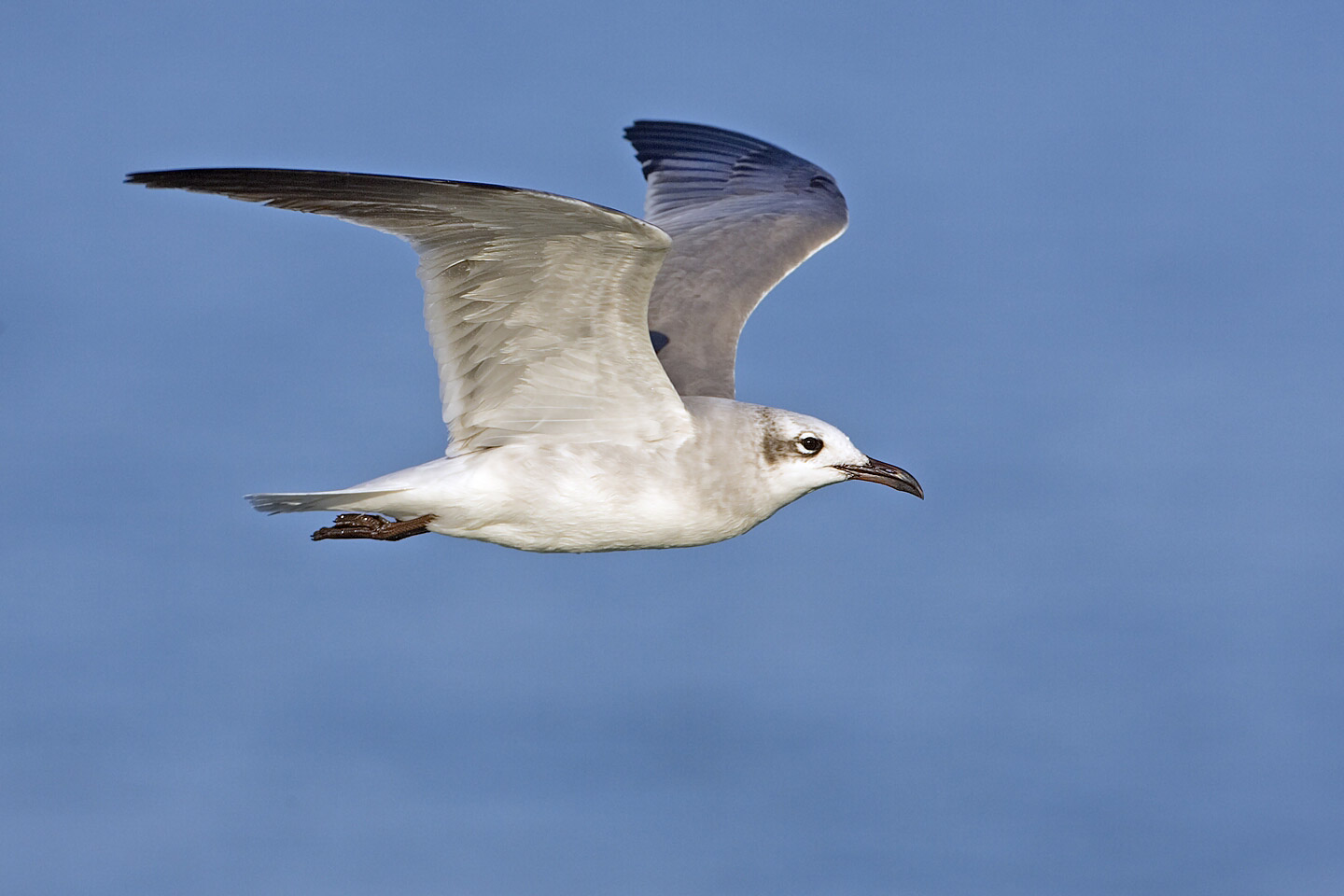
Laughing gull showing the wing shape emulated in gull wing aircraft.

The gull wing, also known as Polish wing or Puławski wing, is an aircraft wing configuration with a prominent bend in the wing inner section towards the wing root. Its name is derived from the seabirds which it resembles and from the Polish aircraft designer Zygmunt Puławski who started using this design in his planes. Numerous aircraft have incorporated such wings for a diverse range of purposes. The gull wing was commonly used to improve visibility in a high wing arrangement, because such wing could be thinnest by the fuselage, and in theory should limit pilot's view no more than A-pillars of a windscreen in a car body.

Gliders were the first aircraft to feature the gull wing, starting with the Weltensegler in 1921; it was not until the record-breaking Fafnir at the end of that decade did the configuration gain popularity. Beyond becoming popular for the next three decades amongst high-performance gliders, various ground-based aircraft and flying boats also adopted various forms of gull wings. It rose to particular prominence in Poland, where the Polish aviation designer Zygmunt Puławski developed a range of fighter aircraft during the late 1920s and early 1930s; in particular, the PZL P.11, which possessed various cutting-edge features for the era in addition to its high-mounted gull wing, has been described as being the most advanced fighter aircraft of its kind in the world upon its introduction. The PZL P.11 served as Poland's primary fighter aircraft during the mid to late 1930s, while its further development, the PZL P.24, served in the air forces of several countries and was a major success of the Polish aircraft industry.

Various flying boats, such as the Short Knuckleduster, Dornier Do 26, and PBM Mariner, also adopted the gull wing configuration, primarily as it enabled the engines to be positioned higher above the water. A variant of the standard configuration, the "inverted gull wing", has been used on numerous fighters to facilitate the use of shorter landing gear and to provide sufficient ground clearance for their propellers.

== Sailplanes ==
The gull wing was first implemented on a glider, specifically the Weltensegler, which performed its maiden flight in 1921. Its wings, which were externally braced, featured swept-back wingtips with negative incidence relative to the remainder of the main-plane. The Weltensegler also used a unique control system, consisting of a various pulleys and springs connected to a single control stick for the pilot, which warped the wing-tips as directed by the pilot. This unorthodox method relied upon the incidence changing with the increase and release of tension, and was also expected to confer increased stability in pitch and roll by automatic changes in wing-tip incidence; however, it gave no direct control over the wing-tips. The flying career of the Weltensegler was very brief, it being destroyed during the 1921 Rhön gliding competition after the wing failed during a sharp spiralling dive at excessive speed, resulting in the death of Willy Leusch, the Weltensegler's company test pilot.

Following the Weltensegler's tragic loss, the gull wing was avoided by the majority of aircraft designers for almost a whole decade. During 1930, Alexander Lippisch's record-breaking Fafnir represented a high-profile comeback for the gull wing, which contributed to its resurgence shortly thereafter. Fafnir featured a laterally stabilising dihedral, an uncommon feature for gliders of the era, which spanned roughly 40 percent of the inner wing span. Lippisch had chosen to adopt this configuration for its increased wingtip clearance, as well as the ill-founded belief that it would improve its stability during turns; however, studies have shown that normal gull wing configurations result in significantly less severe and more easily recoverable stalls. Inverted gull wings exhibit the opposite stall behaviour, but both normal and inverted gull wings impede lift-to-drag ratio and climb performance.

The performance demonstrated by Fafnir, such as a 220 km (140 mi) flight between the Wasserkuppe and Magdeburg in late August 1930 that established a new world record, quickly encouraged numerous aircraft designers to perform their own investigations into the gull wing. Accordingly, numerous other gliders, as well as other platforms, would soon feature broadly similar wing configurations as well. Having become a trend of the glider industry during the 1930s, the gull wing remained a staple feature amongst high-performance sailplanes through to the 1950s.

Notable gull wing sailplanes

- Bowlus Senior Albatross
- DFS Habicht
- DFS Kranich
- DFS Reiher
- Göppingen Gö 3 Minimoa
- Lawrence Tech IV "Yankee Doodle"
- Lippisch Fafnir
- Ross RS-1 Zanonia
- Schweyer Rhönsperber
- Slingsby Kite
- Weltensegler
- Ikarus Košava

== Seaplanes ==
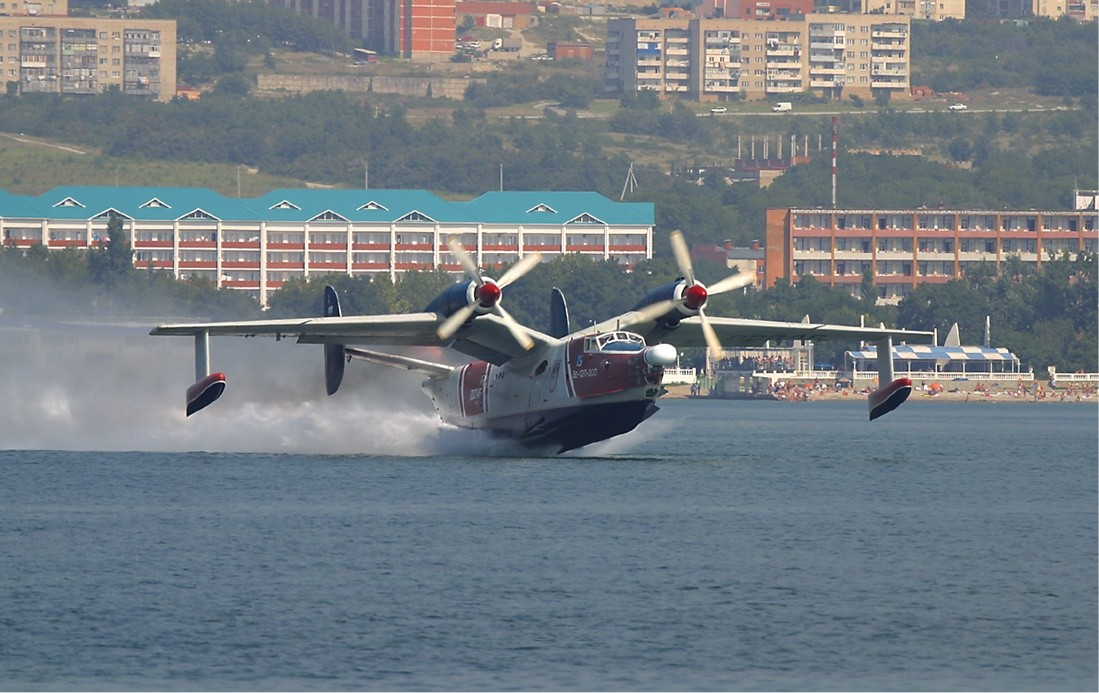
Beriev Be-12 seaplane with gull wing profile

The gull wing design found its way into seaplanes by the early 1930s. As engine power increased, so did the need for large propellers that could effectively convert power to thrust. The gull wing allowed designers to ensure adequate propeller tip clearance over the water by placing the engines on the highest point of the wing. The alternative was placing the engine on a pylon. The first flying boat to utilize the gull wing configuration may have been the Short Knuckleduster, which first flew in 1933. The Dornier Do 26, a high-speed airliner and transport platform, of which six aircraft were built, made its first flight during 1938. The configuration was also used on the US Navy's PBM Mariner and P5M Marlin maritime patrol aircraft. The emergence of long range, land-based jets in the 1950s and the subsequent demise of the seaplane prevented widespread use of the gull wing, although it was still used in some post-war designs, like Beriev Be-12 Chaika (the name means 'gull' in Russian).

Examples:

- Beriev Be-6
- Dornier Do 26
- Martin P5M Marlin
- Piaggio P.136
- Short Knuckleduster

== Landplanes ==
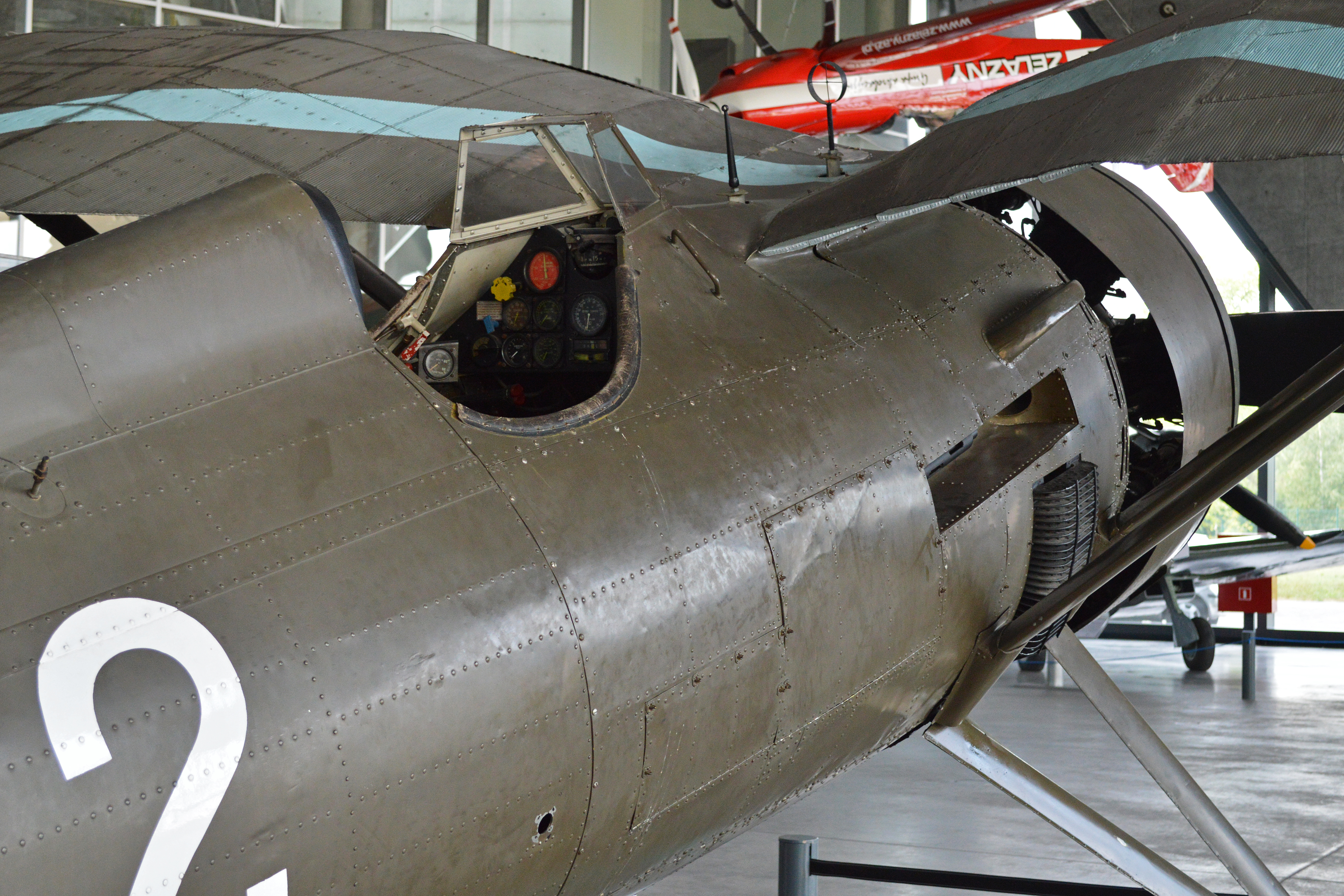
PZL P.11c, showing an idea of original Puławski's wing

During the late 1920s, the gull wing design found its way into landplanes. In 1928, the Polish aircraft designer Zygmunt Puławski developed the PZL P.1, an experimental fighter aircraft; a major innovation of the PZL P.1 was its relatively high-mounted gull wing. Seeking to protect his new wing arrangement, Puławski filed for an associated patent for this wing arrangement during the following year. The arrangement devised by Puławski has been referred to as the "Puławski Wing" or the "Polish Wing". The PZL P.1 led to a production model, the PZL P.7, of which 149 were produced between 1932 and 1933.

The gull wing was used to improve visibility in a high wing arrangement, because such wing could be thinnest by the fuselage, and in theory should limit pilot's view no more than A-pillars of a windscreen in a car body. It was used on multiple fighter aircraft, including the PZL P.11 and Soviet Polikarpov I-15. The PZL P.11 was a further improvement of the PZL P.7 that was in production throughout the early 1930s. It possessed various cutting-edge features for the era in addition to the high-mounted gull wing, such as its all-metal structure and its metal exterior; according to aviation author Jerzy Cynk, the P.11 was commonly considered to have been the most advanced fighter aircraft of its kind in the world upon its introduction. The P.11 served as Poland's primary fighter aircraft during the mid to late 1930s, participating in the Polish campaign of 1939 to resist an invasion by neighbouring Nazi Germany. As a consequence of the rapid aeronautical advances made during the late 1930s, the P.11 was outclassed by newer fighters such as the Messerschmitt Bf 109 at the onset of the conflict.

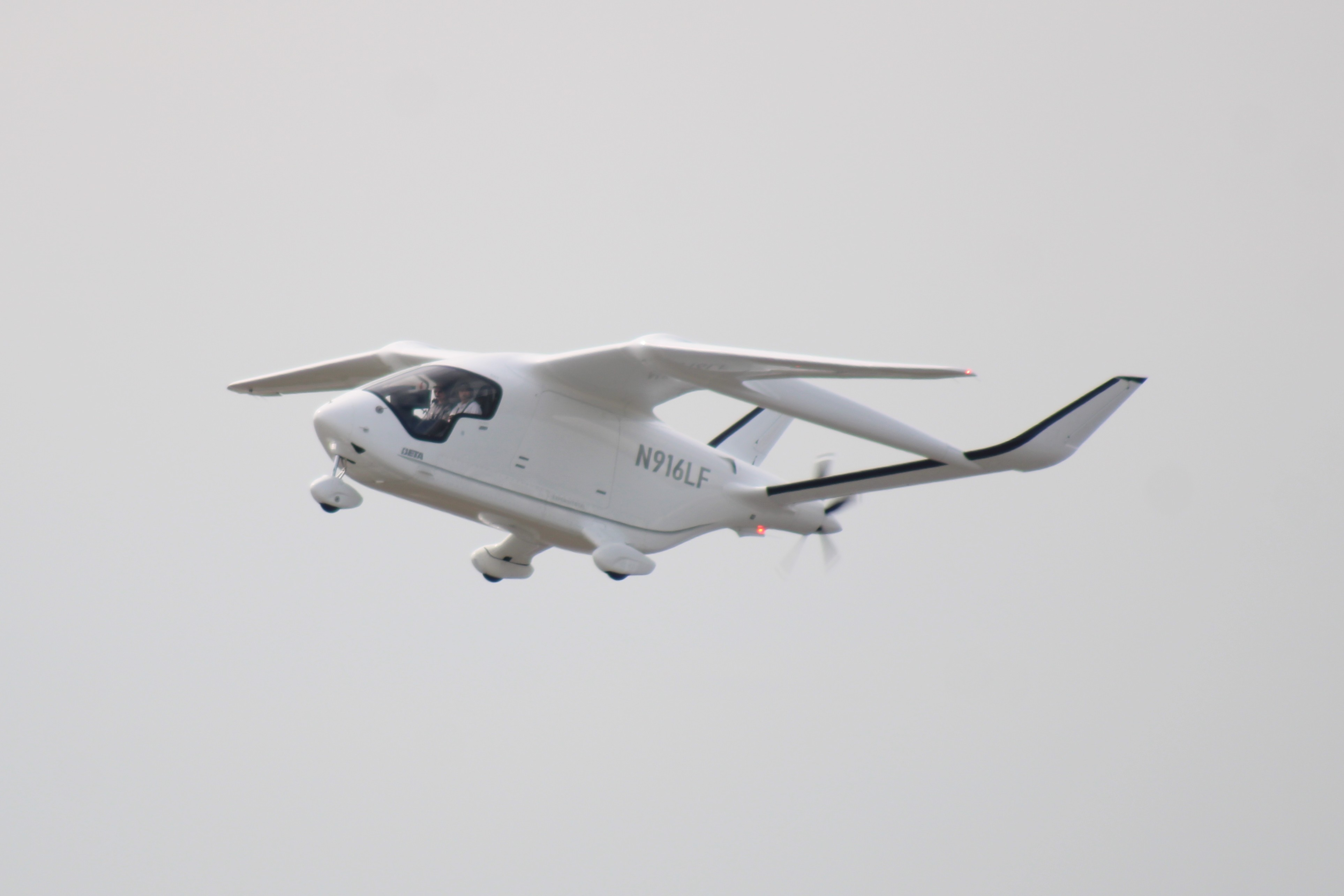
Alia CX300 in flight

A modern aircraft with a gull wing design is the electric utility aircraft Alia CX300 built by Beta Technologies.

Examples:

- PZL P.1
- PZL P.6
- PZL P.7
- PZL P.8
- PZL P.11
- PZL P.24
- Henschel Hs 121
- Loire 46
- Polikarpov I-153
- Alia CX300

== Inverted gull wing ==
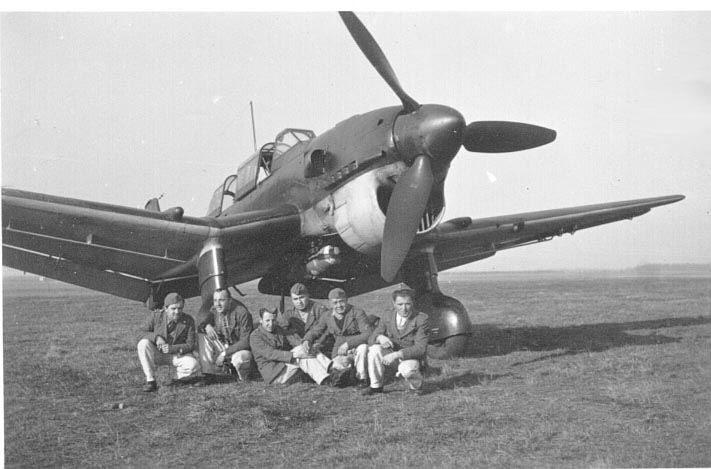
Junkers Ju 87 Stuka German ground-attack aircraft of WWII

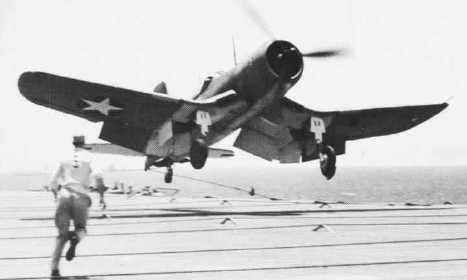
F4U Corsair landing on USS Bunker Hill

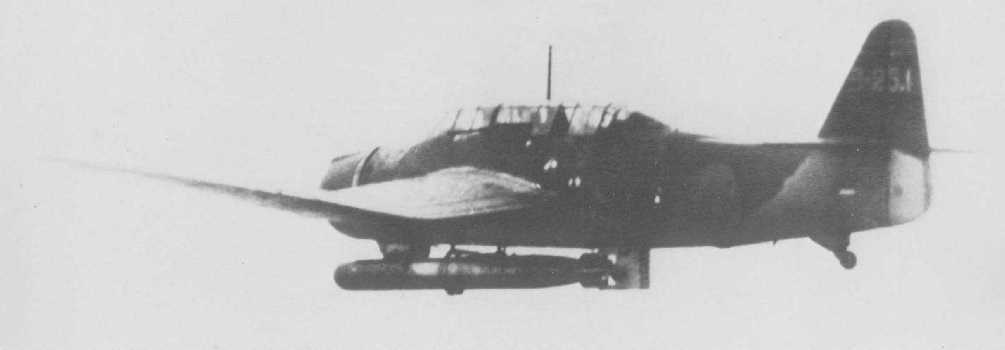
Aichi B7A carrying torpedo.

During the 1930s, a derivative of the standard design, known as the inverted gull wing, was developed. It was chiefly used on single-engine military aircraft with increasingly powerful engines. Before contra-rotating propellers came into use, such powers required larger diameter propellers, but clearance between the propeller tip and ground had to be maintained. Long landing gear legs are heavy, bulky, and weaker than their shorter counterparts. The Vought F4U Corsair, designed from the onset as a carrier-based fighter, not only had the largest propeller of any U.S. fighter, but was also expected to face rough landings aboard a pitching carrier deck. By adopting the inverted gull wing, the landing gear could be shorter and allowed to retract straight back (while twisting through 90º to place the mainwheels atop the lower gear strut ends), the latter factor improving internal wing space. The anhedral of the wing's center-section also permitted the wing and fuselage to meet at the optimum angle for minimizing drag, without using wing root fairings or other measures.

Another reason for having an inverted gull wing is to permit clearance for a large external bomb load, as on the Junkers Ju 87 Stuka. The inverted gull wing has been described by aviation author Manfred Griehl as being the most distinctive feature of the Ju 87. These wings, which comprised conventional Junkers double-wing construction, reportedly gave the Ju 87 a considerable advantage over its contemporaries during take-off; relatively large lift forces were created through the aerofoil even when flown at a shallow angle, reducing take-off and landing runs. They also provided a high level of ground visibility to the pilot, as well as enabling the use of a shorter undercarriage.

Examples:

- Aichi B7A
- Blohm & Voss Ha 137
- Caproni Sauro-1
- Junkers Ju 87 Stuka
- Mitsubishi A5M first prototype
- Vought F4U Corsair
- Yermolayev Yer-2
