= DFS 194 =

German rocket-powered aircraft prototype

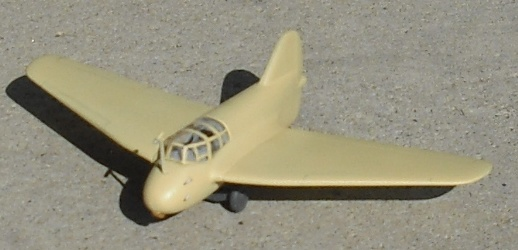
- Model of DFS 194

General information
- Type: Experimental
- Manufacturer: Deutsche Forschungsanstalt für Segelflug
- Designer: Alexander Lippisch
- Primary user: Luftwaffe
- Number built: One

History
- First flight: 1940
- Developed from: DFS 40
- Variant: Messerschmitt Me 163

The DFS 194 was a rocket-powered aircraft designed by Alexander Lippisch at the Deutsche Forschungsanstalt für Segelflug (DFS - "German Institute for Sailplane Flight").

== Design and development ==
The DFS 194 was based on the Alexander Lippisch Delta series of tailless designs. As originally conceived, it would have been a tailless aircraft similar to his DFS 40, powered by a conventional piston engine driving a pusher propeller. The airframe was completed in this configuration in March 1938.

Lippisch's designs had attracted the attention of the Reichsluftfahrtministerium (RLM - Reich Aviation Ministry) who believed that tailless aircraft were the best basis for a rocket-powered fighter. On January 2, 1939, Lippisch and his team were transferred to the Messerschmitt company to begin work on such an aircraft, under what was known as Project X. The DFS-194 was modified to accept a Walter R I-203 rocket engine designed by Hellmuth Walter, and by October, the aircraft was undergoing engine tests at Peenemünde.

These were followed by glide tests in early 1940 leading to the first powered flight in August with Heini Dittmar at the controls. The flight went well, the DFS 194 reaching 550 km/h (340 mph), bettering the speed of the earlier (20 July 1939), Walter rocket powered Heinkel He 176.

The aircraft proved to have excellent flying characteristics and proved safe to fly at nearly twice the anticipated speed. These results paved the way for the next stage of the project, which now received priority status from the RLM. The Messerschmitt Me 163, a considerably refined design along the same basic lines, flew the following year.

== Specifications ==
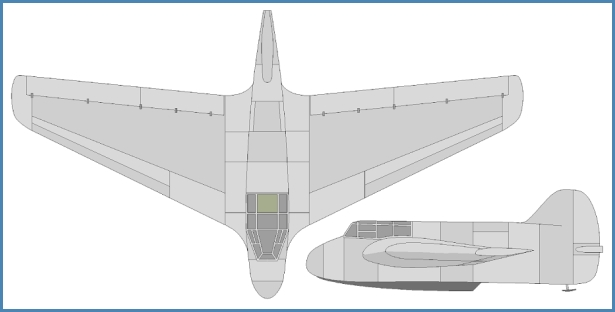
DFS 194

Data from www.wardrawings.be

General characteristics

- Crew: one, pilot
- Length: 6.4 m (20 ft 11 in)
- Wingspan: 10.4 m (34 ft 1 in)
- Height: 2.13 m (7 ft)
- Wing area: 18 m^{2} (193 ft^{2})
- Loaded weight: 2,100 kg (4,620 lb)
- Powerplant: 1× Walter R I-203 rocket, 3.9 kN (882 lbf) 3.9 kN

Performance

- Maximum speed: 550 km/h (343 mph)
- Rate of climb: 1,615 m/min (5,297 ft/min)

== See also ==
Related development

- DFS 39
- DFS 40
- Messerschmitt Me 163

Aircraft of comparable role, configuration, and era

- Focke-Wulf Volksjäger
- Junkers Ju 248
- Mikoyan-Gurevich I-270

Related lists

- List of military aircraft of Germany
- List of Luftwaffe aircraft prototype projects during World War II
- List of rocket-powered aircraft
