= RRG Fafnir 2 =

German single-seat glider, 1934

Fafnir 2
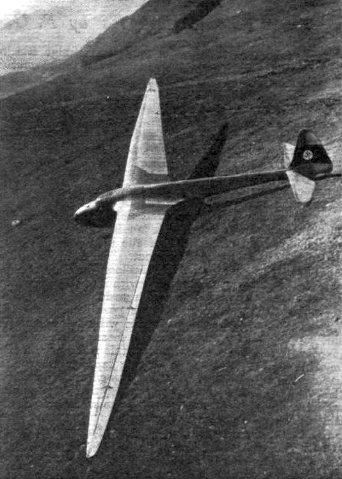

General information
- Type: High performance glider
- National origin: Germany
- Manufacturer: Rhön-Rossitten Gesellschaft (RRG)
- Designer: Alexander Lippisch
- Number built: 1

History
- First flight: c. July 1934

The RRG Fafnir 2 São Paulo, named after the legendary dragon and the Brazilian city which partially financed it, was a single seat German high performance glider designed by Alexander Lippisch. It set a new world distance record in 1934 and won the 1937 International Gliding Championships.

== Design and development ==
Lippisch began the design of the Fafnir 2 in 1934. Apart from being a wood and fabric aircraft with a strongly tapered cantilever gull wing, it had little in common with the Fafnir of 1930, though lessons had been learned from that design. During 1934 the RRG was disbanded and its technical section, led by Lippisch, moved from the Wasserkuppe to Darmstadt to become the DFS, so the new glider was sometimes known as the DFS Fafnir 2. It was Lippisch's last conventional glider design.

The most immediately obvious difference between the two designs was that the Fafnir 2 was a mid-wing aircraft. The original Fafnir had a high wing and initially suffered serious aerodynamic drag losses at the wing-fuselage junctions. Wind tunnel studies at the University of Göttingen showed that these losses were lower with mid-wing designs. They also suggested that the wing and fuselage be integrated and the latter be cambered to provide some lift. The strongly tapered wing was ply covered ahead of the single spar, forming a torsion resisting D-box, and fabric covered aft over most of the span, though the surface near the fuselage was wholly ply covered. The wing section, designed by Lippisch himself, was much thinner and less cambered than on the Fafnir, with less low speed lift but also less high speed drag, reflecting the increasing understanding that cross country gliding required speed between thermals as well as the ability to climb within them. As on the original Fafnir, only the inner 40% of the span had dihedral. Tapered ailerons, their chord increasing outwards, occupied all the trailing edge of the outer panels.

The Fafnir 2's fuselage was carefully streamlined with a ply skin and had an underlying oval cross section, but the requirement to produce a camber form which blended into the wing made the detailed shaping complex and time-consuming to build. Close to the root, the wing-fuselage extended well ahead and further behind the wing. The tail was conventional, with fabric-covered control surfaces. The fin was ply-covered and more substantial than on the earlier Fafnir, reaching to the top of the rudder, which was straighter-edged and with a sturdier heel. An all-moving tapered elevator with an unswept leading edge and a trailing edge notch for rudder movement was mounted on the fuselage mid-line.

The Fafnir 2 landed on a long skid, running from the nose almost to the wing trailing edge. A drop-off dolly was sometimes used for take-off. When first built its cockpit, ahead of the wing leading edge, had a stepped, multi-framed glazed canopy though by 1937 this had been reworked to blend smoothly into the forward fuselage line.

== Operational history ==
The Fafnir 2 took part in the July 1934 Rhön competition on the Wasserkuppe, from where it set a new world distance record on 27 July of 375 km (233 mi) when Heini Dittmar flew it to Luban in Czechoslovakia. It was the best glider of those at the 1934 Rhön, with a measured glide ratio of 26:1, a good figure for the time but not sufficiently outstanding to invite imitations, given the complexity and expense of the wing/fuselage blending. Nonetheless, even three years later Dittmar flew it to win the 1937 International Championships, held at the Wasserkuppe from 4–17 August and regarded as the first World Gliding Championships.

== Specifications ==
Data from Simons (2006)

General characteristics

- Crew: One
- Length: 7.91 m (25 ft 11 in)
- Wingspan: 19.00 m (62 ft 4 in)
- Height: 1.81 m (5 ft 11 in) in flying position
- Wing area: 19 m^{2} (200 sq ft)
- Aspect ratio: 19
- Empty weight: 270 kg (595 lb)
- Gross weight: 350 kg (772 lb)

Performance

- Maximum glide ratio: 26:1, measured
- Wing loading: 18.42 kg/m^{2} (3.77 lb/sq ft)
