= Avia 40-P =

Single-seat French glider, 1935

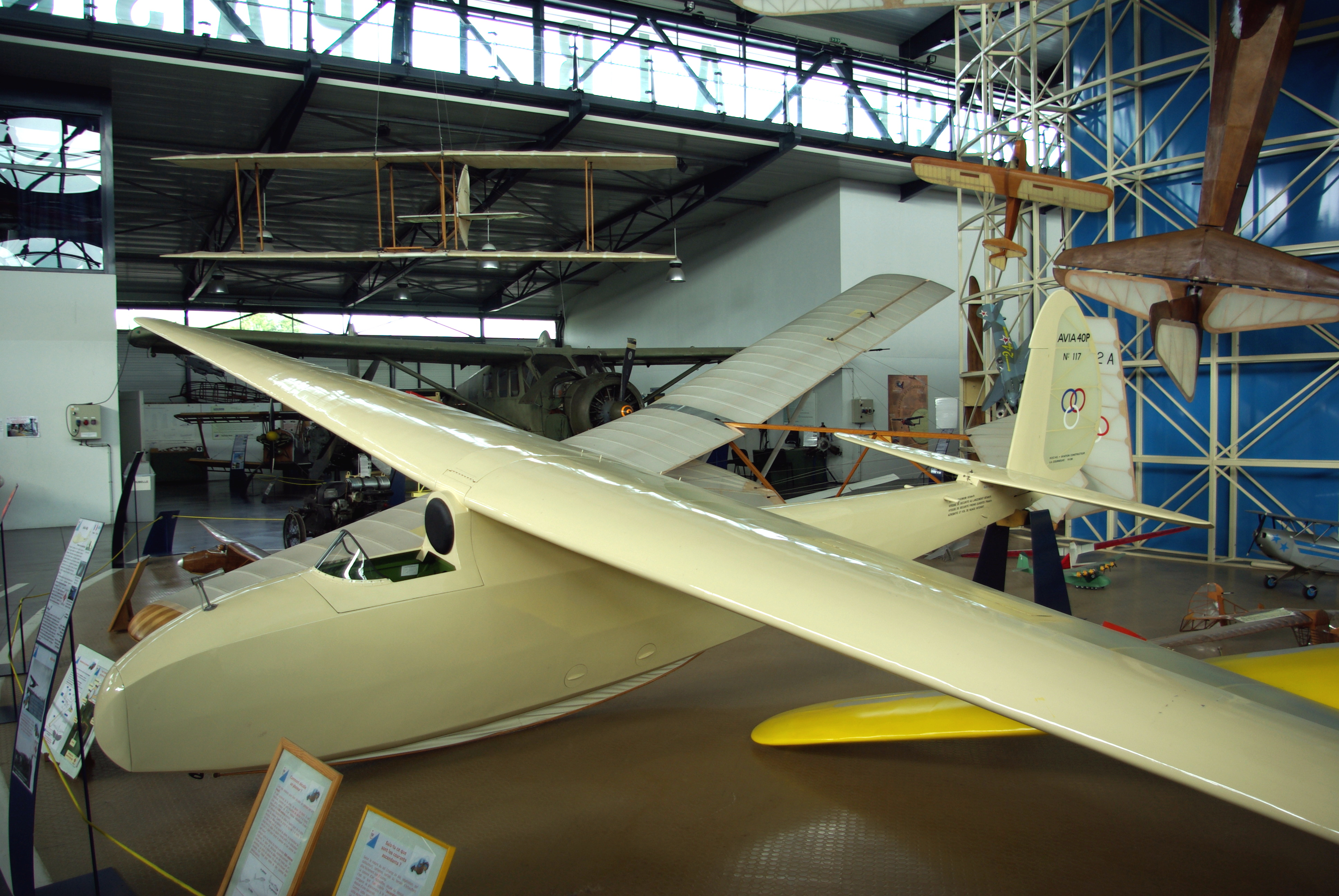
- Avia 40-P n°117 in display at the aircraft museum of Angers-MArcé (France).

General information
- Type: Club and record-setting glider
- National origin: France
- Manufacturer: Avia (Ateliers vosgiens d'industrie aéronautique)
- Designer: Cartier
- Number built: > 40

History
- First flight: 30 May 1935

The Avia 40-P was intended as an economical glider suitable for clubs and individuals but with a competitive performance capable of record setting. It was the most popular pre-war French glider, with more than forty built and it continued to set records immediately after World War II.

== Design and development ==
Avia's national record setting 18.75 m (61 ft 6 in) span Avia 41-P, first flown in 1933 was very effective in the hands of an experienced pilot but its cost limited its sales. They therefore decided to market a smaller glider, designed by Cartier, with a span of 14.9 m (48 ft 11 in) which would be less costly and easier for the typical club pilot to manage. The result was the Avia 40-P, first flown (despite the number) in 1935. It became the best-selling French glider in the late pre-war period, with over forty produced.

The 40-P was similar in layout and construction to its larger forebear. Though the smaller span reduced the aspect ratio from 19.4 to 14.5, increasing the induced drag, it allowed a reduction of profile drag by the introduction of a cantilever wing without bracing struts. The wings of the Avia 40-P had unbroken straight taper in plan, lacked the strong camber of the 41-P's centre section, and were built around plywood leading edge torsion box spars. Behind the spars the wings were fabric covered apart from the long span ailerons, which filled about two thirds of the trailing edges. New wing features were the upper surface spoilers, mounted on the rear of the box spar just inboard of the ailerons.

The wings were mounted on a low fuselage pylon, with the open cockpit immediately ahead of it. The 40-P's fuselage was oval in cross-section, tapering to the tail and entirely ply covered. There was a landing skid under the forward fuselage and the wing aided, by a tail bumper. As on the 41-P, the ply covered fixed fin and tailplane were very narrow, with generous, fabric covered control surfaces. Its tailplane was mounted on top of the fuselage and far enough forward that only a shallow reduction in elevator chord near the root was needed for movement of the rudder, which extended to the fuselage keel.

The 40-P flew for the first time on 3 May 1935, piloted by Eric Nessler. At least forty were built, including ten in the then French colony of Algeria; one source puts the total at 125. They were chiefly used for cross country flights, in height gained (above the point of departure) competitions and for record setting; the type established several new national records and the women's height gain world record was set at 1,184 m (3,885 ft) by Edmée Jarland on 18 April 1938. Production of the Avia 40-P continued into World War II, despite the occupation of France. At its end, new women's national records were again established with the 40-P, notably the straight line distance record of 139.24 km (86.52 mi) set by Marcelle Choisnet in June 1944 and the duration record of 16 hrs 44 mins by Suzanne Melk in October 1946.

The number that survived the war is also uncertain but it is known that three of the fourteen taken to Germany and used to train Hitler Youth pilots were recovered by British troops. One at least was returned to the United Kingdom and flew there until the 1970s. Restored in the 1990s, its owner moved to France and flew it at Saint-Aubin, Lot-et-Garonne. It remains airworthy, though it only flies rarely, and is on display at the Musée Régional de l'Air at Angers – Loire Airport. Another 40-P, which is not airworthy, is on display at the Musée de l'Air et de l'Espace.

== Specifications ==
Data from Simons, p.189

General characteristics

- Crew: One
- Length: 6.8 m (22 ft 4 in)
- Wingspan: 14.9 m (48 ft 11 in)
- Wing area: 15.35 m^{2} (165.2 sq ft)
- Aspect ratio: 14.5
- Empty weight: 146 kg (322 lb)
- Gross weight: 250 kg (551 lb)
