= Collins Aerodyne =

General information
- Type: Experimental VTOL Aircraft
- Manufacturer: Collins Radio Company
- Designer: Alexander Lippisch
- Number built: 1

The Collins Aerodyne was an experimental VTOL-Aircraft, which was developed by the Collins Radio Company in the 1950s. Head engineer was Alexander Lippisch.

== VTOL principle ==
The Collins Aerodyne had a barrel-like fuselage with a ducted fan, similar to the Stipa-Caproni aircraft from the 1932, the "Flying Barrel". Different from the Stipa-Caproni, the Collins Aerodyne had no wings, but a vectored thrust lift system. The air exiting the fuselage's rear was supposed to be deflected downwards by movable outlet vanes, thus providing lift.

== Propulsion ==
The propellers inside the barrel-like fuselage were powered by two Lycoming 0435 engines.

== Operation ==
Only one prototype for wind tunnel testing was ever completed. The VTOL-Principle was not promising enough to justify further development. The prototype was not tested outside the wind tunnel. Later, Lippisch developed a similar prototype in Germany, the Dornier Aerodyne.
