= Fieseler F 3 =

German experimental aircraft

F 3
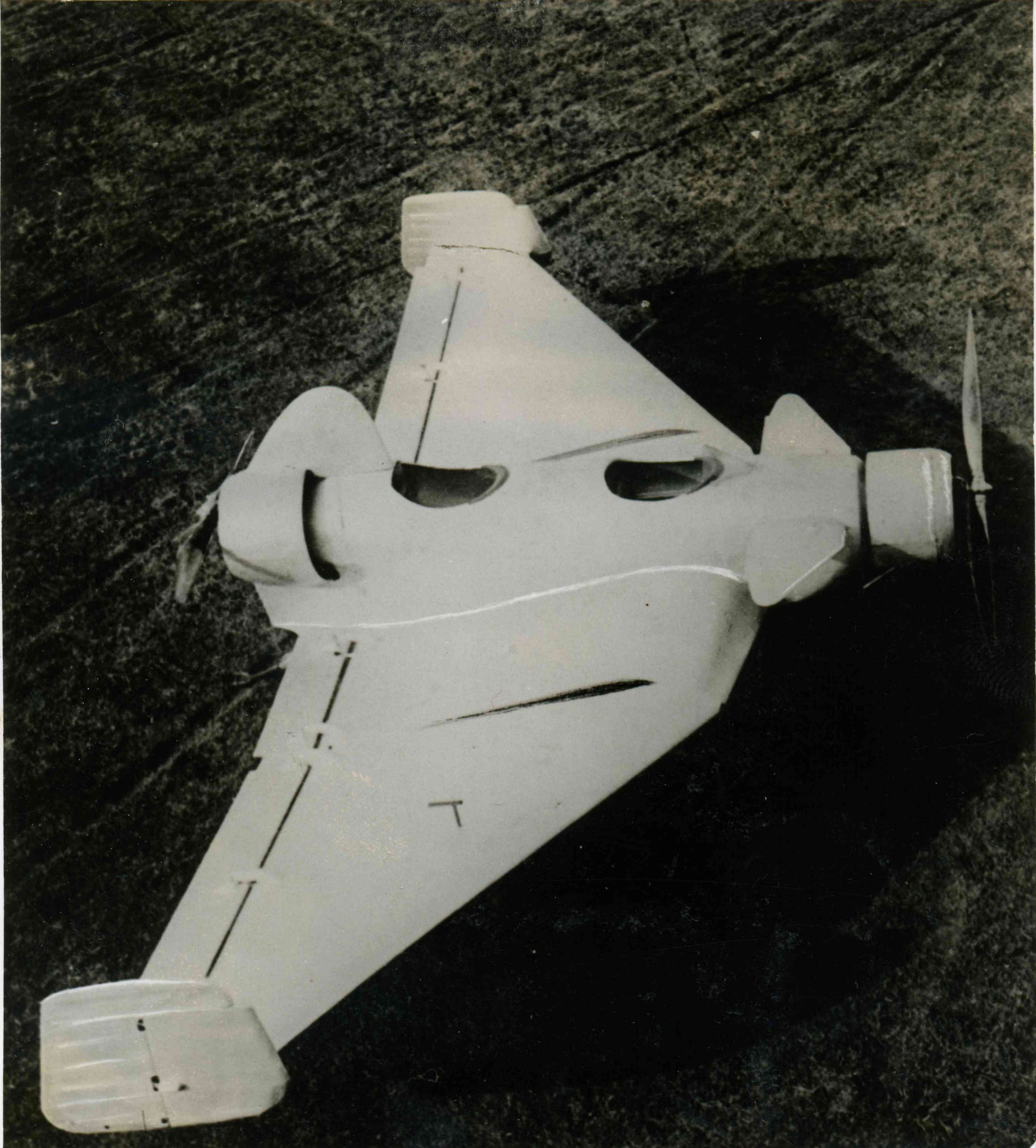

General information
- Type: Experimental
- National origin: Germany
- Manufacturer: Gerhard Fieseler
- Designer: Gerhard Fieseler
- Number built: 3

History
- First flight: ca. 1932
- Developed into: Lippisch Delta IV

The Fieseler F 3 Wespe ("Wasp") was a German aircraft designed by Alexander Lippisch as the Delta IV and built by Fieseler. Lippisch later redesignated its variants as the Delta IVa and b, with the c variant being built as the DFS 39.

Little history of the aircraft remains due in part to destruction of records and documents during World War II.

== Design and development ==
The aircraft was of canard layout, having a broad and lightly tapered delta wing with small foreplanes immediately in front of the leading edge. Twin endplate fins were attached to the wing tips. Power was provided by two radial engines in push-pull configuration. The seven cylinder Pobjoy R engines each provided 75-85 horsepower. A two-bladed propeller manufactured by Gustav Schwarz can be seen in some of the few remaining photos. The design featured folding wings. Different versions of the aircraft had either a fully enclosed "greenhouse" style canopy or two open cockpits. After the aircraft was determined to be generally uncontrollable, the project was transitioned to the Rhön-Rossitten Gesellschaft (RRG). The design was further evolved into the Lippisch Delta IVc.
