= DFS 40 =

Type of aircraft

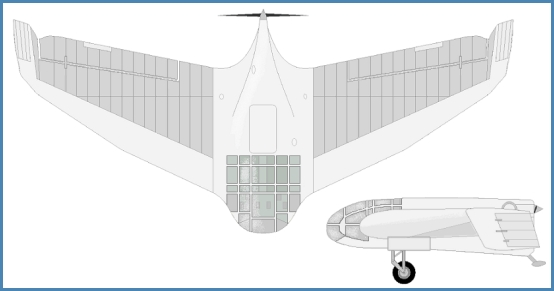

General information
- Type: Experimental Tailless aircraft
- National origin: Nazi Germany
- Manufacturer: Deutsche Forschungsanstalt für Segelflug (DFS)
- Designer: Alexander Lippisch
- Number built: 1

History
- First flight: 1939
- Developed from: Lippisch Delta IV
- Variants: DFS 194

The DFS 40 was a tailless research aircraft designed by Alexander Lippisch as the Delta V in 1937. The DFS 40 was a more advanced design than the previous DFS 39 (Delta IV), and was built for comparison with that aircraft.

Where the DFS 39 had a pronounced fuselage with low-mounted wing, the DFS 40 was closer to a flying wing, with the wing-fuselage junction blended so that there was no clear dividing line.

The DFS 40 was flown for the first time by Heini Dittmar in 1938, shortly before Lippisch departed the DFS (Deutsche Forschungsanstalt für Segelflug - German Research Institute for Sailplane Flight) to begin work at Messerschmitt, taking much of his design team with him. Soon afterwards, without Lippisch there to supervise the project, the aircraft was crashed due to an error in center of gravity calculations that resulted in it entering a flat spin during flight. While the test pilot escaped by parachute, the DFS 40 was destroyed.

== Specifications (DFS 40) ==
General characteristics

- Crew: 1
- Length: 5.1 m (16 ft 9 in)
- Wingspan: 12 m (39 ft 4 in)
- Powerplant: 1 × Argus As 8 4-cyl in-line piston engine, 89 kW (120 hp)

== Bibliography ==
- Ethell, Jeffrey L. (1978). Komet: The Messerschmitt 163. Shepperton, UK: Ian Allan. ISBN 0-7110-0827-2.
