= Weltensegler =

German single-seat glider, 1921

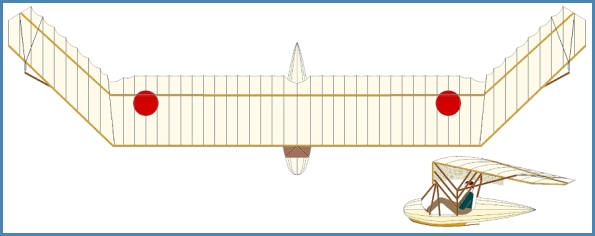

General information
- Type: Glider
- National origin: Germany
- Manufacturer: Weltensegler G.m.b.H.
- Designer: Friedrich Wenk
- Number built: 1

History
- First flight: 1921

Weltensegler G.m.b.H. was a German aircraft company formed by Friedrich Wenk, who became its Technical Director.

Wenk developed tailless gliders and entered one in the 1921 Rhön gliding competition held at the Wasserkuppe, from 8 August to 25 August 1921.

The aeronautical engineer Alexander Lippisch was an employee.

== History ==
Friedrich Wenk had experimented with model gliders since his teen-age years and discovered that tailless gliders would fly with swept back wings and forward centres of gravity. Stabilising moments in Wenk's designs were provided by swept back wing-tips set with negative incidence relative to the rest of the main-plane.

After limited success, Wenk was fortunate enough to secure financial backing, allowing him to form Weltensegler G.m.b.H. to design and build his designs.

In 1921 Weltensegler entered a glider in the Rhön competition.

That same spring, Lippisch designed the Falke, a low-wing monoplane which was structurally unsound. The wing was removed and tested as a hang glider, before being enlarged and, in the winter of 1921-22, incorporated in the Alexander training glider.

1923 saw Fritz Stamer design another training glider the Bremen, with Lippisch designing its wing. Lippisch also designed another trainer, Djävlar Annamar, which was a braced monoplane. The Steinmann Company would later build an improved version.

== The 1921 Rhön competition glider ==
=== Design and development ===
The glider built for the 1921 Rhön competition was a monoplane with a constant chord un-swept centre section extending to approx 2/3rds span with around 10 degrees dihedral. The wing-tips attached to the tips of the centre section were swept back at approx 45 degrees with washout increasing towards the tip, giving a gull like appearance. The structure of the wings was provided by the thin section ribs, spars and an open framework wire-braced truss under the wing surfaces from the tips of the centre section inboard to the pilots nacelle, which was underslung from the centre of the wing.

The flying controls for the Weltensegler were unorthodox and unique, consisting of a system of cables pulleys and springs, connected to a control stick for the pilot, to warp the wing-tips as desired. Pulling back on the stick increased the negative incidence of the wing-tips giving a nose up moment and vice versa pushing the stick forward released the tension on the springs in the circuit allowing the tips to decrease incidence, giving a nose down moment. Roll control was similar but differential with tension increased one side and released the other. The unusual method was unique in that the pilot had no direct control over the wing-tips relying on the incidence changing with the increase and release of tension in the springs. This system was also expected to confer increased stability in pitch and roll by automatic changes in wing-tip incidence.

=== Operational history ===
The Weltensegler was assembled at the Wasserkuppe and was ready for the competition on 14 August 1921. Piloted by Willy Leusch, Weltensegler's company test pilot, the glider was carried by the crew at a gentle trot and thrown forward into the breeze blowing up the slope of the Wasserkuppe. The Weltensegler flew smoothly, climbing to around 80m, but a turn to the left ended in disaster when the bank increased with the turn tightening into a spiral dive with increasing airspeed. The loads on the wing increased exponentially as the speed increased and soon the wing failed, fluttering to the ground with the unfortunate Leusch in the cockpit nacelle who was killed on impact.

Despite the very brief career of the Weltensegler, it was the first glider to gain height and soar, marking the beginning of the sport of gliding.

== Specifications (1921 competition glider) ==
Data from

General characteristics

- Crew: 1
- Wingspan: 16 m (52 ft 6 in)
- Wing area: 22 m^{2} (236.8 sq ft)

Performance

== See also ==
Aircraft of comparable role, configuration, and era

- Lippisch Storch I, II, III, IV
- Lippisch Storch V
- Lippisch Storch VI, VII, VIII "Marabu"
