= Lippisch Wien =

German single-seat glider, 1929

Wien
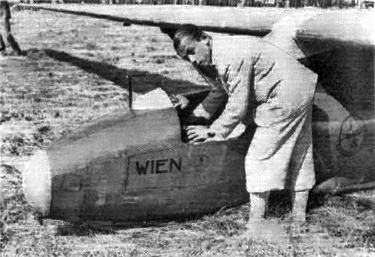
- Robert Kronfeld with the Wien in 1931

General information
- Type: High performance sailplane
- National origin: Germany
- Manufacturer: Gerhard Fiesler Werke
- Designer: Alexander Lippisch
- Primary user: Robert Kronfeld
- Number built: 1

History
- First flight: 1929
- Developed from: RRG Professor

The Lippisch Wien was a high-performance glider designed by Alexander Lippisch in Germany in 1929. Owned and flown by Robert Kronfeld, it was one of the first sailplanes intended to exploit thermals. It set world records both for distance and altitude and demonstrated the practicality of long-distance cross-country flights.

== Design and development ==
Robert Kronfeld was the overall winner of the 1928 Rhön Gliding Competition flying the RRG (Rhon-Rossitten-Gesellschaft) Professor. To remain competitive with the latest designs coming from the German universities, he asked Alexander Lippisch, the Professor's designer, for an improved version with better performance and handling. Lippisch's response was an elegant sailplane that Kronfeld named Wien after his home town. The Wien kept the layout of the Professor, with pylon-mounted single-spar wings braced with faired struts, but the span was increased by 3.0 m (9 ft 10 in), raising the aspect ratio from 14 to 19.6. The fuselage was redesigned to have a smooth ovoid section, finer aft than on the Professor and fitted with a more aerodynamically refined fin and rudder.

Both designs used a plywood-covered D-box forward of the spar, with fabric covering behind, and their 2.50 m (8 ft 2 in) half span, parallel chord inner wing panels were similar, though close to the fuselage the Wien's wing was strengthened with full chord plywood skin. The V-form bracing struts linked the extremes of these panels to the lower fuselage. The extra span of the Wien was in the double straight-tapered outer panels, which continued out to finer, rounded tips. Ailerons occupied the whole trailing edge of these sections.

The Wien's open cockpit was ahead of the wing leading edge. There was no windscreen, and the instruments, including the still novel variometer, were displayed horizontally, inset into the fuselage immediately in front of the pilot. The undercarriage consisted of a single enclosed skid and a small spring tailskid. The rear fixed surfaces, ply covered, were very narrow, though the root of the fin was carefully faired into the fuselage. The tapered control surfaces were fabric covered.

== Operational history ==
The Wien was capable of utilizing both ridge lift and thermals. Kronfeld used both methods in a series of ground breaking and often record setting flights between 1929 and 1931, learning much about thermal flying. On 15 May 1929 he made the first glider flight of more than 100 km (62 mi), largely ridge flying but with some thermal soaring. This was followed by at least three world distance records, the last between the Wasserkuppe and Marktredwitz, a distance of 164 km (102 mi) flown on 24 August 1930. Some very significant though not record breaking flights of about 160 km (99 mi) were made in August 1931 which used thermals alone and showed that on some days the distance that had to be flown between thermals was short. This was new information which, as it became widely known, opened up the potential of cross-country soaring.

Kronfeld also set two glider altitude records, the second flown on 30 July 1929 in thunderous conditions to a height of 2,560 m (8,400 ft). At the invitation of the British Gliding Association he and the Wien made a series of demonstration flights on a tour of England in the summer of 1931. During it he flew over London along the Thames and also won a £1,000 prize donated by the Daily Mail for a cross Channel flight. The North -South crossing, followed by a return flight, was made in July 1931; these did not use thermals but were direct glides from about 3,000 m (9,800 ft) after an aero-tow.

== Specifications ==
Data from Sailplanes 1920-1945

General characteristics

- Crew: One
- Length: 7.95 m (26 ft 1 in)
- Wingspan: 19.10 m (62 ft 8 in)
- Wing area: 18.6 m^{2} (200 sq ft)
- Aspect ratio: 19.6
- Airfoil: Root, Göttingen 549 modified with thickened nose and increased camber
- Empty weight: 158 kg (348 lb)
- Gross weight: 248 kg (547 lb)

Performance

- Wing loading: 13.8 kg/m^{2} (2.8 lb/sq ft)
