= Dittmar HD 153 Motor-Möwe =

West German light aircraft

HD 153 Motor-Möwe
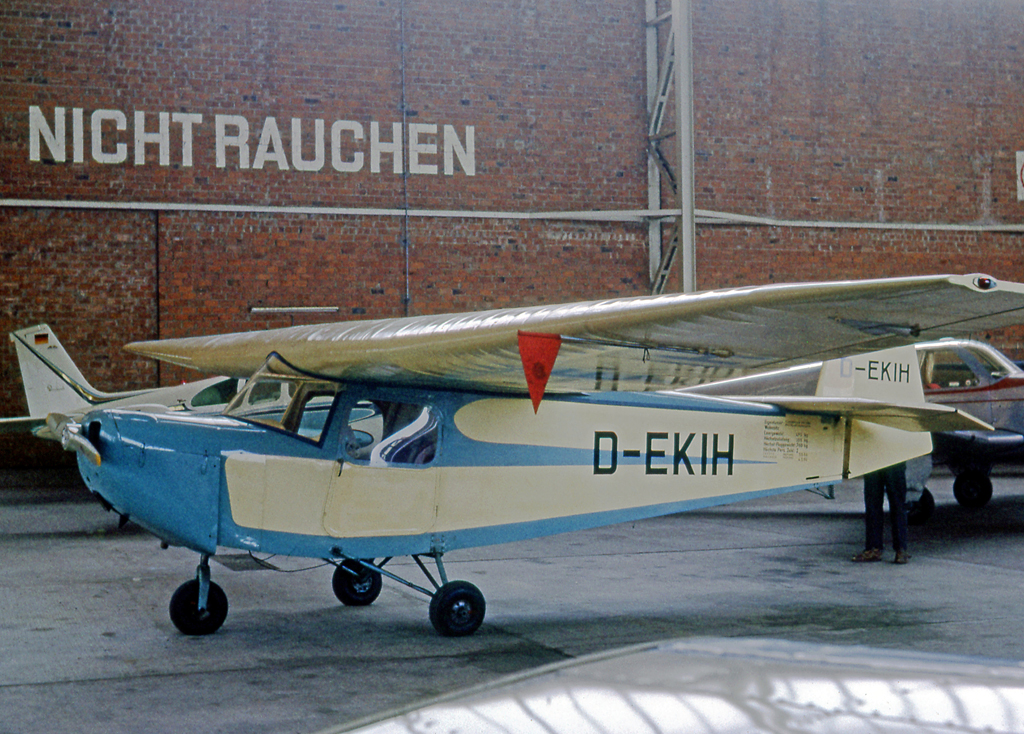
- HD 153A-1 Motor-Möwe two-seat aircraft at Stuttgart Airport in 1965

General information
- Type: Light civil utility aircraft
- National origin: West Germany
- Manufacturer: Dittmar
- Designer: Heini Dittmar
- Status: out of service
- Primary user: private pilot owners and aero clubs

History
- Introduction date: 1956
- First flight: November 1953
- Developed from: Dittmar HD 53 Möwe

The Dittmar HD 153 Motor-Möwe was a West German light aircraft that was first flown in November 1953.

== Design and development ==
The Motor-Möwe, designed by Heini Dittmar who had designed the Dittmar HD 53 Möwe sailplane, was a motorized development of this sailplane and was initially designed to be powered by engines of 48–63 kW (65–85 hp). The HD 153 prototype was a two-seat side-by-side high wing monoplane powered by a 48 kW (65 hp) Continental A65 engine and was of wooden construction with detachable wing and tail assemblies to facilitate road transportation when needed. A second prototype aircraft was fitted with a 45 kW (60 hp) Hirth engine.

== Operational history ==
The aircraft was designed for private and club use and served as a trainer and glider tug. Heini Dittmar, the aircraft’s designer, was killed in 1960 when his Motor-Möwe crashed near Essen/Mulheim airport. Small numbers of the type were completed by the end of 1960 and on 1 January 1961 four HD 153 and four HD 156 Motor–Möwen appeared in the West German civil aircraft register. In 1965 four HD 153 and five HD 156 Motor-Möwen were registered in West Germany. By 2007, no examples were known to be active.

== Variants ==
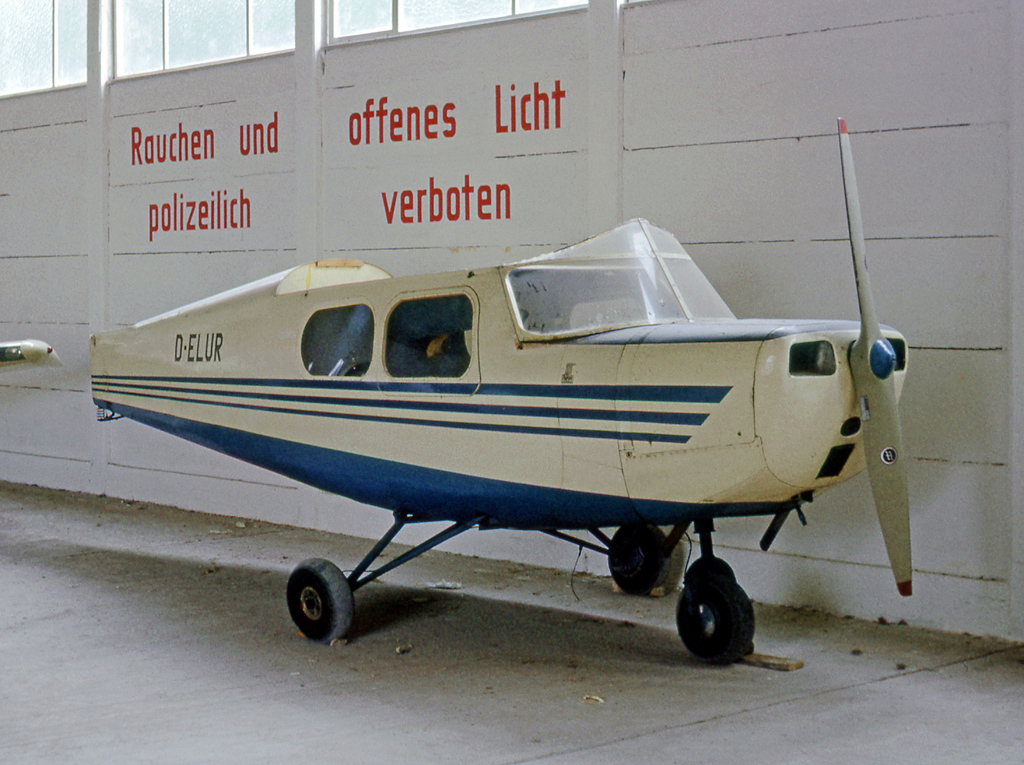
HD 156 three-seat aircraft showing the revised front and side cabin glazing of this model.

HD 153
two-seat aircraft

HD 153A-1
production two-seaters

HD 156
three-seat aircraft fitted with additional side windows

== Specifications (HD 153 with C90 engine) ==
Data from Jane's All the World's Aircraft 1958-59

General characteristics

- Crew: one
- Capacity: one passenger (334 kg (736 lb) payload)
- Length: 6.5 m (21 ft 4 in)
- Wingspan: 12 m (39 ft 4 in)
- Height: 2.1 m (6 ft 11 in)
- Wing area: 18.3 m^{2} (197 sq ft)
- Aspect ratio: 8.5
- Airfoil: Göttingen 367 modified
- Empty weight: 465 kg (1,025 lb) equipped
- Gross weight: 760 kg (1,676 lb)
- Fuel capacity: 140 L (36.98 US gal; 30.80 imp gal) in two wing tanks + optional 200 L (52.83 US gal; 43.99 imp gal) overload tank
- Powerplant: 1 × Continental C90-12F 4-cylinder air-cooled horizontally-opposed piston engine, 67 kW (90 hp)
- Propellers: 2-bladed Hoffman "HoCo" fixed pitch wooden propeller

Performance

- Maximum speed: 170 km/h (110 mph, 92 kn)
- Cruise speed: 150 km/h (93 mph, 81 kn)
- Landing speed: 65 km/h (40 mph; 35 kn)
- Range: 1,000 km (620 mi, 540 nmi)
- Ferry range: 1,872 km (1,163 mi, 1,011 nmi)
- Endurance: 4.5 hours (13 hours with overload tank)
- Service ceiling: 4,500 m (14,800 ft)
- Time to altitude: 1,000 m (3,300 ft) in 6 minutes
- Take-off run: 150 m (492 ft)
- Landing run: 130 m (427 ft)
