= MAN Turbo 6022 =

1960s German turboshaft aircraft engine

6022
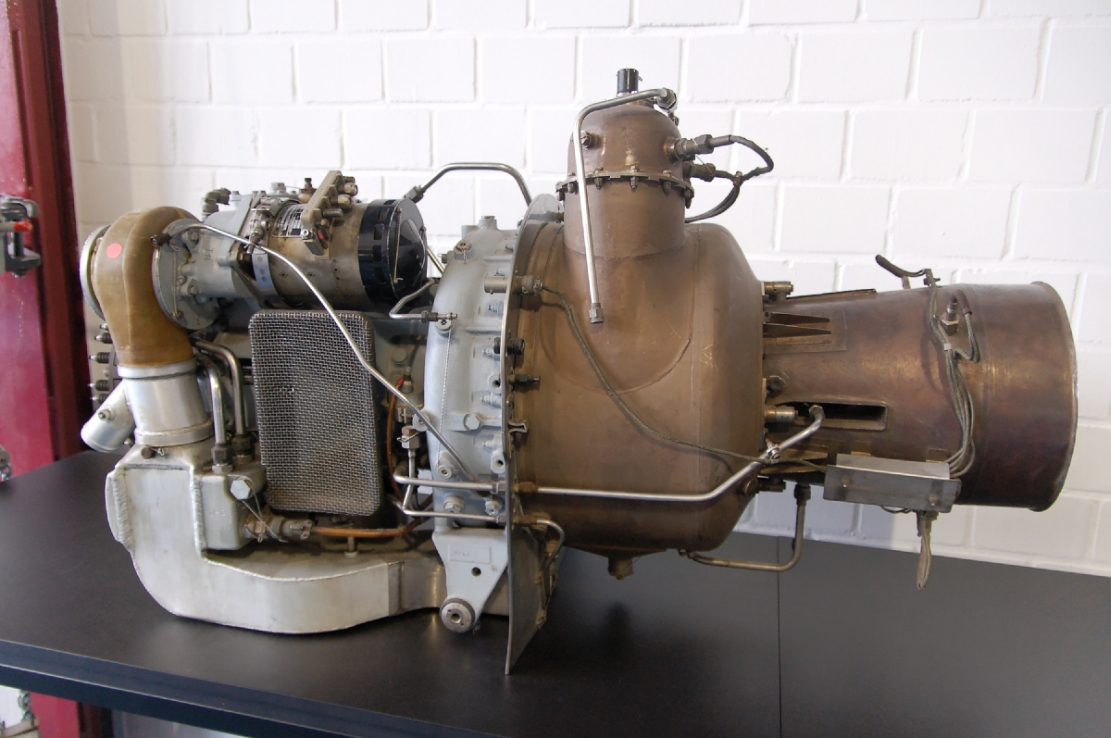
- MTU 6022 engine on display at the Hubschraubermuseum Bückeburg
- Type: Turboshaft
- National origin: Germany
- Manufacturer: MAN Turbo/MTU
- First run: 1962
- Major applications: MBB Bo 105
- Number built: 82

The MAN Turbo 6022 (also BMW 6022/MTU 6022) is a German gas turbine turboshaft engine for helicopter use. Designed in the early 1960s by BMW the engine powered the third prototype of the MBB Bo 105 on its maiden flight in December 1967.

== Variants ==
6022-A1
Base variant. 162 kW (217 shp) at 6,000 rpm.

6022-A2
260 kW (350 shp) at 6,000 rpm. Powered the third prototype Bo 105. Passed 100 hour type test in 1968.

6022-A3
280 kW (375 shp) at 6,000 rpm. Production engines for Bo 105 with strengthened reduction gear.

== Applications ==
- Dornier Aerodyne
- MBB Bo 105 (third prototype)

== Engines on display ==
- Hubschraubermuseum Bückeburg

== Specifications (6022-A3) ==
Data from Jane's all the World's Aircraft 1972–73, Aircraft engines of the World 1970

==== General characteristics ====
- Type: Turboshaft
- Length: 1,062 mm (41.8 in)
- Diameter: ~400 mm (16 in) casing diameter
- Width: 429 mm (16.9 in)
- Height: 670 mm (26 in)
- Dry weight: 90 kg (198 lb) (minus reduction gear and starter motor)

==== Components ====
- Compressor: Two-stage centrifugal
- Combustors: Single tube
- Turbine: Three-stage axial
- Fuel type: Jet fuel
- Oil system: pressure spray at 3.0 bar (44 psi) with return scavenge

==== Performance ====
- Maximum power output: 280 kW (375 shp)
- Overall pressure ratio: 6.4:1
- Air mass flow: 1.9 kg/s (4.2 lb/s)
- Turbine inlet temperature: JPT 863 K (590 °C)
- Specific fuel consumption: 0.45 kg/kWh (0.74 lb/(hp⋅h))
- Power-to-weight ratio: 3.11 kW/kg (1.89 shp/lb)

== See also ==
Comparable engines

- Allison Model 250
- Rolls-Royce Gem

Related lists

- List of aircraft engines
