= Avia 41-P =

Single-seat French glider, 1932

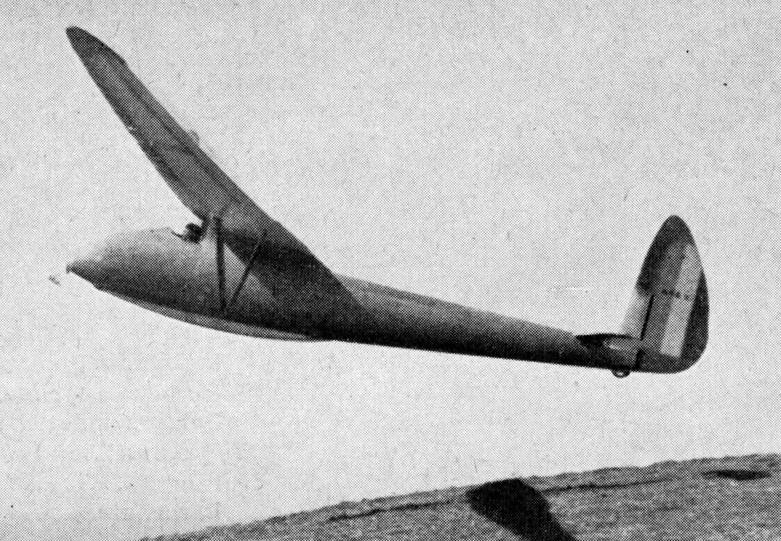

General information
- Type: High performance glider
- National origin: France
- Manufacturer: Avia (Ateliers vosgiens d'industrie aéronautique)
- Designer: Raymond Jarlaud and Eric Nessler
- Number built: c.7

History
- First flight: late 1932

The Avia 41-P was a high performance French glider. Eric Nessler set many new national gliding records in one between 1934 and 1938.

== Design and development ==
The Lippisch Wien, a German glider first flown in 1929, was the first aircraft to undertake cross-country flights using "blue sky" thermals rather than ridge lift or the thermals associated with cumulonimbus cloud. Most of the exploratory flights of the Wien were piloted by Robert Kronfield, who in 1931 brought it to the French competition held at the coastal site of Vauville. The French were impressed by the Wien and the Ateliers Vosgiens d'Industrie Aéronautique (Avia) company, founded in 1930, set about designing a similar high performance glider.

Though it was inspired by the Wien and followed its long span, high set, high aspect ratio wing layout, it differed significantly both structurally and aerodynamically. The project leader was Raymond Jarlaud, who was also responsible for the wing, with Eric Nessler designing the fuselage. Unlike the Wien's wing, that of the Avia 41-P was a two part structure, each half-wing having a rectangular plan centre section and a straight-tapered outer section, the latter dominating (80%) the span. The inner and outer airfoils were Göttingen 535, a thick and highly cambered section, and the flat bottomed Göttingen 527 respectively, different profiles from those of the Wien. They had a single spar formed by a leading edge, plywood covered torsion box which narrowed outwards. Behind this the wing was fabric covered. Broad chord ailerons occupied more than half the span, divided into two sections which moved separately to minimise torsion. On the first Avia 41-P the ailerons were fabric covered but the second and later examples had ply covering. Streamlined duraluminum V-struts from the lower fuselage braced the half-wings just inside the inner and outer section boundary.

The two half-wings were joined together over the fuselage on a low central pylon, placing the Avia's wing closer to the fuselage than on the Wien. Its fuselage was birch ply covered and built around four longerons. The open cockpit, placed immediately ahead of the wing pylon, was unusually narrow so Nessler introduced an unusual control column for a glider with a yoke for aileron control which minimised sideways movements of the pilot's hands. The fuselage tapered rearwards to an empennage with a very small, straight edged fin and tailplane. Its fin carried a generous, curved edge, fabric covered rudder which extended down to the keel and the separate elevators were similarly rounded. Its horizontal tail was mounted well forward on top of the fuselage so that the rudder hinge was ahead of the elevator trailing edge root. The Avia landed on a rubber-mounted skid under the forward fuselage and had a ring shaped tailskid.

The Avia 41-P flew for the first time in late 1932, piloted by Georges Bouvier. He had completed the test flights by mid-January 1934 and then took it on a France-wide demonstration tour which lasted until about September. In late August its part-designer Eric Nessler began a series of flights setting new French gliding records for distance and for duration. By the end of the year he had made a flight of 54 km (34 mi) and another lasting 11 hr 27 min, helping him to gain his Silver C badge in 1936. He was the first French pilot to do so.

The second example, completed in 1935, was the one mostly used by Nessler as chief pilot at the La Banne d'Ordanche gliding club to break most of French national gliding records, including a flight of 382 km (237 mi) in 1938. He also flew it as the French representative at international meetings in 1937 and 1938. Its cockpit was continuously revised, eventually gaining an enclosed canopy.

The Avia 41-P was designed to achieve the best performance and so was expensive to build but around five more followed the first two; these later aircraft were mostly used by the French Army in the period 1935-9. They were not identical; some, for example, had slight dihedral. After the occupation of France during World War II, Nessler's aircraft was taken to Germany in 1942. The third 41-P built, one of those with dihedral, survived the war and is currently in the reserve collection of the Musée de l'air et de l'espace at Le Bourget, though not on public display.

== Specifications ==
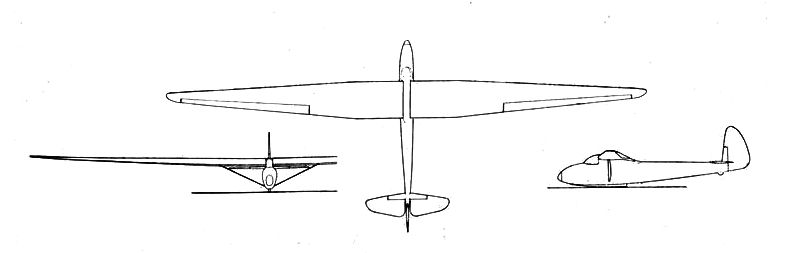
Avia 41-P 3-view drawing from L'Aerophile July 1932

Data from Les Ailes December 1932, p.3

General characteristics

- Crew: One
- Length: 7.425 m (24 ft 4 in)
- Wingspan: 18.75 m (61 ft 6 in)
- Wing area: 18.15 m^{2} (195.4 sq ft)
- Aspect ratio: 19.4
- Airfoil: Göttingen 535 on centre-section, Göttingen 527 outboard
- Empty weight: 165 kg (364 lb)
- Gross weight: 245 kg (540 lb)

Performance

- Lift-to-drag: 25

== See also ==
- List of gliders
