= RRG Professor =

German single-seat glider, 1928

Professor

General information
- Type: Soaring glider
- National origin: Germany
- Manufacturer: Rhön-Rossitten Gesellschaft (RRG)
- Designer: Alexander Lippisch

History
- First flight: May 1928

The RRG Professor was a very early soaring glider and the first to use a variometer for finding thermals. It was designed by Alexander Lippisch in Germany, first flying in 1928. The Professor was widely built by both flying clubs and factories.

== Design and development ==
In early 1928 Professor Walter Georgii, an academic meteorologist and head of the Rhön-Rossitten Gesellschaft (RRG), began studies of thermals, previously assumed to be too weak to assist gliders. He directed flights of a light, powered aircraft which, with its engine idling, discovered uplifts of several metres per second. At about the same time Alexander Lippisch, who had earlier worked at Dornier on Zeppelins was considering the application of the variometer to gliding. These rapid response rate of climb instruments were known in lighter-than-air craft but had not been used on gliders. The two came together to produce a glider, designed by Lippisch and built at the RRG that had the performance to utilize thermal lift detected by the variometer. The result was the RRG Professor, first flown in May 1928 and intended by RRG to be built in numbers by clubs under licence, from their plans. The prototype was christened the Rhöngeist (English: Ghost of the Rhön Mountains) after Lippisch, who had earned this nickname during earlier visits to the Wasserkuppe gliding centre.

This was an all wood-framed aircraft, covered in a mixture of plywood and fabric, with a braced, three piece wing supported over the fuselage on a tall ply skinned, streamlined pedestal and built around a single spar. From the spar forward around the leading edge the wing was ply skinned, forming a torsion box; behind the spar the wing was fabric covered. Its rectangular centre section occupied about one third of the overall span and was braced to the lower fuselage on each side with a faired V-form lift strut. The outer panels were strongly straight tapered, with a taper ratio of 1:3. The whole trailing edge of each outer section was filled with a straight edged, slightly tapered aileron.

The Professor's hexagonal, ply covered, deep flat sided fuselage tapered strongly aft. The pilot sat in an open, unscreened cockpit immediately ahead of the pedestal and equipped with the variometer. A rubber sprung skid on the underside reached from the nose to below the trailing edge. It had an all-moving tailplane, with an almost unswept leading edge but strongly curved aft, producing a pointed surface. Above it there was a short triangular fin, reaching back to the trailing edge of the tailplane, carrying a taller, full rudder with a straight, sloping edge but rounded top and heel. The rudder projected below the fuselage but was protected on landing by a small tail skid. The tail surfaces were all fabric covered behind the ply leading edges.

After its first flight on the Wasserkuppe in May 1928, the Rhöngeist joined the annual national competition there and made its mark with a flight on 6 August 1928, flown by Robert Kronfeld who found a thermal under a cloud, flew to mountains and slope soared, then returned against the wind to the Wasserkuppe, aided by more thermals en route. Almost immediately other pilots began to find lift under clouds.

Plans for the Professor were widely sold to commercial manufacturers and to clubs both in Germany and abroad, though the total number of Professors built, sometimes with small variations, is not known. One at least, constructed in Germany, came to the UK and was flown by Philip Wills. Two were built in the United States as Heller Hawks. Like other high performance gliders of it day, it was slow to come out of turns and with its strongly tapered wing, prone to tip stalling. The Professor II, first flown in 1929, addressed some of these problems by increasing the mean overall wing chord with fuller, curved ailerons, modifications first applied to the prototype Rhöngeist. The Professor II also had new horizontal tail with a fixed, swept tailplane mounting constant chord, rounded tip elevators with a cut-out for rudder movement.

== Variants ==
Professor
the original design. Flown 1928.
Professor II
larger area ailerons with curved trailing edges and a tailplane with conventional elevators. Flown 1929.

== Specifications ==
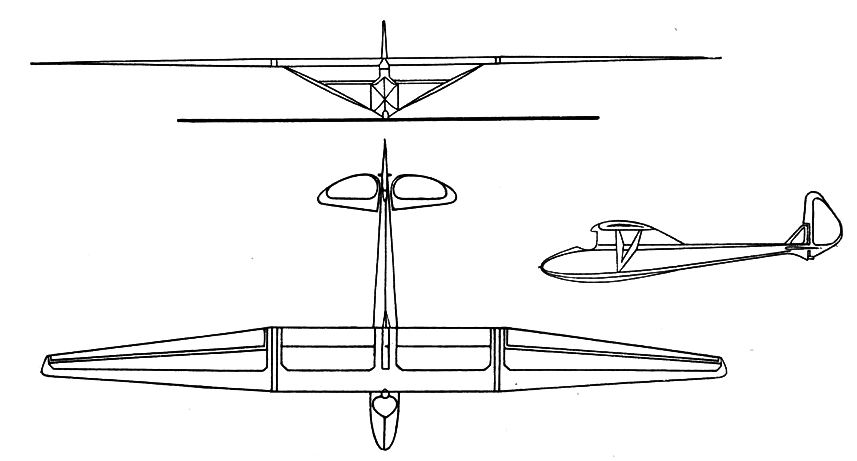
RRG Professor 3-view drawing from L'Aerophile March 1931

Data from Sailplanes 1920-1945

General characteristics

- Crew: One
- Length: 7.00 m (23 ft 0 in)
- Wingspan: 16.10 m (52 ft 10 in)
- Wing area: 18.6 m^{2} (200 sq ft)
- Aspect ratio: 14
- Airfoil: Göttingen 549
- Empty weight: 166 kg (366 lb)
- Gross weight: 246 kg (542 lb)

Performance

- Wing loading: 13.2 kg/m^{2} (2.7 lb/sq ft)
