= Lippisch Delta IV =

1936 experimental aircraft

DFS 39
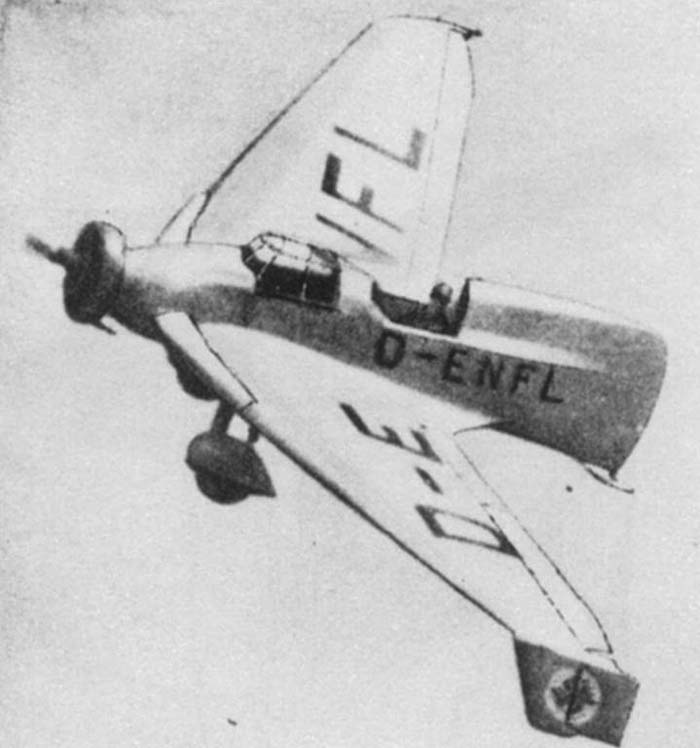

General information
- Type: Experimental
- Manufacturer: Deutsche Forschungsanstalt für Segelflug
- Designer: Alexander Lippisch
- Number built: 1

History
- First flight: 1936
- Developed from: Fieseler F 3
- Variant: DFS 40

Alexander Lippisch's Delta IV was a continuation of his work on delta wing designs pioneered in his Delta I, Delta II and Delta III aircraft.

== Design and development ==
=== Fieseler F 3 Wespe ===
The project began with an order from Gerhard Fieseler for a design that his company could build for him to fly in the 1932 Europarundflug air rally. The result was a highly unorthodox design, sporting large delta wings, canards, and an engine and propeller mounted in both the nose and tail of the plane.

Fieseler built this design as the F 3 Wespe ("Wasp"), but it proved highly unstable, causing Fieseler to crash it on his first flight. Further refinements were unable to correct these deficiencies, and after one final crash, Fieseler abandoned the aircraft.

=== DFS 39 ===
Lippisch continued to believe that the problems were surmountable, and found an ally in Professor Walter Georgii of the DFS (Deutsche Forschungsanstalt für Segelflug – German Research Institute for Sailplane Flight). Georgii secured funding from the RLM (Reichsluftfahrtministerium – Reich Air Ministry) to purchase the aircraft from Fieseler and work on perfecting it. At the DFS, Lippisch rebuilt the aircraft, removing the canards and the rear engine and renaming it the Delta IVa.

Although this flew much better than its predecessor, it was still involved in a very serious crash which led to an investigation of Lippisch's endeavours. The RLM and the DVL (Deutsche Versuchsanstalt für Luftfahrt – German Aviation Research Institute) eventually concluded that the Delta series was not only dangerous, but an aeronautical dead end. Only Georgii's continued support prevented them from ordering the discontinuation of the research.

The aircraft was rebuilt again, this time incorporating new aerodynamic refinements based on Lippisch's experiences with his recent Storch X glider. The new incarnation, dubbed Delta IVb proved to be a step in the right direction.

Success finally came with a last round of changes. The aircraft was rebuilt yet again, making the sweep of its wings less severe, and adding small, downturned fins at their tips. The fuselage was lengthened somewhat, and a small rudder was added to it. Now called the Delta IVc, the result was finally what Lippisch had been looking for. In 1936, the aircraft was taken to the Luftwaffe flight-testing centre at Rechlin where test pilot Heini Dittmar put it through its paces, gaining an airworthiness certificate for the type and an official RLM designation – DFS 39.

=== Messerschmitt Me 163 ===
It proved to be an extremely stable and well-behaved design, and now attracted the interest of the RLM as the basis for a rocket-powered research aircraft. The work was kept secret and the new variant of the Delta IV referred to as Project X. The airframe was to make significant use of metal construction, which was not available at the DFS, so Lippisch and Projekt X were transferred to Messerschmitt. It was redesignated the Me 163 and would eventually appear as the Messerschmitt Me 163 Komet rocket fighter.

== Specifications (DFS 39d) ==
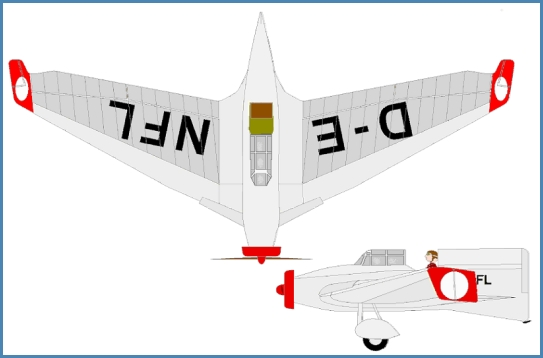
Lippisch DFS 39, 1936

Data from Die Deutsche Luftrüstung 1933–1945 Vol.1 – AEG-Dornier

General characteristics

- Crew: 2
- Length: 5.4 m (17 ft 9 in)
- Wingspan: 9.6 m (31 ft 6 in)
- Height: 1.8 m (5 ft 11 in)
- Wing area: 13.4 m^{2} (144 sq ft)
- Empty weight: 390 kg (860 lb)
- Max takeoff weight: 600 kg (1,323 lb)
- Fuel capacity: 150 L (40 US gal; 33 imp gal) fuel; 16 L (4.2 US gal; 3.5 imp gal) oil
- Powerplant: 1 × Pobjoy R 7-cylinder air-cooled geared radial piston engine 85 PS (84 hp; 63 kW)
- Propellers: 2-bladed wooden fixed-pitch propeller, 2.1 m (6 ft 11 in) diameter

Performance

- Maximum speed: 220 km/h (140 mph, 120 kn) at sea level
- Cruise speed: 180 km/h (110 mph, 97 kn)
- Landing speed:70 km/h (43 mph; 38 kn)
- Range: 1,350 km (840 mi, 730 nmi)
- Service ceiling: 6,300 m (20,700 ft)
- Rate of climb: 5.8 m/s (1,140 ft/min)
- Time to altitude: 1,000 m (3,300 ft) in 3 minutes
