= RRG Storch V =

Aircraft

Storch V
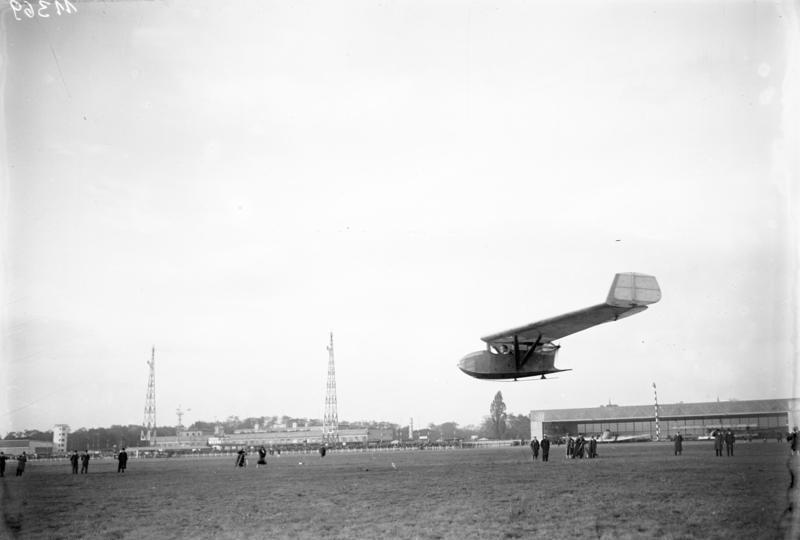

General information
- Type: Powered glider
- Manufacturer: Rhön-Rossitten Gesellschaft (RRG)
- Designer: Alexander Lippisch
- Number built: 1

History
- First flight: 1929

The RRG Storch V was the only member of Alexander Lippisch's Storch series of tailless aircraft to be powered. It flew successfully in the year 1929.

== Design and development ==
Before the Storch V, Lippisch had designed only gliders, many of them tailless. The first of these, the Espenlaub E.2, was built by Espenlaub in 1922 but Lippisch, at RRG from 1925, did not return to the tailless layout until 1927. Development progressed with a series of the Storch models; with the Storch IV he achieved a fully controllable aircraft which flew well. The Storch V was essentially the Storch IV with a small pusher configuration engine added behind the pilot.

The Storch V had a straight edged wing with about 17° of sweep on the leading edge and with only slight taper and dihedral. It was built around a plywood skinned D-box leading edge spar and a second spar near mid-chord and was fabric covered. Broad, lobate ailerons were hinged at right angles to the line of flight, protruding beyond the trailing edges and carrying small trim tabs not fitted to the Storch IV. Broad, low endplate fins and rudders of about equal area, cambered on their inner surfaces provided directional stability and control. Their profiles were lower and simpler than those on the Storch IV. The rudders could work together for steering and in opposition for braking.

Each wing was braced from a single point on the lower fuselage pod longeron to nose and rear spars at about 40% span by a faired V-strut. There were a pair of sturdy, faired, vertical struts between the upper pod and the wing centre. The pod was flat sided, with angled upper and lower surfaces and on the Storch IV projected back almost to a line between the aileron trailing edges to provide some yaw stability. On the Storch V this provided a place to mount a small DKW 5–7 kW (7–9 hp) air-cooled two-stroke engine in pusher configuration with its output shaft just lower than the wing. Enclosed within a humped, metal cowling, it proved difficult to cool, so it was generally run at less than full power. There was a landing skid under the pod which extended back past the end of the pod to protect the propeller.

The date of the first flight of the Storch V is not known but it was active during 1929 and flew well despite its low engine power. It finally crashed whilst demonstrating at Darmstadt in gusty conditions.

== Specifications ==
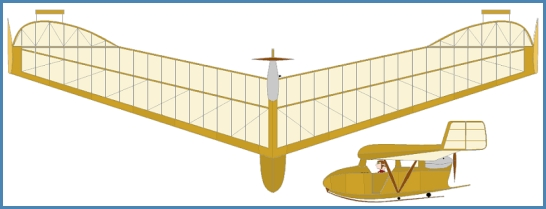

Data from L'Aerophile February 1930, p.39

General characteristics

- Crew: One
- Length: 3.80 m (12 ft 6 in)
- Wingspan: 12.37 m (40 ft 7 in)
- Height: 2.0 m (6 ft 7 in)
- Wing area: 18.5 m^{2} (199 sq ft)
- Aspect ratio: 8
- Empty weight: 170 kg (375 lb)
- Powerplant: 1 × DKW 500 cm^{3} (31 cu in) air-cooled 2-stroke piston engine, 5.2–6.7 kW (7–9 hp)
- Propellers: 2-bladed RRG, 1.24 m (4 ft 1 in) diameter

Performance

- Maximum speed: 125 km/h (78 mph, 67 kn) at 100 m (330 ft)

== See also ==
- List of tailless aircraft
