= Dornier Aerodyne =

Wingless VTOL unmanned aircraft

Aerodyne
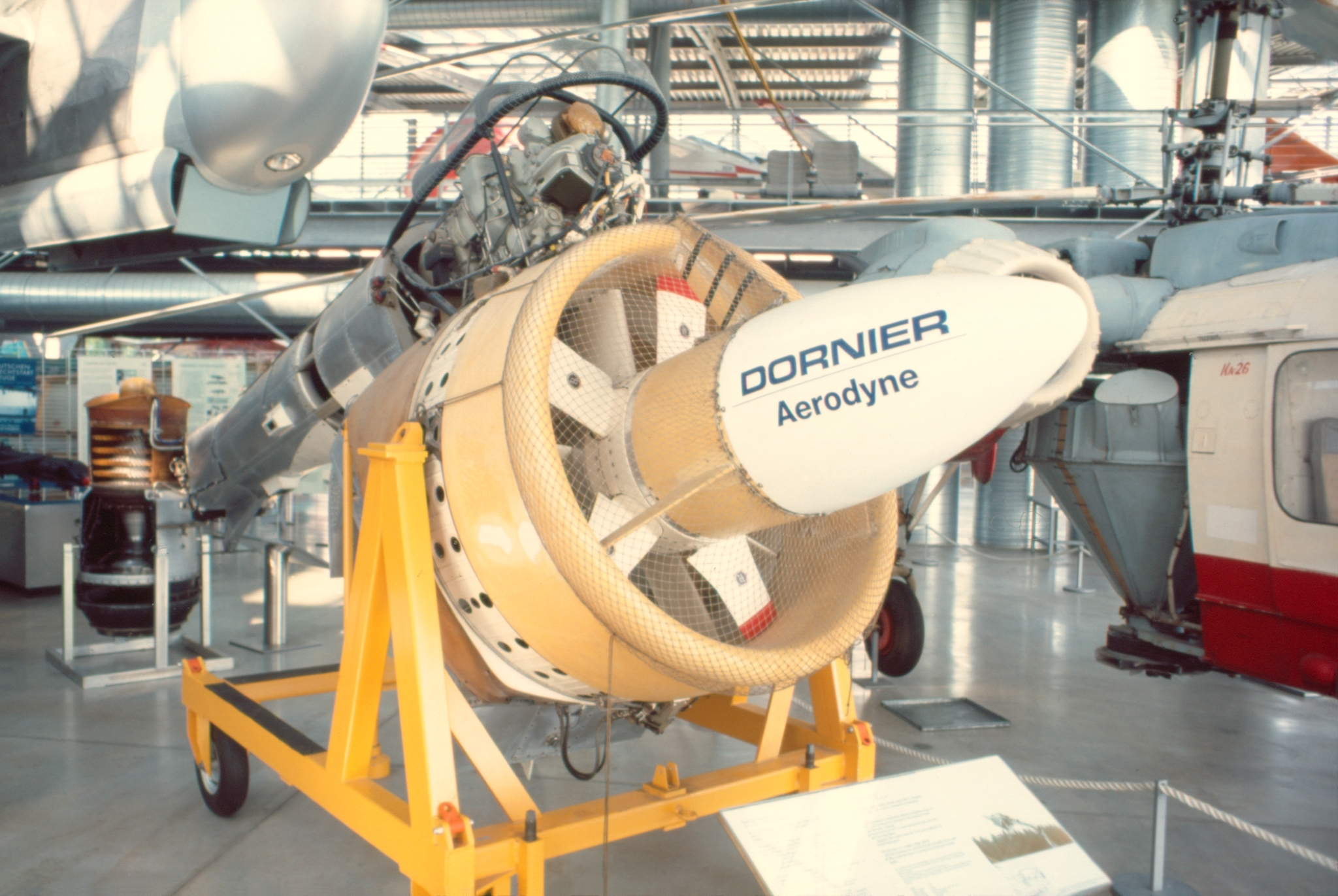
- The Aerodyne on display at the Deutsches Museum Flugwerft Schleissheim

General information
- Type: VTOL Experimental aircraft
- National origin: West Germany
- Manufacturer: Dornier Flugzeugwerke
- Designer: Alexander Lippisch
- Primary user: Federal German Ministry of Defence
- Number built: 1

History
- First flight: 18 September 1972
- Retired: 30 November 1972

The Dornier Aerodyne (also referred to as "Lippisch-Dornier Aerodyne") was a wingless VTOL unmanned aerial vehicle (UAV).

The Aerodyne was conceived of by the German aeronautical engineer Alexander Lippisch during the late 1950s. After attracting the support of the West German Federal Ministry of Defence, Dornier Flugzeugwerke was contracted to further develop the Aerodyne concept and produce a flight-capable prototype. Lippisch was part of the team. The first flight took place on 18 September 1972. The development ended on 30 November 1972 after successful hovering-flight testing with the aircraft. Experimentation did not continue due to lack of interest by the Bundeswehr (German Armed Forces), who reportedly favour the use of manned helicopters rather than UAVs to perform its aerial reconnaissance needs. The prototype Aerodyne has been preserved and put on public display at the Deutsches Museum.

== Development ==
The origins of the Aerodyne can be traced back to the work of a single individual, the German aeronautical engineer Alexander Lippisch. Between the 1910s and the 1960s, Lippisch conceived of dozens of radical aircraft designs, including various tailess and delta wing aircraft; one of his more unique designs to see service was the Messerschmitt Me 163 Komet, the only rocket-powered fighter to see combat. During the 1950s, while working in the United States, Lippisch started work on an entirely wingless aircraft - this would become the Aerodyne.

Lippisch envisioned such wingless aircraft in a variety of configurations and to perform various mission types, including those of vertical takeoff interceptors, bombers and fighters. In his early revisions of the concept, the Aerodyne was to be powered by a pair of coaxial propellers that would achieve vertical flight through the slipstream that was being diverted downwards through flaps. Flight control was to be achieved via the deflection of the slipstream towards the desired direction. During 1959, Lippisch secured a patent for the Aerodyne concept; and he continued to refine the design through the early 1960s.

During the mid 1960s, the Aerodyne concept caught the attention of the Federal Ministry of Defence of West Germany. In 1967, at the ministry's direction, access to the detailed design was secured and an arrangement with the German aircraft manufacturer Dornier Flugzeugwerke was implemented to construct a prototype. It would take five years to further develop the Aerodyne design as well as to construct the sole prototype.

On 18 September 1972, the prototype performed its maiden flight. Thereafter, flight testing proceeded, during which the prototype performed numerous hovering flights and control-related tests. The results gathered were reportedly successful, however, the flight test programme was terminated during November 1972. This outcome was reportedly due to a lack of interest from the Aerodyne' primary prospective customer, the Bundeswehr (German Armed Forces), which had decided to transfer the planned tasks of the UAV to manned helicopters instead. Since 2000, the prototype Aerodyne has been part of the collection of the Deutsches Museum.

== Description ==
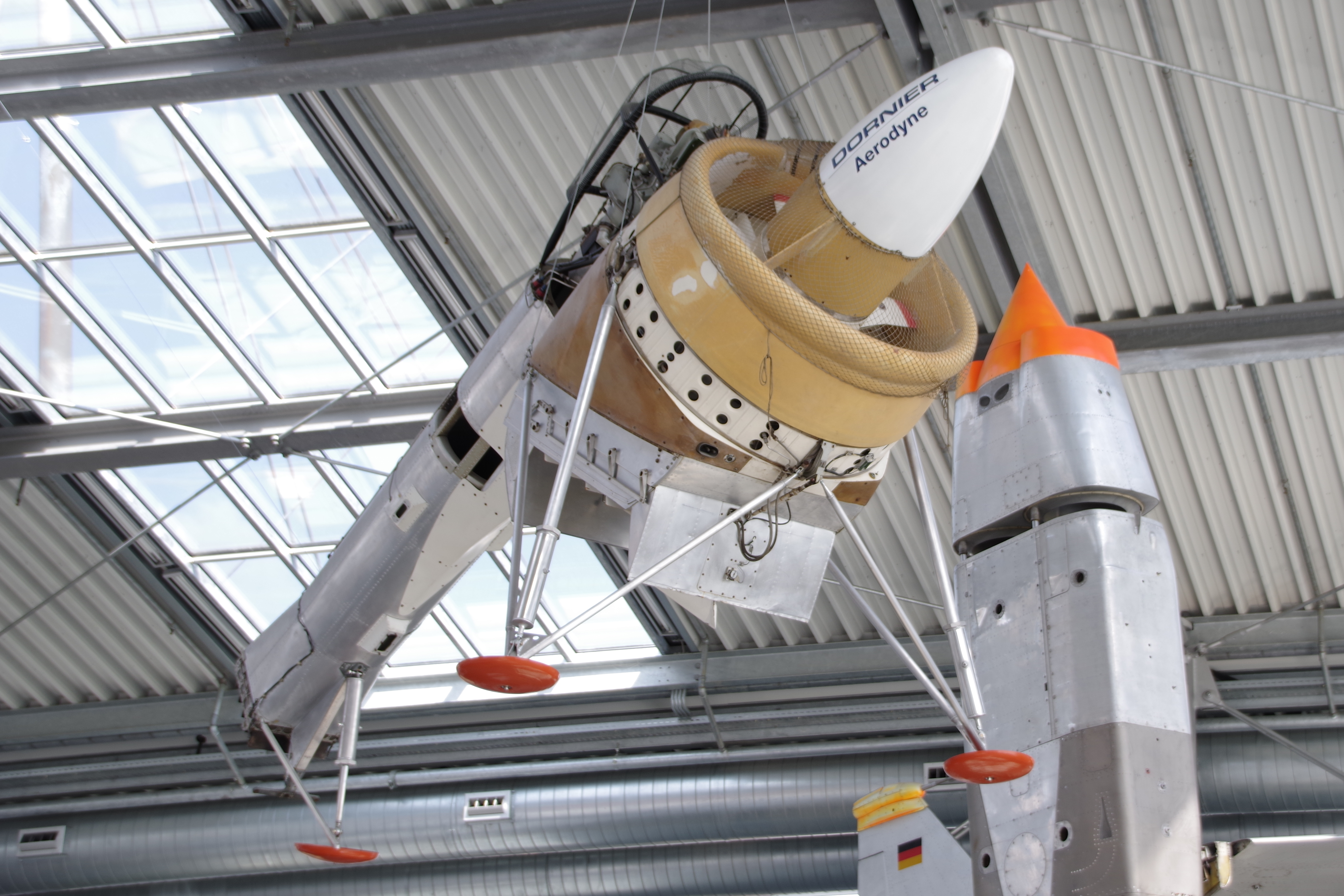
The preserved Aerodyne on static display at the Deutsches Museum, 2019

The principle behind the Aerodyne is the combination of lift and thrust production in a single construction unit and flow channel, i.e. a ducted fan. Flaps at the end of the fan divert the outflowing air to produce lift, thrust, or a combination of both. As a result, the Aerodyne could be steered and flown in the entire range between hovering and full-forward flight. For forward flight, the Aerodyne had a conventional tail unit at the rear, which allowed for pitch and yaw control. The Aerodyne itself was unmanned and operated by remote control.

It was intended to be a land- or ship-supported drone (UAV) that would perform aerial reconnaissance missions.

== Specifications ==
- Length: 5.5 metres (18 ft)
- Width: 1.9 metres (6 ft 3 in)
- Fan Diameter: 1.1 metres (3 ft 7 in)
- Engine: 1 MTU 6022 A-3, 370 shaft horsepower (280 kW)
- Total Weight: 435 kilograms (959 lb)

== Bibliography ==
- "Eine Dokumentation zur Geschichte des Hauses Dornier", Ed. Dornier GmbH, 1983, bound, 214 pp.
- Patents US2918230; US2918233.
