= RRG Fafnir =

German single-seat glider, 1930

Fafnir
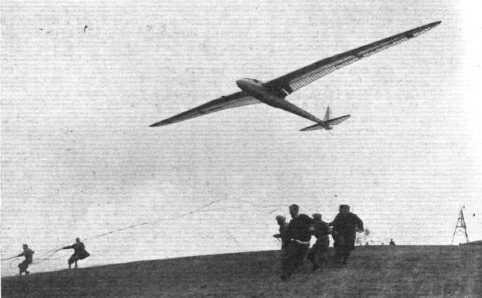

General information
- Type: High performance glider
- National origin: Germany
- Manufacturer: Rhön-Rossitten Gesellschaft (RRG)
- Designer: Alexander Lippisch
- Number built: 1

History
- First flight: July–August 1930
- Developed into: RRG Fafnir 2

The RRG Fafnir, named after the legendary dragon, was a single seat German high performance glider designed by Alexander Lippisch. It won the Rhön competition in 1931 and made several outstanding flights as well as setting a fashion for gull wings.

== Design and development ==
Lippisch began the design of the influential Fafnir in 1929. Its refined design proved difficult to construct and the aircraft was only just ready for flight tests at the start of the 1930 Rhön competition on the Wasserkuppe.

The Fafnir was not the first glider with a cantilever wing, for the Darmstadt Konsul had been built seven years earlier but a cantilever wing with an aspect ratio of almost 20 was exceptional. The single wing spar had to be deep for strength and Lippisch accommodated this by using the Göttingen 652 airfoil which is thick and strongly cambered, additionally providing lift at low speeds. The wing root was faired into the upper fuselage.

The wing was straight tapered in plan to elliptical tips and the profile changed along the span through the less cambered, more widely used Göttingen 535 to the familiar Clarke Y profile with washout at the tips to prevent tip stalling. It was plywood covered ahead of the spar, with fabric covering aft. Laterally stabilising dihedral was not common on gliders in 1929, but Lippisch applied it to about 40% of the inner span on the Fafnir, producing a gull wing. Many later gliders followed this form, though it is harder to build and has no solid aerodynamic justification. The trailing edges of the outer part of the wing carried broad and constant chord ailerons.

The Fafnir's fuselage was oval in cross-section, carefully streamlined with a ply skin and becoming slender behind the wing. The cockpit was just ahead of the wing and originally enclosed in a ply covered faring with only two side apertures for vision. Later this fairing was replaced with a stepped and fully glazed canopy. All the tail surfaces were fabric covered: an all-moving tapered elevator with an unswept leading edge was mounted on the fuselage mid-line below a small, straight edged fin which carried a large, rounded rudder mounted at the keel and moving in a shallow elevator cut-out. Launching accidents showed this exposed low mounting to be a dangerous weakness. A skid, running from the nose to under the wing trailing edge acted as an undercarriage.

== Operational history ==
The Fafnir had only just begun test flights at the start of the Rhön competition held in August 1930, when wing root turbulence was found to reduce performance. After this was rapidly reduced by the addition of shaped balsa blocks at the cockpit-leading edge junction the glider, piloted by Günther Groenhoff, had some success, sharing a new record out and return flight of 30 km (19 mi) with Robert Kronfeld.

Despite several launching accidents in the Alps early in the new year, 1931 was a successful period for Groenhoff and the Fafnir. He made the first glider flight of over 200 km (120 mi), flying 272 km (169 mi) from Munich to Kaaden in May after a tow launch. Because of the tow launch this was not officially recognised but a bungee launched, 220 km (140 mi) flight, made between the Wasserkuppe and Magdeburg in late August did set a new record. Groenhoff was overall winner at the 1931 Rhön competition. He was killed in the Fafnir at the 1932 Rhön in another rudder related launching accident.

Repaired and with a lengthened and glazed cockpit, the Fafnir was flown on some notable flights in 1933, including one of over 228 km (142 mi) from Darmstadt to France and others above Berlin. In 1934, it was taken to South America and flown for over seven hours over Buenos Aires. On return, it continued to fly from its Darmstadt home until retired to a Berlin museum, where it was destroyed by bombing in World War II.

== Specifications ==
Data from Simons (2006)

General characteristics

- Crew: One
- Length: 7.76 m (25 ft 6 in)
- Wingspan: 19.00 m (62 ft 4 in)
- Wing area: 18.6 m^{2} (200 sq ft)
- Aspect ratio: 19.4
- Airfoil: Root: Göttingen 652; mid-span Göttingen 635; tip Clarke Y
- Empty weight: 225 kg (496 lb)
- Gross weight: 315 kg (694 lb)

Performance

- Wing loading: 16.9 kg/m^{2} (3.5 lb/sq ft)

== See also ==
Related lists

- List of gliders
