= Heini Dittmar =

German aircraft designer and pilot

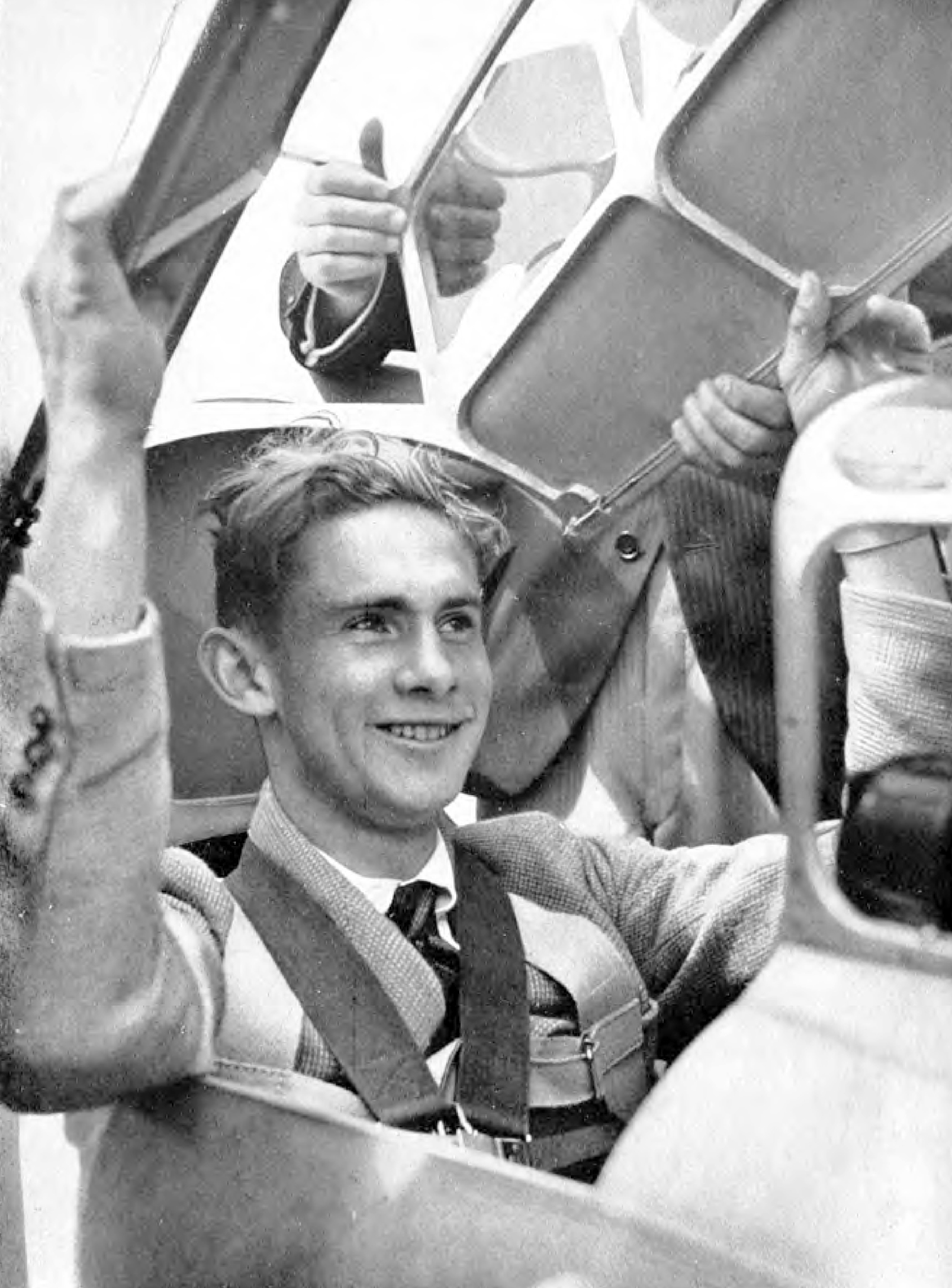
Heini Dittmar in the cockpit of possibly his La Falda or Condor glider.

Heini Dittmar (March 30, 1912 in Bad Kissingen – April 28, 1960 near Mülheim an der Ruhr, West Germany) was a record-breaking German glider pilot.

Inspired by the example of his glider flying brother Edgar, Dittmar took an apprenticeship at the German Institute for Gliding (DFS). In 1932, flying his self-built glider Condor I, he won a first prize at the Rhön Glider Competition.

Dittmar then became a research pilot. In 1934, he, Hanna Reitsch, Peter Riedel, and Wolf Hirth were members of Professor Georgii's South American Glider Expedition, where in Argentina he achieved a new world gliding altitude record (about 4,350 metres (14,270 ft)). Later the same year, he achieved a new world record for long-distance using a Fafnir II and was awarded the Hindenburg Cup. In 1936, he achieved the first crossing of the Alps in a glider. He then crowned his career as a glider pilot by becoming the first Gliding World Champion after his victory at the first Rhön International Gliding Competition in 1937.

During and after the Second World War, Dittmar worked as an aircraft designer and test pilot. On 2 October 1941, flying the Messerschmitt Me 163A V4 KE+SW, he became the first human to fly faster than 1,000 km/h (620 mph). This record was achieved over the FAI-specified 3-km distance and was measured using an Askania theodolite. Later, on 6 July 1944, he reached a speed of 1,130 km/h (700 mph) in the Me 163B V18 bearing the Stammkennzeichen code of VA+SP, nearly losing the complete rudder surface in the process to flutter. It is unclear, however, if sufficient altitude was attained to make this a true supersonic flight.

Dittmar died in a crash in 1960 while test-flying a light aircraft of his own design, the HD-153 Motor-Möwe, near Essen/Mülheim airport.
