= Alexander Lippisch =

German-American aeronautical engineer, a pioneer of aerodynamics

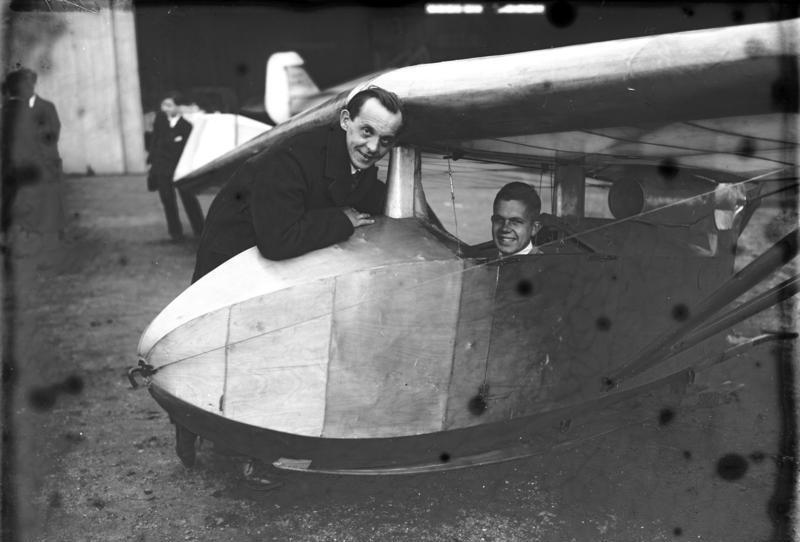
- Alexander Lippisch, with Günther Grönhoff in the cockpit of the Storch V.
- Born: November 2, 1894; Munich, German Empire
- Died: 11 February 1976 (aged 81); Cedar Rapids, Iowa, US
- Engineering career
- Projects: Messerschmitt Me 163
- Significant advance: first rocket plane first delta wing to fly first mass-produced rocket fighter

Alexander Martin Lippisch (2 November 1894 – 11 February 1976) was a German-American aeronautical engineer, a pioneer of aerodynamics who made important contributions to the understanding of tailless aircraft, delta wings and the ground effect, and also worked in the U.S. Within the Opel-RAK program, he was the designer of the world's first rocket-powered glider.

He developed and conceptualized delta wing designs which functioned practically in supersonic delta wing fighter aircraft as well as in hang gliders. People he worked with continued the development of the delta wing and supersonic flight concepts over the 20th century. His most famous designs are the Messerschmitt Me 163 rocket-powered interceptor and the Dornier Aerodyne.

== Early life ==
Lippisch was born in Munich, Kingdom of Bavaria. He later recalled that his interest in aviation began with a demonstration conducted by Orville Wright over Tempelhof Field in Berlin in September 1909. Nonetheless, he planned to follow his father's footsteps into art school, until the outbreak of World War I intervened. During his service with the German Army, between 1915 and 1918, Lippisch had the chance to fly being an aerial photographer and mapper.

== Early aircraft designs ==
Following the war, Lippisch worked with the Zeppelin Company, and it was at this time that he first became interested in tailless aircraft. In 1921, his first design to be built, by his friend Gottlob Espenlaub, was the Espenlaub E-2 glider. This was the beginning of a research programme that would result in some fifty designs throughout the 1920s and 1930s. Lippisch's growing reputation saw him appointed in 1925 to director of the Rhön-Rossitten Gesellschaft (RRG), a glider organisation including research groups and construction facilities.

Lippisch also designed conventional gliders at this time, including the Wien of 1927 and its successor the Fafnir of 1930. In 1928, partaking in the Opel-RAK program by Fritz von Opel and Max Valier, Lippisch's tail-first Ente (Duck) was equipped with powder rockets by Friedrich Wilhelm Sander's company and became the first aircraft to fly under rocket power. From 1927, he resumed his tailless work, leading to a series of designs named Storch I – Storch IX (Stork I-IX), mostly gliders. These designs attracted little interest from the government and private industry.

== Delta wing designs ==
Experience with the Storch series led Lippisch to develop what he called his Delta designs. Like the Storch series, these were mostly tailless aircraft. They included the earliest successful delta wing designs. In 1931 the Delta I glider became the first to fly. It was followed by the Delta II and III.

The Delta IV design was powered, and built in two variants as the Fieseler F3 Wespe. Lippisch subsequently designated these the Delta IVa and b, with the c being built as the DFS 39. The development of this led directly to the Messerschmitt Me 163 Komet (see next section), which Lippisch has also referred to as the Delta IVd.

The Delta V, built as the DFS 40 was a blended wing body design for comparison with the DFS 39.

In 1933, the RGG was reorganised into the Deutsche Forschungsanstalt für Segelflug (German Institute for Sailplane Flight, DFS) and the Delta IVd and Delta V were designated as the DFS 39 and DFS 40 respectively. Lippisch thus saw five designs built, numbered Delta I to V, between 1931 and 1939.

Subsequently, while at Messerschmitt, he began work on a Delta VI design. It became attached to various Messerschmitt projects, and a prototype was under construction when it was destroyed in a bombing raid.

== World War II projects ==
In early 1939, the Reichsluftfahrtsministerium (RLM, Reich Aviation Ministry) transferred Lippisch and his team to work at the Messerschmitt factory in Augsburg, in order to design a high-speed fighter aircraft around the rocket engines then under development by Hellmuth Walter. The team quickly adapted their most recent design, the DFS 194, to rocket power, the first example successfully flying in early 1940. This successfully demonstrated the technology for what would become the Messerschmitt Me 163 Komet.

Although technically novel, the Komet did not prove to be a successful weapon and friction between Lippisch and Messerschmitt was frequent. In 1943, Lippisch transferred to Vienna's Aeronautical Research Institute (Luftfahrtforschungsanstalt Wien, LFW) in Wiener Neustadt, in an own design bureau to concentrate on the problems of high-speed flight. That same year, he was awarded a doctoral degree in engineering by the University of Heidelberg. With him came the mathematician Hermann Behrbohm on half time (and continued half time for Messerschmitt in Oberammergau to where the development activities were moved into the underground facility after the 25 February 1944 air raids on Augsburg).

Wind tunnel research in 1939 had suggested that the delta wing was a good choice for supersonic flight, and Lippisch set to work designing a supersonic, ramjet-powered fighter, the Lippisch P.13a. By the time the war ended, however, the project had only advanced as far as a development glider, the DM-1.

=== Importance for the delta wing and supersonic flight concepts ===
Even though the Lippisch P.13a never flew, it and Lippisch's research and development had a significant importance for the development of the delta wing and supersonic flight concepts and supersonic delta wing fighter aircraft. Lippisch's delta wing concept proved to be very steady and efficient in very high speed supersonic flight.

This 1950s government-funded development (like that enabled by the Swedish Defence Act of 1958) was intended for swift attack of strategic nuclear weapons bombers such as the Tupolev Tu-16 before they reached their targets.

The research of the Messerschmitt and Lippisch offices were continued by:

- Hermann Behrbohm worked for the BEE (French Aerodynamic Research and Development Institute) from 1946 on with operations in Emmendingen and Weil am Rhein in the French occupation zone in Germany. His research was used in the later French development of the Dassault Mirage.
- Hermann Behrbohm worked for Saab, Linköping, Sweden from 1951 on, where he made significant contributions to the Saab 35 Draken and Saab 37 Viggen supersonic-delta wing-fighter aircraft, developing the delta wing and supersonic flight concepts. Bertil Dillner worked on the concepts with Behrbohm at Saab.
- Bertil Dillner immigrated to the US in 1967 and started working for Boeing Commercial Airplanes in Seattle at the supersonic Boeing 2707 SST passenger jet in 1967-1972 and the aerodynamics of hypersonic aviation at the re-entry of the Space Shuttle. Dillner was chief aerodynamic engineer at Boeing Commercial Airplanes from 1972 to 1981. Dillner became aerodynamic chief engineer 1981-1985 for Boeing Defense, Space & Security in Seattle and chief engineer 1985-1988 until his retirement.

== Postwar work in the United States ==
Like many German scientists, Lippisch was taken to the United States after the war under Operation Paperclip. He worked at the White Sands Missile Range.

=== Ground effect aircraft ===
From 1950 to 1964, Lippisch worked for the Collins Radio Company in Cedar Rapids, Iowa, which had an aeronautical division. It was during this time that his interest shifted toward ground effect craft. The result was an aerofoil boat research seaplane X-112, flown in 1963. However, Lippisch contracted cancer, and resigned from Collins.

When he recovered in 1966, he formed his own research company, Lippisch Research Corporation, and attracted the interest of the West German government. Prototypes for both the aerodyne and the ground-effect craft RFB X-113 (1970) then RFB X-114 (1977) were built, but no further development was undertaken. The Kiekhaefer Mercury company was also interested in his ground-effect craft and successfully tested one of his designs as the Aeroskimmer, but also eventually lost interest.

=== Aerodyne ===
Lippisch conceived of a VTOL craft which he called an "aerodyne". Its fuselage comprised a large ducted rotor, and the thrust could be varied between downwards for vertical takeoff and landing, and backwards for forward flight. He worked principally with two companies in its development.

The Collins Aerodyne, developed while he was there, had a horizontal-axis rotor with the efflux directed via large flaps located immediately behind it. The craft was stabilised by a long, high tail running back from above the flaps.

The Dornier Aerodyne was a smaller drone which sat vertically for takeoff and landing, and the whole craft rotated horizontally for forward flight.

Neither type got beyond the prototype stage.

== Death and legacy ==
Lippisch died in Cedar Rapids on 11 February 1976. In 1985, he was inducted into the International Air & Space Hall of Fame at the San Diego Air & Space Museum.

== Some Lippisch designs ==
- Lippisch SG-38 Zögling, 1926
- RRG Storch V, powered tailless glider, 1929
- DFS 39, tailless research aircraft
- DFS 40, tailless research aircraft
- DFS 193, experimental aircraft
- DFS 194, rocket-powered research aircraft, forerunner of Me 163
- Lippisch P.01-111, designed during 'Projekt X', which would eventually culminate in the Messerschmitt Me 163 Komet.
- Lippisch Li P.04, a tailless airplane designed as a competitor to the Messerschmitt Me 329
- Lippisch Li P.10, 1942 tailless bomber design
- Lippisch P.11, designed to compete with the Horten Ho 229
- Messerschmitt Me 163 Komet
- Lippisch P.13, 1943 push-pull bomber design
- Lippisch P.13a, a unique delta-winged, ramjet-powered interceptor.
- Lippisch P.13b, a unique airplane powered by a rotating fuel-table of lignite, owing to the fuel shortages late in World War 2 in Germany.
- Lippisch P.15, a development of the Messerschmitt Me 163 Komet.
- Lippisch P.20, a development of the P.15.
- Dornier Aerodyne, a 1972 wingless VTOL unmanned aircraft (UAV)

== See also ==
- Delta wing
- Supersonic flight
- Hermann Behrbohm
- Willy Messerschmitt
- Bertil Dillner
- German inventors and discoverers
- John Carver Meadows Frost
- Space Shuttle
