= Bob Barrows =

American aircraft designer

Robert Barrows is an American aircraft designer and engine builder of light aircraft. Best known as the designer of several Bearhawk planes, he is also a mechanical engineer, and A&P licensed aviation mechanic.

== Career ==
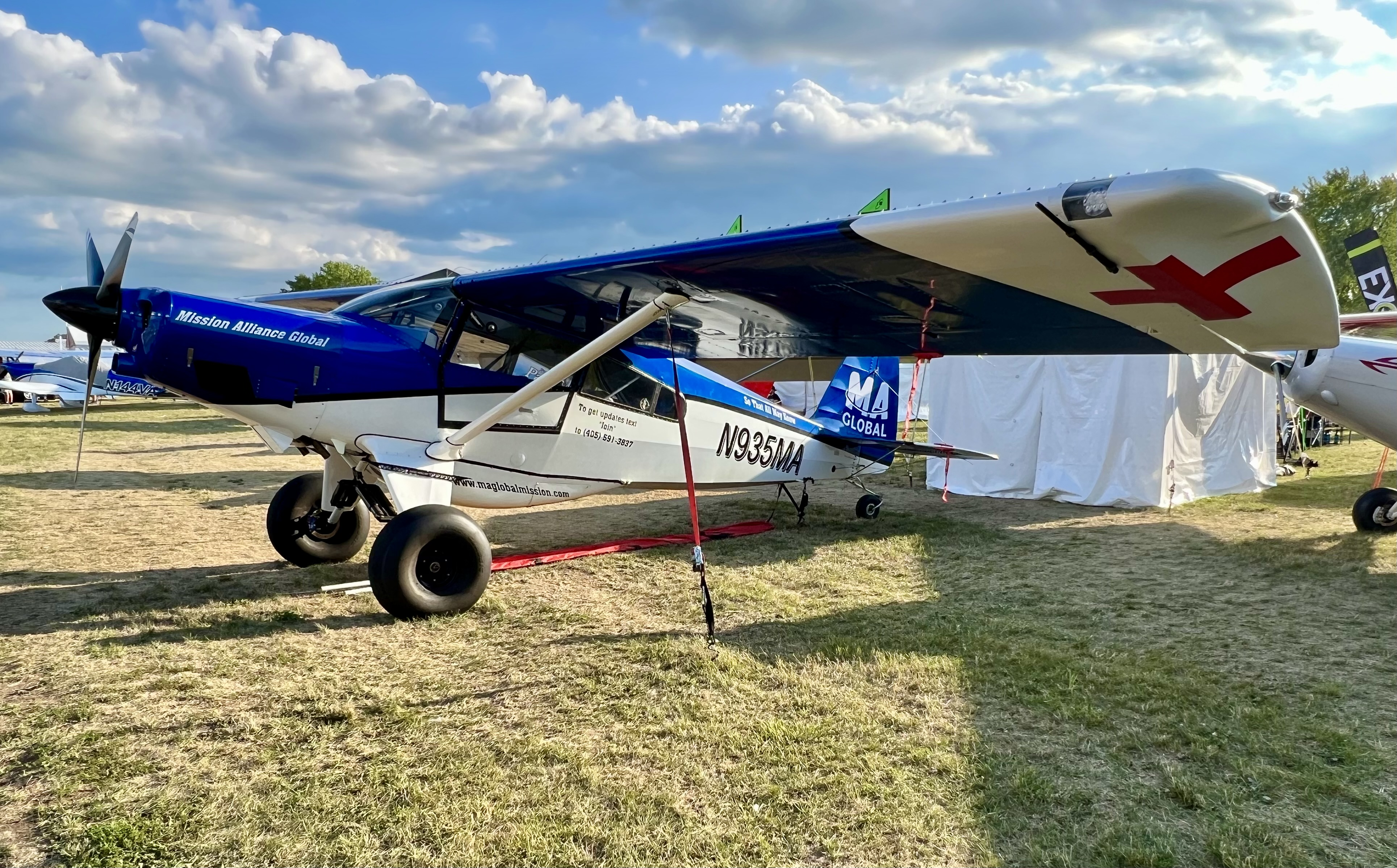
Bearhawk Model 5

Barrows is the designer of the Bearhawk Patrol, Companion, 4-Place, and Model 5 light aircraft, as well as the Bearhawk LSA light-sport aircraft.

Prior to designing the first aircraft in the Bearhawk series, the 4-Place, Barrows designed and built a STOL high wing plane called the Grasshopper and an aerobatic biplane. After designing his four-seat Bearhawk in the early 1990s, Barrows started using airfoils designed by Harry Riblett in his Bearhawk designs.

In April 2019, Barrows was injured in his Bearhawk LSA when he clipped power lines on approach to land. The LSA's steel tube design resisted crumpling beyond the firewall.
