= Barrows Bearhawk =

American homebuilt aircraft

Bearhawk
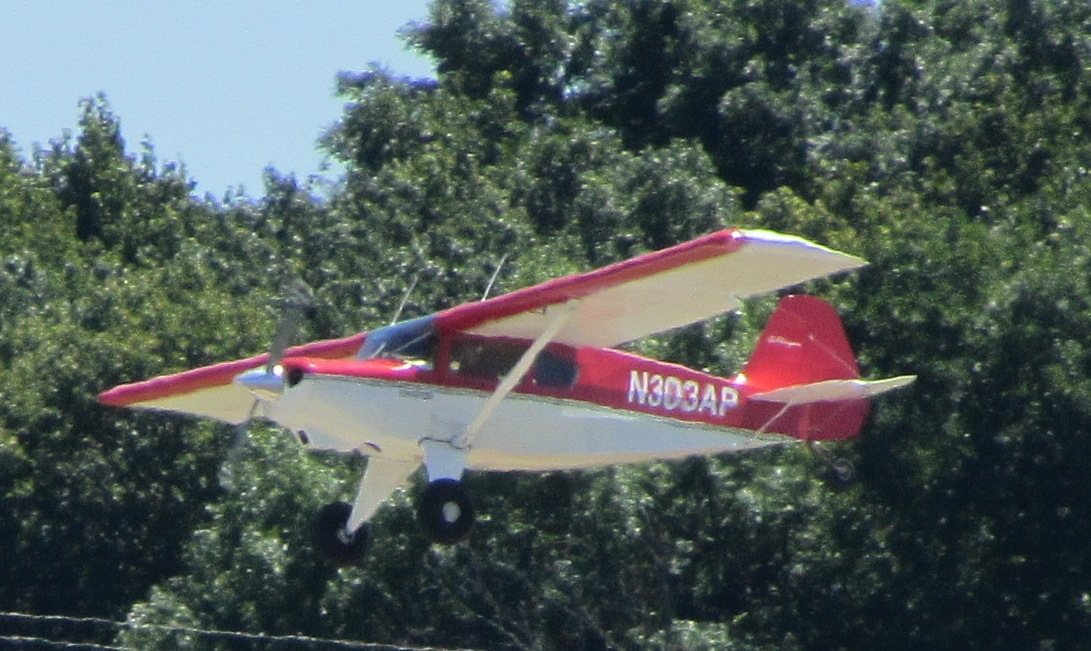

General information
- Type: Amateur-built aircraft
- National origin: United States
- Manufacturer: Bearhawk Aircraft
- Designer: Bearhawk Aircraft
- Status: In production (2017)
- Number built: 78 (Bearhawk and Patrol models)

History
- Manufactured: 2001–present
- Introduction date: mid-1990s
- Variants: Bearhawk Patrol; Bearhawk LSA; Bearhawk 5

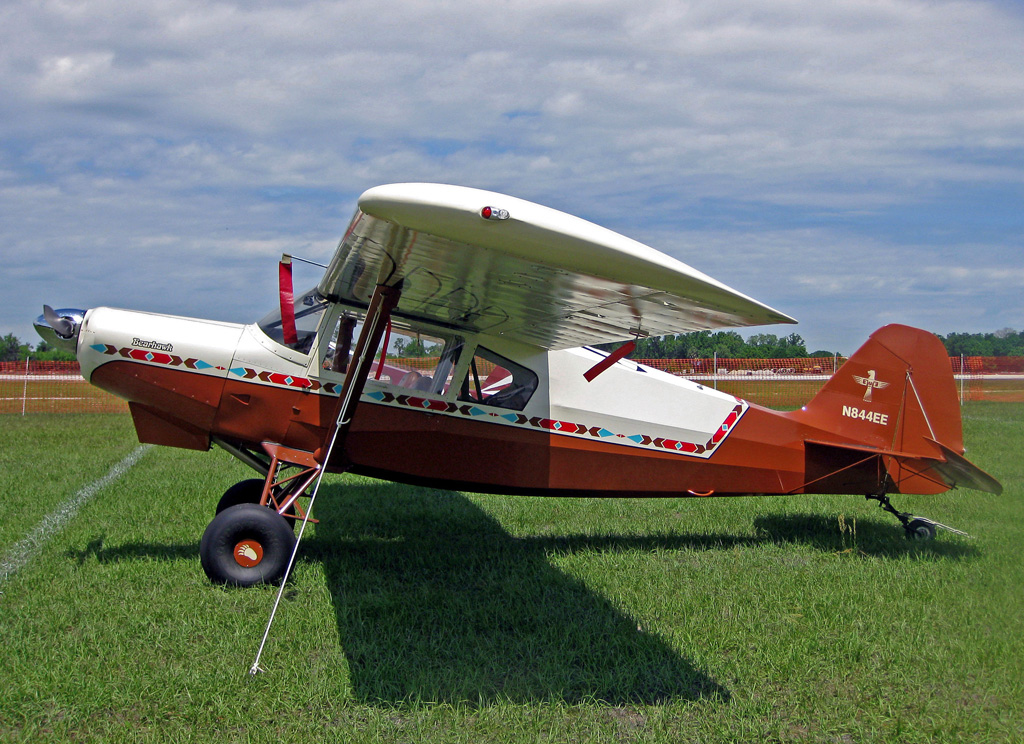
AviPro Bearhawk

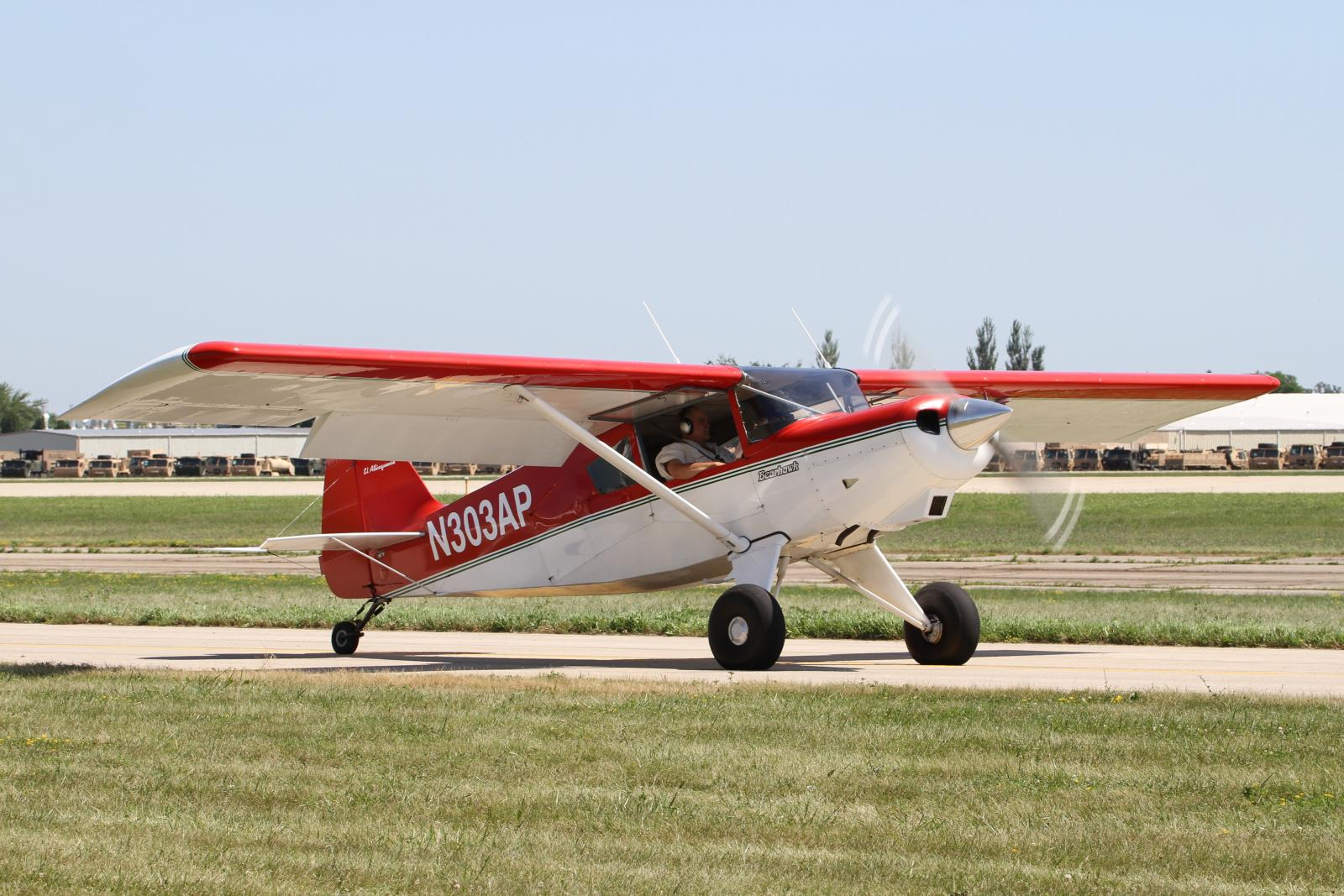
AviPro Bearhawk

The Bearhawk, is a line of light utility aircraft produced by Bearhawk Aircraft of Fairview, Oklahoma. The aircraft is supplied as a kit or as plans for amateur construction.

== Design and development ==
The Bearhawk was designed in the early 1990s as a personal project by Barrows to carry aircraft engines for delivery as freight. It features a strut-braced high-wing, a four-seat enclosed cabin that is 42.5 in (108 cm) wide and accessed by doors, fixed conventional landing gear and a single engine in tractor configuration.

The aircraft fuselage is made from welded steel tubing covered in doped aircraft fabric, while the wings are made from aluminum sheet. Its 33 ft (10.1 m) span wing employs a NACA 4412 mod airfoil, has an area of 180 sq ft (17 m^{2}) and mounts flaps. The aircraft's recommended engine power range is 150 to 260 hp (112 to 194 kW) and standard engines used include the 180 hp (134 kW) Lycoming O-360 and 250 hp (186 kW) Lycoming O-540 four-stroke powerplants. Construction time from the supplied kit is 1200 hours.

The prototype was fitted with a 170 hp (127 kW) Lycoming O-360 burning automotive fuel, but in August 2023, the option of fitting the DeltaHawk DHK180 type certified, two-stroke 180 hp (134 kW) diesel engine was added.

== Operational history ==
By October 2016, 77 examples had been registered in the United States with the Federal Aviation Administration and 11 with Transport Canada.

== Variants ==
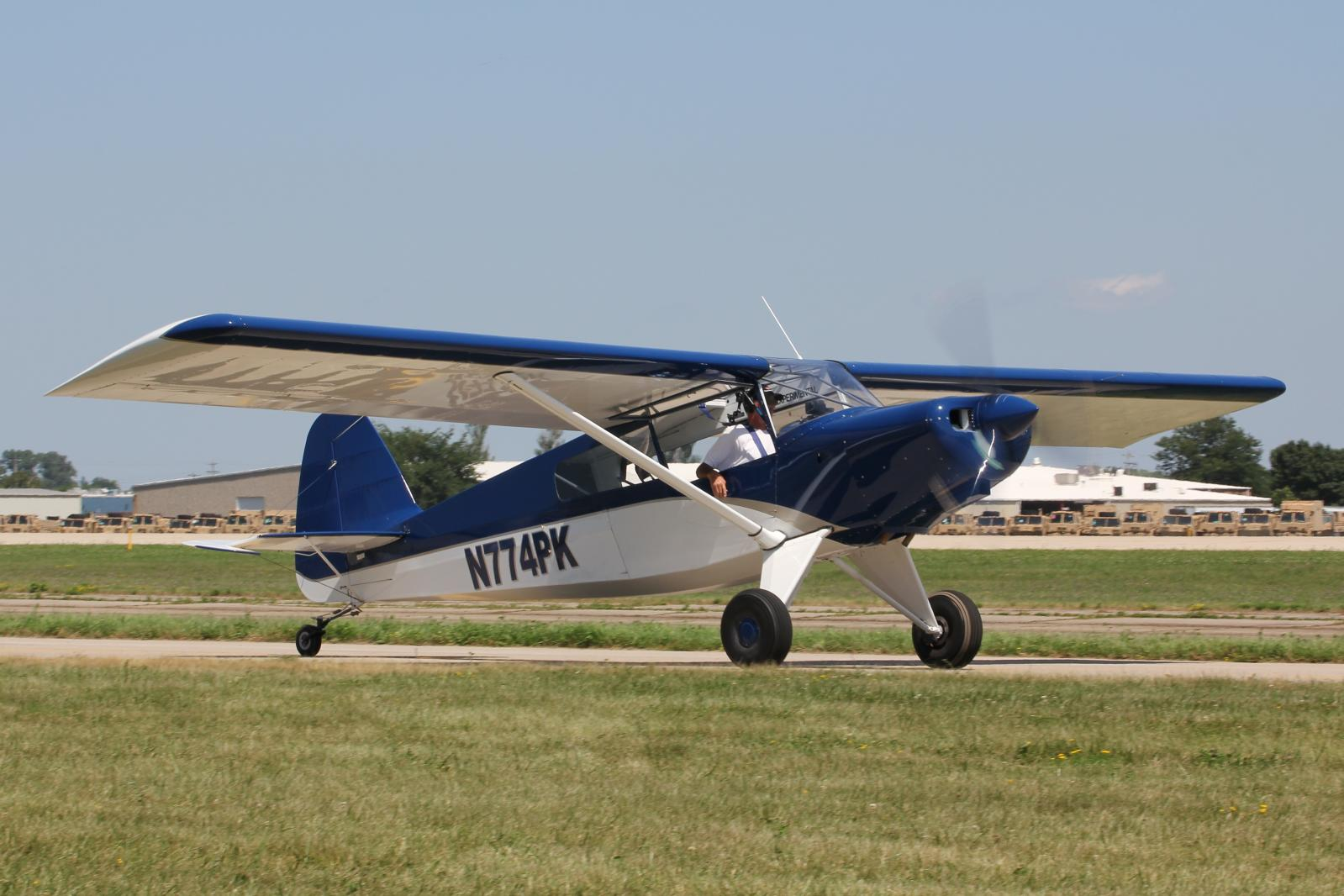
Barrows Bearhawk Patrol

Bearhawk (4-Place Bearhawk)
Four seat model with a cabin 42.5 in (108 cm) wide and a gross weight of 2,700 lb (1,225 kg), with 75 reportedly completed and flown by December 2011. Employs a NACA 4412 airfoil.
Bearhawk Bravo
Improved model introduced at AirVenture in July 2016. The wing has a 12 in (30 cm) greater span and 5 sq ft (0.46 m^{2}) greater area and employs a Riblett 30-413.5 airfoil, which gives a 5 to 8 mph (8 to 13 km/h) higher top speed while retaining a low stall speed. The redesigned airframe also uses aluminum fuselage formers, window sills and door sills, replacing the steel formers and sills in the original model, which provides better corrosion resistance and less weight. The landing gear struts are made of heavy-wall round cross section tubing rather than streamlined tubing, which provides more resistance to sideload failure.
Patrol
Two-seats in tandem model with a cabin 32 in (81 cm) wide and a gross weight of 2,000 lb (907 kg), with three reportedly completed and flown by December 2011.
Companion
Two-seats in side-by-side configuration model, with a gross weight of 2,200 lb (998 kg). First customer deliveries in October 2019.

== Specifications (Bearhawk) ==
Data from Kitplanes

General characteristics

- Crew: one
- Capacity: three passengers
- Length: 23 ft 6 in (7.16 m)
- Wingspan: 33 ft (10 m)
- Wing area: 180 sq ft (17 m^{2})
- Airfoil: NACA 4412 mod
- Empty weight: 1,400 lb (635 kg)
- Gross weight: 2,700 lb (1,225 kg)
- Fuel capacity: 50 U.S. gallons (190 L; 42 imp gal)
- Powerplant: 1 × Lycoming O-540 six cylinder, air-cooled, four stroke aircraft engine, 250 hp (190 kW)
- Propellers: 2-bladed constant speed

Performance

- Cruise speed: 155 mph (249 km/h, 135 kn)
- Stall speed: 40 mph (64 km/h, 35 kn)
- Range: 625 mi (1,006 km, 543 nmi)
- Rate of climb: 1,700 ft/min (8.6 m/s)
- Wing loading: 15 lb/sq ft (73 kg/m^{2})
