= Continental O-170 =

Aircraft engine family

A65/O-170
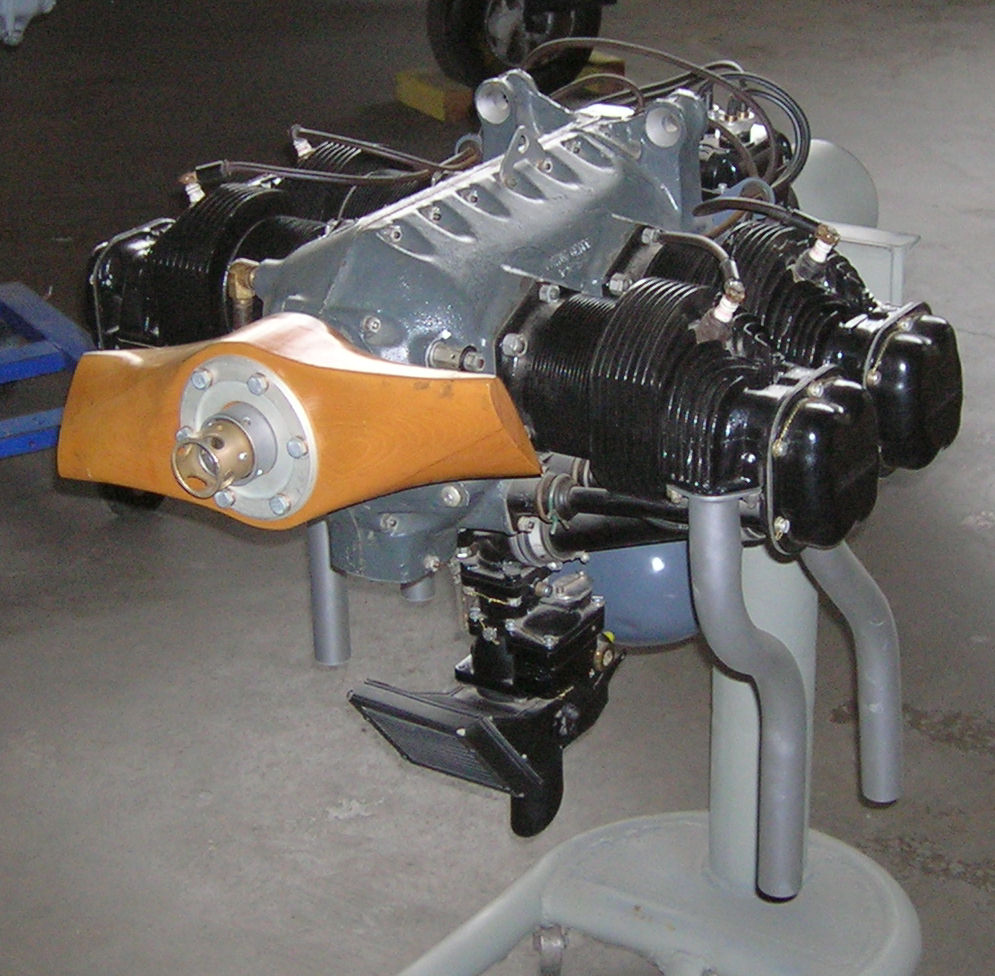
- Continental O-170 on display at the Wings Over the Rockies Air and Space Museum
- Type: Piston aero-engine
- Manufacturer: Continental Motors

The Continental O-170 engine is the collective military designation for a family of small aircraft engines, known under the company designation of A50, A65, A75 and A80. The line was designed and built by Continental Motors commencing in the 1940s. It was employed as the powerplant for civil and military light aircraft.

The horizontally opposed, four-cylinder engines in this family are all identical in appearance, bore, stroke, dry weight, and piston displacement. All feature a bottom-mounted updraft carburetor fuel delivery system. The higher power variants differ only in compression ratio and maximum allowable rpm, plus minor modifications. The lower power versions are fully convertible to the higher rated versions.

== Design and development ==
In all models of this family of engines the cylinder heads are of aluminum alloy, screwed and shrunk onto steel barrels. Spark plug inserts and intake valve seats are made from aluminum-bronze alloy, while the exhaust valve seats are steel. The engines all employ hydraulic tappets which operate in aluminum guides that are machined into the crankcase. The tappets are built from four parts, a cam follower body, cup, cylinder, and piston and operate with clearances of 0.03 in (1 mm) to 0.11 in (3 mm). The pushrods are steel and feature pressed-in ball ends.

Lubricating oil is delivered under pressure from the 4 US qt (3.79 L) oil sump to the drive bearings and the crankpins through the crankshaft. The cylinder walls and pistons are spray lubricated. Normal operating oil pressure is 35 psi, with minimum idle oil pressure 10 psi.

== Variants ==
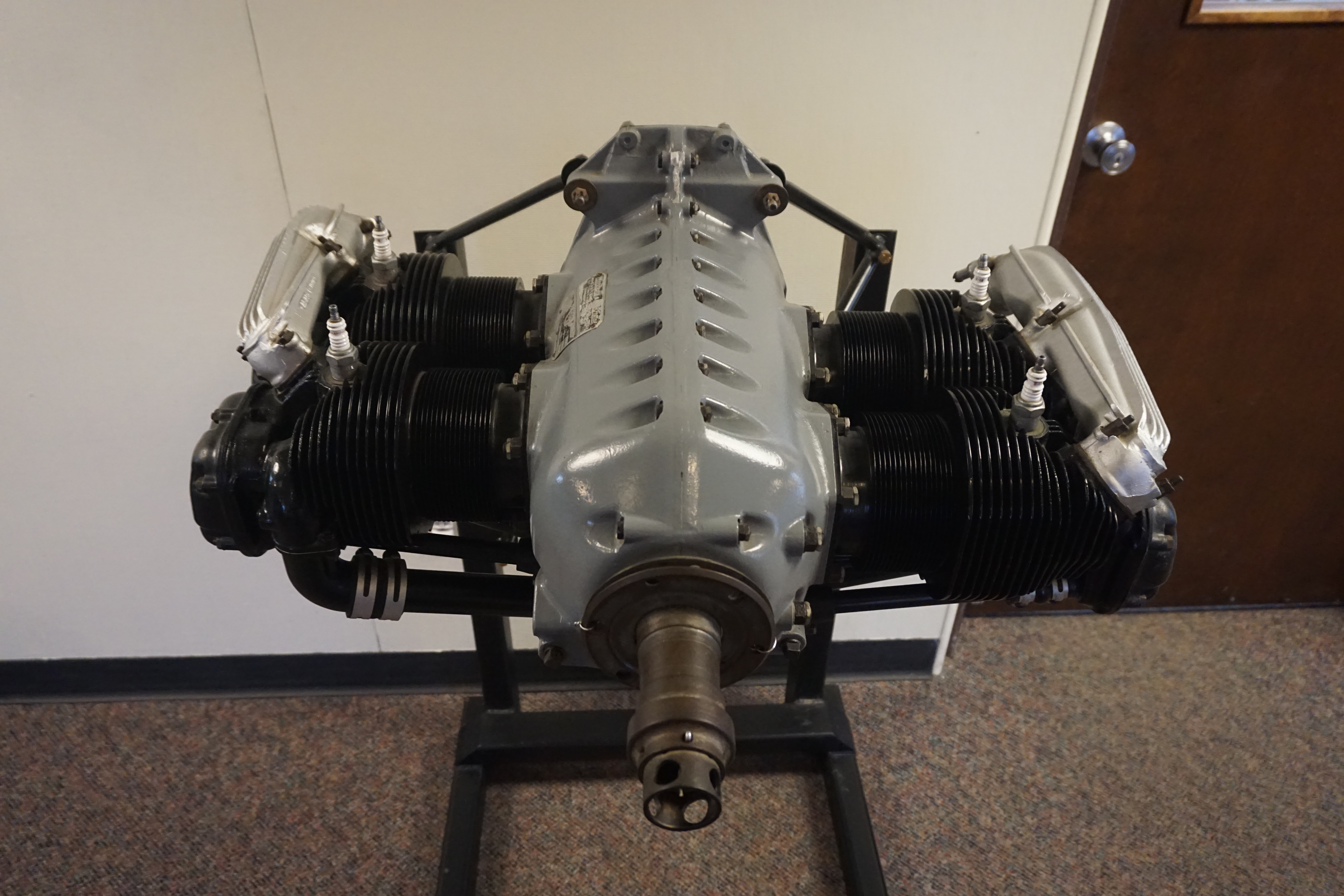
A50 on display at the Air Zoo

A50
50 hp (37 kW), Compression ratio 5.4:1, max rpm 1,900, fuel consumption at cruise 3.8 US gph
A50-1
A50-2
A50-3
A50-4
A50-5
A50-6
A50-7
A65
65 hp (48 kW), Compression ratio 6.3:1, max rpm 2,300, fuel consumption at cruise 4.4 US gph. The exhaust valves have stellite faces. The pistons have three rings, although some early production A65s had four piston rings.
A65-1
A65-2
A65-3
A65-4
A65-5
A65-6
A65-7
A65-8
A65-8F
A65-9:
A65-12
A75
75 hp (56 kW), Compression ratio 6.3:1, max rpm 2,600, fuel consumption at cruise 4.8 US gph. The exhaust valves have stellite faces and the connecting rods have a 0.125 in (3 mm) hole drilled in the rod cap to improve lubrication. The pistons have three rings and smaller piston pins.
A75-1
A75-2
A75-3
A75-4
A75-5
A75-6
A75-14
A80
80 hp (60 kW), Compression ratio 7.55:1, max rpm 2,700, fuel consumption at cruise 5.2 US gph. The connecting rods have a 0.125 in (3 mm) hole drilled in the rod cap to improve lubrication. The pistons have five rings and smaller piston pins.
A80-1
A80-2
A80-3
A80-4
A80-5
A80-6
A80-8
O-170
Military designation for the A50, A65, A75, A80 family of engines.
O-170-1
O-170-3
O-170-5
O-170-7

== Applications ==
A50

- Aeronca KCA
- Aeronca 50C
- Aeronca 50TC
- Aeronca S50C
- Luscombe 8
- Piper J-3
- Piper J-4
- Porterfield CP50
- Porterfield CP55
- Taylorcraft BC
- Taylorcraft BCS

A65

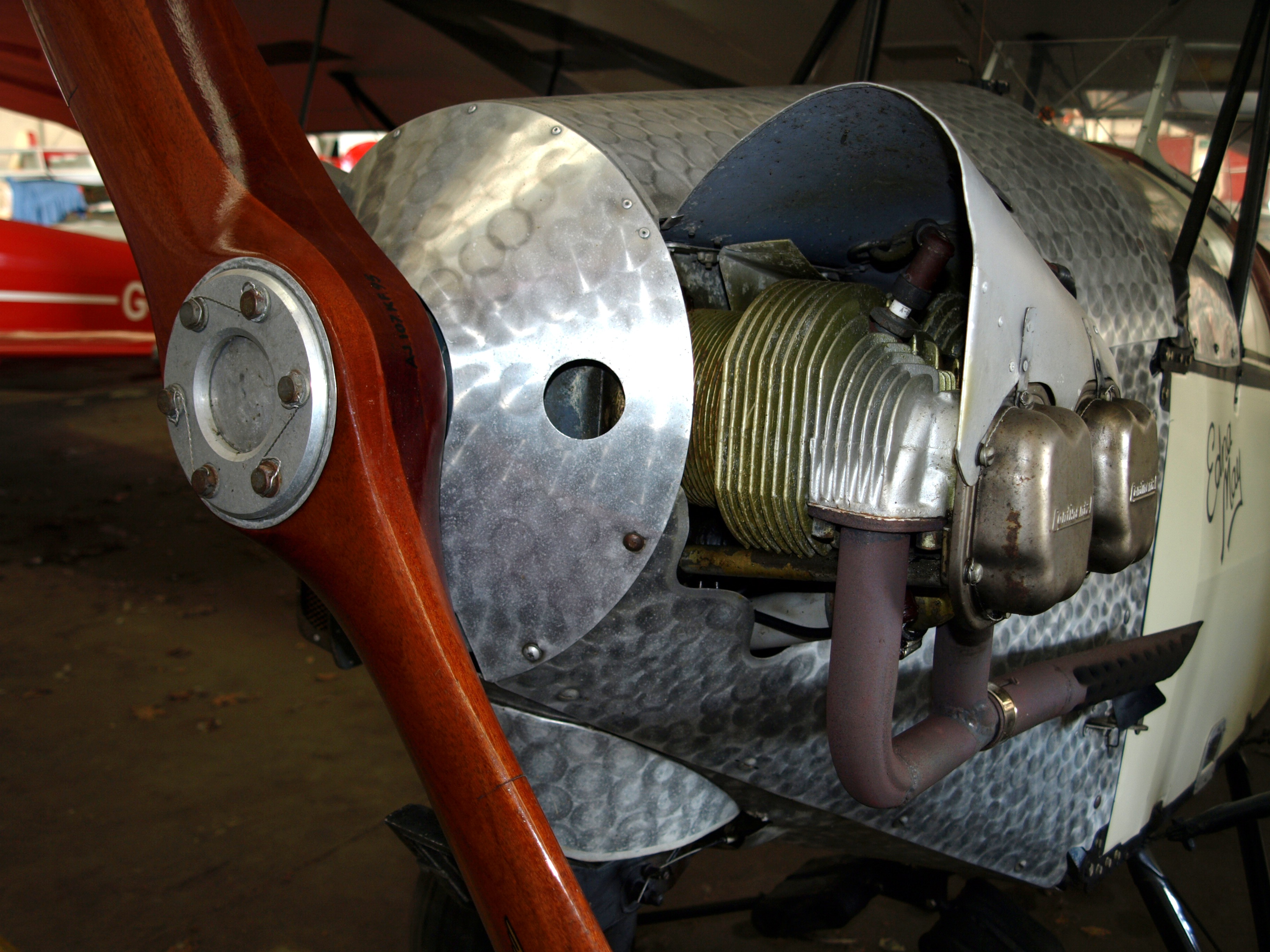
A Continental A65-8F installed in a Pietenpol Air Camper

- Aeronca L-3
- Aeronca S65C
- Aeronca S65CA
- Aeronca 65F
- Aeronca 65CA
- Aeronca Champion
- Airdrome Fokker D-VIII
- Bearhawk LSA
- Cassutt Special
- Christavia Mk I
- Circa Reproductions Nieuport
- Coupé-Aviation JC-01
- Davis DA-2
- Davis DA-5
- Ercoupe 415C
- E & P Special
- Falconar F11 Sporty
- Fisher Celebrity
- Fisher Dakota Hawk
- Helmy Aerogypt
- Henderson Little Bear
- Interstate SIA Cadet
- Jameson RJJ-1 Gipsy Hawk
- Jodel D.112
- Luscombe 8A
- Luscombe 10
- Piper J-3
- Piper J-4A
- Porterfield CP65
- Rearwin Skyranger 165
- Smith Miniplane
- Stolp SA-900 V-Star
- Taylorcraft BCS
- Taylorcraft BCS12
- Taylorcraft 65
- Tayorcraft BC
- Taylorcraft BC1265
- Taylorcraft BCT
- Taylorcraft L-2
- Taylorcraft Tandem
- Turner T-40
- Warner Revolution I
- Wolf W-11 Boredom Fighter

A75

- Bearhawk LSA
- Culver LCA
- Jodel D.121
- Luscombe 8C
- Luscombe 8D
- Piper J-4E
- Piper J-5
- Piper J-5A
- Porterfield 75C
- Rearwin Skyranger 175
- Stinson Model 105 (HW-75)

A80

- Harris Geodetic LW 108
- Piper J-5A-80
- Shirlen Big Cootie
- Stinson Model 105 (HW-80)
- Stinson Model 10
- Vought V-173

== Specifications (O-170-3 or A-65-8) ==
Data from Continental Aircraft Engine Operator's Manual

=== General characteristics ===
- Type: 4-cylinder air-cooled horizontally opposed aircraft piston engine
- Bore: 3.875 in (98 mm)
- Stroke: 3.625 in (92 mm)
- Displacement: 171 in³ (2.8 L)
- Length: 31 in (787 mm)
- Width: 31.5 in (800 mm)
- Height: 29 5/16 in (745 mm)
- Dry weight: 170 lb (77 kg)

=== Components ===
- Valvetrain: One intake and one exhaust valve per cylinder, pushrod-actuated.
- Fuel system: Updraft carburetor
- Fuel type: 80/87 octane avgas
- Oil system: Wet sump
- Cooling system: Air-cooled

=== Performance ===
- Power output: 65 hp (48 kW) at 2,300 rpm
- Specific power: 0.38 hp/in³ (17.1 kW/L)
- Compression ratio: 6.3:1
- Fuel consumption: 4.4 US gal/hr
- Oil consumption: maximum desirable 0.37 US quarts/hr
- Power-to-weight ratio: 0.38 hp/lb (0.62 kW/kg)

== See also ==
Comparable engines

- Lycoming O-145

Related lists

- List of aircraft engines
