= Porterfield Collegiate =

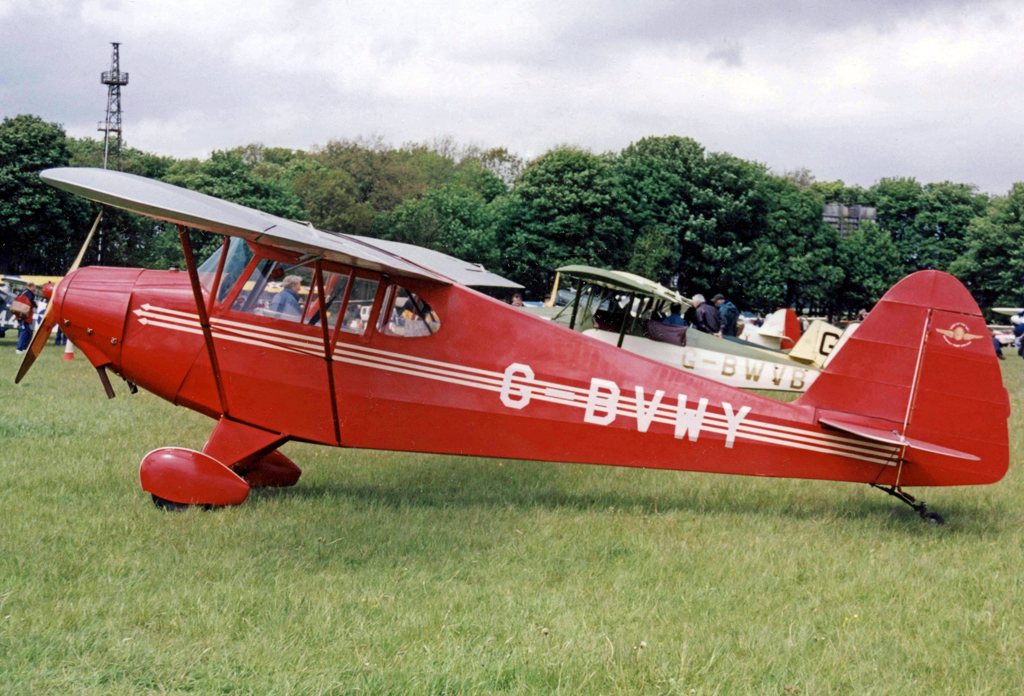
- CP-65 at a rally at RAF Kemble in 2003

General information
- Type: Two-seat trainer
- Manufacturer: Porterfield Aircraft Corporation
- Status: still in service
- Primary user: private pilot owners and aero clubs
- Number built: 476

History
- Manufactured: 1936-1941
- Introduction date: 1936
- First flight: 1936

The Porterfield Collegiate is an American-built two-seat training and touring monoplane built by the Porterfield Aircraft Corporation of Kansas City.

== Design ==
Developed originally as the Porterfield Zephyr, under Approved Type Certificate (ATC) 2-530, it is a light-weight version of the earlier Model 35 Flyabout for use as a pilot trainer. Powered by a 40 hp (30 kW) Continental A-40 engine it was later re-designated the Porterfield CP-40.

Though roughly in the same general class with the tandem-seat Piper Cub, Aeronca Champ, and Interstate Cadet -- and the side-by-side seating Aeronca Chief, Taylorcraft BC-12D and Luscombe 8 -- the tandem-seat Porterfield is visually distinguishable from them by its twin parallel wing struts on each side (compared to the V-shaped struts on the other planes), and by its largely symmetrical airfoil wing (similar curvature top and bottom).

== Development ==
To improve performance, under ATC 690, the engine was replaced with a 50 hp (47 kW) Continental A50-4 engine and re-designated the CP-50 Collegiate. It is a braced high-wing monoplane with a tail skid fixed landing gear. The two bracing struts run in parallel from the bottom of the fuselage and the tailplane was fixed to the top of the rear fuselage. Due to the narrowness of the fuselage, particularly to the rear of the cabin, the type is nicknamed "Skinny Bird".

In 1940, under ATC 720, the power was again upped to the popular 65-horsepower Continental A-65, pushing cruise to 100 mph, with a 500-pound useful load permitting a 300-statute-mile range.

A number of variants were produced with different engine installations, resulting in a series of model designations.

Roughly concurrently with the development of the Continental-powered CP-series, Porterfield also developed variants (under the same ATCs) to accommodate comparable Lycoming engines (LP-50, LP-55 and LP-65 -- over 400 built, in all) and the less-popular Franklin engines (FP-60 and FP-65).

== Production and operations ==
Total production had reached 476 when production ceased in 1942 at the start of American involvement in the Second World War. Many used in the U.S. Civilian Pilot Training Program to prepare civilians to become military aviators for the emerging threat of war.

Over 100 Porterfields remained active with private pilot owners in the United States and other countries in 2001.

In 2014 two Collegiates were active in Europe, G-AFZL a 1939 CP-65 in U.K and F-AYRJ (ex-G-BVWY) a 1940 CP-65 in France. Others airworthy outside the United States include examples in Canada, Mexico and Argentina. An owners club exists to support the ongoing operation of the type, of which around 40 of all varieties are active.

== Variants ==
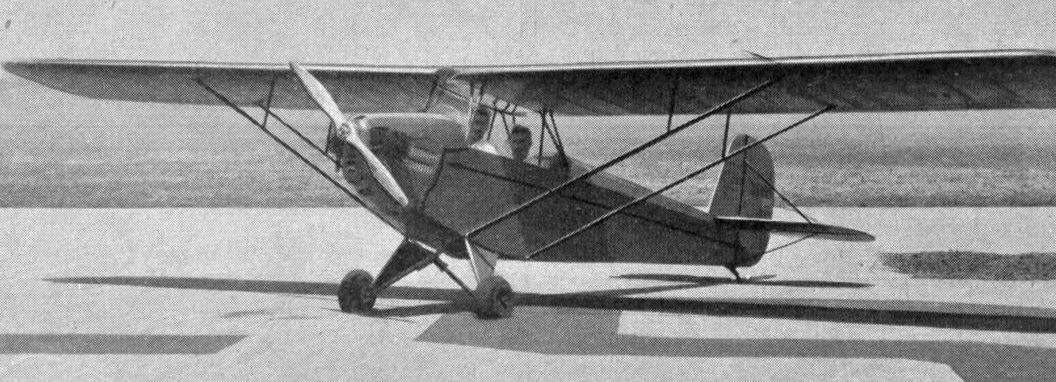
Porterfield Zephyr 70 photo from Le Pontentiel Aérien Mondial 1936

CP-40 Zephyr
Original 40 hp (30 kW) Continental A40 powered version
CP-50
Improved production variant with a 50hp (47kW) Continental A50-4 engine
CP-55
Revised engine cowling
CP-65
Powered by a 65hp (48kW) Continental A65-8 or -9 engine.
FP-60
Powered by a 60hp (45kW) Franklin 4AC-171-A1 engine.
FP-65
Powered by a 65hp (48kW) Franklin 4AC-176-B29 engine.
LP-50
Powered by a 50hp (37kW) Lycoming O-145-A1 engine.
LP-55
Powered by a 55hp (41kW) Lycoming O-145-A3 engine.
LP-65
Powered by a 65hp (48kW) Lycoming O-145-B1 or B2 engine.

== Specifications (CP-65) ==
Data from The Illustrated Encyclopedia of Aircraft (Part Work 1982-1985), 1985, Orbis Publishing, Page 2760 and Simpson, 2001, p.442.

General characteristics

- Crew: 2
- Length: 22 ft 8 in (6.91 m)
- Wingspan: 34 ft 9 in (10.59 m)
- Height: 6 ft 11 in (2.11 m)
- Wing area: 168.80 sq ft (15.68 m^{2})
- Empty weight: 671 lb (304 kg)
- Gross weight: 1,160 lb (526 kg)
- Powerplant: 1 × Continental A65-8/9 flat-four piston engine , 65 hp (48 kW)

Performance

- Maximum speed: 108 mph (174 km/h, 94 kn)
- Cruise speed: 98 mph (158 km/h, 85 kn)
- Range: 300 mi (483 km, 260 nmi)
- Service ceiling: 15,000 ft (4,570 m)
- Rate of climb: 600 ft/min (3.0 m/s)

== Gallery ==
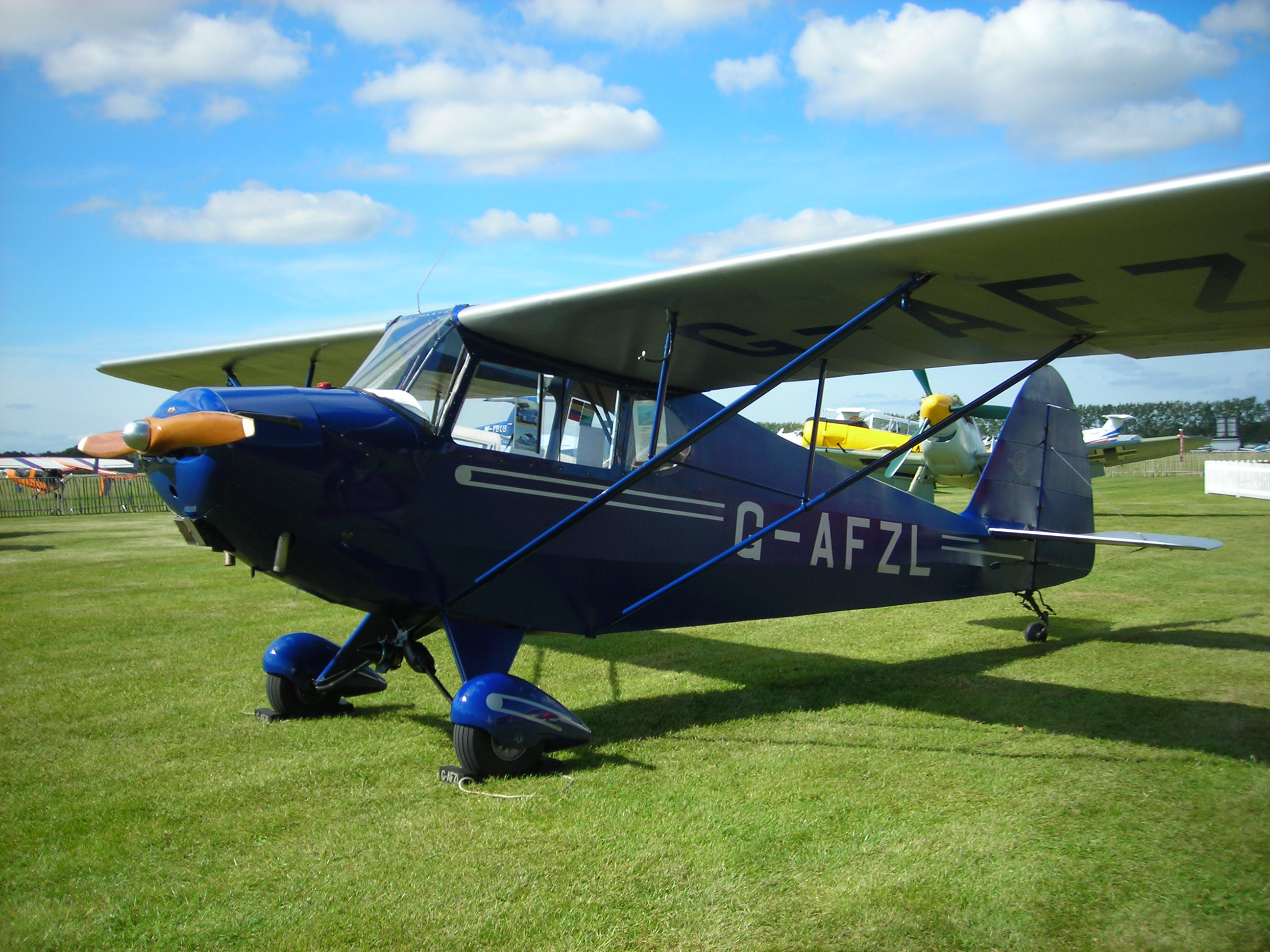

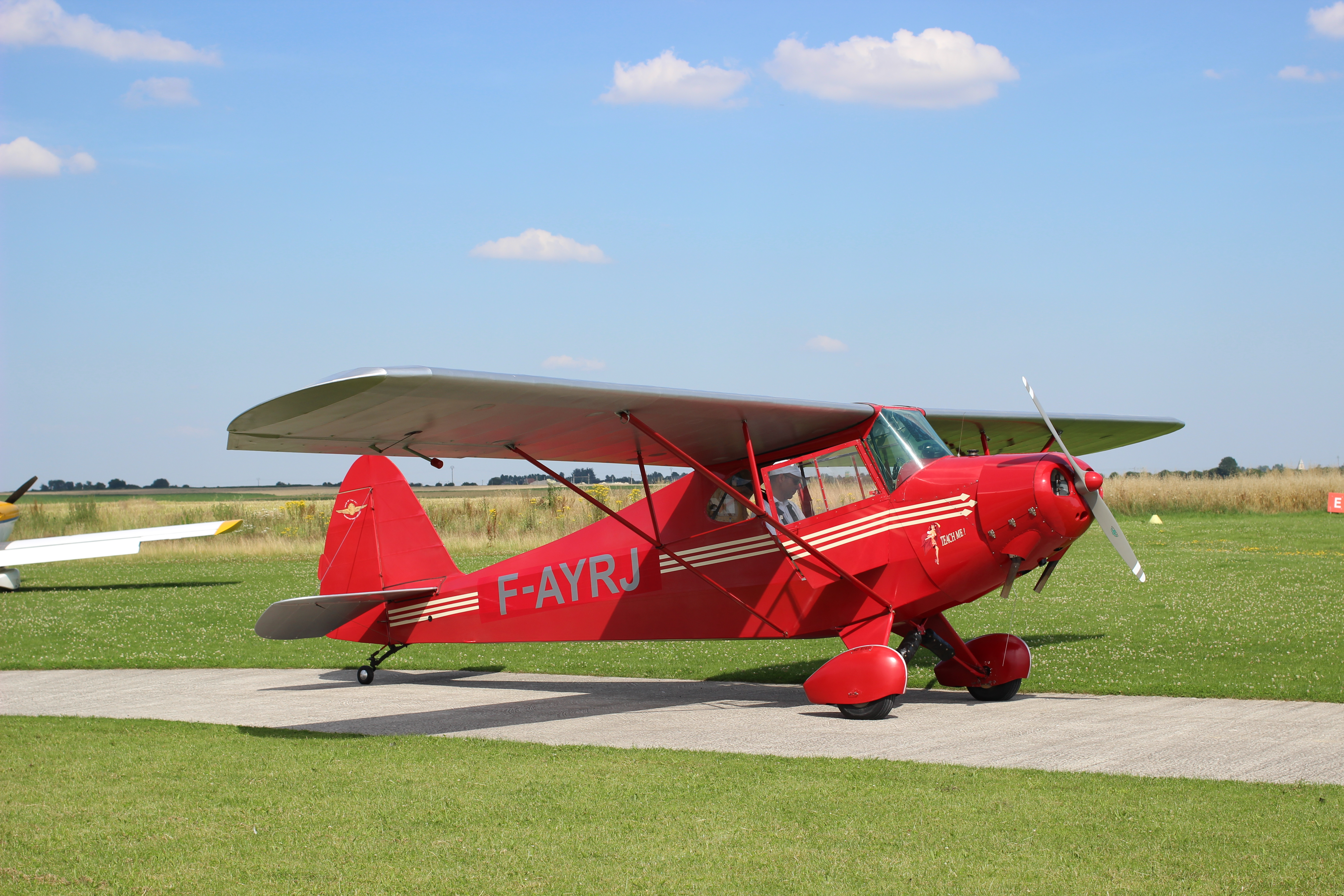

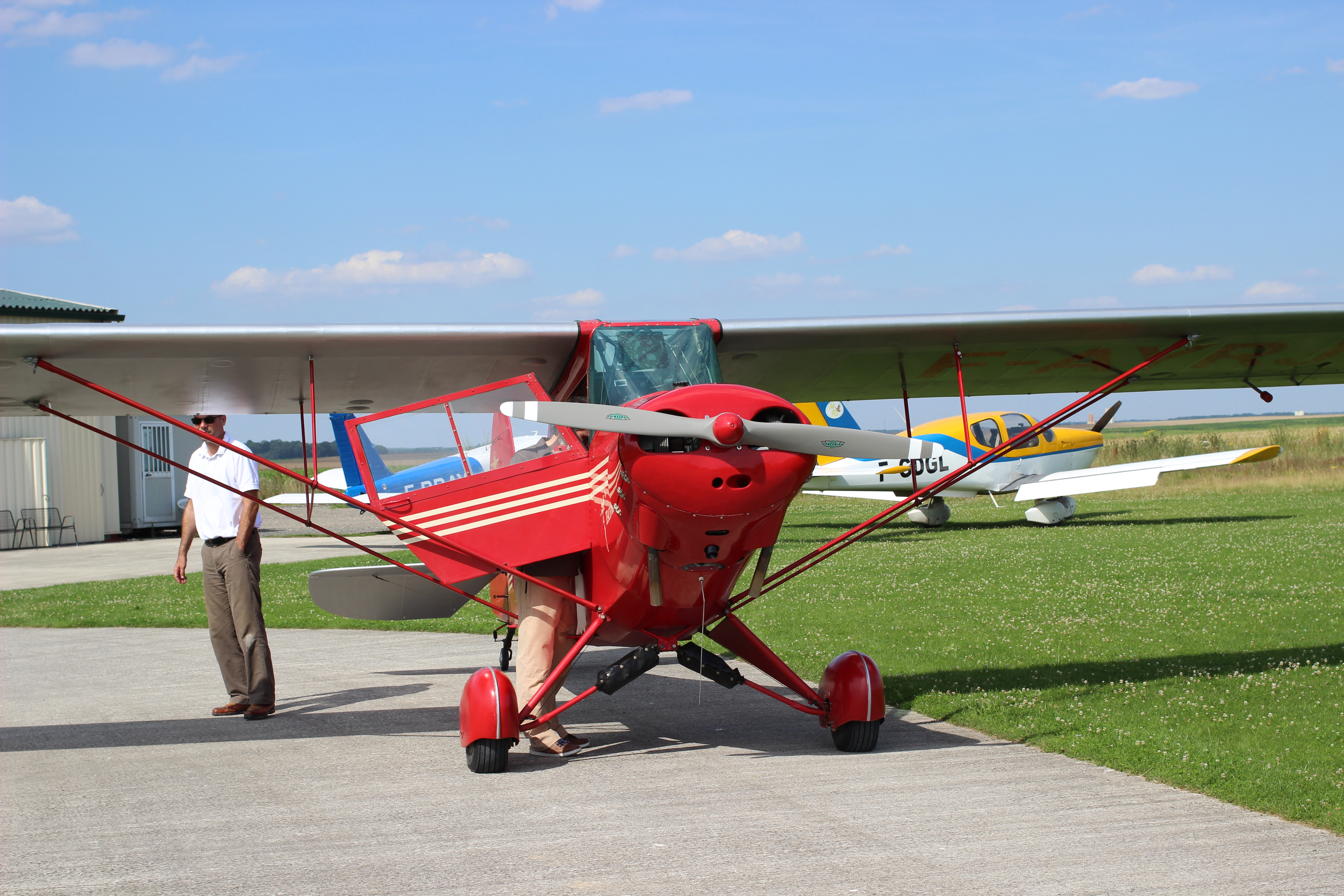

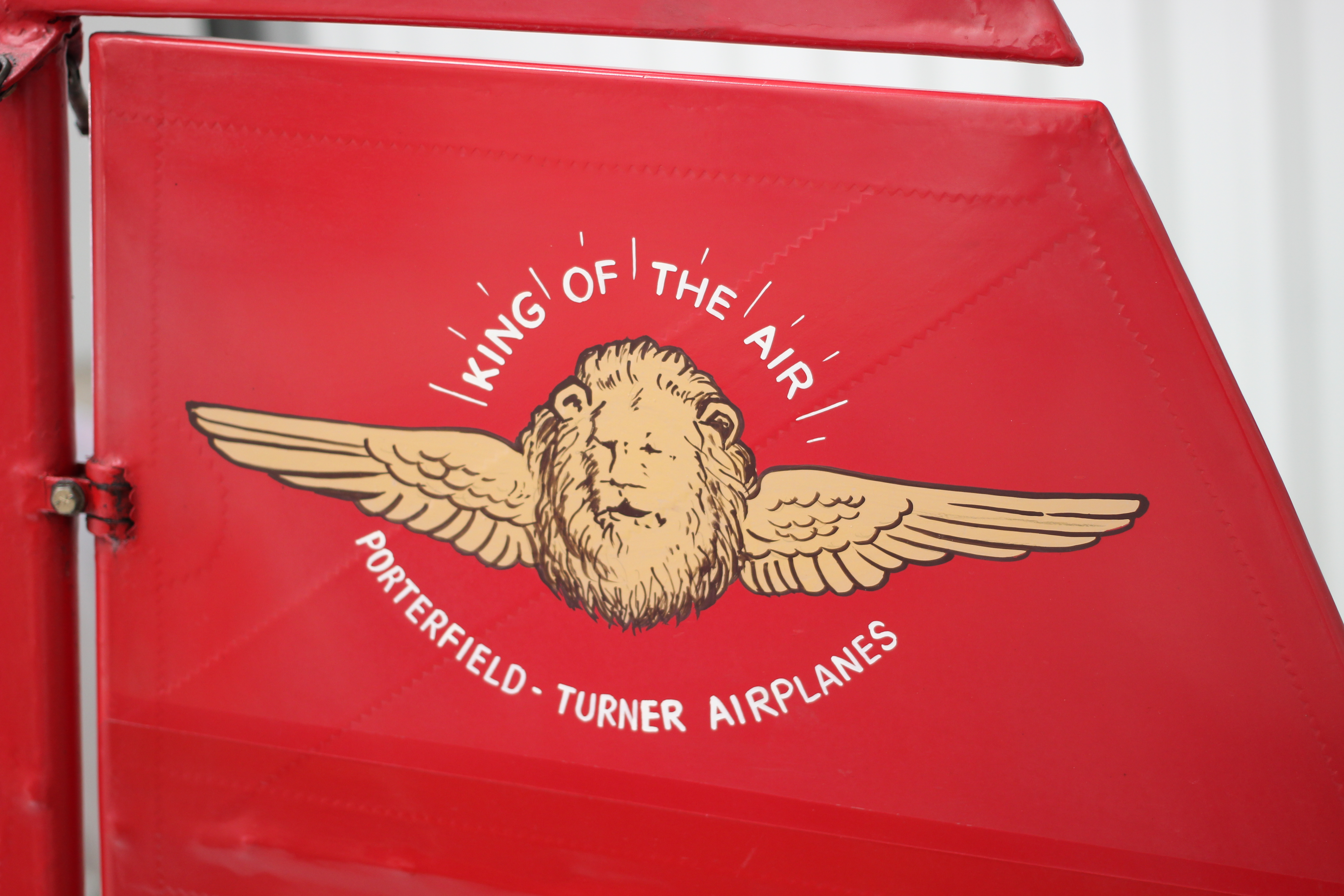

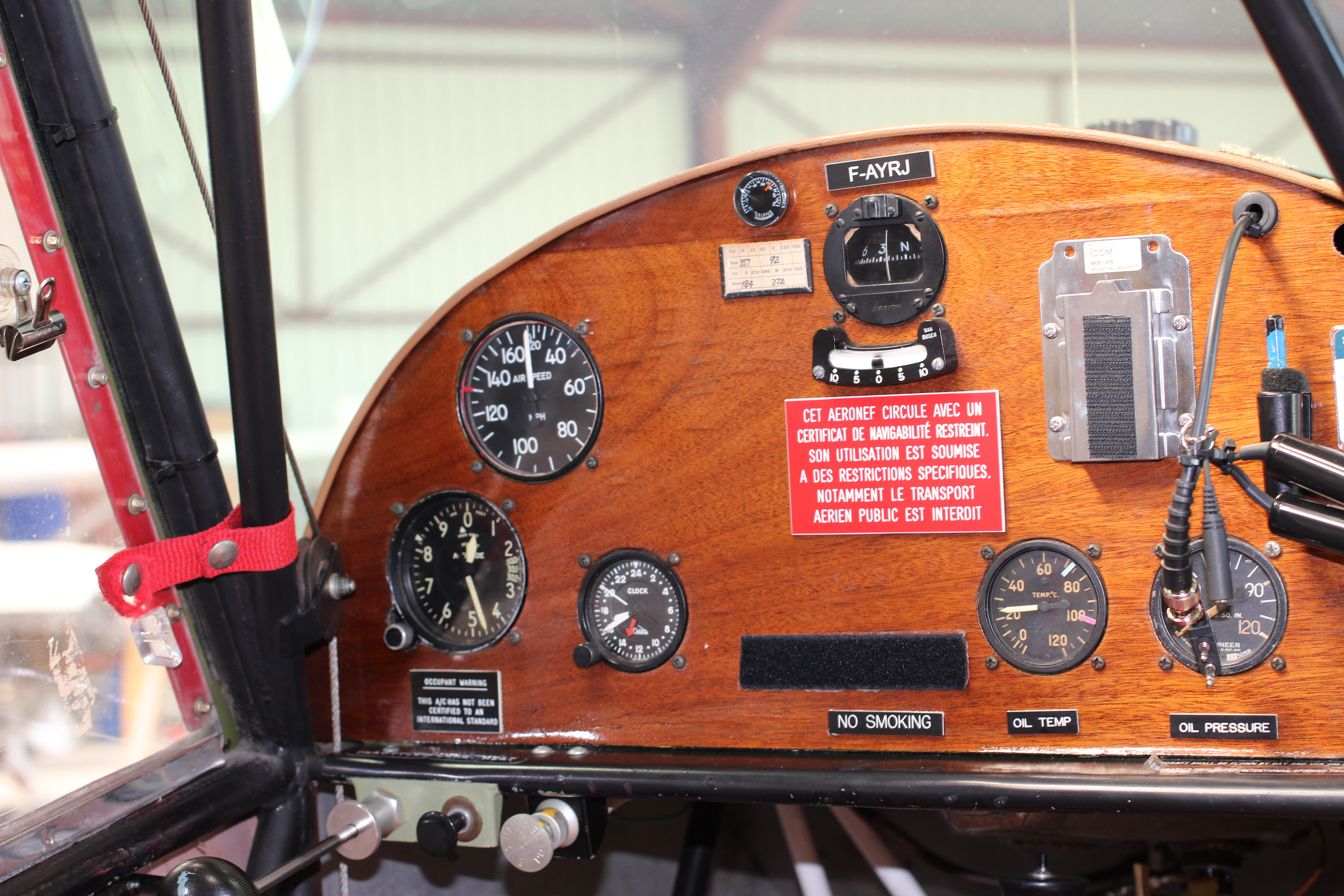

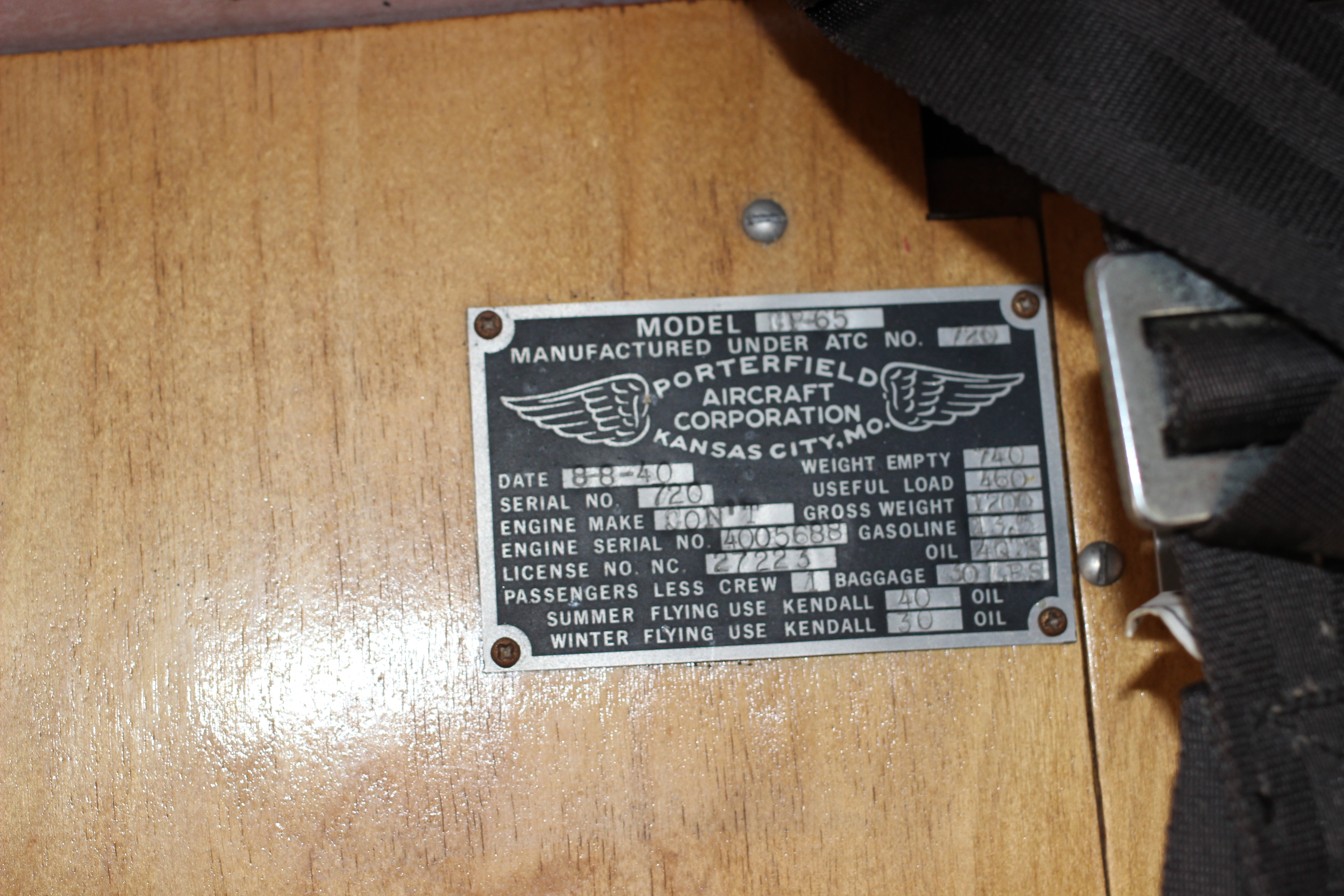
