= Piper J-4 =

1930s aircraft

J-4 Cub Coupe
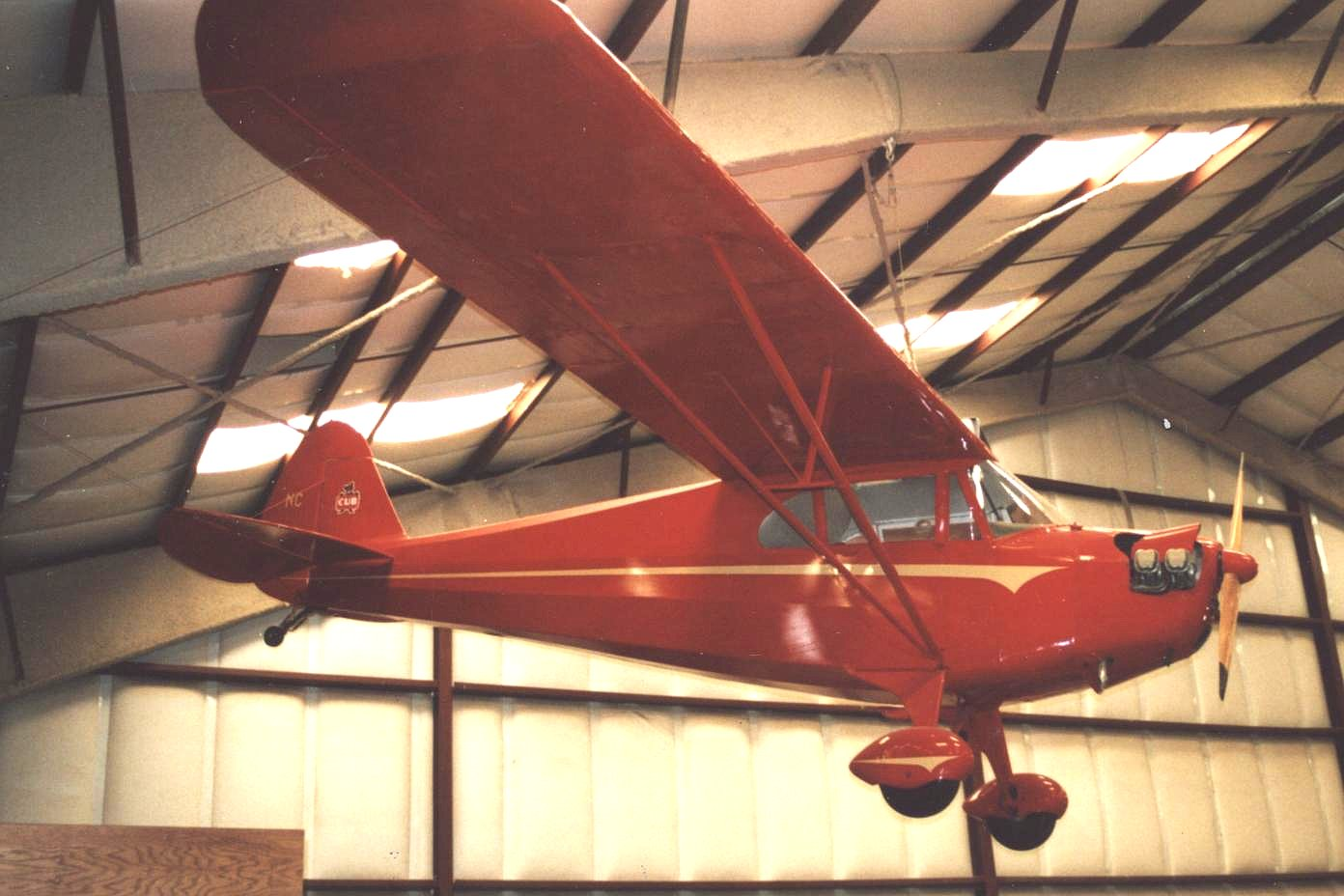
- Piper J-4A Cub Coupe displayed at the Pima Air Museum, Tucson, Arizona in 2005

General information
- Type: Trainer and private owner aircraft
- Manufacturer: Piper
- Status: Many still flying as of 2026
- Number built: 1,251

History
- Manufactured: 1938-1942
- Introduction date: 1938
- First flight: May 1938

The Piper J-4 Cub Coupe is a two place side-by-side version of the Piper J-3 that was built between 1938 and 1942 by Piper Aircraft. It was Piper's first model with side-by-side seating.

== Development ==
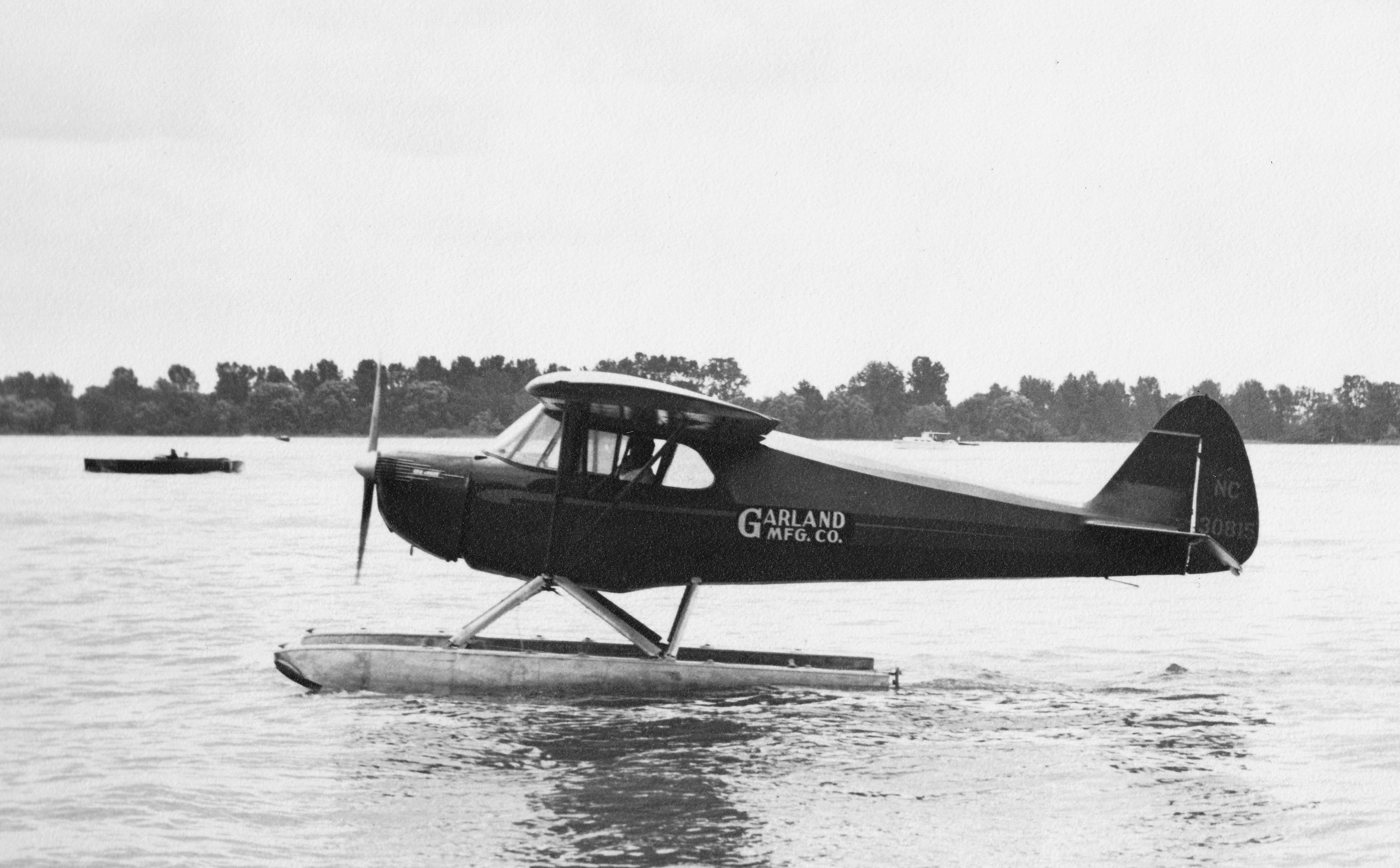
Piper J-4A Cub Seaplane (owned by Garland Manufacturing Company) on the Detroit River in 1946.

The fuselage of the J-4 was wider than the J-3 and the aircraft had a fully enclosed rear decking to the fuselage top. The first J-4s had a Continental 50 hp A50 engine with upward-facing exhaust ports, an open cowl, oil and spring landing gear, a modified tail wheel system and many other changes. The early J-4 had a comfortable cockpit but was slower than most side by side aircraft of the day.

The 1940 J-4A gained a fully enclosed cowling, a Continental 65 hp A65 engine, and aft auxiliary fuel. The J-4B was fitted with a 60 hp Franklin 4AC-171 engine. The final version was the 1941 J-4E which sported a 75 hp Continental engine and redesigned interior. The main fuel tank was moved to the wing along with a header tank. Performance was now on par with similar contemporary types, but the attack on Pearl Harbor sealed its fate as all civilian aircraft manufacture came to a stop with the entry of the United States into World War II.

Some J-4s had another unique feature in the tail construction: the stabilizer was made of stainless steel tubing, riveted together with gussets.

== Variants ==
J-4
powered by a 50-hp (37-kW) Continental A50-1 piston engine.
J-4A
powered by a 65-hp (48-kW) Continental A65-1 or -8 piston engine.
J-4B
powered by a 60-hp (45-kW) Franklin 4AC-171 or 65-hp (48-kW) 4AC-176-B2 piston engine.
J-4E
powered by a 75-hp (56-kW) Continental A75-9 piston engine.
J-4F
powered by a 55-hp (41-kW) Avco Lycoming O-145-A1, -A2 or 65-hp (48-kW) O-145-B1 piston engine.
J-4RX
prototype with a "Rose Slotted Wing" and powered by a 75-hp (56-kW) Continental A75-8 engine.

== Specification (J-4A) ==
General characteristics Performance

Data from Simpson, 2001, p. 430.

General characteristics

- Length: 22 ft 6 in (6.86 m)
- Wingspan: 36 ft 2 in (11.02 m)
- Height: 6 ft 10 in (2.08 m)
- Gross weight: 1,300 lb (589.67 kg)
- Powerplant: 1 × Continental A65-1 piston engine , 65 hp (48 kW)

Performance

- Maximum speed: 100 mph (160.93 km/h, 87 kn)
- Cruise speed: 92 mph (148.06 km/h, 80 kn)
- Range: 360 mi (579.36 km, 310 nmi)
- Service ceiling: 15,000 ft (4,572 m)
- Rate of climb: 600 ft/min (3.04 m/s)

== See also ==
Related development

- Piper J-3 Cub

Aircraft of comparable role, configuration, and era

- Aeronca 50 Chief
- Cessna 120 and 140
- Ercoupe
- Luscombe 8
- Taylorcraft B

Related lists

- List of aircraft of World War II
