= Turner T-40 =

T-40

General information
- Type: Homebuilt aircraft
- National origin: United States
- Manufacturer: Turner Aircraft, Inc.
- Designer: Gene Turner
- Status: Plans available

History
- Introduction date: 1961
- First flight: 3 April 1961

The Turner T-40 also marketed as the TEDDE Turner T-40 is a wooden, single-seat, homebuilt aircraft that was designed by Eugene L. "Gene" Turner, first flying on 3 April 1961 (his birthday).

== Design and development ==
The T-40 was designed to be a simple to build, all wood aircraft with folding wings. The prototype was modified several times from a single-seat aircraft to a two-place. It also was modified with a bubble canopy and for one flight only, canard control surfaces.

The T-40 has conventional landing gear. The canopy on the original T-40 single seat version was modeled using the NACA X-2 canopy as a guide. The majority of the wood used for structural components is Douglas fir. The wing and fuselage skins are plywood. The fuel tank is made of fiberglass. For control an all flying tail is used with anti-servo tabs. The dual spar, laminar flow wings can be folded for storage.

== Operational history ==
The prototype T-40, named "Ophelia Bumps", won the 1961 EAA Outstanding Design Award, second place in the 1962 EAA Design Competition, the Lockheed-Marietta Georgia Award for Outstanding Workmanship, the EAA Outstanding Canopy Design Trophy The prototype is now on display at the Saxon Aerospace Museum in Boron, California.

== Variants ==
Turner T-40
Original version
Turner T-40A
A two seat variant with conventional landing gear.
Turner T-40B
A two seat variant with tricycle landing gear.
Super" Turner T-40AS
Bubble canopy 125hp
Turner T-77
T-40 with bubble canopy and swept tail.

== Specifications (T-40) ==
Data from Sport Aviation

General characteristics

- Crew: 1
- Length: 19 ft 5 in (5.92 m)
- Wingspan: 22 ft 3 in (6.78 m)
- Height: 5 ft 5 in (1.65 m)
- Wing area: 78 sq ft (7.2 m^{2})
- Aspect ratio: 6.35
- Airfoil: NACA 65-215
- Gross weight: 850 lb (386 kg)
- Fuel capacity: 9.5 U.S. gallons (36 L; 7.9 imp gal)
- Powerplant: 1 × Continental A65 horizontally opposed piston aircraft engine, 65 hp (48 kW)
- Propellers: 2-bladed Beech-Roby controllable-pitch propeller

Performance

- Maximum speed: 120 kn (140 mph, 230 km/h)
- Cruise speed: 110 kn (130 mph, 210 km/h)
