= Henderson Little Bear =

American homebuilt aircraft

Little Bear

General information
- Type: Homebuilt aircraft
- National origin: United States
- Manufacturer: Henderson Aero Specialties
- Status: Production completed
- Number built: Two

History
- First flight: 1993
- Developed from: Piper J-3 Cub

The Henderson Little Bear is an American homebuilt aircraft that was designed and produced by Henderson Aero Specialities of Felton, Delaware, introduced in 1993. The aircraft is a replica of the Piper J-3 Cub (a little bear is a "cub"). When it was available the aircraft was supplied as a kit or in the form of plans for amateur construction.

== Design and development ==
The Little Bear features a strut-braced high-wing, a two-seats-in-tandem enclosed cockpit accessed via doors, fixed conventional landing gear and a single engine in tractor configuration.

The aircraft fuselage is made from welded steel with all surfaces covered in doped aircraft fabric. Its 35.00 ft (10.7 m) span wing employs a USA 35B airfoil, has a wing area of 178.0 sq ft (16.54 m^{2}) and is supported by "V" struts and jury struts. The cabin width is 28 in (71 cm). The acceptable power range is 65 to 100 hp (48 to 75 kW) and the standard engine used is the 65 hp (48 kW) Continental A65.

The Little Bear has a typical empty weight of 700 lb (320 kg) and a gross weight of 1,220 lb (550 kg), giving a useful load of 520 lb (240 kg). With full fuel of 12 U.S. gallons (45 L; 10.0 imp gal) the payload for the pilot, passenger and baggage is 448 lb (203 kg).

The manufacturer estimated the construction time from the supplied kit as 400 hours.

== Operational history ==
By 1998 the company reported that five kits had been sold and two aircraft were completed and flying.

In December 2013 one example was registered in the United States with the Federal Aviation Administration.

== Specifications (Little Bear) ==
Data from AeroCrafter

General characteristics

- Crew: one
- Capacity: one passenger
- Length: 22 ft 6 in (6.86 m)
- Wingspan: 35 ft 0 in (10.67 m)
- Wing area: 178.0 sq ft (16.54 m^{2})
- Airfoil: USA 35B
- Empty weight: 700 lb (318 kg)
- Gross weight: 1,220 lb (553 kg)
- Fuel capacity: 12 U.S. gallons (45 L; 10.0 imp gal)
- Powerplant: 1 × Continental A65 four cylinder, air-cooled, four stroke aircraft engine, 65 hp (48 kW)
- Propellers: 2-bladed wooden

Performance

- Maximum speed: 122 mph (196 km/h, 106 kn)
- Stall speed: 38 mph (61 km/h, 33 kn)
- Range: 200 mi (320 km, 170 nmi)
- Service ceiling: 10,500 ft (3,200 m)
- Rate of climb: 500 ft/min (2.5 m/s)
- Wing loading: 6.9 lb/sq ft (34 kg/m^{2})
