= Powell PH Racer =

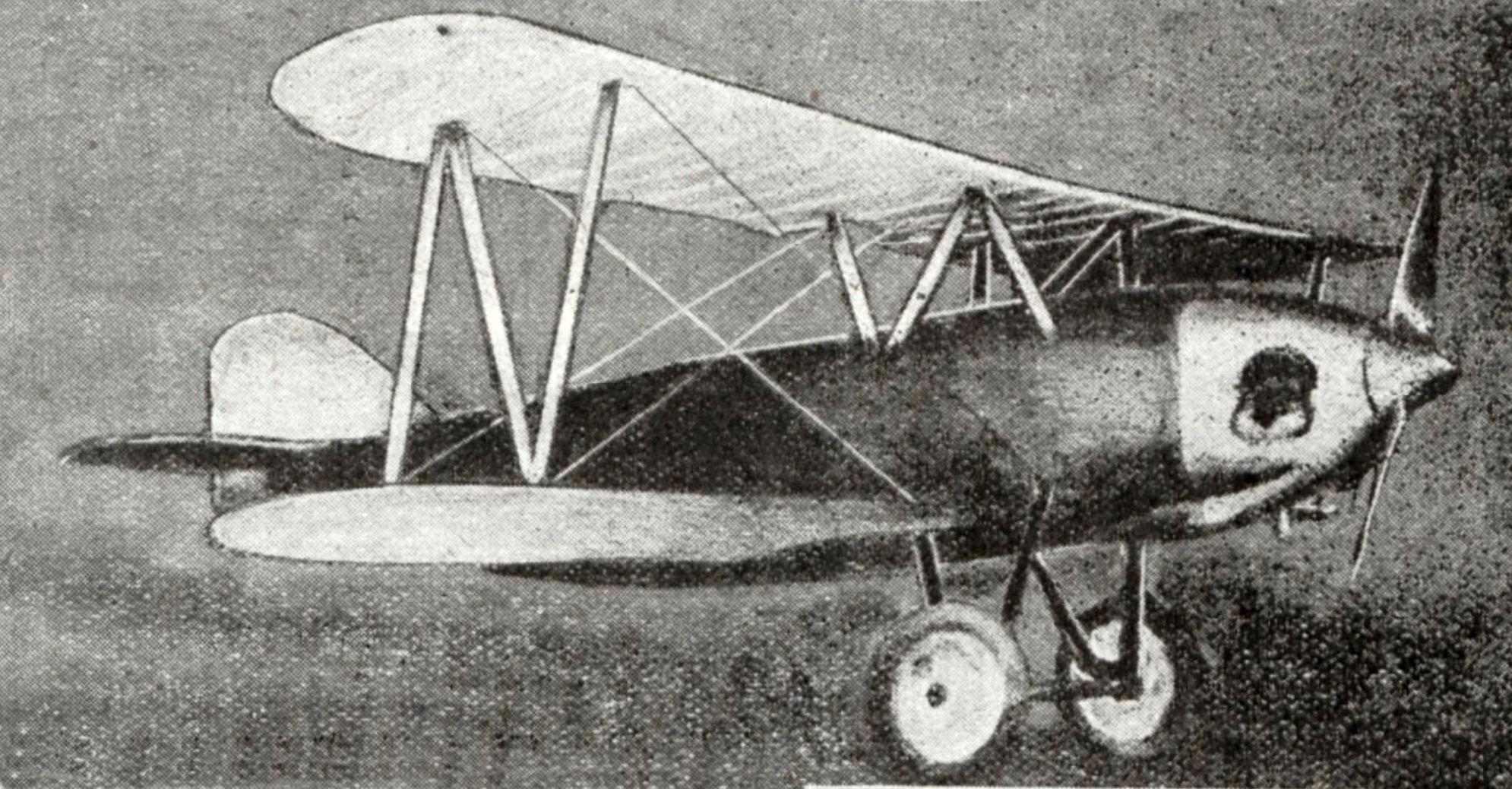

General information
- Type: Air Racer
- National origin: United States of America
- Designer: CH Powell

History
- Variant: Shirlen Big Cootie

The Powell PH Racer was a 1920s air racer which held the distinction of having won all the races it entered.

== Design and development ==
The aircraft was designed by Professor C.H. Powell, teacher at the Aeronautics Department of the University of Detroit.

The biplane racer used an all-wood fuselage with birch paneling. The wing spars were also wood with fabric covering. Uniquely, the aileron hinges were made of leather.

== Operational history ==
Race Winnings

- 1925 National Air Races piloted by Jerry V. Dack of Dayton, Ohio
- Aero Digest Trophy (Dack)
- The Dayton Daily News Trophy
- The Scientific American Trophy

The Powell Racer was returned to the University of Detroit where it was destroyed in static load tests.

== Variants ==
- Shirlen Big Cootie A set of plans were drawn up for the Powell PH Racer, using steel tubing for the fuselage.

== Specifications (Powell Racer) ==
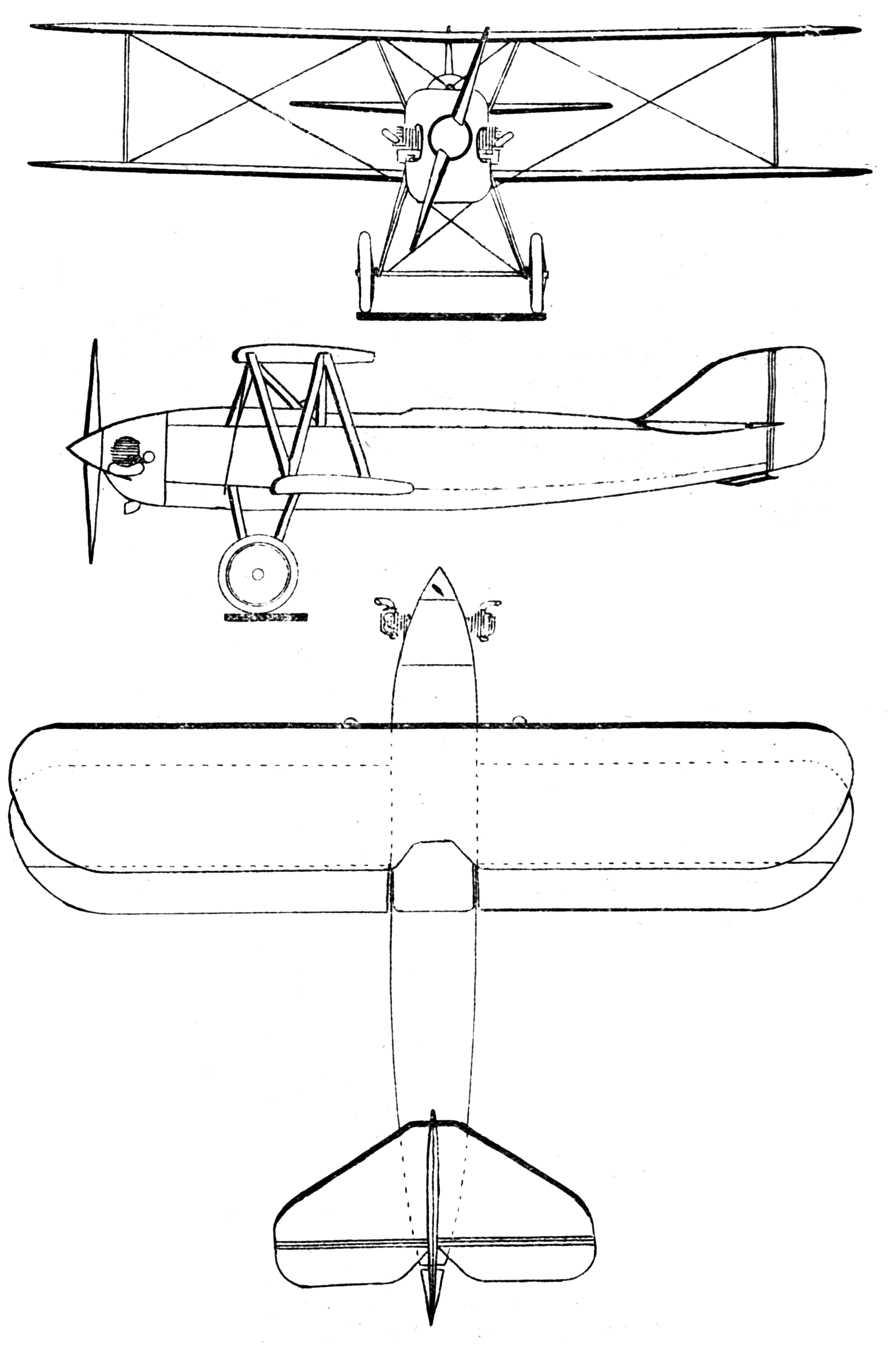
Powell PH 3-view drawing from Les Ailes January 7, 1926

Data from experimenter

General characteristics

- Capacity: one
- Length: 14 ft (4.3 m)
- Wingspan: 15 ft 9 in (4.80 m)
- Wing area: 76 sq ft (7.1 m^{2})
- Airfoil: RAF 15
- Empty weight: 310 lb (141 kg)
- Gross weight: 475 lb (215 kg)
- Fuel capacity: 8 gal (30 litres)
- Powerplant: 1 × Bristol Cherub , 32 hp (24 kW)
- Propellers: single blade Curtiss-Ried

Performance

- Maximum speed: 74 kn (85 mph, 137 km/h)
- Cruise speed: 65 kn (75 mph, 121 km/h)
- Stall speed: 43 kn (50 mph, 80 km/h)
- Range: 350 nmi (400 mi, 640 km)
