= Shirlen Big Cootie =

General information
- Type: Biplane
- National origin: United States
- Designer: Roy L Shirlen

History
- Developed from: Powell PH Racer

The Shirlen Big Cootie is an American homebuilt biplane that was designed by Roy Shirlen.

== Design and development ==
The Big Cootie is a modernized version of the Powell PH Racer biplane for homebuilt construction. The aircraft is a single seat biplane with conventional landing gear, designed for mild aerobatics. The fuselage is welded steel tube construction with aircraft fabric covering. The cowling is fiberglass. The ailerons are controlled with push-pull tubes. The wings use wooden spars with plywood leading edges.

== Operational history ==
The prototype survived an in-flight impact with powerlines during its initial testing. It was rebuilt at the Piedmont Aerospace Institute at Smith Reynolds Airport in Winston-Salem, North Carolina. A Continental A-80 80 hp (60 kW) engine replaced the Lycoming O-145 65 hp (48 kW) engine installed in the prototype.

== Specifications (Shirlen Big Cootie) ==
Data from Plane & Pilot

General characteristics

- Crew: 1
- Length: 15 ft 9 in (4.80 m)
- Wingspan: 15 ft (4.6 m)
- Airfoil: RAF 15
- Empty weight: 467 lb (212 kg)
- Gross weight: 750 lb (340 kg)
- Fuel capacity: 12 U.S. gallons (45 L; 10.0 imp gal)
- Powerplant: 1 × Lycoming O-145 horizontally opposed piston aircraft engine, 65 hp (48 kW)
- Propellers: 2-bladed

Performance

- Maximum speed: 120 kn (140 mph, 230 km/h)
- Cruise speed: 100 kn (120 mph, 190 km/h)
- Stall speed: 55 kn (63 mph, 101 km/h)
- Range: 260 nmi (300 mi, 480 km)
- g limits: -4g

== See also ==
Related development

- Powell PH Racer

Aircraft of comparable role, configuration, and era

- Baby Great Lakes
