= Jameson RJJ-1 Gipsy Hawk =

Light aircraft design

RJJ-1 Gypsy Hawk
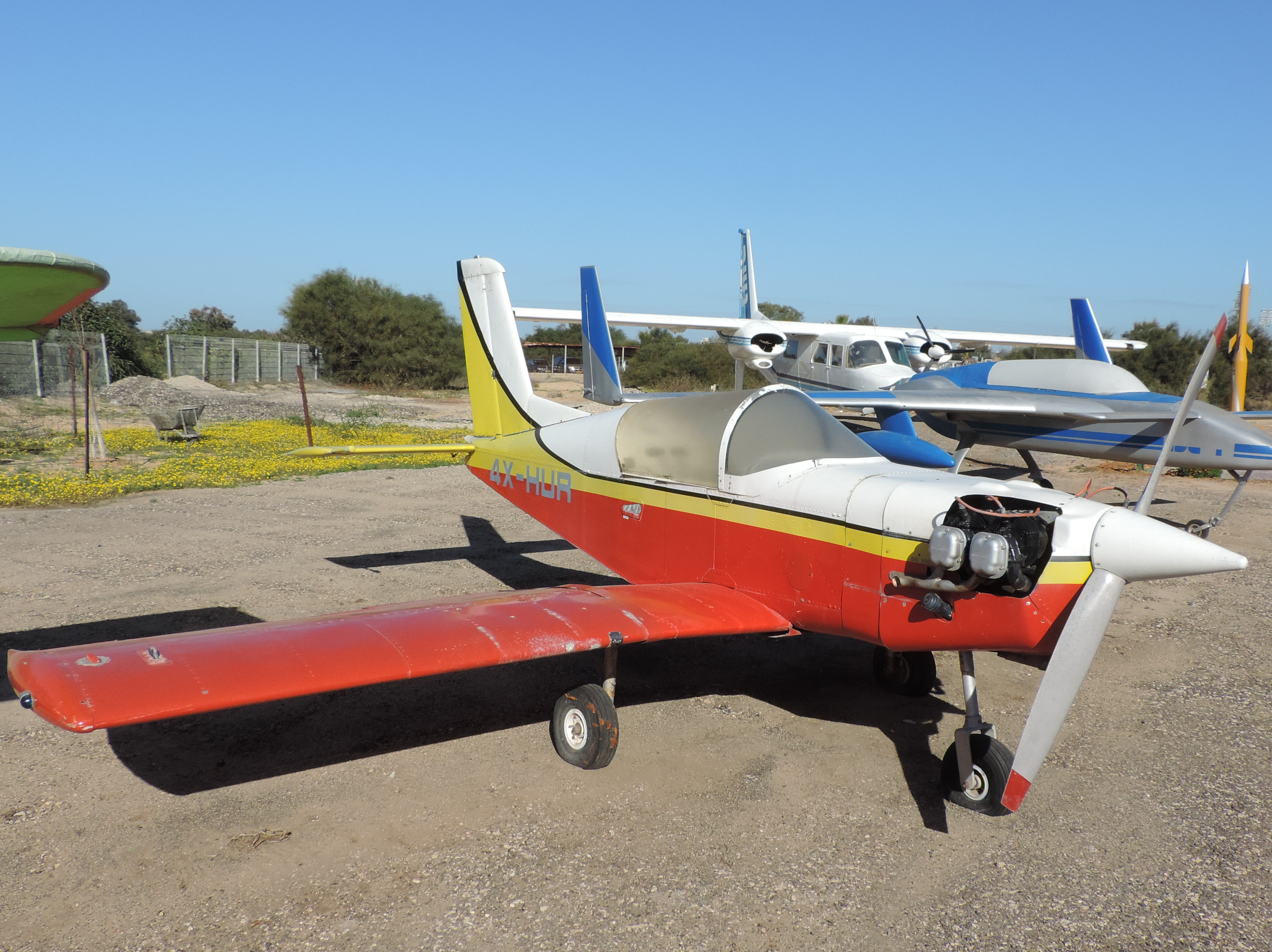
- Jameson Gipsy Hawk at the Rishon LeZion Air and Space Museum

General information
- Type: Single seat homebuilt light aircraft
- National origin: U.S.
- Designer: Richard J. Jameson
- Number built: 1

History
- First flight: 1972

The Jameson RJJ-1 Gipsy Hawk was a single-engine light aircraft intended to be homebuilt from plans. The prototype was designed and constructed in the U.S. by Richard Jameson in the late 1960s-early 1970s.

== Design and development ==
The Gypsy Hawk was an all-metal low wing monoplane, constructed throughout from light alloy angle spars and frames under a light alloy skin. The wings and tailplane had constant chord and square tips. There was a fuel tank in the outer panel of each wing. The all-moving tail was set at the extreme rear fuselage and had external mass balances and an anti-servo tab. The fin and rudder were further forward, swept and with a fillet to lead the fin into the strongly sloping upper fuselage.

The fuselage was a light alloy semi-monocoque with a nose-mounted 65 hp (48 kW) Continental A65 flat-four engine driving a fixed pitch, two-blade propeller. The single-seat cockpit placed the pilot over the wing under a two-piece blown canopy. The Gypsy Hawk had a fixed, unfaired tricycle undercarriage.

Construction of the Gypsy Hawk began about 1968 and the first flight was in 1972.

== Operational history ==
By the end of February 1974 the Gypsy Hawk had logged 200 hours of testing but there is no record of other examples.

By November 2012 the sole example was no longer registered in the United States with the Federal Aviation Administration and may no longer exist.

== Specifications ==
Data from Jane's All the World's Aircraft 1974-75

General characteristics

- Capacity: one
- Length: 16 ft 1 in (4.90 m)
- Wingspan: 18 ft 8 in (5.69 m)
- Height: 6 ft 9 in (2.06 m)
- Airfoil: NACA 747A315
- Empty weight: 520 lb (236 kg)
- Max takeoff weight: 820 lb (372 kg)
- Fuel capacity: c.20 US gal (76 L; 17 Imp gal)
- Powerplant: 1 × Continental A65 air-cooled flat four piston, 65 hp (48 kW)
- Propellers: 2-bladed

Performance

- Maximum speed: 125 mph (201 km/h, 109 kn)
- Cruise speed: 115 mph (185 km/h, 100 kn)
- Stall speed: 65 mph (105 km/h, 56 kn)
- Endurance: 4 hr
- Rate of climb: 900 ft/min (4.6 m/s) maximum, at sea level
- Take-off run: 800 ft (244 m)
- Landing Speed: 75-80 mph (121-129 km/h; 65-69 kn)
