= E & P Special =

Special

General information
- Type: Single seat sports aircraft
- National origin: United States
- Designer: Elston and Pruitt
- Number built: 2

History
- First flight: c. September 1972

The E & P Special, sometimes known as the Elston E & P Special, is a homebuilt, single-seat sports aircraft built in the United States and first flown in 1972. Only two were completed; one remains active.

== Design and development ==
Elston and Pruitt began construction of their Special in September 1969. They completed the first example in September 1972, following it with a second machine in April 1973.

The Special is a fabric covered, mid-wing monoplane. The straight, constant chord, wood framed wings are set with 1° of dihedral and braced with underwing V-shaped pairs of struts, one on each side. There are plain wood framed ailerons but no flaps. Its fuselage and empennage have a welded steel tube structure. The tail is braced and the tailplane incidence ground-adjustable; the rudder has a curved top and trailing edge and extends between the elevators down to the fuselage keel.

The Special is powered by a 65 hp (48 kW) Continental A65 air-cooled flat-four piston engine driving a fixed pitch propeller and fuelled from a tank immediately aft of the engine firewall. Its single-seat cockpit is covered by a two-piece, rearward sliding canopy; there is a small luggage space behind the seat. The undercarriage is of the tailwheel type with the mainwheels on spring steel cantilever legs. These wheels have hydraulic brakes and are enclosed in long glass fibre fairings. The tailwheel is steerable.

== Operational history ==
The first Special remains registered by the Federal Aviation Administration.

== Specifications ==
Data from Jane's All the World's Aircraft 1974-75

General characteristics

- Crew: one
- Length: 17 ft 11 in (5.46 m)
- Wingspan: 23 ft 0 in (7.01 m)
- Wing area: 92.0 sq ft (8.55 m^{2})
- Aspect ratio: 5.75
- Empty weight: 844 lb (383 kg)
- Max takeoff weight: 1,052 lb (477 kg)
- Fuel capacity: 15 US gal (12.5 Imp gal; 56.8 L)
- Powerplant: 1 × Continental A65-8 air-cooled flat four, 65 hp (48 kW)
- Propellers: 2-bladed, 5 ft 9 in (1.75 m) diameter fixed pitch

Performance

- Cruise speed: 115 mph (185 km/h, 100 kn) economical
- Stall speed: 55 mph (89 km/h, 48 kn)
- Never exceed speed: 140 mph (225 km/h, 121 kn)
- Range: 320 mi (515 km, 278 nmi) with maximum fuel
- Rate of climb: 900 ft/min (4.6 m/s)
- Wing loading: 11.4 lb/sq ft (55.7 kg/m^{2}) maximum
- Take-of and landing distances: 475 ft (145 m)

Avionics

- Com transceiver
