= Harris Geodetic LW 108 =

American homebuilt aircraft

Geodetic LW 108

General information
- Type: Homebuilt aircraft
- National origin: United States
- Designer: J. Warren Harris
- Status: Production completed

The Harris Geodetic LW 108 is an American homebuilt aircraft that was designed by J. Warren Harris of Vernal, Utah and made available in the form of plans for amateur construction.

== Design and development ==
The aircraft features a cantilever low-wing, a two-seats-in-side-by-side configuration enclosed cockpit under a bubble canopy, fixed landing gear and a single engine in tractor configuration.

The aircraft is made from spruce and plywood, with the fuselage a geodetic airframe structure, producing a strong, lightweight and low-drag shape. Its wing has a span of 28.1 ft (8.6 m). The standard engine recommended was the 80 hp (60 kW) Continental A80.

The aircraft has an empty weight of 585 lb (265 kg) and a gross weight of 1,000 lb (450 kg), giving a useful load of 415 lb (188 kg). With full fuel of 16 U.S. gallons (61 L; 13 imp gal) the payload is 319 lb (145 kg).

== Operational history ==
By October 2013 no examples remained registered in the United States with the Federal Aviation Administration and it is possible that none exist any more.

== Specifications (Geodetic LW 108) ==
Data from Plane and Pilot

General characteristics

- Crew: one
- Capacity: one passenger
- Length: 19 ft 4 in (5.89 m)
- Wingspan: 28 ft 1 in (8.56 m)
- Empty weight: 585 lb (265 kg)
- Gross weight: 1,000 lb (454 kg)
- Fuel capacity: 16 U.S. gallons (61 L; 13 imp gal)
- Powerplant: 1 × Continental A80 four cylinder, air-cooled, four stroke aircraft engine, 80 hp (60 kW)

Performance

- Maximum speed: 150 mph (240 km/h, 130 kn)
- Cruise speed: 130 mph (210 km/h, 110 kn)
- Stall speed: 40 mph (64 km/h, 35 kn)
- Range: 400 mi (640 km, 350 nmi)
- Rate of climb: 1,500 ft/min (7.6 m/s)
