= Porterfield Aircraft Corporation =

American Aircraft Design and manufacturing company

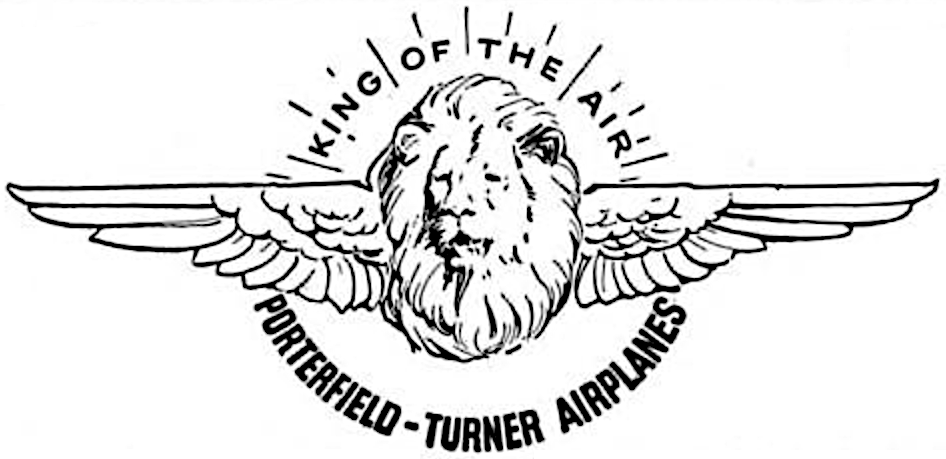
- Industry: Aerospace
- Founded: June 1934
- Founder: Edward E. Porterfield, Jr.
- Defunct: 1942
- Successor: Ward Furniture Company
- Headquarters: Kansas City, Missouri, United States
- Key people: William Skinner

The Porterfield Aircraft Corporation was an American aircraft design and manufacturing company founded in 1934 in Kansas by Edward E. Porterfield.

== History ==
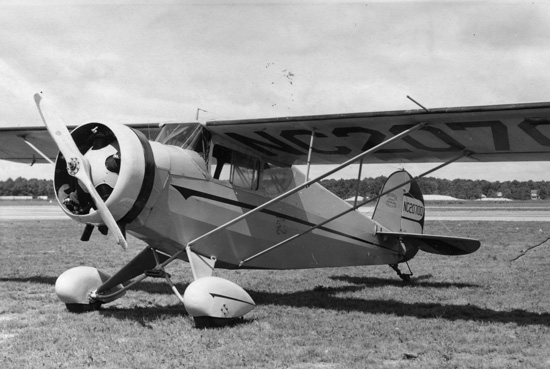
Porterfield 35-70 Flyabout

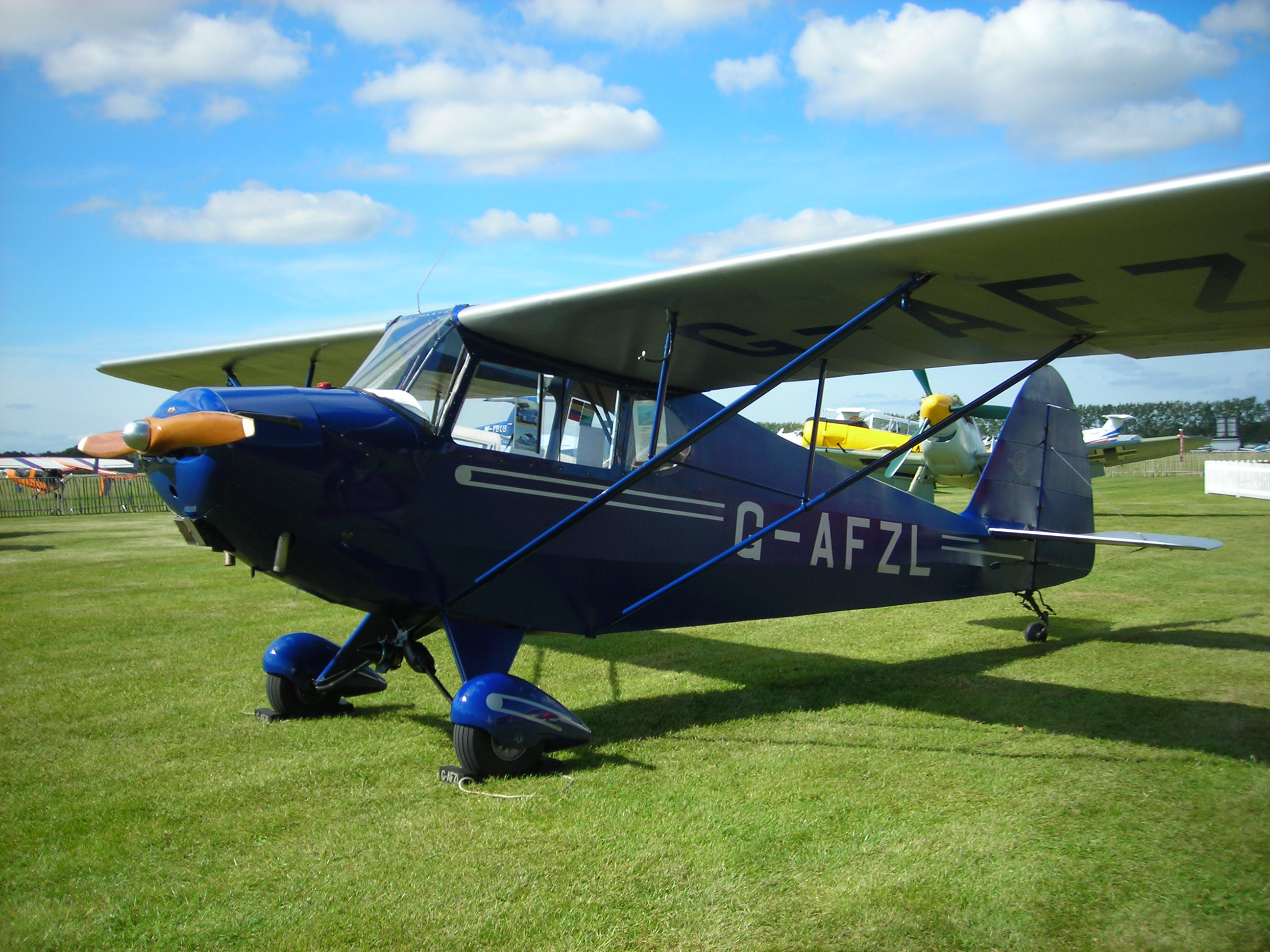
Porterfield CP-50 Collegiate

Edward Porterfield was running a flying school at the Fairfax Airport, located in Kansas City, Kansas. He had been operating Jennies and Lincoln Standard biplane trainers, and felt the need for a more suitable and better-performing trainer aircraft. He consulted with several aeronautical engineers of the period, including Giuseppe Mario Bellanca, and soon launched the production of several light single-engine two-seat high-wing and biplane aircraft. Then, in 1925, he started the American Eagle Aircraft Corporation.

Late in 1929, the worldwide stock market crash severely depressed the sale of non-essential items such as sport airplanes, although American Eagle continued producing airplanes until 1931. Early in that year, Porterfield's company declared bankruptcy and halted production. On 15 May 1931, the company's assets were purchased by the Lincoln-Page Aircraft Company of Lincoln, Nebraska, and Porterfield assumed the title of aircraft sales representative of that company, which became known as the American Eagle-Lincoln Aircraft Corporation, with production headquarters in Lincoln.

Porterfield left the company in 1932, forming then the Porterfield Aircraft Company in 1934. The new company was seen as a comeback for Porterfield and in 1937 it leased the former Federal Sash and Door Company factory. While it never achieved the numerical success of the larger light aircraft manufacturers such as Piper Aircraft, Aeronca and Taylorcraft, the planes were well made and popular with pilots. A focus on selling to Central and South American countries achieved some success. With the start of World War II, however, light aircraft production for civilian use came to a stop. Harlow Aircraft Company bought a one-third interest in the company in 1940. In an attempt to take advantage of the large growth in training due to the war, the company founded a technical school in December and purchased another in 1941. Bigger companies took great benefit from military contracts but Porterfield, with no large military orders forthcoming, eventually shut down. The final straw for the company came in 1942, when it failed to secure a contract to build liaison aircraft for the U.S. military.

Portfield was succeeded by the Columbia Aircraft Company, which was created when the firm Auchincloss, Parker & Redpath took over the former. However, Columbia itself soon went into receivership. The Ward Furniture Company later took over Porterfield's inventory and glider production contracts. A case regarding ownership/receivership would finally be brought before Supreme Court of Missouri

Edward Porterfield died from a heart attack in 1948.

== Aircraft ==
| Model name | First flight | Number built | Type |
|---|---|---|---|
| Porterfield 35 | 1935 | 240+ | Single engine cabin monoplane |
| Porterfield Collegiate | 1936 | 476 | Single engine cabin monoplane |

== See also ==
- American Eagle Aircraft Corporation
