= Bearhawk LSA =

American homebuilt airplane

LSA
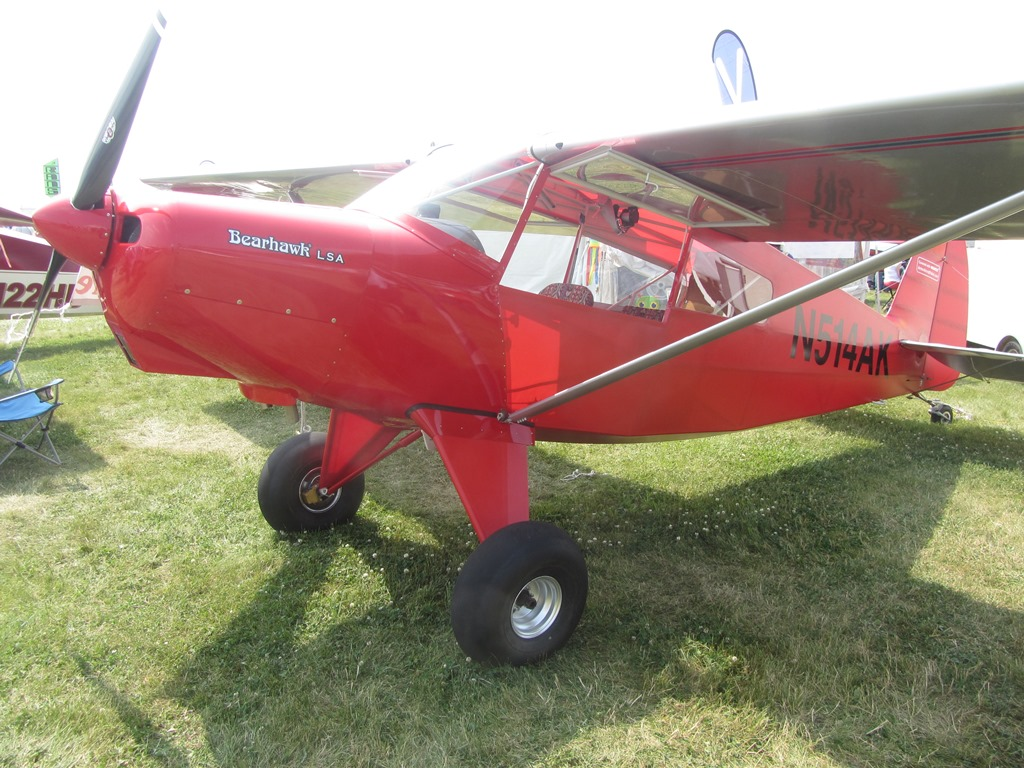

General information
- Type: Amateur-built Light-sport aircraft
- National origin: United States
- Manufacturer: Bearhawk Aircraft
- Designer: Bob Barrows
- Status: Plans available (2012), Kit available (2013)

History
- Introduction date: 2012

The Bearhawk LSA is an American experimental amateur-built aircraft, designed by Bob Barrows. The aircraft is scratch-built from plans or from a kit sold by Bearhawk Aircraft of Fairview, Oklahoma, United States.

The aircraft was introduced to the public at AirVenture 2012.

== Design and development ==
The Bearhawk LSA is a "clean sheet design" inspired by the larger Bearhawk Patrol. The LSA features a strut-braced high-wing, a tandem enclosed cockpit accessed by a single right-side door, fixed conventional landing gear and a single engine in tractor configuration. The cockpit is 31 in (79 cm) wide. In 2015 a quick-build kit was introduced at the U.S Sport Aviation Expo.

The aircraft fuselage is fabricated from welded 4130 steel tubing covered in heat-shrunk aircraft fabric. The aluminum structure wing, covered in flush riveted aluminum sheet, employs a Harry Riblett-designed GA30-613.5 airfoil and does not have flaps. The wing is supported by a single strut per side. Recommended engines include the 65 hp (48 kW) Continental A-65, 75 hp (56 kW) Continental A-75 and the 100–110 hp (75–82 kW) Continental O-200 four-stroke power plants. However, many other engine options are available including Lycoming, Corvair, ULPower, and Rotax with many exceeding 110 hp.

The aircraft is designed for a maximum gross weight of 1,500 lb (680 kg) in the utility category, but was limited to 1,320 lb (600 kg) in the US light-sport aircraft category prior to the changes made by the FAA MOSAIC rules. Under the new rules, sport pilots can now fly this aircraft up to the maximum gross of 1500 lbs.

== Operational history ==
As of April 2025, 21 completed airplanes of this model were registered in the United States with the Federal Aviation Administration. Many more are currently being built around the globe as seen on the Bearhawk Forums map.

== Specifications (LSA) ==
Data from Kitplanes and Bob Barrows

General characteristics

- Crew: one
- Capacity: one passenger
- Length: 22 ft 3 in (6.78 m)
- Wingspan: 34 ft (10 m)
- Height: 6 ft 3 in (1.91 m) in three-point
- Wing area: 170 sq ft (16 m^{2})
- Airfoil: Custom Harry Riblett airfoil (GA30-613.5)
- Empty weight: 720 lb (327 kg)
- Gross weight: 1,500 lb (680 kg)
- Fuel capacity: 30 U.S. gallons (110 L; 25 imp gal)
- Powerplant: 1 × Continental A-75 four cylinder, air-cooled, four stroke aircraft engine, 75 hp (56 kW)
- Propellers: 2-bladed aluminium

Performance

- Cruise speed: 125 mph (201 km/h, 109 kn)
- Stall speed: 30 mph (48 km/h, 26 kn)
- Never exceed speed: 140 mph (230 km/h, 120 kn)
