= Wolf W-11 Boredom Fighter =

American homebuilt aircraft

W-11 Boredom Fighter
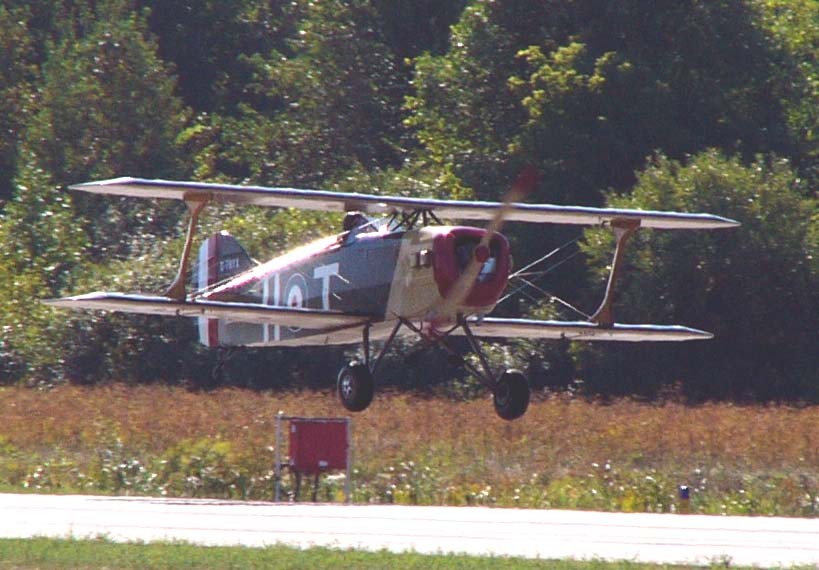

General information
- Type: Homebuilt light aircraft
- National origin: United States
- Manufacturer: Donald Wolf
- Designer: Donald Wolf

History
- First flight: 30 August 1979

The Wolf W-11 Boredom Fighter is an American single-seat biplane designed by Donald Wolf of Huntington, New York. The aircraft is supplied as plans for amateur construction.

== Design and development ==
The Boredom Fighter is a single-seat biplane designed to resemble a First World War SPAD S.XIII and completed aircraft are often painted in markings from that war.

The aircraft is constructed of wood, has fixed conventional landing gear with a tailskid, and the recommended powerplant is the 65 hp (48 kW) Continental A65 piston engine.

== Specifications ==
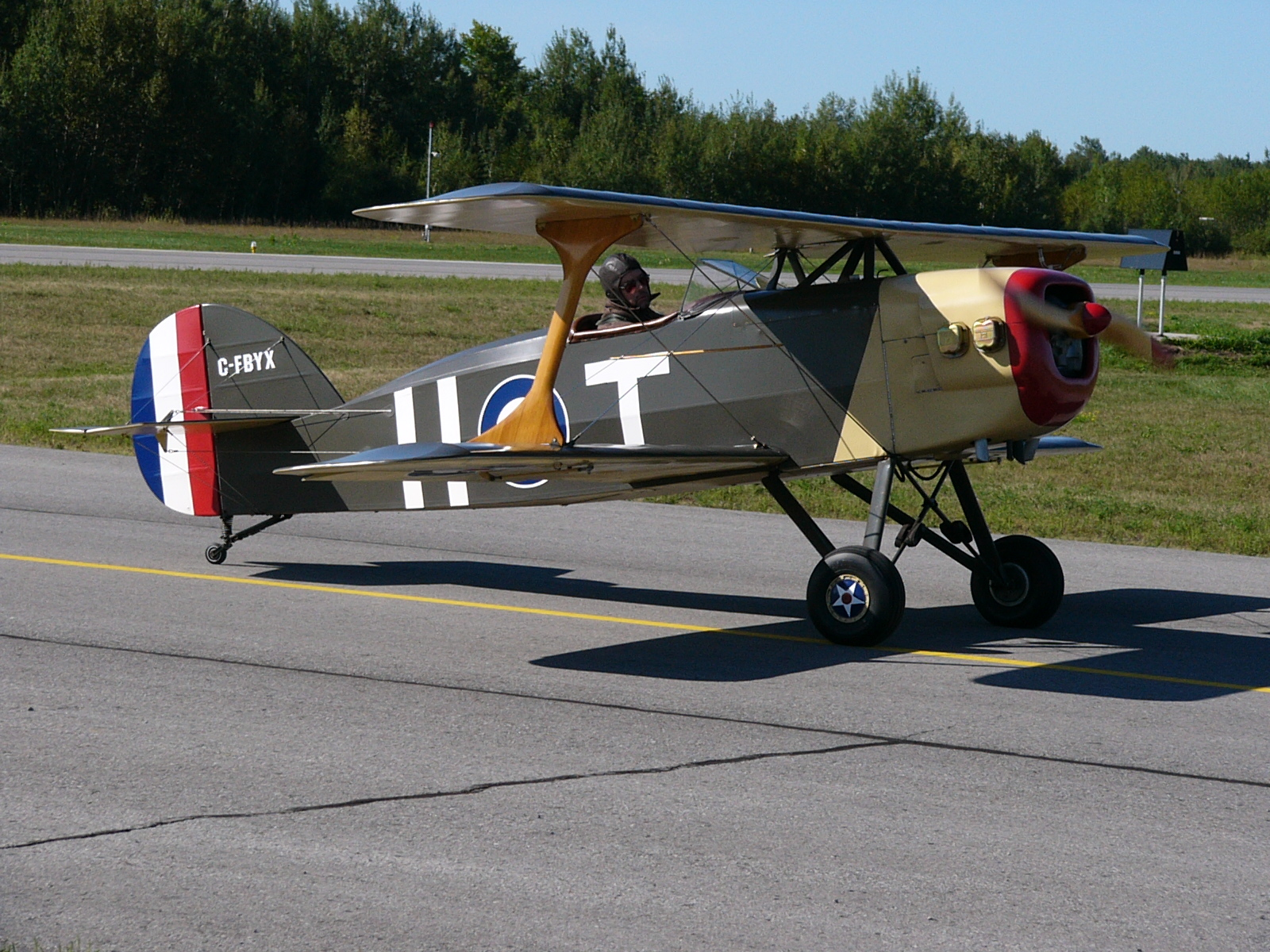
Wolf W-11 Boredom Fighter

Data from Brassey's World Aircraft & Systems Directory

General characteristics

- Crew: 1
- Length: 15 ft 8.5 in (4.79 m)
- Wingspan: 20 ft 0 in (6.1 m)
- Empty weight: 473 lb (215 kg)
- Gross weight: 770 lb (349 kg)
- Powerplant: 1 × Continental A65 , 65 hp (49 kW)

Performance

- Maximum speed: 118 mph (190 km/h, 103 kn)
- Stall speed: 42 mph (69 km/h, 36 kn)
- Range: 440 mi (708 km, 380 nmi)
- Rate of climb: 1,200 ft/min (6.1 m/s)
