= Bearhawk 5 =

Amateur-built aircraft design

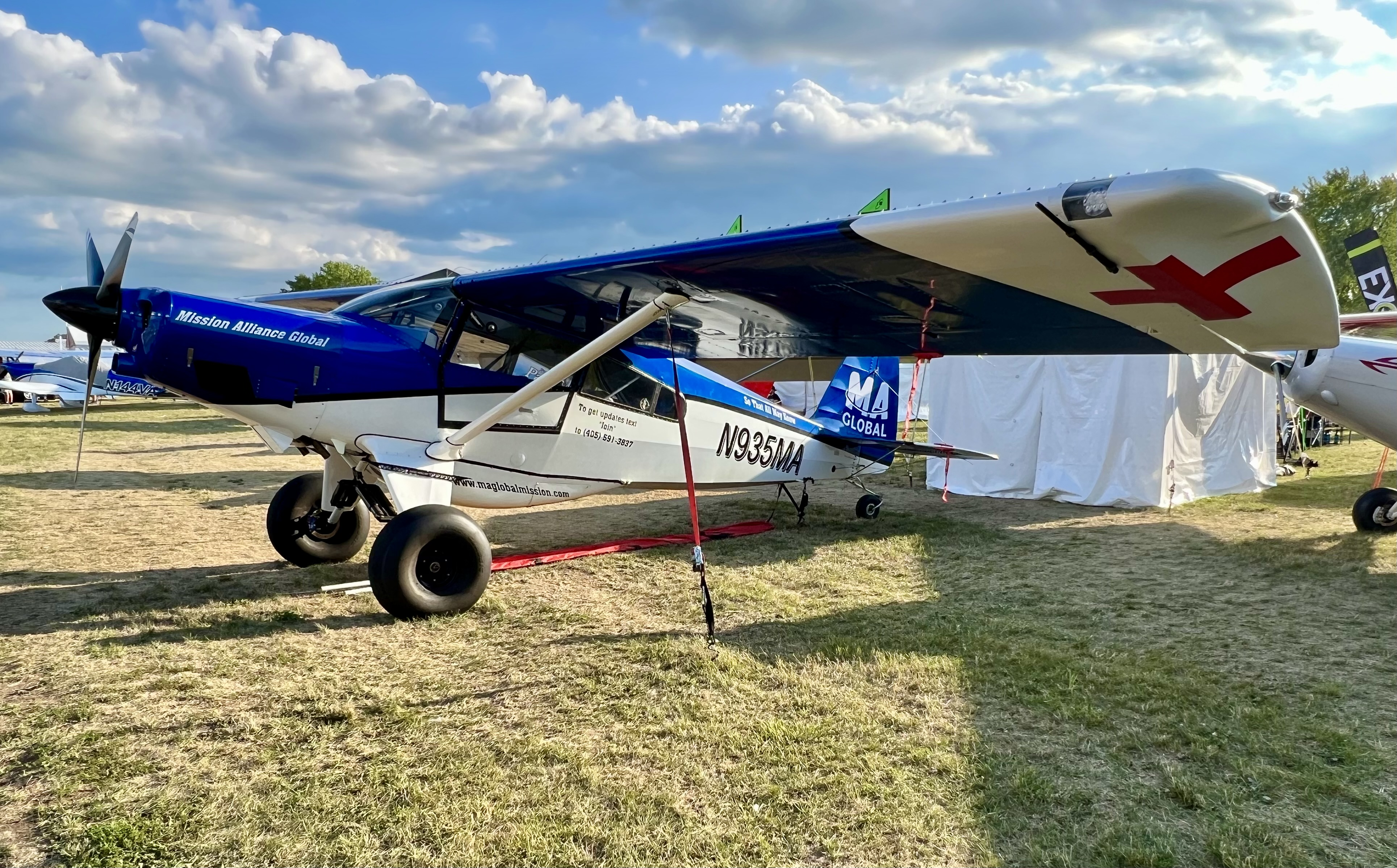

General information
- Type: Amateur-built aircraft
- National origin: United States
- Manufacturer: Bearhawk Aircraft
- Designer: Bob Barrows
- Status: In production (2023)
- Number built: One

History
- Manufactured: 2020-present
- Introduction date: 2020
- First flight: 3 May 2020
- Developed from: Bearhawk 4-Place Model B

The Bearhawk 5 is a five-to-six seat American amateur-built aircraft, designed by Bob Barrows and under development by Bearhawk Aircraft. The aircraft is supplied as a kit for amateur construction.

== Development ==
The design was initiated at the request of a friend of Bob Barrows, who was looking for a Bearhawk 4-Place, but with greater capacity. Barrows completed the drawings and the builder started construction of the design, until health issues caused him to abandon the project. A year later, Mark Goldberg, president of Avipro/Bearhawk Aircraft, described the incomplete project to Collin Campbell of Bolivar, Missouri, who was looking for a new building project, after having built several Bearhawk designs in the past. Campbell agreed to complete the prototype and it first flew on 3 May 2020. By 21 May 2020 the prototype had completed five hours of test flying.

== Design ==
Based on the Bearhawk 4-Place Model B, the new design is 2 in (5 cm) wider, with a cabin 14 in (36 cm) longer and an overall length 24 in (61 cm) longer. The stretched cabin permits the installation of a fifth and sixth seat or additional baggage.

The aircraft features a strut-braced high-wing, a five or six seat enclosed cabin accessed by doors that is wide, fixed conventional landing gear and a single engine in tractor configuration.

The fuselage is constructed from welded 4130 steel tubing covered with doped fabric, while the wings are constructed from riveted aluminum sheet. The wings are identical to the Bearhawk 4-Place Model B, employing the same Riblett 30-413.5 airfoil and mounting flaps. The aircraft's recommended engine power range is 250 to 315 hp (186 to 235 kW) and standard engines used include the 250 hp (186 kW) Lycoming O-540, although the recommended engine is the 315 hp (235 kW) Lycoming IO-580 four-stroke powerplant.

The test pilot, Rollie van Dorn, noted, "the Bearhawk Model 5 offered no surprises on takeoff or climb out. With all that power, things happen quickly."

== Operational history ==
As of December 2023, the prototype and three kit built examples have been registered in the United States with the Federal Aviation Administration.

In an extensive flight review in December 2020, AVweb writer Paul Dye note of its flight characteristics, "you’re obviously not going to mistake the Bearhawk 5 for a single-seat acrobatic machine, but both roll and pitch forces were surprisingly light for an airplane of this size. Rudder was appropriate and positive, and all three axes were harmonious enough to easily fly the airplane in formation with no prior practice. Of course, when working in formation, nothing is better than an excess of power for rapid acceleration when you need to pull forward (coupled to a constant-speed prop that slows you down quickly when you need to back up in a hurry), and the Bearhawk 5 has plenty of extra power. The three-blade Hartzell does a great job of turning that power into both acceleration and deceleration, so the package works pretty well."

== Specifications ==
Data from AVweb, Plane & Pilot, Aero News Network and Bearhawk Aircraft

General characteristics

- Crew: one
- Capacity: five passengers
- Length: 25 ft 6 in (7.77 m)
- Wingspan: 34 ft (10 m)
- Wing area: 186 sq ft (17.3 m^{2})
- Airfoil: Riblett 30-413.5
- Empty weight: 1,512 lb (686 kg) (projected)
- Gross weight: 3,000 lb (1,361 kg)
- Fuel capacity: 55 U.S. gallons (210 L; 46 imp gal)
- Powerplant: 1 × Lycoming IO-580 six cylinder, air-cooled, four stroke aircraft engine, 315 hp (235 kW)
- Propellers: 3-bladed Hartzell Propeller carbon-fiber Trailblazer constant speed propeller

Performance

- Maximum speed: 180 mph (290 km/h, 160 kn)
- Cruise speed: 160 mph (260 km/h, 140 kn) (projected)
- Stall speed: 40 mph (64 km/h, 35 kn)
- Wing loading: 16.1 lb/sq ft (79 kg/m^{2})
