= Bearhawk Companion =

Homebuilt kit aircraft

Companion
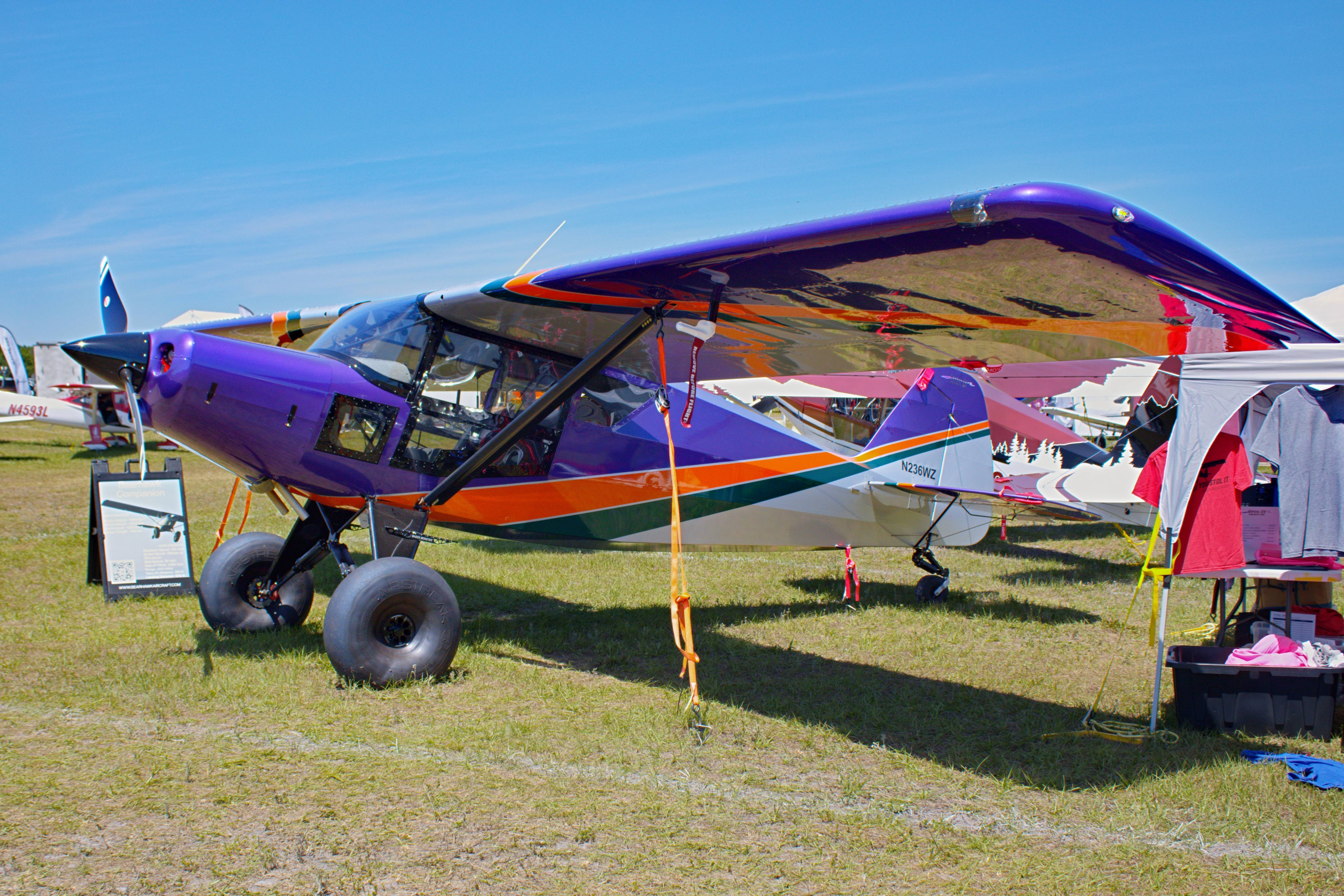
- Bearhawk Companion at 2026 Sun 'n Fun

General information
- Type: Amateur-built aircraft
- National origin: United States
- Manufacturer: Bearhawk Aircraft
- Designer: Bob Barrows
- Status: In production (2019)
- Number built: none

History
- First flight: May 17, 2021
- Developed from: Bearhawk Patrol

The Bearhawk Companion is an American amateur-built aircraft, designed by Bob Barrows, that is produced by Bearhawk Aircraft of Austin, Texas, introduced in August 2019. The aircraft is supplied as a kit for amateur construction, with first customer deliveries in October 2019.

== Design and development ==
The design goals for the Companion were to produce an aircraft with the features of the Bearhawk Patrol, but with side-by-side configuration seating, in response to customer demand and a deposit from a launch customer.

The Companion features a strut-braced high-wing, a two side-by-side seats in an enclosed cabin accessed by doors, fixed conventional landing gear and a single engine in tractor configuration.

The aircraft has a newly designed welded 4130 steel tubing fuselage, covered in doped aircraft fabric. The wing is identical to the Patrol wing and is made from aluminum sheet components and is covered in flush-riveted aluminum sheet. The acceptable engine power is 150 to 210 hp (112 to 157 kW) and will include four-stroke powerplants ranging from the Lycoming O-320 to the Lycoming IO-390.

The first flight of a completed aircraft by the launch customer took place on May 17, 2021. The aircraft took ten months and 1,000 hours to complete.

== Operational history ==
A 2021 review in Aviation Pros called it "a very rugged utility plane with a large area for cargo."

== Specifications (Companion) ==
Data from AvWeb

General characteristics

- Crew: one
- Capacity: one passenger
- Gross weight: 2,200 lb (998 kg)
- Powerplant: 1 × Lycoming O-320 four cylinder, air-cooled, four stroke aircraft engine, 150 hp (110 kW)

Performance

- Stall speed: 35 mph (56 km/h, 30 kn)
