= Barrows Bearhawk Patrol =

Bearhawk Patrol
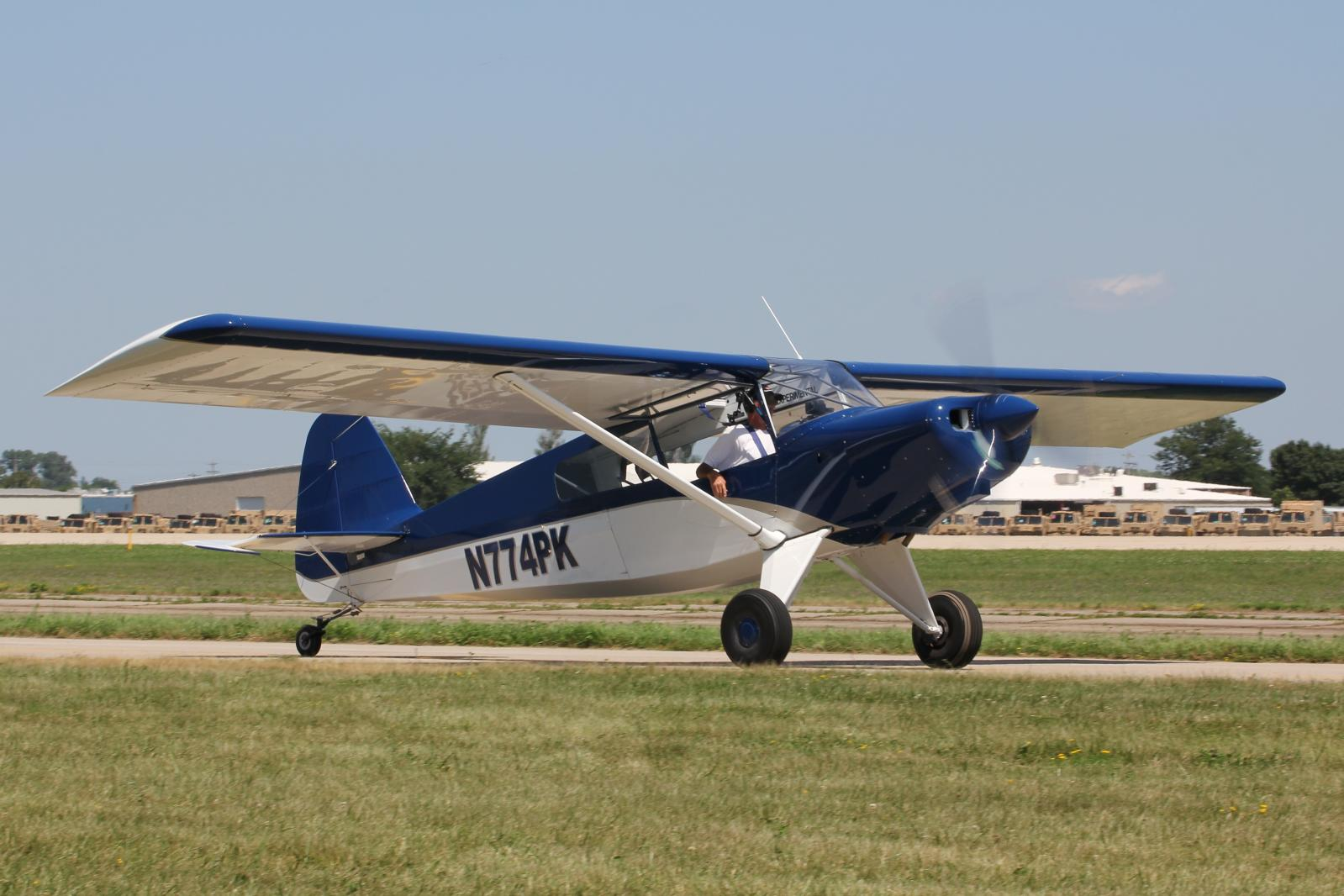

General information
- Type: Homebuilt aircraft
- National origin: United States
- Manufacturer: Bearhawk Aircraft
- Designer: Bob Barrows
- Status: In production (2012)
- Number built: 3 (2011)

History
- Developed from: Barrows Bearhawk
- Variant: Bearhawk Companion

The Barrows Bearhawk Patrol is a two-seat aircraft, that was designed to meet United States homebuilt aircraft category requirements. It was developed from the four-seat Barrows Bearhawk.

A development of the Patrol is the Bearhawk Companion, a two seat in side-by-side configuration variant.

== Design and development ==
The Bearhawk Patrol is designed to improve on the Piper Super Cub. It is a single engine, strut-braced, high-wing, tandem seat aircraft with conventional landing gear or floats. The fuselage is constructed with welded steel tubing with aircraft fabric covering. The wing spars and ribs are aluminum with aluminum covering. The flaps deploy up to 40 degrees.

== Specifications (Bearhawk Patrol) ==
Data from Manufactures website

General characteristics

- Crew: one
- Capacity: one passenger
- Length: 22 ft 8 in (6.91 m)
- Wingspan: 33 ft (10 m)
- Height: 6 ft 4 in (1.93 m)
- Wing area: 180 sq ft (17 m^{2})
- Airfoil: Riblett 30-413.5
- Empty weight: 950 lb (431 kg)
- Gross weight: 2,000 lb (907 kg)
- Fuel capacity: 55 U.S. gallons (210 L; 46 imp gal)
- Powerplant: 1 × Lycoming O-360 , 180 hp (130 kW)
- Propellers: 2-bladed

Performance

- Cruise speed: 120 kn (140 mph, 230 km/h)
- Stall speed: 30 kn (35 mph, 56 km/h)
- Never exceed speed: 143 kn (165 mph, 266 km/h)
- Range: 780 nmi (900 mi, 1,400 km)

== See also ==
Related development

- Barrows Bearhawk

Aircraft of comparable role, configuration, and era

- Piper PA-18
