= Porterfield 35 =

Model 35 Flyabout
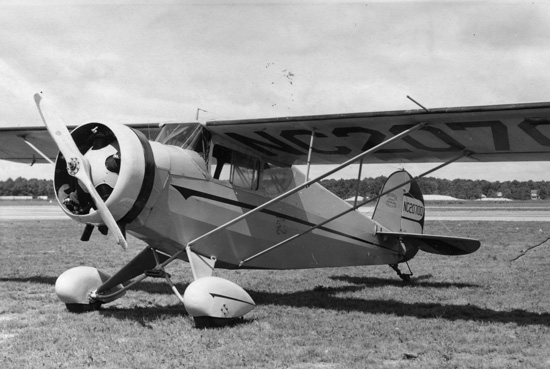

General information
- Type: two-seat cabin monoplane
- Manufacturer: Porterfield Aircraft Corporation
- Designer: Noel Hockaday
- Number built: 240+

History
- Introduction date: 1935
- First flight: 1935

The Porterfield Model 35 Flyabout was an American two-seat cabin monoplane built by the Porterfield Aircraft Corporation of Kansas City.

== Development ==
The aircraft was designed by Noel Hockaday and was built by students at the Wyandotte High School as the Wyandotte Pup. Porterfield Aircraft recognised the potential of the aircraft design and bought the design rights and also the services of Hockaday as works manager and designer. The Pup was developed to appear in 1935 as the Porterfield Model 35 Flyabout a braced high-wing-monoplane. It had a fixed tailskid landing gear and room for two. It was originally powered by a 60 hp (45 kW) LeBlond 5D radial engine. Variants later appeared with different engine installations and a deluxe model the De Luxe Sport. Over 240 aircraft were built.

== Variants ==
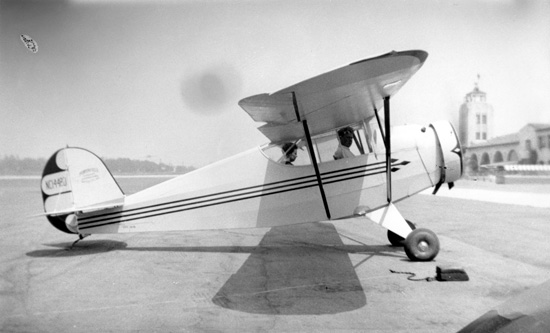
Porterfield 35-70

35
1935 production variant with a 60hp (45kW) LeBlond 5D radial engine
35-70 Flyabout
1937 production variant with a 70hp (52kW) LeBlond 5DE radial engine.
35-V
Variant powered by a 65hp (48kW) Velie M-5 engine.
35-W
Luxury model (also known as the Model 90) with a 90hp (67kW) Warner Scarab Junior radial engine.
Porterfield 75-C
75hp Continental A-75
Porterfield 90 (De Luxe Sport)
Sporty, deluxe version of 35-W

== Operators ==
New Zealand

- Royal New Zealand Air Force

== Specifications (Model 35-70) ==
Data from The Illustrated Encyclopedia of Aircraft (Part Work 1982-1985), 1985, Orbis Publishing, Page 2760

General characteristics

- Crew: 1
- Capacity: 1 passenger
- Length: 20 ft 3 in (6.17 m)
- Wingspan: 32 ft 0 in (9.75 m)
- Height: 6 ft 7 in (2.01 m)
- Wing area: 147 sq ft (13.66 m^{2})
- Empty weight: 806 lb (366 kg)
- Gross weight: 1,310 lb (594 kg)
- Powerplant: 1 × LeBlond 5DE radial piston , 70 hp (52 kW)

Performance

- Maximum speed: 115 mph (185 km/h, 100 kn)
- Range: 360 mi (579 km, 310 nmi)
- Service ceiling: 15,000 ft (4,570 m)

== Bibliography ==
- Bruno, Henri (January 2002). "Courrier des Lecteurs" [Readers' Letters]. Avions: Toute l'Aéronautique et son histoire (in French) (106): 4–5. ISSN 1243-8650.
- Cortet, Pierre (November 2001). "Rétros du Mois" [Retros of the Month]. Avions: Toute l'Aéronautique et son histoire (in French) (104): 8. ISSN 1243-8650.
- The Illustrated Encyclopedia of Aircraft (Part Work 1982-1985), 1985, Orbis Publishing, Page 2760
