= Franklin O-175 =

American piston aircraft engine

O-175/4AC-176
- Type: Piston aircraft engine
- National origin: United States
- Manufacturer: Franklin Engine Company
- First run: 1940

The Franklin O-175 (company designation 4AC-176) was an American air-cooled aircraft engine of the 1940s. The engine was of horizontally-opposed four-cylinder and displaced 175 cu in (2.9 L). The power output was nominally 80 hp (60 kW). A later variant was designated O-180, despite sharing the same displacement.

A related four-cylinder engine of slightly smaller capacity was known as the O-170 or 4AC-171. It produced 60 hp (45 kW).

== Variants ==
=== O-170 ===
4AC-171
60 hp (45 kW)

=== O-175 ===
4AC-176

4AC-176-B - 65 hp (48 kW) at 2,200 rpm
4AC-176-BA/(O-175-1) - 65 hp (48 kW) at 2,300 rpm
4AC-176-C - 75 hp (56 kW) at 2,500 rpm
4AC-176-D - 80 hp (60 kW) at 2,650 rpm
4AC-176-F - 80 hp (60 kW) at 2,500 rpm

4ACG-176

=== O-180 ===
4AC-176-F3 (O-180-1)

== Applications ==
- Aeronca L-3D
- Bowyer BW-1 flying wing
- CAP-4 Paulistinha
- Harris Little Jewel
- Interstate Cadet
- IPT-7 Junior
- Jensen Sport (O-170)
- Johnson-Funke monoplane
- Langley Twin
- Piper J-3 Cub
- Piper J-4
- Piper L-4
- Porterfield Collegiate
- Taylorcraft BF-60 (O-170)
- Taylorcraft BF-65

== Specifications (4AC-176-BA2, O-175-1) ==
Data from Wilkinson

=== General characteristics ===
- Type: 4-cylinder air-cooled horizontally opposed aircraft piston engine
- Bore: 4 in (102 mm)
- Stroke: 3.5 in (89 mm)
- Displacement: 176 cu in (2.88 L)
- Length: 28.6 in (726 mm)
- Width: 30.2 in (767 mm)
- Height: 20 in (508 mm)
- Dry weight: 182 lb (82.6 kg)

=== Components ===
- Valvetrain: OHV, 1x inlet valve, 1x exhaust valve operated by pushrods
- Fuel system: 1x Marvel-Schebler MA-3P updraught carburetor
- Fuel type: 73 octane gasoline
- Oil system: Pressure system at 40 psi (3 bar), wet sump
- Cooling system: Air-cooled

=== Performance ===
- Power output: 65 hp (48.5 kW) at 2,300 rpm for take-off
- Specific power: 0.37 hp/(cu in) (16.837 kW/L)
- Compression ratio: 6:1
- Specific fuel consumption: 0.49 lb/(hp h) (0.298 kg/(kW h), 220 US gal/(hp h)) cruising
- Oil consumption: 0.003 lb/(hp h) (0.0018 kg/(kW h), 1.4 US gal/(hp h)) cruising
- Power-to-weight ratio: 0.357 hp/lb (0.587 kW/kg)

== See also ==
Related lists

- List of aircraft engines
