= Companhia Aeronáutica Paulista =

Airplane manufacturer in the Brazil

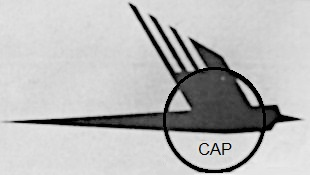
- Company type: Private
- Industry: Aerospace
- Founded: 1942; 84 years ago
- Founder: Francisco Pignatari
- Defunct: 1948; 78 years ago
- Fate: Acquired by Neiva
- Headquarters: São Paulo, São Paulo (state), Brazil
- Key people: Jorge de la Roche Fragoso
- Products: Aircraft

Companhia Aeronáutica Paulista usually known as CAP was a Brazilian aircraft manufacturer established in São Paulo. It was founded with the assets of Empresa Aeronáutica Ypiranga in 1942.

== History ==
=== Empresa Aeronáutica Ypiranga ===
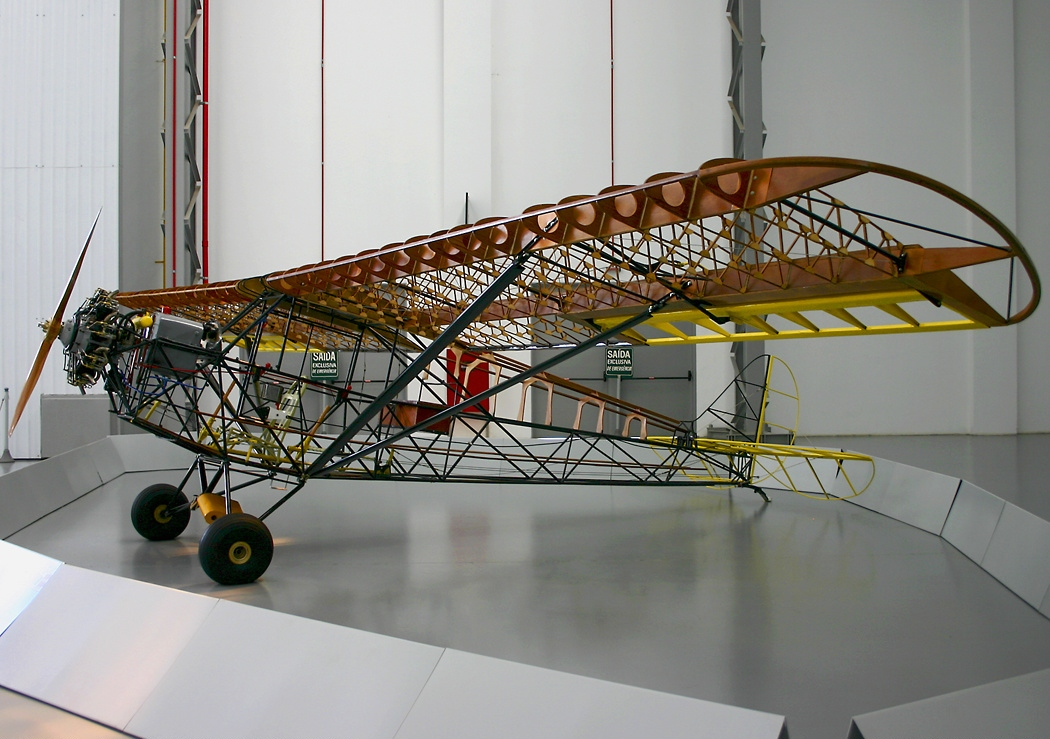
EAY 201 Ypiranga AN1197714

Empresa Aeronáutica Ypiranga, commonly shortened to EAY, was a Brazilian aircraft manufacturer based in São Paulo and founded in 1931 by American Orton Hoover, Brazilian Henrique Dumont Villares and German Fritz Roesler. In 1914, Orton Hoover came to Brazil to assemble three Curtiss-Wright seaplanes purchased by the Brazilian Navy. He settled permanently in Brazil in 1928 and worked with Federico Brotero on the development of the IPT Bichinho a single-seat sport aircraft. Henrique Dumont Villares was the nephew of Alberto Santos Dumont and Fritz Roesler was a German fighter pilot in World War I before going to Brazil. Roesler founded a flight school near São Paulo in 1923 and, together with George Coubisier, Francisco Matarazzo and others, the VASP airline.

Empresa Aeronáutica Ypiranga began operations with the production of the EAY-101 glider, a copy of the Stamer Lippisch Zögling, of which six were built. The second aircraft model EAY-201 was a copy of the Taylor Cub. The EAY-201 was a two-seat trainer aircraft and first flew in 1935, with only five examples built. EAY was then acquired by Companhia Aeronáutica Paulista in 1942. The EAY-201 now continued in production as the CAP-4 Paulistinha.

=== Companhia Aeronáutica Paulista ===
From Empresa Aeronáutica Ypiranga it acquired the design that was to become its most important product, the CAP-4. Despite strong sales of this aircraft (nearly 800 were built), the company ran into financial problems in 1948 and was forced to close. The remaining assets were nationalized, with some eventually being taken over by Neiva.

== Aircraft ==
=== EAY ===
Summary of aircraft built by EAY
Model name	First flight	Number built	Type
EAY Primário		3	High-wing Glider
EAY Secundário		6	High-wing Glider
EAY Ypiranga	1935	5	Two-seat Trainer Aircraft

=== CAP ===
Summary of aircraft built by CAP
Model name	First flight	Number built	Type
CAP-1 Planalto	1942	20	Military trainer aircraft
CAP-4 Paulistinha	1935	789	Two seat trainer aircraft
CAP-5 Carioca	1945	7	Civil trainer aircraft

== See also ==
- Indústria Aeronáutica Neiva
