= Franklin O-200 =

American air-cooled aircraft engine of the early 1940s

O-200/4AC-199
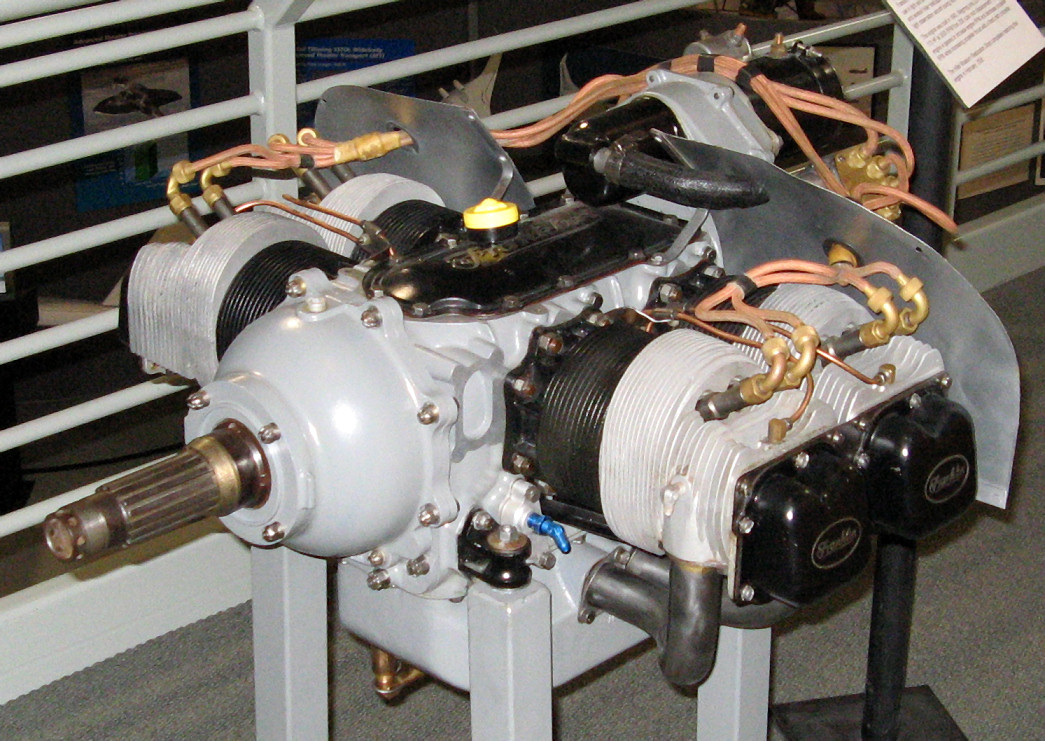
- Franklin O-200 engine on display at the Hiller Aviation Museum
- Type: Piston aircraft engine
- National origin: United States
- Manufacturer: Franklin Engine Company
- First run: 1941

The Franklin O-200 (company designation 4AC-199) was an American air-cooled aircraft engine of the early 1940s. The engine was of four-cylinder, horizontally-opposed layout and displaced 200 cu in (3 L). The power output ranged between 65 hp (48 kW) and 100 hp (75 kW) depending on variant. The O-200-5 (4ACG-199) featured a geared propeller drive.

== Variants ==
4AC-199

O-200-1
O-200-3
O-200-7
O-200-9

4ACG-199

O-200-5

== Applications ==
=== Direct drive ===
- CAP-1 Planalto
- CAP-5 Carioca
- Aeronca Arrow
- Babcock LC-11
- Culver Cadet
- LAR-90
- XPQ-8
- TDC-1 target drone
- Interstate Cadet
- Langley Twin
- Monocoupe 90
- Piasecki PV-2
- Rearwin Skyranger
- Sackett Jeanie
- Stinson 10
- Stinson L-9
- Stout Skycar

=== Geared drive ===
- Convair (Stinson) Model 103
- Spratt Tilt-Wing
- Goodyear Duck
- Interstate Cadet
- Interstate L-6
- Piper PA-7 Skycoupe

== Specifications (O-200-5/4ACG-199) ==
Data from

=== General characteristics ===
- Type: 4-cylinder air-cooled horizontally opposed aircraft piston engine
- Bore: 4.25 in (108 mm)
- Stroke: 3.5 in (88.9 mm)
- Displacement: 198.6 in³ (3.25 L)
- Dry weight: 224 lb (102 kg)

=== Components ===
- Cooling system: Air-cooled

=== Performance ===
- Power output: 102 hp (76 kW) at 3,500 rpm

== See also ==
Comparable engines

- Continental O-200

Related lists

- List of aircraft engines
