= List of Brazilian military aircraft =

List of Brazilian military aircraft is a list of historic military aircraft that have served with the Brazilian Armed Forces since the creation of its first aviation units in the early 1900s.

== 1910s and 20s ==
Aircraft	Origin	Years	Number	Role	Note	Image
Morane-Saulnier L	France	1915	~01	Attack/Reconnaissance	First Brazilian military aircraft. Participated in the Contestado War	
Morane-Saulnier Type A	France	1915-1916	~01	Observation	Participated in the Contestado War	
Nieuport 83	France	1916-1924	12	Fighter/Reconnaissance	Attacked rebel targets during the Tenente revolts.	
Caudron G.3	France	1917-1929	?	Fighter/Reconnaissance	Attacked rebel targets during the Tenente revolts.	
SPAD S.VII	France	1922-1932	15	Fighter	Participated in the Tenente revolts.	
Nieuport 21	France	1918-1927	06	Fighter	Participated in the Tenente revolts.	
Nieuport 24	France	1919-1931	10	Fighter/Bomber	Attacked rebel positions in the city of São Paulo during the Tenente revolts.	
Breguet 14	France	1919-1932	30	Fighter/Bomber/Reconnaissance	Attacked rebel positions in the city of São Paulo during the Tenente revolts.	
Caudron C.59	France	1923-1936	?	Fighter	Attacked rebel positions in the Tenente revolts.	
SPAD S.XIII	France	1921-1930	?	Fighter		
Morane-Saulnier MS.147	France	1928-1937	30	Observation/Trainer		
Potez 25	France	1927-1939	~14	Attack aircraft	Used by loyalist forces and rebels during the Constitutionalist War	
Breguet 19	France	1929-1936	05	Attack aircraft		
Waco 10	United States	1930-1937	08	Attack aircraft	Used by loyalist forces and rebels during the Constitutionalist War	
Amiot 120	France	1927-1936	05	Bomber aircraft	Used by loyalist forces during the Constitutionalist War	
Avro 504	United Kingdom	1928-1937	22	Fighter/Bomber	Used by loyalist forces during the Constitutionalist War	

== 1930s ==
Aircraft	Origin	Years	Number	Role	Note	Image
Avro 626	United Kingdom	1930-1940	16	Observation/Attack	Used in the Constitutionalist War	
Curtiss Fledgling	United States	1930-1942	?	Observation/Trainer		
Curtiss-Wright CW-12	United States	1932-1940	15	Observation/Trainer		
Morane-Saulnier MS.230	France	1930-1940	24	Observation/Trainer		
Savoia-Marchetti S.55	Italy	1930-1938	08	Observation/Maritime Patrol	Used in the Constitutionalist War	
Martin PM	United States	1931-1939	04	Maritime Patrol	Used in the Constitutionalist War	
Nieuport-Delage NiD 72	France	1931-1935	02	Light attack	Used by loyalist and rebel forces during the Constitutionalist War	
Focke-Wulf Fw 44	Nazi Germany/Argentina	1934-1941	?	Trainer		
Curtiss Falcon	United States	1932-1944	~20	Attack aircraft	Used by loyalist forces and rebels during the Constitutionalist War	
Vought O2U Corsair	United States	1930-1946	18	Observation/light attack	Used in the Constitutionalist War	
DH.60 Moth	United Kingdom	1932-1941	39	Basic trainer		
Boeing P-12	United States	1932-1951	14	Fighter aircraft		
Tiger Moth	United Kingdom	1933-1947	17	Trainer/Observation		
Vultee V-11	United States	1939-1949	31	Ground attack	Used in anti-submarine warfare during the Battle of the Atlantic in WWII.	
Douglas B-18 Bolo	United States	1937-1946	03	Medium bomber/Maritime patrol	Used to protect the Brazilian coast during the Battle of the Atlantic in WWII.	
Savoia-Marchetti SM.79	Italy	1936-1947	03	Bomber/Maritime Patrol	Used to protect the Brazilian coast during the Battle of the Atlantic in WWII.	
Focke-Wulf Fw 58	Nazi Germany	1937-1949	15	Maritime patrol	Used to protect the Brazilian coast during the Battle of the Atlantic in WWII.	
Muniz M-7	Brazil	1935-1945	11	Trainer		

== 1940s ==
Aircraft	Origin	Years	Number	Role	Note	Image
Boeing-Stearman	United States	1937-1948	46	Trainer/Maritime Patrol	Used to protect the Brazilian coast during the Battle of the Atlantic in WWII.	
Consolidated Commodore	United States	1940-1942	2	Transport		
Grumman G-44 Widgeon	United States	1942-1958	14	Transport/Maritime observation		
North American NA-16	United States	1942-1965	~20	Ground attack/Maritime Patrol	Used in anti-submarine warfare during the Battle of the Atlantic in WWII.	
Beechcraft Staggerwing	United States	1942-1960	54	Utility aircraft/Maritime Patrol	Used to protect the Brazilian coast during Battle of the Atlantic in WWII.	
Beechcraft Model 18	United States	1943-1952	01	Utility aircraft	Used in National Air Mail service.	
Vultee A-31 Vengeance	United States	1943-1958	33	Ground attack/Maritime Patrol	Used in anti-submarine warfare during the Battle of the Atlantic in WWII.	
Curtiss P-36 Hawk	United States	1942-1946	10	Fighter	Used to protect the Brazilian coast during the Battle of the Atlantic in WWII.	
Curtiss P-40 Warhawk	United States	1944-1958	49	Fighter		
Vultee BT-13 Valiant	United States	1941-1956	120	Trainer/Maritime patrol	Used to protect the Brazilian coast during the Battle of the Atlantic in WWII.	
Consolidated PBY Catalina	United States	1943-1979	22	Maritime patrol/Transport		
Fairchild PT-19	United States	1942-1960	?	Trainer		
Lockheed Model 18 Lodestar	United States	1943-1968	08	Transport/Observation	Used in National Air Mail service.	
Cessna AT-17 Bobcat	United States	1943-1956	39	Transport		
Noorduyn Norseman	Canada	1944-1960	17	Transport		
Douglas A-20 Havoc	United States	1944-1970	31	Light bomber/reconnaissance	Used to protect the Brazilian coast during the Battle of the Atlantic in WWII.	
Lockheed Hudson	United States	1942-1955	27	bomber/reconnaissance	Used to escort naval convoys in the Brazilian coast during the Battle of the Atlantic in WWII.	
Lockheed Ventura	United States	1944-1956	20	Patrol bomber	Used to escort naval convoys in the Brazilian coast during the Battle of the Atlantic in WWII.	
North American B-25 Mitchell	United States	1943-1972	79	Medium bomber/reconnaissance/Maritime Patrol	One B25 of the Brazilian Air Force attacked and damaged a German submarine off the Brazilian coast during the Battle of the Atlantic in WWII.	
Douglas C-47 Skytrain	United States	1943-1985	82	transport aircraft	Played an important role in the National Air Mail, military mail.	
North American T-6 Texan	United States	1944-1985	~100	Trainer/light attack/counter insurgency	Used against guerrillas in the 1970s.	
Piper J-3 Cub	United States	1944-1970	?	Observation	A squadron equipped with Cubs was sent to the Italian front, integrated with Brazilian Expeditionary Force, in WWII.	
Republic P-47 Thunderbolt	United States	1944-1956	85	Fighter/attack	Aviation group sent to the Italian front integrated with the 62nd Fighter Wing, XII Tactical Air Command, of the 12th Air Force in WWII.	
Curtiss C-46 Commando	United States	1948-1983	02	Transport		

== 1950s ==
Aircraft	Origin	Years	Number	Role	Note	Image
Fokker S-11	Netherlands	1953-1975	100	Trainer		
Gloster Meteor	United Kingdom	1952-1972	62	Fighter	First jet aircraft of the Brazilian Air Force.	
Douglas A-26 Invader	United States	1956-1979	32	Light bomber	Attacked positions of the Araguaia guerrilla in the 1970s.	
Boeing B-17 Flying Fortress	United States	1951-1968	13	Maritime Patrol/Search and rescue	Was used in the Lobster War	
Fairchild C-82 Packet	United States	1955-1969	12	Transport/Search and rescue		
Grumman HU-16 Albatross	United States	1958-1980	14	Transport/Search and rescue		
Lockheed P-80 Shooting Star	United States	1958-1973	33	Fighter		
Lockheed T-33	United States	1956-1975	58	Trainer/Fighter		
Sikorsky H-19	United States	1954-1968	06	Utility helicopter		
Beechcraft Bonanza	United States	1950-1960	05	VIP		
Bell 47	United States	1958-1990	49	Trainer		
Cessna O-1 Bird Dog	United States	1957-1980	20	Observation aircraft	Used for observation missions in counterinsurgency operations during Parrot Operation.	
Lockheed P-2 Neptune	United States	1958-1976	14	Anti-submarine warfare/Maritime Patrol	Was used in the Lobster War	
CAP-4 Paulistinha	Brazil	1959-1975	~50	Trainer/Observation		

== 1960s ==
Aircraft	Origin	Years	Number	Role	Note	Image
Vickers Viscount 700 / VC-90	United Kingdom	1956-1971	12	Government Transport	Used in the GTE - Grupo de Transporte Especial - Special Transport Group.	
Fairchild C-119 Flying Boxcar	United States	1962-1975	13	Transport		
Sikorsky H-34	United States	1962-1968	06	Anti-submarine warfare		
Grumman S-2 Tracker	United States	1961-1996	21	Anti-submarine warfare	Was used in the Lobster War. They operated from the aircraft carrier NAeL Minas Gerais.	
Hawker Siddeley HS 748	United Kingdom	1962-2005	12	Transport		
Morane-Saulnier MS.760 Paris	France	1962-1980	30	Trainer aircraft		
Cessna T-37 Tweet	United States	1968-1978	65	Trainer aircraft		
Fouga CM.170 Magister	France	1968-1975	07	Trainer	Used the Fouga Magister in their aerobatic display team, the Smoke Squadron.	
DHC-5 Buffalo	Canada	1968-2004	24	Transport		
Aerotec Uirapuru	Brazil	1968-1980	~100	Trainer		
BAC One-Eleven	United Kingdom	1968-1976	02	VIP		
Douglas DC-6	United States	1968-1978	05	Transport	Used in military mail.	

== 1970s- ==
Aircraft	Origin	Years	Number	Role	Note	Image
Neiva Regente	Brazil	1970-2010	~80	Utility transport/Observation		
EMBRAER AT-26 Xavante	Brazil/Italy	1971-2010	182	Advanced trainer/Light attack/reconnaissance	Multifunctional jet produced nationally, was the main ground attack aircraft during the 1980s.	
Dassault Mirage III	France	1972-2005	32	Interceptor aircraft	First supersonic aircraft of the Brazilian Air Force, the Mirage III fighters belonged to the 1st. Group Air Defense (1st GAD), located at the Anápolis Air Base in Goiás.	
Boeing 737	United States	1972-2010	02	VIP		
Boeing 707	United States	1972-2012	04	Aerial refuelling and transport		
Bell 206	United States	1973-2010	04	VIP		
Northrop F-5	United States	1975–Present Day	57	Fighter/Interceptor	11 bought from Jordan in 2009	F-5 Tiger II
Hawker Siddeley VU-93	United Kingdom	1977-2009	06	VIP		
Embraer KC-390	Brazil	2015	28	aerial refueling, transport cargo and troops	28 ordered. To be delivered from 2015 to 2016.	
EMBRAER A-29 Super Tucano	Brazil	2004	100	light attack		
Lockheed P-3 Orion	United States	2010	12	Maritime patrol aircraft		
Sikorsky UH-60 Blackhawk	United States	1997	16	combat SAR / search and rescue	fifteen requested	
Embraer R-99	Brazil	2002	5	Airborne early warning and control		
AMX International A-1M	Brazil	1989	53	Ground attack aircraft	modernized to A-1M, delivered between 2013 and 2017, and to be retired in 2032	
Mil Mi-24	Russia	2008	12	attack helicopter		
SAAB Gripen NG	Sweden	2018	36	air superiority fighter	a contract for 36 Gripen NG fighters is expected to be finalised in 10–12 months. According to Saab, Brazil is expected to order 28 single-seat (Gripen E) and 8 twin-seat (Gripen F) fighters.	
Eurocopter EC 725	United Kingdom	2014	18	transport helicopter		
EADS CASA C-295	Spain	?	12	transport		
HeliBras HB.355F Esquilo Bi	France/Brazil	1980-2013	10	Utility helicopter	4 were donated to the Military Police of Rio de Janeiro State.	
Aérospatiale SA 330 Puma	France	1981-1986	06	Utility helicopter		
Atlas Impala	South Africa	2005-2010	12	Light attack		
Dassault Mirage 2000	France	2006-2013	12	Fighter		

== See also ==
- Brazilian Air Force
- List of active Brazilian military aircraft
