= Neiva Campeiro =

Campeiro

General information
- Type: Utility monoplane
- National origin: Brazil
- Manufacturer: Neiva
- Primary user: Brazilian Air Force
- Number built: 20

History
- Developed from: Neiva Paulistinha 56

The Neiva Campeiro is a Brazilian two-seat utility monoplane built by Indústria Aeronáutica Neiva for the Brazilian Air Force. The Campeiro was based on the earlier Neiva Paulistinha 56 with a re-designed structure and powered by a 150 hp (112 kW) Avco Lycoming O-320-A piston engine. The Camperiro was a braced high-wing monoplane with a fixed tailwheel landing gear. Twenty aircraft were built for the Brazilian Air Force as the L-7 Campeiro and were used for liaison, observation, rescue and training.

== Operators ==
Brazil

- Brazilian Air Force

== Specifications ==
Data from

General characteristics

- Crew: 2
- Length: 6.90 m (22 ft 3.75 in)
- Wingspan: 10.70 m (35 ft 1.25 in)
- Height: 2.65 m (8 ft 8.25 in)
- Wing area: 16.80 m^{2} (18.84 sq ft)
- Empty weight: 491 kg (1,082 lb)
- Gross weight: 790 kg (1,741 lb)
- Powerplant: 1 × Avco Lycoming O-320-A flat-four piston engine , 112 kW (150 hp)

Performance

- Maximum speed: 215 km/h (134 mph, 116 kn)
- Range: 955 km (535 mi, 465 nmi)

== See also ==
Related development

- Neiva Paulistinha 56
