= Patrulha Aérea Civil =

Patrulha Aérea Civil PAC-BRASIL
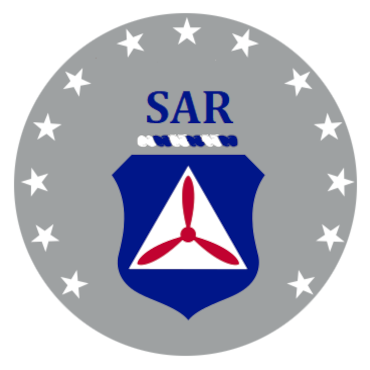
- Seal of the Patrulha Aérea Civil
- Founded: 16 April 1959; 67 years ago
- Country: Brazil
- Branch: Brazilian Air Force
- Type: Civilian auxiliary
- Role: Search and rescue; Disaster relief; Aerospace education; Cadet programs

Patrulha Aérea Civil (PAC) - "Civil Air Patrol" in Portuguese, is a nonprofit corporation, congressionally chartered by the (1213/1959) law, supported by the federal government, serving as a civilian auxiliary of the Brazilian Air Force.

== History ==
The "Patrulha Aérea Civil" was conceived in the late 1950s with strong influence from the "Civil Air Patrol" which has existed in the United States since the 1930s and officially created in December 1941.

Brazilian Air Force officials who visited CAP-USA ("Civil Air Patrol") envisioned the usefulness of a similar organization in Brazil, filling a gap in search and rescue. At the time, they received support from politicians, the press, the military, airmen and journalists.

"PAC-BRASIL" was created under the authorization of the Ministry of Aeronautics at the time Francisco de Assis Correia de Melo and having as its founders the Air Force Officers Brig. Gen. Alfredo Gonçalves Correia "in memorian", and Lt. Col. Antônio da Costa Faria "in memorian", members of the "Department of Civil Aviation" (DAC), in the then capital of the "Republic of the United States of Brazil", Rio de Janeiro.

Important missions were assigned to "PAC-BRASIL", such as developing and supporting flying clubs in the country, supporting Santos Dumond Foundation, supporting the creation of Aeronautics Museum (today Museu Aeroespacial), and disseminate aeronautical knowledge, search and rescue missions, air patrolling, among many others.

In a few months, "PAC-BRASIL" had a queue for enlisting volunteers throughout Brazil. In the 1960s, the PAC had a body of 100,000 members nationwide.

== See also ==
- Civil Air Patrol - American counterpart
- National security
- Civil defense
- Royal Canadian Air Cadets
