= Interstate Aircraft =

Interstate Aircraft and Engineering Corporation
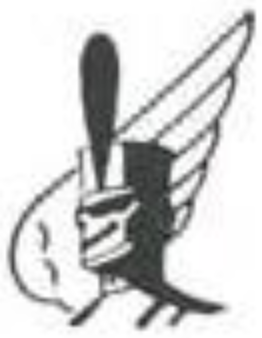

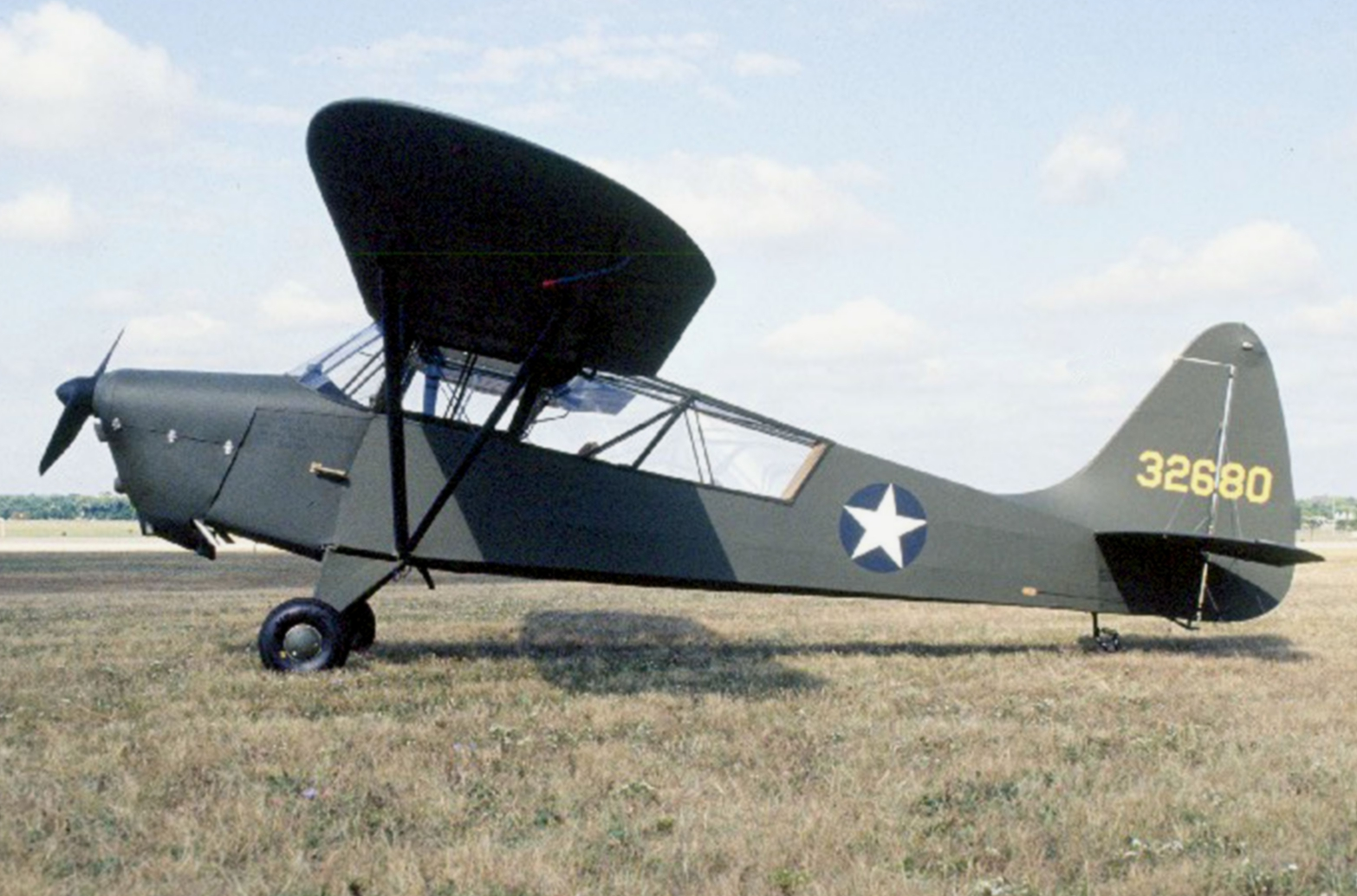
- Interstate L-6A (s/n 43-2680) of the National Museum of the United States Air Force, in Dayton, Ohio
- Industry: Aerospace
- Founded: 1937
- Key people: Don P. Smith

Interstate Aircraft and Engineering Corporation was a small American aircraft manufacturer in production from April 1937 to 1945, based in El Segundo, California.

== History ==
Originally known as Interstate Engineering, the company became the Interstate Aircraft and Engineering Corporation around July 1937. A new aircraft plant was built adjacent to Los Angeles Municipal Airport and operations began there the same month. In August 1938, Don P. Smith became president and by mid-1939 the company had 100 employees. In a 1940 court case, the National Labor Relations Board decided against the company, ordering it to stop discriminating against employees who joined the United Automobile Workers union.

A few months later, the company developed the Cadet, a 2-seat monoplane, with production beginning in July. The Model S-1B was developed into the XO-63, later redesignated to the XL-6. A total of 259 of the XO-63/L-6/L-8 series were built for the US Army Air Forces. Plans called for an annual production of 900 aircraft. This expected increase was enabled in part by the company's "Fabri-Clip" invention, which allowed the fabric skin of an airplane to be attached in much less time than traditional methods.

The company also manufactured a trainer for the US Navy which was developed in only nine months, from the first blueprints to first flight of the prototype. The company also manufactured bomb shackles, machine gun and cannon chargers, hydraulic actuators, and other aircraft components. There were also plans for a larger version of the Cadet with side-by-side seating and a four seat twin engine airplane that was claimed to be the "world's smallest". By November 1941, the company was employing 22 deaf and mute workers.

In 1945, after manufacturing over 700 light aircraft, Interstate sold its line of aircraft to the Harlow Aircraft Company, as the company had decided to focus on the production of appliances. The following year, the company changed its name to Interstate Engineering to reflect the change in business strategy. However, within a few years, Interstate also began producing helicopter fuselages for United Helicopters, Inc. of Palo Alto, California, and had contracts with Douglas Aircraft Company, the US Navy and US Air Force.

Interstate Engineering moved to Anaheim, California in the mid-1950s, was acquired by Figgie International in 1967, and sold to Engles Urso Capital Corporation in 1996.

Harlow Aircraft sold the manufacturing rights for the Cadet aircraft to Call Aircraft Company of Afton, Wyoming, in 1945. In the 1960s, newly formed Arctic Aircraft purchased the rights, and currently produces an upgraded version of the aircraft as the Arctic Tern.

== Aircraft ==
Model name	First flight	Number built	Type
Interstate S-1 Cadet	1940	574	Utility monoplane
Interstate TDR	1942	195	Flying bomb
Interstate XBDR	N/A	0	Flying bomb

== See also ==
- List of military aircraft of the United States
- California during World War II
