= Cap 1 =

Cap 1 may refer to:

- CAP1, Adenylyl cyclase-associated protein 1, an enzyme that in humans is encoded by the CAP1 gene
- CAP-1 Planalto, an aircraft
- Capital One Financial Corporation
- Captain America: The First Avenger, a 2011 film
