= TAM Museum =

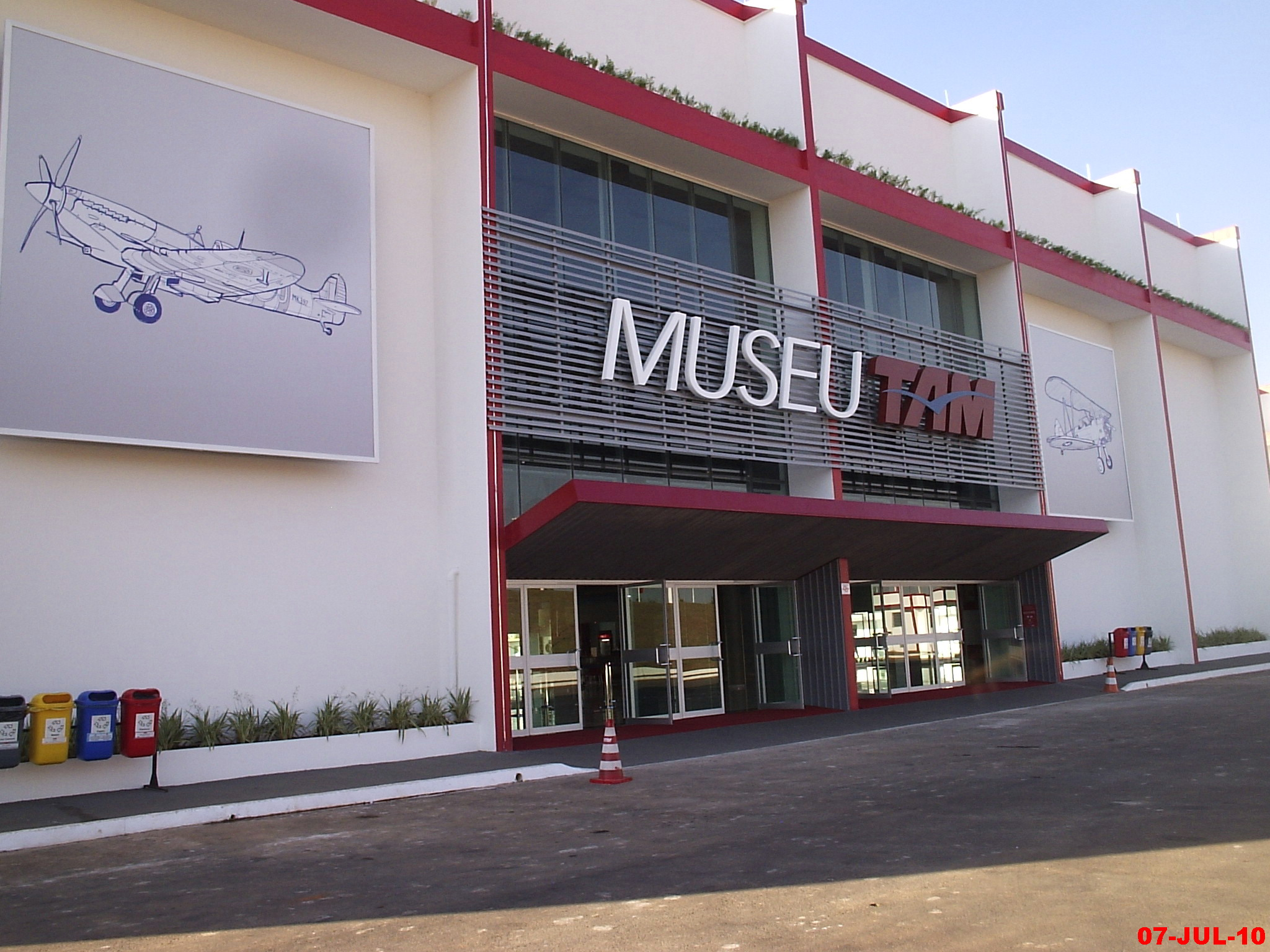
- Entrance

- Location within Brazil
- Established: 11 November 2006
- Location: São Carlos, São Paulo, Brazil
- Coordinates: 21°52′35″S 47°54′12″W
- Type: Aviation museum
- Website: www.asasdeumsonho.com.br

The TAM Museum (Portuguese: Museu TAM), also known as the Museu Asas de um Sonho (Wings of a Dream Museum), is an aviation museum located 15 kilometers (9.3 mi) from central city São Carlos, and 250 kilometers (160 mi) from São Paulo City within the state of São Paulo, Brazil.

The museum was the creation of Rolim Adolfo Amaro, founder and president of TAM Airlines, and his brother João Francisco Amaro. The building is adjacent to the TAM Airlines Technology Center at São Carlos Airport, in the district of Água Vermelha in São Carlos.

== History ==
In 1996, after finishing the restoration work on a Cessna 195, brothers Rolim Adolfo Amaro and João Francisco Amaro decided to buy some classic aircraft, and keep them near São Paulo, in order to make them available for flights on weekends with friends. Realising the small collection could form the basis of an aviation history museum, the brothers then decided to create the "Museu Asas de um Sonho" (Wings of a Dream Museum). It was maintained by the Education Service and Culture, a non-profit association founded by TAM on 23 December 1991, to administer the social programs of the company.

In 2006, the museum opened with 32 aircraft and was intended to have more than 80 aircraft. The opening was part of the celebrations of 150 years of the city of São Carlos.

In July 2008, the museum was closed to visitors in order to allow a complete reorganization of its installations, which included an expansion of the covered space from 9.5 thousand square metres to over 20 thousand square metres. The grand re-opening occurred in June 2010 and among the collection of 90 airplanes, held the sole surviving S.55 seaplane christened "Jahú", a F4U Corsair, a Bf 109, a Dassault Mirage III, a Brazilian aircraft Neiva Regente.

On January 29, 2016, TAM announced that the museum would be ceasing operations due to budget concerns. Closure actually happened on February 2, 2016, and on May 18, 2018, it was announced that it would be relocated close to the Brazilian Aerospace Memorial at São José dos Campos Airport, near the Embraer plant, but this never happened.

On December 16, 2019, the president of the Brazilian Aviation Institute (IBA), Francisco Lyra, announced to an audience at the opening of the São Paulo Catarina business aviation airport that his next project would be to preserve the "Asas de um Sonho" aviation museum. It was intended by the follower Latam Airlines Group to postpone the acerve to Campo de Marte Airport, which also never happened.

In March 2022, it was mistakenly reported that the museum pieces had been acquired by Helisul, an air taxi company, and would be displayed at the Foz do Iguaçu Convention Center. However, the company denied the purchase, although it did not rule out the possibility of a future partnership.

Finally, in May 2023, the museum was reopened on the original location in São Carlos. However, it soon closed again.

Then, in 2024, it was revealed that Marcos Amaro, owner of Museum, was planning to transfer its pieces to Itú.

In 2025, it was announced that 80 aircraft will be transferred to a proposed Museu Aeroespacial Paulista, located in the Parque de Material Aeronáutico area at Campo de Marte Airport in São Paulo. The new museum will be a joint venture between the Brazilian Air Force and the Museu Asas de um Sonho and will cost R$350 million. The first three aircraft were ceremonially transferred to the Brazilian Air Force in June.

== Collection ==
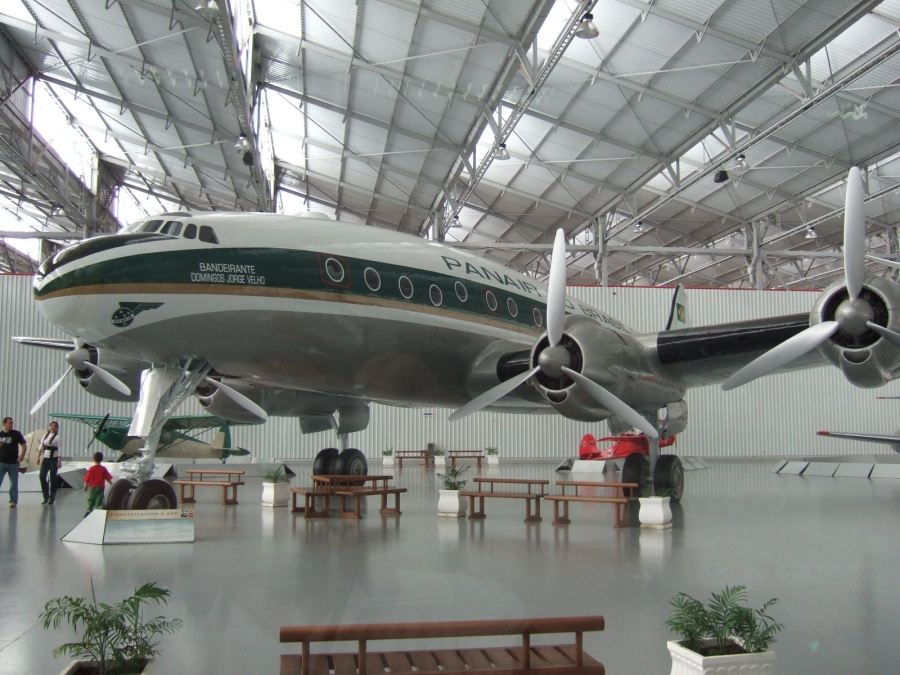
Lockheed 049 Constellation

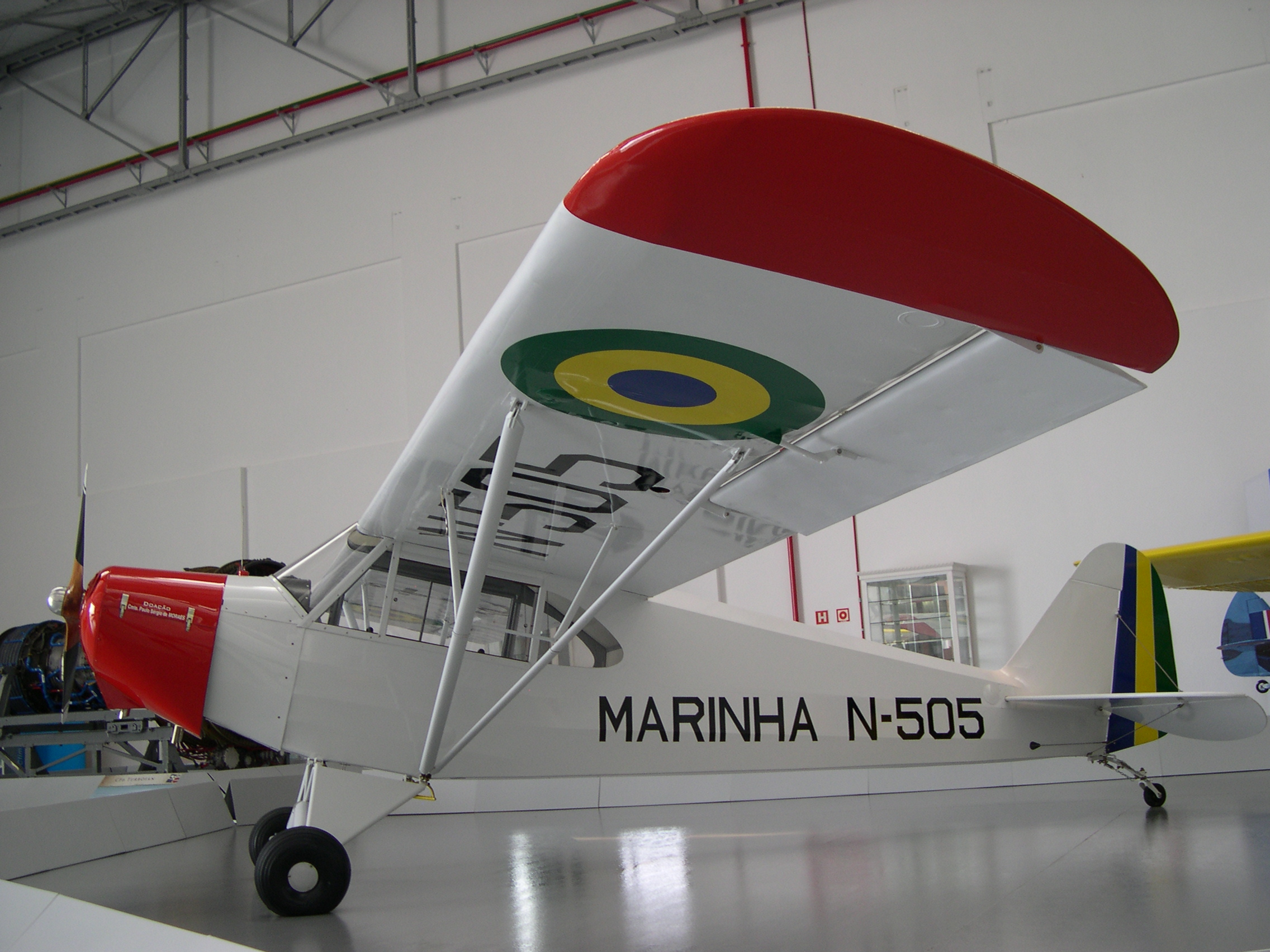
CAP-4 Paulistinha

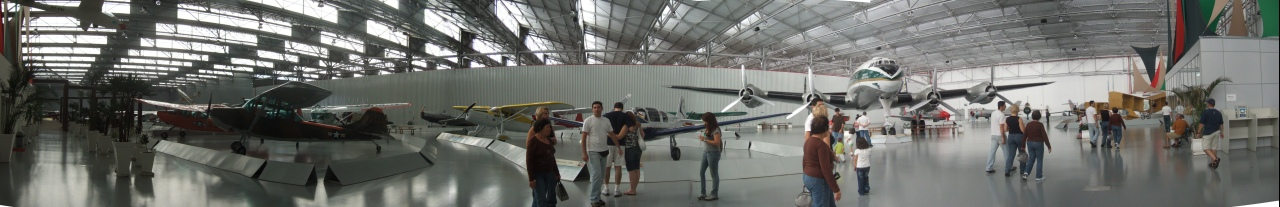
Panorama

Source: Ogden

The museum has more than 35 aircraft in a historical building measuring 450 metres long by 130 metres wide and 11 metres high. The exhibits planned to be accessible to visitors in 2010 were as follows:

Designation	Identity	Notes
Aeronca C-3	NC14630	
Boeing-Stearman Model 75	LV-FGD	
Bücker Bü 131 Jungmann	E3B-595	
Cessna 140	PP-DYX	
Cessna 180	PT-BXZ	
Cessna 185	PT-KJM	
Cessna 195	PT-LDK	
Cessna L-19 Bird Dog	54736	
Cessna L-19 Bird Dog	62612	
Cessna L-19 Bird Dog	72774	
Douglas DC-3	N101KC	"Rose"
EAY Ypiranga	PT-ZGY	
Embraer EMB 110 Bandeirante TAM		
Fairchild UC-61A	2687	
Fairchild PT-19 Cornell	PP-GAY	
Fokker F27 Friendship TAM		
Gloster Meteor F.8	4440	
Lockheed 049 Constellation	PP-PDD	Bought in Paraguay and painted as Panair do Brasil
Messerschmitt Bf 109 G-2	12456	
Mikoyan-Gurevich MiG-15	6247	
Mikoyan-Gurevich MiG-17	23	
Mikoyan-Gurevich MiG-21	17	
Miles M.2H Hawk Major	G-ADAS	
Neiva CAP-4 Paulistinha	N-505	Marinha
Nord 1203 Norécrin	PP-EBE	
Republic P-47D Thunderbolt	229265	
Piper PA-12 Super Cruiser		
IPE Quero Quero KW.1	PT-PEI	Sailplane
IPE Quero Quero KW.1	PT-PFJ	Sailplane
RWD-13	PT-LFY	
Santos-Dumont 14-bis		Replica
Santos-Dumont Demoiselle		Replica
Savoia-Marchetti S.55	I-BAUQ	"Jahú"
Schneider Grunau Baby IIb		Glider
Supermarine Spitfire Mk.IX	EN398	
Universal Flea Ship	PP-TKX	
Vought F4U Corsair	17-F-13	

== See also ==
- List of aerospace museums
