= PV-2 =

PV-2 or PV2 may refer to:

- Piasecki PV-2, Frank Piasecki's first helicopter
- Lockheed PV-2 Harpoon, a World War II Naval Patrol aircraft
- PV-2 machine gun - A Soviet machine gun of the 1920s and 1930s used on aircraft.
- PV-2 (serotype) - A serotype of poliovirus.
