= Interstate Cadet =

1940 utility aircraft family

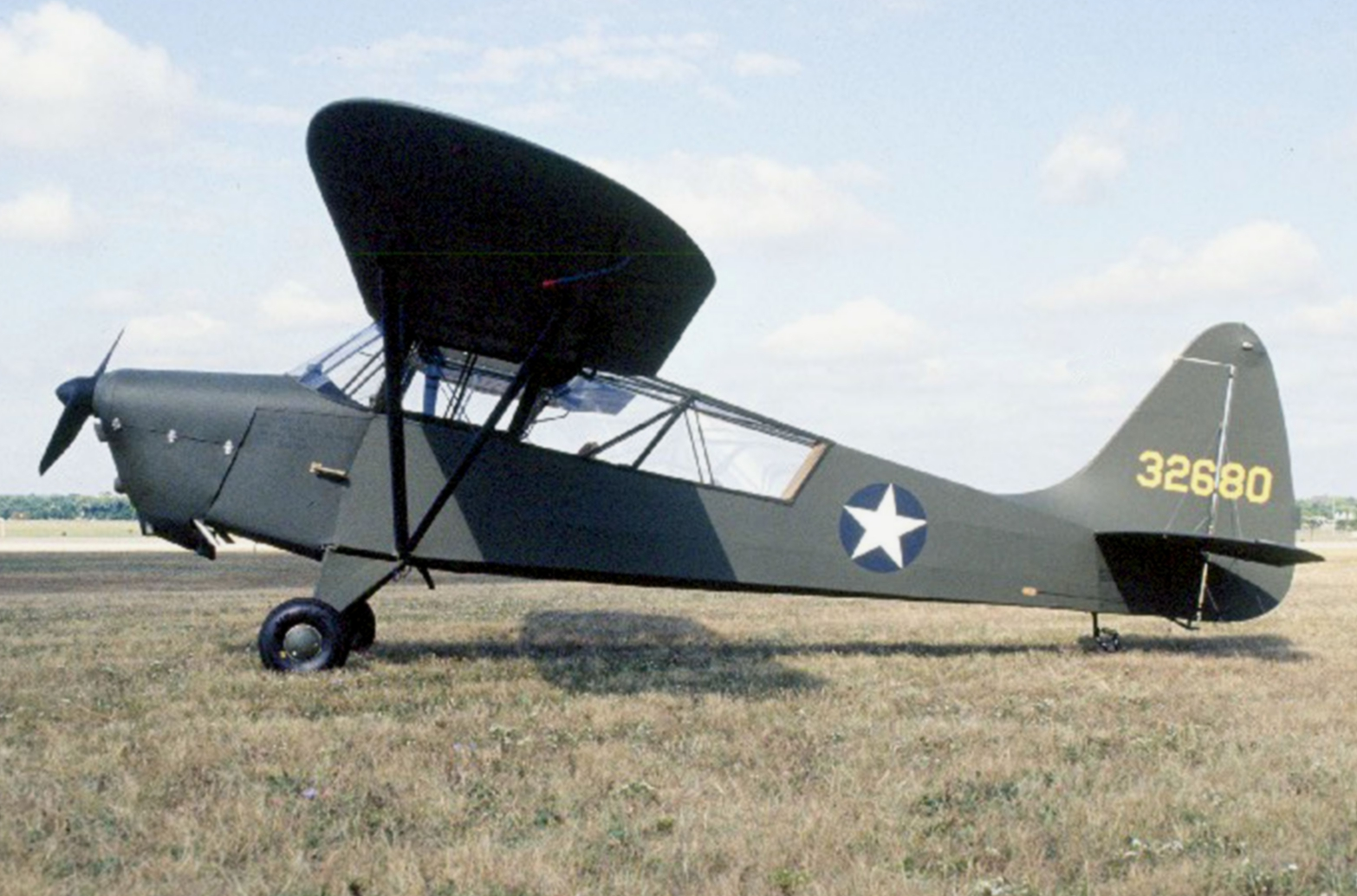
- An L-6 of the USAF Museum

General information
- Type: Utility monoplane
- National origin: United States
- Manufacturer: Interstate Aircraft and Engineering Corporation
- Primary user: United States Army
- Number built: 574

History
- First flight: 1940
- Variant: Arctic Tern

The Interstate Cadet is an American two-seat tandem, high wing, single-engine monoplane light aircraft. Around 320 of these aircraft were produced between the years 1941 and 1942 by the Interstate Aircraft and Engineering Corporation based in El Segundo, California. The construction techniques employed were a welded steel tube fuselage, wood (spruce) wing structure with metal ribs, and fabric covering, all of which were fairly standard in the 1940s.

An Interstate Cadet, flown by aviator Cornelia Fort and her student Mr. Suomala, was one of the first aircraft (if not the first) to be attacked by IJNAS Japanese naval planes en route to the Pearl Harbor attack on December 7, 1941.

== Design and development ==
The original version, the S-1 prototype, was powered by the 50 hp Continental A50 engine, but was soon upgraded to the Continental A65 engine and redesignated as the S-1A-65F. This was a common engine used in many small American two-seat aircraft of the time. This aircraft would be used during World War II under the L-6A designation.

In 1945 the rights to the aircraft were sold to Harlow Aircraft Company, which in turn resold the tooling and parts to the Call Aircraft Company of Afton, Wyoming in 1946 for $5,000 ($83,000 in 2025). Callair rebuilt a number of S-1, S-1A and L-6s, some with engine upgrades, for local ranchers and bush pilots as well as two examples of their own serial numbered CallAir S-1A-90C before stopping production, focusing instead on variations of its original CallAir Model A (which also sold in small numbers, fewer than 200 total units).

One reason the Cadet may not have sold well was that this aircraft cost almost three times the amount of the comparable Piper J-3 Cub. However, a close look at the two aircraft reveals that the Cadet was faster, stronger, and could be operated in a more rugged environment with its Oleo strut/Compression spring suspension system. Popular upgrades for this airframe included larger engines(75/85/90/100 hp), better brakes, and a different tailwheel system.

In the late 1960s the type certificates and tooling were bought by the newly formed Arctic Aircraft Company who transformed the S-1B1 into a bush plane by upgrading structural elements of the fuselage, landing gear and wings. This aircraft was designated the S-1B2, was used a Lycoming O-320 160 HP engine and a McCauley propeller for increased performance and was certified in 1975 as the Arctic Tern. The new Type certification also covered installing the same engine in otherwise standard Interstate Cadets.

== Variants ==
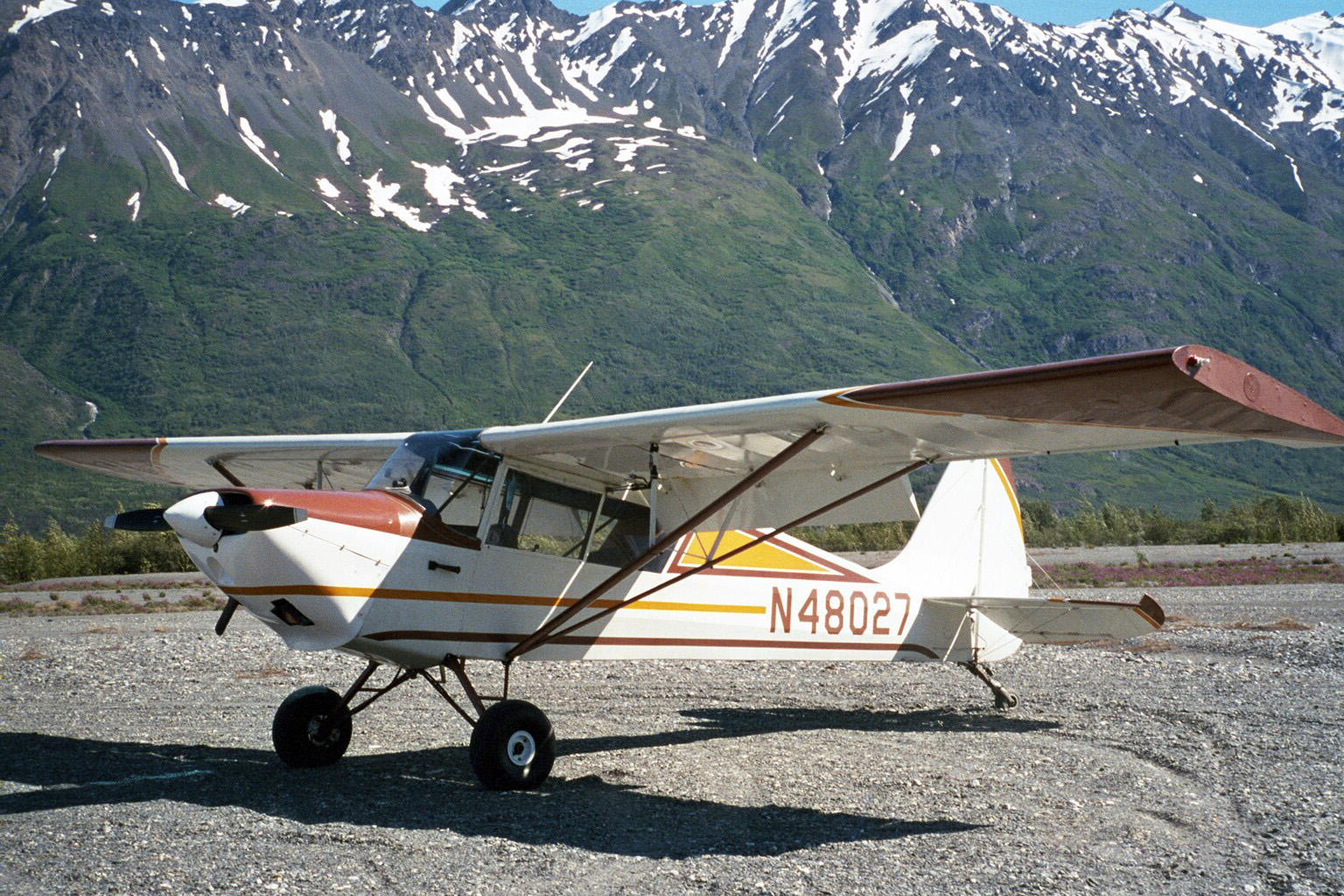
A later S-1B2 Arctic Tern

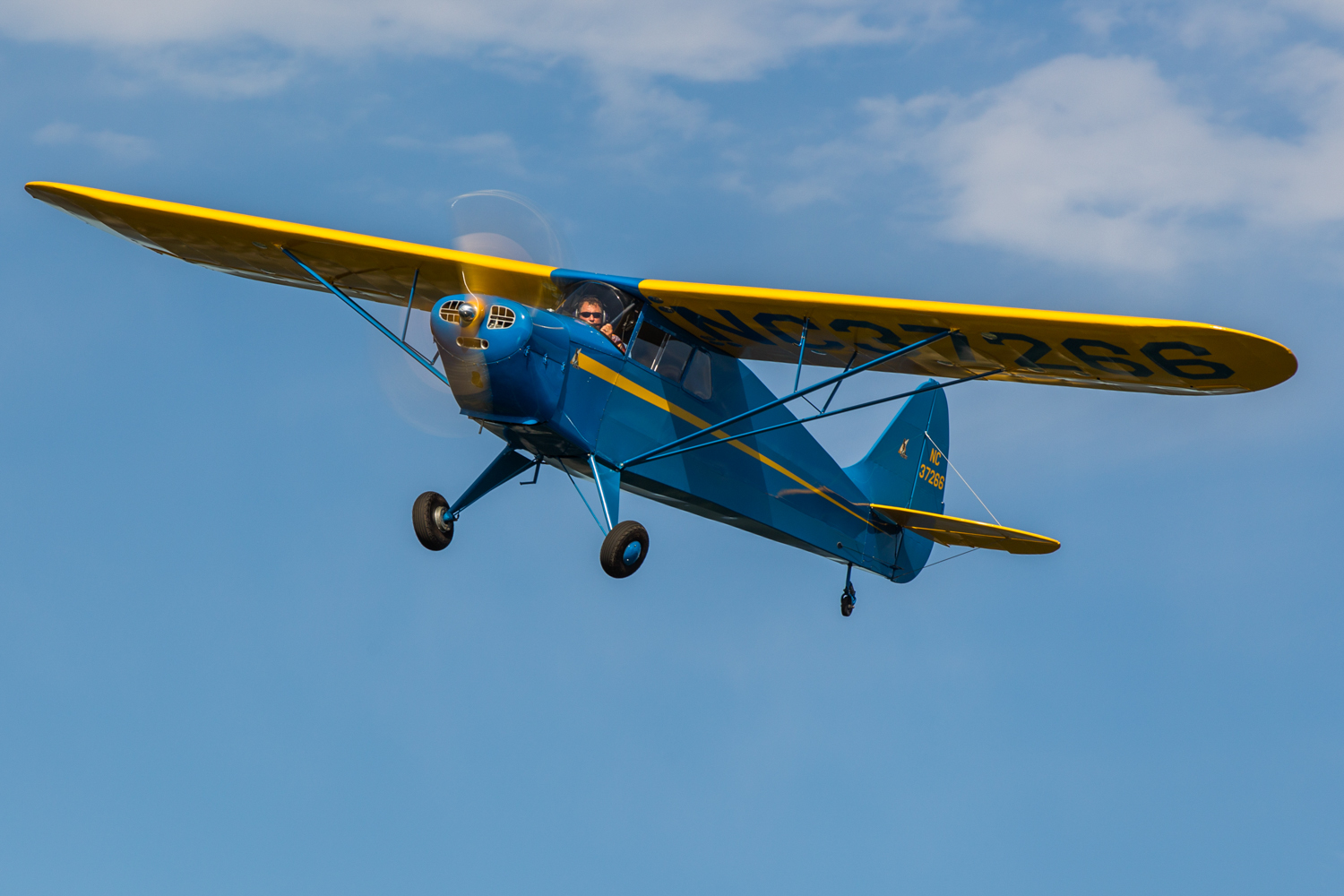
Interstate Cadet S-1A

S-1
Certified in 1940 and powered by a Continental A50-8 engine.
S-1A
Certified in 1941 and powered by a Continental A65-8 engine.
S-1A-65F
1941 variant powered by a 65hp Franklin 4AC-176-B2 engine.
S-1A-85F
1942 variant powered by an 85hp Franklin 4AC-199-D2 engine.
S-1A-90C
1952 Callair variant powered by a 90hp Continental C90-8 engine.only two built.
S-1A-90F
1942 variant powered by 90hp Franklin 4AC-199-E2 engine.
S-1B1
1942 variant with a Franklin 4ACG-199-H3 engine. Military production as the L-6 Grasshopper.
S-1B2 (Arctic Tern)
1975 improved variant of the S-1B1 powered by a Lycoming O-320-A2B or B2B engine.
XO-63 Grasshopper
United States Army designation for one S-1B for evaluation, later designated the XL-6.
L-6 Grasshopper
United States Army designation for the S-1B1, 250 built.
L-8A Cadet
United States Army designation for eight S-1As ordered on behalf of the Bolivian Air Force.

== Specifications (S-1A) ==
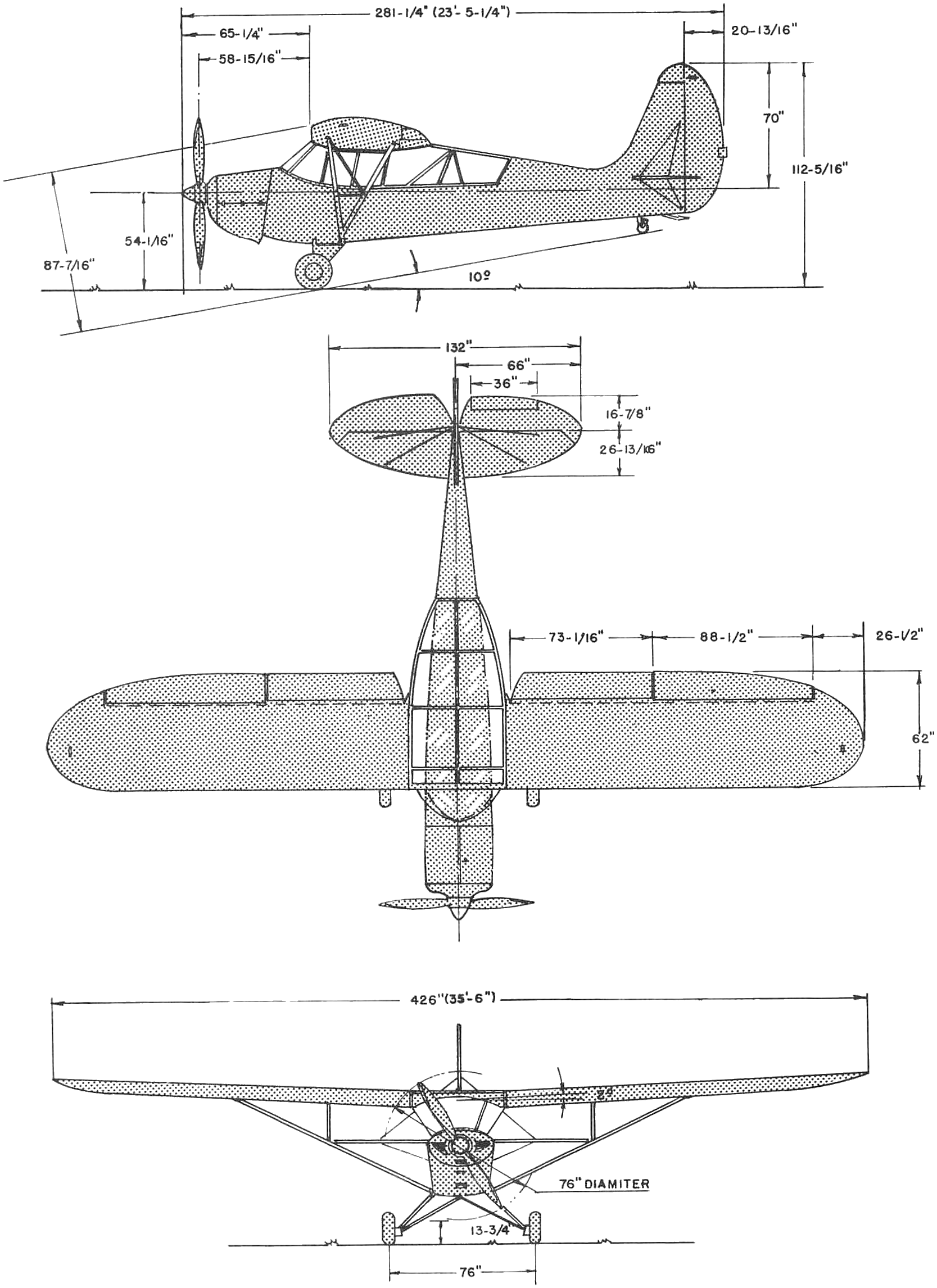
3-view line drawing of the Interstate L-6

Data from U.S. Civil Aircraft: Vol. 8

General characteristics

- Crew: two
- Length: 24 ft 0 in (7.32 m)
- Wingspan: 35 ft 6 in (10.82 m)
- Height: 7 ft 3 in (2.21 m)
- Wing area: 173.8 sq ft (16.15 m^{2})
- Airfoil: NACA 23012
- Empty weight: 720 lb (327 kg)
- Gross weight: 1,200 lb (544 kg)
- Fuel capacity: 15 US gal (12 imp gal; 57 L)
- Powerplant: 1 × Continental A65-8 air-cooled flat-four, 65 hp (48 kW)

Performance

- Maximum speed: 107 mph (172 km/h, 93 kn)
- Cruise speed: 98 mph (158 km/h, 85 kn) (80% power)
- Stall speed: 36 mph (58 km/h, 31 kn)
- Range: 350 mi (560 km, 300 nmi)
- Service ceiling: 14,500 ft (4,400 m)
- Rate of climb: 625 ft/min (3.18 m/s)

== See also ==
Related development

- Arctic Tern

Related lists

- List of aircraft of World War II
- List of military aircraft of the United States
