= IPT-16 Surubim =

Brazilian single engined experimental light aircraft

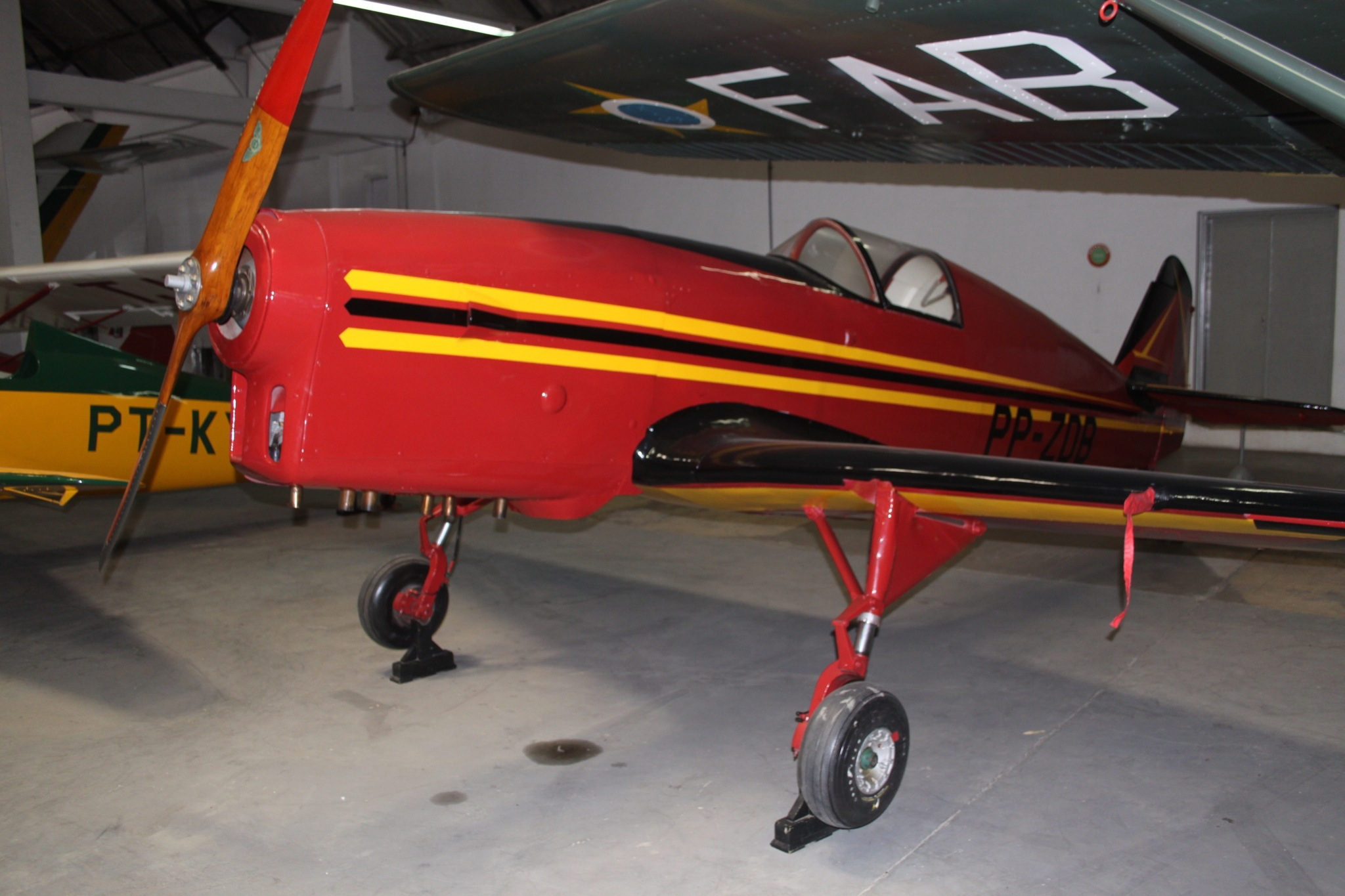

General information
- Type: Aerobatic aircraft
- National origin: Brazil
- Manufacturer: Instituto de Pesquisas Tecnologicas
- Designer: Joseph Kovács
- Number built: 1

History
- First flight: 17 September 1959

The IPT-16 Surubim was a Brazilian single-seat, single engined experimental light aircraft. A single example was built and flown in 1959.

== Design and development ==
In 1949, Joseph Kovács, a Hungarian-born aircraft engineer working at the Instituto de Pesquisas Tecnologicas (IPT - Institute of Technical Research) of the University of São Paulo proposed to design and build an experimental high performance light aircraft powered by a surplus Hirth HM 506 engine that had been imported into Brazil before the Second World War for use in an unbuilt aircraft design. The IPT, however, was busy on other projects, and so did not back Kovács' proposed design. Kovács, with fellow IPT engineer Sylvio de Oliveira, started construction of the design, named "Surubim" (little devil), in a rented workshop.

The Surubim was a low-winged monoplane with a retractable tailwheel undercarriage of all wooden construction with plywood skinning, using Brazilian Pine and Freijo, two indigenous woods. The wings were fitted with trailing edge flaps and fixed leading edge slots. The pilot sat in an enclosed cockpit.

When Kovács left IPT in 1951, de Oliveira continued work on the prototype, which was acquired by the IPT in 1953 for use as a flying test bed, gaining the designation IPT-16. Construction of the prototype continued at a slow pace, with the prototype being shown at an exhibition in São Paulo in 1956, but remained unflown for several more years.

== Operational history ==
The IPT-16 finally made its maiden flight on 17 September 1959. Despite being underpowered and using a fixed pitch wooden propeller, performance was good, reaching a level speed of 340 km/h (210 mph) and 500 km/h (310 mph) in a dive. It was used by the IPT for three years, after which it was transferred to the Rio Claro City Aero Club for use as an aerobatic aircraft, where it remained in use until at least 1977.

It was presented to the Museu Aeroespacial at Rio de Janeiro in 1988, where, after restoration, it was put on display.

== Specifications ==
Data from Jane's All the World's Aircraft 1958-59, Brazilian 'Little Devil', Jane's All the World's Aircraft 1953-54

General characteristics

- Crew: 1
- Length: 6.95 m (22 ft 10 in)
- Wingspan: 7.70 m (25 ft 3 in)
- Height: 2.1 m (6 ft 11 in)
- Wing area: 7.70 m^{2} (82.9 sq ft)
- Aspect ratio: 7.4
- Empty weight: 440 kg (970 lb)
- Gross weight: 640 kg (1,411 lb)
- Fuel capacity: 120 L (26 imp gal; 32 US gal)
- Powerplant: 1 × Hirth HM 506A 6-cylinder air-cooled inverted inline, 120 kW (160 hp)
- Propellers: 2-bladed wooden propeller

Performance

- Maximum speed: 340 km/h (210 mph, 180 kn)
- Cruise speed: 300 km/h (190 mph, 160 kn)
- Stall speed: 90 km/h (56 mph, 49 kn)
- Range: 1,050 km (650 mi, 570 nmi)
- Endurance: 3 hours 30 minutes
- Wing loading: 80.5 kg/m^{2} (16.5 lb/sq ft)
- Power/mass: 0.1868 kW/kg (0.1136 hp/lb)
