= IPT-7 Junior =

- The IPT-7, at Campo de Marte airport, in 1945.

General information
- Type: Experimental aircraft
- National origin: Brazil
- Manufacturer: Instituto de Pesquisas Tecnologicas
- Designer: Frederico Abranches Brotero
- Number built: 1

History
- First flight: 1945

The IPT-7 Junior was a light aircraft manufactured by the Brazilian Instituto de Pesquisas Tecnologicas (IPT).

== Design and development ==
Frederico A. Brotero, a chief-engineer at the Instituto de Pesquisas Tecnologicas, designed a light multirole aircraft that first flew in 1945. The IPT-7 was designed as a low-wing monoplane with fixed tailwheel landing gear and had a conventional tailplane. The fuselage and wings were of freijó wooden construction, which was planked with plywood made from domestic timbers. The pilot and passenger sat side by side in the cockpit, which could be entered through a sliding canopy. The aircraft was powered by a Franklin 4AC with 48 kW. Despite good flight characteristics, no series production took place.

== Specifications ==
Data from Pereira 1986, p. 126

General characteristics

- Crew: 2
- Length: 6.88 m (22 ft 7 in)
- Wingspan: 10.60 m (34 ft 9 in)
- Height: 2.45 m (8 ft 0 in)
- Wing area: 14.47 m^{2} (155.8 sq ft)
- Empty weight: 396 kg (873 lb)
- Gross weight: 590 kg (1,301 lb)
- Powerplant: 1 × Franklin 4AC-176-BA2 4-cylinder, 48 kW (65 hp)
- Propellers: 2-bladed IPT.9

Performance

- Maximum speed: 144 km/h (89 mph, 78 kn)
- Cruise speed: 135 km/h (84 mph, 73 kn)
- Stall speed: 60 km/h (37 mph, 32 kn)
- Service ceiling: 3,300 m (10,800 ft)
- Rate of climb: 1.4 m/s (280 ft/min)

== See also ==
- CAP-5 Carioca
- CNNA HL-6
- IMPA Tu-Sa

Aircraft of comparable role, configuration, and era

- Hitachi T.2
- LWD Żak
