= IPT-0 Bichinho =

Brazilian aircraft

- Anésio Amaral in the first Bichinho, over Rio Claro, São Paulo, 1941.

General information
- Type: Aerobatic aircraft
- National origin: Brazil
- Manufacturer: Instituto de Pesquisas Tecnologicas
- Designer: Frederico Brotero; Orthon Hoover
- Number built: 4

History
- First flight: 1940

The IPT-0 Bichinho was a Brazilian single-seat, single engined experimental sports aircraft.

== Design and development ==
When Frederico Brotero took over the Seção de Aeronáutica(in English: Aeronautics Section) of IPT(Instituto de Pesquisas Tecnológicas), encouraged the creation of several aeronautics projects, and gave continuity to others that were stopped, one of them was the IPT-0 Bichino that was redrawn. The name Bichinho(in English: Little Warm) came from the idea of making the smallest plane possible.

Brotero employed various construction techniques on this aircraft, it was built using freijó and pinho, with pointed wings, with hypersupportive aerodynamic edges on the leading edge. This type of wing eventually became a signature feature in all subsequent IPT aircraft. It was a monoplace, wooden airplane, externally covered with plywood and canvas, conventional fixed landing gear.

Tests with the first prototype showed structural flaws, which had been solved in the other variants, a transparent canopy was also added.

== Variants ==
IPT-0A Bichinho
It was similar to its predecessor, but with an open cockpit and a modified nose to receive the Continental 4-cylinder 65 HP engine, and a fixed-pitch, domestically-manufactured two-bladed propeller. The landing gear was not fairing. It flew for two years until disassembled for structural tests. A prototype built.
IPT-0B Bichinho
It began construction in 1943, had a Continental 4-cylinder 75 HP engine. It was heavier than its predecessors, however it had superior performance. To improve cooling the fairing left the cylinders exposed. It was used for three years by IPT, until it was donated to an airclub in the region of Rio Claro, where it remained in use until 1988, when it was given to the Museu Aeroespacial. Only one built.
IPT-0C Bichinho
The fourth and last prototype built, clustered similarly to the others. It started to be built in 1943 and was completed in 1944. It had a Continental 4-cylinder 85 HP engine. It had a transparent canopy which slid backwards. After testing it was disassembled.

== Specifications (IPT-0 Bichinho) ==
Data from Pereira, 1986

General characteristics

- Crew: 1
- Length: 5.90 m (19 ft 4 in)
- Wingspan: 6.80 m (22 ft 4 in)
- Height: 1.60 m (5 ft 3 in)
- Wing area: 6.20 m^{2} (66.7 sq ft)
- Empty weight: 280 kg (617 lb)
- Gross weight: 440 kg (970 lb)
- Fuel capacity: 60 L (16 US gal; 13 imp gal)
- Powerplant: 1 × Mikron II inline engine, 48 kW (64 hp)
- Propellers: 2-bladed IPT Modelo 9 wooden propeller, 1.69 m (5 ft 7 in) diameter

Performance

- Maximum speed: 220 km/h (140 mph, 120 kn)210
- Never exceed speed: 350 km/h (220 mph, 190 kn)
- Endurance: 4 h
- Wing loading: 70 kg/m^{2} (14 lb/sq ft)
