= Museu Aeroespacial =

Coordinates: 22°53′4.35″S 43°23′24.09″W

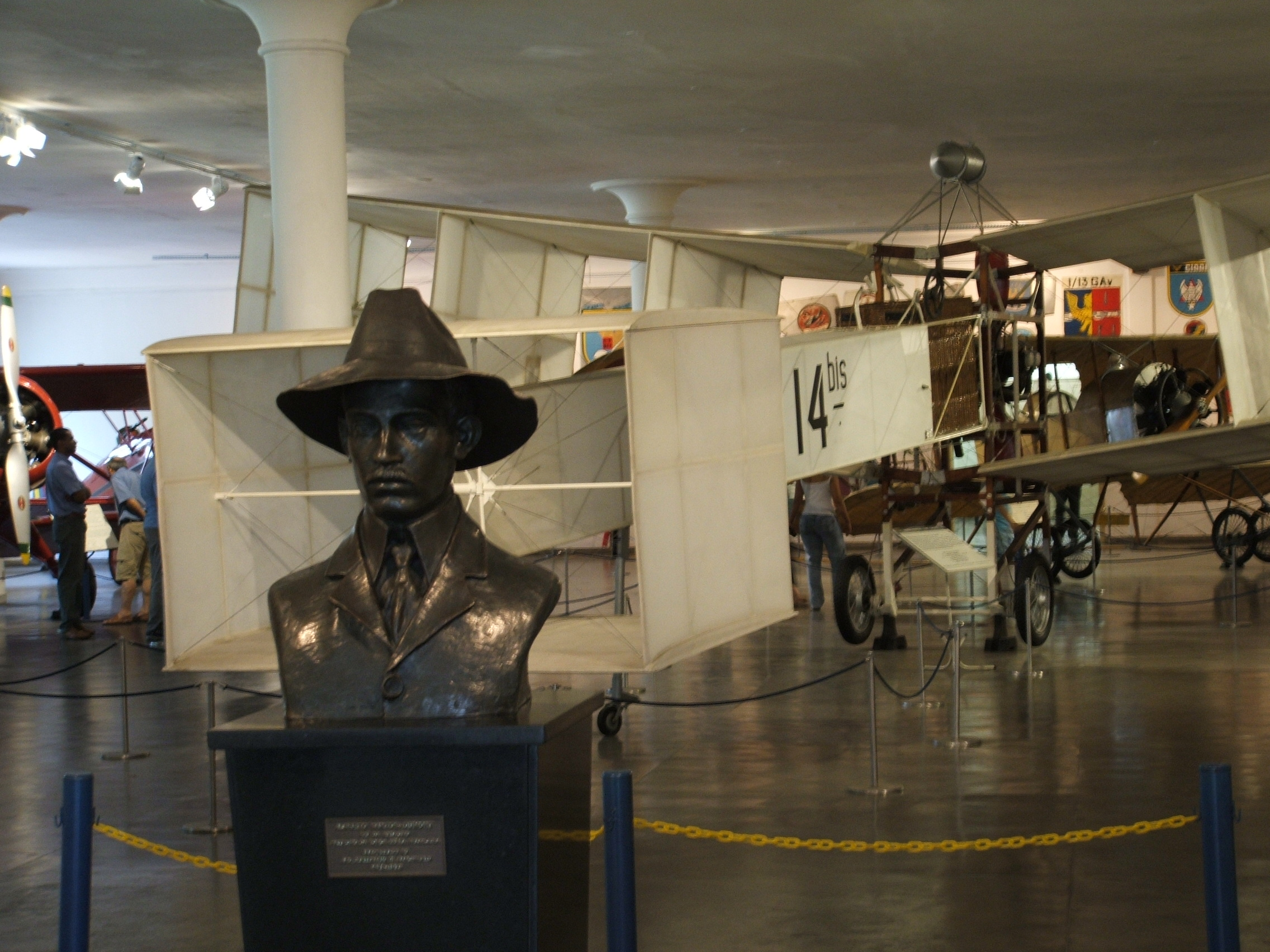
- Established: 18 October 1976
- Location: Campo dos Afonsos, Brazil
- Type: Aviation museum
- Website: www.musal.aer.mil.br

Museu Aeroespacial is a national aviation museum located in the West Side of Rio de Janeiro, Brazil in the Administrative Region of Realengo. The place is known as "the Brazilian Aviation cradle".

== History ==
The Museu Aeroespacial (Aerospace Museum) was inaugurated on 18 October 1976 at the installations of the old Escola de Aeronáutica (former Brazilian Air Force officer graduation school, replaced by the Academia da Força Aérea), at Afonsos Air Force Base—the "Cradle of Military Aviation", in the City of Rio de Janeiro, Estado do Rio de Janeiro, Brazil.

The idea of an "Aeronautical Museum" dates from 1943 when the Minister of Aeronautics, Dr. Salgado Filho, determined its organization, but the initial work and subsequent attempts were interrupted by lack of suitable space and installations.

Given the explanatory memorandum from Lieutenant Brigadier Joelmir Campos do Araripe Macedo, Minister of Aeronautics, President Emilio Garrastazu Medici established the nucleus of the Aerospace Museum on July 31, 1973, through Decree No. 72552. Building and hangar restoration started in January 1974, at the same time as the collection and restoration of aircraft, engines, weapons, documents, photographs, maps, paintings, memorabilia and other items of historical value.

The Aerospace Museum is part of the University of the Air Force's campus (UNIFA), being administratively subordinate to the Historic-Cultural Institute of Aeronautics (INCA) since 1986.

== Exhibits ==
The following aircraft are on permanent display at the museum, some of them in flyable condition:

Designation	FAB desig	Identity	Notes	Image
Aerotec Uirapuru	T-23	PP-ZTT		
Beechcraft D17S Staggerwing	UC-43	2778		
Beechcraft AT-11 Kansan	T-11	1371		
Beechcraft D18S	UC-45	2856		
Bell 47J	H-13J	8510	not on display Sept. 2012	
Bell 206 JetRanger	VH-4	8571		
Bensen B-8M		PP-ZWR	Gyrocopter	
Boeing-Stearman A75L3	K132			
Bücker Bü 131D-2 Jungmann		FAB 07		
CAP-4 Paulistinha		PP-TJR		
Caudron G.3				
Cessna L-19 Bird Dog	L-19E	3155		
Cessna AT-17 Bobcat	UC-78B	22		
Cessna T-37	T-37C	0922		
CNNA HL-6B		PP-RHW		
Consolidated PBY Catalina	C-10A	6527	Canso A	
Curtiss C-46 Commando	C-46	2058		
Curtiss Fledgling	J-2	K-263		
Curtiss P-40N	P-40N	4064		
Dassault Mirage IIIEBR	F-103E	4913		
De Havilland DH.89 Dragon Rapide		PP-VAN		
De Havilland DH.82A Tiger Moth	12HI	105		
De Havilland Canada DHC-5 Buffalo	C-115	2371		
Douglas A-20K Havoc	A-20K	6085		
Douglas B-26 Invader	A-26	5159		
Douglas C-47 Skytrain	C-47	2009		
Douglas DC-3		PP-AVJ	Aerovias Brasil	
Eipper Quicksilver MXL			Microlight	
Embraer EMB 326 Xavante	AT-26	4525	frame on display carries AT-26-4462 Sept. 2012	
Embraer EMB-110 Bandeirante	YC-95	2130	Prototype	
Aeritalia/Macchi/EMBRAER AMX	YA-1	4201	Prototype	
Fairchild 22-C7G		PP-TBD	Aeroclube de Ribeião Preto	
Fairchild 24-W41 Forwarder	UC-61A	2683		
Fairchild PT-19 Cornell	PT-19	0500		
Fairchild PT-26 Cornell	PT-26	0310	not on display Sept. 2012	
Fairchild C-119 Flying Boxcar	C-119G	2305	not on public display Sept. 2012, can be seen in adjacent maintenance hangar	
Fairchild Hiller FH-1100		PP-EFN		
Focke-Wulf Fw 44	11AvN	161		
Focke-Wulf Fw 58B-2 Weihe	AT-Fw	1530		
Fokker S.11	T-21	0789	not on display Sept. 2012	
Fokker S.12	T-22	0811	not on display Sept. 2012	
Fouga CM.170 Magister	T-24	1720		
Gloster Meteor F.8	F-8	4460		
Gloster Meteor T.7	TF-7F	4309		
Grumman G-44A Widgeon		14		
Grumman HU-16 Albatross	SA-16	6529		
Grumman S-2A Tracker	P-16A	7016		
Grumman S-2E Tracker	P-16E	7037		
Hawker Siddeley 125	VU-93	2113		
Hawker Siddeley 748	C-91	2504		
IPT-0 Bichinho II		PT-KYL		
Jacobs Hols der Teufel			Hendrich Kurt's Glider	
Lockheed F-80S Shooting Star	F-80C	4201		
Lockheed F-104S Starfighter		MM6890	Aeronautica Militare (Italian AF), marked 9-51, Sept. 2012	
Lockheed P-2E Neptune	P-2E	7010		
Lockheed T-33 Shooting StarA	TF-33A	4364		
Lockheed Model 18 Lodestar	C-60A	2006		
Lockheed 188 Electra		PP-VJM	Varig	
Morane-Saulnier MS.760 Paris	C-41	2932	carries C-41-2932, Sept. 2012	
Muniz M-7		13	no marks, Sept. 2012	
Neiva Paulistinha	L-6	3095		
Neiva Regente	YL-42	3120		
Neiva Regente	L-42	3225	not on display Sept. 2012	
Neiva Universal	YT-25	1830		
Nieuport 21E.1		N2102		
North American B-25 Mitchell	B-25J	5127		
North American F-86K Sabre		0014	FA Venezolana	
North American T-6D Texan	T-6D	1559		
North American T-6D Texan	T-6D	1617	not on display Sept. 2012	
North American T-28A Trojan		N-703	Marinha	
Northrop F-5B	F-5B	4800		
Pilatus P-3	O-3	3182		
Piper L-4		PP-TUF		
Republic P-47 Thunderbolt		420339	marked 419662, Sept. 2012	
Santos-Dumont 14-bis			Replica	
Santos-Dumont Demoiselle			Replica	
Stearman A-76		K210		
Stinson SR-10E Reliant	UCSR10	2653		
Vickers Viscount	VC-90	2101	Presidential Airplane	
Vultee BT-15 Valiant	BT-15	1072		
Waco CJC		C66		
Waco CPF-5		C80		
Waco CSO		F154	no marks, Sept. 2012	
Waco RNF		K162		
Westland Wasp HAS.1		N-7039	Navy	
Also on site Sept. 2012: PT-ZJA Embraer EMB-140, PP-ZVB Embraer/FMA CBA 123 Vector, PP-ZTU glider, PP-ZDB IPT-16 Surubim, PT-ZBN dismantled, Boeing 737-2N3 VC96-2116 732, K162 biplane, VU9-2654 Embraer EMB 121 Xingu, 5701 Embraer EMB-314-ALX-Super Tucano, 4634 Aermacchi MB.326, U7A-2632 Embraer EMB-810, Embraer AT-26 Xavante-4462, G-19-0151 Embraer EMB-201 Ipanema, Lockheed B-34/PV-1 no marks, 4904 Dassault Mirage III, Douglas C-47 2015

== See also ==
- List of aerospace museums
