= Stout Skycar =

1930s American light aircraft family

Skycar
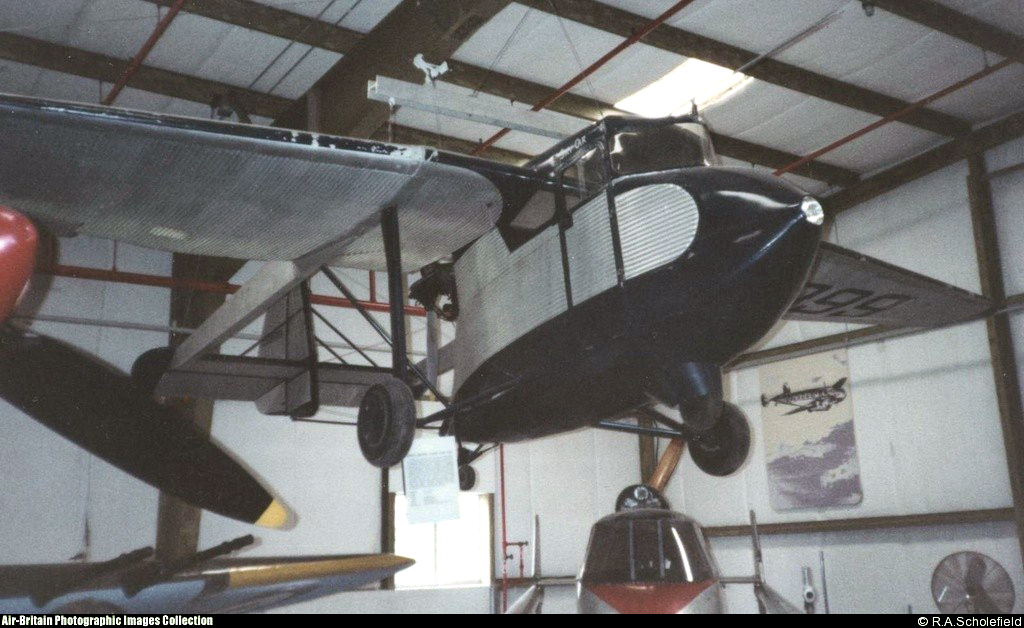
- The Skycar I, as later modified, on display in the National Air and Space Museum workshops, Silver Hill, Maryland in June 1982

General information
- Type: Two-seat light aircraft
- National origin: United States
- Manufacturer: Stout Engineering Laboratory
- Designer: William B. Stout
- Status: Skycar I preserved
- Number built: 4

History
- Introduction date: 1931
- First flight: 1931

The Stout Skycar is a series of four one-off American light aircraft of the 1930s.

== Development ==
William Bushnell Stout was a prolific designer of road vehicles and aircraft, including the Ford Trimotor series. He was founder of the Stout Metal Airplane Division of the Ford Motor Company and in 1931 designed the Skycar which was specified for easy handling and provided with automobile-style comfort. Single examples of four variations on the basic design were produced between 1931 and 1944.

The Skycar I was first displayed at the spring 1931 Detroit Show. The aircraft was a two-seat high-wing monoplane, accommodating the occupants in tandem layout. It had an all-metal steel-tube frame covered with corrugated metal skin. Centre-line nose and tail-wheels plus a standard landing gear were fitted. The rear fuselage was constructed from an open framework carrying a single fin and rudder, inside which was located the rear pusher engine. The Sky Car was displayed with a Moorhouse engine (Alfred Moorhouse of Detroit, assignor to Packard Motor Car Company). Fuel was carried in two tanks in the leading portion of the central section of the engine housing, from where it was fed by gravity to the engine. At a later date the aircraft was fitted with twin booms carrying the single fin and rudder (see photo of preserved aircraft). The aircraft featured balanced pivoting outboard wingtips rather than ailerons. Stout attempted to design a simple aircraft that would have controls similar to early model Fords including the ignition switch and the starter button. Stout planned to build the Sky Car (i.e. its original name was "Sky Car" but various newspaper and magazine articles spelled it "Skycar") and sell it at the price of a moderately priced car (approximately $2000) if mass-produced in numbers.

The Skycar II of 1941 was a higher-powered version utilising stainless steel construction and twin tail booms. The four-wheel landing gear was intended to facilitate a later rebuild to roadability which never occurred. It was built with support from Fred Fisher of General Motors.

The Skycar III of 1943 had a higher-powered Lycoming engine to enable operation at higher gross weight, but was otherwise similar to the Skycar II.

The Skycar IV of 1944 was also known as the Spratt-Stout Model 8 and the Convair 103. It was similar to the Skycar III with twin tail-booms, but fitted with twin fins and rudders.

== Operational history ==
The Skycar I, sometimes referred to as the Model 11-W. It was flown as a personal aircraft by Stout for several years and was later donated to the Smithsonian Institution. It is on display in the National Air and Space Museum at Dulles Airport Virginia.

The Skycar II was evaluated by the United States Army Air Forces (USAAF) as the XC-65 light transport. It was destroyed in a hangar fire circa 1942.

The Skycar III was tested by the USAAF as the XC-107.

== Variants ==

Data from:-Aerofiles: Stout

Skycar I
75 hp (56 kW) Michigan Rover R-267 pusher engine, later 90 hp (67 kW) Warner Junior. (1 built)
Skycar II
90 hp (67 kW) Franklin O-200 pusher engine. Gross weight 1550 lbs. (1 built)
Skycar III
125 hp (93 kW) Lycoming O-290 pusher engine. Gross weight 1825 lbs. (1 built)
Skycar IV
90 hp (67 kW) Franklin 4ACG pusher engine, later 125 hp (93 kW) Lycoming O-290C. (1 built)

Weick W1
Fred Weick of NACA, with permission, built his own aircraft based roughly on the Skycar for safety and control tests. The tested features were later applied to his ERCO Ercoupe design.

== Specifications (Skycar I) ==
Data from Jane's all the World's Aircraft 1931, Aerofiles: Stout

General characteristics

- Crew: 2
- Length: 23 ft 11 in (7.3 m)
- Wingspan: 43 ft 0 in (13.1 m)
- Wing area: 188.5 sq ft (17.51 m^{2})
- Empty weight: 950 lb (431 kg)
- Gross weight: 1,425 lb (646 kg)
- Powerplant: 1 × Michigan Rover R-267 4-cylinder in-line air-cooled piston engine, 75 hp (56 kW)
- Propellers: 2-bladed wooden fixed-pitch pusher propeller

Performance

- Maximum speed: 95 mph (153 km/h, 83 kn)
- Cruise speed: 80 mph (130 km/h, 70 kn)
- Stall speed: 35 mph (56 km/h, 30 kn)
- Range: 320 mi (510 km, 280 nmi)
- Wing loading: 7.6 lb/sq ft (37 kg/m^{2})
- Power/mass: 19 lb/hp (12 kg/kW)
