= Arctic Aircraft Arctic Tern =

Arctic Tern
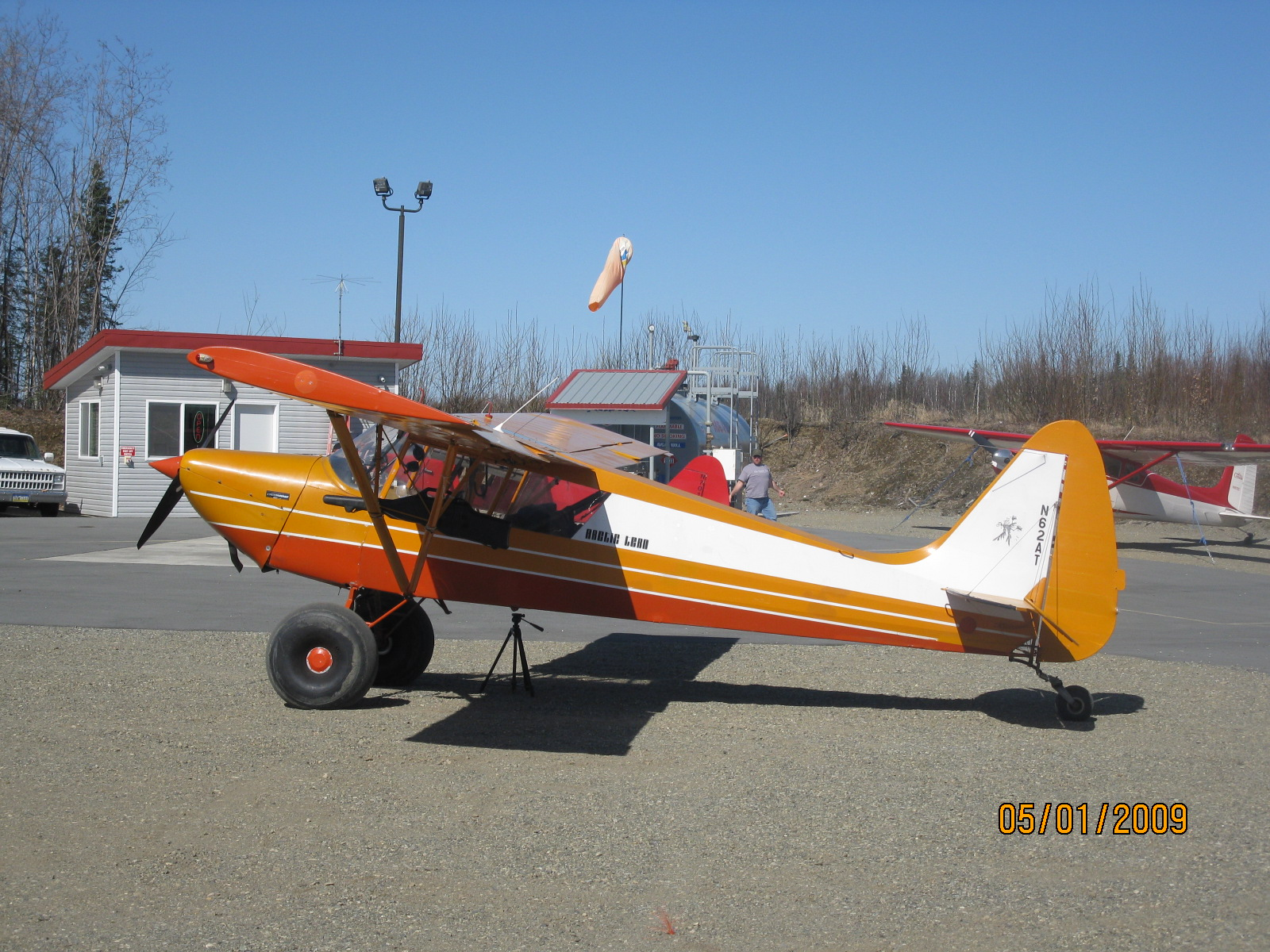
- Arctic Tern with tundra tires on mainwheels

General information
- Manufacturer: Arctic Aircraft
- Designer: Bill Diehl
- Number built: 32

History
- Manufactured: 1975-85
- First flight: 1975

The Arctic Aircraft Arctic Tern (named after the bird with the same name) is a bush plane that was produced in small numbers in Alaska in the 1970s and 1980s. It is a strengthened and modernised version of the Interstate Cadet of the 1940s. It is a high-wing braced monoplane with fixed tailwheel undercarriage. It has two seats in tandem, with the rear seat removable for added cargo carriage. It is also provided with a cargo loading door in the fuselage side to facilitate loading bulky items. Optional fittings included floats or skis in place of the wheeled undercarriage, and a ventral pod to carry extra cargo or fuel.

In 2007, the Interstate Aircraft company was planning a revised and updated Arctic Tern, with US FAA certification expected in the first half of the year.

== Specifications (landplane) ==
Data from Jane's All The World's Aircraft 1988-89

General characteristics

- Crew: one pilot
- Capacity: 1 passenger
- Length: 23 ft 0 in (7.01 m)
- Wingspan: 36 ft 8 in (11.18 m)
- Height: 7 ft 0 in (2.13 m)
- Wing area: 186 sq ft (17.3 m^{2})
- Empty weight: 1,073 lb (487 kg)
- Gross weight: 1,900 lb (862 kg)
- Powerplant: 1 × Lycoming O-320 four-cylinder piston engine , 150 hp (112 kW)

Performance

- Maximum speed: 117 mph (188 km/h, 102 kn)
- Range: 652 mi (1,049 km, 567 nmi)
- Service ceiling: 19,000 ft (5,790 m)
- Rate of climb: 1,275 ft/min (6.5 m/s)

== See also ==
Related development

- Interstate Cadet
