= Indústria Aeronáutica Neiva =

Brazilian airplane production subsidiary

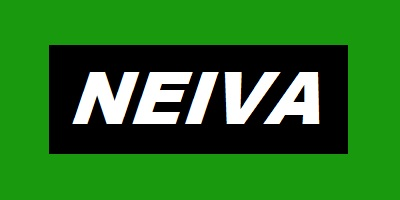
- Type: Subsidiary
- Industry: Aerospace / Defense
- Founded: 1954
- Headquarters: Botucatu, São Paulo, Brazil
- Key people: Maurício Botelho, President & CEO
- Products: Airplanes and components
- Number of employees: 1,300 (2006)
- Parent: Embraer
- Website: www.aeroneiva.com.br

Indústria Aeronáutica Neiva is a subsidiary of Embraer which produces airplanes and aircraft components. Its main product is the Embraer EMB 202 Ipanema, the most employed agricultural aircraft in Brazil and the first alcohol-powered airplane. Neiva delivered more than 3,700 aircraft until early 2006.

The company was founded in Rio de Janeiro, in 1954, by José Carlos de Barros Neiva. It started as a glider manufacturer. It moved to Botucatu in 1956. The company produced many gliders and general aviation aircraft until March 11, 1980, when it was acquired by Embraer. After the acquisition, Neiva also started to produce the Ipanema and various components for Embraer aircraft, including the Embraer ERJ 145 family, the Embraer EMB 314 Super Tucano and the Embraer E-Jets. Neiva also produced the Embraer EMB 120 Brasilia from 1999 to 2002. In 2006 it was incorporated by Embraer, becoming a unit focused especially on manufacturing agricultural aircraft.

== Aircraft ==
Summary of aircraft built by Neiva
Model name	First flight	Number built	Type
Neiva B Monitor	1945	21	Single seat sailplane glider
Neiva BN-1	1955	4	Single seat sailplane glider
Neiva Paulistinha 56	1956	256	Two seat high-wing utility aircraft
Neiva Regente	1961	120	Two seat high-wing utility aircraft
Neiva P-56 Agricola	1965	60	Agricultural aircraft
Neiva Campeiro	1962	20	Two seat high-wing utility aircraft
Neiva Universal	1966	189	Twin-engine trainer aircraft
Neiva Sertanejo			Twin-engine light aircraft
Neiva Seneca	1975	680	Twin-engine light aircraft
Neiva Corisco			Twin-engine light aircraft
Neiva Minuano			Single-engine light aircraft
Neiva Ipanema	1981	926	Agricultural aircraft
Neiva Carajá	1983	18	Twin-engine light aircraft
Neiva Brasilia	1999	29	Twin-turboprop light aircraft
