= Arctic Aircraft =

Arctic Aircraft Company
- Company type: Private
- Industry: Aircraft manufacturing
- Founded: 1975
- Founder: Bill Diehl
- Fate: Closed in 1985; rights sold to Interstate Aircraft Company
- Headquarters: Anchorage, Alaska, United States
- Products: Arctic Tern (light aircraft)

The Arctic Aircraft Company was founded in Anchorage, Alaska by Bill Diehl in 1975 to produce an updated version of the Interstate Cadet light aircraft as the Arctic Tern. In 1985, the company closed down, and rights to the aircraft went to the Interstate Aircraft Company.
