= Johnson-Funke monoplane =

1930s United States experimental twin-engine aircraft

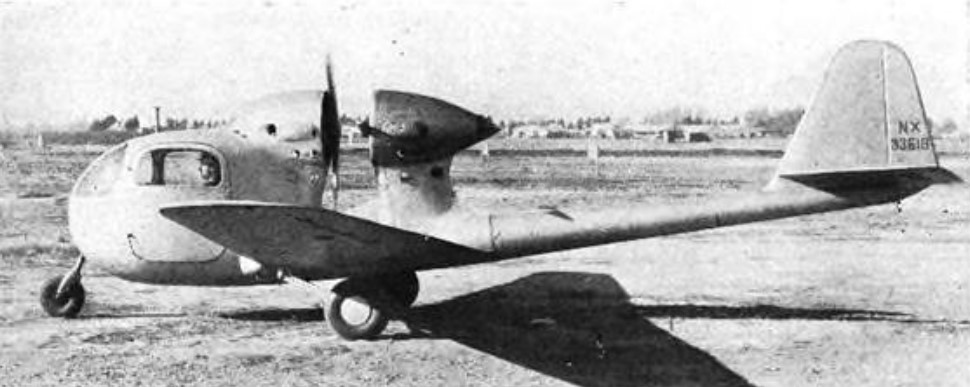
- Side view of the Johnson-Funke monoplane

General information
- Type: Experimental aircraft
- National origin: United States
- Manufacturer: Johnson-Funke Aircraft Co.
- Designer: Alfred C. Johnson

History
- First flight: 1941
- Retired: 1941

The Johnson-Funke monoplane was an experimental twin-engine monoplane with the engines arranged in a push-pull configuration.

== Design and development ==
In 1941, the Johnson-Funke Aircraft Company was set up with a capital of $500,000, with the intention of building a plane capable of taking 3 to 5 passengers. Its two principals were Alfred C. Johnson and Henry W. Funke. Johnson had designed a twin-engine airplane whose engines were placed in a tandem push-pull arrangement. It was a low-wing monoplane, with a pod-and-boom style of fuselage and a tricycle undercarriage. The fuselage and wings were made of plywood, with dural used for the tail surfaces and the engine cowlings. The monoplane's most notable feature was the arrangement of the two engines and propellers, which were positioned facing each other. It had the registration NX33618.

The airframe reached approximately 200 flight-hours before the United States' entry into World War II suspended the project; the airframe was dismantled and stored for the duration of the war. In 1942, Johnson and Funke were granted patent No. 134,458, for "Design for an Airplane". In 1946, it was reported that the aircraft was being reassembled for tests leading to a production version.

== Specifications ==
Data from Aviation Week

General characteristics

- Crew: 1, pilot
- Capacity: 1 passenger
- Length: 29 ft (8.8 m)
- Wingspan: 36 ft (11 m)
- Gross weight: 2,000 lb (907 kg)
- Powerplant: 2 × Franklin , 80 hp (60 kW) each
- Propellers: 2-bladed, 6 ft (1.8 m) diameter

Performance

- Cruise speed: 135 mph (217 km/h, 117 kn)
- Range: 400 mi (640 km, 350 nmi)
