= CAP-5 Carioca =

General information
- Type: Civil trainer aircraft
- Manufacturer: CAP
- Number built: 10

History
- First flight: February 1945

The CAP-5 Carioca was a civil trainer aircraft developed in Brazil during World War II. It was essentially an enlarged version of the CAP-4, itself an unlicensed copy of the Taylor Cub. The CAP-5 had a bigger cabin, a more powerful engine, and revised flying surfaces. Certification proved difficult to obtain, and eventually only seven aircraft were built, going to Brazilian aero clubs. The design was briefly revived in 1948 for what was to be CAP's last design, the CAP-9 air ambulance. Again, few were made.

== See also ==
- I.Ae. 31 Colibrí
- IMPA Tu-Sa
