= CAP-1 Planalto =

- CAP-4 Planalto after its first flight, still under the designation IPT-4, in 1942.

General information
- Type: Military trainer
- Manufacturer: CAP
- Designer: Clay Presgrave do Amaral
- Number built: 20

History
- First flight: 1942

The CAP-1 Planalto was a military trainer aircraft built in Brazil during World War II. It was a low-wing cantilever monoplane with fixed tailwheel undercarriage that accommodated the pilot and instructor in tandem open cockpits. The project had been initiated by Instituto de Pesquisas Tecnológicas (IPT) under the designation IPT-4 and although the design work had been contracted to CAP, IPT insisted on a wing profile of its own choosing that led to serious stability problems in the final product.

The CAP-3 replaced the CAP-1's Franklin 4AC engine with a de Havilland Gipsy with double its power, but the stability problems remained unaddressed until CAP engineer Oswaldo Fadigas redesigned the wing in the CAP-6. The firm attempted to sell this latter type to the Ministry of Aeronautics, but succeeded only in selling conversion kits for the existing CAP-1s and -3s in the military's inventory.

== Specifications ==
Data from Jane's All The World's Aircraft 1951–52

General characteristics

- Crew: 2
- Length: 6.4 m (21 ft 0 in)
- Wingspan: 8.6 m (28 ft 3 in)
- Height: 2.6 m (8 ft 6 in)
- Wing area: 12 m^{2} (130 sq ft)
- Aspect ratio: 6.16:1
- Empty weight: 335 kg (739 lb)
- Gross weight: 570 kg (1,257 lb)
- Powerplant: 1 × Franklin 4AC four-cylinder air-cooled horizontally-opposed, 67 kW (90 hp)

Performance

- Cruise speed: 155 km/h (96 mph, 84 kn)
- Stall speed: 85 km/h (53 mph, 46 kn)
- Endurance: 2.5 hours
