= Neiva Regente =

Regente
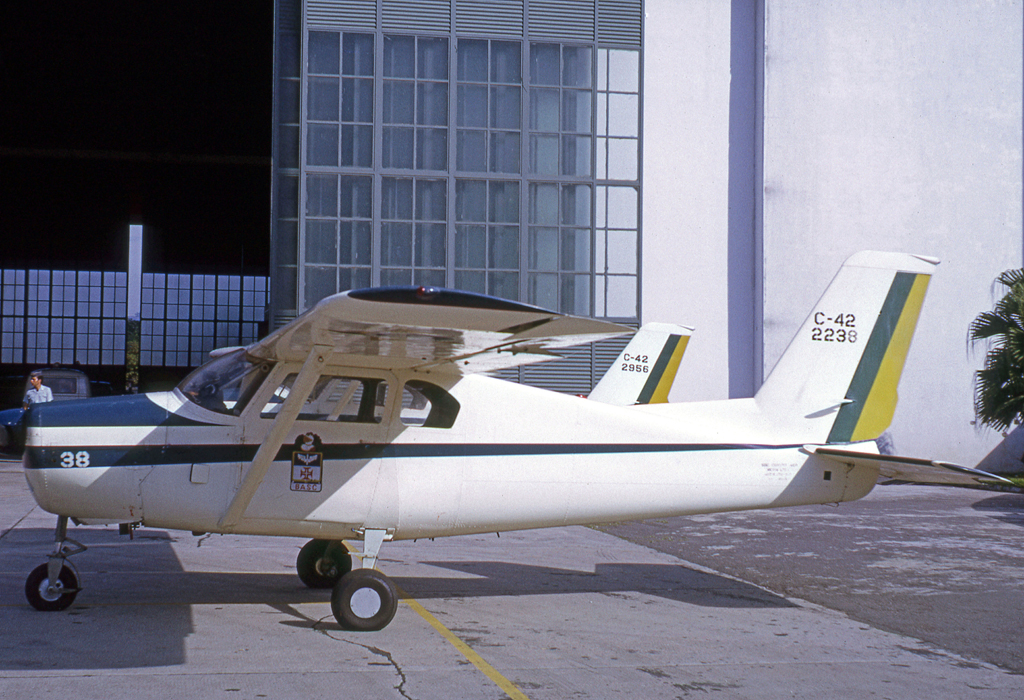
- Operational C-42 Regente of the Base Aerea Santa Cruz in 1972

General information
- Type: Utility transport and AOP
- Manufacturer: Neiva
- Primary user: Brazilian Air Force
- Number built: 122

History
- Manufactured: 1963–1975 (360 Regente); 1969–1971 (420L Regente); 1973–1976 (420 Lanceiro)
- Introduction date: 1963 (360 Regente); 1969 (420L Regente); 1973 (420 Lanceiro)
- First flight: 7 September 1961 (360 Regente); January 1967 (420L Regente); 1972 (420 Lanciero)

Neiva Regente is a Brazilian propeller-driven four-seat light utility aircraft manufactured by Indústria Aeronáutica Neiva.

== History ==
The design was started in 1959 for a four-seat cabin monoplane aircraft with a high wing and fixed undercarriage. The prototype, designated the Neiva Regente 360C, was first flown on 7 September 1961 with a 145 hp (108 kW) Continental O-300 piston engine.

The type was ordered into production by the Brazilian Air Force with a more powerful 180 hp (134 kW) Lycoming O-360-A1D engine. Eighty aircraft were built originally designated the U-42 (later changed to C-42) for the utility role. First delivery occurred in February 1975. Neiva developed a three-seat air observation post version for the Air Force, designated the Regente 420L. Its tailcone was lowered in order to improve visibility, and it used a more powerful Continental IO-360D 210 hp engine. The aircraft was first flown in January 1967 as the YL-42. Forty were built for the Brazilian Air Force as the L-42. It had provision to carry light bombs or rockets on underwing hardpoints.

Neiva also developed a four-seat civil version designated the Lanceiro. The prototype (Registered PP-ZAH) first flew in 1970, followed by production aircraft in 1973. The company's subsequent involvement with Embraer resulted in the Lanceiro's program termination.

== Variants ==
- Regente 360C – utility version (80 built)
  - U-42 – military designation of the Regente 360C
  - C-42 – military designation changed from U-42
- Regente 420L – air observation post version (40 built)
  - L-42 – military designation of the Regente 420L. Originally designated L-8 and L-20.
- Lanciero – civil version (2 built)

== Operators ==
Brazil

- Brazilian Air Force

Zimbabwe

- Zimbabwe Air Force

== Specifications (C-42) ==
Data from Jane's All the World's Aircraft 1969–70

General characteristics

- Crew: 1
- Capacity: 3 passengers
- Length: 7.04 m (23 ft 1 in)
- Wingspan: 9.13 m (29 ft 11 in)
- Height: 2.93 m (9 ft 7 in)
- Wing area: 13.45 m^{2} (144.8 sq ft)
- Aspect ratio: 6:1
- Airfoil: NACA 4410
- Empty weight: 640 kg (1,411 lb)
- Max takeoff weight: 1,040 kg (2,293 lb)
- Fuel capacity: 172 L (45 US gal; 38 imp gal)
- Powerplant: 1 × Lycoming O-360-A1D air-cooled flat-four engine, 130 kW (180 hp)
- Propellers: 2-bladed Hartzell HC-C2YK-1A/A7666 constant-speed propeller

Performance

- Maximum speed: 220 km/h (140 mph, 120 kn) at sea level
- Cruise speed: 212 km/h (132 mph, 114 kn) (max cruise)
- Stall speed: 90 km/h (56 mph, 49 kn) (flaps down)
- Range: 928 km (577 mi, 501 nmi) at 1,500 m (4,900 ft) (econ. cruise)
- Service ceiling: 3,600 m (11,800 ft)
- Rate of climb: 3.5 m/s (690 ft/min)
- Takeoff run to 15 m (50 ft): 350 m (1,150 ft)
- Landing run from 15 m (50 ft): 460 m (1,510 ft)
