= CAP-4 Paulistinha =

Brazilian trainer aircraft

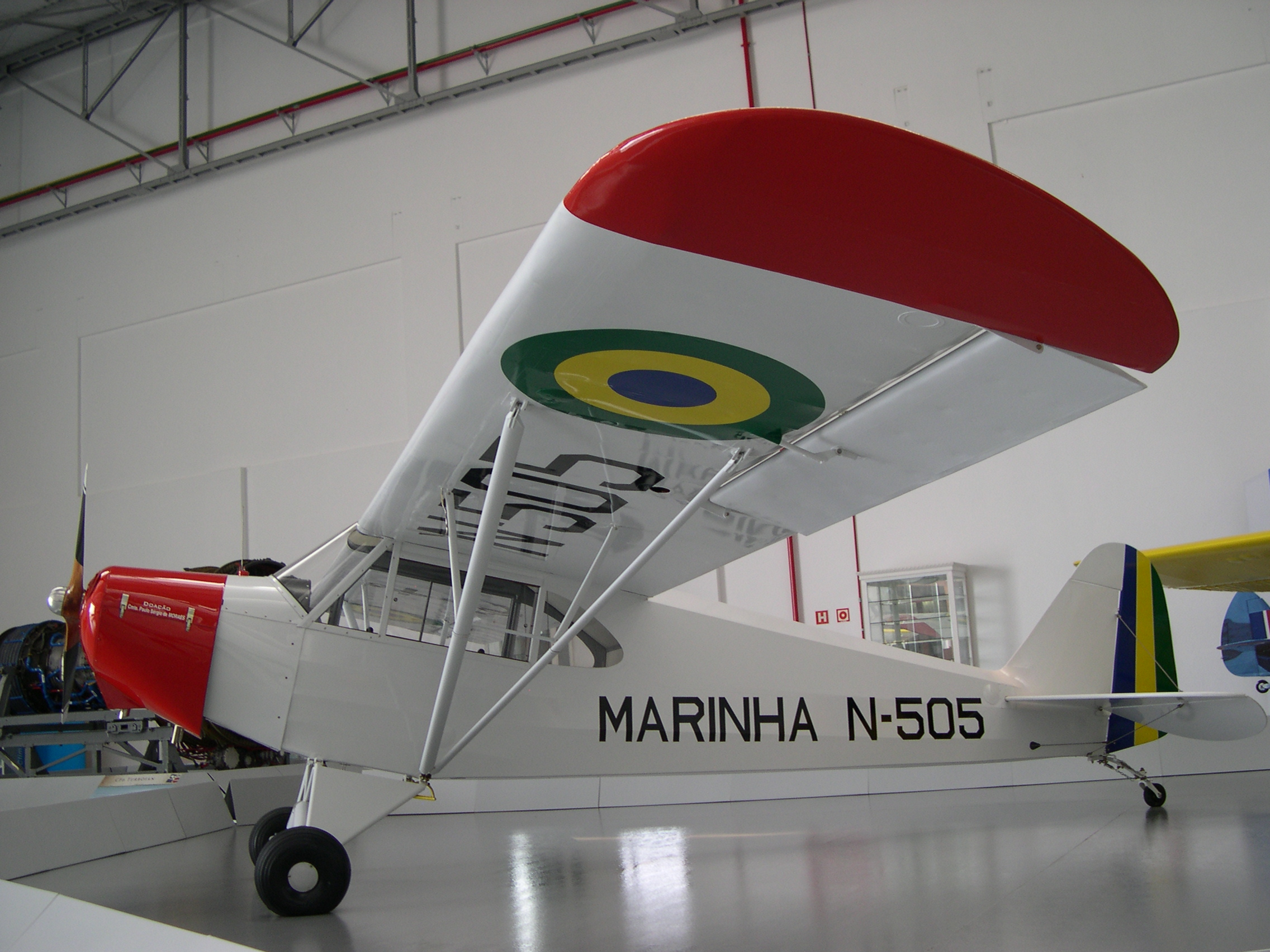
- Brazilian Navy CAP-4 preserved at the Museu Asas de um Sonho

General information
- Type: Trainer
- Manufacturer: EAY, CAP
- Number built: 1.149

History
- First flight: 1935

The CAP-4 Paulistinha was a military and civilian trainer aircraft built in Brazil during the 1930s and 1940s.

== Design and development ==
The CAP-4 was originally developed by Empresa Aeronáutica Ypiranga as an unlicensed copy of the Taylor Cub powered by a Salmson 9Ad radial engine. It featured a high strut-braced wing, two enclosed tandem seats, and a steel-tube fuselage with fabric covering. Its tailwheel undercarriage was not retractable.

EAY had built five examples by the time that the firm was purchased by Companhia Aeronáutica Paulista in 1942. CAP continued manufacturing the type under the designation CAP-4.

The type was widely successful, with nearly 800 units being produced for Brazil's flying clubs and armed forces, as well as for export to Argentina, Paraguay, Chile, Uruguay and Portugal. At the time of peak production in 1943, a new CAP-4 left the factory every day, and production continued until 1948.

In 1956, Sociedade Aeronáutica Neiva acquired the rights renaming it to P-56 Paulistinha, the design was used as the basis for an agricultural aircraft, the P-56 Agricola, adding a fibreglass chemical hopper and spraybars, but this was unable to compete with imported, purpose-built agricultural aircraft.

== Variants ==
EAY-201
original radial engined version
CAP-4
main production version
CAP-4B
air ambulance version (2 prototypes built)
CAP-4C
artillery-spotting version, (Paulistinha Rádio or Paulistinha Observação)
P-56 Agricola
agricultural version by Neiva (60 built)
Paulistinha 56-C
Powered by 90 horsepower (67 kW) Continental C-90-8F/12F engine. 256 built by Neiva between 1958 and 1964.
P56C-1 Paulistinha Rebocador
Paulistinha 56-D
More powerful version with 150 horsepower (110 kW) Lycoming O-320-A1A. Single prototype built, which was designated L-6A by Brazilian Air Force. No production.
O-6
Brazilian Air Force designation for an observation variant of the Paulistinha 56-B. Previously designated L-6.

== Former operators ==
Brazil

- Brazilian Navy

Paraguay

- Paraguayan Military Aviation 4 aircraft bought in the early 1960s
- Paraguayan Aeroclub 4 aircraft bought in the 1950s

== Specifications (CAP-4) ==
Data from Jane's Fighting Aircraft of World War II

General characteristics

- Crew: Two, pilot and instructor
- Length: 6.65 m (21 ft 10 in)
- Wingspan: 10.10 m (33 ft 2 in)
- Height: 1.95 m (6 ft 5 in)
- Wing area: 17.0 m^{2} (183 sq ft)
- Empty weight: 320 kg (705 lb)
- Gross weight: 540 kg (1,190 lb)
- Fuel capacity: 58 L (15 US gal; 13 imp gal)
- Powerplant: 1 × Franklin 4AC air-cooled flat-four engine, 48 kW (65 hp)

Performance

- Maximum speed: 155 km/h (96 mph, 84 kn)
- Cruise speed: 140 km/h (87 mph, 76 kn)
- Range: 500 km (310 mi, 270 nmi)
- Service ceiling: 4,000 m (13,000 ft)
- Rate of climb: 3.1 m/s (610 ft/min)
