= List of Brazilian gliders =

This is a list of gliders/sailplanes of the world, (this reference lists all gliders with references, where available) Note: Any aircraft can glide for a short time, but gliders are designed to glide for longer.

== Brazilian miscellaneous constructors ==
- Aeromot AMT-100 Ximango — AEROMOT — Aeronaves e Motores S/A
- Aeromot AMT-200 Super Ximango — AEROMOT — Aeronaves e Motores S/A
- Aeromot AMT-300 Turbo Ximango Shark — AEROMOT — Aeronaves e Motores S/A
- Agripino Souza AMX-3 — Souza, Agripino
- CAP Alcatraz — Companhia Aeronáutica Paulista — Brazil
- CEA-101 CB.1 Gaivota — de Barros, Cláudio — "CEA — UFMG”
- CEA CB.2 Minuano — de Barros, Cláudio — "CEA — UFMG”
- EAY Primário — Empresa Aeronáutica Ypiranga
- EAY Secundário — Empresa Aeronáutica Ypiranga
- Embraer EMB 400 Urupema — Instituto Tecnológico de Aeronáutica de São José dos Campos / Empresa Brasileira de Aeronáutica — Brazil
- HW-4 Flamingo — Widmer, Hans
- IPD Urubu — Centro Técnico Aeroespacial (CTA) — São José dos Campos (SP)
- IPD Periquito — Pessotti, Guido — Centro Técnico Aeroespacial (CTA)
- IPE 02 Nhapecan — Boscardin, João Carlos — Indústria Paranaense de Estruturas, Curitiba (PR)
- IPT-1 Gafanhoto — Instituto de Pesquisas Tecnológicas - São Paulo
- IPT-2 Aratinga — Instituto de Pesquisas Tecnológicas - São Paulo
- IPT-3 Saracura — Instituto de Pesquisas Tecnológicas - São Paulo
- IPT-5 Jaraguá — Instituto de Pesquisas Tecnológicas - São Paulo
- IPT-6 Stratus — Instituto de Pesquisas Tecnológicas - São Paulo
- IPT-12 Caboré — Instituto de Pesquisas Tecnológicas - São Paulo
- IPT-14 Marreco — Instituto de Pesquisas Tecnológicas - São Paulo
- ITA P-1 — Schubert, Ekkehard — Instituto Tecnológico de Aeronáutica — São José dos Campos (SP)
- Juvenelle Rosario Skua — Florianópolis, Brazil
- Romagna Larus QR-15 — Romagna, Quintino
- Neiva B Monitor — “Industria Aeronautica Neiva”. Neiva, Jose Carlos
- Neiva BN-1 — “Industria Aeronautica Neiva”. Neiva, Jose Carlos
- PCB-1 — Planador Clube do Brasil — Rio de Janeiro (RJ)
- Professor — Ponta Grossa (PR)
- Reis BG 12-16 — Reis, Osório
- Rio Claro Araponga — de Oliveira, Sílvio — Aero Clube de Rio Claro, Rio Claro (SP)
- Santa Maria SM-1 — Hausen, João Carlos
- Santa Maria SM-2 — Hausen, João Carlos
- Santa Maria SM-3 — Hausen, João Carlos
- Santa Cruz do Sul S.C.S.1 — Lohre, Rudolf — Wenneck, Gustav — Santa Cruz do Sul (RS)
- Santa Cruz do Sul S.C.S.2 — Lohre, Rudolf — Santa Cruz do Sul (RS)
- Schubert P-1 — Schubert, Ekkehard Carlos Fernando – TECSIS, Sorocaba (SP)
- SP-19 Galinha — Instituto de Pesquisas Tecnológicas - São Paulo
- SP-21 Ganso — Instituto de Pesquisas Tecnológicas - São Paulo
- Sidou João Grande — Eng. Antônio Menezes Sidou
- Widmaier GB-1 Quero — Widmaier, Kuno
- Widmaier KW-1 Quero Quero — Widmaier, Kuno — IPE (Industria Paranaense de Estruturas)
- Widmaier KW 2 Biguá — Widmaier, Kuno
