= List of Chinese gliders =

This is a list of gliders/sailplanes of the world, (this reference lists all gliders with references, where available) Note: Any aircraft can glide for a short time, but gliders are designed to glide for longer.

== Chinese gliders ==
(X-Xianji – glider)

- Jie-Fang 1
- Shenyang HU-1 Seagull (Chen Kuiwen)
- Shenyang HU-2 Petrel
- Xiangji X-5A
- Chengdu X-7 Jian Fan (Xiangji X-7)
- Shenyang X-9 Jian Fan (Xiangji X-9)
- Shenyang X-10 Qian Jin (Xiangji X-10) – Shenyang Sailplane Works
- Shenyang X-11 (Xiangji X-11) – Shenyang Sailplane Works
- Guangzhou Powered J7 (Guangzhou Sport University)
- Fu-Shun 2
- Jeifang 1 (NIESPAL, J. & Chen Kuiwen & LI JIJUN)
- Jeifang 2 (JIJUN, Li & DIHUAN, Feng)
- Jeifang 3 (JIJUN, Li)
- Jeifang 5 (Chen Kuiwen)
- Jeifang 7 (DEZUNG, Shan & XINMIN, Hung)
- Jeifang 9 (DIHUAN, Feng)
