= Embraer EMB 400 Urupema =

1960s Brazilian sailplane

EMB 400 Urupema
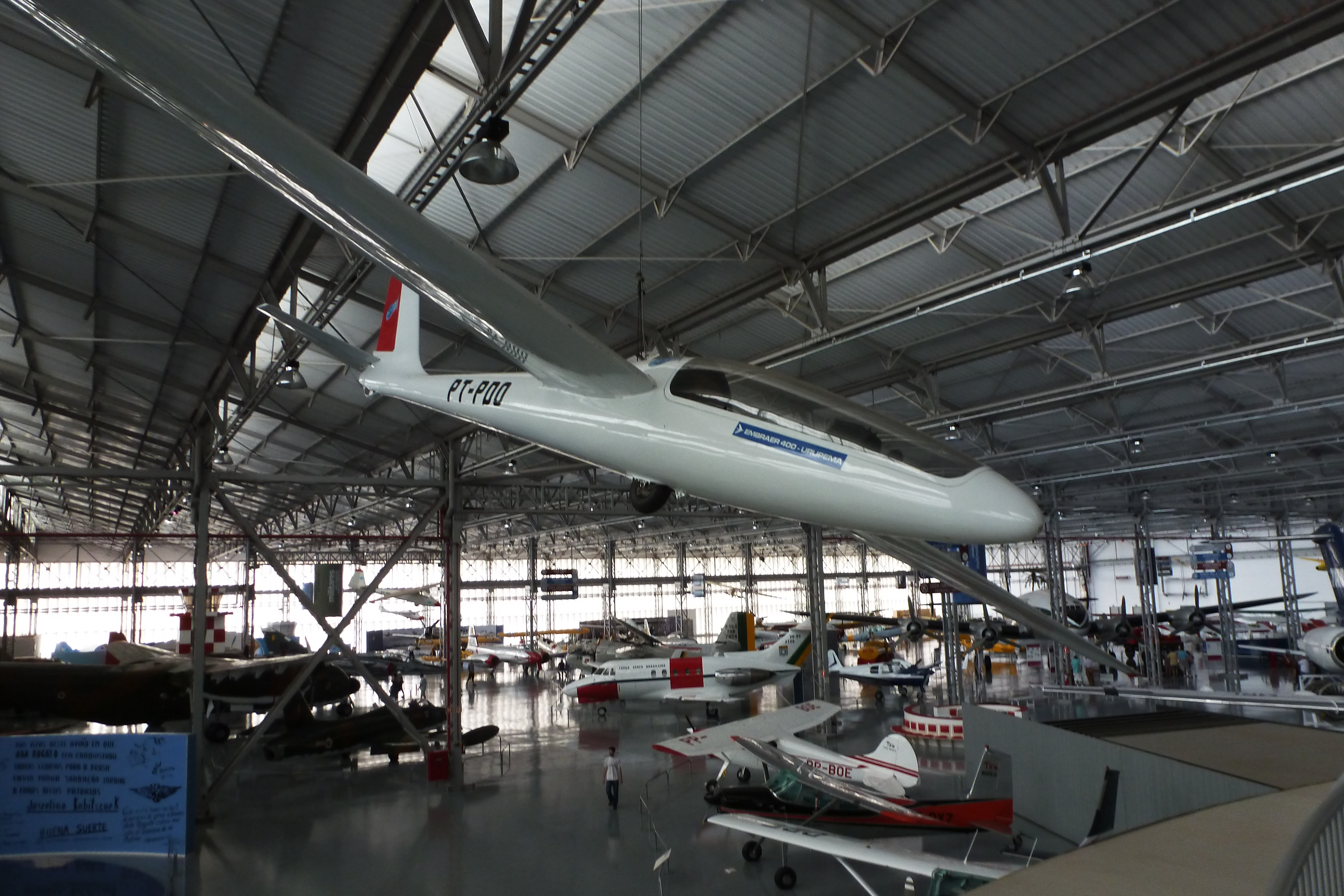
- EMB 400 Urupema in the TAM Museum in São Carlos, Brazil.

General information
- Type: Sailplane
- National origin: Brazil
- Manufacturer: IPD (Instituto de Pesquisas e Desenvolvimento); Embraer; IPE Aeronaves
- Designer: Guido Pessotti; Carlos del Monte; Edison Junqueira; Samuel Pires
- Number built: 11

History
- Introduction date: 1970
- First flight: 20 January 1968

The Embraer EMB 400 Urupema initially called IPD 6505 Urupema, is a Brazilian glider developed at Instituto Tecnológico de Aeronáutica, São José dos Campos, in 1964, and later produced by Embraer.

== Development ==
In 1964, a group of engineers led by Guido Fontegalante Pessotti began work on a high-performance glider, the IPD 6505 Urupema. The aircraft was intended to provide the best conditions for Brazilian pilots in world gliding championships. The prototype was started in 1965, but did not fly until 1968. In the same year, the prototype participated in the 1968 World Gliding Championships in Poland, and in 1970 in Marfa, Texas, where it won awards. Due to the excellent performance, the Ministry of Aviation, which wanted to provide the main domestic aeroclubs with new high-performance gliders, commissioned the newly founded Embraer aeronautical company to build 10 slightly modified examples in 1970, which were to be designated EMB-400 Urupema. The prototype was built by Pessotti, a Brazilian manufacturer of gliders.

=== Construction ===
The Urupema was designed as a shoulder-wing monoplane with a conventional tail unit. In front of the wings in the fuselage is the single-seat cockpit with a one-piece canopy. Under the fuselage there is a single wheel. The aircraft was a construction of wood, sandwich panels, foam plastics and with plywood planking.

== Variants ==
IPD 6505 Urupema
A prototype was built at IPD, developed by Guido Pessotti, at the request of the Institute of Aeronautics and Space. The good flight test results led to the project being taken to Embraer for a small series production. The prototype remained in use by the IPD Sailing Club for many years.
Super Urupema
Four examples were subsequently modified by IPE in such a way that a higher cockpit canopy was installed, as well as other seats that allowed the pilots to sit lying down, instead of almost lying down as before.

== Specifications (EMB 400 Urupema) ==
Data from Andrade 1997, p. 213

General characteristics

- Crew: One pilot
- Length: 7.45 m (24 ft 5 in)
- Wingspan: 15.00 m (49 ft 3 in)
- Height: 1.52 m (5 ft 0 in)
- Wing area: 17.2 m^{2} (185 sq ft)
- Empty weight: 230 kg (507 lb)
- Gross weight: 310 kg (683 lb)

Performance

- Maximum speed: 255 km/h (158 mph, 138 kn)
- Maximum glide ratio: best 36:1 at 95 km/h; 52 kn (59 mph)
- Rate of sink: 0.66 m/s (78 ft/min)
- Wing loading: 25.83 kg/m^{2} (5.29 lb/sq ft) maximum

== See also ==
- List of Brazilian gliders

Aircraft of comparable role, configuration, and era

- CEA-101 CB.1 Gaivota
- IPE Quero Quero
