= ACS-100 Sora =

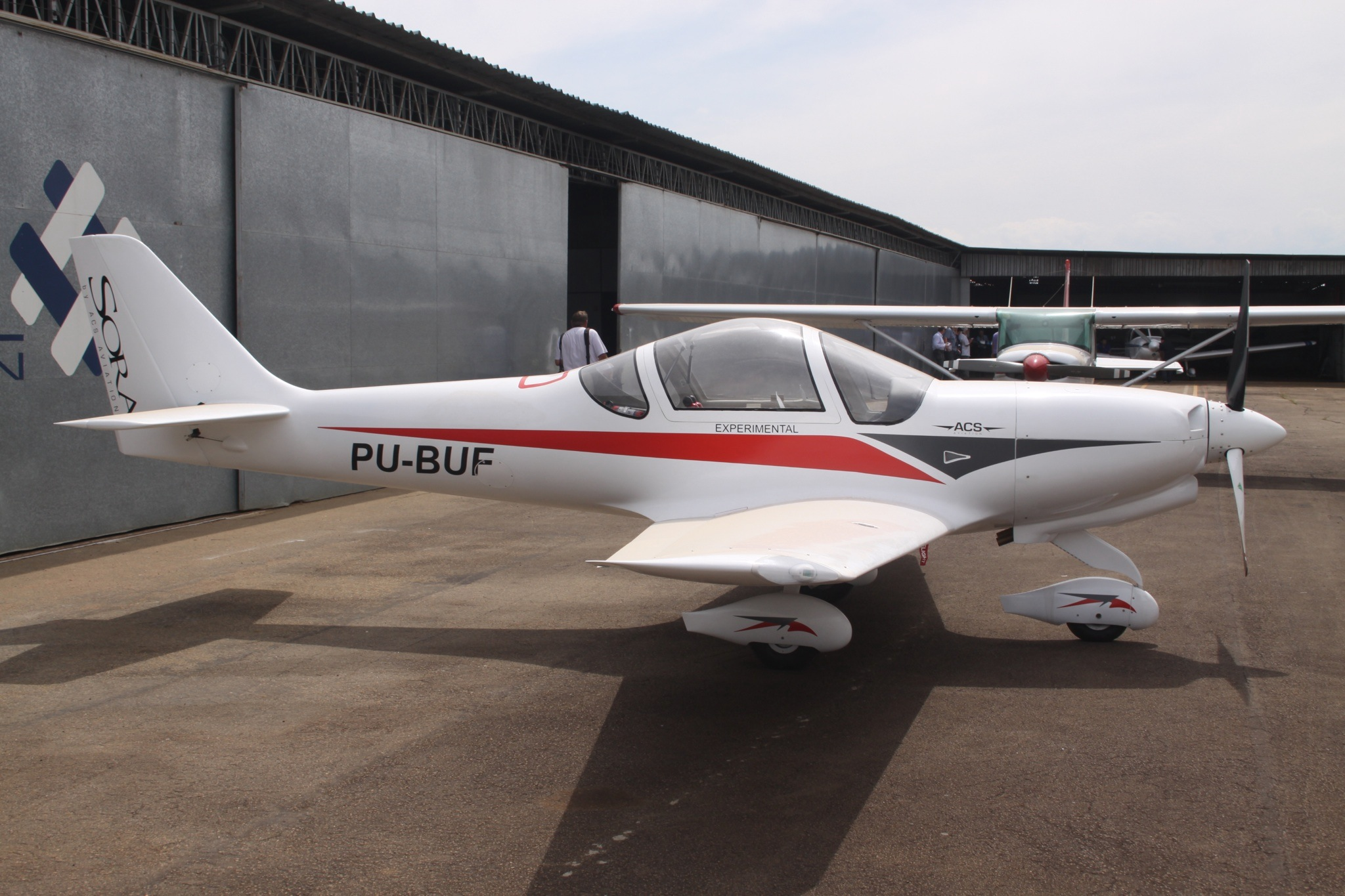
- ACS-100 Sora in São José dos Campos, Brazil

General information
- Type: Light sport aircraft
- Manufacturer: Advanced Composites Solutions
- Designer: Cláudio de Barros
- Status: In production (October 2021)
- Number built: 6 (January 2009)

History
- Introduction date: 2008
- First flight: June 2008
- Developed from: CEA-307 CB.10 Triathlon
- Developed into: ACS-Itaipu Sora-E

The ACS-100 Sora is a Brazilian two-seat Light Sport Aircraft, designed by Advanced Composites Solutions.

== Development ==
The Sora (originally designated the ACS-100 Triathlon) was developed from the CB-10 Triathlon project designed by the Brazilian aircraft designer Cláudio Barros of the Federal University of Minas Gerais. The Sora is a two-seat side-by-side all-composite low-wing cantilever monoplane with a conventional tail unit. It has a fixed tricycle landing gear with retractable gear as an option. It is designed to be fully aerobatic (+6g to −4g). The first flight was planned for May 2008 with delivery of the first aircraft planned for the first half of 2008.

== Specifications (ACS-100) ==
Data from and

General characteristics

- Crew: 2
- Length: 6.5 m (21 ft 4 in)
- Wingspan: 7.5 m (24 ft 8 in)
- Height: 2.0 m (66 ft 0 in)
- Wing area: 8.7 m^{2} (93.2 sq ft)
- Empty weight: 350 kg (772 lb)
- Gross weight: 600 kg (1,325 lb)
- Fuel capacity: 100 L
- Powerplant: 1 × Rotax 912S , 74 kW (100 hp)

Performance

- Maximum speed: 340 km/h (211 mph, 183 kn)
- Range: 500 km (3,107 mi, 2,700 nmi)
- Service ceiling: 3,700 m (12,170 ft)

== Related craft ==
The Sora-E is a two-seat electric powered aircraft. It is a joint venture between ACS Aviation of Brazil and Itaipu Binacional of Paraguay. The Sora-E is a side-by-side two seat low wing tri-cycle gear aircraft of composite construction. A Slovenian electric engine is powered by six lithium-ion polymer (LiPo) batteries.
