= IPT-2 Aratinga =

General information
- Type: Glider
- National origin: Brazil
- Manufacturer: Instituto de Pesquisas Tecnológicas
- Designer: Sílvio de Oliveira
- Number built: 1

History
- First flight: 1942

The IPT-2 Aratinga, was a Brazilian monoplane, single-seat glider designed and manufactured by the IPT engineers.

The glider had an outer covering of plywood and canvas, the cabin protected by a bubble canopy, a novelty at the time for gliders. The aircraft was ready a year and a half after the beginning of its construction, and was towed to Cumbica, where it underwent its first flight tests, conducted by Clay Presgrave do Amaral.

Once the tests were concluded, the Aratinga was towed by a de Havilland Tiger Moth aircraft to Rio de Janeiro, with stops made in São José dos Campos and Resende. There it was presented to the public countless times, until it was bought by a young engineer José Carlos de Barros Neiva, who kept a small repair shop at Manguinhos Airport. Flight to the end of the decade.

== Specifications ==
Data from Pereira de Andrade 1986, p. 52

General characteristics

- Crew: 1
- Capacity: 2
- Length: 5.25 m (17 ft 3 in)
- Wingspan: 10 m (32 ft 10 in)
- Wing area: 8.7 m^{2} (94 sq ft)
- Empty weight: 185 kg (408 lb)

Performance

- Stall speed: 55 km/h (34 mph, 30 kn)
- Never exceed speed: 130 km/h (81 mph, 70 kn)

== See also ==
- Maeda 703
- CVV-6 Canguro
- Zlin Z-25 Šohaj

Aircraft of comparable role, configuration, and era

- IPT-1 Gafanhoto
- IPT-3 Saracura
