= IPD Periquito =

Periquito
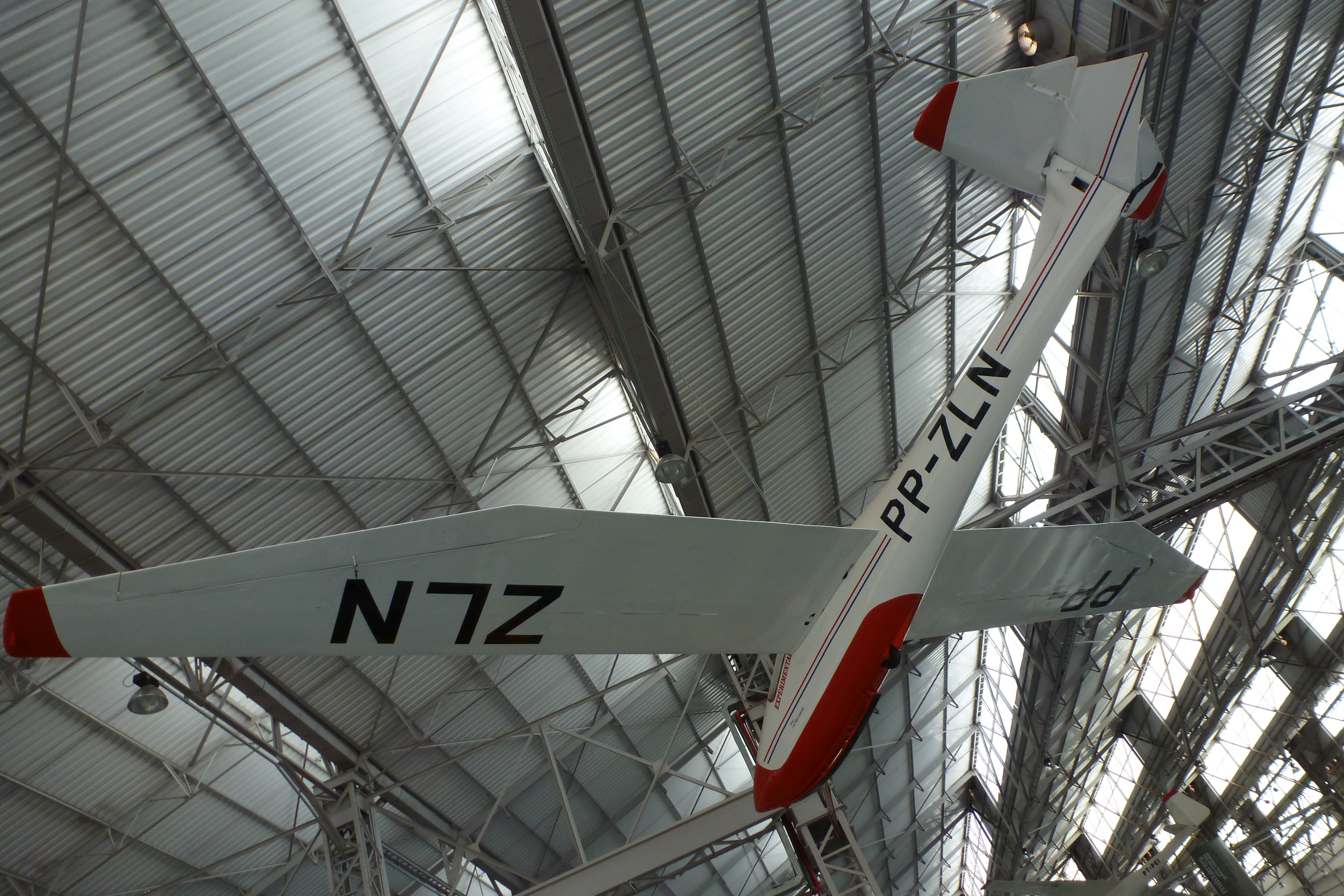
- Periquito II in the TAM Museum

General information
- Type: Sailplane
- National origin: Brazil
- Manufacturer: IPD (Instituto de Pesquisas e Desenvolvimento)
- Designer: Guido Pessotti
- Number built: 9

History
- Introduction date: 1959
- First flight: 1957

The IPD Periquito (Brazilian name for the parakeet bird), was a single-seat sailplane of high-wing construction designed in 1956 by Guido Pessotti in Brazil.

It had a wooden construction, with a plywood and canvas covering. Little conventional train, with fixed center skate and fixed drumstick, half-embedded. There was also a fixed skate on the tail.

== Variants ==
Periquito I
Developed at the Institute of Aeronautics and Space, São José dos Campos, São Paulo, was designed to fulfill the following requirements as indicated in order of priority. One built.
Periquito II
Evolution of the Periquito I, this glider made its first flight in 1957 and was put into production in 1959. Eight were built.

== Specifications (Periquito II) ==
Data from Taylor 1965, p. 361

General characteristics

- Crew: 1
- Length: 5.55 m (18 ft 3 in)
- Wingspan: 8 m (26 ft 3 in)
- Height: 1.05 m (3 ft 5 in)
- Wing area: 10.00 m^{2} (107.6 sq ft)
- Airfoil: Göttingen 549 at root Göttingen 676 at tip
- Empty weight: 90 kg (198 lb)
- Max takeoff weight: 180 kg (397 lb)

Performance

- Maximum speed: 160 km/h (99 mph, 86 kn)
- Maximum glide ratio: 17:1 at 75 km/h (47 mph)
- Rate of sink: 1.10 m/s (217 ft/min) at 70 km/h (43 mph)
- Wing loading: 17.8 kg/m^{2} (3.6 lb/sq ft)

== See also ==
- List of Brazilian gliders

Aircraft of comparable role, configuration, and era

- Neiva BN-1
- CVV-6 Canguro
- Zlin Z-25 Šohaj
