= Skua (disambiguation) =

Skua is a seabird in the family Stercorariidae.

Skua may also refer to:

- Blackburn Skua, a British dive-bomber/fighter plane from World War II
- Colonel Luis Arturo Rodríguez Meneses Air Base, a military base, with ICAO airport code SKUA, assigned to the Colombian Air Force
- Juvenelle Rosario Skua, Brazilian motorglider (aircraft)
- Orkney Skua, a British-manufactured sailing dinghy
- Skua Sailing Dinghy, a drop-keel two-person racing sailboat, designed for construction from plywood.
- Sea Skua, a British air-to-surface missile
- Skua (rocket), a British sounding rocket
- Denel Dynamics Skua, a South African high-speed target drone

== See also ==
- SCUA, the Scottish Conservative & Unionist Party
- Skewer (disambiguation)
