= HW-4 Flamingo =

Brazilian made aircraft

General information
- Type: Sailplane
- National origin: Brazil
- Manufacturer: Kurt Hendrich
- Designer: Hans Widmer
- Number built: 1

History
- First flight: 1946

The HW-4 Flamingo, was a Brazilian single-seat sailplane aircraft designed and manufactured for general flying.

== Design and development ==
The Flamingo was built in Bauru in 1944, designed by Kurt Henrich and Hand Widmer, it resembled the high-performance German gliders of the time. When designing it, Widmer chose a profile with little penetration, but high elevation index. He made more than 40 drawings, and it was with these that the team started the work. Despite the great performance at low speed, it was not adequate to consider it a racing sailplane. The wings profile were strong cambered. Lighter than contemporary German DFS Weihe, though of similar general dimensions.

=== Construction ===
It was made largely of domestic wood; the outside was made with plywood and painted linho.

== Operational history ==
It was based at the Aeroclube de Bauru while it was operational. He has won numerous Brazilian sailing championships, and several categories. It was retired for a structural reform in 2002 and continued flying until 2006. Its prefix was PT-PAY.

== Specifications ==
Data from Pereira de Andrade 1986, p. 101, Simons 2006, p. 26

General characteristics

- Crew: 1
- Length: 7.80 m (25 ft 7 in)
- Wingspan: 18 m (59 ft 1 in)
- Wing area: 18 m^{2} (190 sq ft)
- Aspect ratio: 18
- Airfoil: Göttingen 539
- Empty weight: 205 kg (452 lb)
- Max takeoff weight: 330 kg (728 lb)

Performance

- Maximum speed: 220 km/h (140 mph, 120 kn)
- Cruise speed: 104 km/h (64 mph, 56 kn)
- Maximum glide ratio: 1:28
- Rate of sink: 0.56 m/s (110 ft/min)
- Wing loading: 18.4 kg/m^{2} (3.8 lb/sq ft)

== See also ==
- List of gliders

Aircraft of comparable role, configuration, and era

- IPT-2 Aratinga
- Neiva B Monitor
- Rotter Nemere
