= Rio Claro Araponga =

Aircraft

Araponga

General information
- Type: Sailplane
- National origin: Brazil
- Manufacturer: Rio Claro Aero Club
- Designer: Sílvio de Oliveira
- Number built: 1

History
- First flight: 1985

The Rio Claro Araponga (Brazilian Portuguese name for the Neotropical bellbird), was a single-seat sailplane of high-wing.

== Design and development ==
In 1983, a group of aviators from the Rio Claro aero club decided to hire Sílvio de Oliveira, an aeronautical engineer, to develop a high performance monoplace glider. Initially it was planned to build two copies, the resources were pooled among the members. With classic lines and entirely built in native wood, with a plywood outer cover, it had conventional landing gear flaps formed by a fixed skid and a fixed roller, semi-embedded on the fuselage and fixed skid under the tail.

== Specifications ==
Data from Taylor 1986, p. 740, Pereira 1997, p. 360

General characteristics

- Crew: 1
- Length: 6.80 m (22 ft 4 in)
- Wingspan: 12.30 m (40 ft 4 in)
- Empty weight: 150 kg (331 lb)
- Max takeoff weight: 240 kg (529 lb)

Performance

- Stall speed: 69 km/h (43 mph, 37 kn)

== See also ==
- List of Brazilian gliders

Aircraft of comparable role, configuration, and era

- Shenyang X-9 Jian Fan
- Rolladen-Schneider LS6
