= IPD Urubu =

Aircraft

Urubu

General information
- Type: Sailplane
- National origin: Brazil
- Manufacturer: Aerotec S/A Indústria Aeronáutica
- Designer: IPD (Instituto de Pesquisas e Desenvolvimento)
- Number built: 1

History
- First flight: October 1979

The IPD Urubu (Brazilian-Portuguese name for the Vulture) also known as the IPD/PAR PE 80367, was a two-seat sailplane of high-wing.

== Design and development ==
In July 1978, the Ministry of Aeronautics asked IPD to develop a biplace glider to replace the LET L-13 Blaník, which was reaching the end of its service life. The work was executed by PAR (Divisão de Aeronaves) of the IPD. Development was completed in a few months and the prototype ordered from Aerotec, having been completed in 1979.

=== Construction ===
Monocoque construction, entirely made of metal, the new glider was baptized "Urubu", and underwent a series of tests that proved its efficiency in flight, being approved by the Civil Aviation Department. Biplace, in tandem-seat, had a bubble canopy, and a fixed auxiliary wheel, built into the fuselage.

== Specifications ==
Data from Taylor 1981, p. 586

General characteristics

- Crew: 1
- Length: 8.96 m (29 ft 5 in)
- Wingspan: 17.80 m (58 ft 5 in)
- Height: 2.00 m (6 ft 7 in)
- Wing area: 20.91 m^{2} (225.1 sq ft)
- Aspect ratio: 15:1
- Airfoil: NACA 63_{2}A-615 at root, NACA 63_{1}A-412 at tip
- Empty weight: 370 kg (816 lb)
- Max takeoff weight: 550 kg (1,213 lb)

Performance

- Maximum speed: 257 km/h (160 mph, 139 kn)
- Stall speed: 64 km/h (40 mph, 35 kn)
- Maximum glide ratio: 30:6 at 85 km/h (53 mph)
- Rate of sink: 0.70 m/s (138 ft/min) at 72 km/h (45 mph)
- Wing loading: 26.3 kg/m^{2} (5.4 lb/sq ft)

== See also ==
- List of Brazilian gliders

Aircraft of comparable role, configuration, and era

- Sidou João Grande
- IPE 02 Nhapecan
- Grob G102 Astir
