= IPE 06 Curucaca =

Brazilian light aircraft

General information
- Type: Light aircraft
- Manufacturer: Indústria Paranaense de Estruturas
- Designer: José Carlos Boscardin
- Number built: 18

History
- Introduction date: 1990/2004
- First flight: January 1990 / May 2003

The IPE 06 Curucaca (Brazilian name for the Buff-necked ibis bird) is a light aircraft built by the Brazilian manufacturer IPE Aeronaves.

== Design and development ==
In January 1990, the IPE 06 Curucaca, developed by IPE, flew for the first time. The aircraft is a two-seat truncated shoulder-wing aircraft and consists of a steel-tube fuselage covered with plastic fabric. Tandem seat, which can be entered through a door mounted on the right. The aircraft has a conventional tail unit and a non-retractable tailwheel landing gear.

IPE planned a towplane based on the IPE 06 under the designation IPE 07, which was to be lighter and more economical than the Paulistinha used by the aeroclubs. Using the structurally reinforced fuselage of the IPE 06, it was to be equipped with more powerful engines of 130 to 150 hp. For financial reasons, the project did not get beyond the initial planning stage.

An US-American investor provided funds in the early 2000s to allow IPE to return to aircraft manufacturing. The result was the IPE 06A, a significantly revised variant of the Curucaca with STOL capabilities.

== Variants ==
IPE 06U
A single-seat ultralight aircraft. Eight were built.
IPE 06A
A two-seat trimmed high-wing monoplane. The wings are planked with aluminum and the fuselage is partially clad with composite materials. The aircraft is powered by either a Lycoming O-235-C with 85 kW or an Lycoming O-360-A with 133 kW.

== Specifications ==
Data from Jane's All the World's Aircraft 1991-92

General characteristics

- Crew: One
- Capacity: Two
- Length: 6.30 m (20 ft 8 in)
- Wingspan: 9.90 m (32 ft 6 in)
- Height: 2.30 m (7 ft 7 in)
- Wing area: 13 m^{2} (140 sq ft)
- Empty weight: 224 kg (494 lb)
- Gross weight: 444 kg (979 lb)
- Powerplant: 1 × VK T2000 modified boxer engine, 52 kW (70 hp)
- Propellers: 2-bladed

Performance

- Maximum speed: 190 km/h (120 mph, 100 kn)
- Cruise speed: 120 km/h (75 mph, 65 kn)
- Range: 1,100 km (690 mi, 600 nmi)
