= Centro de Estudos Aeronáuticos da Universidade Federal de Minas Gerais =

Brazilian research organization

CEA-EEUFMG
- Centro de Estudos Aeronáuticos da Universidade Federal de Minas Gerais
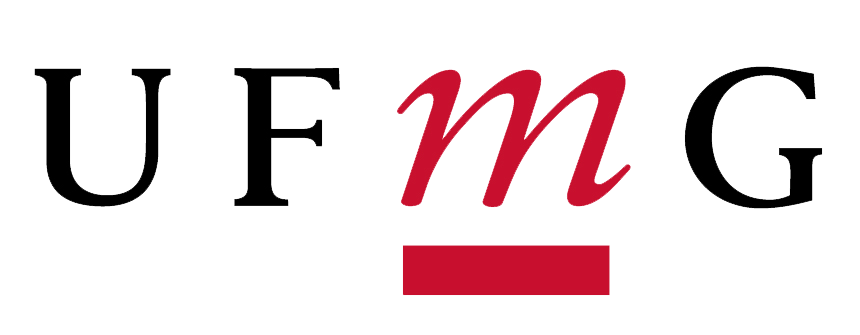
- Type: Public
- Established: 1964
- Affiliations: Universidade Federal de Minas Gerais
- Location: Belo Horizonte, Minas Gerais, Brazil

Centro de Estudos Aeronáuticos da Universidade Federal de Minas Gerais (in English: The Center for Aeronautical Studies) or simply CEA, is a Brazilian research organization part of the Department of Mechanical Engineering of the School of Engineering at the Federal University of Minas Gerais. It is similar to the Akafliegs of German Universities in that students make designs with advice from staff to give practical experience before seeking employment.

== History ==
The first project came in 1964 with the creation of the CB-1 basic instruction single-seat glider “Gaivota”. The Gaivota was a basic instruction glider, built in wood, from a simple project developed by the recently graduated engineer Cláudio de Barros. The whole project of this glider was developed with the help of the book L'aliante by the Italian engineer Stelio Frati, which until today shows its influences in the projects developed in this center.

After the success of the Gaivota, in 1969, the project for the CB-2 “Minuano” high-performance glider was started. Looking for equality with the machines that were being developed abroad, the then professor Cláudio de Barros, managed to design an aircraft that until today presents the highest aerodynamic performance of aircraft manufactured in the country. Built by José de Carvalho e Silva, the Minuano incorporated the most modern construction techniques at the time, such as metal-to-metal gluing, wood-to-metal gluing, and sandwich lining of plywood-cellulose acetate honeycomb. Its first flight was in December 1975.

In 1980 the RPR-1 "Jegue" a single-seat glider of the "self-launched" category was designed. The first prototype still under construction was destroyed by flooding that inundated the workshops of the Center for Aeronautical Studies.

In 1985 the development of the CB-7 "Vesper" biplace motor-glider began. This high performance aircraft was the first fully developed (national design, calculation and construction) in composite materials in the country. This project received support from the German aeronautical authorities (DLR). The first flight of the Vesper was in 1988. Today the prototype is available to the Center for Aeronautical Studies for research flights and flight tests.

Between 1989 and 1992 the state-of-the-art CB-9 "Curumim" ultralight aircraft was developed - the "Curumim" successfully flew in 1993. Currently, with more than 150 flight hours and over 600 landings, the Curumim has served as an excellent in-flight laboratory for testing new equipment and for initiating the Center for Aeronautical Studies' students in the practice of flight testing.

== Wind Tunnels ==
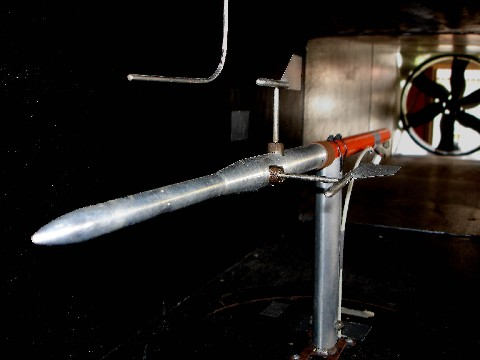
CEA-WT1 wind tunnel test rig

Subsonic Wind Tunnel - CEA-WT1
Wind tunnel designed and developed at the UFMG's Center for Aeronautical Studies with the purpose of supporting research activities in flight testing, especially sensor calibration, as well as supporting the teaching of applied aerodynamics at undergraduate and graduate levels. The construction of the tunnel was entirely done in the workshops of the Aeronautical Studies Center in 2005.
CEA-WT2 Subsonic Wind Tunnel
Closed-circuit wind tunnel for research and product development, was funded by FAPEMIG through its call for large equipment acquisition. It will have two test sections with 1.2x1.0x3.2m and 2.4x2.4x2.0m, with respective speeds of 120m/s and 40m/s. It is driven by an electronically controlled 385hp electric motor. Its construction is in its final stage of execution and the civil work for its installation is already being finished. The forecast for inauguration is December 2011.

== Minas Gerais Facilities ==
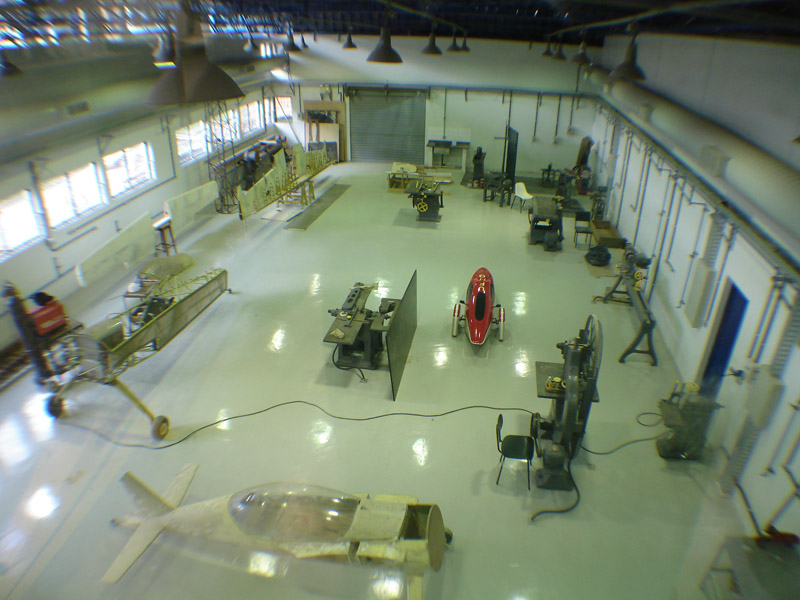
View of the CEA's workshop

The UFMG Aeronautical Studies Center Hangar is located in Conselheiro Lafaiete, 96 km from Belo Horizonte. It has a hangar area of 1,000-square-metre (11,000 sq ft).

== Aircraft ==
Summary of aircraft built by CEA
| Model name | First flight | Number built | Type |
|---|---|---|---|
| CEA-101 CB.1 Gaivota | 1964 | 1 | Single seat glider |
| CEA-102 CB.2 Minuano | 1975 | 1 | Single seat glider |
| CEA-104 RPR.1 Jegue | | | Self-Launched glider |
| CETEC-303 CB.7 Vesper | 1988 | 1 | Two seat glider |
| CEA-205 CB.9 Curumim | 1999 | 1 | Fixed-wing ultralight aircraft |
| CEA-307 CB.10 Triathlon | | | Two seat sports aircraft |
| CEA-308 | 2002 | 1 | Single-seat aerobatic aircraft |
| CEA-309 Mehari | 2009 | 1 | Single-seat aerobatic aircraft |
| CEA-311 Anequim | 2014 | 1 | Single-seat aerobatic aircraft |
| CEA-312 CB.12 Curumim II | | | Fixed-wing ultralight aircraft |

== See also ==
- Advanced Composites Solutions
