= CEA-309 Mehari =

General information
- Type: Sports aircraft
- National origin: Brazil
- Manufacturer: CEA-EEUFMG
- Number built: 1

History
- First flight: 2009

The CEA-309 Mehari is a Brazilian single-seat, monoplane sports aircraft developed by CEA.

== Design and development ==
In 2003 the project was started, with the participation of numerous engineers and students. The wing and empennage assembly was first made of wood for the aerodynamic testing process. The fuselage was made of steel tubes, welded with the gas tungsten arc welding process.

The airplane has received a Lycoming engine, and its propellers are from MT-Propeller, and the avionics are from Harman Becker Automotive Systems. FIBRAER, a Brazilian aeronautical company, supplied all the hardware.

The first flight took place in Conselheiro Lafaiete, on August 5, 2009.

== Specification ==
General characteristics

- Crew: 1
- Length: 5.87 m (19 ft 3 in)
- Wingspan: 6.10 m (20 ft 0 in)
- Wing area: 9.97 m^{2} (107.3 sq ft)
- Aspect ratio: 5.87
- Empty weight: 370 kg (816 lb)
- Gross weight: 510 kg (1,124 lb)
- Powerplant: 1 × Lycoming four-cylinder, 160 kW (210 hp)
- Propellers: 3-bladed MT-Propeller

Performance

- Cruise speed: 367 km/h (228 mph, 198 kn)
- Stall speed: 105 km/h (65 mph, 57 kn)
- Endurance: 2 h
- g limits: ±11
- Rate of climb: 15 m/s (3,000 ft/min)
- Wing loading: 67 kg/m^{2} (14 lb/sq ft)

== See also ==
- List of aerobatic aircraft
