= CEA-308 =

General information
- Type: Sports aircraft
- National origin: Brazil
- Manufacturer: CEA-EEUFMG
- Designer: Paulo Iscold
- Number built: 1

History
- First flight: 2002

The CEA-308 is a Brazilian sports aircraft designed by Professor Dr. Paulo Iscold, that beat four FAI World Records with pilot Gúnar Armin Halboth.

== Design and development ==
The CEA-308, is an aircraft composed of fiberglass and wood, covered by extruded polystyrene foam plates. The wing spar is made of freijó, manufactured in plywood. A 64 HP Rotax 532 engine was used for flight tests, and later on a 100 HP engine and a three-blade propeller, both built by Hirth, were installed, enabling the aircraft to reach speeds of up to 400 km/h. After some time it was decided to replace the system with a Jabiru engine and new propellers by Catto Propellers, which allowed the aircraft to break four FAI World Records and remain installed to this day.

== Records ==
- Time to Climb to 3,000 Meters: 8 min 15 sec.
- Speed Over a 15 Kilometer Course: 329.1 km/h
- Speed Over a 100 Kilometer Closed Course: 326.8 km/h
- Speed Over a 3 Kilometer Course: 360.13 km/h

== Specification ==
General characteristics

- Crew: 1
- Length: 4.86 m (15 ft 11 in)
- Wingspan: 5.76 m (18 ft 11 in)
- Wing area: 4.74 m^{2} (51.0 sq ft)
- Empty weight: 205 kg (452 lb)
- Gross weight: 300 kg (661 lb)
- Powerplant: 1 × Jabiru 2200 , 60 kW (80 hp)
- Propellers: 3-bladed Hirth

Performance

- Cruise speed: 307 km/h (191 mph, 166 kn)
- Stall speed: 85 km/h (53 mph, 46 kn)
- Rate of climb: 6.7 m/s (1,320 ft/min)
- Wing loading: 63 kg/m^{2} (13 lb/sq ft)

== See also ==
- List of aerobatic aircraft
