= CETEC-303 CB.7 Vesper =

Brazilian motor glider

General information
- Type: Motor glider
- National origin: Brazil
- Manufacturer: CEA-EEUFMG; CETEC
- Designer: Cláudio de Barros; Armin Quast
- Number built: 1

History
- First flight: 1988

The CETEC-303 CB.7 Vesper is a Brazilian motor glider designed by Cláudio de Barros.

== Design and development ==
Built from glassfibre, the Vesper is a low-wing cantilever monoplane with conventional landing gear and a T-tail with a tandem seat. Powered by front-mounted 80 hp Limbach L2000 with 80 HP. A bubble-like cabin with ample visibility. It used two domestically manufactured propellers. It was developed with the intention of producing hundreds, but due to the Brazilian crisis in the late 1980s, the idea was put aside.

== Specification ==
Data from Pereira 1997, p. 76

General characteristics

- Crew: 2
- Length: 7.97 m (26 ft 2 in)
- Wingspan: 17.87 m (58 ft 8 in)
- Wing area: 17.14 m^{2} (184.5 sq ft)
- Empty weight: 620 kg (1,367 lb)
- Max takeoff weight: 800 kg (1,764 lb)
- Powerplant: 1 × Limbach L2000 , 60 kW (80 hp)
- Propellers: 2-bladed Nacional

Performance

- Cruise speed: 224 km/h (139 mph, 121 kn)
- Stall speed: 78 km/h (48 mph, 42 kn)
- Range: 1.320 km (0.820 mi, 0.713 nmi)
- Rate of climb: 4.3 m/s (850 ft/min)
- Wing loading: 45 kg/m^{2} (9.2 lb/sq ft)

== See also ==
Related development

- Aeromot AMT-100 Ximango

== Bibliography ==
- Pereira, Roberto (1997). Enciclopédia de Aviões Brasileiros. São Paulo: Editora Globo. ISBN 9788525021373.
