= CEA CB.2 Minuano =

CB.2 Minuano
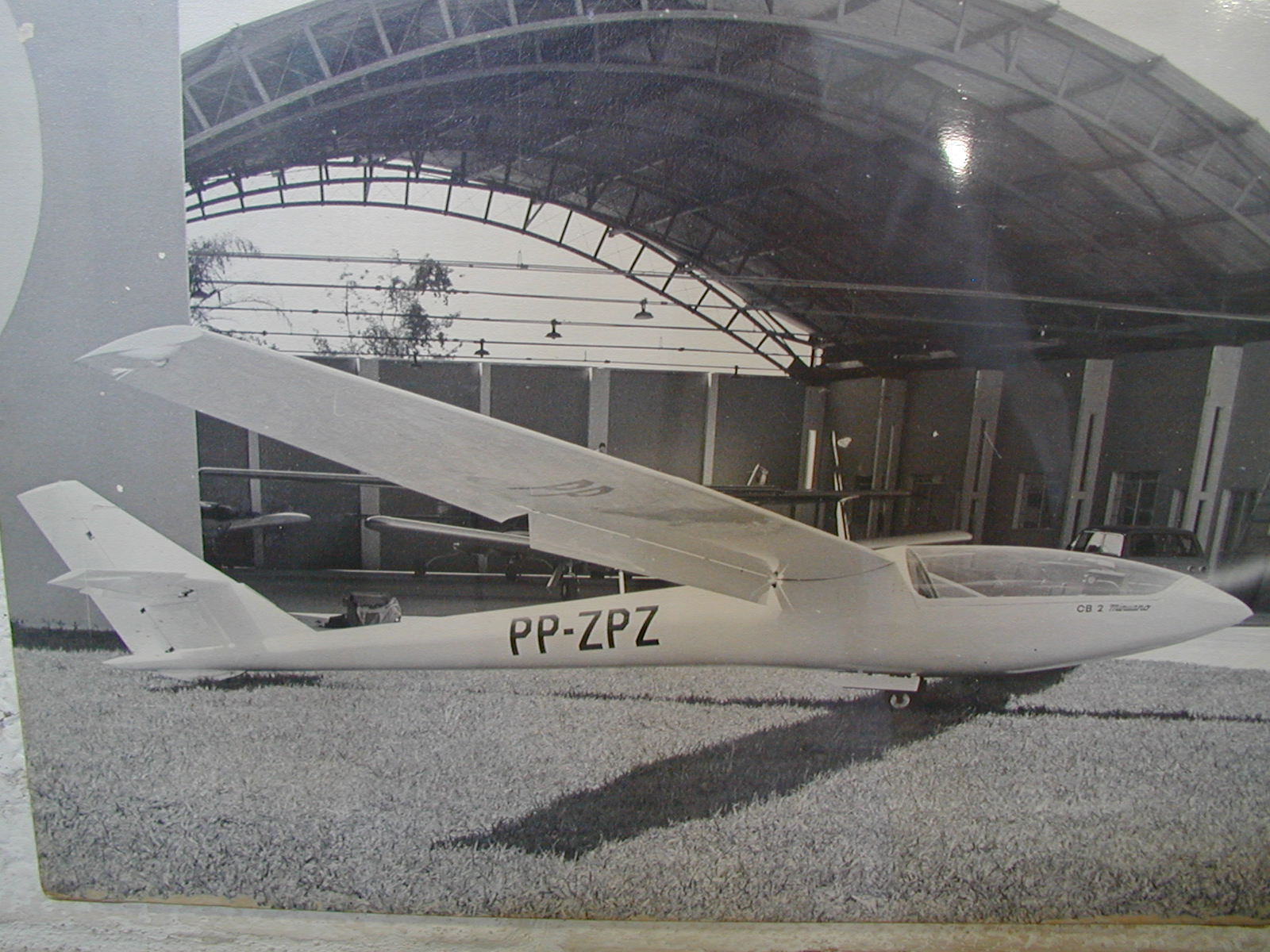

General information
- Type: High performance sailplane
- National origin: Brazil
- Manufacturer: CEA-EEUFMG
- Designer: Claudio de Barros
- Number built: 1

History
- First flight: 1975

The CEA 102 CB.2 Minuano (Minuano - South-West wind) is a high performance sailplane designed by Claudio Barros and developed by the Centro de Estudos Aeronáuticos - (centre for aeronautical studies) at the Escola de Engenharia da Universidade Federal de Minas Gerais (EEUFMG) - (School of Engineering at the Federal University of Minas Gerais) in Brazil between 1969 and 1975.

== Design and development ==
Motivated by the knowledge acquired through experience with the Gaivota, the design of the Minuano began, becoming the most efficient sailplane designed and built in Brazil (L/Dmax=38), making use of flaps, retractable landing gear, as well as combining aluminium, wood, and cellulose acetate honeycomb in its structure. In 1975, the first prototype Minuano made its first flight testas a cornerstone for the establishment of the aeronautical engineering course at UFMG.

== Operational history ==
The sole Minuano flew regularly with the university gliding club until a disastrous flood in 1980 caused the wall of the CEA workshop to collapse, crushing the Minuano, of which nothing was salvaged.

== Specifications (variant specified) ==
Data from Sailplanes 1965 - 2000

General characteristics

- Crew: 1
- Length: 7 m (23 ft 0 in)
- Wingspan: 15 m (49 ft 3 in)
- Wing area: 10.22 m^{2} (110.0 sq ft)
- Aspect ratio: 22.05
- Airfoil: Wortmann FX61-163 (centre section), Wortmann FX60-126 (tip)
- Empty weight: 214 kg (472 lb)
- Gross weight: 304 kg (670 lb)

Performance

- Stall speed: 60 km/h (37 mph, 32 kn)
- Never exceed speed: 260 km/h (160 mph, 140 kn)
- Maximum glide ratio: 38 at 90 km/h (56 mph)
- Rate of sink: 0.9 m/s (180 ft/min)
- Wing loading: 29.82 kg/m^{2} (6.11 lb/sq ft)
