= IPE Aeronaves =

Airplane manufacturer in the Brazil

- Company type: Private
- Industry: Aerospace
- Founded: August 1973, 22; 52 years ago
- Founder: João Carlos Boscardin
- Headquarters: Curitiba, Paraná (state), Brazil
- Key people: João Carlos Boscardin Filho (CEO)
- Products: Aircraft

Indústria Paranaense de Estruturas Ltda known as IPE Aeronaves, based in the neighborhood of Batel in Curitiba, Paraná (state), is an aircraft manufacturer specialising in gliders and general aviation.

== Aircraft ==
Summary of aircraft built by IPE
Model name	First flight	Number built	Type
IPE KW-1b Quero-Quero	1969	156	Single seat glider
IPE KW-2 Biguá	1974	1	Two seat glider
IPE 02 Nhapecan	1979	83	Single seat glider
IPE Elfe IV	1983	3	Single seat glider
IPE 03	1984	1	Single seat glider
IPE 04			Fixed-wing ultralight aircraft
IPE SB-2		2	Single seat glider
IPE Super Urupema		4	Two seat glider
IPE 06 Curucaca	1990	18	Fixed-wing ultralight aircraft
IPE 10 Agrícola			Single-seat agricultural aircraft
IPE 014			

== See also ==
- Indústria Aeronáutica Neiva
- Companhia Aeronáutica Paulista
- Indústria Paulista de Aeronáutica
