= Akaflieg Braunschweig SB-5 Danzig =

German single-seat glider, 1959

SB-5
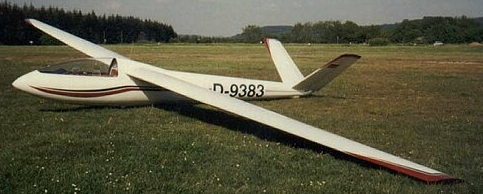
- SB-5b

General information
- Type: Single seat Standard Class glider
- National origin: West Germany
- Manufacturer: Fa Eichelsdörfer, Bamberg
- Number built: 100+

History
- First flight: 3 June 1959

The Akaflieg Braunschweig SB-5 is a German single-seat Standard Class sailplane designed and prototyped by students of Brunswick University. More than 100 were built to their design, in several different variants.

== Design ==
The Akaflieg Braunschweig or Akademische Fliegergruppe Braunschweig (English: The Brunswick Academic Flying Group) is one of some fourteen German undergraduate student flying groups attached to and supported by their home Technical University. Several have designed and built aircraft, often technically advanced and leading the development of gliders in particular.

The SB-5 is a cantilever shoulder-wing monoplane with a plywood monocoque fuselage which has an outer fibre glass skin, a single spar wooden wing with plywood skinning, and a V-tail. Its wing, with a constant chord centre section and tapered outer panels, has 2.50° of dihedral and Schempp-Hirth airbrakes at 50% chord. The pilot has an enclosed cockpit with a Plexiglass canopy and the landing gear is a non-retractable, unsprung monowheel with a tailskid.

The SB-5 prototype first flew on 3 June 1959. A licence to build it went to Firma Eichelsdörfer at Bamberg, who produced more than 100 including all variants. The first three variants, SB-5a-c detailed below, differed chiefly in their forward fuselages and canopy shapes and the last (SB-5e) by having an extended span

=== Airworthiness directives ===
Luftfahrt-Bundesamt, the national civil aviation authority of Germany, has issued two airworthiness directives concerning the structure of the tail section of this glider. Both related to issues with frame components towards the rear of the fuselage: the first, dated 30 January 1986, required an immediate inspection of frame 25 for cracking; the second, issued on 11 July 1991, required the gluing of frame 26 to be reinforced. The UK Air Accidents Investigation Branch cited these directives in its investigation of an accident in Cumbria, England, on 7 August 2019, when the tail section of a model SB-5e broke away in turbulent air conditions, causing the loss of the aircraft.

== Operational history ==
In 2010, there were thirty seven SB-5s on the German civil register and one each on the Belgian and UK registers. Of these, eighteen were SB-5bs, twenty SB-5es and one a SB-5c.

== Variants ==
SB-5a
Original version, with a short, tear drop style canopy proud of upper fuselage line. Braking parachute, no air brakes. Only one, crashed June 1961.
SB-5b
First production model. Lengthened forward fuselage with pilot in reclined seat under long canopy reaching forward almost to the nose and blended into fuselage line over wings. Airbrakes. Around 50 built.
SB-5c
Second production model. Shorter canopy not reaching nose, ground clearance raised by placing monowheel in short fairing rather than directly within fuselage. Some GRP in fuselage. About 10 built. First flown 1965.
SB-5d
SB-5e
16 m (52 ft 6 in) span to meet Club Class rules. Entered production 1974, with at least 20 built.
IPE SB-2
Between 1970 and 1980 two were built under license using local wood by IPE Aeronaves.

== Aircraft on display ==
- Auto und Technik Museum, Sinsheim, Germany - SB-5b Sperber D-5480.

== Specifications (SB-5c) ==
Data from Jane's All the World's Aircraft 1966/7

General characteristics

- Crew: One
- Length: 6.6 m (21 ft 8 in)
- Wingspan: 15.00 m (49 ft 3 in)
- Wing area: 13.00 m^{2} (139.9 sq ft)
- Aspect ratio: 17.3
- Airfoil: NACA 63_{3}618
- Empty weight: 220 kg (485 lb) equipped
- Max takeoff weight: 325 kg (717 lb)

Performance

- Maximum speed: 200 km/h (120 mph, 110 kn) smooth air
- Stall speed: 60 km/h (37 mph, 32 kn)
- Maximum glide ratio: best 32.5:1 at 77 km/h; 42 kn (48 mph)
- Rate of sink: 0.63 m/s (124 ft/min) minimum at 66 km/h; 37 kn (41 mph)
- Wing loading: 23.1 kg/m^{2} (4.7 lb/sq ft) maximum

== See also ==
Related lists

- List of gliders
