= Skewer (disambiguation) =

Skewer may refer to:

- Skewer, a thin metal or wood stick used to hold small pieces of food together
- Skewer (chess), a chess tactic
- Quick release skewer, a mechanism for attaching a wheel to a bicycle
- The Skewer, BBC radio comedy programme

== See also ==
- Skua (disambiguation)
