= Schubert P-1 =

2000s Brazilian sailplane

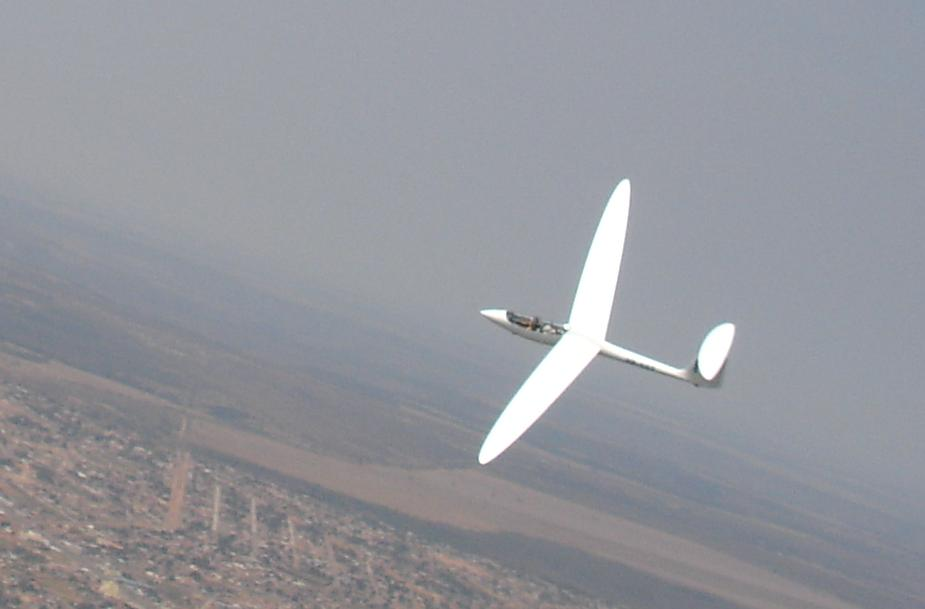
- P-1 flying over Luziânia, 2008.

General information
- Type: Sailplane
- National origin: Brazil
- Designer: Ekkehard Schubert
- Number built: 1

History
- First flight: 3 Mar 2002
- Developed from: ITA P-1

The Schubert P-1 is a sailplane produced in Brazil, designed by the aeronautical engineer Ekkehard Schubert.

== Design and development ==
The fuselage construction is made of FRP, in single shell, with two caverns for fixing the wing and the landing gear. The fuselage structure includes the drift structure, whose surface is made of FRP and PVC foam sandwich. The rear spar of the drift, with FRP tables (uni-directional fabric or roving) and FRP sandwich core supported by PVC foam, closes the entire structure. The wing-fuselage connection is made by means of the two caverns, in which the half-wings are connected by means of two wing-wing connecting pins.

The three-dimensional geometry of the fuselage cabin is derived from a two-dimensional profile, accommodated in the flow of the wing. Negative camber at -1.7 m, at the wing tip, measured at the aileron articulation axis. Schempp-Hirth brakes on the extrados.

The first flight of the P1 was on March 3, 2002, at CTA in São José dos Campos.

== Specifications ==
General characteristics

- Crew: 2
- Length: 8.3 m (27 ft 3 in)
- Wingspan: 16.5 m (54 ft 2 in)
- Height: 1.74 m (5 ft 9 in)
- Wing area: 16.01 m^{2} (172.3 sq ft)
- Airfoil: NACA 66_{3}-018 at root NACA 66_{2}-015 at tip
- Empty weight: 320 kg (705 lb)
- Gross weight: 520 kg (1,146 lb)

Performance

- Maximum speed: 156 km/h (97 mph, 84 kn)
- Maximum glide ratio: 1:33
- Rate of sink: 0.6 m/s (120 ft/min)
- Wing loading: 32.0 kg/m^{2} (6.6 lb/sq ft) maximum

== See also ==
- Instituto Tecnológico de Aeronáutica

Aircraft of comparable role, configuration, and era

- Juvenelle Rosario Skua
