= IPT-6 Stratus =

Stratus

General information
- Type: Sailplane
- National origin: Brazil
- Manufacturer: Instituto de Pesquisas Tecnológicas
- Designer: Johannes Lepper
- Number built: 1

History
- First flight: 1944

The IPT-6 Stratus, was a high-performance two-seat, high-wing sailplane.

== Design and development ==
Stratus was conceived soon after its predecessor IPT-5 Jaraguá, created by Estonian engineer Johannes Lepper, who himself made the first flight of this sailplane.

=== Construction ===
It was built with the fuselage caves were made of guapuruvu and freijó, and the bird ribs were also made of freijó. The outer skin was made of pine plywood from paraná pine. The few metal sheets were chrome-molybdenum steel plates and tubes, 1/8-inch diameter flexible steel cables, and uprights also of chrome-molybdenum steel.

== Specifications ==
Data from Pereira de Andrade 1986, p. 123

General characteristics

- Crew: 1
- Length: 6.80 m (22 ft 4 in)
- Wingspan: 15 m (49 ft 3 in)
- Empty weight: 160 kg (353 lb)
- Gross weight: 250 kg (551 lb)

Performance

- Maximum speed: 120 km/h (75 mph, 65 kn)
- Wing loading: 15.64 kg/m^{2} (3.20 lb/sq ft)

== See also ==
- List of Brazilian gliders

Aircraft of comparable role, configuration, and era

- IPT-5 Jaraguá
- CVV-6 Canguro
