= IPT-1 Gafanhoto =

- The IPT-1 circa 1942 before flying.

General information
- Type: Glider
- National origin: Brazil
- Manufacturer: Instituto de Pesquisas Tecnológicas
- Designer: Frederico Abranches Brotero
- Number built: 2

History
- First flight: 1942

The IPT-1 Gafanhoto (Brazilian-Portuguese name for the grasshoppers), was a Brazilian single-seat, monoplane glider aircraft designed and manufactured for general flying.

== Design and development ==
The IPT-1 was designed by engineer Frederico Abranches Brotero, and christened by him, with a name that matched its attitude in flight, since it was developed for short flights, towed in the launch by a car. The decision to make it incapable of executing long, high-altitude flights was motivated by making it an ideal piece of equipment for practicing and observing beginners by their instructors.

=== Construction ===
Completely wooden structure, it had an open fuselage cabin. Fuselage and wings extremely covered with canvas and plywood. It had fastening uprights under the wings, a central slider along the entire fuselage. It was completed in 1942, and flew regularly in São Paulo for more than two years. The wings were deployed 20 cm higher than originally planned. Because of this, the IPT-1 used to crash when the landing was not done well. In flight, however, it reacted correctly to commands.

== Specifications ==
Data from Pereira de Andrade 1986, p. 50

General characteristics

- Crew: 1
- Length: 5.40 m (17 ft 9 in)
- Wingspan: 15.35 m (50 ft 4 in)
- Wing area: 15.3 m^{2} (165 sq ft)
- Empty weight: 115 kg (254 lb)
- Gross weight: 205 kg (452 lb)

Performance

- Maximum speed: 120 km/h (75 mph, 65 kn)

== See also ==
- Elliotts Primary EoN
- I.Ae. 41 Urubú
- Neiva B Monitor

Aircraft of comparable role, configuration, and era

- CAP Saracura
- Schneider Grunau Baby
