= Santa Cruz do Sul S.C.S.1 =

1920 Brazilian single-seat sailplane

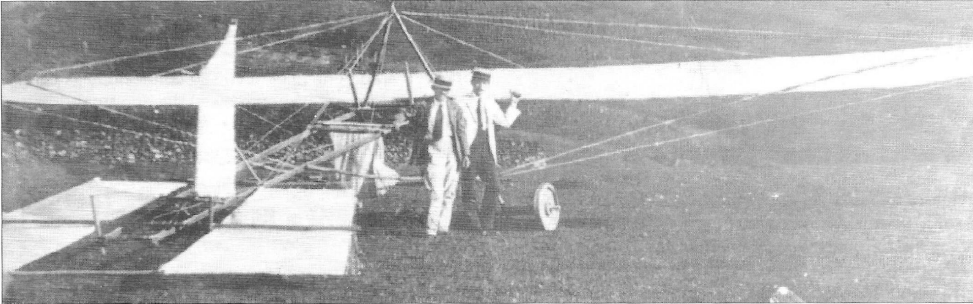
- The S.C.S.1 glider before its first flight, in 1920.

General information
- Type: Glider
- National origin: Brazil
- Designer: Rudolf Lohre; Gustav Wenneeck
- Number built: 1

History
- First flight: 1920

The S.C.S.1 was a 1920s Brazilian single-seat sailplane of high-wing construction, manufacturer at Santa Cruz do Sul, Rio Grande do Sul.

== Development ==
In mid-1919, Rudolf Lohre and Gustav Wenneeck, two Germans living in Rio Grande do Sul, acquired a German magazine with plans of several German gliders of the time, and used it as a basis for the creation of a glider. With technical help from Luiz Sthal and Oscar Adolphs, and financial help from the brothers Hoezel and Helmuth Dreher. The aircraft was ready in January 1920.

It had a pinho and taquara structure. The tests were made in Henrique Filter's farm, only a single flight was registered, on January 26 of the same year, when the aircraft flew 20 meters at a height of 5 meters.

This was the first flight of a glider in South America.

== See also ==
Related lists

- List of gliders
