= Advanced Composites Solutions =

Engineering company based in São Paulo, Brazil

- Company type: Private
- Industry: Aerospace
- Founded: 2006; 20 years ago
- Headquarters: São José dos Campos, São Paulo, Brazil
- Key people: Alexandre Zaramela

Advanced Composites Solutions, commonly shortened to ACS is an engineering company specialized in composite materials technology, mainly their application to the development and construction of light aircraft.

== History ==
Founded by professionals with vast accumulated experience in the international aeronautic industry, the company is located in the city of São José dos Campos in the Brazilian aeronautic cluster. Besides engineering services the main current activity of ACS is the production of the ACS-100 Sora, a two-seat light sport aircraft

ACS is also involved in the development and integration of Unmanned Aircraft Systems through its subsidiary flight Solutions.

== Aircraft ==
Summary of aircraft built by ACS
Model name	First flight	Number built	Type
ACS-100 Sora	2008		Two-seat light sport aircraft
ACS-Itaipu Sora-E	2015		Electric motor light sport aircraft
ACS Z-300			
ACS-500 Long			
