= IPE 02 Nhapecan =

1970s Brazilian sailplane

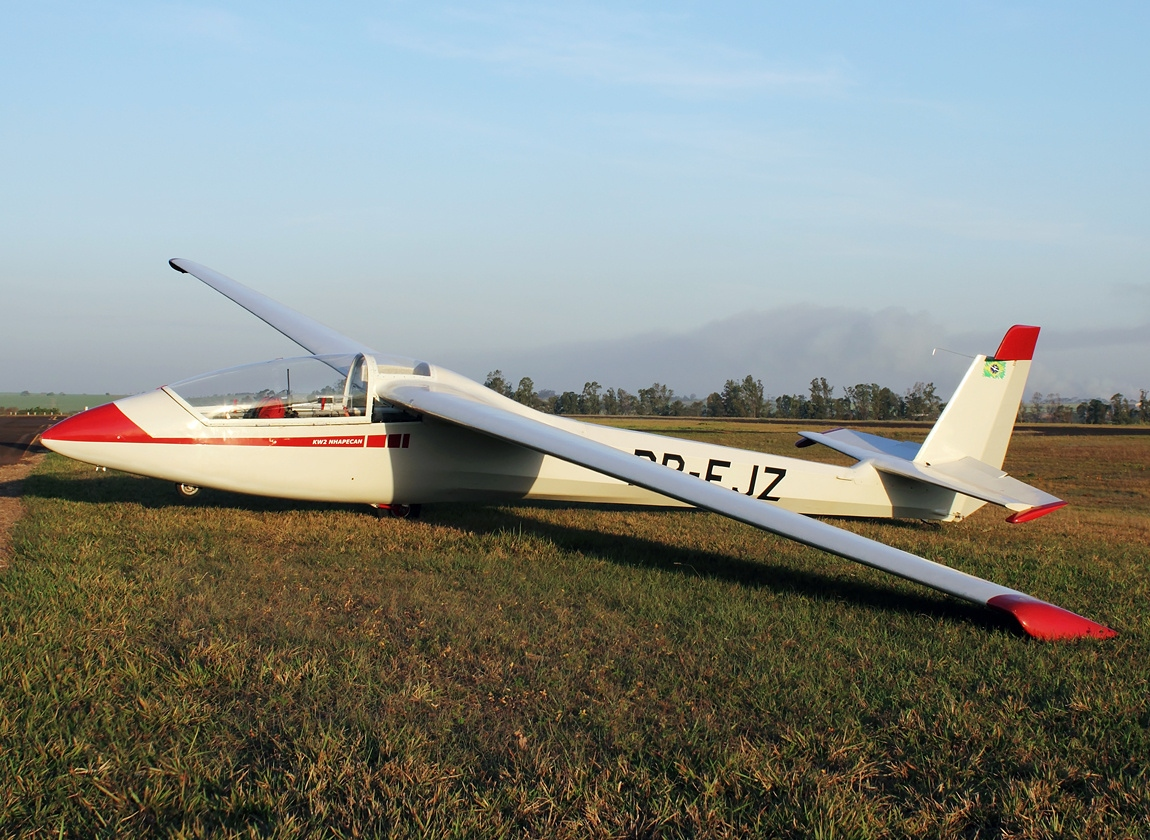

General information
- Type: Sailplane
- National origin: Brazil
- Manufacturer: IPE Aeronaves
- Designer: João Carlos Boscardin
- Number built: 02 Nhapecan I 80 Nhapecan II; 01 Nhapecan III

History
- Introduction date: 1986
- First flight: 24 May 1979/1983/1990

The IPE 02 Nhapecan is a sailplane that was produced in Brazil in the 1970s and 1980s. It is a conventional, two seat design of wooden construction.

== Design and development ==
During works on the IPE KW-2 Biguá, IPE they decided to develop a new two-seater model based on the Biguá. First of all, conventional instead of negatively swept wings were designed, as well as a new nose and other small details. The first flight of the new aircraft as IPE 02a Nhapecan was on May 24, 1979. After extensive testing, the prototype was sold and continued to fly for many years.

The IPE 02 Nhapecan was a two-seat glider with tandem seats and an enclosed cockpit. The fuselage was made of welded steel tubes and was covered with plywood. The wings were of wooden construction and covered with fabric. Under the fuselage was a single wheel. The fuselage was made of welded steel tubes and covered with fiberglass-reinforced plastic. As with the initial model, the wings were a wooden construction covered with fabric. Under the fuselage was a small wheel at the nose and a larger wheel in the center. In addition, there were structural modifications and fixed ballast.

== Variants ==
=== IPE 02A Nhapecan I ===
First prototype of the glider family, which flew for the first time on May 24, 1979 with registration PP-ZQL. At least two prototypes produced, did not make it into series production.

=== IPE 02B Nhapecan II ===
Primary instructional model, certified in 1986, with 80 produced by the 1990.

=== IPE Nhapecan III ===
Prototype of an improved version of version II, it did not make it into series production. A built prototype.

== Operators ==
Brazil

- Brazilian Air Force – 10 IPE 02 Nhapecan II

== Specifications (Nhapecan II) ==
Data from FHNW-IWI

General characteristics

- Crew: One pilot
- Length: 8.54 m (28 ft 0 in)
- Wingspan: 16.6 m (54 ft 6 in)
- Height: 1.90 m (6 ft 3 in)
- Wing area: 17.2 m^{2} (185 sq ft)
- Empty weight: 340 kg (750 lb)
- Gross weight: 540 kg (1,190 lb)

Performance

- Maximum speed: 200 km/h (120 mph, 110 kn)
- Maximum glide ratio: 32
- Rate of sink: 0.65 m/s (128 ft/min)

== See also ==
- IPE Aeronaves

Aircraft of comparable role, configuration, and era

- Schleicher Ka 6
