= Maeda 703 =

Japanese glider

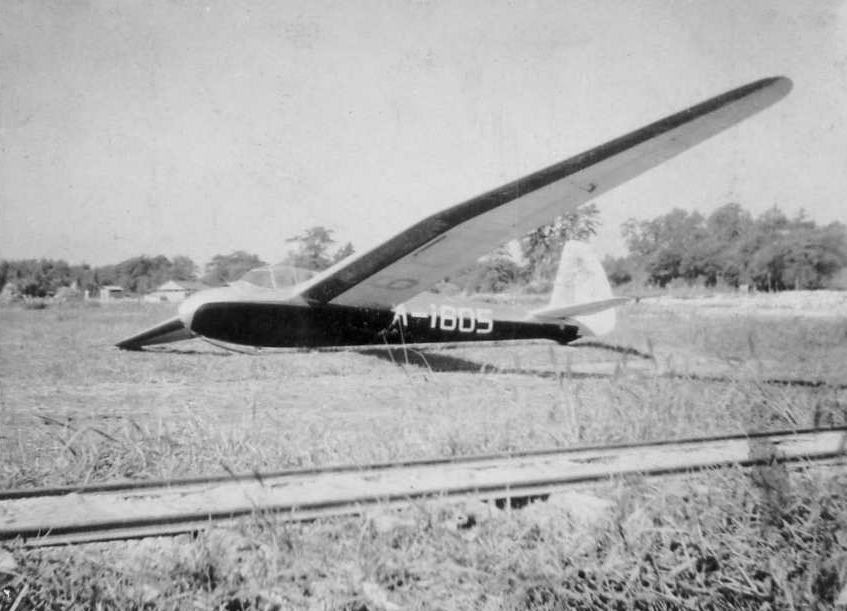
- First prototype

General information
- Type: Single-seat glider
- National origin: Japan
- Designer: Kenichi Maeda
- Number built: 3

History
- First flight: 1940

The Maeda 703 was one of the first indigenous Japanese gliders, a high performance single seat aircraft which first flew in 1940. Three were built, two with gull wing wings; one of these set a national endurance record in 1941.

== Design and development ==
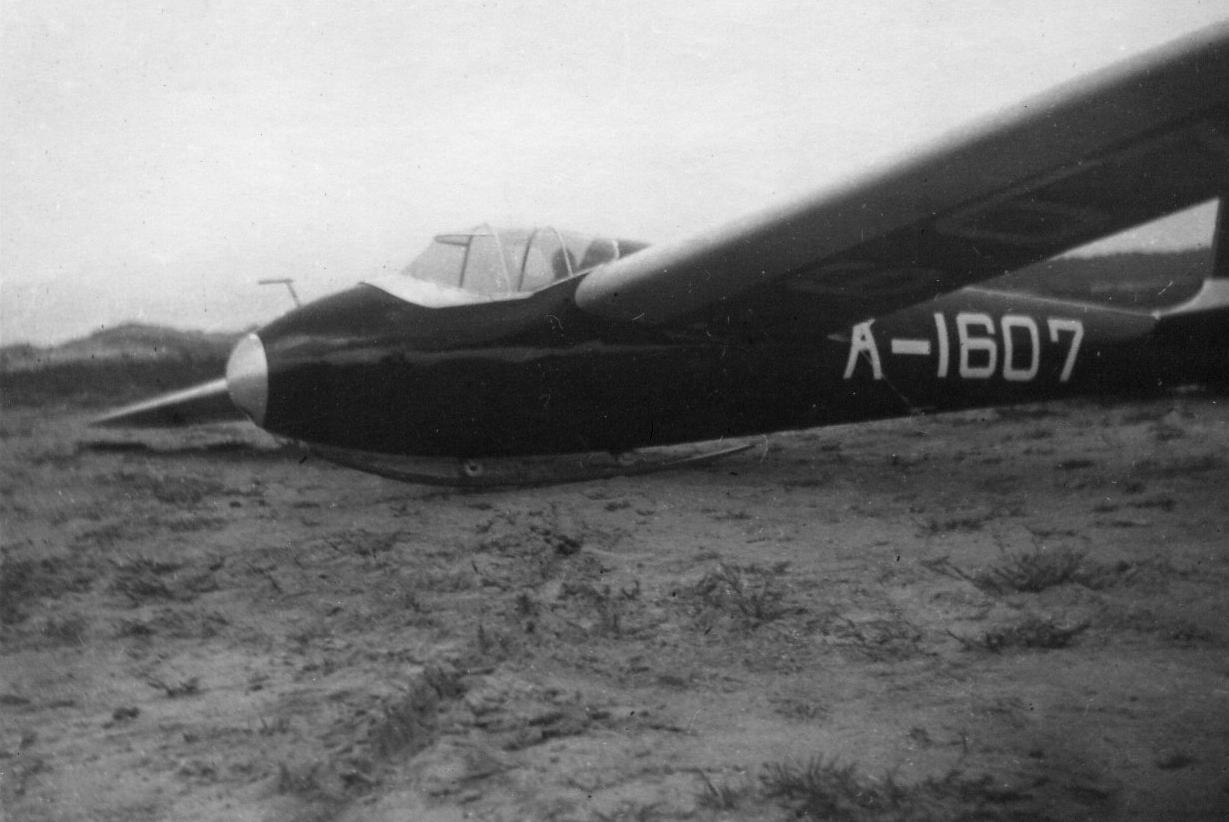
Third 703: straight, not gull, wing

Gliding had attracted little interest In Japan until the mid-1930s, when a group of enthusiasts managed to fund a visit from Wolf Hirth. His tour of Japan with two gliders and a tow plane generated imports of German gliders, copies of them and eventually true Japanese designs. The Maede 703, built by Kenichi Maede, his engineering colleagues Kimura and Kurahara and with academic input from Hiroshi Sato from Kyushu Imperial College was one of the first of the latter.

The 703 was a wood-framed aircraft covered with a mixture of plywood and fabric. Its cantilever mid-mounted wing had a single spar and an associated D-box, skinned in plywood, formed the leading edge. The wing was fabric covered behind the spar. The leading edge was straight from root to tip, with slight sweep-back. From root out almost to half-span the wing tapered in plan only gently but further out, where the trailing edge was entirely formed by the aileron the wing tapered more strongly to a rounded tip. The NACA-derived airfoil provided a high maximum lift coefficient and small pitching moments and the wing had washout to avoid tip stall. There were Schempp-Hirth style airbrakes mounted on the rear of the spar in the central section, extending above and below the wing. On the first two 703s the central sections were set with strong (6.5°) dihedral and the outer section with none, forming a gull wing. The third 703 had the same wing but with constant dihedral from root to tip.

The fuselage of the 703 was entirely ply skinned, tapering gently from a blunt nose to the tail. There, a small, ply skinned fin carried a largely fabric covered, rounded, wide chord, balanced rudder which extended down to the keel. The straight tapered tailplane, also largely fabric covered, was set forward of the fin and at the top of the fuselage, so the elevators required only a small cut-out for the rudder to move in. The pilot sat upright just ahead of the wing leading edge under a multi-piece canopy which merged into the aft fuselage. The 703 had no landing wheel but just a sprung skid from the nose to behind the cockpit, on the deepest part of the fuselage. It was assisted by a tail bumper.

Early tests, beginning in 1940 revealed good handling and performance.

== Operational history ==
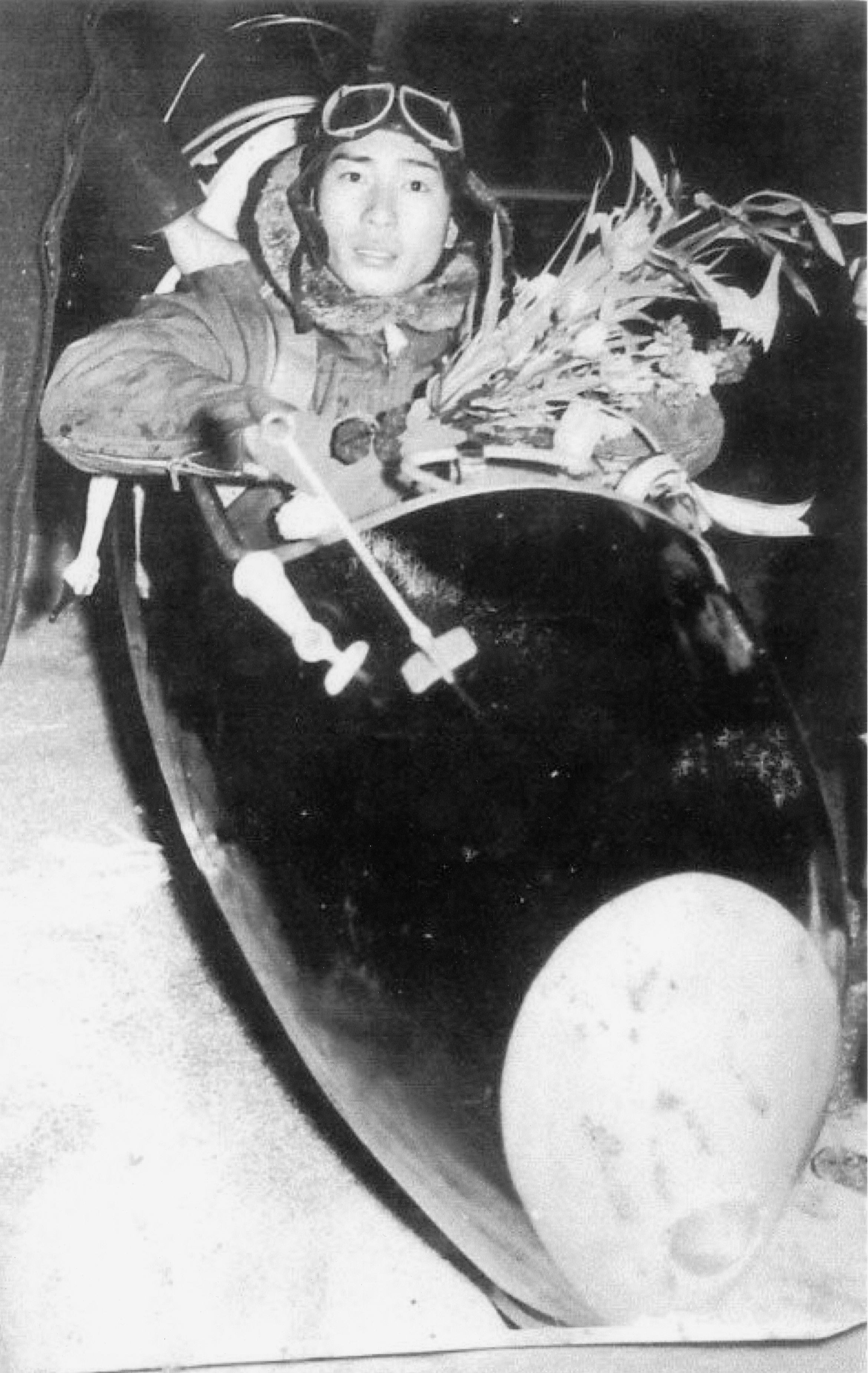
Tadeo Kawabe in the 703 after landing in the dark at the end of his record flight.

Development of the Maeda 703 was stopped by the spread of World War II to the Pacific, but not before Tadeo Kawabe had set a new national glider endurance record of 13 h 41 m in February 1941 in the second 703, A1606. In 1945 all gliders in Japan, along with most in Germany, were destroyed by Allied forces.

== Specifications ==
Data from Sailplanes 1920-1945

General characteristics

- Crew: One
- Length: 6.70 m (22 ft 0 in)
- Wingspan: 14.98 m (49 ft 2 in)
- Height: 1.10 m (3 ft 7 in) over cockpit
- Wing area: 14.3 m^{2} (154 sq ft)
- Aspect ratio: 15.7
- Airfoil: MKK3 (developed from NACA 64016 by Maede, Kinushi and Kuahara )
- Empty weight: 153 kg (337 lb) structure
- Gross weight: 230 kg (507 lb) maximum

Performance

- Maximum glide ratio: 25.4:1 at 64.5 km/h (40 mph; 34.8 kn)
- Rate of sink: 0.63 m/s (124 ft/min) minimum, at 55 km/h (34.2 mph; 29.7 kn)
- Wing loading: 16.1 kg/m^{2} (3.3 lb/sq ft)
- Landing speed: 43 km/h (26.7 mph; 23.2 kn)
