= Chengdu X-7 Jian Fan =

X-7 Jian Fan

General information
- Type: Basic training glider
- National origin: People's Republic of China
- Manufacturer: Chengdu Sailplane Factory
- Number built: 130+

History
- First flight: October 1966

The Chengdu X-7 Jian Fan (English: Sword Point) (X-7 - Xianji-7 - glider-7) is a Chinese basic trainer glider. First flying in 1966, at least 130 were built.

== Design and development ==
The Chengdu X-7 is a two-seat basic training glider of glass-fibre construction, which first flew in October 1966. It is a high-winged monoplane with the wing braced to the pod-and-boom fuselage by single struts. The crew of two sit in tandem open cockpits, while the undercarriage is a non-retractable monowheel, with nose- and tailskids. 130 had been built by 1980.

== Specifications (X-7) ==
Data from Jane's All The World's Aircraft 1988–89

General characteristics

- Crew: two, pilot and student
- Length: 7.06 m (23 ft 2 in)
- Wingspan: 13.07 m (42 ft 11 in)
- Height: 1.60 m (5 ft 3 in)
- Wing area: 18.00 m^{2} (193.8 sq ft)
- Aspect ratio: 9.5:1
- Airfoil: Göttingen 535 (modified)
- Empty weight: 220 kg (485 lb)
- Max takeoff weight: 370 kg (816 lb)

Performance

- Stall speed: 45 km/h (28 mph, 24 kn)
- Never exceed speed: 150 km/h (93 mph, 81 kn) in smooth air

100 km/h (54 kn; 62 mph) in rough air
80 km/h (43 kn; 50 mph) on winch launch

- g limits: +4 -2
- Maximum glide ratio: 12:1
- Rate of sink: 1.40 m/s (276 ft/min) at 53 km/h (29 kn; 33 mph)
- Wing loading: 20.55 kg/m^{2} (4.21 lb/sq ft) at max t/o weight
