= IPT-5 Jaraguá =

General information
- Type: Sailplane
- National origin: Brazil
- Manufacturer: Instituto de Pesquisas Tecnológicas
- Designer: Romeu Corsini
- Number built: 1

History
- First flight: 1941

The IPT-5 Jaraguá, was a Brazilian sailplane aircraft designed with two seats in a tandem-seat configuration for general flying.

== Design and development ==
Due to the war, all aircraft designers focused on new developments to achieve better performance for fighter aircraft, including the Instituto de Pesquisas Tecnologicas from 1940. The institute's chief engineer, Romeu Corsini, worked with Clay Presgrave do Amaral, a glider design specialist, to develop an experimental sailplane that had a novel wing profile. By mid-1941, work on it had been completed and the first flight took place. From 1941, the aircraft was used for numerous tests over the next ten years.

The IPT-5 had a circular fuselage with a largely glazed aerodynamic nose containing the enclosed cockpit with two side-by-side seats. The aircraft was of wooden construction and was partly covered with paraná pine and partly with varnished linho. The IPT-5 was larger than any glider built in Brazil up to that time. The aircraft was designed as a mid-wing monoplane with a conventional tailplane and had a single wheel under the fuselage.

== Specifications ==
Data from Pereira de Andrade 1986, p. 120

General characteristics

- Crew: 1
- Length: 7.2 m (23 ft 7 in)
- Wingspan: 17 m (55 ft 9 in)
- Height: 1.43 m (4 ft 8 in)
- Wing area: 16 m^{2} (170 sq ft)
- Empty weight: 197 kg (434 lb)
- Max takeoff weight: 357 kg (787 lb)

Performance

- Maximum speed: 160 km/h (99 mph, 86 kn)
- Stall speed: 55 km/h (34 mph, 30 kn)
- Maximum glide ratio: 1:28
- Rate of sink: 0.67 m/s (132 ft/min)

== See also ==
- List of gliders

Aircraft of comparable role, configuration, and era

- IPT-6 Stratus
- Antonov A-9
