= Shenyang HU-2 Petrel =

Chinese self-launching motor glider

HU-2 Petrel

General information
- Type: Motor-glider
- National origin: China
- Manufacturer: Shenyang Sailplane Factory

The Shenyang HU-2 Petrel is a Chinese self-launching motor-glider built by the Shenyang Sailplane Factory at Shenyang.

== Design ==
The Petrel is a two or three-seat self-launching motor-glider made from wood and fabric that looks like a conventional high-wing monoplane. It is powered by a front-mounted 80 hp (60 kW) Limbach L 2000 E01 piston engine.

== Specifications ==
Data from Brassey's World Aircraft & Systems Directory 1996

General characteristics

- Crew: 2 or 3
- Length: 7.02 m (23 ft 0 in)
- Wingspan: 14.92 m (43 ft 11 in)
- Wing area: 19.63 m^{2} (211.3 sq ft)
- Aspect ratio: 11.34
- Empty weight: 485 kg (1,069 lb)
- Gross weight: 750 kg (1,653 lb)
- Powerplant: 1 × Limbach L 2000 E01 piston engine , 60 kW (80 hp)

Performance

- Maximum speed: 135 km/h (84 mph, 73 kn)
- Stall speed: 60 km/h (37 mph, 32 kn)
