= IPE KW-2 Biguá =

1970s Brazilian sailplane

General information
- Type: Sailplane
- National origin: Brazil
- Manufacturer: IPE Aeronaves
- Designer: Kuno Widmaier
- Number built: 1

History
- First flight: 19 December 1974

The IPE KW-2 Biguá (Brazilian name for the neotropic cormorant bird) is a sailplane that was produced in Brazil in the 1974.

== Development ==
The KW.2 Biguá, an experimental glider, was designed by aeronautical engineer Kuno Widmaier and built jointly by Industria Paranaense de Estruturas and the Aeroclubs of Novo Hamburgo. The two-seat aircraft first flew on December 19, 1974. When the ANAC ordered the IPE Quero Quero, orders for the Biguá were also considered, but ultimately dropped in favor of the IPE 02 Nhapecan. The single machine was used at Novo Hamburgo until 2000.

The aircraft had a fuselage of welded steel tubes with a conventional tail unit and wings of a wooden construction. The aircraft was partially planked with plywood and covered with fabric, the wings were negatively swept. The pilots sat one behind the other in the enclosed cockpit. Under the fuselage was a skid and a single wheel.

== Specifications ==
General characteristics

- Crew: One pilot
- Length: 7.9 m (25 ft 11 in)
- Wingspan: 17.8 m (192 ft 0 in)
- Height: 1.34 m (4 ft 5 in)
- Empty weight: 260 kg (573 lb)
- Gross weight: 470 kg (982 lb)

Performance

- Maximum speed: 80 km/h (49.71 mph, 43.20 kn)

== See also ==
- Kuno Widmaier
- IPE Aeronaves
