= Lie-Fang 1 =

General information
- Type: Two seat intermediate glider
- National origin: Chinese People's Republic
- Manufacturer: Tchan-Tia-Kou manufacturing centre, Shenyang
- Designer: J. Niespal

History
- First flight: 10 May 1958

The Lie-Fang 1 (English: Liberation 1), some sources Jeifang 1, was one of the first gliders designed and built in China, though with Polish design input. It is an all-wood, two seat, intermediate training aircraft which first flew in 1958.

== Design and development ==
Polish glider experience played a significant part in the establishment of the activity in the young People's Republic of China. Polish aircraft were imported and some were built in China. The design of the Lie-Fang, one of the first gliders to originate in China, was led by the Polish J. Niespal. He was assisted by two Chinese engineers, Tchen-Kuei-Wen and Li-Ti-Tuin. Niespal had worked at the SZD (Experimental Sailplane Institute) in Poland, where the Mucha series was designed, and he used the 1953 SZD-12 Mucha 100 as a starting point. There were many differences between the Mucha and the Lie-Fang, partly because the latter was a two-seat aircraft and therefore longer, with a much modified nose and more strongly forward-swept wings; the Lie-Fang's fuselage was a simpler, flat sided structure compared with the Mucha's oval section monocoque and the empennage was more angular.

The Lie-Fang is wood framed, with some use of the local "poton" wood and with a mixture of plywood and fabric covering. It has a high mid mounted single spar wing with a plywood covered torsion box leading edge, Behind the spar the wing is fabric covered. In plan it is straight tapered with unswept leading edges, resulting in forward sweep of 2° at one quarter chord. There is 4° of dihedral and 2° of washout. Its ailerons are slotted and fabric covered and spoilers, mounted behind the spar at about one third span, open above and below the wing.

The fuselage is a flat sided monocoque which tapers gently to the rear, with the straight tapered tailplane mounted on top of it and forward of the fin. The rear surfaces are fabric covered. The straight edged rudder extends to the keel and moves in a cut-out between the elevators, one of which has a trim tab. The cockpit, mostly ahead of the wing leading edge, seats pupil and instructor in tandem with a single set of instruments that they can both see. The fixed, two part forward canopy reaches almost to the nose; a rear transparent section opens sideways for access to both seats. The Lie-Fang lands on a fixed monowheel undercarriage under the wing, fitted with brakes and aided by a short, rubber sprung nose skid and a tail bumper.

The Lie-Fang made its first flight on 10 May 1958. It was cleared for cloud flying and classed as semi-aerobatic. It went into production and was used an intermediate trainer, preparing students for their first solo flights in Chinese built Mucha 100s.

== Specifications ==
Data from Jane's All the World's Aircraft 1962-63 The World's Sailplanes:Die Segelflugzeuge der Welt:Les Planeurs du Monde Volume II

General characteristics

- Crew: Two
- Length: 8.00 m (26 ft 3 in)
- Wingspan: 15.00 m (49 ft 3 in)
- Height: 1.35 m (4 ft 5 in)
- Wing area: 18.5 m^{2} (199 sq ft)
- Aspect ratio: 12.4
- Airfoil: Göttingen 549 over most of the span, NACA 4412 at tip
- Empty weight: 242 kg (534 lb) equipped
- Max takeoff weight: 420 kg (926 lb)

Performance

- Stall speed: 55 km/h (34 mph, 30 kn)
- Never exceed speed: 165 km/h (103 mph, 89 kn)
- Rough air speed max: 138 km/h (85.7 mph; 74.5 kn)
- Aerotow speed: 140 km/h (87.0 mph; 75.6 kn)
- Winch launch speed: 100 km/h (62.1 mph; 54.0 kn)
- Terminal velocity: with full airbrakes 165 km/h (103 mph; 89 kn)
- g limits: +4.5
- Maximum glide ratio: 22:1 at 86 km/h (53.4 mph; 46.4 kn)
- Rate of sink: 0.8 m/s (160 ft/min) minimum, at 62 km/h (38.5 mph; 33.5 kn)
- Wing loading: 22.8 kg/m^{2} (4.7 lb/sq ft)
