= Shenyang HU-1 Seagull =

Type of aircraft

HU-1 Seagull

General information
- Type: Motor-glider
- National origin: China
- Manufacturer: Shenyang Sailplane Factory

The Shenyang HU-1 Seagull is a Chinese powered glider built by the Shenyang Sailplane Factory at Shenyang.

== Design ==
The Seagull is a two-seat powered glider made from aluminium alloy with parts also made of wood, glassfibre and fabric. It has an overwing mounted 116 hp (87 kW) Lycoming O-235-N2A engine.

== Specifications ==
Data from Brassey's World Aircraft & Systems Directory 1996

General characteristics

- Crew: 2
- Length: 7.62 m (25 ft 0 in)
- Wingspan: 17 m (55 ft 10 in)
- Wing area: 17.68 m^{2} (190.3 sq ft)
- Aspect ratio: 16.35
- Empty weight: 600 kg (1,323 lb)
- Gross weight: 1,050 kg (2,315 lb)
- Powerplant: 1 × Lycoming O-235-N2A piston engine , 86 kW (116 hp)

Performance

- Maximum speed: 225 km/h (140 mph, 120 kn)
- Stall speed: 85 km/h (53 mph, 46 kn)
- Maximum glide ratio: 20
- Rate of sink: 1.5 m/s (4.92 ft/min)
