= Shenyang X-9 Jian Fan =

X-9 Jian Fan

General information
- Type: Glider
- National origin: China
- Manufacturer: Shenyang Sailplane Factory
- Primary user: People's Liberation Army Air Force

The Shenyang X-9 Jian Fan (English: Sword Point X-9 - Xianji-9 - glider-9) is a Chinese training glider built by the Shenyang Sailplane Factory at Shenyang.

== Design ==
The Jian Fan glider is a tandem two-seat braced high-wing monoplane made from aluminium alloy and wood. It was allocated the designation X-9 by the People's Liberation Army Air Force.

== Specifications ==
Data from Brassey's World Aircraft & Systems Directory 1996 Jane's All The World's Aircraft 1988–89

General characteristics

- Crew: 2
- Length: 7.335 m (24 ft 1 in)
- Wingspan: 14.42 m (47 ft 4 in)
- Height: 2.32 m (7 ft 7 in)
- Wing area: 18.9 m^{2} (203 sq ft)
- Aspect ratio: 11
- Empty weight: 230 kg (507 lb)
- Max takeoff weight: 380 kg (838 lb)

Performance

- Stall speed: 44 km/h (28 mph, 24 kn)
- Never exceed speed: 150 km/h (93 mph, 81 kn) in smooth air

100 km/h (54 kn; 62 mph) in rough air
120 km/h (65 kn; 75 mph) on aero-tow
100 km/h (54 kn; 62 mph) on winch launch

- Maximum glide ratio: 17:1 at max t/o weight
- Rate of sink: 0.96 m/s (189 ft/min) at 53 km/h (29 kn; 33 mph)
- Wing loading: 20.1 kg/m^{2} (4.1 lb/sq ft) max

== See also ==
Related lists

- List of gliders
- List of Chinese aircraft
