= Neiva BN-1 =

BN-1

General information
- Type: Competition single seat sailplane
- National origin: Brazil
- Manufacturer: Neiva
- Designer: José de Carlos de Barros Neiva
- Number built: 3

History
- First flight: 1955

The Neiva BN-1 was a high performance single seat sailplane designed in Brazil in the 1950s. It had national records, competition success, and went into production for club use.

== Design and development ==
The BN-1 was a conventionally laid out wooden single seat glider, with a high mounted cantilever wing. This had an aspect ratio of 19 and was built around a single I-section spar with 2° of dihedral. The leading edge and upper surface was formed from plywood, the underside fabric covered. The ailerons were wooden framed with fabric covering; the spoilers were wooden. The fuselage was a wooden monocoque with the cockpit and its moulded Plexiglas canopy just ahead of the leading edge. Behind the wing the fuselage was quite slender, carrying the cantilever tailplane just above it on a slight step. The vertical tail had a largely straight, slightly raked leading edge, with a small fuselage fillet and a rounded tip turning into a broad, curved edged rudder. The tail surfaces were all wood framed and fabric covered. The BN-1 landed on a forward skid and a retractable monowheel just aft of the centre of gravity

== Operational history ==
The BN-1 went into production for the Brazilian government-run National gliding clubs. It was placed first at the second National Soaring competition. At the third National Soaring competition, four BN-1s took first, second, third and fifth places against twelve European and US aircraft. The BN-1 also set three Brazilian records, including a 332 km (206 mi) goal flight.

== Specifications (BN-1) ==
Data from Jane's All the World's Aircraft 1956/7 The World's Sailplanes:Die Segelflugzeuge der Welt:Les Planeurs du Monde

General characteristics

- Crew: 1
- Length: 6.90 m (22 ft 8 in)
- Wingspan: 16.0 m (52 ft 6 in)
- Height: 1.02 m (3 ft 4 in)
- Wing area: 13.47 m^{2} (145.0 sq ft) gross
- Aspect ratio: 19
- Airfoil: NACA 4415 at root, NACA 4412 at mid-span and NACA 2R1 12 at tip
- Empty weight: 180 kg (397 lb)
- Max takeoff weight: 270 kg (595 lb)

Performance

- Stall speed: 48 km/h (30 mph, 26 kn)
- Never exceed speed: 220 km/h (140 mph, 120 kn)
- g limits: +5.3 -3.33 at 150 km/h (93.2 mph; 81.0 kn)
- Maximum glide ratio: best, 1:30 at 78 km/h (48.5 mph; 42.1 kn)
- Rate of sink: 0.6 m/s (120 ft/min) minimum, at 62 km/h (38.5 mph; 33.5 kn)
- Wing loading: 20 kg/m^{2} (4.1 lb/sq ft)
