= IPE Quero Quero =

1970s Brazilian sailplane

IPE Kw-1b Quero Quero
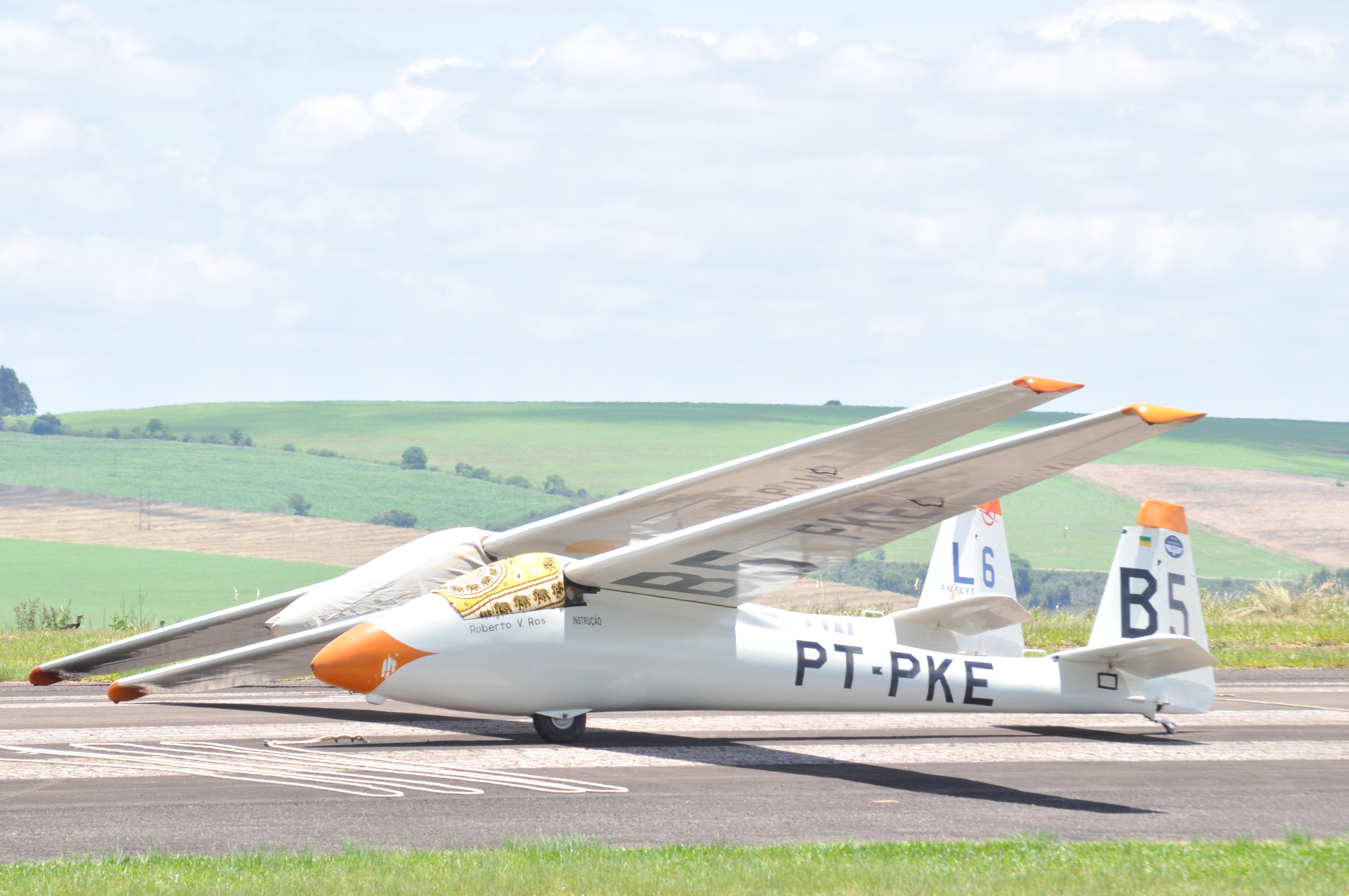

General information
- Type: Sailplane
- National origin: Brazil
- Manufacturer: IPE Aeronaves
- Designer: Kuno Widmaier
- Number built: 156

History
- First flight: 18 December 1969

The KW-1b Quero Quero (Brazilian name for the southern lapwing bird) is a sailplane that was produced in Brazil in the 1970s and 1980s. It is a conventional, single seat design of wooden construction. The undercarriage is a fixed monowheel, and construction is of wood (freijó and plywood) throughout.

== Development ==
The original KW-1a prototype, designed and constructed by Kuno Widmaier, first flew in 1969. At the time CTA (Brazilian Aviation Authority at the time) was looking for a new sailplane of Brazilian design to re-equip the Aeroclubs. Other types were considered, but the good results achieved by Widmaier called attention of the selection group.

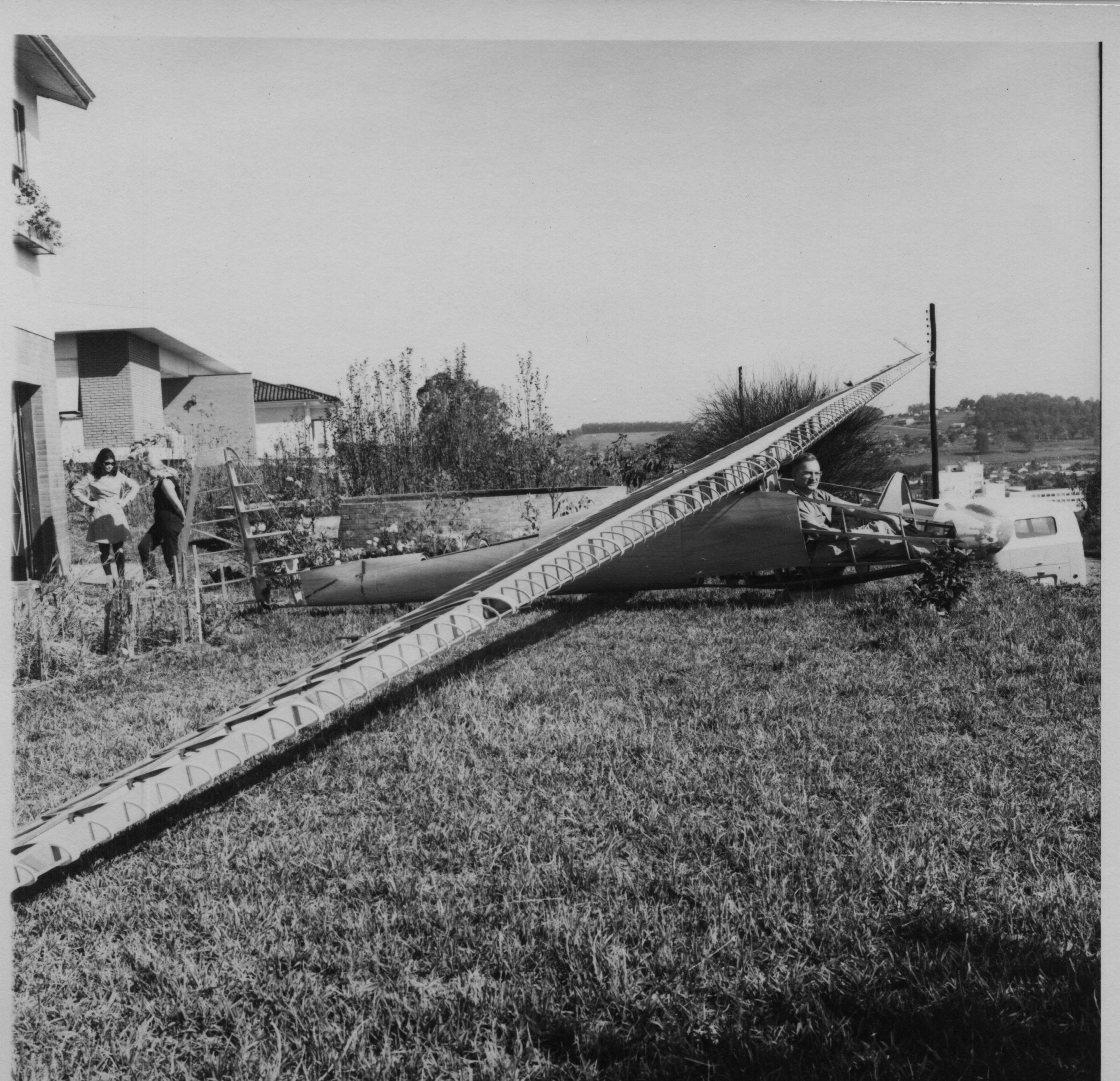
KW1 during its construction in Novo Hamburgo, Brazil

IPE started the process of adaptations required for certification and assembly production: taller cockpit, redesigned nose, and enlarged rudder, it achieved Brazilian certification in December 1976 and was produced by IPE (Indústria Paranaense de Estruturas) under contract by the Brazilian Government. 156 units were produced and supplied to Brazilian flying clubs. Many soaring records were established with the type (Kw-1 Records), which is commonly used as the first solo type during flight training. As of 2017 it was still the most numerous glider type in Brazil.

== Variants ==
After certification, about four different variants were developed: two variants by IPE, and two from independent initiatives.

=== Quero Quero II ===
Developed by IPE with different vertical and horizontal tail, and retractable wheel. At least one built.

=== Quero Quero GB ===
Developed by Eng. Francisco Leme Galvao, and built by IPE, the GB had a different nose, winglets, laminar profile and retractable wheel. Two Built with registration PP-ZUM and PP-ZUN.

=== Falcon ===
In 1978, Wolfram Gabler and his father Ebehard Gabler, developed from a Kw-1 fuselage a modified version with a different wing profile, new wing-tips, and cockpit. The construction of the new version took place at his father's living room, taking 5600 working hours.

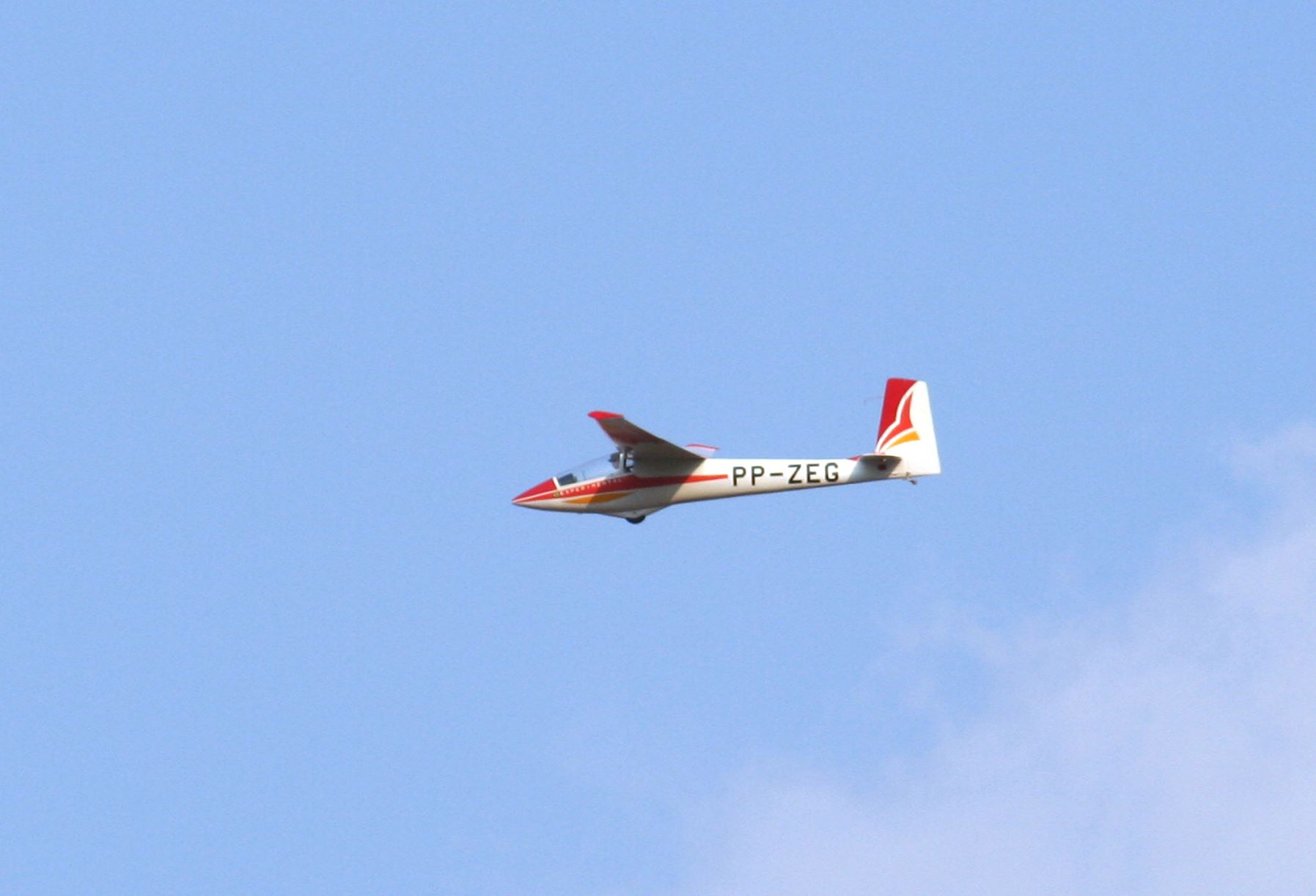
PP-ZEG only Falcon built flying circa 2011

The maiden flight took place on October 15, 1982, flow by Wolfram Gabler at Palmeira das Missoes, Brazil. The variant was very successful in soaring contests, having won 3 championships. Only a single unit was built.

=== Super Quero Quero ===
Developed independently, with a new cockpit, wing plan-form, vertical tail, and fixed mono wheel. At least two built.

=== Z-16 ===
Military variant of the KW-1b2 Quero Quero for the Brazilian Air Force.

== Specifications ==
General characteristics

- Crew: One pilot
- Length: 6.47 m (21 ft 3 in)
- Wingspan: 15.00 m (49 ft 3 in)
- Height: 1.34 m (4 ft 5 in)
- Wing area: 11.7 m^{2} (126 sq ft)
- Aspect ratio: 18
- Empty weight: 170 kg (370 lb)
- Gross weight: 270 kg (600 lb)

Performance

- Maximum speed: 159 km/h (90 mph, 78 kn)
- Maximum glide ratio: 28
- Rate of sink: 0.61 m/s (130 ft/min)

== See also ==
- Kuno Widmaier
- IPE Aeronaves

Aircraft of comparable role, configuration, and era

- Schleicher Ka 6
