= CEA-101 CB.1 Gaivota =

CB.1 Gaivota
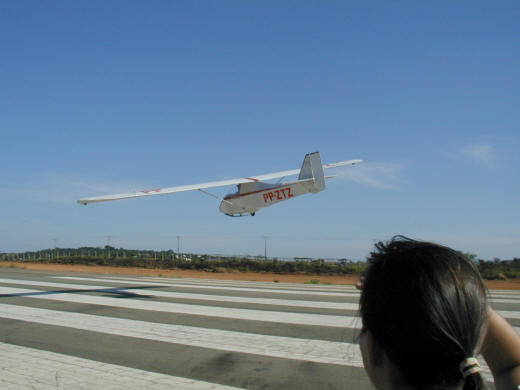
- CB.1 Gaivota on approach in 2004 at Brigadeiro Cabral Airport

General information
- Type: Sailplane
- National origin: Brazil
- Manufacturer: CEA-EEUFMG
- Designer: Cláudio de Barros
- Number built: 1

History
- Introduction date: 1965
- First flight: 1963

The CEA-101 CB.1 Gaivota (Brazilian name for the seagull bird), is a single-seat sailplane of high-wing construction designed in 1963 in Brazil.

It was designed by the Portuguese engineer and professor Cláudio de Barros. The CEA-101 was of great importance for the further development of aviation in Minas Gerais. The Minas Gerais Gliding Club used the aircraft as a training aircraft until the early 1980s. After that, the CB.1 was lost in a hangar for a while. In 2001, with the help of former students of DEMEC and aviation friends of CEA, it was restored and since 2003 it is again airworthy with the registration PP-ZTZ.

== Specifications ==
Data from Pereira 1997, p. 73

General characteristics

- Crew: 1
- Length: 5.52 m (18 ft 1 in)
- Wingspan: 15 m (49 ft 3 in)
- Upper wingspan: 10.2 m (33 ft 6 in)
- Wing area: 10.22 m^{2} (110.0 sq ft)
- Empty weight: 190 kg (419 lb)
- Max takeoff weight: 280 kg (617 lb)

Performance

- Stall speed: 65 km/h (40 mph, 35 kn)
- Never exceed speed: 260 km/h (160 mph, 140 kn)
- Maximum glide ratio: 1.38 at 90 km/h (56 mph)
- Rate of sink: 0.89 m/s (175 ft/min)
- Wing loading: 17.8 kg/m^{2} (3.6 lb/sq ft)
