= Neiva B Monitor =

Brazilian glider plane

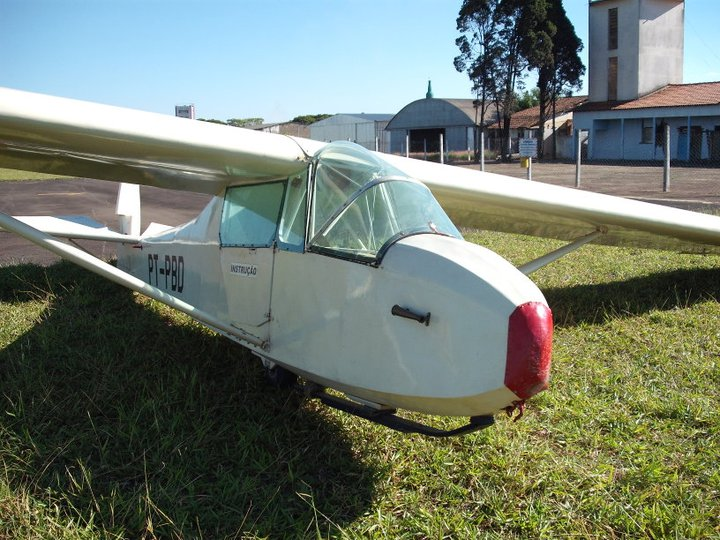

General information
- Type: two-seater training sailplane
- National origin: Brazil
- Manufacturer: Indústria Aeronáutica Neiva
- Designer: Jose Carlos de Barros Neiva
- Number built: 21

History
- Introduction date: 1950
- First flight: 1945
- Developed from: Grunau Baby

The Neiva B Monitor, also designated B-2, is a Brazilian tandem two-seat glider aircraft designed and manufactured by Indústria Aeronáutica Neiva between 1945 and 1955 for primary training and general flying.

== Design and development ==
The B Monitor was designed by Jose Carlos de Barros Neiva after the end of World War II. At that time Brazil was conducting the "Campanha Nacional de Aviação" (National Aviation Campaign), a nationwide program focused on re-equipping and incentivizing Aero clubs and the aeronautical industry. The lack of good performance gliders with good training qualities to replace the ageing and obsolete sailplane training fleet, composed in its majority by German types of the 1930s, was acute. Jose Carlos de Barros Neiva designed then a glider which conserved the best characteristics of the Grunau Baby, widely used in Brazil at the time. The first prototype, registered PP-PCB had its maiden flight in 1945, and the type certificate was given in 1950. The “Campanha Nacional de Aviação” bought the first prototype and other 20 aircraft for the aero clubs. A modified version called B-Monitor Modificado was built with a different nose and different materials in the mid-1950s.

=== Construction ===
The Monitor is largely a wooden aircraft. Its high wings are built around a single box spar, with a torsion resisting, plywood covered leading edge. Behind the spar the wing is fabric covered. Dihedral is just 0.5°. The wings are braced to the lower fuselage with a pair of single lift struts. The ailerons are wood framed and fabric covered; spoilers are wooden.

The fuselage is mainly built with wood, a semi-monocoque construction with steel tubes for wing attachments. The two seat cockpit has dual controls. The empennage is conventional, with a braced tailplane mounted on top of the fuselage. The landing gear is a forward skid with elastic dampers and a single, fixed wheel aft of the centre of gravity.

== Variants ==
=== Neiva B Modificado ===
In 1959, Neiva produced a version called B-Monitor Modificado with different nose, and cockpit. The fuselage was built with welded steel tubes, but conserving the same wing and tailplane. A single unit was produced (Serial number CTA-02 A-223), for evaluation at the Department of Aerospace Science and Technology of the Brazilian Air Force, and was later donated to CVV-CTA Aeroclub.

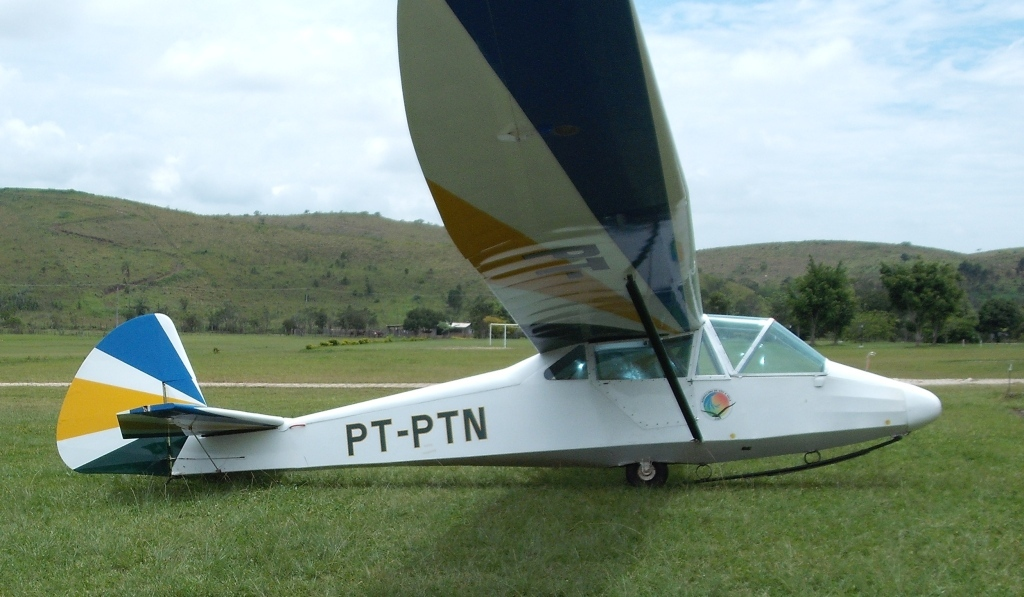
The only surviving Neiva-B modificado at CVV-CTA in 2009

== Operational history ==
The B-Monitor were used in many aero clubs and have trained hundreds of pilots. Many Brazilian soaring records were established in the type and it was used as a primary trainer in some of the largest Brazilian aero clubs, including CVV-CTA in São José dos Campos/Ipuã, Rio Claro, Osório, and Tatuí.

== Specifications ==
Data from Jane's All the World's Aircraft 1956/7 The World's Sailplanes:Die Segelflugzeuge der Welt:Les Planeurs du Monde

General characteristics

- Crew: 2
- Length: 7.1 m (23 ft 4 in)
- Wingspan: 15.86 m (52 ft 0 in)
- Height: 1.13 m (3 ft 8 in)
- Wing area: 18.4 m^{2} (198 sq ft)
- Aspect ratio: 13.67
- Airfoil: Göttingen 535 - NACA 0009
- Empty weight: 215 kg (474 lb)
- Max takeoff weight: 375 kg (827 lb)

Performance

- Stall speed: 52 km/h (32 mph, 28 kn)
- Never exceed speed: 145 km/h (90 mph, 78 kn)
- g limits: +5.33 -3.31 at 145 km/h (90.1 mph; 78.3 kn)
- Maximum glide ratio: 18 at 67 km/h (41.6 mph; 36.2 kn)
- Rate of sink: 0.78 m/s (154 ft/min) at 55 km/h (34.2 mph; 29.7 kn)
- Wing loading: 20.3 kg/m^{2} (4.2 lb/sq ft)
