= CAP Saracura =

General information
- Type: Glider
- National origin: Brazil
- Manufacturer: Laminação Nacional de Metais
- Number built: 40

History
- First flight: 1942

The CAP Saracura (Brazilian-Portuguese name for the Slaty-breasted wood rail), also designated IPT-3 Saracura, was a Brazilian monoplace glider aircraft designed and manufactured by Companhia Aeronáutica Paulista during 1942 for primary training and general flying.

== Background ==
In the early 1940s, sailflying was gaining a lot of enthusiasts in Brazil, but gliders were lacking. With the escalation of the conflicts in Europe, it became more difficult to acquire equipment, mostly German, which had arrived in Brazil in significant numbers previously. Anticipating a business opportunity, Francisco Pignatari decided to ask the Technological Research Institute technicians for help in the studies and designs of a new glider.

== Design and development ==
It was designed by IPT's engineering team, under the responsibility of the chief engineer, Romeu Corsini. Was designed conserving the best characteristics of the Grunau Baby, widely used in Brazil at the time. The Saracura could be towed either by car or by airplane. The Saracura could be towed either by car or by airplane.

It had an all-wood, high winged, notched structure.

== See also ==
- Göppingen Gö 1
- I.Ae. 34 Clen Antú
- I.Ae. 41 Urubú

Aircraft of comparable role, configuration, and era

- Stamer Lippisch Zögling
- Schneider Grunau Baby
