= Juvenelle Rosario Skua =

Brazilian ultralight aircraft

Skua

General information
- Type: Motor glider
- National origin: Brazil
- Manufacturer: Juvenelle Rosario
- Status: Production completed
- Number built: at least three

The Juvenelle Rosario Skua is a Brazilian mid-wing, T-tailed, single-seat motor glider that was designed and produced by Juvenelle Rosario of Florianópolis. When it was available it was supplied as a complete aircraft.

== Design and development ==
Named for the seabird of the same name, the aircraft is built predominantly from carbon fibre and intended to qualify as a European microlight.

The aircraft is a conventional self-launching sailplane, with a retractable engine. The 12.6 m (41.3 ft) span wing mounts dive brakes and holds water ballast. The wings can be folded for storage or ground transportation. The aircraft reportedly has a very low empty weight of 70 kg (154 lb).

In 2003 production was reported at one per month. At that time two customer aircraft had been completed and three were on order at a price of US$15,000 each.

== Specifications (Skua) ==
Data from World Directory of Leisure Aviation 2003-04

General characteristics

- Crew: one
- Wingspan: 12.6 m (41 ft 4 in)
- Wing area: 12.2 m^{2} (131 sq ft)
- Empty weight: 70 kg (154 lb)

Performance

- Stall speed: 32 km/h (20 mph, 17 kn)
- Never exceed speed: 130 km/h (81 mph, 70 kn)
- Maximum glide ratio: 27:1
- Rate of sink: 0.7 m/s (140 ft/min)

== See also ==
- List of gliders
