= List of Polish gliders =

This is a list of gliders/sailplanes of the world, (this reference lists all gliders with references, where available) Note: Any aircraft can glide for a short time, but gliders are designed to glide for longer.

== Polish miscellaneous constructors ==
- AMA Motoszybowiec
- Antykacap
- Babiński 1912 glider
- Babiński 1913 glider
- Barszczowski Glider
- Bartel 1 Glider
- Bartel 2 Glider
- Bielany School Glider
- Bilski Mewa (Gull) No.14 – Second Polish Glider Contest 17 May – 15 June 1925
- Bistrama & Puławski SL-3 No.8 – Second Polish Glider Contest 17 May – 15 June 1925
- Blaicher B-38
- Błażyński Polon – First Polish Glider Contest August 1923 – Alojzy Błażyński
- Blogoslawienstwo
- Bohatyrewa Miś (Teddy Bear) No.12 – Second Polish Glider Contest 17 May – 15 June 1925
- Bohatyrewa Motyl
- Bums glider
- Bydgoszczy Żabuś
- Chelm School Glider
- Chrzanowski School Glider
- Chrzanowskiego 1912 glider
- Chyliński HWL Pegaz – Tadeusz Chyliński
- Cywiński Lublin – First Polish Glider Contest August 1923 – Stanisław Cywiński
- Czarnecki & Wroński Ikar
- Czechovski Śpiesz się powoli (hasten slowly) No.11 – Second Polish Glider Contest 17 May – 15 June 1925
- D.1 'Cykacz' (Ticker) – Centralne Warsztaty Lotnicze – Central Aviation workshops
- de Beaurein & John Glider
- Diana-2 – Diana Sailplanes
- Drzewiecki SL-2 Czarny Kot No.6 – Centralne Warsztaty Lotnicze – Second Polish Glider Contest 17 May – 15 June 1925
- Dubno School Glider
- Działowski Bydgoszczanka No.2 – Second Polish Glider Contest 17 May – 15 June 1925 – Dzalialowski, Stanislaw & Dzalialowski, Mieczyslaw
- Elżanowski ZE-1 Cytrynka
- Garstecki Rywal (Rival) No.17 – Second Polish Glider Contest 17 May – 15 June 1925 – Garstecki, Tadeusz
- Grodziska Mazowieckiego
- Grzmilas Orkan I (Whirlwind I) No.10 – Second Polish Glider Contest 17 May – 15 June 1925 – Grzmilas, Tadeusz
- HWL Pegaz
- Ikub 1a – KUBICH, Jan
- ITS-IVB - Nowotny
- Jach Bimbuś (Bimbo) No.3 – Second Polish Glider Contest 17 May – 15 June 1925
- Jach Żabuś (Froggy) – First Polish Glider Contest August 1923
- Janika
- Janowsky J-5 Marco – Janowski, Jaroslaw
- Janowsky J-6 Fregata – Janowski, Jaroslaw
- Jasiński & Czarnecki Czajka (Lapwing) No.15 – Second Polish Glider Contest 17 May – 15 June 1925
- Jaworski WJ 3 – Jaworski, Wiktor
- K.L.S.2 – 'Start' Aviation Circle
- K.L.S.3 – 'Start' Aviation Circle
- Karpiński 1929 glider – Karpinski, Adam
- Karpiński SL-1 Akar
- Karski 1910 Glider – Karski, Julian
- Karski 1912 Glider – Karski, Julian
- Krząkała Glider
- Kubicki Ikub I – First Polish Glider Contest August 1923
- Kućfir Pirat (Pirate) – First Polish Glider Contest August 1923
- L.O.P.P. Poznan Ikar (Icarus) (L.O.P.P. – Liga Obrony Powietrznej i Przeciwgazowej – League of Air and Anti-gas Defence)
- Lotnia Feyrala
- Luków School Glider
- Malinowski Dziaba – First Polish Glider Contest August 1923 – Malinowski, Stefan
- Marianów W-1
- Marianów WW-1
- Mechanik (glider) – J. Warczewski – (Mechanic) No.16 – Second Polish Glider Contest 17 May – 15 June 1925
- MIP Smyk
- Młody Lotnik Glider
- Motyl (glider) (Butterfly) No.20 – Second Polish Glider Contest 17 May – 15 June 1925
- Mroczkowski 1910 Glider
- Muraszew-Tomaszewski MT1
- Muszyński ZM-1 – Muszynski, Zbigniew
- Muszyński ZM-3 – Muszynski, Zbigniew
- Naleszkiewicz-Nowotny NN 1 – Nowotny, Adam & Naleszkiewicz, Jaroslaw
- Naleszkiewicz-Nowotny NN 2 – Nowotny, Adam & Naleszkiewicz, Jaroslaw
- Naleszkiewicz JN 1
- Okarmusa 1
- Okarmusa 2
- Peregrine Sailplanes KR-03 (Puchatek)
- Piotrków School glider
- Ploszajski KLS-II
- PZL 22
- Roman Szynkiewicz's Glider
- Saloni 1910 Glider – SALONI, Bronisław
- Segno 1909 glider – SEGNO, von Henryk
- Sergiusz Czerwiński's Glider
- Stanięda 1 – Emanuel Stanięda
- Stanięda 2 – Emanuel Stanięda
- Stanięda 3 – Emanuel Stanięda
- Stoerl 1911 glider
- SZD-51 Junior
- Tański Lotnia (Tańskiego) I
- Tański Lotnia (Tańskiego) II
- Tański Lotnia (Tańskiego) III
- Tarczyński and Stępniewski TS-1/34 Promyk – Tarczynski, Tadeusz & Stepniewski, Wiesław
- Tułacz M.1 – First Polish Glider Contest August 1923 – Tulacz, Piotr
- Twist Master
- Uczniów Gymnazjum – Chrzanowski-Gymnasiums in Warszawa
- Uczniów Lwowskich 1910 Glider – Baszniak, Kazimierz & Siemiuła, Wlodzimierz & Sokalski, Aleksander
- Uczniów z Piotrkowa
- Uszacki KLS-I Młodego Lotnika – Uszacni, Antoni
- Wallisa S-I No.18 – Second Polish Glider Contest 17 May – 15 June 1925 – WALIS, Józef
- Wallisa S-III No.19 – Second Polish Glider Contest 17 May – 15 June 1925 – WALIS, Józef
- Wladyslaw W.1 – Wladyslaw Gallar – Marianów OO Warsaw High School
- Warsztaty Lotnicze Czajka - Kocjan
- Yalo Moto-Bocian – Yalo S.C. of Nowy Dwor Mazowiecki
- ZA Szybowiec – (ZA glider) – Związek Awiatyczny – Związek Awiatyczny (Club de l'Université Technique de Lwow)
- Zalewski W.Z.II – Zalewski, Wladyslaw & Zalewski, Boleslaw
- Zalewski W.Z.VIII'DePeŻe' – Centralne Warsztaty Lotnicze – Central Aviation workshops
- Zalewski W.Z.X – Centralne Warsztaty Lotnicze – Central Aviation workshops
- ZASPL 1913 glider -, Władysław & Tadeusz Florjańsky – Związek Awiatyczny Studentów Politechniki Lwowskiej (Club de l'Université Technique de Lwow)
- ZASPL Osa
- Zbaraż School Glider
- ZE-1 (Cytrynka – lemon) – 'Start' Aviation Circle
- Zygmund-Pawliczak ZP – Ludwik Zygmund & Antoni Pawliczak
