= List of gliders (N) =

This is a list of gliders/sailplanes of the world, (this reference lists all gliders with references, where available) Note: Any aircraft can glide for a short time, but gliders are designed to glide for longer.

== N ==
=== N.V. Vliegtuigbouw ===
- N.V. Vliegtuigbouw V-20
- N.V. Vliegtuigbouw 013 Sagitta
- N.V. Vliegtuigbouw Deventer

=== Naleszkiewicz-Nowotny ===
(Franciszek Kotowski & Adam Nowotny)

- Naleszkiewicz-Nowotny NN 1
- Naleszkiewicz-Nowotny NN 2
- Naleszkiewicz-Nowotny NN 2bis
- Naleszkiewicz JN 1
- Nowotny ITS-IV b

=== NASA ===
- NASA Hyper III

=== NAF ===
(Naval Aircraft Factory)

- Naval Aircraft Factory LRN
- Naval Aircraft Factory LR2N

=== Nebeský-Nebeský-Najman ===
(Jaroslav Nebeský & Jan Nebeský & J. Najman)

- Nebeský NSV-3

=== Neiva ===
(Sociedade Constructora Aeronautica Neiva / Indústria Aeronáutica Neiva)

- Neiva BN-1
- Neiva BN-2
- Neiva B Monitor
- Neiva HW-4 Flamingo

=== Nelson ===
- Nelson Hummingbird PG-185B
- Nelson BB-1 Dragonfly

=== Nameche-Wagnon ===
(Nameche & Wagnon / Association Aéronautique du Nord, Roubaix)

- Nameche-Wagnon 1933 glider

=== Nessler ===
(Éric Nessler)

- Nessler N-1 Aérovoilier
- Nessler N-2
- Nessler N-3
- Nessler N-4

=== Neubauer-Hugel ===
(Neubauer & Hugel)

- Neubauer-Hugel motorglider

=== Neukom ===
(Albert Neukom Segelflugzeugbau / Werner Pfenniger & Albert Markwalder)

- Pfenninger Elfe P1
- Pfenninger Elfe P2
- Pfenninger Elfe PM-1
- Pfenninger-Markwalder Elfe PM-3
- Neukom Elfe M
- Neukom Elfe MN-R
- Neukom Elfe 17
- Neukom S-1 Elfe
- Neukom S-2 Elfe
- Neukom S-3 Standard-Elfe
- Neukom S-4 Elfe 15
- Neukom S-4 Elfe 17
- Neukom AN-66 Super Elfe
- Pfenninger Elfe M

=== New Jersey Soaring Association ===
(New Jersey Soaring Association / Pete Bonotaux & Miller)

- New Jersey S.A. Sesquiplane glider

=== Nida Sklandymo Mokykloje ===
(Nida Sklandymo Mokykloje – Nida Gliding School)

- BK-1
- BK-2

=== Niedrauer ===
(Jerome Niedrauer)

- Niedrauer NG-1

=== Niemi ===
(Leonard A. Niemi / Arlington Aircraft Company)

- Niemi Sisu 1A

=== Nihon Kogata ===
- Nihon Kogata Ku-11

=== Nihon ===
(Nihon University)

- Nihon N-70 Cygnus

=== Nijs & Van Driel ===
(Nijs & Van Driel / J. Akerboom & J. Schmidt)

- Nijs & Van Driel T.10

=== Nikitin ===
(Vasilii Vasilyevich Nikitin)

- Nikitin PSN-1
- Nikitin PSN-2

=== Nipp ===
(Ernst Nipp)

- Nipp Bremen-Lane

=== Nippi ===
(Nihon Hikoki Kabushiki Kaisha – Japan Aeroplane Manufacturing Co. Ltd.)

- Nippi NP-100
- Nippi NP-100A Albatross

=== Nippon ===
- Nihon Kogata Ku-11
- Nihon Kogata Ku-14
- Nihon Kogata MXY5

=== Noble ===
(Bob Noble)

- Noble 1960 glider

=== Nogrady ===
(Claude Bela Nogrady)

- Nogrady Tsarevitch

=== Noin ===
(Claude Noin)

- Noin Choucas
- Noin Sirius
- Noin Exel (built by Alpaéro Gap-Tallard)

=== Nord ===
(Nord Aviation)

- Nord 1300
- Nord 2000

=== Nordman ===
(H. J. Nordman, Flushing, New York)

- Nordman 1923

=== Norfolk Gliding Club ===
(Norfolk Gliding Club, Skeyton)

- Norfolk 1936 glider

=== Northrop ===
(Northrop Corporation / Jack Northrop)

- Northrop 1928 glider – Jack Northrop
- Northrop MX-324 – rocket powered glider
- Northrop MX-334 – rocket powered glider

=== Northwestern ===
(Northwestern Aeronautical Corporation of Minneapolis)

- Northwestern PG-1

=== Novițchi ===
(Vladimir Novițchi - designer / CIL-Rehgin - manufacturer)

- Novițchi RG-1
- Novițchi RG-2 Partizan
- Novițchi G-3 Stahanov
- Novițchi RG-4 Pionier
- Novițchi G-5 Pescăruş
- Novițchi RG-9 Albatros

=== NRC ===
(National Research Council / Geoffrey Hill)

- NRC tailless glider

=== NSDFK ===
(Heinz Kensche / NSDFK Ortsgruppe Berlin / Hochschule für Schauspielkunst Berlin)

- NSDFK Helios a.k.a. HFS Berlin Helios

=== NSFK ===
(Eichhorn / NSFK Ortsgruppe Bielefeld)

- NSFK Möwe a.k.a. Eichhorn Möwe

=== Nyborg ===
(T.G.Nyborg)

- Nyborg T.G.N.1
