= List of gliders (J) =

This is a list of gliders/sailplanes of the world, (this reference lists most gliders with references, where available) Note: Any aircraft can glide for a short time, but gliders are designed to glide for longer.

== J ==
=== Jach ===
(Franciszek Jach)

- Jach Bimbuś (Bimbo) No.3 – Second Polish Glider Contest 17 May – 15 June 1925
- Jach Żabuś (Froggy) – First Polish Glider Contest August 1923
- Jach Żabuś 2 (Froggy 2) No.4 – Second Polish Glider Contest 17 May – 15 June 1925

=== Janka ===
(Zoltán Janka)

- Janka Gyöngyös 33
- Janka Kócsag
- Janka-Rotter Vándor (Zoltán Janka – Lajos Rotter / MOVERO workshop, Gyöngyös)

=== Jansson-Thor ===
(Bengt Jansson & Hank Thor)

- Jansson-Thor BJ-1B Duster
- Jansson-Thor BJ-1 Dyna Mite

=== Japanese Imperial Army Gliders ===
- Ku-5
- Ku-9
- Ku-10
- Ku-12
- Ku-14

=== Janowski ===
(Jaroslaw Janowski)

- Janowsky J-5 Marco –
- Janowsky J-6 Fregata

=== Jasiński-Czarnecki Czajka ===
(Jasiński & Czarnecki)

- Jasiński & Czarnecki Czajka (Lapwing) No.15 – Second Polish Glider Contest 17 May – 15 June 1925

=== Jastreb ===
(Jastreb Fabrika Aviona i Jedrilica – Jastreb Aeroplane and Glider Factory)

- Jastreb Cirrus 17-VTC
- Jastreb Cirrus 75-VTC
- Jastreb Cirrus G/81
- Jastreb Kosava-2-S
- Jastreb Vuk-T (Tomislav Dragović)
- Jastreb Šole 77

=== Jaworski ===
(Wiktor Jaworski)

- Jaworski WJ 3

=== Jefferson ===
(G. Jefferson)

- Jefferson 1933 glider

=== Jelgava ===
- Jelgava I
- Jelgava-Hütter 17

=== Jensen ===
(Volmer S. Jensen, Burbank, CA)

- Martin M-1
- Volmer J-14
- Jensen VJ-11
- Jensen VJ-21
- Volmer VJ-22 Sportsman
- Volmer VJ-23 Swingwing
- Volmer VJ-24W SunFun

=== Jobagy ===
(John Jobagy)

- Jobagy Bagyjo

=== Johnson ===
(Dick Johnson)

- Johnson RHJ-6 Adastra

=== Joly ===
(Édouard Joly)

- Joly Motoplaneur
- Joly CAB 44

=== Jongblood ===
(Mike Jongblood)

- Jongblood Primary

=== Jonker ===
(Jonker Sailplanes / Attie Jonker)

- Jonker JS-1 Revelation
- Jonker JG-1
- Jonker JS-3 Rapture

=== Jubi ===
(Jubi Sportflugzeugbau GmbH)

- Jubi K-13

=== Junkers ===
(Junkers Flugzeug-Werke A.G.)

- Junkers Ju 322 Mammut – Mammoth
