= Cywiński =

Cywiński (feminine Cywińska) is a Polish surname. Notable people include:

- Bernard Cywinski (1940–2011), American architect
- Czesław Cywiński (1926–2010), Polish resistance fighter
- Józef Cywiński (born 1936), Polish-American scientist
- Kevin Cywinski (born 1965), American racing driver
- Piotr Cywiński (born 1972), Polish historian

== See also ==
- Cywiński Lublin - Polish gliders designed by eng. Stanisław Cywiński, produced by Plage i Laśkiewicz
