= Kućfir Pirat =

Pirat
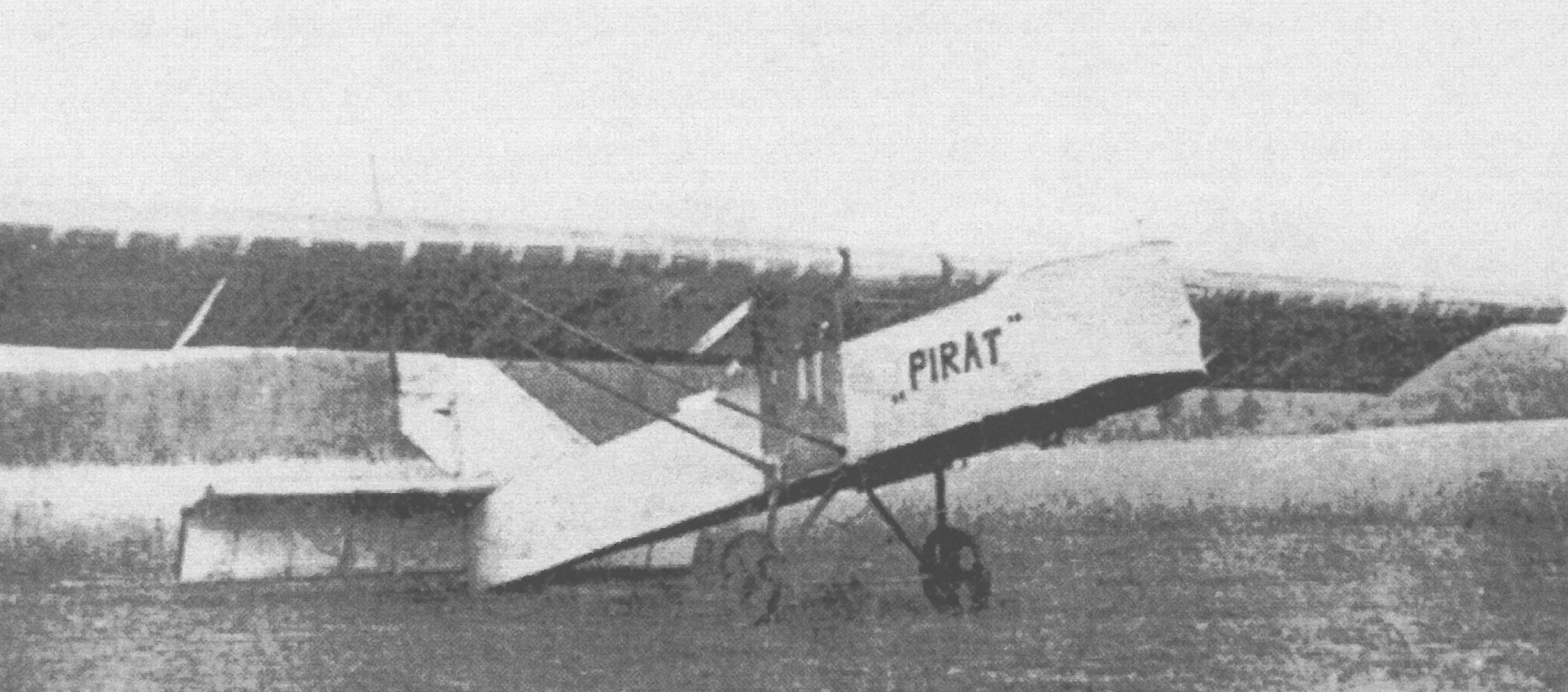

General information
- Type: glider
- Manufacturer: Suchedniów Casting Factory, Kielce
- Designer: Konrad Kućfir

History
- First flight: 6 June 1923

The Kućfir Pirat was a Polish glider designed to compete in the 1923 First Polish Glider Contest. Though it had flown earlier it could manage only one very brief flight at the Contest, ending in a destructive crash.

== Design and development ==
Reports of the first German glider contest, held at the Wasserkuppe in the late summer of 1920, generated considerable interest in Poland, leading to the First Polish Glider Contest at Czarna Góra between 30 August and 13 September 1923. The contest was not a great success, limited by novice designers and pilots and a poor site, but the Karpiński SL.1 Akar was by far the most successful entrant.

The Pirat was a cumbersome and crudely built wooden glider and was the heaviest at the contest. It was designed by Konrad Kućfir, who also supervised its construction at the Suchedniów Casting Factory, Kielce. It had a rectangular plan, two spar, fabric-covered parasol wing. This was wire-braced from above via a pair of kingposts, held over the central fuselage on two slotted steel sheets and braced outboard from the spars to the lower fuselage longerons on each side by a parallel pair of steel-tube struts.

The fabric-covered fuselage had a rectangular section, wooden-framed structure which tapered in plan but not profile to the tail. There was a single-seat, open cockpit. The Pirat's fabric-covered, wire-braced tail surfaces were generous. Its tailplane was mounted on top of the fuselage; both it and the separate elevators were rectangular. The fin was triangular and carried a rhomboidal rudder, the sloping lower edge providing room for the elevators to operate.

Its undercarriage was tall, with the mainwheels on a cross-axle mounted on the lower fuselage longerons by a V-strut at each end.

The Pirat flew before any other contestant, piloted by Kućfir on 6 June 1923 from Mąchocice Górne in the Świętokrzyskie Mountains. The undercarriage was somewhat damaged on landing. The duration of this flight and any others made before the contest are not known but at the contest on 8 September it flew only for 9 seconds before crashing; the Pirat was totally destroyed.

== Specifications ==
Data from Cynk,(1971) except where noted

General characteristics

- Crew: One
- Length: 6.2 m (20 ft 4 in)
- Wingspan: 11 m (36 ft 1 in)
- Height: 2 m (6 ft 7 in)
- Wing area: 16.5 m^{2} (178 sq ft)
- Aspect ratio: 8.3
- Empty weight: 150 kg (331 lb)
- Gross weight: 220 kg (485 lb)
