= Czechowski Śpiesz się powoli =

Śpiesz się powoli

General information
- Type: Single-seat glider
- National origin: Poland
- Designer: Czechowski
- Number built: 1

History
- First flight: May 1925

The Śpiesz się powoli (transl. Hasten slowly), was a Polish glider which gained second place at the Second Polish Glider Contest, held in 1925.

== Design and development ==
Czarna Góra did not provide the wind speeds needed for the First Polish Glider Contest, held in 1923. The organizers of the Second Contest, held in 1925, chose Oksywie near Gdynia in the search for better winds but their hopes were not rewarded and the best flights of 1923 were not approached, though more flights were made and with fewer crashes. The Second Contest began on 17 May and ended on 14 June, though only fifteen of the twenty-seven contestants were flown. The Śpiesz się powoli, designed by Lieut Czechowski, finished second to the Bohatyrew Miś

Built in the Naval Aviation workshops at Puck, the Śpiesz się powoli's design owed much to the Karpiński SL.1 Akar which comfortably won the 1923 contest. Like the Akar its fuselage consisted of two open frames parallel to each other from the wing aft and bearing twin, near-recangular rudders at their ends, where the elevator linked the two frames. Contrasted with the Akar, the frames were simplified with fewer cross-members. A rectangular plan, fabric-covered wing was mounted on top of the frames. The full frame began at the wing leading edge but their converging lower longerons projected forward, supporting the pilot's seat ahead of the wing rather than under the wing as on the Akar, and mounting landing skids in place of the Akar's wheels.

== Operational history ==
Flown by Stempkowski at the contest, the Śpiesz się powoli made the second longest flight (48 seconds), reached the second best height (19 m (62 ft)) and amassed a total flying time of 7 minutes 6 seconds over thirteen flights. The glider was significantly damaged during the competition and it is not known if it flew again.

== Specifications ==
Data from Samolotypolskie

General characteristics

- Crew: One
- Length: 6.5 m (21 ft 4 in)
- Wingspan: 10.7 m (35 ft 1 in)
- Height: 2.0 m (6 ft 7 in)
- Wing area: 19.3 m^{2} (208 sq ft)
