= Miś =

Miś may refer to:

- Miś (film), 1981 Polish film also known as Teddy Bear
- PZL.49 Miś, a Polish bomber design
- Krystian Miś (born 1996), Polish footballer
- Bohatyrew Miś, a Polish glider

== See also ==
- Mis (disambiguation)
