= Tułacz M.1 =

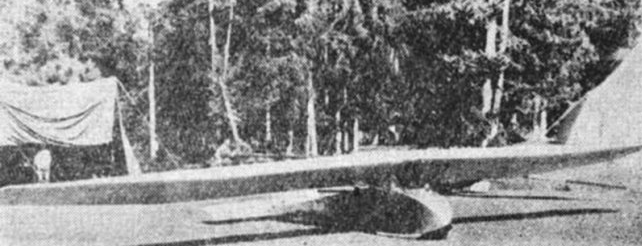

General information
- Type: Single-seat glider
- National origin: Poland
- Designer: Piotr Tułacz
- Number built: 1

History
- First flight: 29 August 1923

The Tułacz M.1 was a Polish glider which competed in the First Polish Glider Contest in 1923. It had some advanced features but its unconventional control system may have caused the landing accident at the end of its first and only flight.

== Design and development ==
Reports of the first German glider contest, held at the Wasserkuppe in the late summer of 1920, generated considerable interest in Poland, leading to the First Polish Glider Contest at Czarna Góra between 30 August and 13 September 1923. The contest was not a great success, limited by novice designers and pilots and a poor site, but the Karpiński SL.1 Akar was by far the most successful entrant.

Another entrant to the Contest, the M.1 was an all-wood monoplane which incorporated several unusual features. It was aerodynamically clean, with a parasol wing and one of only two contestants with a twin-skid undercarriage rather than wheels, decreasing both drag and weight. The wing was in two parts, each half-wing a single spar structure with plywood covering ahead of the spar and fabric covering behind. Their two inner ends were mounted independently to a ply centre-section box by their spars in such a way that the latter could be independently rotated, altering the angles of incidence. The rotation was controlled by push-rods to the wings' inner ends, differential rotation replacing conventional ailerons and rotation together replacing elevators. The centre-section was supported over the fuselage on pairs of short, vertical struts at its front and rear and the wings were braced with short inverted-V struts from the upper fuselage to their spars.

The fuselage was rectangular in section and ply-covered. It was deepest under the wing to accommodate the open cockpit and tapered strongly both forward and aft, with a profile like that of a thick airfoil. The M.1's empennage was a fabric-covered cantilever structure with a conventional fin and rudder but a one-piece, flight-adjustable tailplane.

The M.1 made its first and last flight on 29 August 1923, just before the Contest began. It flew for 17 s but crashed heavily on landing, injuring its pilot Franciszek Wieden. The unfamiliar control system has been blamed for the accident; the M.1 was not repaired.

== Specifications ==
Data from <J. Cynk (1971) except where noted

General characteristics

- Crew: One
- Length: 6 m (19 ft 8 in)
- Wingspan: 11.8 m (38 ft 9 in)
- Height: 1.4 m (4 ft 7 in)
- Wing area: 16.3 m^{2} (175 sq ft)
- Aspect ratio: 8.5
- Empty weight: 98 kg (216 lb)
- Gross weight: 168 kg (370 lb)
