= Cywiński Lublin =

Lublin
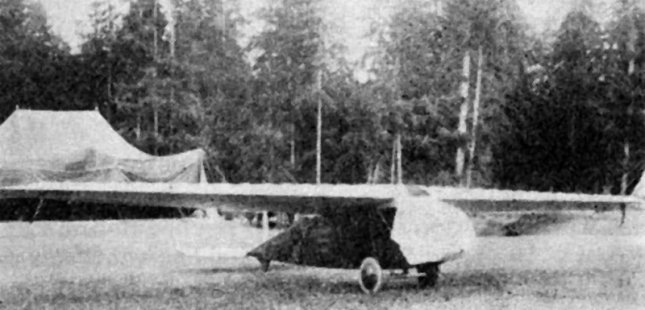

General information
- Type: Single seat glider
- National origin: Poland
- Manufacturer: Plage i Laśkiewicz, Lublin, Poland
- Designer: Stanisław Cywiński
- Number built: 2

History
- First flight: 29 August 1923

The Cywiński Lublin I and II were very similar Polish gliders, designed and built for the 1923 First Polish Glider Contest.

== Design and development ==
Reports of the first German glider contest, held at the Wasserkuppe in the late summer of 1920, generated considerable interest in Poland, leading to the First Polish Glider Contest at Czarna Góra between 30 August and 13 September 1923. The contest was not a great success, limited by novice designers and pilots and a poor site, but the Karpiński SL.1 Akar was by far the most successful entrant.

The Lublin was designed by Stanisław Cywiński and two examples, designated Lublin I and Lublin II, were built in the Lublin works of Plage i Laśkiewicz. The only differences between the two were in their ailerons.

The Lublin was an aerodynamically clean, wooden, high-wing monoplane. Its one-piece wing had two spars, a trapezoidal plan, and a fabric covering. The fuselage had a rectangular section and in profile resembled a thick airfoil. It was covered with dural sheet forward and fabric aft and included an open, single-seat cockpit. At the rear, the rudder and fin together were strongly swept back and roughly rhomboidal in shape. An all-moving tailplane was mounted on the extreme fuselage.

Like most of the gliders at the contest, the Lublin had wheeled landing gear and a tail skid. The main wheels were mounted close to the fuselage underside on a single axle carried, via rubber-cord shock absorbers, by short V-struts.

Each Lublin made only one flight, both piloted by Franciszek Rutkowski and ending in a crash. On 28 August 1923, the Lublin I managed a flight of only 10 seconds and on 6 September the Lublin II lasted 60 seconds. The latter was enough to earn the Plage i Laśkiewicz concern fourth prize, behind the two Akars and the Kubicki Ikub I.

== Specifications ==
Data from J. Cynk, 1971 except where noted

General characteristics

- Crew: One
- Length: 6.5 m (21 ft 4 in)
- Wingspan: 12.5 m (41 ft 0 in)
- Height: 1.4 m (4 ft 7 in)
- Wing area: 17 m^{2} (180 sq ft)
- Aspect ratio: 9.2
- Empty weight: 125 kg (276 lb)
- Gross weight: 200 kg (441 lb)
