= Błażyński Polon =

Polon

General information
- Type: glider
- National origin: Poland
- Designer: Alojzy Błażyński
- Number built: 1

History
- First flight: 28 August 1923

The Błażyński Polon was a competitor in the First Polish Glider Contest, held in the late summer of 1923. It was of advanced aerodynamical design, showed promise but was wrecked before the best winds arrived.

== Design and development ==
Reports of the first German glider contest, flown on the Wasserkuppe in the late summer of 1920, generated considerable interest in Poland leading to the First Polish Glider Contest, held at Czarna Góra between 30 August and 13 September 1923. The contest was not a great success, limited by novice designers and pilots and a poor site. The clear winner was the SL 1 Akar which managed a 186 s flight and the Polon was its only serious competitor, with an early 98 s flight before being written off in a spectator-related accident.

Compared with the Akar the Polon was lighter and aerodynamically cleaner. It also had a high aspect ratio (12.1) wing compared with most 1923 gliders apart from that of the German Darmstadt Konsul (16.7). This wing, essentially rectangular in plan apart from rounded tips and widened ailerons, was built around twin spars and fabric covered. It was shoulder mounted to the upper fuselage longerons, with lift wires between the spars and the lower fuselage longerons.

The Polon had a rectangular section fuselage built around four longerons. The forward part was plywood-covered and the rear fabric-covered, with a wire-braced ply and fabric-covered empennage. The fin was triangular and mounted a generous rhombic rudder, leaving a gap below in which the elevator could work. The tailplane very small, essentially just a mounting for a large area, roughly semi-circular, balanced rudder.

The Polon had a narrow-track undercarriage, its mainwheels close to the fuselage bottom and sides on a cross-axle with shock absorbers mounted within the fuselage.

== Operational history ==
After the repair of some minor damage sustained on the Polon's first, brief flight on 28 August 1923, Błażyński managed three flights in the Contest, under low wind conditions. The last and best lasted 98 s (49 s according to another source). He took off again after an encouraging wind set in but found a spectator in his flight path, tried but failed to avoid him and ended inverted in the broken Polon. Neither he nor the spectator were seriously hurt, though the Polon never flew again.

== Specifications ==
Data from J.Cynk (1971) except where noted.

General characteristics

- Crew: One
- Length: 5.7 m (18 ft 8 in)
- Wingspan: 12.3 m (40 ft 4 in)
- Height: 1.7 m (5 ft 7 in)
- Wing area: 12.5 m^{2} (135 sq ft)
- Aspect ratio: 12.1
- Empty weight: 65 kg (143 lb)
- Gross weight: 125 kg (276 lb)
