= Działowski Bydgoszczanka =

Bydgoszczcanka

General information
- Type: Single-seat glider
- National origin: Poland
- Designer: Stansław and Mieczyław Działowski
- Number built: 1

History
- First flight: on or before 18 May 1925

The Działowski Bydgoszczanka, named after Bydgoszcz, the city where it was built in 1925, was a Polish glider designed to compete in the Second National Gliding Contest.

== Design and development ==
Czarna Góra did not provide the wind speeds needed for the First Polish Glider Contest, held in 1923. The organizers of the Second Contest, held in 1925, chose Oksywie near Gdynia in the search for better winds but their hopes were not rewarded and the best flights of 1923 were not approached, though more flights were made and with fewer crashes. The Second Contest began on 17 May and ended on 14 June, though only fifteen of the twenty-seven contestants were flown. The Bydgoszczanka, designed by the Działowski brothers Stanisław and Mieczyła, won no prizes.

The brothers built the Bydgoszczanka in the workshops of the Pilot's Lower School in Bydgoszcz. It was not the only open frame glider in the contest but its frame and wing position were unusual. The frame was made by gluing together long strips of wood which were then bent back on themselves and fixed in shape with five vertical bracing members and cross-wires. As a result, it was nearly semicircular in profile forward and tapered towards the tail.

More conventional open frame gliders, such as the Wallis S.1, placed the wing on top of the frame but the two spar wing of the Bydgoszczanka was mounted by its spars high on the two most forward vertical cross-members, with wire bracing from the upper and lower frame. The wing was approximately rectangular in plan, with plywood covering ahead of the forward spar and fabric covering behind. The Bydgoszczanka'a broad-chord ailerons, which could be operated together or differentially, merged into full-span, rotating wingtips which acted as aerodynamic balances. The pilot sat exposed under the wing leading edge, his controls including a steering wheel.

The rudder was mounted without a fin on the rearmost frame cross-member, which extended upwards above the upper chord. During the contest it had two different forms. Both were arch-topped but one had its lower edge well above the horizontal tail and the other extended down to the lower chord. A triangular tailplane joined the two rearmost vertical members and mounted an elevator with angled tips; on the short rudder version this had a curved central cut-away but with the long rudder it was divided into two by a V-shaped gap for rudder operation. Cynk and Glass agree that the modification was made during the repair of damage caused by a crash during the contest but not on which form came first.

Modifications were also made to the undercarriage during the contest, again with uncertainty about which form came first. In one arrangement the Bydgoszczanka had wheels on a frame-mounted cross axle without skids, a photograph shows it with both wheels and skids and both sources refer to a version with just skids. Cynk states that the wheeled form came first, followed by the skids-only gear; Glass reverses this order.

== Operational history ==
On the second day of the contest the Bydgoszczanka, piloted by Strzelczyk, made a flight lasting just over 15 sec. It made more flights after its crash and modifications, bringing its total flight time to 72 seconds but then crashed again and was not repaired.

== Specifications ==
Data from J. Cynk, 1971 except where noted

General characteristics

- Crew: One
- Length: 6.5 m (21 ft 4 in)
- Wingspan: 10.25 m (33 ft 8 in)
- Height: 2.6 m (8 ft 6 in)
- Wing area: 15 m^{2} (160 sq ft)
- Aspect ratio: 7
- Empty weight: 78 kg (172 lb)
- Gross weight: 148 kg (326 lb)
