= Czechowski =

Czechowski (feminine: Czechowska; plural: Czechowscy) is a Polish surname. Notable people with the surname include:

- Heinz Czechowski (1935–2009), German poet and dramatist
- Lisa Czechowski (born 1979), American goalball player
- Michał Belina Czechowski (1818–1876), Polish Seventh-day Adventist missionary
- Zenon Czechowski (1946–2016), Polish cyclist

== See also ==
- Czechowski Śpiesz się powoli, Polish glider plane
