= Kubicki Ikub I =

Ikub I

General information
- Type: Single-seat glider
- National origin: Poland
- Designer: Jan Kubicki
- Number built: 1

History
- First flight: July 1923

The Kubicki Ikub I, which some sources refer to as the Ikub Ia, was a Polish glider built to compete in the first Polish glider contest. It was placed third behind two Karpiński SL.1 Akars but gained the second prize and also made what may have been the first nighttime glider flight.

== Design and development ==
Reports of the first German glider contest, held at the Wasserkuppe in the late summer of 1920, generated considerable interest in Poland, leading to the First Polish Glider Contest at Czarna Góra between 30 August and 13 September 1923. The contest was not a great success, limited by novice designers and pilots and a poor site, but the SL.1 Akar was by far the most successful design. The Ikub I, essentially an unpowered but otherwise conventional parasol wing monoplane, gained the second prize.

The Ikub I was an all-wood aircraft. Its one-piece, twin spar wing had a rectangular centre-section and tapered outwards and was covered overall with fabric. It was supported over the fuselage on four near-vertical steel-tube struts and braced with lift wires from the lower fuselage longerons to the spars and with landing wires from a cabane over the fuselage.

Its fuselage was a simple, rectangular section, ply-covered structure with a single-seat, open cockpit under the wing leading edge. The empennage was fabric-covered and wire-braced, with a curved fin carrying a broad, curved rudder. The tailplane was mounted on top of the fuselage, with generous, split elevators. The Ikub had a fixed conventional undercarriage, with its wheels on a single axle mounted on short, steel tube V-struts. A central skid guarded against nose-overs.

== Operational history ==
The first flight of the Ikub was in July 1923, near Warsaw. It was piloted by Wacław Ułass in the Contest and on 19 September he achieved a flight of 74 s. At the very end of the competition (13 September) he made the first night flight by a glider in Poland, possibly anywhere, landing by fires and torches; the flight lasted 100 s.

== Specifications ==
Data from J. Cynk (1971) except where noted.

General characteristics

- Crew: One
- Length: 6.8 m (22 ft 4 in)
- Wingspan: 9.8 m (32 ft 2 in)
- Height: 2.7 m (8 ft 10 in)
- Wing area: 18 m^{2} (190 sq ft)
- Aspect ratio: 5.4
- Empty weight: 104 kg (229 lb)
- Gross weight: 170 kg (375 lb)

Performance

- Cruise speed: 40–50 km/h (25–31 mph, 22–27 kn)
- Rate of sink: 1.3 m/s (260 ft/min) minimum
- Lift-to-drag: 8-9
