= Wallis S.1 =

Polish sailplane

S.1

General information
- Type: Single-seat glider
- National origin: Poland
- Designer: Józef Wallis (or Walis)
- Number built: 1

History
- First flight: 1925

The Wallis S.1, sometimes known as Walis S-1 or Wallisa S-I, was a Polish glider designed to compete in the Second Polish Glider Contest, held in 1925 where it won two prizes.

== Design and development ==
Czarna Góra did not provide the wind speeds needed for the First Polish Glider Contest, held in 1923. The organizers of the Second Contest, held in 1925, chose Oksywie near Gdynia in the search for better winds but their hopes were not rewarded and the best flights of 1923 were not approached, though more flights were made and with fewer crashes. The Second Contest began on 17 May and ended on 14 June, though only fifteen of the twenty-seven contestants were flown. The S.1, designed by Józef Wallis, won the prize for best height gain and third prize for its total flying time.

The S.1 was entered by the 3rd Air Regiment and was built in their workshops at Poznań–Ławica Airport. Its wooden wing, mounted on top of the fuselage frame, was rectangular in plan apart from slightly blunted tips. It was built around twin spars, was fabric covered and braced with V-struts from the spars at about 25% span to the lower fuselage longeron. Narrow chord, half span ailerons extended to the tips.

The fuselage, also wooden, was a simple, uncovered flat wooden frame with a horizontal upper longeron and a lower longeron which angled upwards to the tail. The longerons were cross-braced with several vertical members and further wire bracing. The lower longeron extended forward of the wing leading edge to carry the pilot's open seat, controls and also a landing skid. At the rear the fabric covered tailplane, a cropped rectangle in plan, was on the upper longeron and carried divided elevators cutaway to allow operation of the rudder, which extended down to the lower longeron.

== Operational history ==
The S.1 was flown at the contest by Władysław Szulczewski. He won first prize for a best height gain of 25 m (82 ft) and third prize for a total flying time of 405 seconds, reached in eighteen flights.

== Specifications ==
Data from Samolotypolskie

General characteristics

- Crew: One
- Length: 6.4 m (21 ft 0 in)
- Wingspan: 12.0 m (39 ft 4 in)
- Height: 1.8 m (5 ft 11 in)
- Wing area: 17.6 m^{2} (189 sq ft)
- Aspect ratio: 8.2
- Empty weight: 110 kg (243 lb)
- Gross weight: 170 kg (375 lb)
