= MIP Smyk =

Smyk
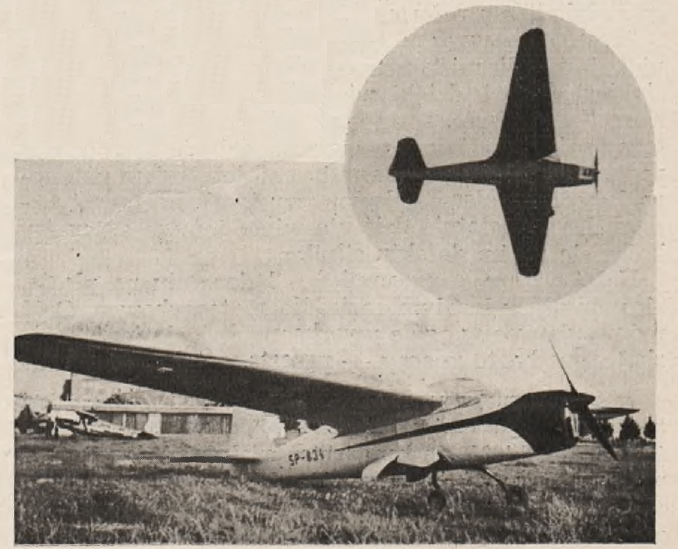

General information
- Type: Motor glider
- National origin: Poland
- Manufacturer: Warsaw Technical University
- Designer: Ludwik Moczarski. Jan Idźkowski and Jerzy Pioszajski
- Number built: One

History
- First flight: 1 October 1937

The MIP Smyk, MIP from the initials of its Polish designers with Smyk meaning Brat or Kid, was an aerodynamically refined motor glider designed and built at the Warsaw Technical University from 1935.

== Design and development ==
The Smyk was designed by three students of the Warsaw Technical University, Ludwig Moczarski, Jan Idźkowski and Jerzy Ploszajski, as a diploma project. Their objective was a low-power motor glider with the lowest possible drag.

The result was a wooden, shoulder wing cantilever monoplane with a retractable undercarriage, powered by a 12–18 kW (16–24 hp) Scott Flying Squirrel AS-2 inverted, air-cooled, twin-cylinder, two-stroke engine. (Note: Lumsden gives the engine name as Flying Squirrel A.2S.) Its one piece, tapered wing, which had an aspect ratio of 7.7, contained a plywood covered torsion box from the main spar around the leading edge. Behind the torsion box the wing was fabric covered. An auxiliary rear spar carried long span, tapered ailerons. The wing's deepened, wholly ply-covered centre-section blended wing roots into the upper fuselage.

The Smyk's cockpit was immediately ahead of the wing main spar within a reinforced cut-out in the torsion box, its rear-hinged transparency closely following the wing profile. The Squirrel engine was conventionally cowled in the nose, with a fuel tank in the centre of the wing behind the main spar. The central part of the fuselage was an oval section, plywood-covered, semi-monocoque structure but the rear fuselage was aluminum-covered for easy inspection of the rear control surface cabling. Its fin was a ply-covered integral part of the fuselage and carried a fabric covered rudder; the tapered, blunt-tipped, cantilever horizontal tail with inset elevators was mounted at mid-fuselage.

The Smyk's unusual retractable undercarriage had two independent short, vertical legs, with compressed rubber shock absorbers and large, low-pressure tyres. Each leg top was rigidly mounted on a V-strut hinged at slight angles to both the longitudinal and vertical axes of the fuselage on a bulkhead-mounted internal frame. When the legs were lifted with a chain system the hinge geometry, combined with a folding stiffening strut, placed the wheels within the fuselage and parallel to its sides. There were two pairs of undercarriage doors, the rear one only open whilst the legs were in motion. The tailskid was a fixed, laminated spring.

The Smyk's first flight was on 1 October 1937, piloted by Aleksander Onoskyo, and testing continued through 1938-9. The Squirrel engine was heavier than specified but nonetheless the aircraft handled well and had a maximum speed of 135 km/h (84 mph; 73 kn). A differential elevator linkage produced precise control input and the usual range of aerobatic manoeuvres, apart from the roll, was available. Some minor modifications were made as a result of these development flights, perhaps the most effective being a high quality repaint, which raised the maximum speed by 20 km/h (12 mph; 11 kn). Since the expensive and heavy retractable undercarriage only increased the maximum speed by 11 km/h (7 mph), it was decided that a second, two-seat Smyk, with a span reduction and powered by a 22–24 kW (30–32 hp) Saroléa Albatros flat-twin engine, should have a fixed undercarriage. Its partially complete airframe was destroyed during the German invasion of Poland in 1939.

== Specifications ==
Data from General J.Cynk,(1974) except where noted.

General characteristics

- Crew: One
- Length: 5.95 m (19 ft 6 in)
- Wingspan: 10.1 m (33 ft 2 in)
- Height: 1.68 m (5 ft 6 in)
- Wing area: 11.5 m^{2} (124 sq ft)
- Aspect ratio: 7.7
- Airfoil: Clarke YH
- Empty weight: 187 kg (412 lb)
- Gross weight: 290 kg (639 lb)
- Powerplant: 1 × Scott Flying Squirrel AS-2 air-cooled, two-cylinder, inverted two-stroke engine, 12–18 kW (16–24 hp)
- Propellers: Two-bladed

Performance

- Maximum speed: 155 km/h (96 mph, 84 kn)
- Cruise speed: 145 km/h (90 mph, 78 kn)
- Range: 450 km (280 mi, 240 nmi)
- Service ceiling: 3,200 m (10,500 ft)
- Rate of climb: 1.9 m/s (380 ft/min)
- Landing speed: 65 km/h (40 mph; 35 kn)
