= Neukom Elfe =

Swiss glider

Elfe
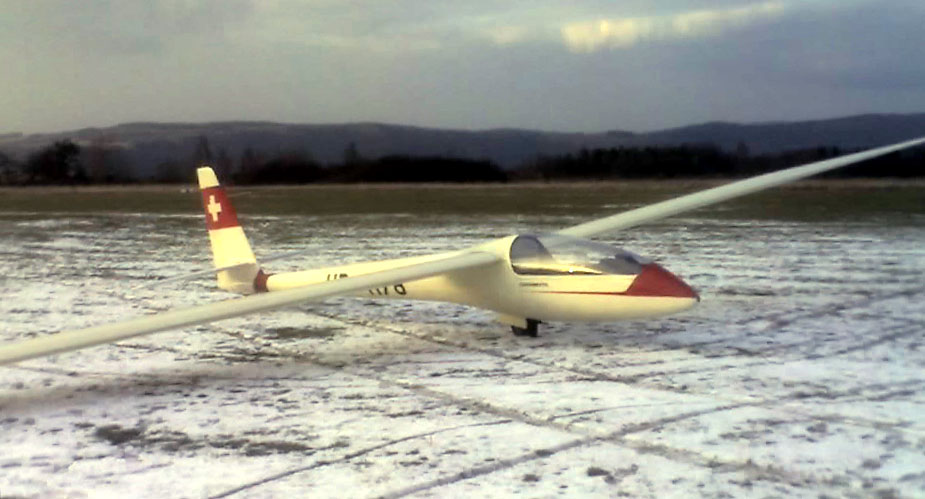
- Neukom S-4 Elfe 17

General information
- Type: Open Class and Standard Class sailplane
- National origin: Switzerland
- Manufacturer: Neukom
- Designer: W. Pfenninger

History
- First flight: 1964

The Neukom Elfe is family of Swiss single-seat high-performance sailplane designs.

The aircraft is a shoulder-wing cantilever monoplane with a wing made from a balsa and plywood sandwich covered in fiberglass and a fuselage built from plywood.

== Design and development ==
=== Elfe and Elfe 2 ===
The first Elfe was a 9-metre wingspan glider that was designed by Swiss designer W. Pfenninger before World War II.

A new design was introduced by Pfenninger in 1947 and was named the Elfe 2. This was probably the first sailplane to feature a laminar flow airfoil. It crashed due to rudder flutter

=== PM-3 ===
The Elfe series was then taken over, improved and strengthened by the Swiss engineer Markwalder into a third prototype, called the Elfe PM-3.

The sole PM-3's construction was started in one factory, but finished in another. It was first flown in 1955 and then went into storage for three years. The aircraft is built from Swiss pine and birch plywood and has a 52.5 foot wingspan. The PM-3 has dive brakes and full-span flaps with aileron interconnects to the flaps. It originally had fixed landing gear, but has been retrofitted with retractable mainwheel.

It was retrieved from storage and flown in Europe by Rene Compte who brought it to compete in the U.S. Nationals at El Mirage, Arizona, held in 1962. After the US Nationals the aircraft was not returned to Europe, but was sold, remained in the US and registered as N6351U in the Experimental – Exhibition/Racing category. In 1999 the PM-3 was sold again and moved to the United Kingdom.

Compte originally reported the glider as being very pleasant to fly, but it did not do well in weak soaring conditions. It performed well only in conditions of strong lift. The PM-3 has a glide ratio of 40:1.

=== Elfe M and S series ===
Albert Neukom then took over the design and developed the Elfe M, Elfe MN and the AN66.

The next in the line was the V-tailed Standard Elfe S-1, which first flew in 1964.

The second prototype, the S-2, was similar to the S-1, but had a conventional tail. The S-3 was the production version of the S-2 and was first flown in 1966 and entered production that same year. It had a cruciform tail, trailing edge airbrakes and a retractable main wheel.

In competition, a Standard Elfe that was flown by Markus Ritzi of Switzerland, placed second in the 1965 World Gliding Championships held at South Cerney, United Kingdom. United States pilot A. J. Smith finished first in the Standard Class at the 1968 World Gliding Championships held at Leszno, Poland in an S-3.

== Variants ==
Pfenninger Elfe
Pre-World War II prototype
Pfenninger Elfe 2
1947 prototype
Markwalder Elfe PM-3
1955 prototype, competed in 1962 US Nationals
Neukom Elfe M
Early 1960s prototype
Neukom Elfe MN-R
Early 1960s prototype
Neukom AN-66 Super-Elfe
Early 1960s prototype
Neukom S-1 Elfe
Sailplane with a V-tail
Neukom S-2 Elfe
Sailplane with a conventional tail
Neukom S-3 Standard-Elfe
Production version of the S-2 with cruciform tail
Neukom S-4 Elfe 15
15 m wingspan
Neukom S-4 Elfe 17
17 m wingspan
IPE Elfe IV
Between 1978 and 1985, Indústria Paranaense de Estruturas built three.

== Specifications (Elfe 15) ==
General characteristics

- Crew: 1
- Length: 7.30 m (23 ft 11 in)
- Wingspan: 15 m (49 ft 2 in)
- Height: 1.80 m (5 ft 11 in)
- Wing area: 11.80 m^{2} (127 sq ft)
- Aspect ratio: 19
- Empty weight: 230 kg (507 lb)
- Gross weight: 350 kg (772 lb)

Performance

- Maximum speed: 210 km/h (131 mph, 114 kn)
- Rate of sink: 0.64 m/s (126 ft/min)

== See also ==
List of gliders
