= Janka-Rotter Vándor =

1930s Hungarian single seat glider

Vándor
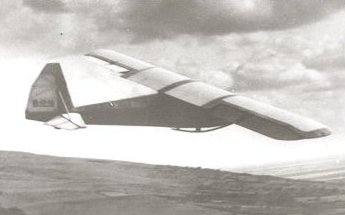

General information
- Type: Intermediate training glider
- National origin: Hungary
- Manufacturer: MOVERO Glider Department Workshop, Gyöngyös
- Designer: Zoltán Janka and Lajos Rotter
- Number built: 1

History
- First flight: Spring 1934

The Vándor (Wanderer) was a 1930s Hungarian single seat glider intended to ready students who had qualified on primary gliders for contemporary soaring and aerobatic aircraft. Only one was built.

== Development ==
In the 1930s most glider pilots began on very simple, single seat aircraft, very often open frame machines like the Zögling, then faced the difficult task of converting to the large soaring and aerobatic gliders of the day. The 1931 Grunau Baby was becoming a popular intermediate trainer, a candidate to fill the gap at least for slope soaring. Though rather little is known about the Vándor, it seems to have been intended to play the same role in the developing but unstructured Hungarian glider scene, capable of soaring and aerobatics. The influence of the 1931 Baby on the Vandor is seen in the similarity of layouts, though the designs are significantly different.

The wooden Vándor was a braced high wing monoplane. Its wings, built around two spars, were rectangular out to semi-elliptical tips. They were plywood covered from the leading edge to the forward spar, with fabric covering the rest of the wing and ailerons, and supported by V-struts from the lower fuselage longerons to the two spars. The ailerons were large, occupying over 60% of the trailing edges.

Its fuselage was polygonal in cross section with deep, flat sides and plywood covered. The pilot sat in an open cockpit immediately ahead of the leading edge of the wing, which was centrally supported on a raised upper fuselage which tapered gently to the tail. The vertical tail had a straight leading edge and tip but the balanced rudder had a trailing edge composed of three straight sections, almost appearing curved. The rudder was mounted on a short fin which was strengthened by wire bracing to the tailplane. In plan the latter was straight tapered and tipped, apart from a generous cut-out in the elevators to permit rudder movement. All the rear surfaces were ply covered. (Note: However, photographs seem to show that the elevator at least was fabric covered.) The Vandor landed on a skid, attached to the fuselage bottom by two rubber ring springs, assisted by a short tailskid.

No precise date for the Vandor's first flight is known but contemporary references suggest it was in the spring of 1934. Its flight characteristics came in for continued criticism. It was heavy, with an empty weight of 173 kg (381 lb) compared with the 125 kg (276 lb) of the Grunau Baby 2, caused partly by the need for extra strength to cope with the stresses of aerobatics. This made slow flight within thermals difficult, not helped by the choice of airfoil. There are no known contemporary reports of its aerobatic performance but the heavy ailerons were much criticised, one student reported that their operation required both hands on the control column. The sole example remained in use until at least 1939 but flying it was seen as a challenge for all but the very best students; it certainly failed to meet its original aim of all-purpose intermediate trainer

== Specifications ==
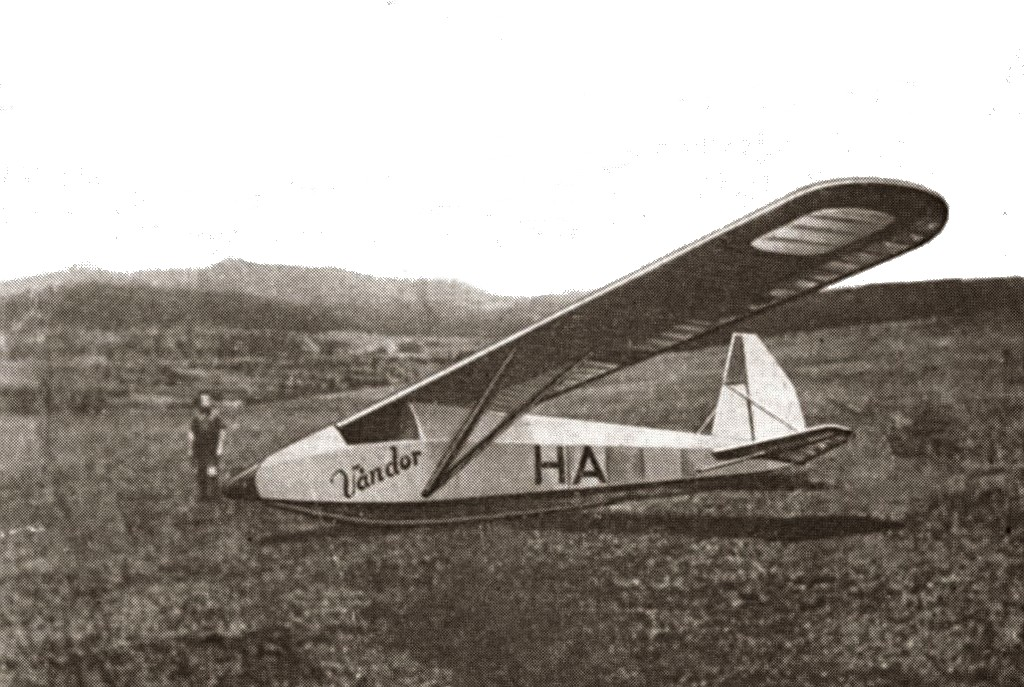

Data from Gabor (1988) p.56

General characteristics

- Crew: one
- Length: 6.28 m (20 ft 7 in)
- Wingspan: 14 m (45 ft 11 in)
- Wing area: 16.2 m^{2} (174 sq ft)
- Aspect ratio: 12.1
- Airfoil: Göttingen 681, maximum thickness/chord 16.8%
- Empty weight: 173 kg (381 lb)
- Gross weight: 253 kg (558 lb)
