= Naleszkiewicz JN-1 =

Polish experimental tailless sailplane

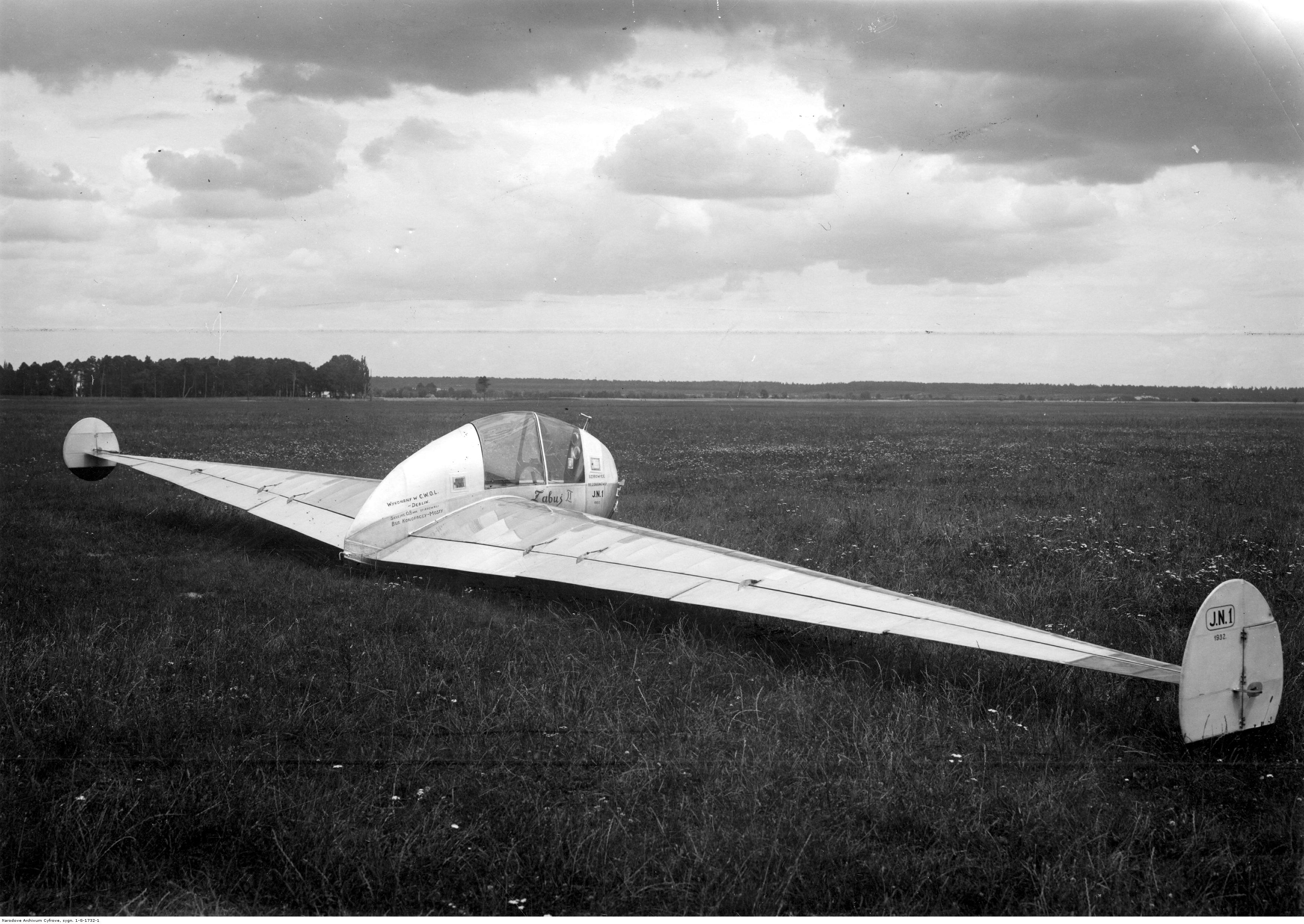

General information
- Type: Experimental tailless sailplane
- National origin: Poland
- Manufacturer: CWOL Dęblin
- Designer: Jarosław Naleszkiewicz
- Number built: 1

History
- First flight: 23 July 1932

The Naleszkiewicz JN-1 was an experimental tailless sailplane designed in Poland to explore the aerodynamic properties of a proposed powered tailless aircraft. It proved hard to fly and a crash led to its abandonment after only a few months of limited testing.

== Design and development ==
Jarosław Naleszkiewicz's Naleszkiewicz JN-1, nicknamed Żabuś II (Froggy II; the Jach Żabuś was an earlier, unrelated Polish glider) was an experimental tailless glider which was intended to test the behaviour of a proposed twin-engined aircraft of the same configuration. It was preceded by a series of rubber-powered models which proved flight stability and suggested good performance.

In essence the wooden JN-1 was a high aspect ratio, cantilever wing with a short, bulbous central nacelle and wingtip vertical surfaces. Its two part wing was trapezoidal in plan, with most of the sweep on the leading edge. Each part was built around a single spar with plywood covering ahead of it, forming a torsion resistant D-box, and fabric covering behind. Control surfaces filled the whole trailing edge, with elevators inboard and ailerons outboard.

The cockpit was within a ply-covered nacelle which reached forward from the trailing edge to well ahead of the leading edge. Its glazing provided good sideways, but limited forward, vision. A pneumatically-sprung skid under the nacelle provided the JN-1's landing gear.

At the wingtips endplate fins carried balanced rudders. Together these vertical surfaces had an elliptical profile, cropped and reinforced below the wing to protect it on the ground. The rudders could be used conventionally in unison or in opposition as airbrakes.

== Operational history ==
The JN-1 first flew on 23 July, rubber rope launched and flown by Franciszek Jach in Dęblin. It proved to be hard to control, being oversensitive in pitch both via elevator control and centre of gravity position. Car-towed flights follows but the control difficulties persisted and in the autumn the JN-1 was damaged in a crash. It was not repaired because of a mixture of funding problems, a lack of official interest and Naleszkiewicz's absence due to a new job in Warsaw.

With its differentially operating rudders it may have the first glider fitted with air-brakes, though of a very different type to the spoilers used a few years later on German sailplanes.

== Specifications ==
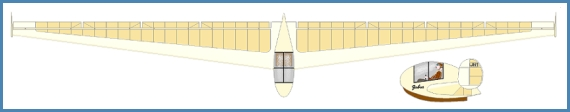
JN-1

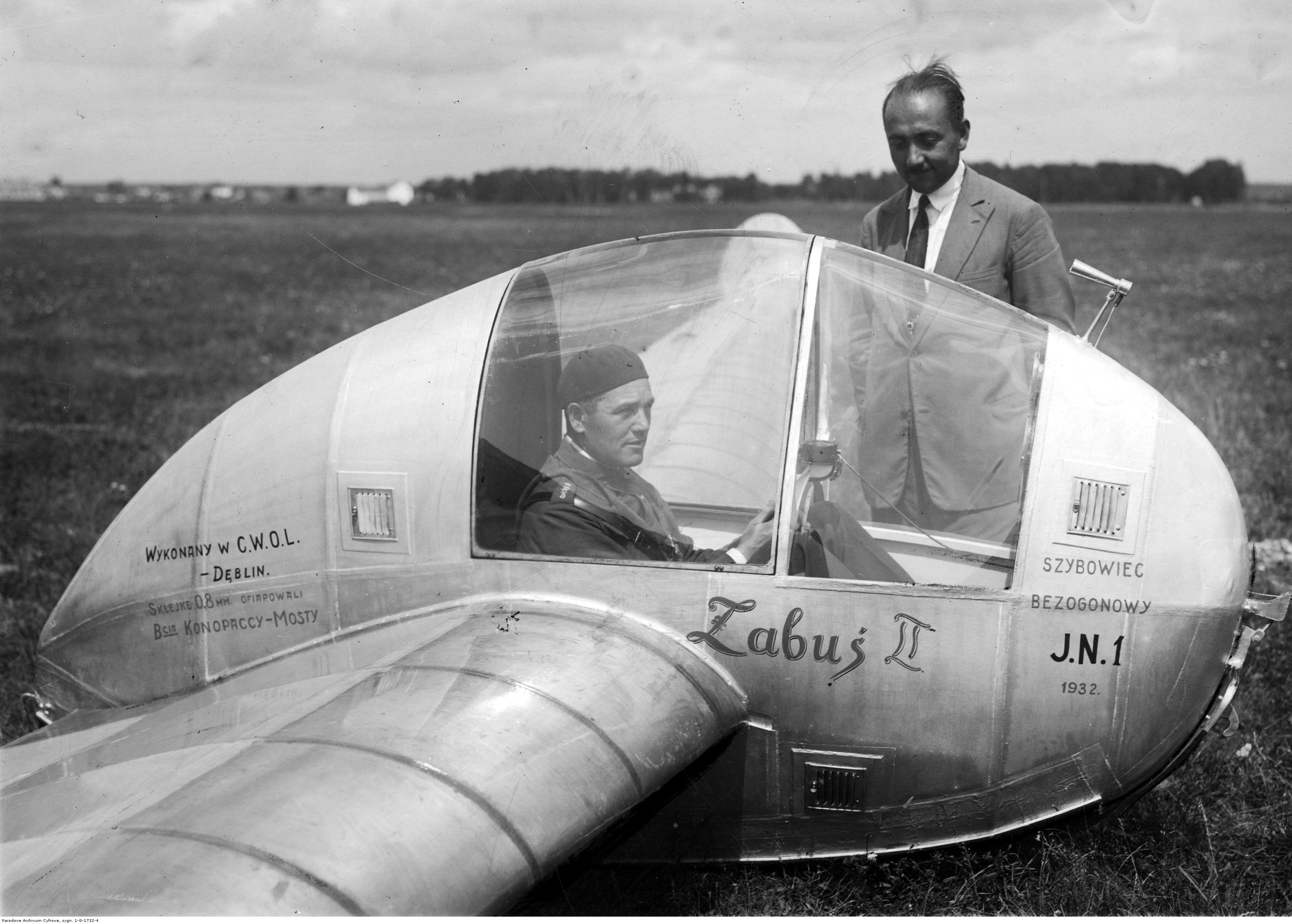
The JN-1 glider, the constructor stands next to the glider

Data from Naleszkiewicz JN-1 Żabuś II, j2mcl-planeurs

General characteristics

- Crew: One
- Length: 3 m (9 ft 10 in)
- Wingspan: 17.9 m (58 ft 9 in)
- Height: 1.37 m (4 ft 6 in)
- Wing area: 16.8 m^{2} (181 sq ft)
- Aspect ratio: 19
- Empty weight: 136 kg (300 lb)
- Gross weight: 211 kg (465 lb)

Performance

- Maximum speed: 130 km/h (81 mph, 70 kn)
- Maximum glide ratio: 16
- Rate of sink: 0.8 m/s (160 ft/min) minimum
