= Blaicher B-38 =

1938 Sailplane

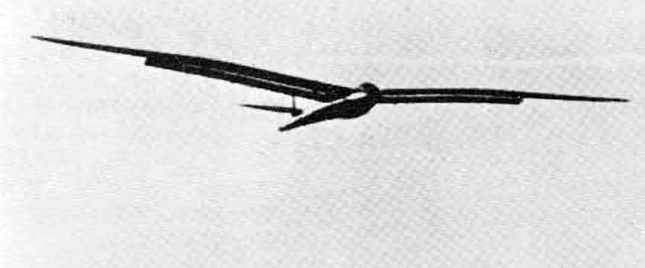
- B-38 in flight

General information
- Type: High performance, single seat, experimental sailplane
- National origin: Poland
- Manufacturer: ZASPL
- Designer: Michal Blaicher
- Number built: 1

History
- First flight: Late 1938 or early 1939

The Blaicher B-38 was a Polish, single seat sailplane completed in 1938. Notable for its use of long span Fowler flaps, its development was ended by the German invasion of Poland in September 1939.

== Design and development ==
Following the WOS-37, his development of the Czerwiński CW 5 bis, Michal Blaicher turned to a new design incorporating Fowler flaps. Construction began in the ZASPL workshops but moved when ZASPL became LWL, controlled by PWS, delaying its completion. Its first flight was made either late in 1938 or in the spring of 1939 at Lwów-Skiłnów, flown by Zbigniew Źabski. After some modifications it was ready for official testing in August 1939 but was destroyed in the German invasion the following month.

The all-wood B-38 had a cantilever gull wing built around two spars and covered with stress-relieving plywood. The mass balanced ailerons were assisted by Flettner tab and, inboard of them, Fowler flaps filled the remaining 2/3 of the span.

The glider's fuselage was a ply-covered, semi-monocoque structure of oval cross-section. Its single seat cockpit, which included blind flying instrumentation, was enclosed and had a long dorsal fairing behind it. At the rear the cantilever tailplane was mounted above the fuselage on the fin; like the ailerons the elevators were tab assisted. Fixed empennage surfaces were ply-covered and the control surfaces fabric-covered.

A detachable, two-wheeled trolley was used for take-off and a sprung skid for landings.

== Specifications ==
Data from J, Cynk (1971), except where noted. Performance from samolotypolskie

General characteristics

- Crew: One
- Length: 6.3 m (20 ft 8 in)
- Wingspan: 16.3 m (53 ft 6 in)
- Height: 1.25 m (4 ft 1 in)
- Wing area: 13.4 m^{2} (144 sq ft)
- Aspect ratio: 20
- Empty weight: 190 kg (419 lb)
- Gross weight: 275 kg (606 lb)

Performance

- Never exceed speed: 200 km/h (120 mph, 110 kn) in dive
- Maximum glide ratio: best 29 at 80 km/h (50 mph; 43 kn)
- Rate of sink: 0.7 m/s (140 ft/min) minimum at 70 km/h (43 mph; 38 kn), flaps up. With flaps down, 0.4 m/s (79 ft/min) at 40 km/h (25 mph; 22 kn).
- Minimum speed:35 km/h (22 mph; 19 kn)

== See also ==
Related lists

- List of gliders
