= Nihon Kogata Ku-11 =

Japanese experimental military glider

Ku-11
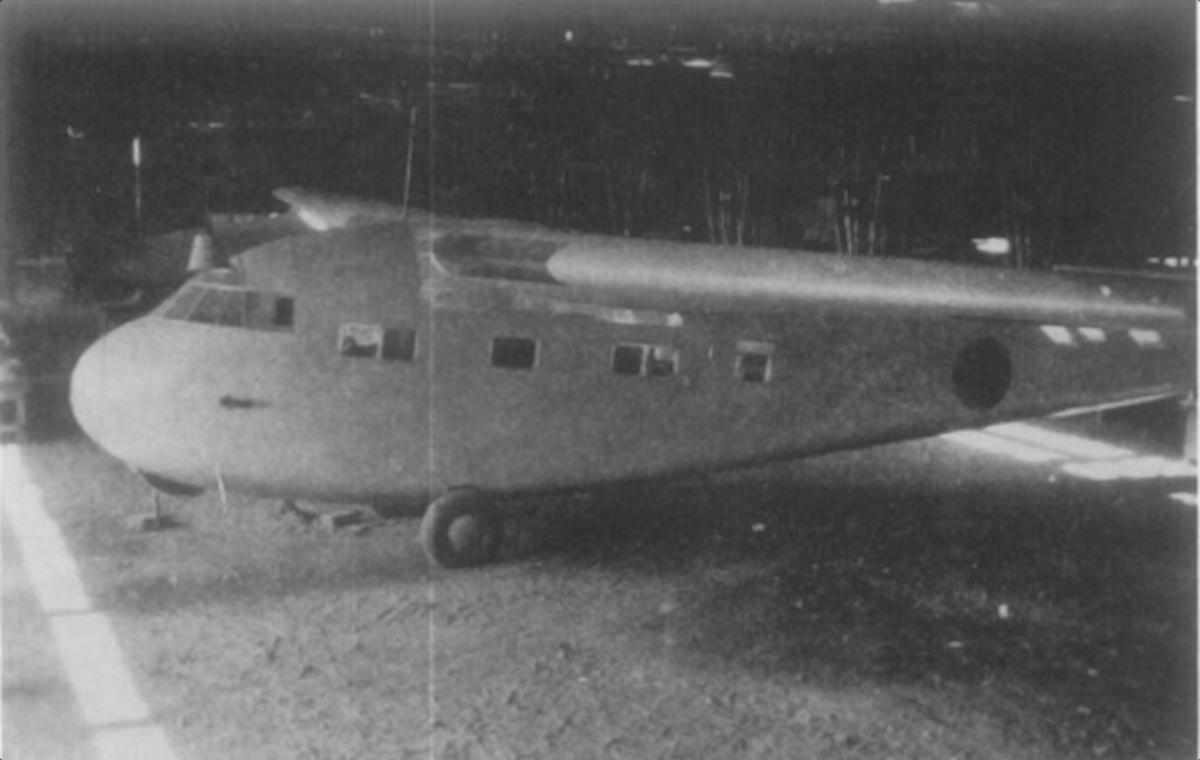

General information
- Type: Transport glider
- National origin: Japan
- Manufacturer: Nihon Kogata
- Number built: 1

The Nihon Kogata Ku-11 (also known as the Nihon Kogata Army Experimental Transport Glider) was a 1940s experimental Japanese military glider. The Ku-11 was an all-wood high-wing transport glider with two crew and room for 12 fully equipped troops. With little interest from the Imperial Japanese Army the type did not enter production.

== Specifications (Ku-11) ==
Data from Fighting gliders of World War II

General characteristics

- Crew: 2 (pilot, co-pilot)
- Capacity: 12 fully equipped troops
- Wingspan: 18.29 m (60 ft 0 in)
- Wing area: 44.1 m^{2} (475 sq ft)
- Empty weight: 1,270 kg (2,800 lb)
- Max takeoff weight: 2,449 kg (5,400 lb)

== See also ==
- List of World War II military gliders
