= Poznań Aviation Circle Motyl =

The Motyl (Polish: "Butterfly") was an early Polish glider constructed by the Poznań Aviation Circle of the Heavy machinery School under the supervision of Michal Bohattrew. The Motyl was entered in the Second Polish Glider Contest, held in 1925, at Oksywie near Gdynia on the Baltic coast, with contest number 20, piloted by Gorzke. The Motyl had a span of 10m (32 ft 9¾in), length of 6.7 m (22 ft), wing area of 17m^{2} (183 ft^{2}) and an aspect ratio of 5.9 with a plywood covered rectangular section fuselage. Little is known of its achievements or detail of the structure.

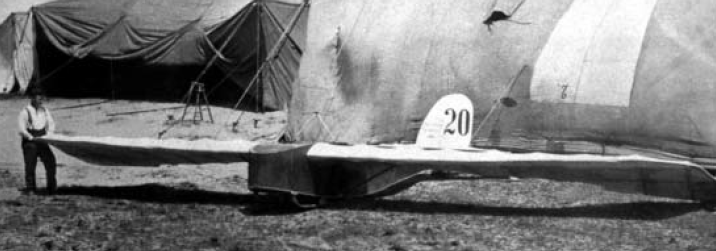
Motyl glider at the second Polish glider contest, with contest number 20
