= Gyöngyös 33 =

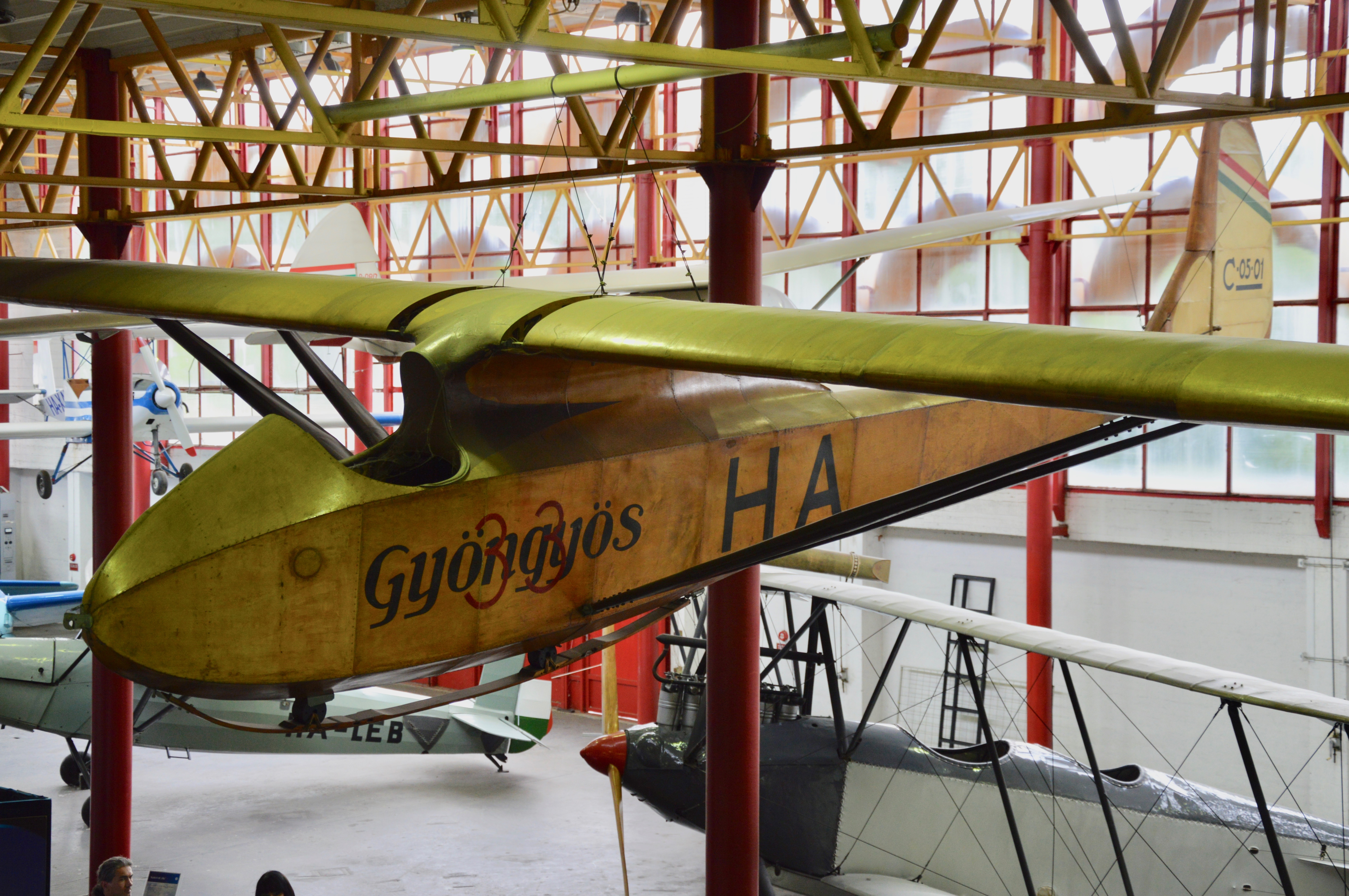
- Gyöngyös 33 on display at the Hungarian Technical and Transportation Museum, Budapest.

General information
- Type: High performance sailplane
- National origin: Hungary
- Manufacturer: MOVERO workshop, Gyöngyös
- Designer: Zoltán Janka
- Number built: 1

History
- First flight: 11 June 1933

The Gyöngyös 33 was the first sailplane designed in Hungary, making its first flight in June 1933. It set several national records, using ridge lift rather than thermal soaring.

== Design and development ==

The Gyöngyös 33 was the first Hungarian designed sailplane and was named after its place and year of manufacture. It was designed by Zoltán Janka and built in the MOVERO (Aviation Section of Hungarian National Defence Association) workshops at Gyöngyös. His design target was to produce an aircraft that would out-perform the 1928 RRG Professor.

It was an all wood monoplane with a two-part wing built around a forward main spar and a rear false spar. The inner area of each part was rectangular in plan, tapering strongly outboard. The leading edges ahead of the main spar were plywood-covered, as was the whole wing at the inner-outer junction; the rest was fabric-covered. An aileron filled the whole trailing edge of each outer section. The two parts joined at a narrow centre-section on a raised fuselage pylon and were braced on each side with a V-strut from the fuselage bottom to the wing spars at the inner-outer junctions.

The Gyöngyös 33's six-sided fuselage was formed by a wooden frame and was plywood-covered. The pilot had an open cockpit ahead of the wing leading edge with the wing pylon immediately behind him. A rubber-sprung landing skid below him ran from the nose almost to the trailing edge. The fuselage tapered rearwards to a cantilever empennage. The fin was small and ply-covered with a tall rudder which, like the all-moving tailplane apart from its leading edge, was fabric covered.

== Operational history ==
The first flight took place on 11 June 1933. A fortnight later the Gyöngyös 33 slope-soared for 5 h 43 m, gaining 1,140 m (3,740 ft) of altitude, a Hungarian record. On 27 June it set a national duration record of 10 h 7 m. In 1934 it made a 64 km (40 mi; 35 nmi) flight.

The Gyöngyös 33 is now on display in the Hungarian Technical and Transportation Museum, Budapest.

== Specifications ==
Data from Hungarian gliders 1933-2000

General characteristics

- Length: 7.37 m (24 ft 2 in)
- Wingspan: 18.55 m (60 ft 10 in)
- Wing area: 19.3 m^{2} (208 sq ft)
- Aspect ratio: 17.8
- Airfoil: Göttingen 549
- Empty weight: 179 kg (395 lb)
- Gross weight: 250 kg (551 lb)

Performance

- Maximum glide ratio: >20 at 55 km/h (34 mph; 30 kn)
- Rate of sink: 0.6 m/s (120 ft/min) minimum
