= ITS-IVB =

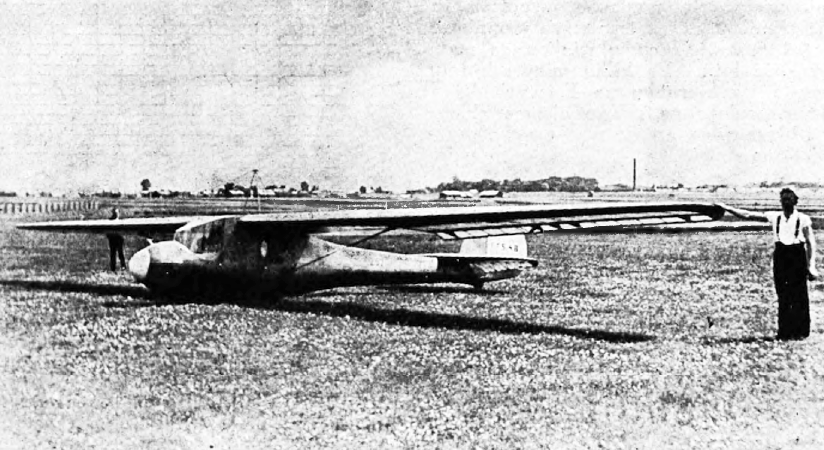

General information
- Type: High performance research glider
- National origin: Poland
- Manufacturer: ZASPL
- Designer: Adam Nowotny, Franciszek Kotowski
- Number built: 1

History
- First flight: 30 July 1935

The ITS-IVB was a 1930s Polish two seat research sailplane designed to gather meteorological and airframe stress data. The sole example remained in service up to outbreak of World War II.

== Design and development ==
The ITS-IV was a high performance, two seat research sailplane designed initially by Adam Nowotny to gather meteorological and airframe stress data. It was also intended to provide blind flying training. Franciszek Kotowski took over the design work after Nowotny's death in July 1934, producing the ITS-IVB.

It was an all-wood aircraft. The two part wing had a rectangular plan central section and gently tapering trapezoidal outer panels with blunted tips. Each part was built around a single plywood D-box spar which formed the leading edge. On each side an internal auxiliary drag strut ran diagonally from the spar at about mid-span to the rear of the wing root and the whole area between spar and strut was ply-covered, forming another box. Elsewhere, the wings were fabric-covered, as were the differential ailerons which filled the trailing edges of the outer panels. The wing bracing was unusual, with the normal rigid struts replaced by upper and lower steel ribbons on each side. Each upper ribbon ran from a central cabane, formed from three steel tubes, to a reinforced region of the spar. The lower ribbons ran from the spars to the lower fuselage. They offered less air resistance and also provided a way to measure wing loads in flight.

The fuselage was a ply-covered semi-monocoque structure with an oval cross-section. It was unusually wide and deep in the central section, tapering away strongly aft of the wings. This variation allowed an uncramped, enclosed pilot's cockpit ahead of the wing and a very generous cabin for the observer, with celluloid-paned underwing windows on each side and accessed via a port side door. The cabin also had a table which could be folded away to allow use of the dual flight controls under blind flying conditions. A sprung landing skid was mounted below.

The empennage was conventional, with a cantilever, tapered tailplane and elevators mounted on top of the fuselage and a fin carrying a full, rounded, deep, rudder hinged behind the elevators. The fixed surfaces were ply-covered and the control surfaces fabric-covered.

== Operational history ==
The ITS-VB's first flight was on 30 July 1935, piloted by its designer and towed by a RWD 8 from Lwów-Skniłów. This revealed aileron flutter and required aileron redesign, after which the glider was stable and handled well. It participated in the Third National Glider Contest held at Ustjanowa Górna in the autumn of 1935 and continued research flying until the start of World War II, based at Bezmiechowa Górna and mostly flown by Piotr Mynarski.

== Specifications (ITS-IVB) ==
Data from J. Cynk (1971) except where noted

General characteristics

- Crew: Two
- Length: 8.42 m (27 ft 7 in)
- Wingspan: 20 m (65 ft 7 in)
- Height: 2.2 m (7 ft 3 in)
- Wing area: 24.3 m^{2} (262 sq ft)
- Aspect ratio: 15.8
- Airfoil: Göttingen Gö 655
- Empty weight: 254 kg (560 lb)
- Gross weight: 431 kg (950 lb)

Performance

- Maximum glide ratio: 22.5 at 73 km/h (45 mph; 39 kn) best
- Rate of sink: 0.82 m/s (161 ft/min) at 63 km/h (39 mph; 34 kn) minimum
- Minimum speed: 48 km/h (30 mph; 26 kn)}
