= Jach Żabuś =

General information
- Type: Single-sear glider
- National origin: Poland
- Designer: Franciszek Jach
- Number built: 1

History
- First flight: Late August-early September 1923

The Jach Żabuś (Jach Froggy) was a Polish glider designed to compete in the 1923 First Polish Glider Contest. It lacked vertical flying surfaces, had an unusual control system and made only one short flight. Rebuilt with conventional tail and controls, it won the distance flown prize at the second contest, held in 1925.

== Design and development ==
Reports of the first German glider contest, held at the Wasserkuppe in the late summer of 1920, generated considerable interest in Poland, leading to the First Polish Glider Contest at Czarna Góra between 30 August and 13 September 1923. The contest was not a great success, limited by novice designers and pilots and a poor site, but the Karpiński SL.1 Akar was by far the most successful entrant.

The Żabuś was designed for the contest by Captain Franciszek Jach and built in the Pilots' Lower School's workshops at Bydgoszcz. The wooden glider had a two-part, rectangular plan, fabric covered parasol wing built around two spars. Its outer parts carried washout and had unusual short but broad chord ailerons which widened to full chord close to the tip. Each aileron was operated independently with its own lever. The wing was held low over the fuselage by a steel tube cabane and braced centrally with outward-leaning splayed N-struts from the fuselage lower longerons to the wing spars on each side.

Its rectangular section, plywood-covered fuselage included an open cockpit under the wing and had an unusual profile, like a cambered airfoil with a strongly arched underside. At the rear there were no vertical surfaces, only a broad chord, triangular tailplane carrying a one-piece, fabric-covered, foot-operated elevator.

Jach piloted the Żabuś on its only flight and crashed after only 19 seconds, probably because of the unconventional control system. It was rebuilt for the 1925 Second Polish Polish Glider Contest, held at Oksywie on the Baltic coast, as the Żabuś 2. After the rebuild the glider had a large, fabric-covered fin and rudder of overall trapezoidal profile, with an appropriately altered control system. As well as making several short flights the Żabuś 2, piloted by Władysław Sulczewski, won the straight line distance prize with a flight covering 560 m (1,840 ft).

== Variants ==
Żabuś
Original, 1923 Contest competitor without vertical tail surfaces and with unusual control system.
Żabuś 2
Rebuilt Żabuś, with conventional fin and rudder and correspondingly modified control system. Awarded first prize for distance covered at the 1925 Contest.

== Specifications ==
Data from J. Cynk, 1971 except where noted.

General characteristics

- Crew: One
- Length: 6.6 m (21 ft 8 in)
- Wingspan: 14.5 m (47 ft 7 in)
- Height: 1.5 m (4 ft 11 in)
- Wing area: 20 m^{2} (220 sq ft)
- Aspect ratio: 10.5
- Empty weight: 122 kg (269 lb)
- Gross weight: 190 kg (419 lb)
