= Naleszkiewicz-Nowotny NN 2 =

Glider type

NN 2
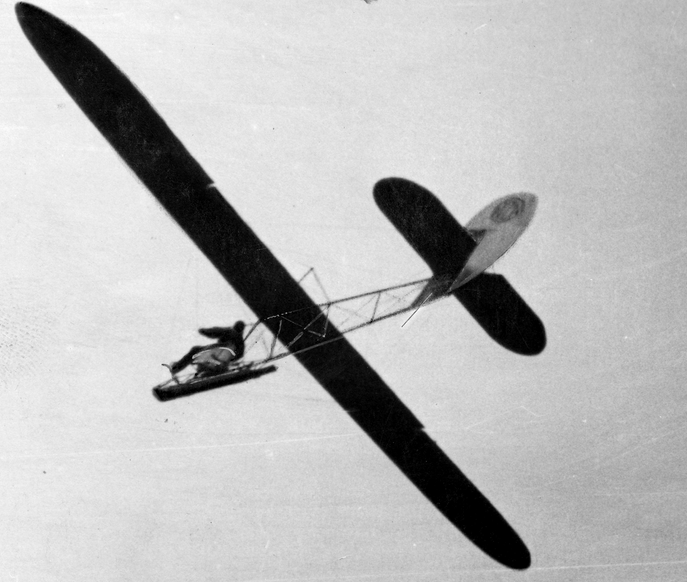

General information
- Type: Primary glider
- National origin: Poland
- Manufacturer: CWL Dęblin
- Designer: Jarosław Naleszkiewicz and Adam Nowotny
- Number built: 3

History
- First flight: Summer 1931

The Naleszkiewicz-Nowotny NN 2 was a Polish primary glider first flown in 1931. An improved version followed in 1932 but only three were built in total.

== Design and development ==
The NN 2 was a primary (basic), open frame (uncovered girder fuselage) glider of composite construction. Its wing was mounted on top of the fuselage and was rectangular in plan out to elliptical tips. It had a two-part structure, each part built around a single, wooden spar and fabric-covered. Its ailerons were slotted. Wing bracing on the first two NN 2s built was wire, running from the lower fuselage longeron and from a steel cabane, welded onto the upper longeron, over the wing centre section. The wires were replaced on the final version, the NN 2bis, by an inverted V-strut from the spar to the lower fuselage on each side.

Both versions of the NN 2 had steel tube fuselages, tapering rearwards in depth, but the girders differed in the webs that connected their upper and lower chords or longerons. On the first two examples these consisted of vertical members assisted by wire bracing but the NN 2 instead used a form of Warren girder, with diagonal members. On the NN 2 the pilot sat, completely exposed, on a seat attached the sloping, most forward cross-member and with controls on an extension of the lower longeron. That longeron also carried the forward end of a pneumatically sprung, broad, landing skid. In contrast, the pilot of the NN 2bis had an open cockpit within a nacelle with vertical sides which reached from nose to the wing trailing edge. The cross-member above the nacelle was faired in.

The empennage of both variants was wood-framed and fabric-covered. The horizontal tail was rectangular in plan out to rounded tips, with a tailplane mounted on the upper longeron carrying elevators with cut-outs for rudder movement. A near-rectangular fin, which stretched down to the lower longeron, carried a broad, curved and slightly pointed balanced rudder.

== Operational history ==
In September 1931 both NN 2s went on the sixth Lwów Aeroclub expedition to Bezmiechowa Górna. The following year the club returned with one NN 2 and the NN 2bis. The type's outstanding performance on this seventh expedition was a flight of 3 hr 56 min 29 s piloted by Kurowski.

== Variants ==
NN 2
Original version with exposed seat and wire wing-bracing. First flown 1931. Two built.
NN 2bis
Revised girder fuselage with cockpit in nacelle and with rigid wing bracing. First flown 1932. One built.

== Specifications ==
Data from Nowotny-Naleszkiewicz NN-2, j2mcl-planeurs

General characteristics

- Crew: One
- Length: 6.93 m (22 ft 9 in)
- Wingspan: 12 m (39 ft 4 in)
- Height: 2.5 m (8 ft 2 in)
- Wing area: 18 m^{2} (190 sq ft)
- Aspect ratio: 8
- Empty weight: 115 kg (254 lb)
- Gross weight: 190 kg (419 lb)

Performance

- Maximum glide ratio: 13 at 47 km/h (29 mph; 25 kn)
- Rate of sink: 0.9 m/s (180 ft/min) minimum, at 47 km/h (29 mph; 25 kn)
