= Jaworski WJ 3 =

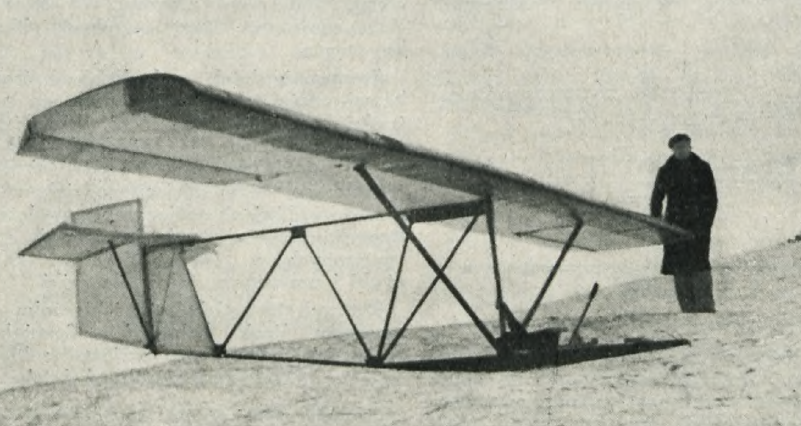

General information
- Type: Primary glider
- National origin: Poland
- Manufacturer: LOPP Gliding Circle, Stolpce
- Designer: Wictor Jaworski
- Number built: 1

History
- First flight: Early 1936

The Jaworski WJ 3 was a Polish, low-cost primary glider first flown in 1936. It did not prove popular and only one was built.

== Design and development ==
The Jaworski WJ 3 was a Polish primary glider designed in 1935 and first flown the following year. It was a single seat, open frame (uncovered flat girder fuselage), wooden aircraft, designed to keep costs to a minimum by using the cheapest construction materials and, with no welded joints, to be within the capabilities of basic workshops.

It had an undivided wing of rectangular plan mounted on top of the fuselage and built around a single spar, which was the rear part of a torsion-resistant, plywood-covered D box forming the leading edge of the wing. Behind the spar the wing was fabric-covered. A single strut on each side braced the spar to the lower fuselage. Rectangular ailerons reached out to the wing tips.

The fuselage was a modified Warren truss, with a curved lower chord or longeron and two additional, near vertical cross-members under the wing. The WJ 3's pilot sat without back support against the foremost of these on an exposed seat mounted on an extension of the lower longeron that also carried the controls. An unsprung, wooden landing skid was attached underneath.

Another vertical cross-member formed the rudder-post, reaching above the fuselage. Fabric from this to the nearest diagonal cross-member formed a fin between the longerons. Its near-rectangular rudder was generous and fabric-covered. A narrow, roughly rectangular tailplane was mounted on the upper longeron and strut braced to the lower one. It carried an elevator with two tetragonal, fabric-covered surfaces mounted on a common axle, allowing rudder movement between them.

Despite the W.J.6's low cost, build-simplicity, low weight, which allowed easy ground transport, and decent handling in flight trials only one was built.

== Specifications ==
Data from J. Cynk, 1971

General characteristics

- Crew: One
- Length: 5 m (16 ft 5 in)
- Wingspan: 8.2 m (26 ft 11 in)
- Height: 1.62 m (5 ft 4 in)
- Wing area: 10.2 m^{2} (110 sq ft)
- Aspect ratio: 6.6
- Empty weight: 65 kg (143 lb)
- Gross weight: 143 kg (315 lb)

Performance

- Maximum glide ratio: 11.5
- Rate of sink: 1.2 m/s (240 ft/min) minimum
