= Bohatyrew Miś =

Miś

General information
- Type: glider
- National origin: Poland
- Manufacturer: W.W.S. Samolot
- Designer: Michal Bohatyrew
- Number built: 1

History
- First flight: Spring 1925

The Bohatyrew Miś (English: Bear or Teddy bear) was a Polish glider which in 1925 won the Second Polish Glider Contest.

== Design and development ==
Czarna Góra did not provide the wind speeds needed for the First Polish Glider Contest, held in 1923. The organizers of the Second Contest, held in 1925, chose Oksywie near Gdynia in the search for better winds but their hopes were not rewarded and the best flights of 1923 were not approached, though more flights were made and with fewer crashes. The Second Contest began on 17 May and ended on 14 June, though only fifteen of the twenty-seven contestants flew. The Bohatyrew Miś, designed by Michal Bohatyrew who was the contest manager, was the overall winner.

The wooden Miś was built in the W.W.S Samolet factory at Ławica airfield in Poznań, which also built Hanriot aircraft under licence. Its two spar, parasol wing, which used panels from the wing of the Hanriot HD.28, was plywood-covered around the leading edge to the forward spar and fabric covered aft. It was held over the fuselage on four converging steel struts which formed a central cabane over the wing from which landing wires braced the outer wings, assisted by lift wires from the lower fuselage longerons.

The underlying fuselage structure was rectangular in section and ply-covered, though a duralumin sheet on the forward upper surface formed a tapered, pentagonal-section, slender nose. There was a single-seat, open cockpit under the wing. The empennage was wire-braced and fabric-covered. The leading edge of the tailplane, which was mounted on top of the fuselage, was straight and swept. It carried straight-edged elevators which had rounded tips and were balanced. The rudder was also round-tipped and straight-edged.

== Operational history ==
When it first appeared at the contest, the Miś had a fixed, single-axle undercarriage with the axle close to the fuselage underside and the wheels close to its sides. After receiving slight damage in a landing accident on 29 May the wheeled gear was replaced by a pair of skids.

The Miś was flown at the event by Stanislaw Wrembel. On 26 May he achieved the longest flight (65 seconds), later made the longest flight in low wind conditions (23 seconds) and also set the longest total flying time of 15 minutes 56 seconds in its twenty-six flights.

In late 1925 students of the Warsaw Technical University took the Miś on an investigation of possible gliding sites around Dukla, including the mapping of air currents. It was damaged after its first flight and not repaired.

== Specifications ==
Data from J. Cynk (1971) except where noted.

General characteristics

- Crew: One
- Length: 6 m (19 ft 8 in)
- Wingspan: 10 m (32 ft 10 in)
- Height: 2.0 m (6 ft 7 in)
- Wing area: 11 m^{2} (120 sq ft)
- Aspect ratio: 9.1
- Airfoil: Hanriot
- Empty weight: 100 kg (220 lb)
- Gross weight: 165 kg (364 lb)
