= Naleszkiewicz-Nowotny NN 1 =

NN 1
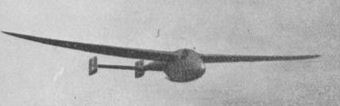

General information
- Type: experimental high performance sailplane
- National origin: Poland
- Manufacturer: CWL Dęblin
- Designer: Jarosław Naleszkiewicz and Adam Nowotny
- Number built: 1

History
- First flight: 23 October 1931

The Naleszkiewicz & Nowotny NN 1 was an experimental high performance sailplane flown in Poland in 1931. Despite having advanced features, a disappointing performance led to its early abandonment.

== Design and development ==
The 1931, aerodynamically clean NN 1 was an advanced design for its time, with cantilever wings and divided ailerons and unusual in having a triple tail. Its very streamlined forward fuselage was achieved by sacrificing forward vision from the enclosed cockpit.

Its high, two part wing, which had an approximately elliptical plan, was built around a single spar and was entirely plywood-covered. Most of the trailing edge carried narrow chord ailerons, each divided into three parts.

The NN 1 had a ply-covered, semi-monocoque, pod-and-boom fuselage, though an unusual one. In plan it tapered only gently aft but a side view shows the forward section had a deep, oval profile that blended into a more strongly tapering boom. The open cockpit, fitted with a full complement of blind-flying instruments, was cut out of the forward fuselage without a local change in profile, leaving the pilot with good sideways views but very little forward vision. Landing gear was a skid under the forward fuselage.

At the rear a narrow-chord, rectangular tailplane was mounted on top of the fuselage and carried elevators of essentially the same plan. Fins were mounted at the ends of the tailplane and carried rudders; a third fin and rudder was mounted centrally, on the fuselage. All these had an overall rectangular profile, with greater chord than height, and projected both above and below the tailplane and fuselage.

Its first, ground-towed, flight, piloted by Nowotny, was on 23 October 1931. A few days later the NN 1 was air-towed from Dęblin to Warsaw for trials. Perhaps because of directional instabilities, structural issues or poor cockpit visibility, the unexceptional performance led to an early end to the trials.

== Specifications ==
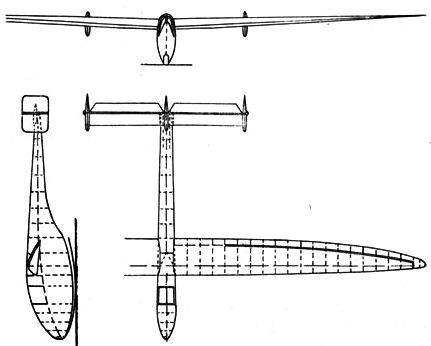
Naleszkiewicz-Nowotny NN 1

Data from j2mc planeurs :Nowotny-Naleszkiewicz NN-1, Polish Aircraft 1893-1939, SZYBOWCE : NN 1

General characteristics

- Crew: One
- Length: 7.7 m (25 ft 3 in)
- Wingspan: 16.5 m (54 ft 2 in)
- Height: 1.56 m (5 ft 1 in)
- Wing area: 15 m^{2} (160 sq ft)
- Aspect ratio: 18
- Airfoil: Bobek-Zdaniewski no.8
- Empty weight: 170 kg (375 lb)
- Gross weight: 240 kg (529 lb)

Performance

- Stall speed: 48 km/h (30 mph, 26 kn)
- Maximum glide ratio: 22 at 56 km/h (35 mph; 30 kn)
- Rate of sink: 0.77 m/s (152 ft/min) at 52 km/h (32 mph; 28 kn) minimum
- Wing loading: 16 kg/m^{2} (3.3 lb/sq ft)
