= Karpiński SL.1 Akar =

Akar

General information
- Type: glider
- National origin: Poland
- Designer: Adam Karpiński
- Number built: 1

History
- First flight: 24 August 1923

The SL.1 Akar (Gnat) was a Polish glider built to compete in the First Polish Glider Contest, held in 1923. It dominated the contest with its pilots achieving first and second places.

== Design and development ==
Reports of the first German glider contest, held at the Wasserkuppe in the late summer of 1920, generated considerable interest in Poland, leading to the First Polish Glider Contest at Czarna Góra between 30 August and 13 September 1923. The contest was not a great success, limited by novice designers and pilots and a poor site, but the SL.1 Akar was by far the most successful entrant. It was designed in 1922 by Adam Karpiński, a student in the Sekcja Lotnicza (SL), the aviation section of Warsaw Technical University and was built by other SL students.

The all-wood Akar was a cantilever monoplane with a three-part wing built around twin spars. The wing had a rectangular plan centre-section with trapezoidal outer panels and was fabric covered.

It was mounted on top of two parallel open frames, spaced about 2 m (6 ft 7 in) apart, forming its fuselage. These each had longitudinal straight upper and curved lower chords interconnected by short oblique web members and were braced together by three transverse struts. Two, one from each of the two forward-most web members, carried the pilot's seat. The chords of each frame converged at the rear, where the third transverse member carried the empennage. The tailplane was confined between the fuselage frames but the elevators projected beyond, carrying balances. There were no fins but twin roughly rectangular rudders. A forward cross-axle extending beyond the fuselage frames gave the large wheels a wide track and the upward-curving lower chords acted as skids to prevent nose-overs.

Though most of the gliders entered into the contest had not flown before its opening, the Akar had made its first flight on 24 August 1923, piloted by the designer's brother, Tadeusz. Seven flights were made before the contest began, flown by Karpiński and by Ryszard Bartel; the longest of these lasted 96 seconds and was made by Bartel. These test flights revealed good handling, with effective and balanced controls.

== Operational history ==
The Akar dominated the contest, flown both by Karpiński who was placed first and by Bartel, placed second. Its longest flight lasted 186 seconds; it made a flight of over 3 km (1.9 mi) and gained an altitude of 20 m (66 ft).

In the following spring the Akar was used by the SL to look for good gliding sites in the Babia Góra. Equipped with skis, it made a flight on 3 April 1924 (another source gives the date as 8 April) which lasted 325 s, covered about 2.5 km (1.6 mi) and set a Polish record which stood for over four years. It crashed either at the end of this flight or in a later one. After the crash, the glider was redesigned by Stanisław Prauss as the Akar II, with a rectangular section, ply-covered fuselage and a new empennage. It was entered for the Second Polish Polish Glider Contest of 1925, though it did not appear there. Though Cynk reports that the Akar II was built, another source claims that the students were blocked from using the University workshop and no rebuilding of the Akar occurred. Its remains were destroyed in the autumn of 1925.

== Specifications ==
Data from :General J. Cynk (1971); Performance Samolotypolskie.pl.

General characteristics

- Crew: One
- Wingspan: 9.3 m (30 ft 6 in)
- Wing area: 12.2 m^{2} (131 sq ft)
- Aspect ratio: 7.1
- Empty weight: 75 kg (165 lb)
- Gross weight: 140 kg (309 lb)

Performance9

- Maximum glide ratio: 9
- Rate of sink: 1.3 m/s (260 ft/min)
- Speed: 45 km/h (28 mph; 24 kn)
