= Czarna Góra, Lesser Poland Voivodeship =

Czarna Góra
- Village
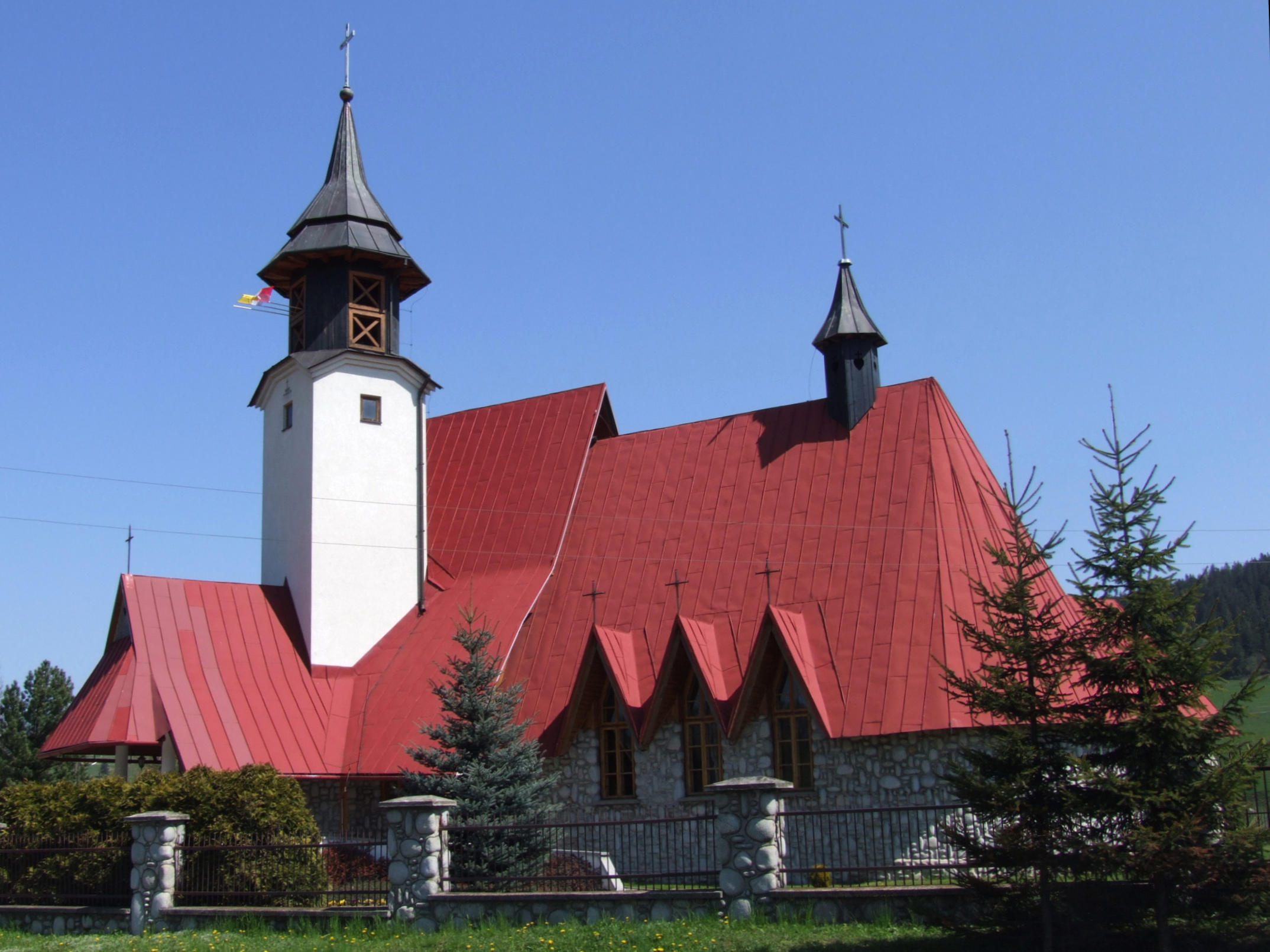
- Church of the Transfiguration
- Interactive map of Czarna Góra
- Location within Poland
- Coordinates: 49°23′11″N 20°7′59″E
- Country: Poland
- Voivodeship: Lesser Poland
- County: Tatra
- Gmina: Bukowina Tatrzańska
- Population: 1,506
- Website: http://www.gmina.bukowinatatrzanska.pl/index.php

Czarna Góra [ˈt͡ʂarna ˈɡura] (Slovak: Čierna Hora, Hungarian: Feketebérc) is a village in the administrative district of Gmina Bukowina Tatrzańska, within Tatra County, Lesser Poland Voivodeship, in southern Poland, close to the border with Slovakia.

It is one of the 14 villages in the Polish part of the historical region of Spiš (Polish: Spisz).
