= Embraer =

Brazilian aircraft manufacturer

Embraer S.A.

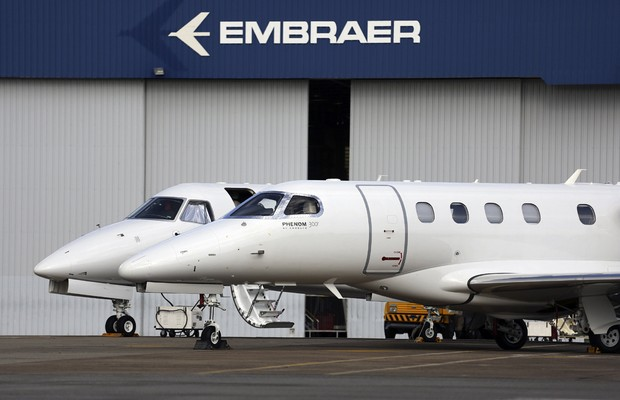
- Hangar with Embraer jets at the company headquarters, in São José dos Campos.
- Type: Sociedade Anônima
- Traded as: B3: EMBR3; NYSE: EMBJ; Ibovespa Component
- Industry: Aerospace, defense
- Founded: August 19, 1969; 57 years ago
- Founder: Ozires Silva
- Headquarters: São José dos Campos, São Paulo, Brazil
- Area served: Worldwide
- Key people: Francisco Gomes Neto (president & CEO); Raul Calfat (chairman)
- Products: Business, commercial, and military aircraft. Aircraft parts. Mission systems for air and ground operation
- Brands: EMB, ERJ, Legacy, Lineage, LR, Phenom, Praetor
- Revenue: ▲US$5.27 billion (2023)
- Operating income: ▲US$315 million (2023)
- Net income: ▲US$164 million (2023)
- Total assets: ▲US$10.8 billion (2023)
- Total equity: ▲US$3.04 billion (2023)
- Number of employees: 18,997 (2024)
- Divisions: Embraer Defense & Security; Embraer Commercial Aviation; Embraer Executive Jets
- Subsidiaries: Neiva; OGMA; ELEB; Eve Air Mobility; Atech; Bradar; SAVIS
- Website: www.embraer.com

Embraer S.A. (Brazilian Portuguese pronunciation: [ẽbɾaˈɛʁ]) is a Brazilian multinational aerospace corporation. It develops and manufactures aircraft and aviation systems, and provides leasing, equipment, and technical support services. Embraer is the third largest producer of civil aircraft after Boeing and Airbus. The company also has a significant presence in military aviation, ranking among the top 100 defense contractors. It is headquartered in São José dos Campos, São Paulo, with offices and operations in China, the Netherlands, Portugal, Singapore, and the United States.

Embraer was founded on August 19, 1969 by Ozires Silva and funded by the Brazilian government with the aim of creating a national champion for domestic aerospace technology. It initially focused on supplying military aircraft to the Brazilian Air Force, but by the 1980s began producing a series of successful commuter and regional airliners for export. The company was privatized in 1994 and began expanding to the production of larger regional airliners and smaller business jets. In 2000, Embraer became a public limited company (Sociedade Anônima) with its shares traded in both the United States (NYSE) and Brazil (B3).

Embraer has divisions for commercial, executive, military, and agricultural aviation; it also maintains an incubator for aerospace technologies and businesses. While the company continues producing aircraft for the defense sector, it is best known for the ERJ and E-Jet families of narrow-body short to medium range airliners, and for its line of business jets, including the market-leading Phenom 300. As of May 2024, Embraer has delivered more than 9,000 aircraft, including 1,800 E-Jet planes.

== History ==
Seeking to develop a domestic aircraft industry, the Brazilian government under then president Getúlio Vargas' Estado Novo made several investments in the aerospace industry during the 1940s and 1950s. However, it was not until 1969, following the establishment of the Brazilian military dictatorship after the 1964 coup d'état, that Empresa Brasileira de Aeronáutica (Brazilian Aeronautics Corporation, shortened by syllabic abbreviation to Embraer) was created as a government-owned corporation. Its first president, Ozires Silva, was a government appointee, and the company initially only produced a turboprop passenger aircraft, the Embraer EMB 110 Bandeirante. The city of São José dos Campos was chosen to host the company's headquarters because it had already hosted, since 1950, the Technological Institute of Aeronautics (ITA), the first higher education institution in Brazil dedicated to the aerospace sector.

=== Early growth ===
The Brazilian government contributed to Embraer's early growth by providing production contracts. The company sold solely to the domestic market until 1975.

While military aircraft made up the majority of Embraer's products during the 1970s and early 1980s, including the Embraer AT-26 Xavante and the Embraer EMB 312 Tucano, it debuted a regional airliner, the Embraer EMB 110 Bandeirante, which made its first flight in 1968, and the Embraer EMB 120 Brasilia, launched in 1985. Aimed at the export market, the EMB family was the first in a production series of small and regional airliners.

In addition to its own line of aircraft, beginning in 1974, Embraer was licensed by the United States' Piper Aircraft to develop, produce, and market its light airplanes, as Brazil was one of the world's leading importers of small single- or twin-engine aircraft. Piper first put together knock-down kits in its U.S. factory for Embraer to then assemble and market in Brazil and Latin America. By 1978, most parts and components were being sourced by Embraer locally. The aircraft were sold as the EMB 820 Navajo (Piper Navajo Chieftain), EMB 810 Seneca (Piper Seneca III), EMB 720 Minuano (Cherokee Six), EMB 710 Carioca aircraft (Cherokee 235 Pathfinder) and the EMB 711 Corisco (Cherokee Arrow II). Between 1974 and 2000, nearly 2,500 license-built Pipers were produced by Embraer.

=== Acquisition of Aerotec ===
Aerotec S/A Indústria Aeronáutica was a design and manufacturing company founded in São José dos Campos in 1962 under the auspices of the Brazilian General Command for Aerospace Technology. Beginning in the late 1960s, the firm manufactured a two-seat trainer for the Brazilian Air Force, the Aerotec Uirapuru. A small number were also built for the civilian market, and others were exported to other Latin American countries.

By 1980, Aerotec's main business was producing components for Embraer. However, around this time, the Brazilian Air Force became interested in an upgraded version of the Uirapuru. A prototype, designated Uirapuru II, was built; but, by the time it flew, the Air Force no longer required it. A small number were built for export. In 1987, the firm was sold to Embraer.

=== Privatization ===
Born from a Brazilian government plan and having been state-run, Embraer eventually started a privatisation process in 1992 alongside other state-run companies, such as Telebrás and Vale. Privatisation was a key policy of the economically liberal government of Fernando Collor, elected in the 1989 presidential election.

Embraer was sold to private investors on December 7, 1994, which helped it avoid a looming bankruptcy. The Brazilian government retained interest through possession of golden shares, which allow it veto power. Embraer continued to win government contracts throughout the 2000s and 2010s.

=== Initial public offerings ===
In 2000, Embraer made simultaneous initial public offerings on the NYSE and BM&F Bovespa stock exchanges. As of 2008 its NYSE-traded shares were American depositary receipts representing four BM&F Bovespa shares and it was partially owned by the Bozano Group (11.10%), Previ (16.40%), Sistel (7.40%), Dassault Aviation (2.1%), EADS (2.1%), Thales (2.1%), Safran (1.1%), and the government of Brazil (0.3% and golden share), the remainder being publicly traded.

As of December 31, 2014 the shareholders with more than 5% of the company's capital were:

- OppenheimerFunds, 12.29%
- Caixa de Previdência dos Funcionários do Banco do Brasil, 6.71%
- Baillie Gifford, 6.46%
- BNDESPAR, 5.31%.

=== Product line expansion: military, regional and executive ===
In the mid-1990s, the company pursued a product line focused on small commercial airplanes over the military aircraft that had previously made up the majority of its manufacturing. It soon expanded to the production of larger regional airliners in the 70–110 seat range, and smaller business jets.

By May 2019, Embraer considered developing a new family of turboprop regional airliners in the 50–70 seat range, complementing the E-Jet E2, so as to free engineering resources. It would compete against older ATR and Dash 8 designs for 1.5 to 2 h flights over 500–700 nmi (930–1,300 km). In August 2021, Embraer released a new configuration with quieter aft-mounted engines for a 70-90 seat aircraft, with the E-Jet cross-section, aiming for a 2022 launch and a 2027/2028 service entry.

In March 2026, Embraer launched the first JAS F-39 Gripen for the Brazilian Air Force, result of technology transfer agreements signed between the Brazilian and Swedish governments in 2014, for the co-production and development of the fighter.

=== Executive jets ===
At the 2000 Farnborough Airshow, Embraer introduced the Legacy 600, a business jet variant of the Embraer Regional Jet, which entered service in 2002. Embraer Executive Jets was created as a dedicated subsidiary in 2005. That same year, the Phenom 100 was envisioned as an air taxi similar to the Eclipse 500, competing with Cessna and Hawker Beechcraft. It was introduced in 2008 and is the basis of the larger Phenom 300. The midsize Legacy 450 and Legacy 500 were jointly developed as clean sheet designs, while the Lineage 1000 is a VIP version of the E190. In 2016, Embraer delivered its 1,000th executive jet and had a market share of 17% by volume, though it lacked an ultra-long-range large cabin jet. In October 2018 Embraer announced two new business jets—the Praetor 500 in the midsize cabin category—and the Praetor 600 in the super midsize category.

As of 2026, Embraer remains dominant in the market for small and medium-sized private jets, with the Phenom 300 remaining the best seller in its class for the 14th year.

=== Military transport ===
On April 19, 2007, Embraer announced it was considering the production of a twin-jet military transport. Work began in May 2009 with funding from the Brazilian Air Force. Correios, the Brazilian postal service, has shown interest in buying this aircraft. Using much of the technology developed for the Embraer 190, the C-390 would carry up to 23 tons of cargo and aims to replace Cold War-era cargo aircraft.

As a result, Embraer developed the C-390 Millennium, a medium-size, twin-engine, jet-powered military transport aircraft with multi-role capability adapted to various missions. Brazil has been operating 6 units since 2019. Initially, thirty aircraft (including two prototypes) were to be delivered to the Brazilian Air Force. In February 2022, a new agreement was reached to supply 22 aircraft, with deliveries scheduled until 2034.

The KC-390, also known by its export name C-390 Millennium, has been an export success with several countries purchasing the aircraft or entering negotiations. Known orders and selections include:

- Portugal: 6 units.
- Hungary: 2 units.
- Austria: 4 units.
- Netherlands: 5 units.
- Greece: 3 units.
- Czech Republic: 2 units.
- South Korea: 3 units delivered, with an undisclosed number of additional units closed.
- Sweden: 4 units.
- Uzbekistan: 2 units.
- Lithuania: 3 units.
- United Arab Emirates: 10 units, with an option to expand to 20.

=== Government subsidy controversy ===
Brazil and Canada engaged in an international, adjudicated trade dispute over government subsidies to domestic plane-makers in the late 1990s and early 2000s. The World Trade Organization determined that both countries had provided illegal subsidies to what were supposed to be privately owned industries. Brazil ran an illegal subsidy program, Proex, benefiting its national aviation industry from at least 1999–2000, and Canada illegally subsidized its indigenous regional airliner industry including in export contracts, comprising Bombardier Aerospace.

=== Failed Boeing-Embraer joint venture ===
On July 5, 2018, a joint venture with Boeing was announced that would have resulted in Boeing owning 80% of Embraer's commercial aviation division. This was seen as a reaction to Airbus' acquisition of a majority stake in the competing Bombardier CSeries the previous year. Under the 2018 plan, Embraer would retain its executive business jet and defence businesses. The resulting division would be known as Boeing Brasil – Commercial, though it was unclear whether the aircraft would be rebranded as Boeing models.

On November 18, 2019, Boeing and Embraer announced another joint venture, at 49% and 51% respectively, to promote and develop new markets for the C-390 Millennium tactical transport aircraft; the resulting entity would be called Boeing Embraer – Defense and would begin operating after regulatory approvals and closing conditions.

In April 2020, Boeing canceled its acquisition of Embraer's commercial operations after being heavily affected financially by the air crisis initiated by the COVID-19 pandemic and by the 737 MAX groundings. In November 2020, Embraer announced that its loss for the third quarter of the year was $121 million due to the COVID-19 pandemic and the travel restrictions.

=== STOUT light military transport aircraft ===
In December 2019, Embraer and the Brazilian Air Force tackled the development of a light military transport aircraft. The Short Take Off Utility Transport (STOUT) would replace its 64 EMB-110 Bandeirante (average age of 38.3 years) and 19 EMB-120 Brasilia (average age of 26.5 years) with similar dimensions.

=== Growing demand and expansion ===
Since the COVID-19 pandemic, Embraer has experienced record growth driven by high demand for its smaller passenger planes, private jets, and military aircraft. In March 2024, United Airlines announced that the Embraer E175 fleet of its regional airline SkyWest, the world's largest operator of the E175, would be refurbished to increase storage space. The same month, American Airlines announced the purchase of 90 E175 aircraft in March, which will result in its entire regional fleet comprising Embraer aircraft by the end of the decade.

On May 2, 2024, Embraer delivered its 1,800th E-Jet aircraft, an E190-E2, to Royal Jordanian; less than a week later, the company delivered its first aircraft, also an E190-E2, to Scoot.

In 2026, Embraer reported that its order backlog had reached a record $34.5 billion; up to 255 planes are expected to be delivered by the end of the year, compared to 141 five years earlier, and an average of 90 every year before the pandemic. Much of the growth is led by the E2 line, due to increased travel on regional, short distance routes, as well as its relatively fast delivery time of less than two years. The company aims to expand production of E2 aircraft and enter the Turkish and Chinese markets before 2030.

Embraer's growth has prompted speculation that it may enter the narrow-body segment currently dominated by the Airbus A320neo and Boeing 737 Max. As of 2026, the company has made no formal commitment to expand beyond its current offerings.

== Organization ==
Embraer is organized into four segments: Commercial Aviation, which manages the development, production, sale, and lease of commercial jets, as well as the provision of aviation support services; Defense & Security, which consists of research, development, production, modification, and support for military defense aircraft, and related products and services; Executive Aviation, which concerns the development, production, and sale of executive jets, and support services; and Other, which entails the production of structural parts, mechanical and hydraulic systems, agricultural crop-spraying aircraft, and customer training.

=== Corporate affairs ===
The key trends of Embraer are (as at the financial year ending December 31):

Year	Revenue (US$ b)	Net income (US$ m)	Employees	Refs
2013	6.2	342	21,648	
2014	6.2	334	22,301	
2015	5.9	69.2	23,050	
2016	6.2	178	20,348	
2017	2.5	264	20,320	
2018	5.0	–178	20,530	
2019	5.4	–322	21,271	
2020	3.7	–731	18,125	
2021	4.1	–44.7	18,320	
2022	4.5	–185	19,475	
2023	5.3	164		
2024	6.4	310.5	20,000+	

== Production bases and facilities ==
The company's headquarters and main production base are in São José dos Campos, São Paulo, Brazil. It also has production bases in the State of São Paulo at Botucatu, Eugênio de Melo (a district of São José dos Campos) and Gavião Peixoto. The company has offices in Beijing, Fort Lauderdale, Amsterdam, Singapore, and Washington, D.C.

=== Non-Brazilian main facilities ===
- Production facilities for the Phenom 100EV and 300E, and Praetor 500 and 600 at Melbourne Orlando International Airport in Florida.

== Subsidiaries ==
- EAMS – Embraer Aircraft Maintenance Services Inc. (Nashville, TN, U.S.) – maintenance services site.
- OGMA – Indústria Aeronáutica de Portugal (Alverca do Ribatejo, Portugal) – aircraft component maintenance, repair and manufacturing, plus aircraft maintenance services.
- Embraer Aircraft Holding, Inc. – Its U.S. headquarters are in Fort Lauderdale, Florida, in a facility founded in 1979. Its external relations office is in Washington, D.C.
- Embraer Aero Seating Technologies – Inaugurated in September 2016 in the city of Titusville, Florida, Embraer Aero Seating Technologies produces aircraft seats.
- Mesa Unit (Located in Mesa, Arizona, U.S.) – Implemented in 2008, performs maintenance, repair and overhaul services on the Phenom and Legacy executive aircraft line.
- Windsor Locks Unit (Located in Windsor Locks, Connecticut, U.S.) – Implemented in 2008, as well as the Mesa Unit, also performs maintenance, repair and revision services in Embraer's executive line.
- ELEB – Subsidiary company specializing in the design and manufacture of landing gear systems and aircraft hydraulic and mechanical components.
- Melbourne Unit (Located in Melbourne, Florida, U.S.) – Implemented in 2011, it is the first unit in the United States to carry out the final assembly of aircraft. It produces the line of executives Phenom 100 and Phenom 300. In November 2012 work began on an Engineering and Technology Center at the Melbourne facility.
- ECC Leasing – Embraer's in-house leasing division, based in Dublin, Ireland, managing and re-marketing the Embraer aircraft portfolio owned directly by the manufacturer.
- Eve - Subsidiary company that develops electric vertical take-off and landing (eVTOL) aircraft and urban air mobility infrastructure. It merged with a special-purpose acquisition company (SPAC), Zanite Acquisition Corp, in May 2022. The merging gave Eve an easier access to NYSE listing. Embraer have announced plans to build a new factory for the manufacturing of Eve's electric air taxi.

=== Joint ventures ===
- Harbin Embraer – Agreement between Embraer and Harbin Aircraft Corporation of China to build the ERJ family aircraft for the Chinese market. The program officially concluded in 2016 after delivering nearly 40 commercial and executive aircraft.
- Boeing – Embraer's commercial airliner portfolio, as well as the KC-390, would be part of two separate joint ventures with Boeing. In the case of the civil aircraft line, Boeing would own an 80% stake in Embraer’s commercial aviation division. Boeing walked away from the deal in April 2020, citing the impact of the COVID-19 pandemic and claiming Embraer hadn't met certain closing conditions. In September 2024, the dispute finally ended after a legal arbitration when Boeing agreed to pay Embraer $150 million to settle all claims regarding the failed joint venture.
- Adani Defence & Aerospace – Embraer and Adani Group of India signed a memorandum of understanding (MoU) in December 2025 on setting up a final assembly line in India for commercial aircraft having a seating capacity of 70–146 passengers. Adani Defence & Aerospace, the flagship company of the Adani Enterprises, signed an agreement with Embraer on 27 January at the Wings India to develop an integrated regional transport aircraft ecosystem in India. Firstly, an assembly line will be established followed by a phased increase in indigenisation to support India's Regional Transport Aircraft (RTA) program under the UDAN programme. On 21 February 2026 the firms signed an enhanced MoU to establish a production ecosystem for E-175 in India. Under the agreement, a final assembly line (FAL) for the aircraft will be set up in India.
- Mahindra Group – On 17 October 2025, Embraer Defense & Security and Mahindra Group signed a strategic cooperation agreement to advance the C-390 Millennium aircraft for the Indian Air Force Medium Transport Aircraft (MTA) programme.
- Hindalco Industries – On 20 February 2026, Embraer signed an MoU with Hindalco Industries, an Indian aluminium manufacturing company, to explore and assess potential sources for aerospace-grade aluminium manufacturing in India.

== Aircraft models ==
=== Commercial ===
By December 2018, Embraer claimed to lead the sub 150 seat jetliner market with 100 operators of the ERJ and E-Jet families.

==== Current ====
- Embraer E-Jet family
  - Embraer E170 (66–78 passengers)
  - Embraer E175 (76–88 passengers)
  - Embraer E190 (96–114 passengers)
  - Embraer E195 (100–124 passengers)
- Embraer E-Jet E2 family
  - Embraer E175-E2 (80–90 passengers)
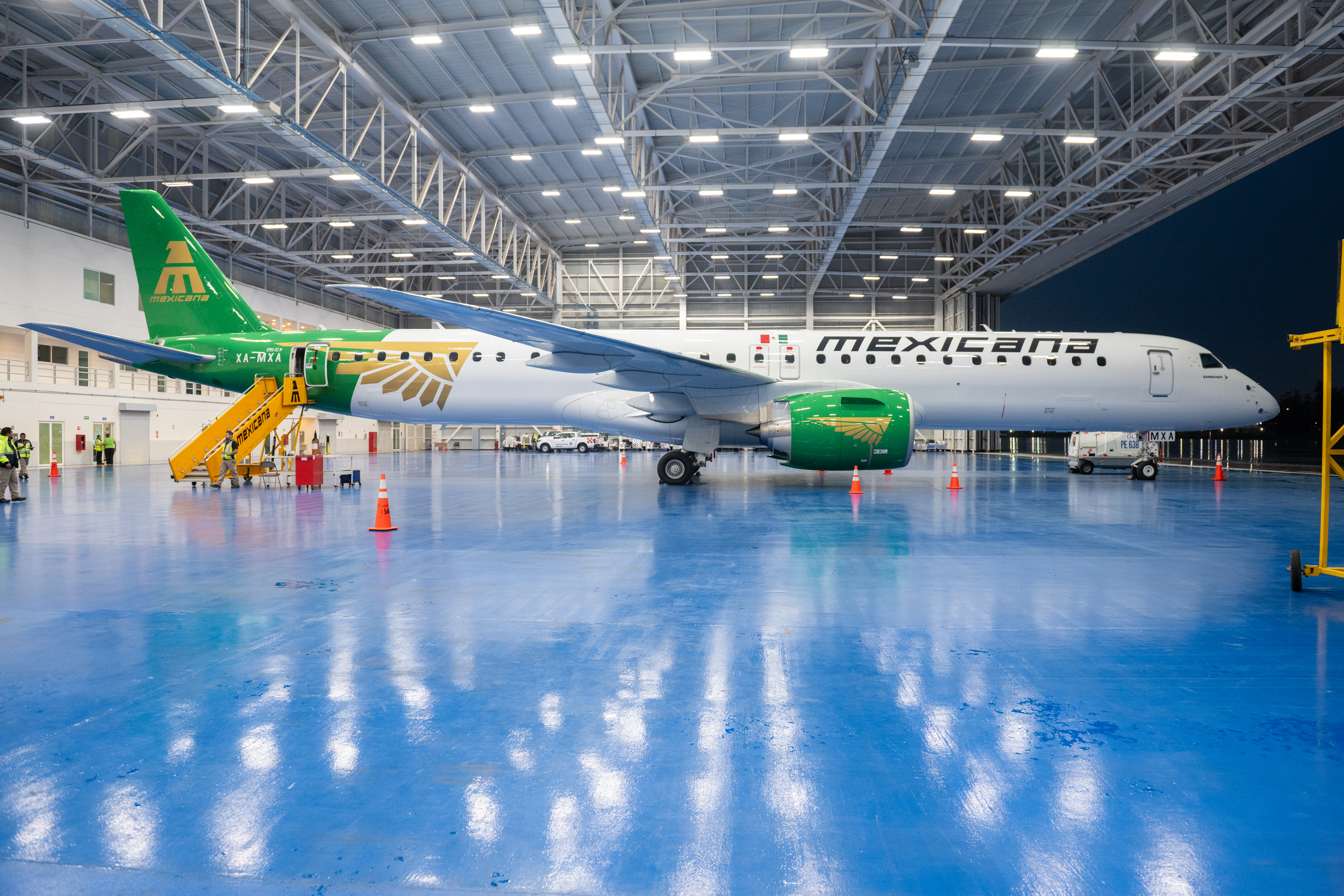
    Embraer E195-E2
  - Embraer E190-E2 (97–114 passengers)
  - Embraer E195-E2 (120–146 passengers)

==== Former ====
- Embraer EMB 110 Bandeirante (18 passengers)
- Embraer EMB 120 Brasilia (30 passengers)
- Embraer ERJ family
  - Embraer ERJ 135 (37 passengers)
  - Embraer ERJ 140 (44 passengers)
  - Embraer ERJ 145 (50 passengers)
- Embraer/FMA CBA 123 Vector (prototype)
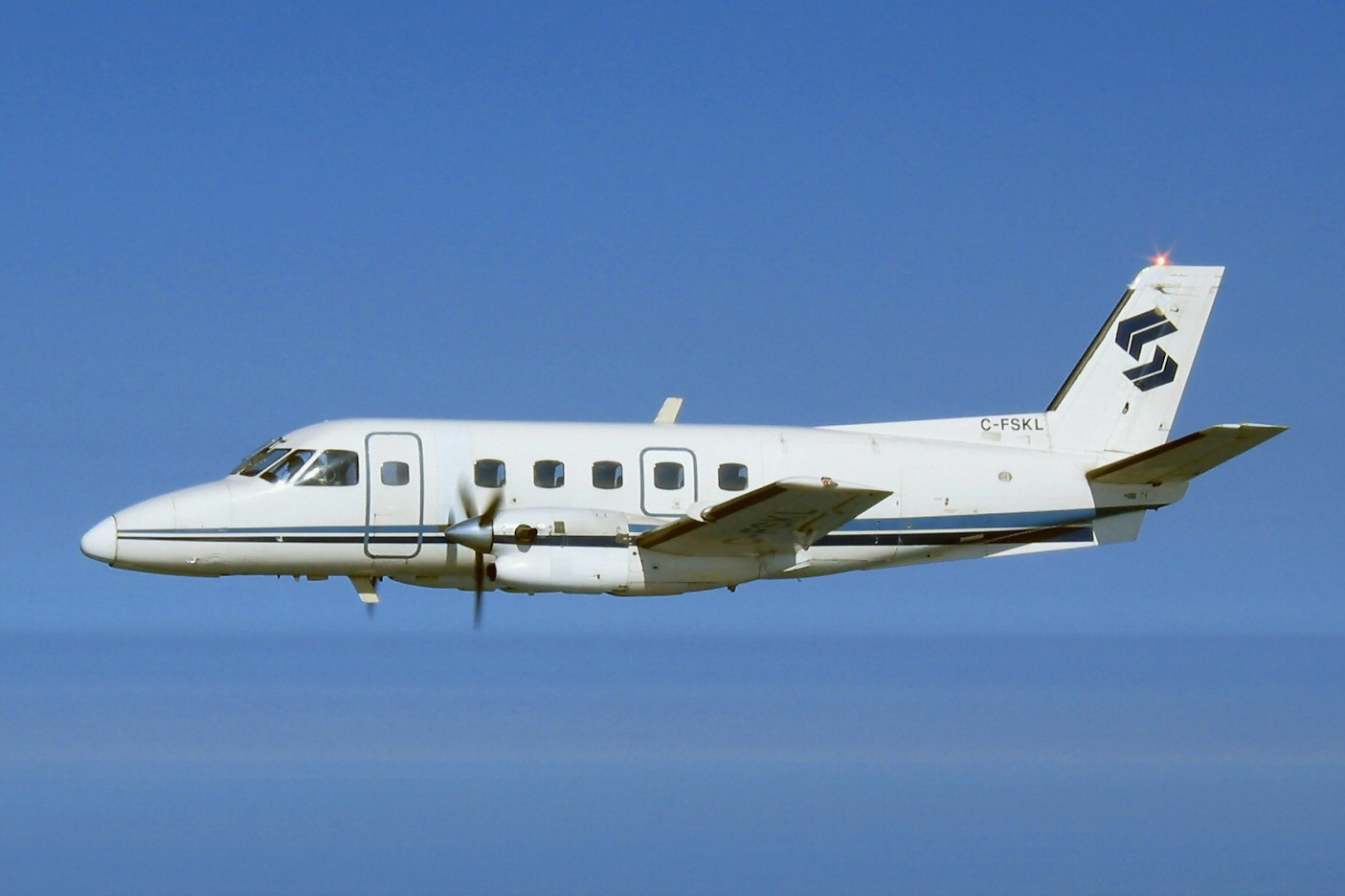
Embraer EMB 110 Bandeirante

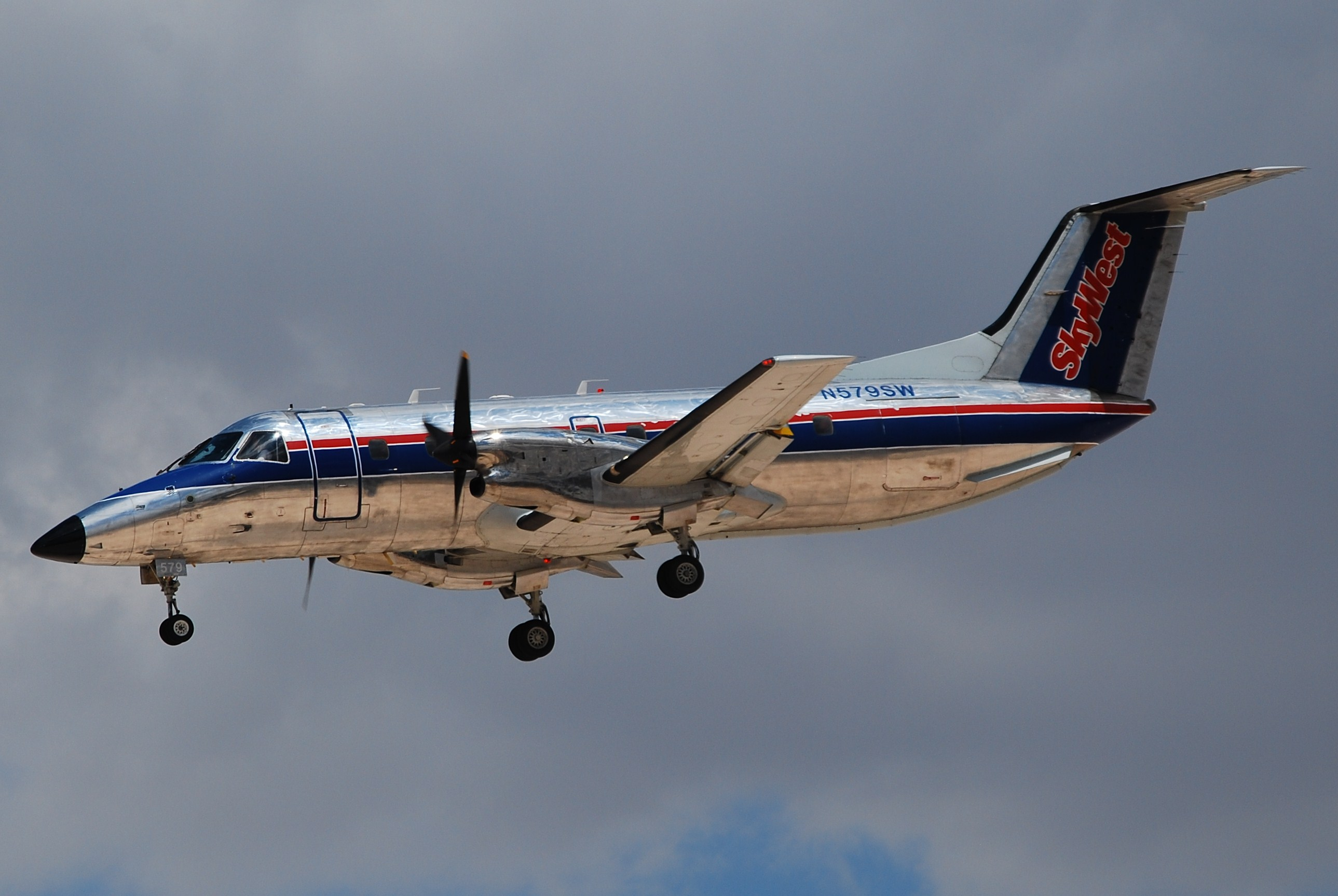
Embraer EMB 120 Brasilia

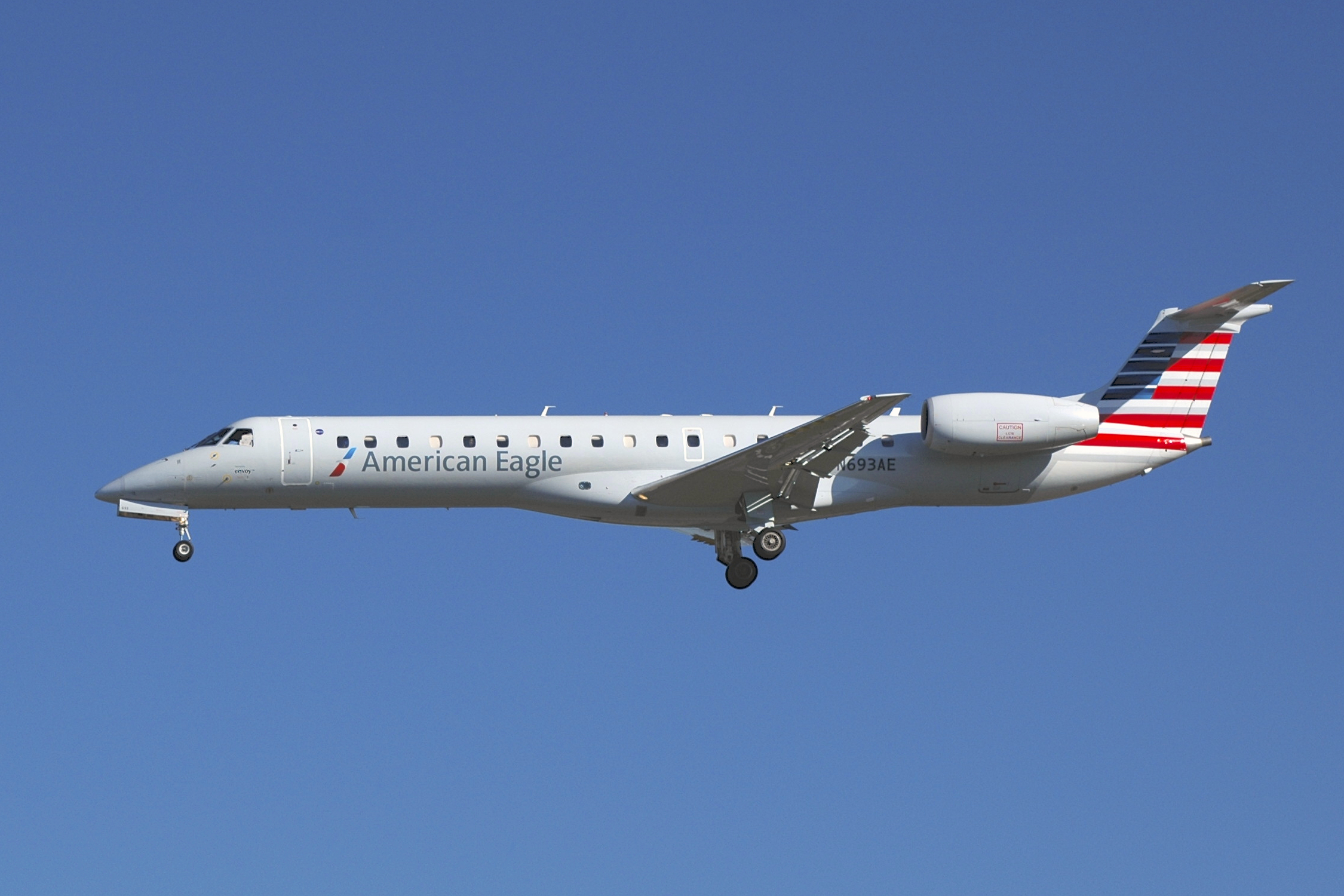
Embraer ERJ family (ERJ 145)

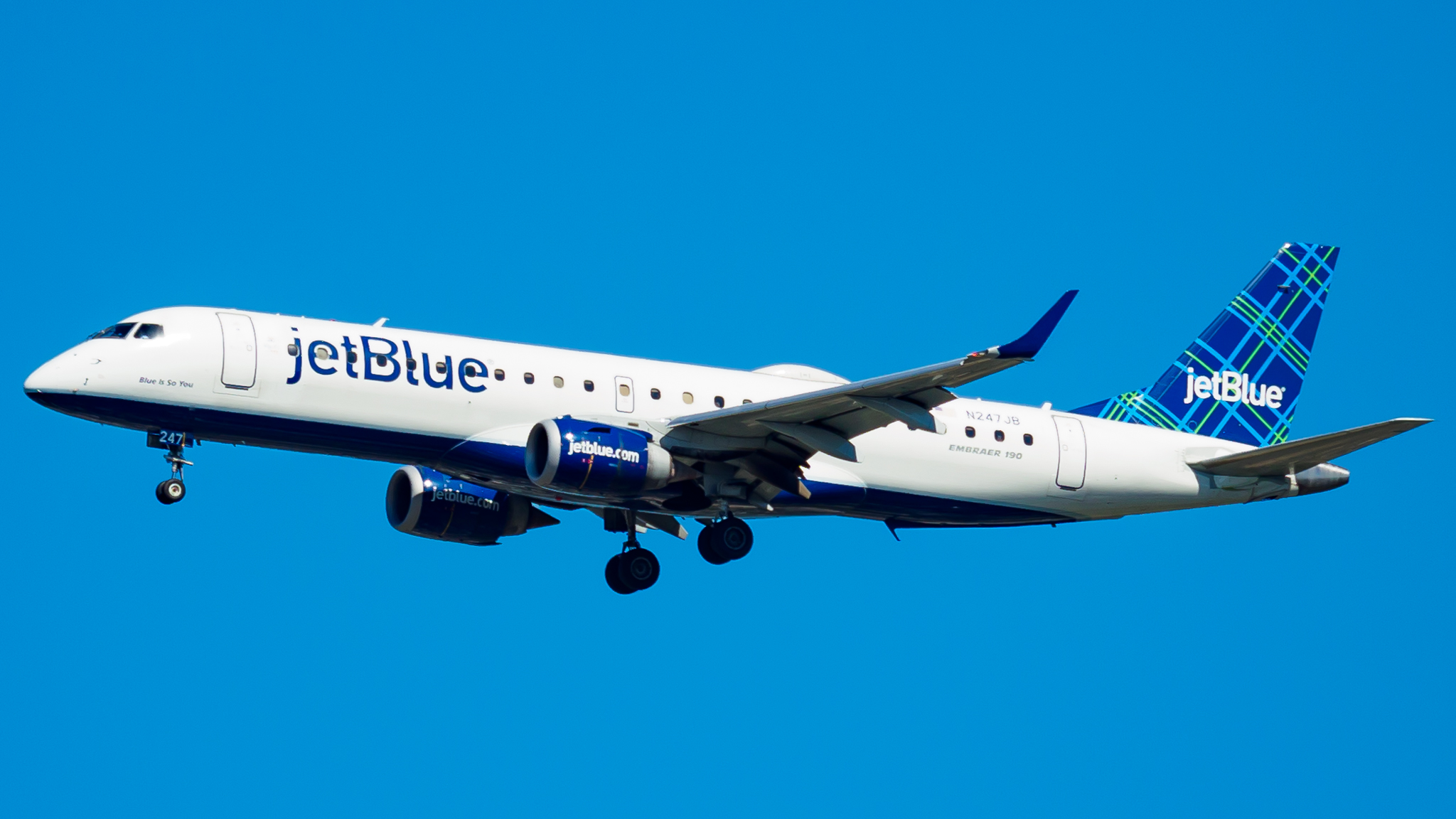
Embraer E-Jet family (Embraer 190)

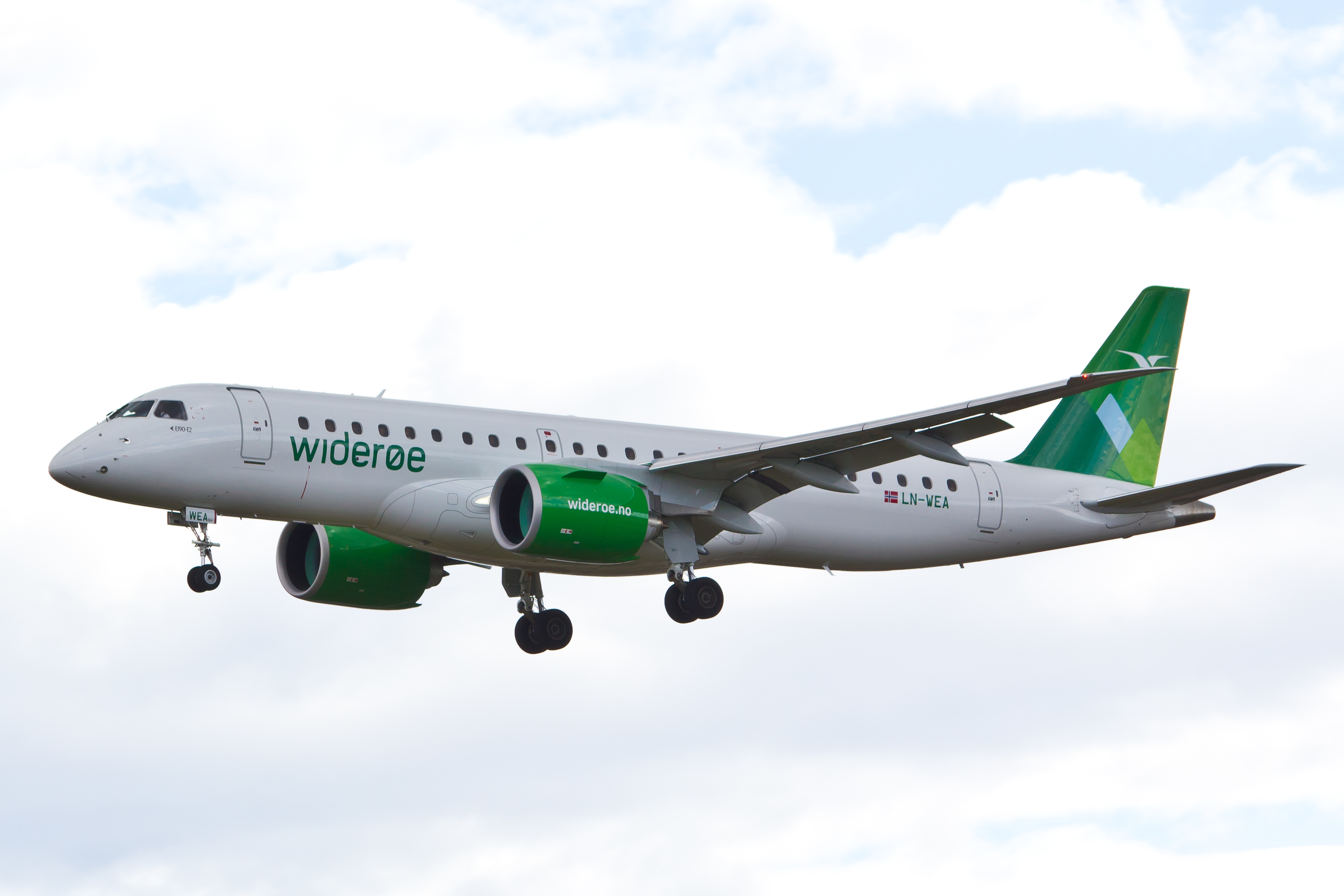
Embraer E-Jet E2 family (Embraer 190-E2)

=== Military ===
==== Current ====
- Embraer EMB 314 Super Tucano (light attack)
- Embraer C-390 Millennium (medium transport)
- Embraer R-99 (Airborne early warning and control)
- JAS 39 Gripen E/F (multirole fighter)

==== Former ====
- Embraer EMB 111 Bandeirante (light transport)
- Embraer EMB 312 Tucano (trainer)
- AMX International AMX (attack jet)
- Embraer MFT-LF (trainer/light attack, prototype only)
- Embraer Xavante (localized variant of the Aermacchi MB-326)
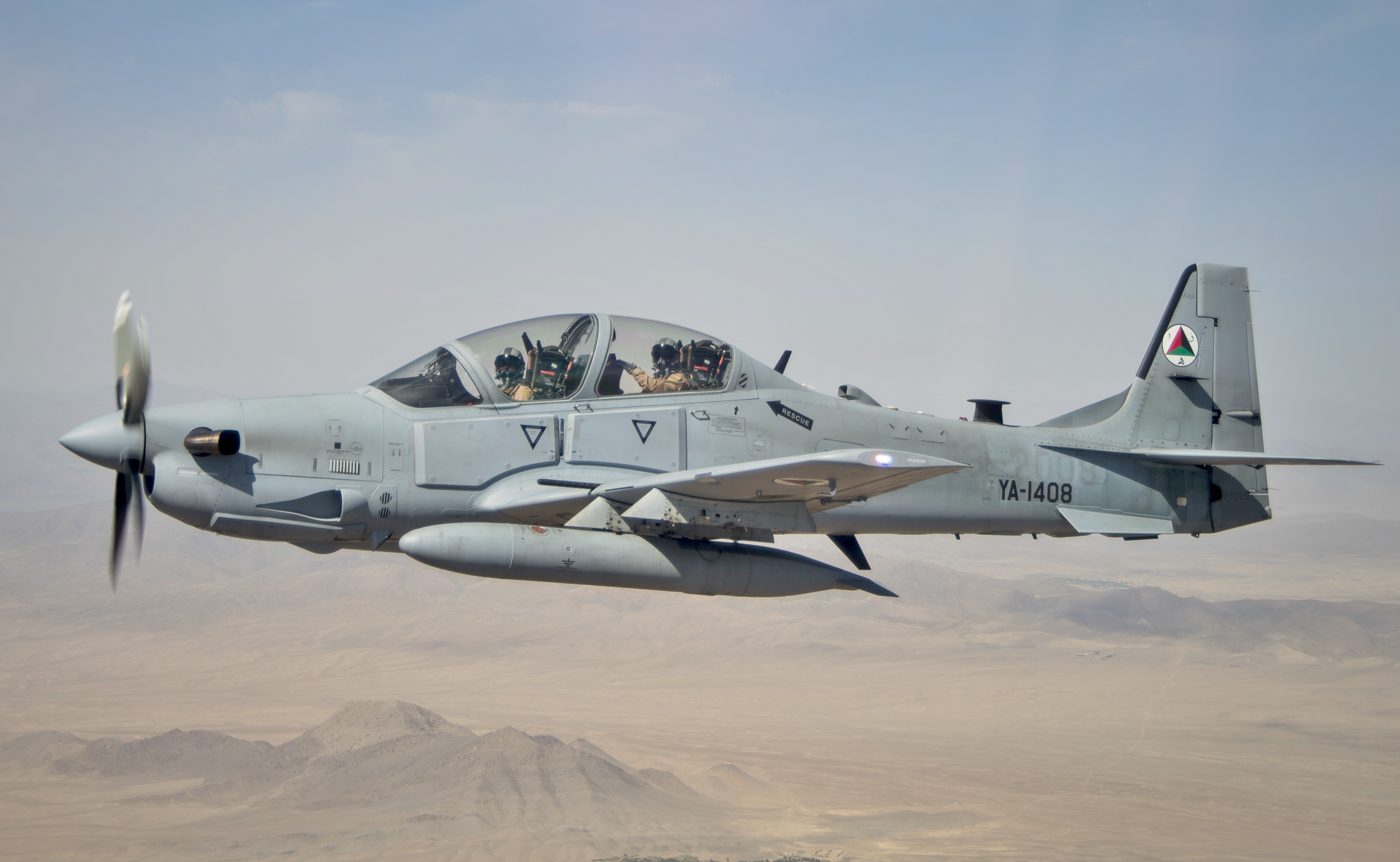
Embraer EMB 314 Super Tucano

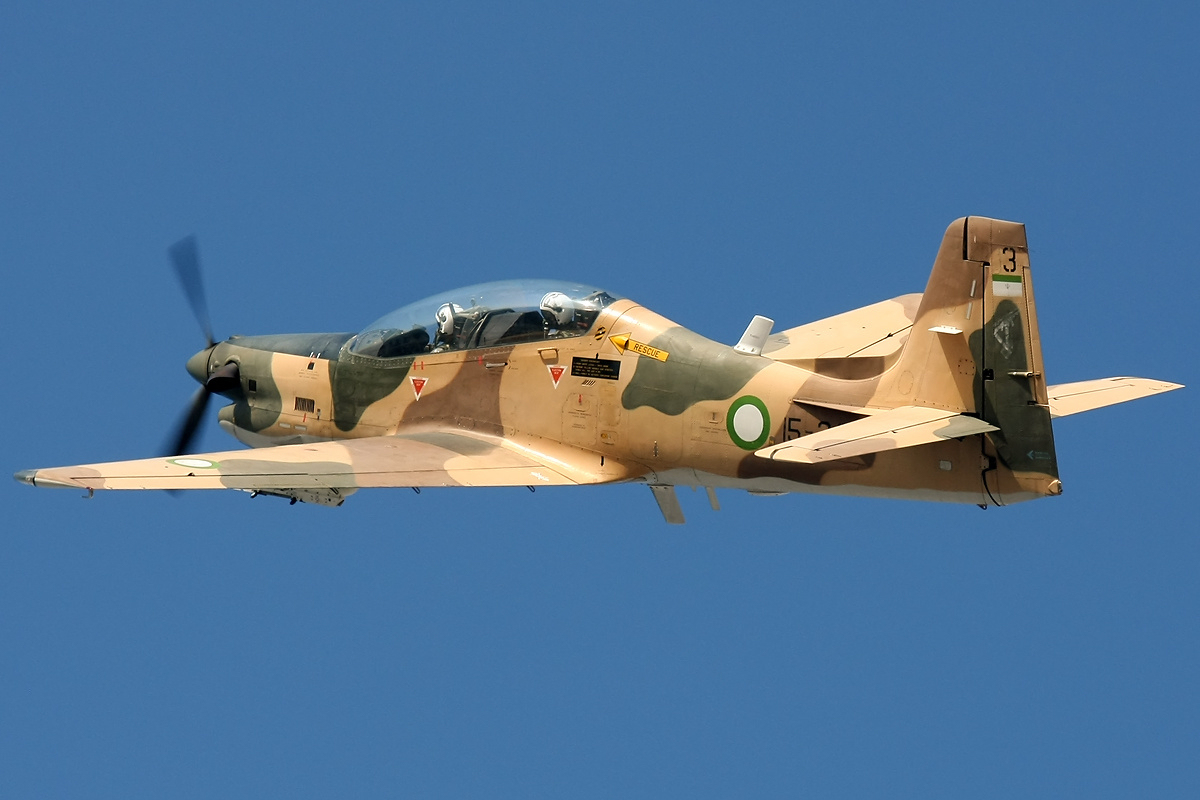
Embraer EMB 312 Tucano

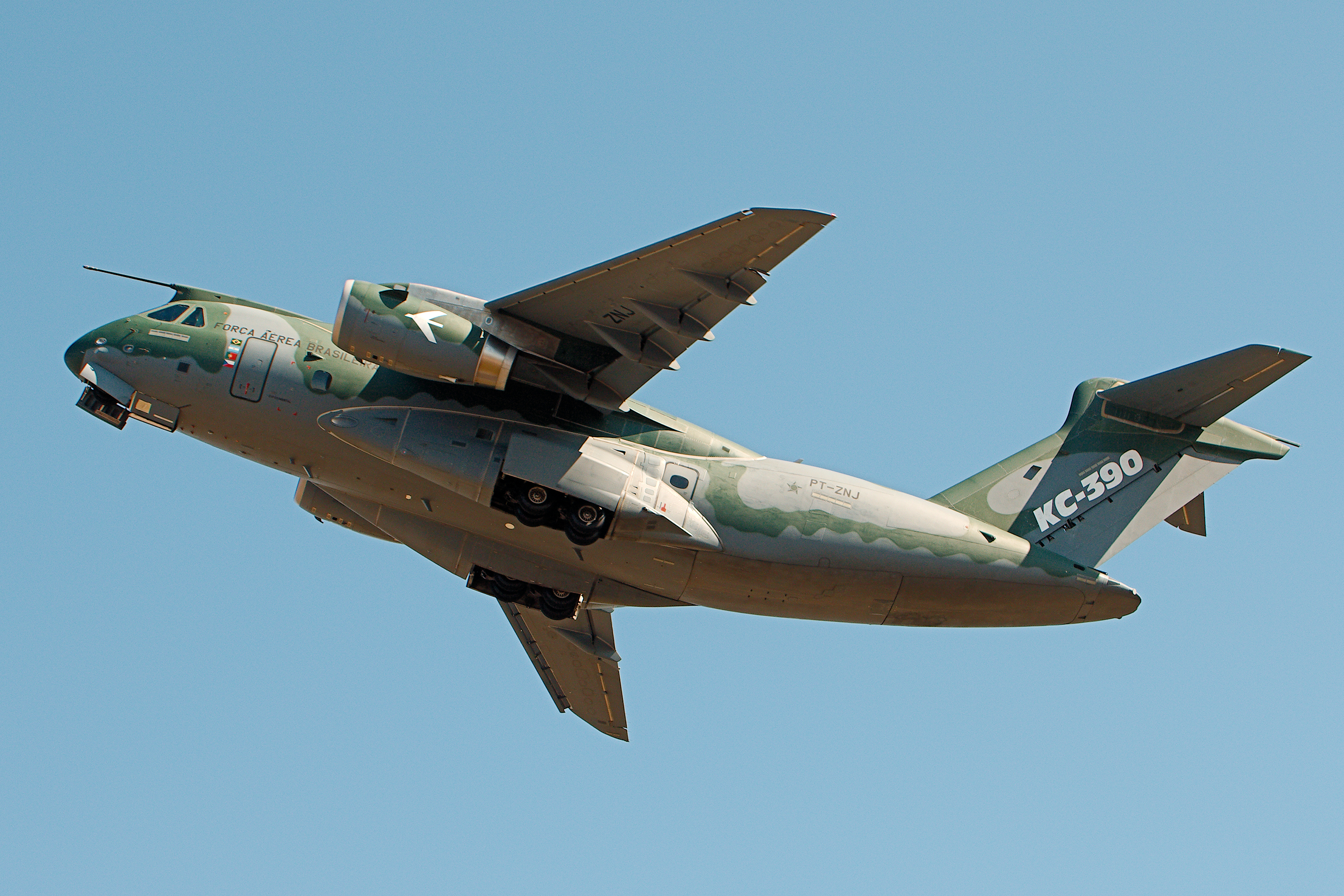
Embraer C-390 Millennium

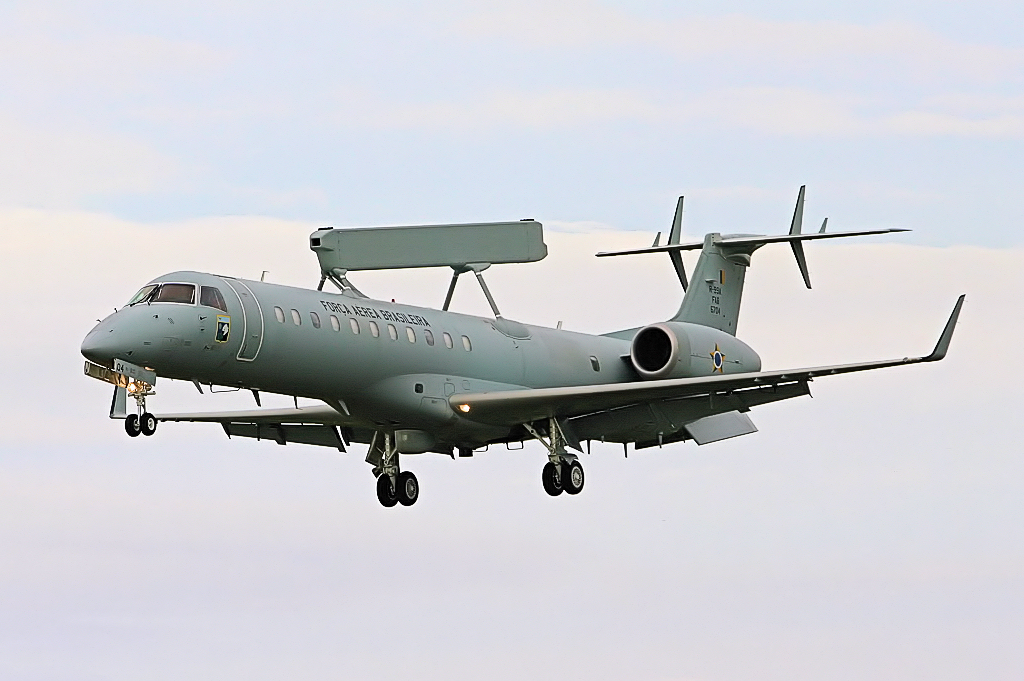
Embraer R-99

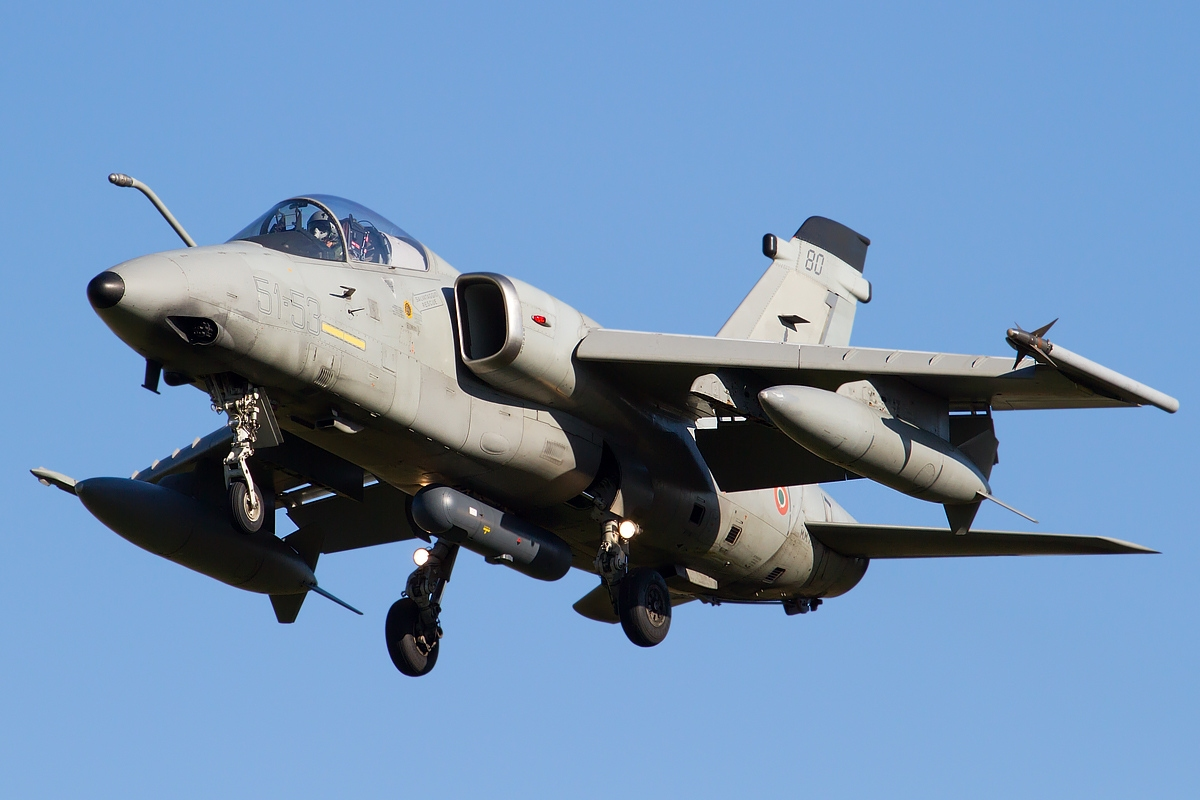
AMX

=== Business jets ===
==== Current ====
- Embraer Phenom 100 (very light jet)
- Embraer Phenom 300 (light jet)
- Embraer Praetor 500 (mid-size jet)
- Embraer Praetor 600 (super mid-size jet)

==== Former ====
- Embraer Legacy 450 (mid-size jet)
- Embraer Legacy 500 (super mid-size jet)
- Embraer Legacy 600/650 (large jet, developed from the ERJ family)
- Embraer Lineage 1000 (ultra-large jet, developed from the E-Jet family)
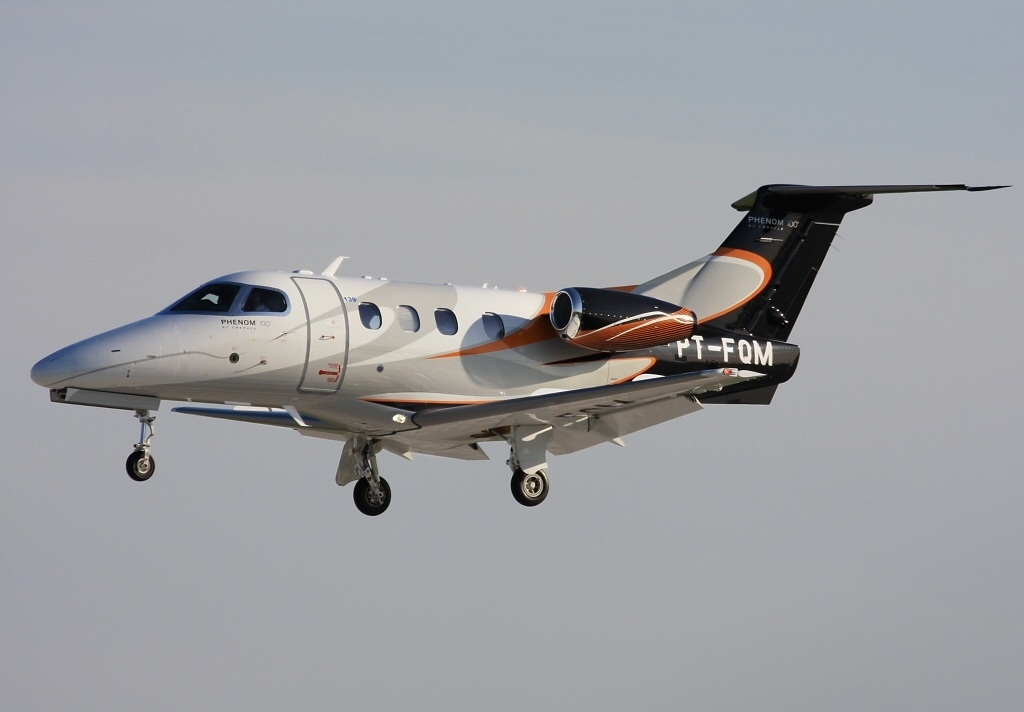
Embraer Phenom 100

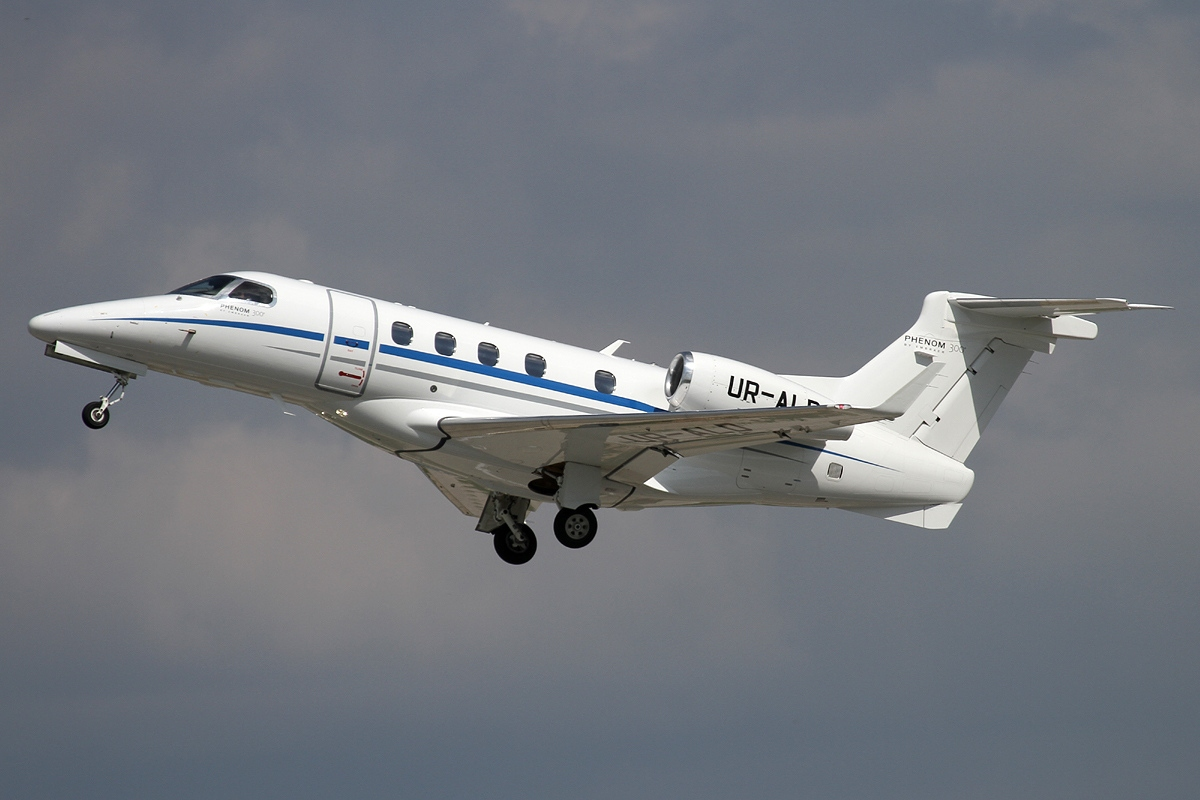
Embraer Phenom 300

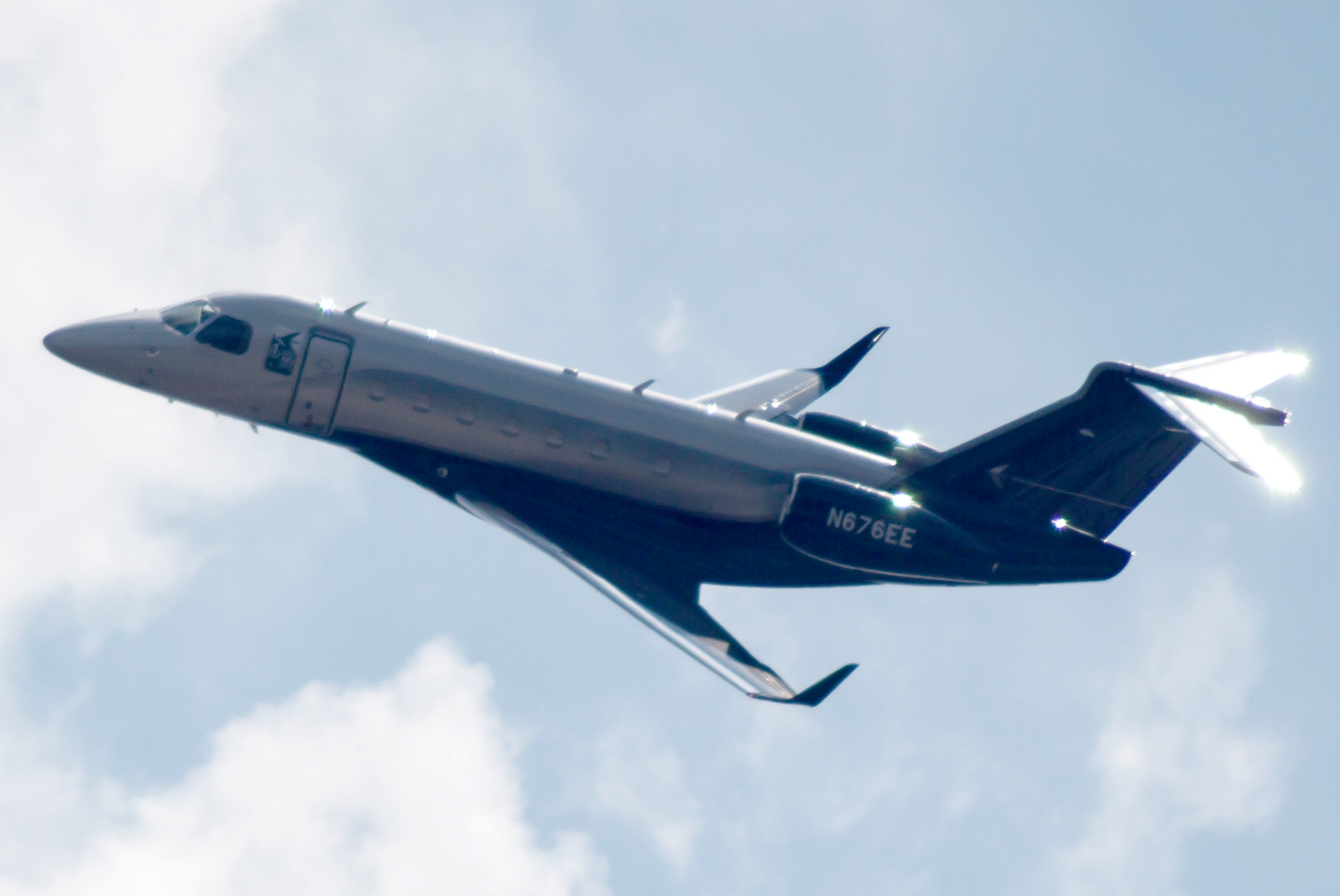
Legacy 450/500/Praetor 500/600

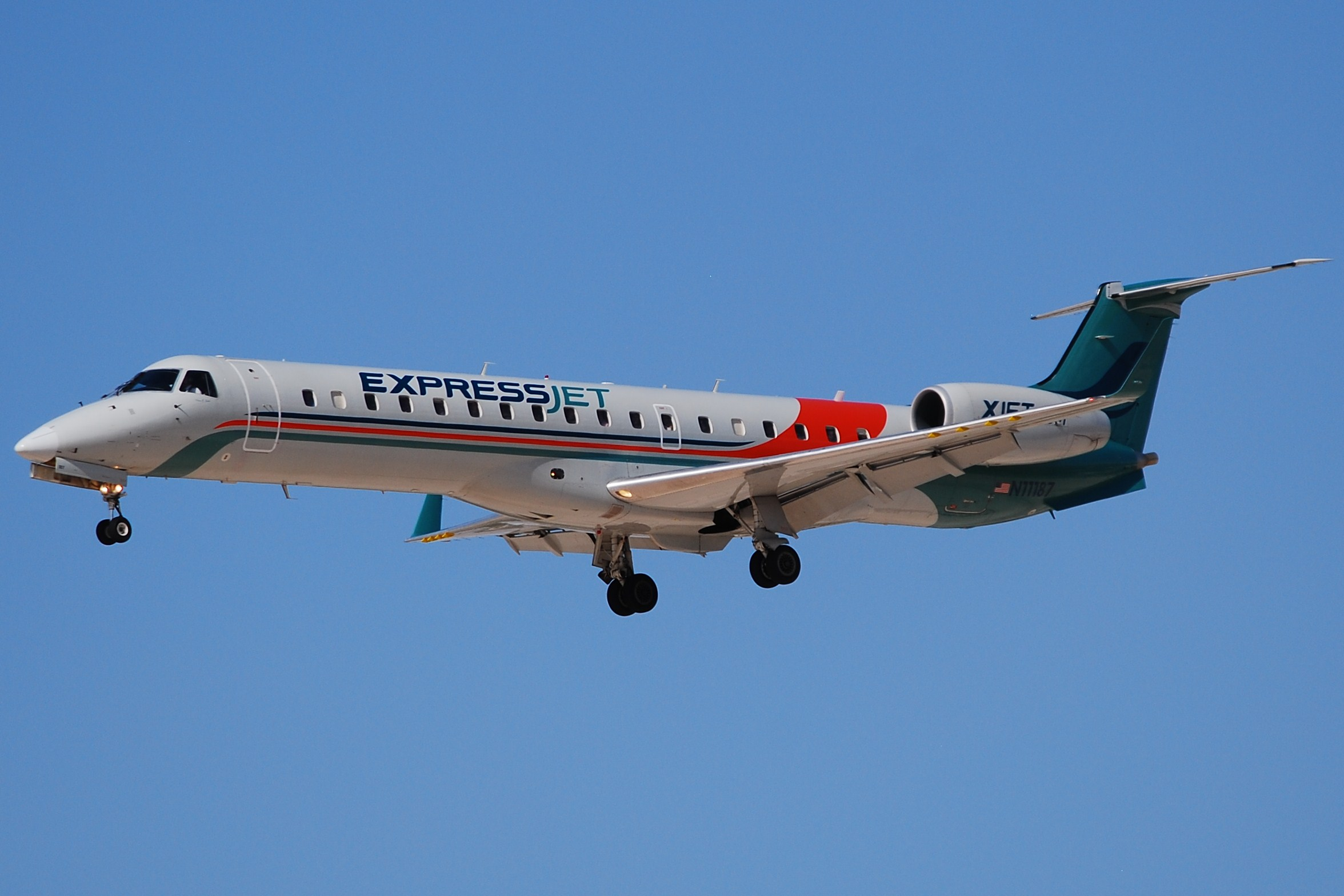
Embraer Legacy 600

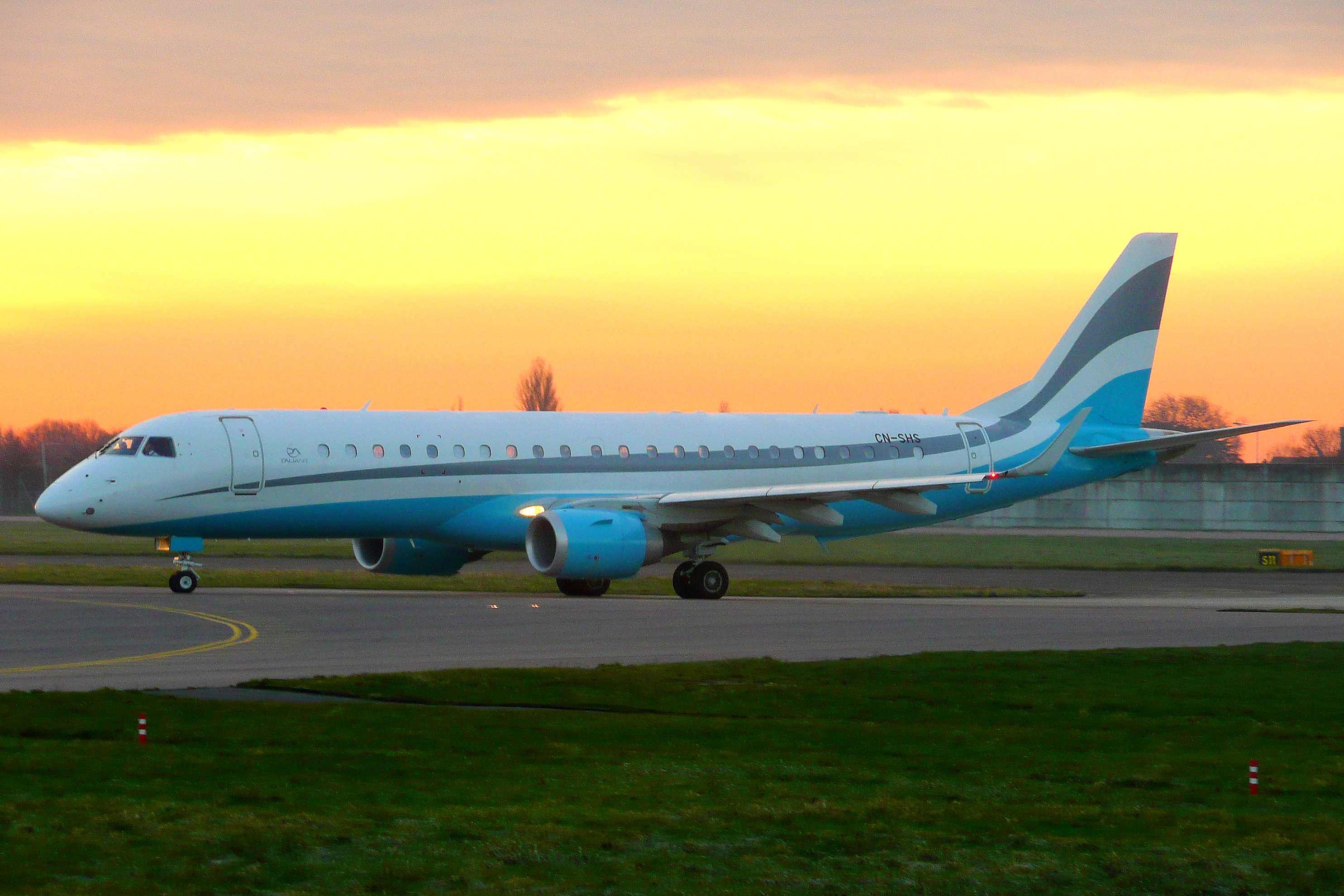
Embraer Lineage 1000

=== Utility ===
==== Current ====
- Embraer EMB 202 Ipanema (cropduster)

==== Former ====
- Embraer EMB 121 Xingu (general utility)
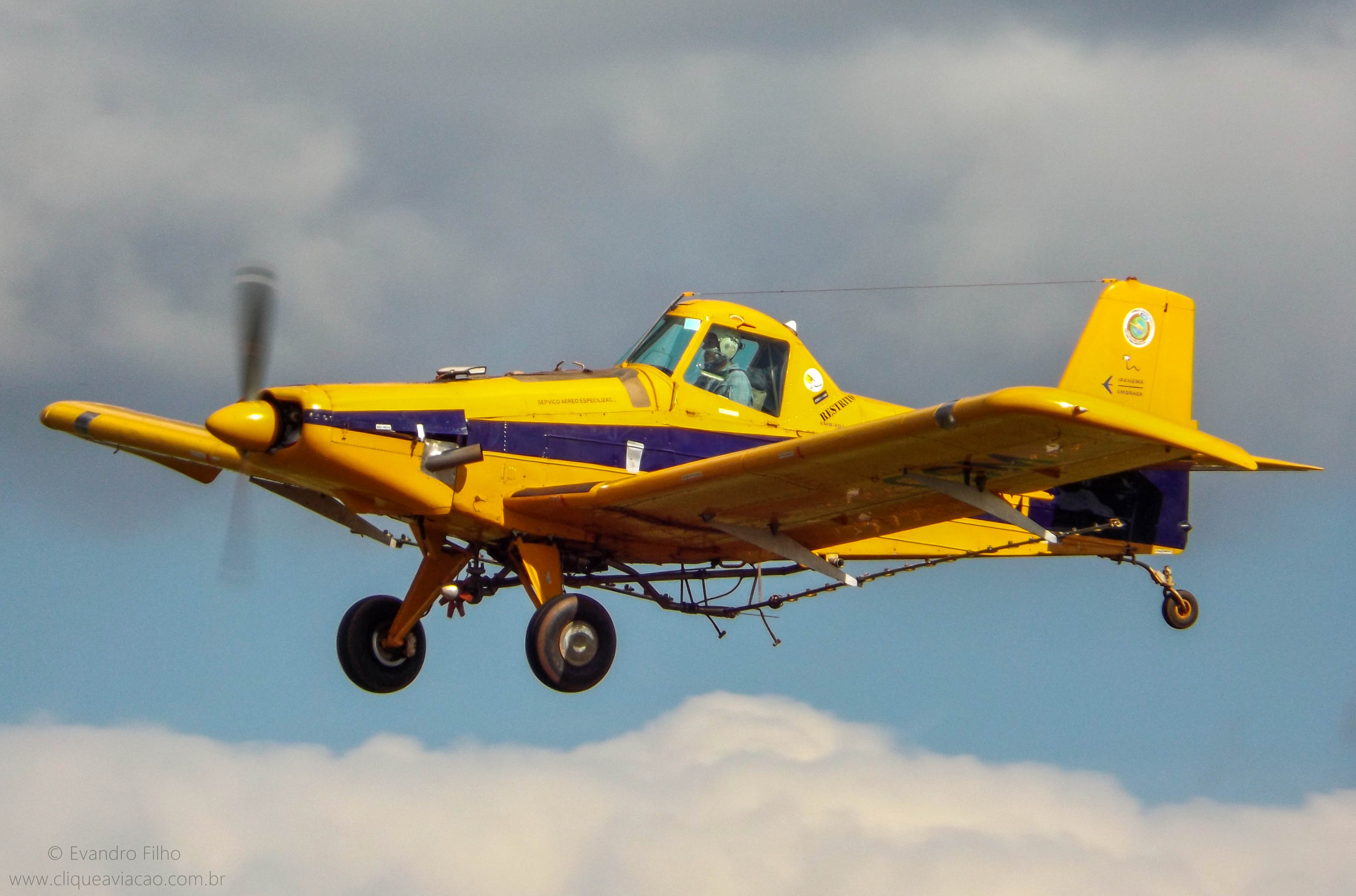
Embraer EMB 202 Ipanema

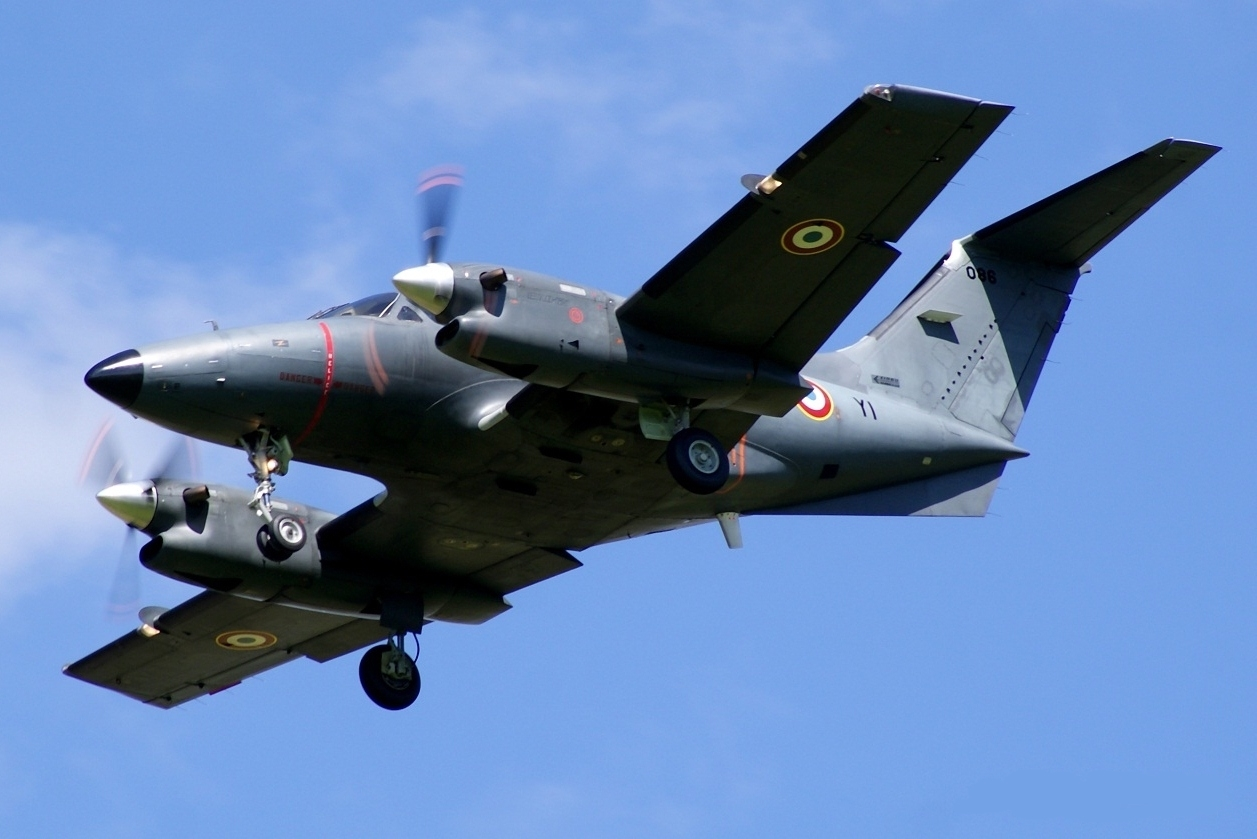
Embraer EMB 121 Xingu

=== Piper localizations ===
==== Current ====
- Embraer Seneca (based on Piper PA-34)
- Embraer Corisco/Tupi (based on Piper PA-28 Archer II)

==== Former ====
- Embraer Carioca/Minuano/Sertanejo (based on Piper PA-32)
- Embraer Navajo (based on Piper PA-31)

== Deliveries ==
Year							1996	1997	1998	1999
Deliveries							4	32	60	96
Year	2000	2001	2002	2003	2004	2005	2006	2007	2008	2009
Deliveries	160	161	131	101	148	141	130	169	204	244
Year	2010	2011	2012	2013	2014	2015	2016	2017	2018	2019
Deliveries	246	204	205	209	208	221	225	210	181	192
Year	2020	2021	2022	2023	2024	2025	2026	2027	2028	2029
Deliveries	130	141	159	181	206	244	–	–	–	–

The numbers include military versions of commercial aircraft.

Total delivered-backlog-options as of June 30, 2007: 862-53-131 145 Family, 256-399-719 170/190 Family

Net deliveries (by year)
As of 5 May 2026

== See also ==
- Defense industry of Brazil
