= Aerotec =

Aerotec may refer to:

- Aerotec S/A Indústria Aeronáutica, former Brazilian aircraft manufacturer
- Aerotec S.A., former name of Colombian aircraft manufacturer AeroAndina
- Premium AEROTEC, German company, manufacturing subsidiary of Airbus
