= Embraer Short Take Off Utility Transport =

Light military transport aircraft concept

- Short Take Off Utility Transport (STOUT) concept

General information
- Type: military transport aircraft
- Manufacturer: Embraer
- Status: Prototype

The Short Take Off Utility Transport (STOUT) is a light military transport aircraft concept proposed by Embraer.

== Development ==
In December 2019, Embraer and the Brazilian Air Force tackled the development of a light military transport aircraft. Renderings of a proposed hybrid electric aircraft with STOL capabilities were shown in November 2020. The Short Take Off Utility Transport (STOUT) would replace its 64 EMB-110 Bandeirante (average age of 38.3 years) and 19 EMB-120 Brasilia (average age of 26.5 years) with similar dimensions. Powered by two turboprops also generating power for electric-driven propellers on wingtips, it would serve remote, unpaved 1,200 m (3,940 ft) runways and have a 1,310 nm (2,425 km) range. It could carry ULD pallets for a maximum payload of 3 t (6,600 lb) loaded with a rear cargo ramp, or 24 paratroopers or 30 soldiers; or serve as an air ambulance.

It would have a T-tail and a fuselage comparable to the 65-ft. 7-in. (20-m) long EMB 120 but wider. Only concept studies are funded, a development program could follow after 2027 and commercial applications could include island hopping.

== See also ==
Aircraft of comparable role, configuration, and era

- CASA C-212 Aviocar
- Cessna 408 SkyCourier
- Indonesian Aerospace N-219
- PZL M28 Skytruck

Related lists

- List of military transport aircraft
