= Embraer next-generation turboprop =

Regional airliner prototype

Next-generation turboprop
- Updated configuration with aft engines, released in August 2021.

General information
- Type: regional airliner
- Manufacturer: Embraer
- Status: Prototype

History
- Introduction date: cancelled
- Developed from: Embraer E-Jet

The Next-generation turboprop is a regional airliner concept proposed by Embraer, powered by turboprop engines.

== Development ==
By May 2019, Embraer was considering developing a new family of turboprop regional airliners in the 50–70 seat range, complementing the E-Jet E2, so as to free engineering resources. By July 2020, it had evolved into the 70–100 passenger range In October 2020, Embraer released conceptual depictions of the 75–90 seat airliner, with a fuselage similar to the E-Jet and turboprops above a low wing but a different T-tail design. It would compete against older ATR and Dash 8 designs for 1.5 to 2 h flights over 500–700 nmi (930–1,300 km).

In August 2021, Embraer released a new configuration with quieter aft-mounted engines for a 70-90 seat aircraft, with the E-Jet cross-section, aiming for a 2022 launch and a 2027/2028 service entry. Over a 250 nmi (460 km) sector, a 74-seat TPNG 70 would burn 5% less fuel than a 70-seat ATR-72 and 13% less than the 80-seat Dash 8-400; while the 90-seat TPNG would save 18% per seat compared with the ATR, and 25% compared with the Dash. Embraer forecasts a market for 2,260 turboprops in the two decades following 2022.

Embraer CEO Francisco Gomes Neto announced during an earnings call in November 2025 that the turboprop project had been canceled as the company looked to focus on the development of its E175-E2 jet and other projects.

== See also ==
Related development

- Embraer E-Jet family

Aircraft of comparable role, configuration, and era

- ATR 72
- De Havilland Canada Dash 8

Related lists

- List of regional airliners
