= Aerotec A-122 Uirapuru =

A-122 Uirapuru
- T-23A Uirapuru.

General information
- Type: Primary Trainer
- National origin: Brazil
- Manufacturer: Aerotec S/A Indústria Aeronáutica
- Number built: 155

History
- Manufactured: 1968–1977
- First flight: 2 June 1965
- Developed into: Aerotec A-132 Tangará

The Aerotec A-122 Uirapuru was a Brazilian military trainer aircraft. It was a low-wing monoplane with tricycle undercarriage that accommodated the pilot and instructor side-by-side. It first flew on 2 June 1965.

== Design and development ==
In October 1967, the Brazilian Air Force ordered 30 aircraft to replace the obsolete Fokker S.11s and S.12s (T-21s and T-22s) that were operating in the Air Force Academy. Later, they ordered another 40, and then 30 more. These were designated T-23.

The Bolivian Air Force ordered 36 examples in 1974, which flew until 1997, and in 1975 the Paraguayan Air Force bought eight aircraft to replace the Fokker T-21 (S.11). In 1986, six more were donated by the FAB. Most of them were withdrawn from service in 1992, replaced by the Enaer T-35 Pillán. As of 2009, only one T-23 is in flying conditions. Thirty others were sold in the civilian market.

A total of 155 were built including prototypes by the time production finished in 1977.

The T-23 suffered fatal accidents during spin training. The problem was solved after a crash in which an instructor described his stricken aircraft's responses to his control inputs all the way to the end. Uirapurus then received a ventral fin under the rear fuselage to correct the issue.

In 1980 interest by the airforce in an improved version led to the development of the Uirapuru II, later known as the A-132 Tangará.

== Variants ==
- A-122A Uirapuru – T-23 – Military trainer
- A-122B Uirapuru – Civil version
- A-122C Uirapuru – T-23C
- A-132 Uirapuru II – enlarged version with improved canopy and larger vertical tail surfaces.

== Operators ==
Bolivia

- Bolivian Air Force – 18 A-122A purchased in 1974.

Brazil

- Brazilian Air Force

Paraguay

- Paraguayan Air Force – 14 aircraft (8 in 1975 and 6 in 1986)
- Escuela Nacional de Aeronáutica Civil – 1 aircraft (early 70s)

== Specifications (T-23) ==
A-122A(Military) A-122C(civil)

Data from Jane's All The World's Aircraft 1971–72

General characteristics

- Crew: 2
- Length: 6.60 m (21 ft 8 in)
- Wingspan: 8.50 m (27 ft 11 in)
- Height: 2.70 m (8 ft 10 in)
- Wing area: 13.50 m^{2} (145.3 sq ft)
- Aspect ratio: 5.33:1
- Airfoil: NACA 43013
- Empty weight: 540 kg (1,190 lb)
- Max takeoff weight: 840 kg (1,852 lb)
- Fuel capacity: 140 L (37 US gal; 31 imp gal)
- Powerplant: 1 × Lycoming O-320-B2B 4-cylinder horizontally-opposed air-cooled engine, 120 kW (160 hp)
- Propellers: 2-bladed Sensenich M-76-DM-60 fixed-pitch metal propeller, 1.87 m (6 ft 2 in) diameter

Performance

- Maximum speed: 225 km/h (140 mph, 121 kn)
- Cruise speed: 185 km/h (115 mph, 100 kn) at 1,500 m (4,900 ft) (max cruise)
- Stall speed: 88 km/h (55 mph, 48 kn) (flaps down)
- Never exceed speed: 337 km/h (209 mph, 182 kn)
- Range: 800 km (500 mi, 430 nmi)
- Endurance: 4 hr
- Service ceiling: 4,500 m (14,800 ft)
- Rate of climb: 4 m/s (790 ft/min)
- Takeoff run: 200 m (660 ft)
- Landing run: 180 m (590 ft)

== See also ==
Related development

- Aerotec A-132 Tangará
- Galeão 8 FG Guanabara
