= Aerotec S/A Indústria Aeronáutica =

Airplane manufacturer in the Brazil

- Company type: Public
- Industry: Aerospace
- Founded: 1962; 64 years ago
- Defunct: 1987; 39 years ago
- Fate: Acquired by Embraer
- Headquarters: São José dos Campos, São Paulo (state), Brazil
- Products: Aircraft

Aerotec S/A Indústria Aeronáutica was a Brazilian aircraft manufacturer founded in 1962 with the support of the Department of Science and Aerospace Technology (Portuguese: Departamento de Ciência e Tecnologia Aeroespacial; DCTA) in São José dos Campos.

== History ==
Beginning in the late 1960s, the company produced a two-seat trainer aircraft for the Brazilian Air Force, the Aerotec A.122 Uirapuru. Thirty units were produced for the civilian market. The Uirapuru was also exported to Bolivia and Paraguay.

Thereafter, Aerotec produced mainly components for Embraer until 1980. At that time, the Brazilian Air Force showed interest in a performance-enhanced version of the Uirapuru. A prototype with an improved cockpit canopy and enlarged tail unit was built as the A.132 Uirapuru II. Since the Brazilian Air Force did not order this aircraft, only a few examples were produced for Bolivia.

In 1987, the company was acquired by Embraer.

== Aircraft ==
Summary of aircraft built by Aerotec
Model name	First flight	Number built	Type
Aerotec A-122 Uirapuru	1965	155	Low-wing trainer aircraft
Aerotec A-132 Tangará	1981	7	Two-seat trainer Aircraft

== See also ==
- Companhia Aeronáutica Paulista
- Indústria Aeronáutica Neiva
