= Aerotec A-132 Tangará =

A-132 Tangará

General information
- Type: Primary trainer
- National origin: Brazil
- Manufacturer: Aerotec S/A Indústria Aeronáutica
- Primary user: Bolivian Air Force
- Number built: 7

History
- First flight: 26 February 1981
- Developed from: Aerotec A-122 Uirapuru

The Aerotec A-132 Tangará (originally the Uirapuru II) was a Brazilian military trainer aircraft developed from the A-122 Uirapuru of the 1960s.

== Design and development ==
The A-132 Tangará was developed in response to a request from the Brazilian Air Force. Compared to its predecessor, the Uirapuru II had a longer fuselage, greater wingspan, larger fin, more powerful engine, and a redesigned, flat-sided fuselage. A similar aircraft with a less powerful engine was planned for the civil market. The prototype first flew on 26 February 1981.

The Air Force originally had the intention to order 100 units but after a decision that the primary trainer should have tandem seats, the project was abandoned. The only orders came from the Bolivian Air Force, which ordered 6 units in 1986 and flew them until 1992. The prototype was given to the Air Force Technical Institute in 1990 where it was used for tests until 2004. It was then passed on to the Aeroclube de Sao Jose dos Campos, where it was flying with experimental restrictions, with a 200 hp (150 kW) engine from a Socata ST-10 Diplomate.

== Variants ==
- A-132A – Military trainer
- A-132B – Civil version (planned)
- T-17 – Brazilian Air Force designation of the A-132. Originally designated T-23B.

== Operators ==
Bolivia

- Bolivian Air Force

== Specifications (prototype) ==
Data from Jane's All The World's Aircraft 1982–83

General characteristics

- Crew: 2
- Length: 7.085 m (23 ft 3 in)
- Wingspan: 9.00 m (29 ft 6 in)
- Height: 2.70 m (8 ft 10 in)
- Wing area: 13.77 m^{2} (148.2 sq ft)
- Aspect ratio: 5.88:1
- Airfoil: NACA 2415
- Empty weight: 560 kg (1,235 lb)
- Max takeoff weight: 860 kg (1,896 lb)
- Powerplant: 1 × Lycoming O-320-B2B air-cooled flat-four, 119 kW (160 hp)
- Propellers: single blade Sensenich M-74-DM-6-060 two-blade fixed pitch, 1.87 m (6 ft 1.5 in) diameter

Performance

- Maximum speed: 238 km/h (148 mph, 129 kn) at sea level
- Cruise speed: 174 km/h (108 mph, 94 kn) at 60% power
- Stall speed: 72 km/h (45 mph, 39 kn) flaps down
- Endurance: 4 hr 18 min
- Service ceiling: 4,500 m (14,800 ft)
- Rate of climb: 4.60 m/s (905 ft/min)

== Background ==
The Tangará grew out of the Aerotec A-122 Uirapuru, the side-by-side primary trainer that Aerotec had developed in the 1960s for the Brazilian Air Force and which was designated T-23 in service. In 1979 the Air Force asked Aerotec to modernize the T-23, which led to the improved Uirapuru II, later renamed A-132 Tangará.

== See also ==
Related development

- Aerotec A-122 Uirapuru
