= List of aircraft of the Romanian Air Force =

This is a list of Romanian Air Force and Romanian Air Corps aircraft, those types in service since its formation in 1913, and also those types that are currently in service. The aircraft are listed in alphabetic or chronological order.

== Active ==
Model	Origin	Type	Number	Details
Alenia C-27J	Italy	Transport	7	In service since 2010
Antonov An-30	USSR	Surveillance/aerial cartography	2	Upgraded model
Antonov An-26	USSR	Transport	1	
Iak-52 W/TW	Romania	Trainer	14	Westernised versions
IAR 99 Standard/Șoim	Romania	Advanced trainer/light attack	10 IAR 99 Standard 11 IAR 99 Șoim	Standard variant to be modernized to the SM variant
IAR 316B	Romania	Trainer helicopter	7	
IAR 330L/M	Romania	Utility helicopter/transport helicopter	35	
IAR 330 SOCAT	Romania	Helicopter gunship	22	Converted IAR 330L helicopters
Lockheed C-130B/H	US	Transport	4 C-130B 5 C-130H	First aircraft received in 1996
General Dynamics F-16 AM/BM MLU	US	Multirole aircraft Conversion trainer	65 F-16AM/BM	Ex-Portuguese, ex-Norwegian and ex-Dutch fighters

=== NATO programmes ===
Model	Origin	Type	Number	Details
Boeing C-17 Globemaster III	US	Strategic airlift	3	Shared within NATO's Strategic Airlift Capability programme.
Northrop Grumman RQ-4 Global Hawk	US	Reconnaissance UAV	5	Shared within NATO's Alliance Ground Surveillance programme.

== Beginnings & World War I ==
Model	Origin	Type	Total number	Details
A Vlaicu I	Romania	Monoplane	1	In service 1910–1914
A Vlaicu II	Romania	Monoplane	1	Crashed in 1913
A Vlaicu III	Romania	Monoplane	1	Captured by Germany in 1916
Albatros B.I	Germany	Reconnaissance	1	Purchased in 1913, retired in 1917
Aviatik C.I	Germany	Reconnaissance	1	Purchased in 1916, retired in 1917
Blériot XI	France	Monoplane trainer	~28	Retired in 1919
Blériot XXI	France	Reconnaissance/trainer	1	Retired in 1916
Bristol B.R.7	UK	Biplane trainer	1	Purchased in 1913
Bristol Coanda Monoplane	UK	Monoplane trainer	13	Retired in 1917
Bristol TB.8	UK	Biplane trainer/Bomber	10	Retired in 1917; One equipped as a bomber
Bréguet 4	France	Bomber	12	In service 1916–1918
Bréguet 5	France	Bomber/escort fighter	20	In service 1916–1921
Bréguet 14	France	Bomber	86-150	Received from 1919, retired in 1929
Caudron G.3	France	Reconnaissance	12(?)	In service 1916–1920
Caudron G.4	France	Bomber	20	Received in 1917
Farman III	France/Romania	Biplane trainer	6	Built by Cerchez & Co.
Farman F.40	France	Reconnaissance/bomber	103 F.40 Type 42 17 F.40 Type 60	In service 1916–1920
Farman HF.20	France	Reconnaissance/bomber	4	In service 1914–1916
Farman HF.27	France	Reconnaissance/bomber	3	Ex-RNAS aircraft In service 1916–1919
Farman MF.7	France	Reconnaissance/bomber	6	In service 1915–1918
Farman MF.11	France	Reconnaissance/bomber	6	In service 1915–1918
Nieuport IV	France	Trainer	1(?)	In service 1912–1914
Nieuport 10	France	Trainer	1	In service 1915–1918
Nieuport 11	France	Fighter	18+	In service 1916–1923
Nieuport 12	France	Fighter/artillery spotter	5	Received in 1916 - retired
Nieuport 17, 23	France	Fighter	30 N.17 15+ N.23	In service 1917–1923
Nieuport 21	France	Fighter	10+	In service 1916–1923
Nieuport 24bis	France	Fighter	12	In service 1917–1923
Morane-Saulnier Type L	France	Parasol reconnaissance	6	In service 1915–1919
Rumpler Taube	Germany	Monoplane trainer	1	In service 1913–1920
Sopwith Pup	UK	Fighter	?	retired
Sopwith 1½ Strutter	UK/France	Multirole biplane	72	In service 1917–1924
SPAD VII	France	Fighter	39(?)	One received in 1919, others in 1920; used into the late 1920s
Voisin III, V	France	Bomber/reconnaissance	8	In service 1915–1919

=== Captive balloons ===
Type	Origin	Number	Details
Caquot	France	19+	900 m^{3} (32,000 cu ft) capacity kite balloon
Drachen	Germany	4	630 m^{3} (22,000 cu ft) capacity kite balloon

=== Captured ===
Model	Origin	Type	Total Number	Details
Aviatik (Berg) D.I	Austria-Hungary	Fighter	16	Captured from Hungary in 1919; Retired in 1923
Fokker D.VI	Germany	Fighter	6	Captured from Hungary in 1919; Retired in 1925
Fokker D.VII	Austria-Hungary	Fighter	34	Captured from Hungary in 1919; Retired in 1926
Hansa-Brandenburg C.I	Austria-Hungary	Reconnaissance	22+	Captured from Hungary in 1919; Unknown number captured during World War I Used until 1923
LVG C.VI	Germany	Reconnaissance	11	Captured from Hungary in 1919; Retired in 1923
Phönix C.I	Austria-Hungary	Reconnaissance	4	Captured from Hungary in 1919; Retired in 1934
Ufag C.I	Austria-Hungary	Reconnaissance	20	Captured from Hungary in 1919
Zeppelin-Staaken R.XIVa	Germany	Heavy bomber	1	Number R.70/18 seized in 1919; Retired in 1926

== Interwar period ==
Date	Model	Origin	Type	Total number	Details
1920	SPAD XIII	France	Fighter	21(?)	Retired in 1926
1921	Airco DH.9	UK	Bomber	10	Retired in 1926
1921	Nieuport 81	France	Trainer	10	Retired in 1923
1922	Hansa-Brandenburg C.I	Romania	Reconnaissance/trainer	120	Built by Arsenalul Aeronautic; Retired in 1930
1924	Hanriot HD.14	France	Trainer	15	Retired in 1930
1924	Proto 2	Romania	Trainer	25	Retired in 1930
1924	Potez XV	France	Reconnaissance/bomber	120	Retired in 1939
1924	Morane-Saulnier 35	France/Romania	Trainer	42	Retired in 1935
1925	Blériot-SPAD S.61	France	Fighter	100	Retired in 1935
1926	Fokker D.XI	Netherlands	Fighter	49	Retired in 1938
1926	Rabo	Romania	Trainer	1	Retired in 1930
1927	Caudron C.59	France	Multi-purpose aircraft	20	Retired in 1937
1927	Morane-Saulnier MS.43	France	Trainer	5	Retired in 1930
1927	Morane-Saulnier MS.129	France	Trainer	10	Retired in 1935
1927	Nieuport-Delage NiD 42	France	Fighter	1	Damaged and withdrawn from service in 1928
1928	Bréguet 19	France	Light bomber/reconnaissance	110	Retired in 1939
1928	Farman F.168 Goliath	France	Bomber/transport	4	Retired in 1934
1928	Gourdou-Leseurre GL.32	France	Trainer	62	Retired in 1941
1928	Lioré et Olivier LeO 20BN.3	France	Night bomber	7	Retired in 1940
1928	Potez 25/25.36/25.40	France/Romania	Reconnaissance/bomber	260 Potez 25 3 Potez 25.36 3 Potez 25.40	Last aircraft retired in 1948
1929	Dewoitine D.27	France	Fighter	3	Retired in 1935
1929	Nieuport-Delage NiD 72	France	Fighter	3	Retired in 1935
1930	Morane-Saulnier MS.230	France	Trainer	16	Retired in 1937
1930	SET 3	Romania	Trainer	10	Retired in 1938
1930	SET 31	Romania	Trainer	20	Retired in 1943
1930	SET 7	Romania	Trainer	50	Retired in 1943
1931	SET 4	Romania	Trainer	30	Retired in 1943
1931	Fokker D.XVI	Netherlands	Fighter	1	Retired in 1938
1932	de Havilland DH.60 Moth	UK	Trainer	3	Retired in 1938
1932	SET 41	Romania	Trainer	10	Retired in 1939
1933	PZL P.11b	Poland	Fighter	50	Retired after 1948
1934	SET XV	Romania	Fighter	1	Used for aerobatic training Retired in 1940 after an accident
1934	Consolidated Fleet 10G	US/Romania	Trainer	< 430	Retired after 1948; one on display at the Military Museum in Bucharest
1934	IAR 12	Romania	Fighter	1	Retired in 1935
1934	IAR 14	Romania	Fighter	21	Retired in 1940
1934	IAR 15	Romania	Fighter	1	Crashed in 1938
1934	IAR 16	Romania	Fighter	1	Retired in 1940
1934	IAR 22	Romania	Trainer	2	Retired in 1935
1934	SET 7K	Romania	Trainer/reconnaissance	60	Retired after 1948
1935	Potez 543	France	Bomber	10	Retired in 1945
1935	ICAR Acrobatic	Romania	Trainer	2	Retired in 1943
1936	Caudron C.600 Aiglon	France	Trainer	6	Retired in 1947
1936	IAR 27	Romania	Trainer	80(?)	Retired after 1948
1936	Klemm Kl 25	Germany	Trainer	59	Retired after 1948
1936	Klemm Kl 35D	Germany	Trainer	80	Retired after 1948
1936	Miles M.2 Hawk Trainer	UK	Trainer	12	Retired after 1948
1936	Miles Nighthawk	UK	Trainer	2	Retired in 1945
1937	Focke-Wulf Fw 44C	Germany	Trainer	8	Retired in 1946
1937	Focke-Wulf Fw 58B-2/C-2	Germany	Transport/Trainer	34	Retired after 1948
1937	PZL P.11f	Poland/Romania	Fighter	95	Retired in 1948
1937	PZL P.24E	Poland/Romania	Fighter	30	Retired in 1948
1937	General Aircraft Monospar ST-25	UK	Utility	2	Retired in 1941
1938	Bloch MB.210 BN.5	France	Medium bomber	10	Retired in 1946
1938	IAR 37	Romania	Reconnaissance/light bomber	50	Retired after 1948
1938	IAR 38	Romania	Reconnaissance/light bomber	75	Retired after 1948
1938	Potez 651	France	Transport	4	Retired in 1944

== World War II ==
Model	Origin	Type	Total number	Details
Avia B.122	Czechoslovakia	Trainer	6	Purchased in 1939, retired after 1948
Bristol Blenheim Mk.I	UK	Bomber	40	In service 1939–1948
Bücker Bü 131	Germany	Trainer	20	Purchased in 1939, retired after 1948
Bücker Bü 133	Germany	Trainer	10	Purchased in 1940, retired after 1948
DFS 230	Germany	Troop glider	27	In service 1942–1947
DFS Kranich	Germany	Glider	14	In service 1943–1946; Sold to civilian associations
Dornier Do 17M	Germany	Reconnaissance/bomber	10	In service 1942–1946
Fieseler Fi 156C-2/C-3/D-1	Germany/Romania	Reconnaissance/liaison aircraft	112	74 built by ICAR; Retired after 1948
Focke-Wulf Fw 189A-2	Germany	Reconnaissance	2	In service 1943–1945
Gotha Go 145	Germany	Trainer	15	In service from 1939, retired after 1948
Gotha Go 150	Germany	Trainer	1	Requisitioned in 1941, retired after 1948
Gotha Go 242A-1	Germany	Transport glider	5	Ordered in 1944
Hawker Hurricane Mk. I	UK	Fighter	15	In service 1939–1945
Heinkel He 111E/H	Germany	Bomber	10 He 111E 42 He 111H	In service from 1939, retired after 1948
Heinkel He 112B-1/B-2	Germany	Fighter	30	Purchased in 1939, retired in 1948
Henschel Hs 129B-2	Germany	Attack	40+	In service 1943–1949
IAR 39A/B	Romania	Reconnaissance/light bomber	255	In service from 1941, retired after 1948
IAR 47	Romania	Reconnaissance	1	In service from 1941, retired after 1948
IAR JIS-79B, JRS-79B/B-1	Italy/Romania	Medium bomber	8 JIS-79B 48 JRS-79B 38 JRS-79B-1	In service from 1939, retired after 1948
IAR 80A/B/C	Romania	Fighter	50 IAR 80 85 IAR 80A 55 IAR 80B 60 IAR 80C	Retired by 1949
IAR 81/-81C	Romania	Dive bomber/fighter	50 IAR 81 150 IAR 81C	Retired by 1949
Junkers W 34hi	Germany	Transport	10	In service 1944–1945; Transferred to civilian aviation
Junkers Ju 52-3m	Germany	Transport	35	
Junkers Ju 86E	Germany	Reconnaissance	12	In service 1944–1948
Junkers Ju 87D-3/D-5	Germany	Dive bomber	90+	In service from 1943, retired after 1948
Junkers Ju 88A-4/A-12/D-1/D-2	Germany	Bomber/reconnaissance	69+ Ju 88A 19+ Ju 88D	In service from 1943, retired after 1948
Messerschmitt Bf 108B	Germany	Transport/liaison aircraft	22	In service from 1940, retired after 1948
Messerschmitt Bf 109E/F/G	Germany	Fighter	69 Bf 109E 7 Bf 109F 200+ Bf 109G	124 Bf 109G assembled by IAR; Retired in 1955
Messerschmitt Bf 110C/E/F	Germany	Night fighter/heavy fighter	12 Bf 110C 2 Bf 110E 9 Bf 110F	In service from 1943, retired after 1948
Nardi FN.305	Italy/Romania	Trainer	176	146 built by SET; retired
Polikarpov U-2	USSR	Utility biplane	2	Received as gifts in 1945
Potez 631 & 633	France	Reconnaissance/bomber	53(?)	In service 1939–1948
Savoia-Marchetti SM.79B	Italy	Bomber	24	In service 1939–1946

=== Interned ===
The list includes all airplanes that arrived from Slovakia (following the Slovak–Hungarian War) and Poland in 1939.

Model	Origin	Type	Details
Fokker F.VIIb/3m	Netherlands	Airliner	4 airplanes 2 assigned to LARES retired
Junkers Ju 52-3m	Germany	Transport	1 airplane from Poland; Assigned to LARES
Letov Š-328	Czechoslovakia	Reconnaissance	1 airplane from Slovakia; Retired in 1941
Lublin R-XIIID	Poland	Trainer/air ambulance	27 airplanes Retired in 1948
Potez 62	France	Airliner	1 airplane Assigned to LARES
PWS-24	Poland	Airliner	1 airplane Crashed in 1940
PWS-26	Poland	Trainer	46 airplanes Retired in 1946
PZL.5	Poland	Trainer	1 airplane Retired in 1940
PZL P.7a	Poland	Fighter	14 airplanes retired
PZL P.11a/c	Poland	Fighter	10 P.11a 7 P.11b 35 P.11c All retired in 1948
PZL.23 Karaś	Poland	Light bomber	20 airplanes Retired in 1948
PZL.37 Łoś A/B	Poland	Medium bomber	30 airplanes Retired in 1944
RWD-8	Poland	Trainer	44 airplanes Retired after 1948
RWD-13	Poland	Liaison/air ambulance	34 airplanes Retired in 1947
RWD-14 Czapla	Poland	Trainer/liaison	21 airplanes Retired in 1948
RWD-15	Poland	Transport	2 airplanes Retired in 1944
RWD-17	Poland	Trainer	8 airplanes Retired in 1946
RWD-21	Poland	Trainer	2 airplanes Retired in 1947
Douglas DC-2	US	Airliner	1 airplane Destroyed in 1944
Lockheed Model 10 Electra	US	Airliner	5 airplanes Assigned to LARES
Lockheed Model 14 Super Electra	US	Airliner	4 airplanes Assigned to LARES

=== Captured ===
Model	Origin	Type	Details
Arado Ar 66C	Germany	Trainer	One captured in 1944
Consolidated B-24D Liberator	US	Heavy bomber	Three bombers recovered in 1943, one was repaired and used for fighter pilot training then was handed over to the LARES. It was destroyed on the ground during a German raid on 26 August 1944.
Focke-Wulf Fw 190A-8/F-8	Germany	Fighter/Fighter-bomber	39 FW 190s captured in 1944, only 13 put into service. Nine serviceable FW 190s were later confiscated by the Soviet Union.
Heinkel He 111H-20	Germany	Bomber	One captured in 1944; Unknown civilian user operated registration YR-PTP
North American P-51 Mustang	US	Fighter	Possibly one P-51D captured in 1944, fate unknown
Polikarpov U-2VS (Po-2)	USSR	Utility biplane	One captured in 1944
Polikarpov I-16 Type 24	USSR	Fighter	One I-16 captured near Dorohoi in 1941.
Mikoyan-Gurevich MiG-3	USSR	Fighter	Captured near Melitopol on 18 March 1942 when the pilot defected. It was flown to IAR Brașov by Constantin Cantacuzino on 13 July 1942 and used as an opposition trainer until being taken by the Soviet Union in 1944.

== Post War period & Cold War ==
Date	Model	Origin	Type	Total number	Details
1946	Lisunov Li-2P	USSR	Transport	15	Nine planes transferred from TAROM
1948	Polikarpov Po-2	USSR	Utility biplane	46	most received in 1949
1948	Yakovlev UT-2	USSR	Trainer	?	retired
1948	Zlin 181	Czechoslovakia	Trainer	?	
1949	Yakovlev Yak-11	USSR	Trainer	49	Retired by 1962
1950	Lavochkin La-9	USSR	Fighter	10	10 delivered in 1950; one on display at the Military Museum in Bucharest
1950	Ilyushin Il-10	USSR	Attack	168	received in 1950, 1952 & 1953; used through 1960; one displayed at Aviation Museum in Bucharest
1950	Tupolev Tu-2	USSR	Medium bomber	6	delivered in 1950
1950	IAR 811	Romania	Trainer	1	Developed into the IAR 813
1951	Yakovlev Yak-17UTI	Trainer	USSR	9	Retired in 1956
1951	Yakovlev Yak-18	USSR	Trainer	17	Retired
1951	Yakovlev Yak-23	USSR	Fighter	62	Two converted to the Yak-23DC twin-seat variant Received in 1951, retired in 1960
1952	Mikoyan-Gurevich MiG-15	USSR	Fighter	~514	159 MiG-15, 50 MiG-15bis, 204 S-103, 59 MiG-15UTI, and 42 CS-102; A few are on display at the Military Museum and the Aviation Museum in Bucharest
1953	Aero 45	Czechoslovakia	Liaison	5	
1953	IAR 813	Romania	Trainer	50	remained in use until at least 1955; 24 civilian aircraft were transferred to air-ambulance duties in 1961
1953	IAR 814	Romania	Trainer	10(?)	
1954	Antonov An-2	USSR/Poland	Utility biplane	10+	Retired by 2010
1955	Ilyushin Il-14P/M	USSR	Transport	30 Il-14P 3 Il-14M	Retired by 1983
1955	Ilyushin Il-28	USSR/China	Medium bomber	11 Il-28 16 Harbin H-5	Retired in 1972 Retired by 2001
1955	Mikoyan MiG-17PF	USSR	Fighter	12	Retired in the 1990s
1956	Mil Mi-4	USSR	Helicopter	10	
1956	Mikoyan MiG-17F	USSR	Fighter	12	Retired in the 1990s
1958	Mikoyan MiG-19P/PM	USSR	Fighter	17 MiG-19P 10 MiG-19PM	Retired in 1972
1959	PZL SM-1	Poland	Helicopter	6	Retired in 1974
1962	PZL SM-2	Poland	Helicopter	5	Retired in 1974
1962	Mikoyan MiG-21F-13	USSR	Fighter	24	Delivered in 1962-1963; Retired in 1976
1965	Antonov An-24RT	USSR	Transport	10	Retired in 2007
1965	Aero L-29	Czechoslovakia	Trainer	52	Retired in 2005
1965	Mikoyan MiG-21RFM	USSR	Interceptor	38	Delivered in 1965; Designation for the MiG-21PF
1965	Mikoyan MiG-21DC	USSR	Trainer	4 MiG-21U-400 3 MiG-21U-600	Delivered in 1965–1968; Designation for MiG-21U Izdeliye 66-400/600.
1966	Ilyushin Il-18D	USSR	VIP transport	3	Transferred to Romavia
1966	Mikoyan MiG-21RFMM	USSR	Interceptor	56	Delivered in 1966–1968; Designation for the MiG-21PFM
1968	BAC 1-11	UK	VIP transport	2	Retired
1968	Mil Mi-8	USSR	Helicopter	25 Mi-8T 14 Mi-8PS	Some transferred to MAI service, retired in 2022
1968	Mikoyan MiG-21C	USSR	Fighter	12	Delivered in 1968–1972 - designation for the MiG-21R; Retired in the 1990s
1969	Mikoyan MiG-21M	USSR	Fighter	73	Delivery starting in 1969–1970; 34 converted to LanceR A (ground attack) in 1995-2002
1969	Mikoyan MiG-21US	USSR	Trainer	14	Delivered starting in 1969–1970
1970	Aérospatiale Alouette II	France	Helicopter	2	Acquired in 1970; YR-ALB (76) at the Romanian National Aviation Museum
1970	Mil Mi-17	USSR	Helicopter	3	Some transferred to MAI service, retired in 2022
1971	IAR 316B	Romania	Helicopter	120	Still in service
1972	Mikoyan MiG-21UM	USSR	Trainer	17	Delivered starting in 1972–1980; Double seat variant of the MiG-21MF; 5 received in 1990; 14 converted to LanceR B (trainer) in 1995-2002
1974	Antonov An-26A	USSR	Transport	11	One still in service as of 2023
1974	IAR 823	Romania	Trainer/liaison	56(?)	operated until the late 1990s; Most surviving airframes sold to private owners in the USA
1974	B.707-3K1C	US	VIP transport	2	Transferred to Romavia, then retired from airline passenger use in 2013; civilian service ended in 2019
1975	IAR 330H/L	Romania	Helicopter	15 IAR 330H 112 IAR 330L	Still in service
1975	Mikoyan MiG-21MF/MF-75	USSR	Fighter	74	Delivered in 1972–1975; 37 converted to LanceR A (ground attack) & 26 converted to LanceR C (air superiority) in 1995-2002
1976	Antonov An-30	USSR	Transport	3	Operated from 1976; currently two still in use as of 2017
1977	Britten-Norman BN-2 Islander	UK/Romania	Transport	6+	Built by Romaero
1977	Iak-52	Romania	Trainer	?	Built by Aerostar; Still in service
1977	Ilyushin Il-62M	USSR	VIP transport	1	
1979	Aérospatiale SA 365 Dauphin C	France	VIP transport helicopter	4	Retired in 1986
1979	Mikoyan-Gurevich MiG-23MF/UB	USSR	Fighter	36 MiG-23MF 10 MiG-23UB	Retired in 2003
1979	IAR-93A/DC	Romania	Ground attack	26 IAR-93A 9 IAR-93DC	Retired by 1998
1981	Aero L-39ZA	Czechoslovakia	Trainer	32	Retired in 2007
1982	IAR-93MB	Romania	Ground attack	15	Retired by 1998
1982	IAR-825	Romania	Trainer	1	Sold in 2006
1984	IAR-28MA	Romania	Motor glider	10	received in 1984
1986	Aérospatiale SA 365 Dauphin N	France	VIP transport helicopter	4	Still in service with SRI
1987	IAR-93B/DC	Romania	Ground attack	27 IAR-93B 7 IAR-93B-DC	Retired by 1998
1987	VR-3	USSR	Unmanned aerial vehicle	12	Retired in 2002
1987	IAR 99 Standard	Romania	Trainer/light attack	21	Still in service
1989	Mikoyan MiG-29A/S/UB	USSR	Multirole fighter	17 MiG-29A 1 MiG-29S 5 MiG-29UB	MiG-29S received from Moldova in 1992; Retired in 2004

== Post-1990 ==
Date	Model	Origin	Type	Total number	Details
1997	MiG-21 LanceR	USSR/Romania	Ground attack (LanceR A) Trainer (LanceR B) Air superiority fighter (LanceR C)	71 LanceR A 14 LanceR B 26 LanceR C	Modernized variant of the MiG-21M and MF/MF-75; Retired in 2023
1998	Shadow 600	US	Unmanned aerial vehicle	11	11 initially, starting in 1998; 4 crashed (1 in country, 3 in Iraq)

== See also ==
- Romanian Naval Aviation
- Romavia
- List of equipment of the Romanian Armed Forces/Army aircraft
