= Industria Aeronautică Română =

Romanian aerospace company

- Industry: Aerospace
- Founded: 1925; 1968, re-established
- Headquarters: Brașov, Romania
- Key people: Elie Carafoli; Radu Manicatide; Iosif Șilimon
- Website: www.iar.ro

Industria Aeronautică Română (IAR) (now IAR S.A. Brașov), or Romanian Aeronautic Industry in English, is a Romanian aerospace manufacturer. It is based in Ghimbav, near Brașov-Ghimbav International Airport, Romania.

IAR was founded in 1925 with the aid of the Romanian government, which sought to reduce reliance on foreign companies to supply the Royal Romanian Air Force with aircraft and associated equipment. In addition to its designs, the company built numerous foreign-designed aircraft under license as well. IAR produced a low-wing all-metal monoplane, the IAR 80, during the Second World War; this combat aircraft was extensively used by the nation during the conflict. During the Cold War era, the company branched out into helicopters, securing licensing agreements with France for their designs in the field, leading to the IAR 316 and IAR 330. In 2000, IAR partnered with the multinational helicopter manufacturer Eurocopter Group to create the Eurocopter Romania joint venture company. Presently, the company employs around 1,200 specialists including more than 170 engineers; it carries out upgrades, revisions, and overhauls on helicopters and light aircraft.

== History ==
=== Origins and early years ===
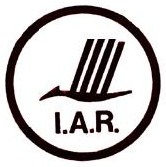
Old IAR logo

To ensure that the Royal Romanian Air Force (the Aeronautica Regală Română, or ARR) would be supplied with aircraft without reliance on foreign producers, the Romanian government subsidized the creation of three major aircraft manufacturers in the interbellum period. The first was Societatea pentru Exploatări Tehnice (SET) which was founded in Bucharest in 1923. Next came IAR, which was formed in Brașov since 1925. Finally there was Întreprinderea de Construcții Aeronautice Românești (ICAR), which was created in Bucharest in 1932, and operated a factory in Brașov known as ICA-Brașov (Întreprinderea de Construcții Aeronautice - Brașov).

One of the engineers designing IAR aircraft in the early 1930s was Elie Carafoli. During 1930, IAR's first original aircraft, the IAR CV 11, performed its maiden flight; it functioned as an experimental design only. One of its earliest aircraft to reach quantity production was the IAR 14, a trainer aircraft derived from the IAR 12 prototype. The IAR 27 was a more advanced trainer that was introduced in larger quantities during the late 1930s.

In addition to pursuing its own designs, IAR also pursued work via the licensed production of foreign-developed aircraft. Poland's innovative PZL P.11 fighter captured the attention of Romanian officials, leading to a batch of 95 aircraft, referred to as the P.11f, being built by IAR starting in 1936. The Romanian Air Force was greatly appreciative of the type, which heavily contributed to the decision to also licensed produce its upgraded derivative, the PZL P.24, which had been designed exclusively for the export market. Both models would see combat service during the Second World War.

IAR worked throughout the conflict to produce large numbers of combat aircraft to equip the Romanian military. Perhaps one of the most significant aircraft to be produced by the company was built during these years in the form of the IAR 80, a low-wing monoplane all-metal monocoque fighter and ground-attack aircraft. When it first flew in 1939, the IAR 80 was claimed to be comparable to contemporary designs being deployed by the most advanced military powers, including the British Hawker Hurricane and the German Messerschmitt Bf 109E. An improved model, the IAR 81 fighter aircraft, was designed and produced mid-way through the war as well. The type remained in frontline use until May 1945, when the conflict was brought to an end.

=== Cold War era ===
After World War II, starting from 1946, the production of IAR was oriented towards the manufacture of tractors. The first tractor produced being the IAR 22.

Between 1945 and 1947, under the coordination of Radu Manicatide and Radu Mărdărescu, IAR developed a microcar, named M.R., and an automobile. However, the company did not persist with road vehicle development in the long term. From 1947, IAR became the Intreprinderea Metalurgica de Stat (State Ironworks) and from 1948, the company was renamed to Uzina Tractorul Brașov (UTB).

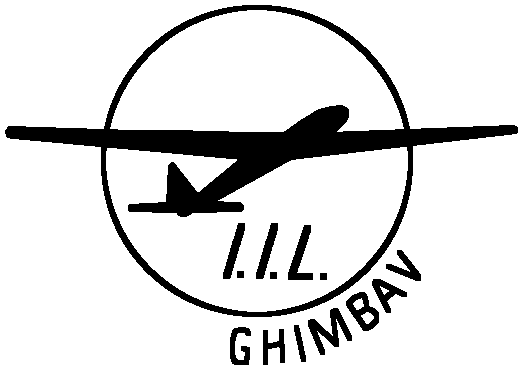
Logo of IIL

The current IAR was re-established in 1968 at Ghimbav, under the name Intreprinderea de Construcţii Aeronautice (ICA). The ICA developed from the former Intreprinderea de Industrie Locală (IIL) glider manufacturer. During this time, the company began to produce helicopters, motor gliders and airplanes, besides gliders. Romania arranged multiple licensing agreements with France, resulting in IAR producing Aérospatiale's SA 316B Alouette III under the local designation of IAR 316. The company also manufactured a localised version of the Aérospatiale SA 330 Puma, designated IAR 330. These rotorcraft were not only manufactured for domestic consumption, such as the Romanian Air Force, but also for the global market; roughly one-third of all IAR 330s were reportedly sold to export customers. During the late 1980s, a Soviet-Romanian partnership led to the development of the Kamov Ka-126 helicopter; only a handful were built before production was terminated shortly following the Romanian Revolution and the collapse of the Communist government.

Since 1968, IAR has produced more than 360 helicopters, along with 830 gliders and including motor gliders, as well as 136 light aircraft.

=== Twenty-first century ===
During the late 1990s, American aerospace company Bell Helicopters entered negotiations on the topic of acquiring a majority stake in IAR. According to aerospace periodical Flight International, Bell was at one stage set to purchase a 70 percent shareholding in the firm; this arrangement was closely tied to a planned procurement of the AH-1RO Dracula attack helicopter by Romania, which would have been manufactured locally by IAR. However, by 1998, the purchase was put on hold while efforts were made to raise funds for the AH-1RO purchase. Following a period of negotiations, in November 1999, Bell announced that it had abandoned its intentions to take over IAR and to locally produce the AH-1RO.

During 2000, it was announced that the multinational helicopter manufacturer Eurocopter Group was holding discussions over its own bid for IAR. Later that same year, IAR established Eurocopter Romania in conjunction with Eurocopter, the former held a 49% stake in the newly created joint venture. In November 2015, Airbus Helicopters announced plans to invest €52 million in a Romanian facility to manufacture the 8.6t H215M Super Puma; this arrangement was reportedly reliant upon an initial order for 16 being placed by the Romanian government to extend the type's production.

== Products ==
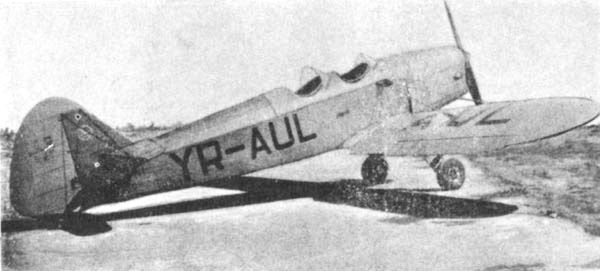
IAR 27

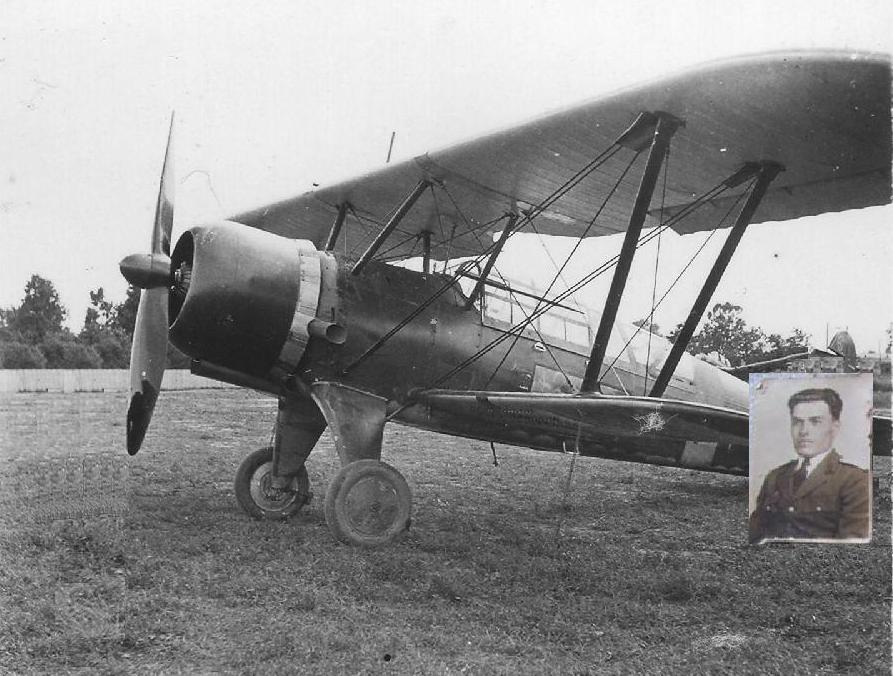
IAR 37

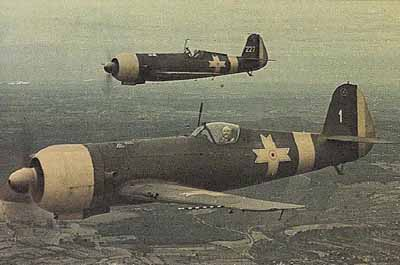
IAR 80

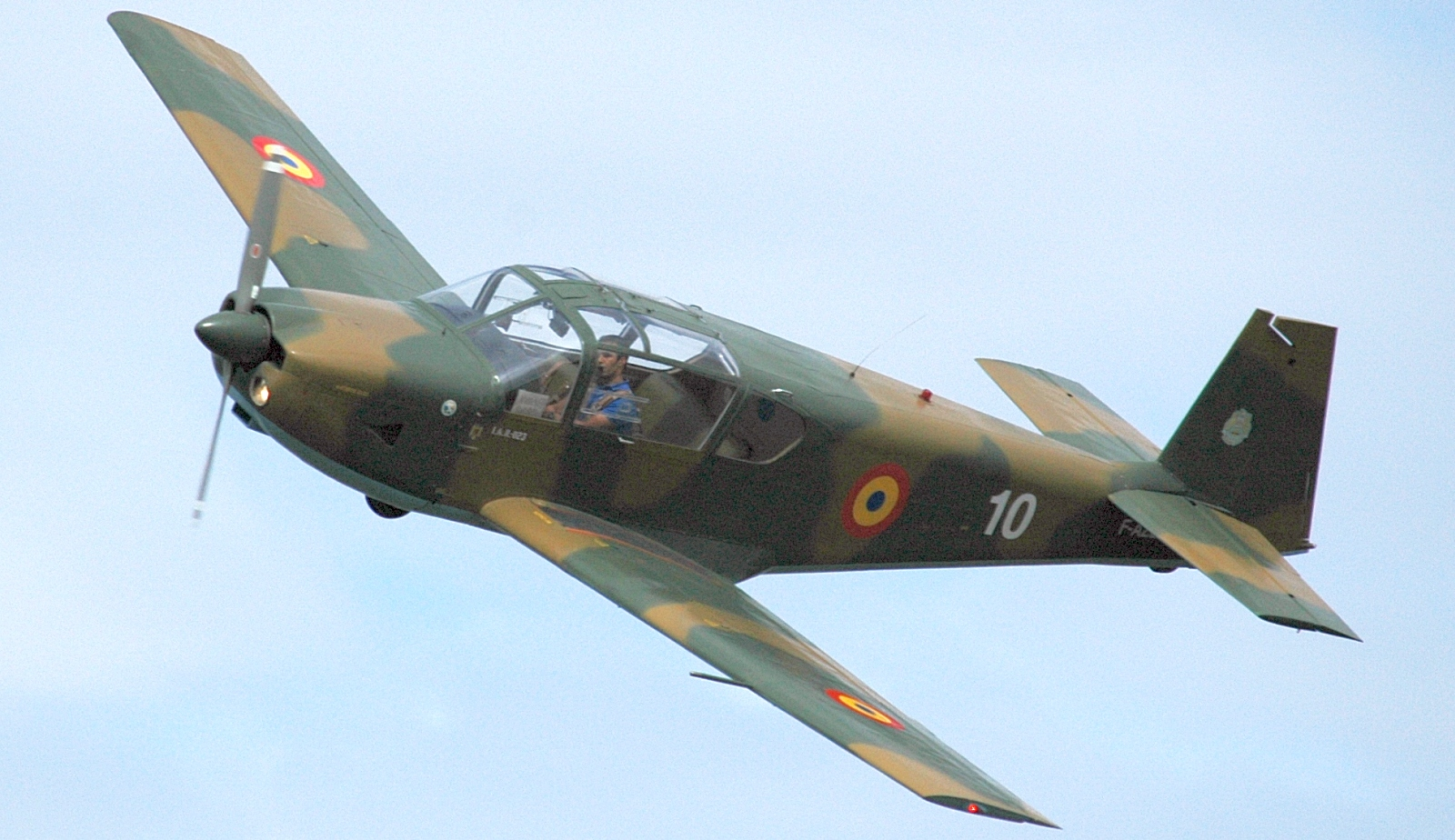
IAR 823

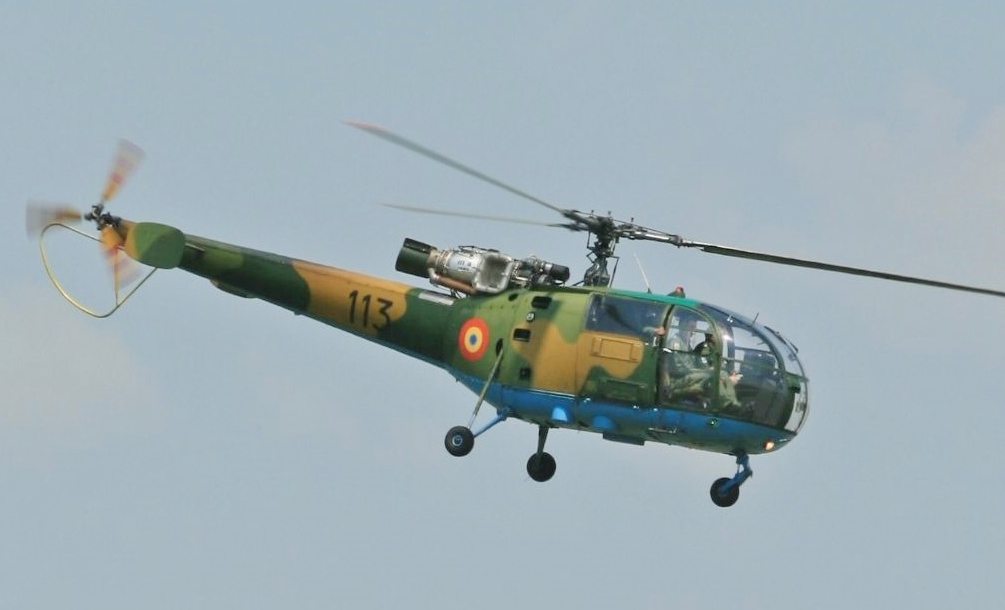
IAR 316

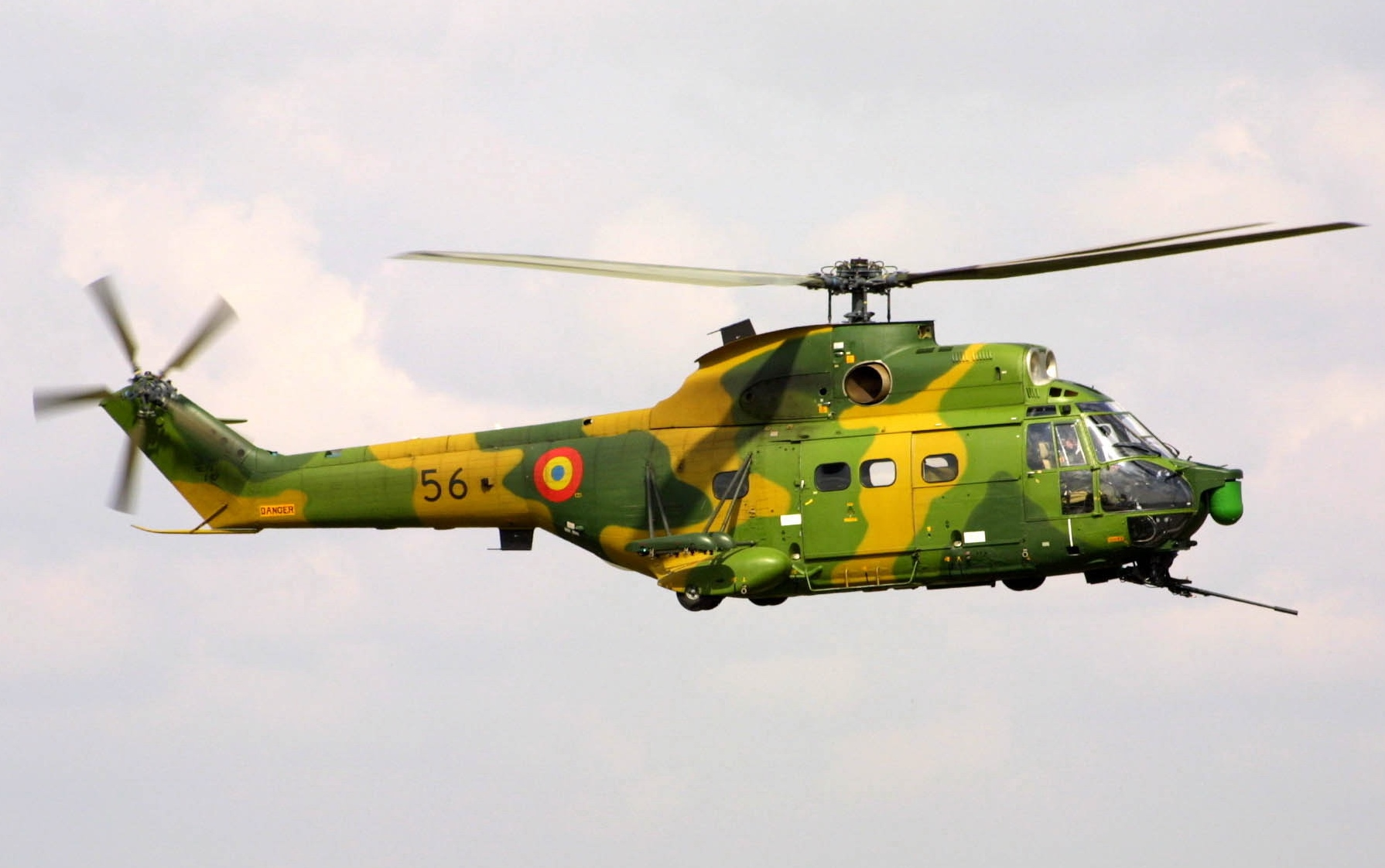
IAR 330 SOCAT

Model name	First flight	Number built	Type
IAR CV 11	1930	1	Single engine monoplane fighter
IAR 12	1933	1	Single engine monoplane fighter
IAR 13	1933	1	Single engine monoplane fighter
IAR 14	1933	21	Single engine monoplane fighter
IAR 15	1933	5	Single engine monoplane fighter
IAR 16	1934	1	Single engine monoplane fighter
IAR 21		1	Single engine monoplane trainer
IAR 22		2	Single engine monoplane trainer
IAR 23		1	Single engine monoplane touring airplane
IAR 24		1	Single engine monoplane touring airplane
IAR 27	1937	200+	Single engine monoplane trainer
IAR 37	1937	50	Single engine biplane light bomber
IAR 38	1937	75	Single engine biplane light bomber
IAR 39	1937	95 (Note: An additional 160 aircraft were built by SET.)	Single engine biplane light bomber
IAR 47	1942	2	Single engine monoplane light bomber
IAR 79	1937	72	Twin engine monoplane bomber
IAR 80	1939	250	Single engine monoplane fighter
IAR 81	1939	200	Single engine monoplane fighter/dive bomber
IAR 471	N/A	1	Single engine monoplane dive bomber
License Built Aircraft
Morane-Saulnier MS.35		30	License built single engine monoplane trainer
Potez 25		217	License built single engine biplane light bomber
IAR P.11F		95	License built single engine monoplane fighter
IAR P.24E		25	License built single engine monoplane fighter
Fleet 10G		95	License built single engine biplane trainer
Savoia-Marchetti SM.62		5	License built single engine monoplane flying boat patrol airplane
Assembled
Messerschmitt Bf 109G	1943	124 (Note: Some Bf 109Ga-6 were completed after the war. In total, 62 109Ga-6, converted from 109Ga-4 kits, 49 109Ga-2 and 13 109Ga-4.)	Single engine monoplane fighter
Postwar
IAR 811	1949	1	Single engine monoplane trainer
IAR 813	1950	80	Single engine monoplane trainer
IAR 814	1953	10	Twin engine monoplane transport
IAR 817	1955	60+	Single engine monoplane utility airplane
IAR 818	1960		Single engine monoplane utility airplane
IAR 821	1967	21	Single engine monoplane agricultural airplane
IAR 822	1970	30	Single engine monoplane agricultural airplane
IAR 823	1973	80	Single engine monoplane trainer
IAR 824	1971	10	Single engine monoplane utility airplane
IAR 825 Triumf	1982	1	Single engine monoplane trainer
IAR 826	1973	13	Single engine monoplane agricultural airplane
IAR 827	1976	17	Single engine monoplane agricultural airplane
IAR 831	1983	1	Single engine monoplane trainer
IAR 46	1993		Single engine monoplane touring airplane
Helicopters
IAR 316 Alouette III		250	Single engine utility helicopter
IAR 317 Airfox		1	Single engine attack helicopter
IAR 330 Puma	1975	>163	Twin engine utility helicopter
Kamov Ka-126	1988	17	Single engine utility helicopter
Gliders
ICA IS-3			Glider
ICA IS-4	1959		Glider
ICA IS-8	1960		Glider
ICA IS-10	1960		Glider
ICA IS-11	1959		Glider
ICA IS-12	1960	1	Glider
ICA IS-13	1960	1	Glider
ICA IS-23	1968		Single engine utility airplane
ICA IS-28	1970		Glider
ICA IS-28M			Motorglider
ICA IS-29	1970		Glider
ICA IS-30			Glider
ICA IS-31			Glider
ICA IS-32	1977		Glider
ICA IS-33			Glider
ICA IAR-35	1986	4+	Glider

== See also ==
- Aviation in Romania
- IAR 111
