= IAR-23 =

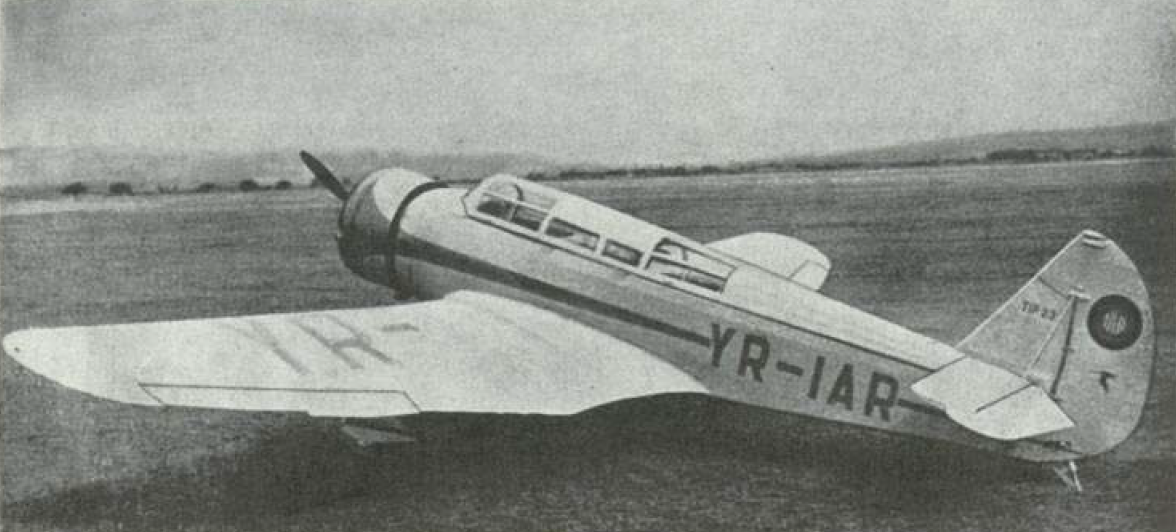

General information
- Type: Light multipurpose aircraft
- National origin: Romania
- Manufacturer: IAR
- Number built: 1

History
- First flight: 1934

The IAR-23 and IAR-24 were low-wing monoplane light multipurpose aircraft with a conventional undercarriage, built by IAR of Romania.

== Development ==
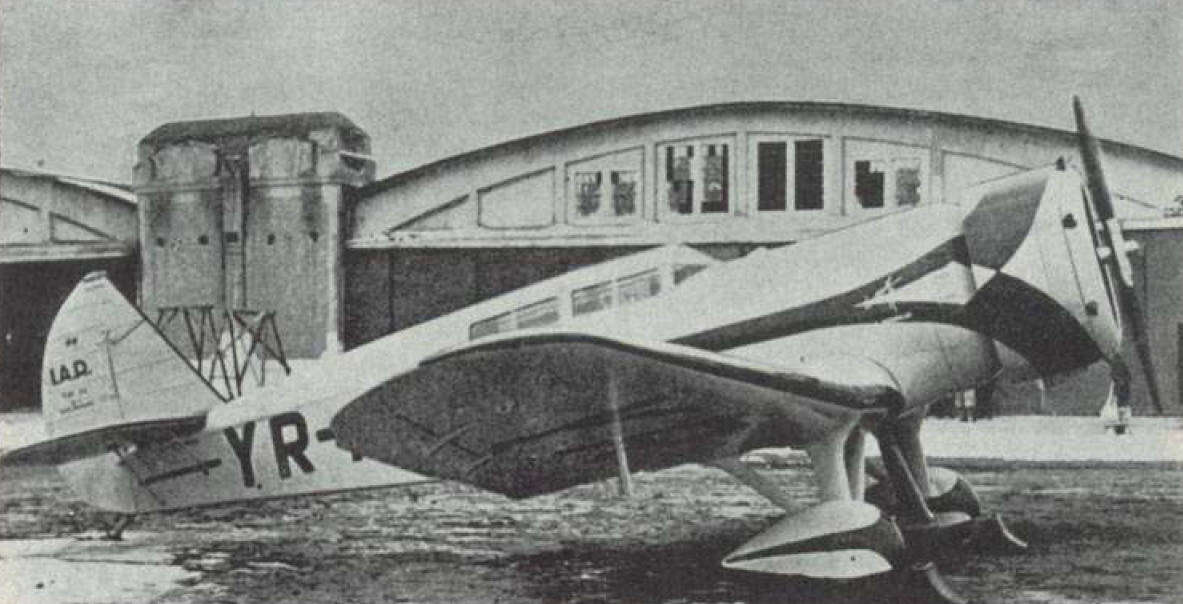
The IAR 24

The IAR-23 was created in 1934 by the Romanian company Industria Aeronautică Română (IAR) as an attempt to design a next-generation fighter for the Royal Romanian Air Force, but because its low power, it was classified only as a civilian touring aircraft. However, it contained many advanced features for its time, including uniquely designed wings. After the installation of additional fuel tanks, it turned into a long-haul touring plane, with a maximum range of 2300 km.

An improved version, the IAR-24, was created in 1935. It used the same airframe, but had a modernized cockpit and a slightly more powerful engine that yielded a higher cruising speed.

== Operators ==
The sole IAR-23 built was registered YR-IAR. and delivered to Major Gheorghe Bănciulescu in September 1934, who undertook several cross country flights with the aircraft through Europe (from Bucharest to Warsaw, Prague and Vienna). The next year, the IAR-23 was flown to Tel-Aviv and back.

The sole IAR-24 was registered YR-ACI. The fates of both aircraft are unknown.

== Specifications (IAR-23) ==
Data from I Gudju, G Iacobescu, O Ionescu: Romanian Aeronautical Constructions 1905-1974

General characteristics

- Crew: 2 pilots
- Capacity: 4 passengers
- Length: 8.35 m (27 ft 5 in)
- Wingspan: 12.00 m (39 ft 4 in)
- Height: 2.70 m (8 ft 10 in)
- Wing area: 22.30 m^{2} (240.00 sq ft)
- Empty weight: 980 kg (2,156 lb)
- Gross weight: 1,920 kg (4,224 lb)
- Powerplant: 1 × Hispano-Suiza 9Qa radial piston , 253 kW (340 hp)

Performance

- Maximum speed: 245 km/h (153 mph, 133 kn)
- Cruise speed: 215 km/h (134 mph, 116 kn)
- Range: 2,300 km (1,437 mi, 1,249 nmi)
- Service ceiling: 4,100 m (13,670 ft)

Aircraft of comparable role, configuration, and era

- LWD Szpak
- Aero A.200
- PZL.26
- Messerschmitt Bf 108
