= IAR-831 =

Romanian trainer aircraft

IAR 831

General information
- Type: Trainer aircraft
- National origin: Romania
- Manufacturer: Industria Aeronautică Română
- Status: Prototype only
- Number built: 1

History
- First flight: 1983
- Developed from: IAR-825

The IAR-831 Pelican is a Romanian trainer aircraft based on the IAR-825 built for the Romanian Air Force. One airframe was built, bearing the civil registration YR-IGA.

== Specifications (IAR-831) ==
Data from

General characteristics

- Crew: 2
- Length: 8.99 m (29 ft 6 in)
- Wingspan: 10 m (32 ft 10 in)
- Height: 3.2 m (10 ft 6 in)
- Wing area: 15 m^{2} (160 sq ft)
- Airfoil: NACA 23012 (modified)
- Empty weight: 1,250 kg (2,756 lb)
- Gross weight: 2,300 kg (5,071 lb)
- Powerplant: 1 × Lycoming IO-540 G1D5 6-cylinder horizontally-opposed air-cooled piston engine, 220 kW (290 hp)
- Propellers: 2-bladed variable-pitch propeller

Performance

- Maximum speed: 470 km/h (290 mph, 250 kn)
- Cruise speed: 440 km/h (270 mph, 240 kn)
- Stall speed: 105 km/h (65 mph, 57 kn)
- Never exceed speed: 550 km/h (340 mph, 300 kn)
- Range: 1,400 km (870 mi, 760 nmi)
- Service ceiling: 9,000 m (30,000 ft)
- Rate of climb: 16 m/s (3,100 ft/min)
