= IAR-16 =

Romanian fighter prototype

IAR 16
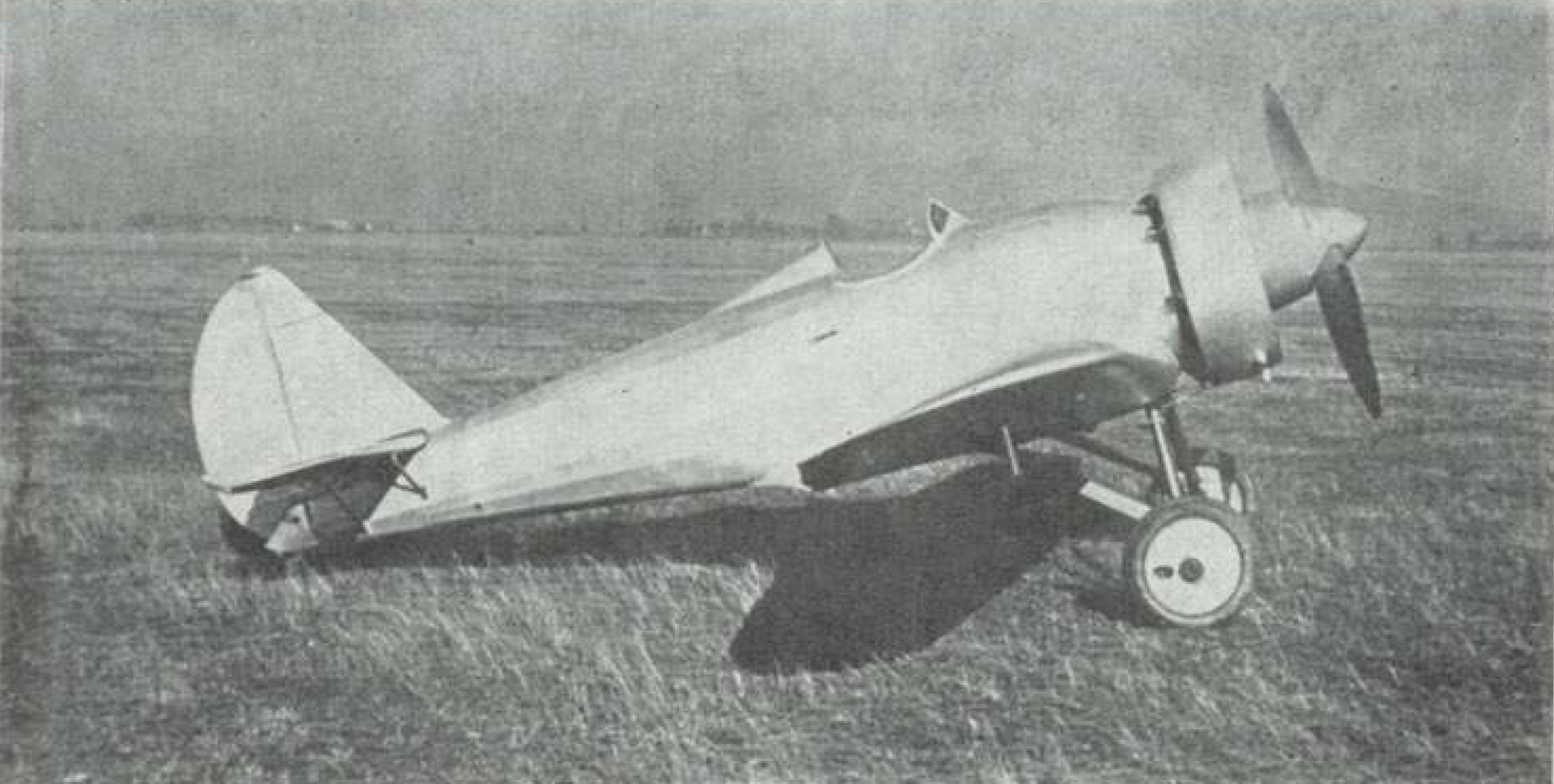

General information
- Type: Single-seat fighter
- National origin: Romania
- Manufacturer: Industria Aeronautică Română (IAR)
- Designer: Elie Carafoli
- Number built: 1

History
- First flight: 1934

The IAR 16 was a low-wing monoplane fighter designed in Romania in 1934.

== Development ==
Developed in parallel with the I.A.R. 15, the model '16' featured for the first time an all-metal airframe structure, covered with duralumin sheets, plywood and fabric. It resembled the I.A.R. 14 more closely than the I.A.R. 15, being inferior to the latter. The fuselage outlines followed the '14's, as did the wings, although their area was increased to 20.30 m^{2}. The tail section, as usual, was redesigned, the rear part this time becoming rounded. The two-strut undercarriage of the I.A.R. 14 was retained as well, and the tailskid appeared again. A new British radial engine, the Bristol Mercury IV S2, of maximum 560 h.p. (418 kW) output at 4,500 m, was experimented with. The powerplant was covered with a narrow Townend ring and individual exhaust pipes were fitted to each of the nine cylinders. The typical feature of this model was a large propeller cone fitted to a Bristol-made two-blade wooden airscrew. Due to the larger wings and all-metal fuselage structure the empty weight increased to 1,430 kg, giving a relatively high, 70.14 kg/m^{2} wing load, that increased further during flight, taking also into consideration that the all-up weight was 1,650 kg. The usual armament, comprising two 7.7 mm Vickers machine guns, featured on all early I.A.R. fighters, was employed, this time placed in the wings and firing outside the propeller arc. The British engine offered an impressive maximum speed of 342 km/h at 5,000 m that could be reached in 6 ½ minutes, while the ceiling was established at 10,000 m.

== Operational history ==
The I.A.R. 16, first flown in 1934, remained in prototype stage. Its only significant achievement was the improvement of Romania's national altitude record. Piloted by Locotenent aviator Papana, on 16 July 1935, the I.A.R. 16, featuring an enclosed cockpit, took off from Pipera airfield at 17.48 p.m. 47 minutes later it established a new altitude of 11,631 m (at that time, the world altitude record was held by the Italian Cdr. R. Donati, who reached 14,433 m on 11 April 1934, while flying a Caproni 161), beating the previous 10,518 m set up by the late Romeo Popescu. The prototype was still seen in 1935-1936 at various air shows, where Alex. Papana performed high-level aerobatics to the delight of the spectators.

== Operators ==
Romania

== Specifications ==
Data from

General characteristics

- Crew: one
- Length: 7.76 m (25 ft 5.5 in)
- Wingspan: 11.00 m (31 ft 6 in)
- Height: 2.7 m (8 ft 10 in)
- Wing area: 19.00 m^{2} (204 sq ft)
- Empty weight: 1,215 kg (2,673 lb)
- Gross weight: 1,650 kg (3,630 lb)
- Powerplant: 1 × Bristol MercuryIV S2, of maximum 560 h.p. (418 kW) output at 4,500 9-cylinder supercharged radial , 418 kW (540 hp)

Performance

- Maximum speed: 342 km/h (213 mph, 185 kn)
- Service ceiling: 10,500 m (34,400 ft)
- Rate of climb: 10.4 m/s (2,050 ft/min) to 5,000 m (16,400 ft)

Armament

- Two 7.7mm Vickers fixed machine guns firing through propeller

== Bibliography ==
- Cortet, Pierre (June 1976). "Les chasseurs I.A.R: à la mode "Jockey" des années 30, mais en Roumanie (2)" [The I.A.R Fighters: In the Jockey Style of the Thirties, but in Romania, Part 2]. Le Fana de l'Aviation (in French) (79): 10–13. ISSN 0757-4169.
- Cortet, Pierre (July 1976). "Les chasseurs I.A.R: à la mode "Jockey" des années 30, mais en Roumanie (3)" [The I.A.R Fighters: In the Jockey Style of the Thirties, but in Romania, Part 3]. Le Fana de l'Aviation (in French) (80): 28–33. ISSN 0757-4169.
- Grey, C.G. (1972). Jane's All the World's Aircraft 1938. London: David & Charles. ISBN 0-7153-5734-4.
