= IAR-817 =

IAR 817
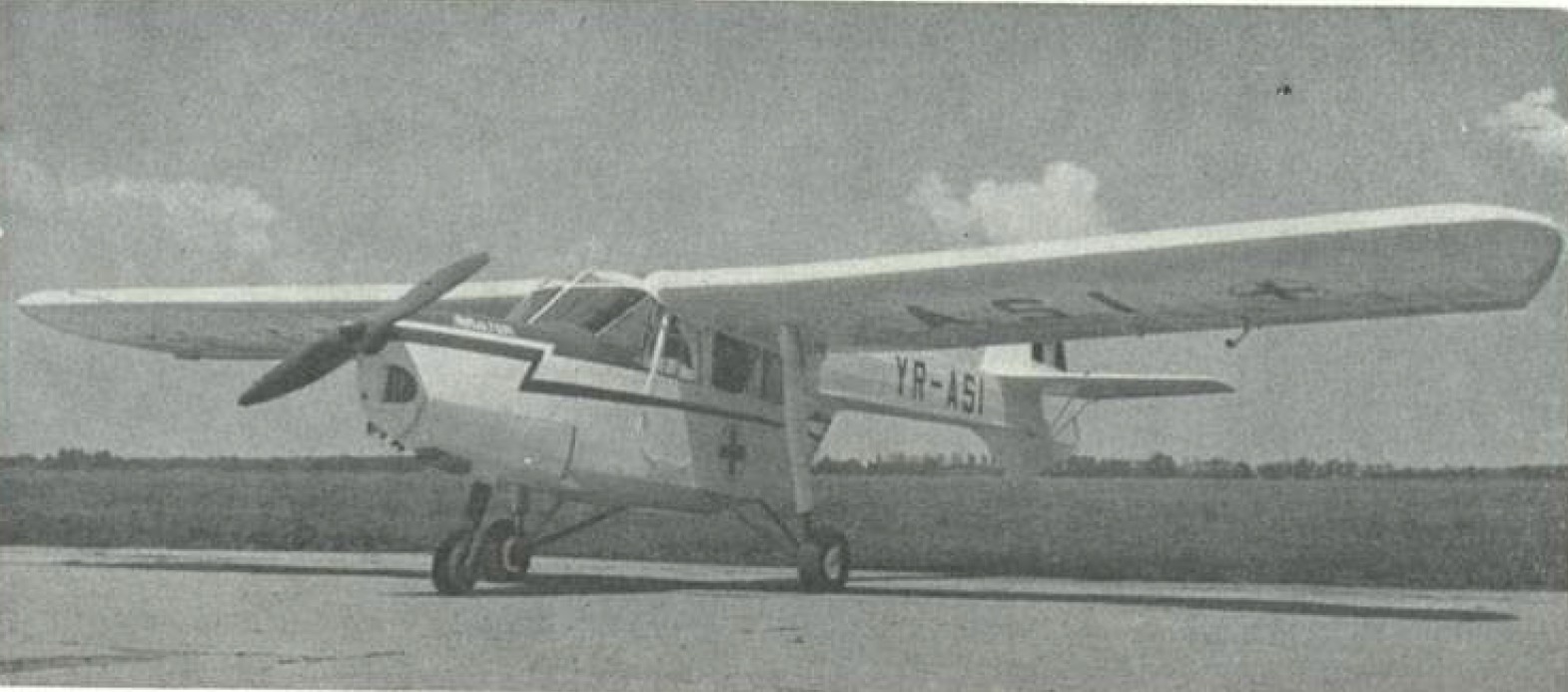

General information
- Type: Multipurpose aircraft
- National origin: Romania
- Manufacturer: Industria Aeronautică Română
- Number built: 60+

History
- First flight: 1955
- Variant: IAR-818

The IAR-817 was a Romanian multipurpose aircraft built in the 1950s.

== Design and construction ==
In 1955, a prototype of a new utility aircraft, the IAR-817, was first flown at the URMV-3 works at Brașov, Transylvania. The URMV-3 works had been formed at the Sovromtractor tractor factory, itself on the site of the Industria Aeronautică Română aircraft works. It was a single-engine high-wing monoplane with a pod-and-boom type fuselage of welded steel tube construction and fabric-covered wooden wings. It had a fixed tricycle undercarriage. The aircraft was powered by a single 120 kW (160 hp) Walter Minor 6-III air-cooled six-cylinder inverted inline engine.

An air-ambulance version of the IAR-817, the IAR-817S, entered production in 1957, with over 60 built. The type formed the basis of the IAR-818, built from 1961.

== Specifications ==
Data from Romanian Aeronautical Constructions 1905–1974

General characteristics

- Crew: 1 or 2
- Capacity: 4-5
- Length: 9.8 m (32 ft 2 in)
- Wingspan: 12.6 m (41 ft 4 in)
- Height: 3.4 m (11 ft 2 in)
- Wing area: 25.4 m^{2} (273 sq ft)
- Empty weight: 800 kg (1,764 lb)
- Max takeoff weight: 1,150 kg (2,535 lb)
- Powerplant: 1 × Walter Minor 6-III 6-cylinder inverted air-cooled in-line piston engine, 120 kW (160 hp)
- Propellers: 2-bladed variable-pitch propeller

Performance

- Maximum speed: 175 km/h (109 mph, 94 kn)
- Cruise speed: 165 km/h (103 mph, 89 kn)
- Stall speed: 70 km/h (43 mph, 38 kn)
- Range: 560 km (350 mi, 300 nmi)
- Ferry range: 930 km (580 mi, 500 nmi)
- Service ceiling: 3,000 m (9,800 ft)
- Time to altitude: 1,000 m (3,300 ft) in 7 minutes 30 seconds
- Take-off run: 150–180 m (490–590 ft)
- Landing run: 60 m (200 ft)
