= IAR-46 =

IAR 46
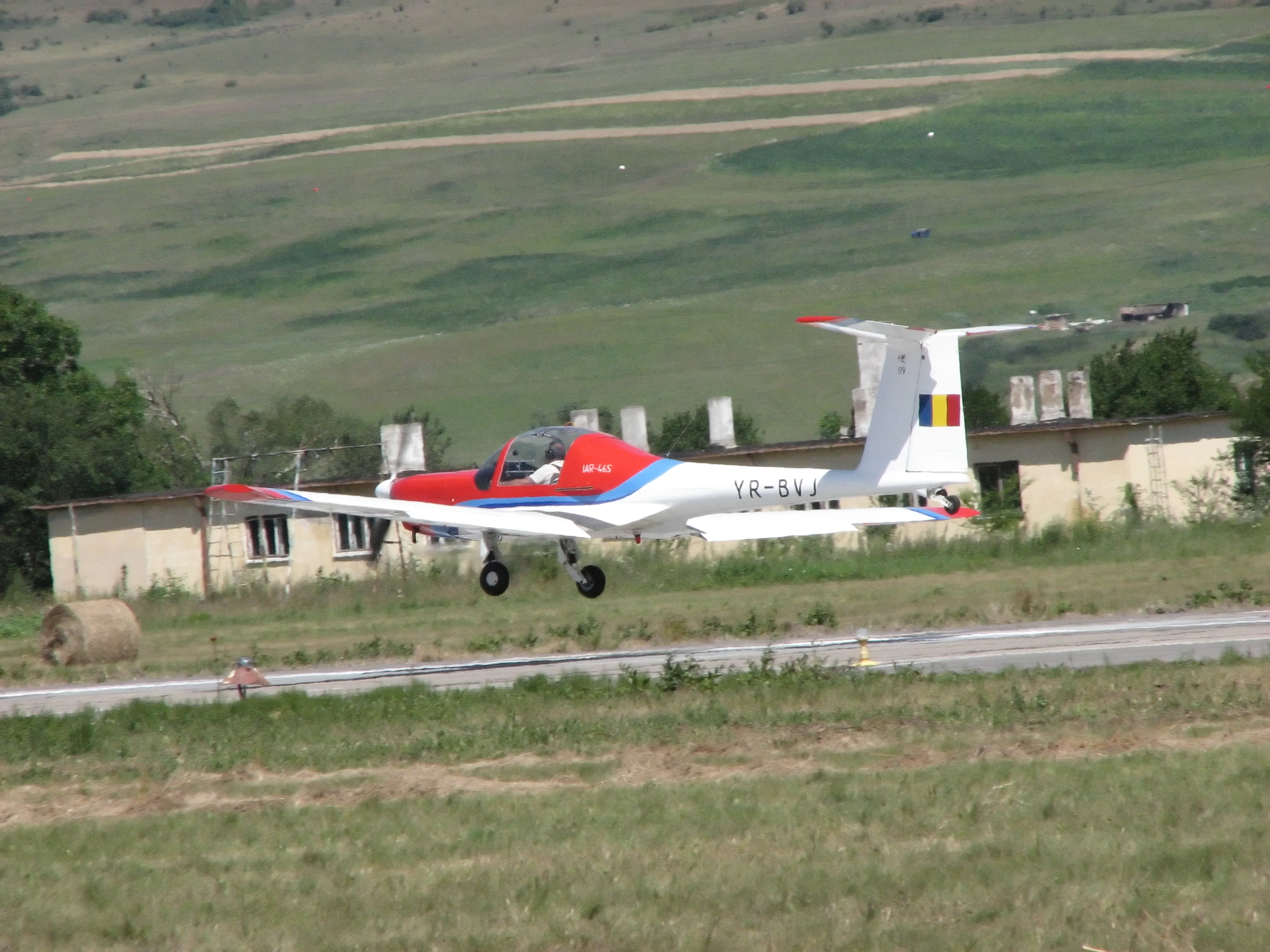

General information
- Type: Light aircraft
- National origin: Romania
- Manufacturer: IAR

History
- First flight: 1993
- Developed from: ICA IS-28

The IAR-46 is a very light two-seater airplane for flight schools, training and tourism. Construction uses conventional riveted joints. The seats are arranged side by side, the conventional left seat being the pilot or student pilot seat. The aircraft has a low trapezoidal wing, empennage in "T" configuration, semi-retractable landing gear (mechanical), with the tailwheel connected to the rudder.

The aircraft was certificated under JAR-VLA regulations by the Romanian Civil Aviation Authority in November 1999.

== Variants ==
IAR 46
baseline production version
IAR 46S
More powerful 73.5 kW (98.6 hp) Rotax 912 S3 engine

== Specifications (IAR.46) ==
Data from Brassey's World Aircraft & Systems Directory 1999/2000, Jane's all the World's Aircraft 2004-05.'

General characteristics

- Crew: two
- Length: 7.85 m (25 ft 9 in)
- Wingspan: 11.42 m (37 ft 6 in)
- Height: 2.15 m (7 ft 1 in)
- Wing area: 13.87 m^{2} (149.3 sq ft)
- Aspect ratio: 9.403:1
- Airfoil: GA(W)-1
- Empty weight: 530 kg (1,168 lb)
- Max takeoff weight: 750 kg (1,653 lb)
- Fuel capacity: 78 L (21 US gal; 17 imp gal)
- Powerplant: 1 × Rotax 912 F3/A3 4-cylinder horizontally-opposed air-cooled piston engine, 58 kW (78 hp)
- Propellers: 2-bladed Hoffmann HO-V352F/170FQ, 1.7 m (5 ft 7 in) diameter variable-pitch propeller

Performance

- Cruise speed: 150 km/h (93 mph, 81 kn) (econ cruise)
- Stall speed: 78 km/h (48 mph, 42 kn)
- Never exceed speed: 270 km/h (170 mph, 150 kn)
- Range: 800 km (500 mi, 430 nmi) (no reserve)
- Service ceiling: 5,000 m (16,000 ft)
- g limits: +4.4, -2.2
- Rate of climb: 4.30 m/s (846 ft/min)
- Wing loading: 54.1 kg/m^{2} (11.1 lb/sq ft)
- Power/mass: 12.58 kg/kW (20.67 lb/hp)
