= IAR-818 =

IAR 818
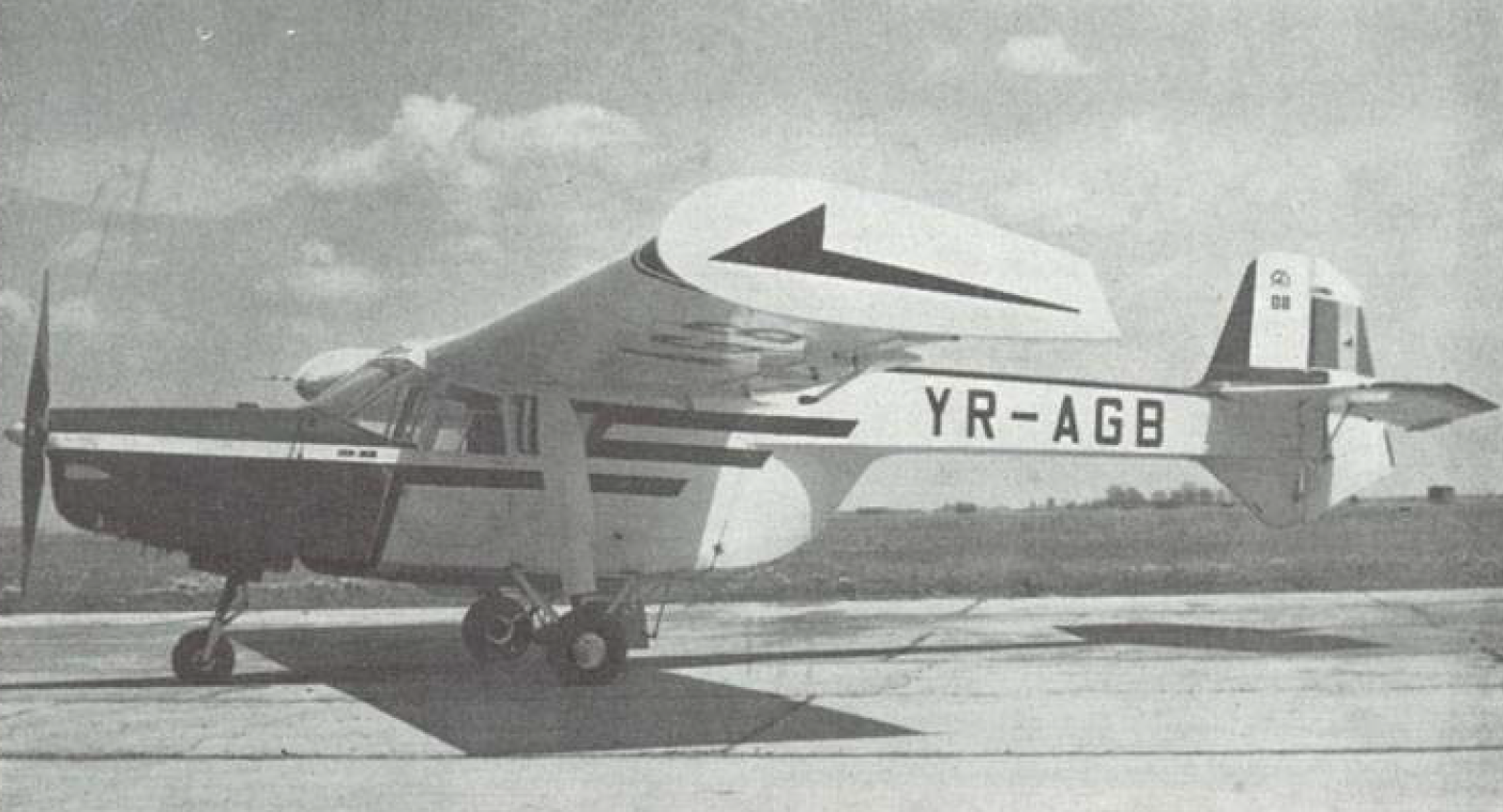

General information
- Type: Multipurpose aircraft
- National origin: Romania
- Manufacturer: Industria Aeronautică Română

History
- First flight: 1960
- Developed from: IAR-817

The IAR-818 was a Romanian multipurpose aircraft based on the IAR-817. It was developed by IAR in both landplane and floatplane forms.

== Variants ==
IAR-818
Landplane utility aircraft
IAR-818H
Floatplane with twin floats and added ventral fin

== Specifications ==
Data from Romanian Aeronautical Constructions 1905–1974

General characteristics

- Crew: 1 or 2
- Capacity: 5-6
- Length: 9.9 m (32 ft 6 in)
- Wingspan: 12.1 m (39 ft 8 in)
- Height: 3.3 m (10 ft 10 in)
- Wing area: 25.4 m^{2} (273 sq ft)
- Empty weight: 805 kg (1,775 lb)
- Gross weight: 1,180 kg (2,601 lb)
- Max takeoff weight: 1,300 kg (2,866 lb)
- Powerplant: 1 × Avia M-337 6-cylinder inverted air-cooled in-line piston engine, 155 kW (208 hp)
- Propellers: 2-bladed variable-pitch propeller

Performance

- Maximum speed: 185 km/h (115 mph, 100 kn)
- Cruise speed: 165 km/h (103 mph, 89 kn)
- Stall speed: 60 km/h (37 mph, 32 kn)
- Range: 500 km (310 mi, 270 nmi)
- Ferry range: 1,100 km (680 mi, 590 nmi)
- Service ceiling: 4,000 m (13,000 ft)
- Take-off run: 80–100 m (260–330 ft)
- Landing run: 40 m (130 ft)
