= IAR 824 =

Romanian 6-place utility aircraft

IS-24, IAR-824
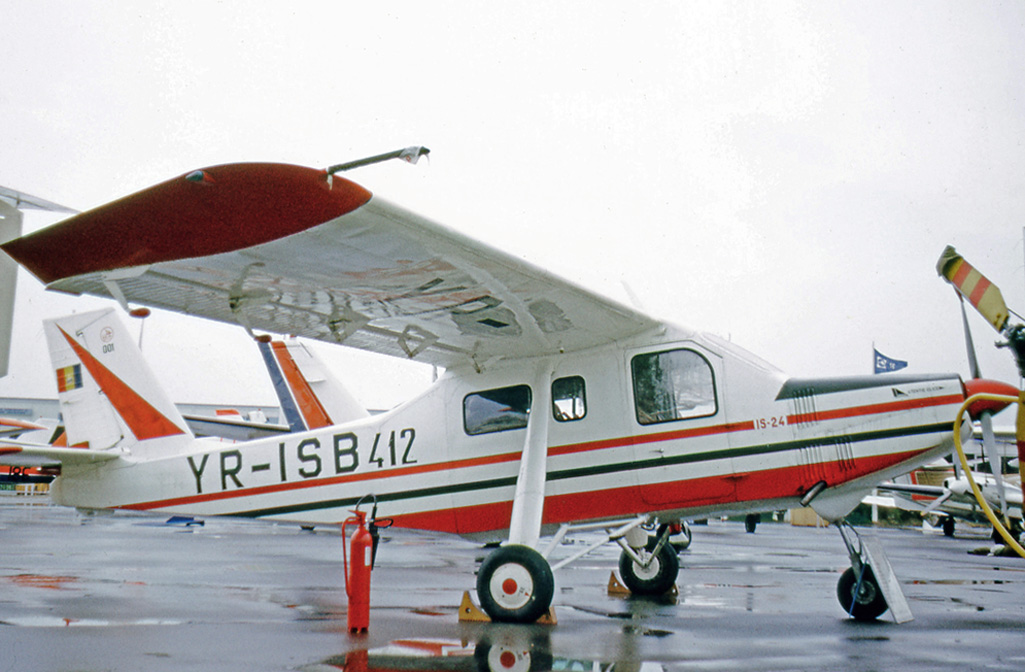
- The prototype IAR-824 fitted with tricycle undercarriage when displayed at the 1973 Paris Air Show

General information
- Type: Civil utility aircraft
- National origin: Romania
- Manufacturer: IAR
- Designer: Iosif Șilimon
- Number built: 10

History
- Introduction date: 1973
- First flight: 23 May 1971

The IAR-824 (originally known as the ICA IS-24) was a utility aircraft built in Romania in the 1970s.

== Development ==
Developed from the ICA IS-23A, it was a conventional high-wing cantilever monoplane of all-metal construction with fixed tricycle undercarriage and seating for six people within an enclosed cabin.

== Production ==
The first prototype made its maiden flight on 23 May 1971 with the type gaining its type certificate on 13 May 1972. It was exhibited at the 1973 Paris Air Show. Ten examples were built, including the prototype, some of which were fitted with a tailwheel undercarriage for glider towing, with five going to Romania's Aeroclub for training and glider towing.

== Aircraft on display ==
The aircraft with construction number 5 and registration YR-ISF is on display at the Clinceni Airfield near Bucharest.

The aircraft with registration YR-ISG is on display in Brașov.

== Specifications ==
Data from Jane's All The World's Aircraft 1976–77

General characteristics

- Crew: 1
- Capacity: 5 passengers
- Length: 9.10 m (29 ft 10 in)
- Wingspan: 12.40 m (40 ft 8 in)
- Height: 3.44 m (11 ft 3 in)
- Wing area: 23.60 m^{2} (254.0 sq ft)
- Aspect ratio: 6.6:1
- Airfoil: NACA 64_{2}-413.5
- Empty weight: 1,240 kg (2,734 lb)
- Max takeoff weight: 1,900 kg (4,189 lb)
- Fuel capacity: 325 L (71.5 Imp Gallons)
- Powerplant: 1 × Lycoming IO-540-C1D5 air cooled flat-six, 220 kW (290 hp)

Performance

- Maximum speed: 205 km/h (127 mph, 111 kn)
- Cruise speed: 180 km/h (110 mph, 97 kn)
- Stall speed: 75 km/h (47 mph, 40 kn)
- Range: 900 km (560 mi, 490 nmi)
- Service ceiling: 3,000 m (9,800 ft)
- Rate of climb: 3.00 m/s (591 ft/min)

== See also ==
Related development

- ICA IS-23

Aircraft of comparable role, configuration, and era

- Cessna 206
- Cessna 207
