= IAR 27 =

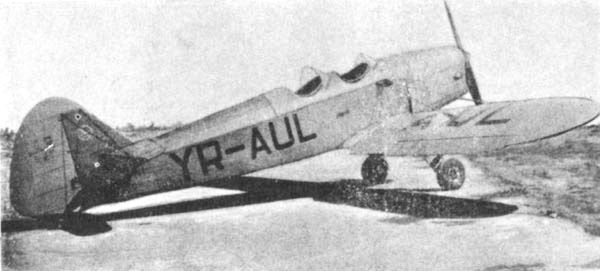

General information
- Type: Two-seat primary trainer
- National origin: Romania
- Manufacturer: IAR; SET
- Number built: 200+

History
- First flight: 1937

The IAR 27 was a 1930s Romanian two-seat low-wing monoplane primary trainer designed and built by Industria Aeronautică Română.

== Design and development ==
Based on the earlier IAR 21 and in particular the IAR 22 but the design was simplified to allow for mass-production. The IAR 27 was a braced low-wing monoplane powered by a 180 hp (134 kW) IAR 6-G1 piston engine and it had two open cockpits in tandem. More than 200 aircraft were built and they served with both civil and military training schools in Romania.

== Operators ==
Romania

- Royal Romanian Air Force

== Specifications ==
Data from The Illustrated Encyclopedia of Aircraft, Romanian Aeronautical Constructions 1905–1974

General characteristics

- Crew: 2
- Length: 7.41 m (24 ft 4 in)
- Wingspan: 9.10 m (29 ft 10 in)
- Height: 2.40 m (7 ft 10 in)
- Wing area: 16.60 m^{2} (178.7 sq ft)
- Empty weight: 670 kg (1,477 lb)
- Gross weight: 948 kg (2,090 lb)
- Powerplant: 1 × IAR 6-G1 inline piston engine , 130 kW (180 hp)

Performance

- Maximum speed: 180 km/h (110 mph, 97 kn)
- Minimum speed: 90 km/h (56 mph; 49 kn)
- Range: 400 km (250 mi, 220 nmi)
- Service ceiling: 5,000 m (16,000 ft)
