= ICA IS-29 =

1970s Romanian sailplane

IS-29, IS-31, and IS-33
- IS-29D2

General information
- Type: Club-class Sailplane
- National origin: Romania
- Manufacturer: ICA
- Designer: Iosif Șilimon
- Number built: >200

History
- First flight: April 1970

The ICA IS-29 was a sailplane built in Romania in the 1970s. The prefix IS comes from Iosif Șilimon, the Romanian IAR (Industria Aeronautică Română) aeronautical engineer who designed it.

== Design and development ==
The 15-metre (49ft 3in) single-seat variant of the IS-28 series, the IS-29D2 single-seater has retractable gear, camber-changing flaps and Hütter-type airbrakes on the upper wing surface only. The T-tail has a fixed stabilizer and elevator. The –29D model is of all-metal construction while the earlier –29B has wooden wings. Developments include 19 metre (62 ft) -29E2 and 20 metre (66 ft) -29E3 versions and a flapless, fixed gear 16.5-metre (54 feet) ‘club’ model -29G.

The IS-29 was also produced in a motorglider version, designated the IS-29EM. This shared the low-set wings and three-point undercarriage of the IS-28M2, and the new wings of the IS-28MA.

== Variants ==
- IS-29
  - IS-29B - wooden wings of 15-metre span
  - IS-29D
    - IS-29D2
      - IS-29D2 Club - Club-class version of IS-29D2
  - IS-29E - open class version with ballast tanks
    - IS-29E2 - version with 19-metre wings
    - IS-29E3 - version with 20-metre wings
  - IS-29EM - motorglider version
  - IS-29G - Club-class version with 16.5-metre wings
- IS-31 - IS-29 with 20-metre wings and linked flaps and ailerons
- IS-33 - IS-29 with tanks for 150 kg (300 lb) of water ballast

== Specifications (IS-29D2) ==
Data from Jane's All the World's Aircraft 1988-89

General characteristics

- Crew: One
- Length: 7.3 m (23 ft 11 in)
- Wingspan: 15 m (49 ft 3 in)
- Height: 1.68 m (5 ft 6 in)
- Wing area: 10.4 m^{2} (112 sq ft)
- Aspect ratio: 21.6
- Airfoil: root:Wortmann FX 61-163, tip:Wortmann FX 60-126/1
- Empty weight: 240 kg (529 lb)
- Max takeoff weight: 360 kg (794 lb)

Performance

- Stall speed: 65 km/h (40 mph, 35 kn) flaps down
- Never exceed speed: 225 km/h (140 mph, 121 kn) in smooth air
- Max rough air speed: 172 km/h (107 mph)
- Max aero-tow speed: 140 km/h (87 mph)
- Max winch-launch speed: 130 km/h (81 mph)
- g limits: +5.2 -2.65
- Maximum glide ratio: 37
- Best glide speed: 93 km/h (58 mph)
- Rate of sink: 0.65 m/s (128 ft/min)
- Minimum sink speed: 78 km/h (48 mph)
- Wing loading: 34.62 kg/m^{2} (7.09 lb/sq ft)

== See also ==
Related development

- ICA IS-28

Aircraft of comparable role, configuration, and era

- Pilatus B-4
- Schweizer SGS 1-34

== Notes ==
=== Bibliography ===
- Soaring Society of America
- Taylor, Michael J. H. (1989). Jane's Encyclopedia of Aviation. London: Studio Editions. p. 528.
- Hardy, Michael (1982). Gliders and Sailplanes of the World. Shepperton: Ian Allan. pp. 54–55.
- Coates, Andrew (1978). Jane's World Sailplanes and Motor Gliders. London: MacDonald and Jane's. p. 124.
- Simpson, R. W. (1995). Airlife's General Aviation. Shrewsbury: Airlife Publishing. p. 342.
- Jane's All the World's Aircraft 1977-78. London: Jane's Yearbooks. p. 608.
