= ICA IS-28 =

Two-seat sailplane

IS-28
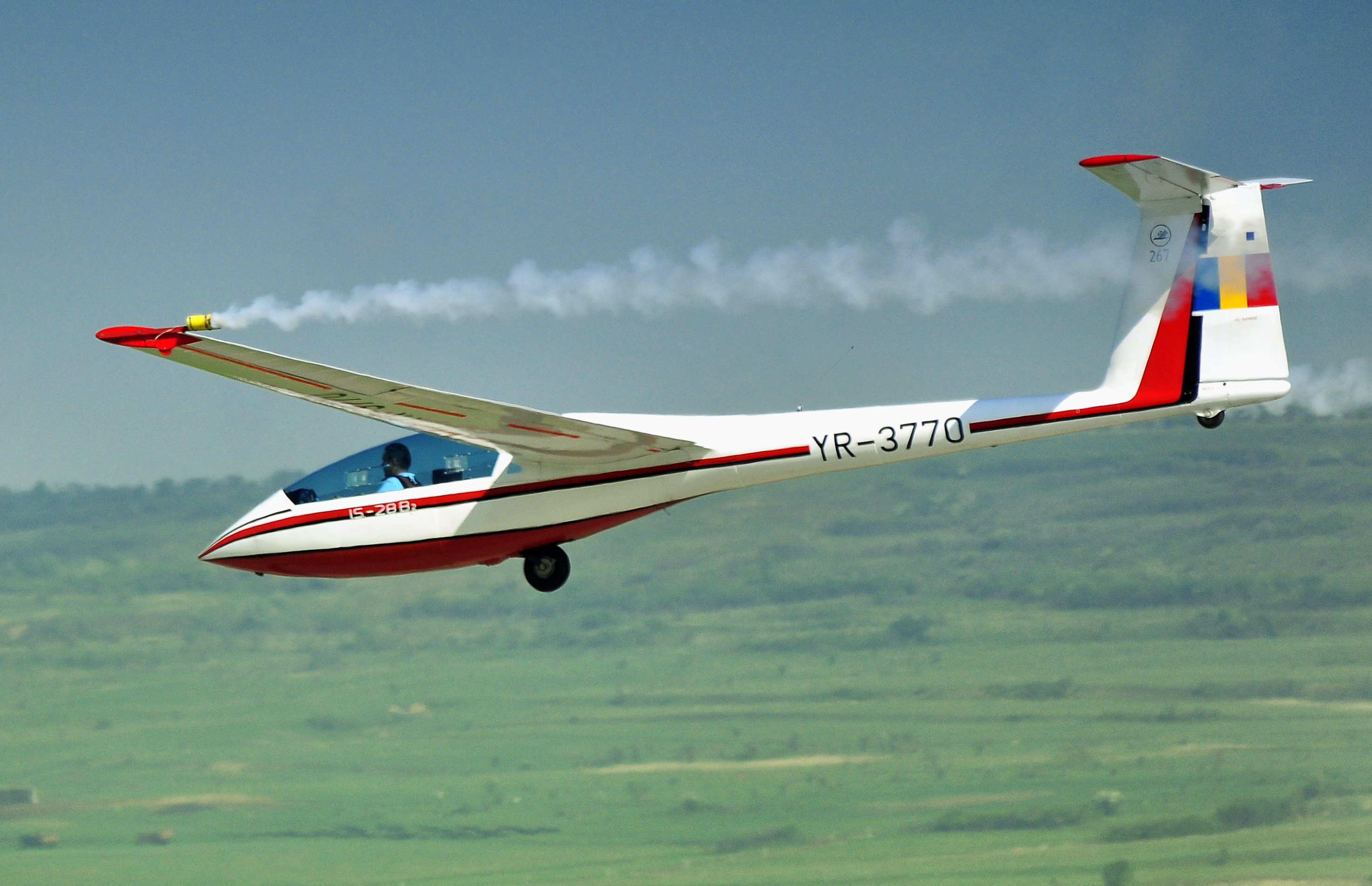
- IS-28B2

General information
- Type: Sailplane
- National origin: Romania
- Manufacturer: ICA
- Designer: Iosif Șilimon
- Number built: ca. 400

History
- First flight: August 1970
- Variant: IAR-46

The ICA IS-28 is a two-seat sailplane produced in Romania in the 1970s. An all-metal aircraft of conventional design with a T-tail, it was originally produced with 15-metre wings, but in 1973, production shifted to the IS-28B with 17-metre wings and numerous aerodynamic refinements. These included a smaller tail with decreased dihedral, decreased dihedral on the wings, and redesigned fuselage contours. This version first flew on 26 April 1973 and was subsequently produced in versions with flaps (IS-28B2) and without (IS-28B1). Around 100 had been built by the early 1980s, with a substantial number sold for export. On April 7, 1979, Tom Knauff and R. Tawse set a world record with the IS-28 B2 glider, covering a distance of 829 kilometres on a predetermined out-and-return course from the Ridge Soaring Gliderport in Julian, Pennsylvania.

The IS-28B2 is depicted in the film Escape from New York (1981)

The IS-28 was also produced as a motorglider, initially as just a powered version of the IS-28B2 (designated the IS-28M1) and then as the more radically redesigned IS-28M2. This version had an entirely new forward fuselage offering side-by-side seating for the two occupants, wings relocated to a low-set position on the fuselage, and tailwheel undercarriage with main units that semi-retracted backwards into the wings. The rear fuselage, empennage, and outer wing panels remained identical with the sailplane version.

The IS-29 is a single-seat sailplane that was designed and manufactured to complement training carried out in the IS-28 two-seater.

The IS-30 is a refined IS-28B2, identical in most respects other than having all-metal control surfaces (where the IS-28 has fabric-covered surfaces) and a re-designed horizontal stabiliser.

== Variants ==
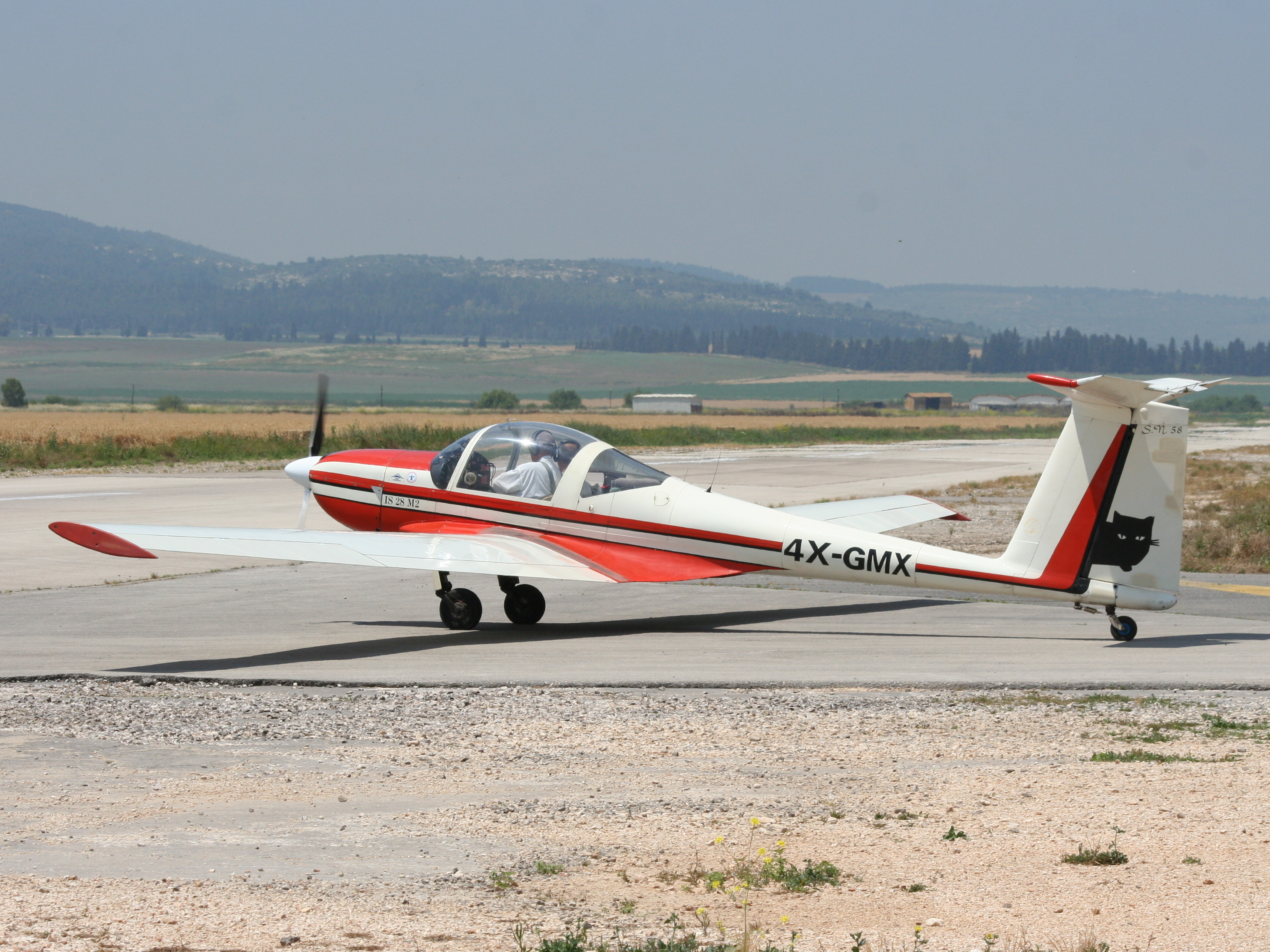
IS-28M2

- IS-28 - sailplane with 15 metre wings
- IS-28B
  - IS-28B1 - sailplane with 17 metre wings and DFS-style airbrakes
  - IS-28B2 - similar to IS-28B1 with flaps and Schempp-Hirth-style airbrakes
- IS-28M
  - IS-28M1 (aka IAR-34)- tandem seat motorglider version of IS-28B1 with Limbach SL.1700E1 engine
  - IS-28M2 - motor-glider with side-by-side seating and three-point undercarriage
  - IAR-28M2A - IS-28M2 with new wing, split flaps and Limbach L.2000E01 engine
- IS-30 - all-metal IS-28B2 with new tailplane.
- IAR-46 - trainer version of IS-28M2 with reduced wingspan and Rotax 912A engine

== Operators ==
Romania

- Romanian Air Force - received 10 IAR-28MA from 1984.
- The Romanian Airclub - still using IS-28B2 and IS-29D2 for glider pilots in training and performer pilots. A fleet of 5 IS-28M2 motor-gliders were restored and declared able to fly again.

== Specifications (IS-28B2) ==
Data from Jane's All the World's Aircraft 1988-89

General characteristics

- Crew: 2
- Length: 8.45 m (27 ft 9 in)
- Wingspan: 17 m (55 ft 9 in)
- Height: 1.87 m (6 ft 2 in)
- Wing area: 18.24 m^{2} (196.3 sq ft)
- Aspect ratio: 15.8
- Airfoil: root:Wortmann FX-61-163; Wortmann FX-60-126
- Empty weight: 375 kg (827 lb)
- Max takeoff weight: 590 kg (1,301 lb) dual

Performance

- Stall speed: 65 km/h (40 mph, 35 kn) dual
- Never exceed speed: 230 km/h (140 mph, 120 kn) dual, in smooth air
- Max rough air speed: 165 km/h (89 kn; 103 mph)
- Max aero-tow speed: 140 km/h (76 kn; 87 mph)
- Max winch-launch speed: 125 km/h (67 kn; 78 mph)
- G limits dual =+5.3 -2.65
- G limits acro: =+6.5 -4
- Maximum glide ratio: 34
- Best glide speed: 100 km/h (54 kn; 62 mph) (dual)
- Best glide speed:94 km/h (51 kn; 58 mph) (solo)
- Best glide speed dual sink rate: ms=0.86 (obtained at 100km/h)
- Best glide speed solo sink rate: ms=0.82 (obtained at 94km/h)
- Wing loading: 32.34 kg/m^{2} (6.62 lb/sq ft) dual
