= ICA IAR-35 =

IAR-35
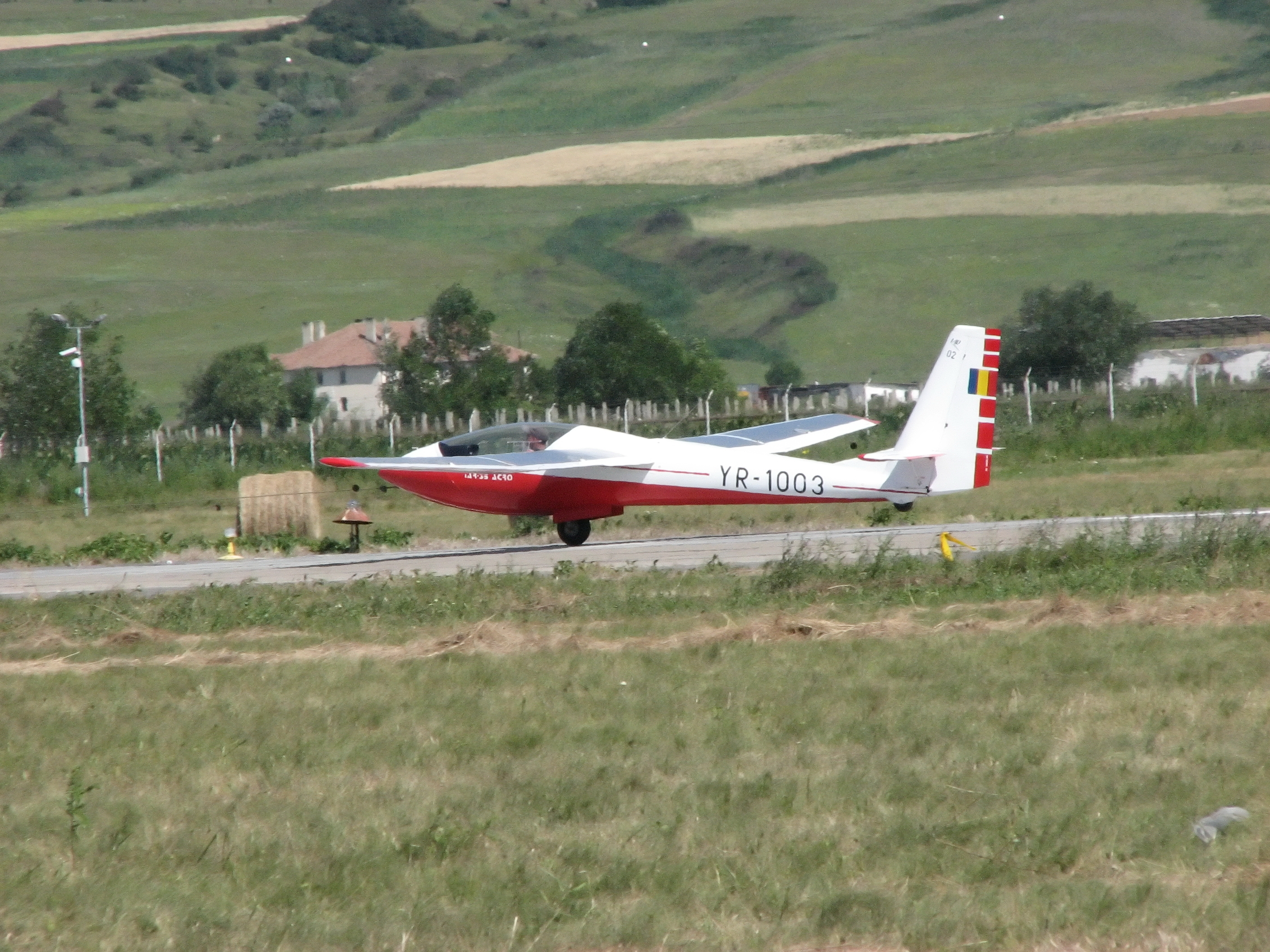

General information
- Type: aerobatic glider
- National origin: Romania
- Manufacturer: Inteprinderea de Constructii Aeronautice (ICA), Brașov
- Number built: at least 4

History
- First flight: May 1986

The ICA IAR-35 is a Romanian glider designed and built in the 1980s primarily for aerobatics, though capable of general purpose use. Several production prototypes were constructed.

== Design and development ==
The IAR-35 is an all-metal, single seat, short span glider developed for aerobatic flight. Its three spar shoulder wing, with metal ribs and bonded metal skinning, has a constant chord centre section and tapered outer panels. There is no dihedral on the centre section but 2° outboard. The whole trailing edge is occupied by all-metal, statically balanced ailerons, each fitted with an automatic trim tab. DFS (Schempp-Hirth) airbrakes extend both above and below the wings.

Its fuselage is a metal semi-monocoque with aluminium alloy framing and duralumin skin. The cockpit is ahead of the wing with the pilot under a long, single piece Perspex canopy. On the underside, below the wing there is a monowheel, fitted with a brake, which retracts behind a pair of doors. The IAR-35 also has a fixed, semi-recessed tailwheel and a skid under the nose. The wing tips are protected by small, sprung balance wheels. Its fuselage becomes more slender behind the wing, mounting a conventional empennage with tall, straight edged, swept vertical surfaces and a dorsal fillet. The rudder is statically balanced and has a vertical trailing edge. A braced tailplane is mounted forward on the fin, a little above the fuselage, carrying similarly balanced elevators fitted with trim tabs.

The IAR-35 first flew in May 1986. Only a few were built but four remained on the Romanian civil register in 2010.

== Specifications ==
Data from Jane's All the World's Aircraft 1990/91, Jane's All the World's Aircraft 1988-89

General characteristics

- Crew: One
- Length: 6.47 m (21 ft 3 in)
- Wingspan: 12.0 m (39 ft 4 in)
- Height: 1.72 m (5 ft 8 in)
- Wing area: 10.80 m^{2} (116.3 sq ft)
- Aspect ratio: 13.3
- Airfoil: NACA 64-015
- Empty weight: 250 kg (551 lb) - 270 kg (595.2 lb)
- Max takeoff weight: 380 kg (838 lb)

Performance

- Stall speed: 86 km/h (53 mph, 46 kn)
- Never exceed speed: 380 km/h (240 mph, 210 kn) in smooth air
- Max rough air speed (V_{A}): 202 km/h (109 kn; 126 mph)
- g limits: +7 -5
- Maximum glide ratio: 26
- Best glide speed: 100 km/h (54 kn; 62 mph)
- Rate of sink: 0.85 m/s (167 ft/min) *Minimum sink speed: 95 km/h (51 kn; 59 mph)
- Wing loading: 35.19 kg/m^{2} (7.21 lb/sq ft)
