= IAR 316 =

Light utility helicopter

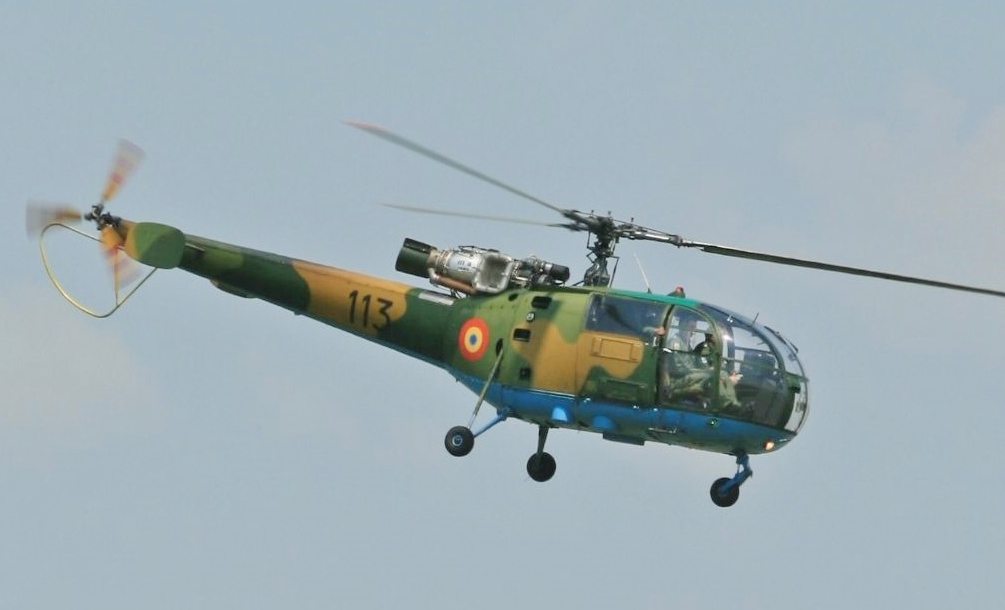
- IAR 316 at Otopeni Air Show 2010

General information
- Type: Light utility/training helicopter
- Manufacturer: Industria Aeronautică Română
- Status: operational for training purposes
- Primary user: Romanian Air Force
- Number built: 250

History
- Manufactured: 1971-1987
- Introduction date: 1971
- Developed from: Aérospatiale Alouette III

The IAR 316 is a Romanian license-built Aérospatiale SA 316B Alouette III manufactured by Industria Aeronautică Română (IAR).

== Design and development ==
=== IAR 316 ===
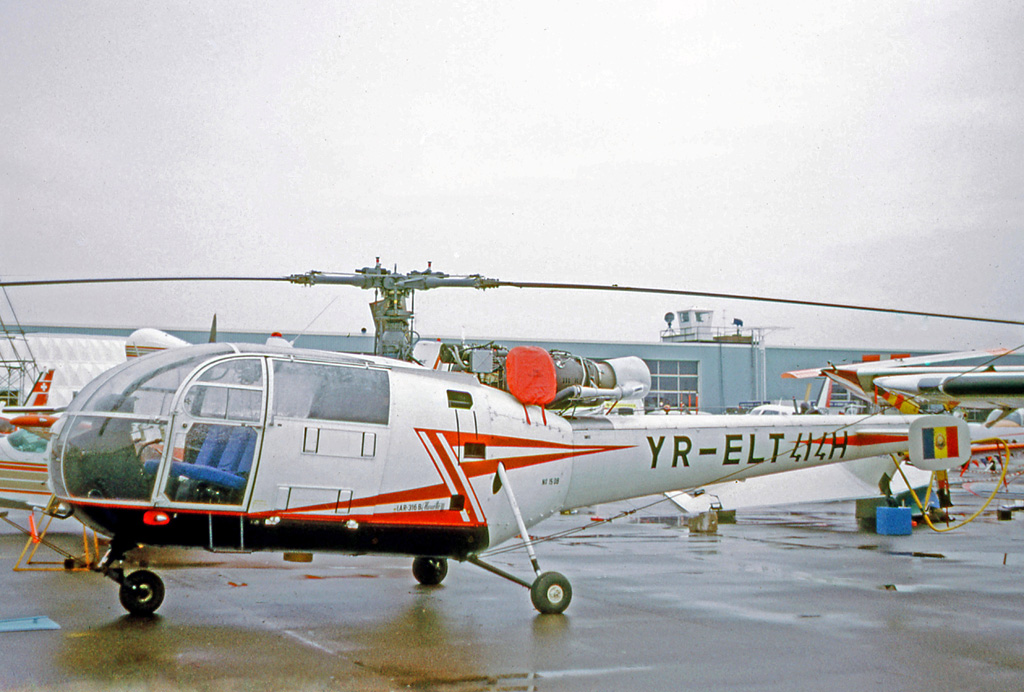
IAR 316B exhibited at the 1973 Paris Air Show

IAR began manufacturing the IAR 316 in 1971 at its plant near Brașov, Romania. Production ended in 1987. 250 units were built, 125 of those were built for the Military of Romania, which still uses it to this day in a training capacity. Some IAR 316s were operated in the civilian role in Romania and others were exported to various nations, including Pakistan, Angola, and Guinea. The IAR 316 was modified to carry weapons more common in the Eastern-bloc, such as 57mm rocket pods, 7.62mm machine guns, and anti-tank missiles. An early example was exhibited at the Paris Air Show in June 1973.

=== IAR 317 ===
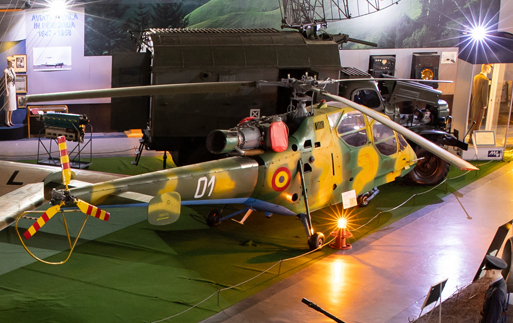
The IAR 317 prototype at the National Museum of Romanian Aviation

The IAR 317 Airfox was an attempt by IAR to make an attack helicopter out of the IAR 316. Equipped with the same license-produced Turbomeca Artouste IIIB turboshaft, the IAR 317 featured a stepped two-seat armored cockpit for the pilot and the gunner. The tail boom and rear fuselage was almost identical to the 316. Stub wings mounted on either side of the airframe allowed for the carriage of weapons, including rocket pods, machine guns, and anti-tank missiles. Only one prototype was built. It participated in the 1985 Paris Air Show.

== Operators ==
Angola

- National Air Force of Angola

Romania

- Romanian Air Force

== Specifications (IAR 316) ==

General characteristics

- Crew: 2
- Capacity: 5 passengers
- Length: 12.82 m (42 ft 1 in)
- Height: 2.97 m (9 ft 9 in)
- Empty weight: 1,050 kg (2,315 lb)
- Max takeoff weight: 2,200 kg (4,850 lb)
- Fuel capacity: 550 kg (1,210 lb) maximum
- Fuselage width: 2.6 m (8 ft 6 in)
- Powerplant: 1 × Turbomeca Artouste IIIB turboshaft, 425 kW (570 hp)
- Main rotor diameter: 3 × 11.02 m (36 ft 2 in)
- Main rotor area: 95.4 m^{2} (1,027 sq ft)

Performance

- Maximum speed: 210 km/h (130 mph, 110 kn)
- Cruise speed: 180 km/h (110 mph, 97 kn)
- Range: 540 km (340 mi, 290 nmi)
- Service ceiling: 3,200 m (10,500 ft)
- Rate of climb: 4.33 m/s (852 ft/min)

Armament

- 1 × 7.62mm machine gun pod with 1,000 rounds
- 2 hardpoints for anti-tank guided missiles

== See also ==
Related development

- Aérospatiale Alouette II
- Aérospatiale Alouette III

Aircraft of comparable role, configuration, and era

- Aérospatiale Gazelle
- Hughes H-6

Related lists

- List of helicopters
