= IAR 811 =

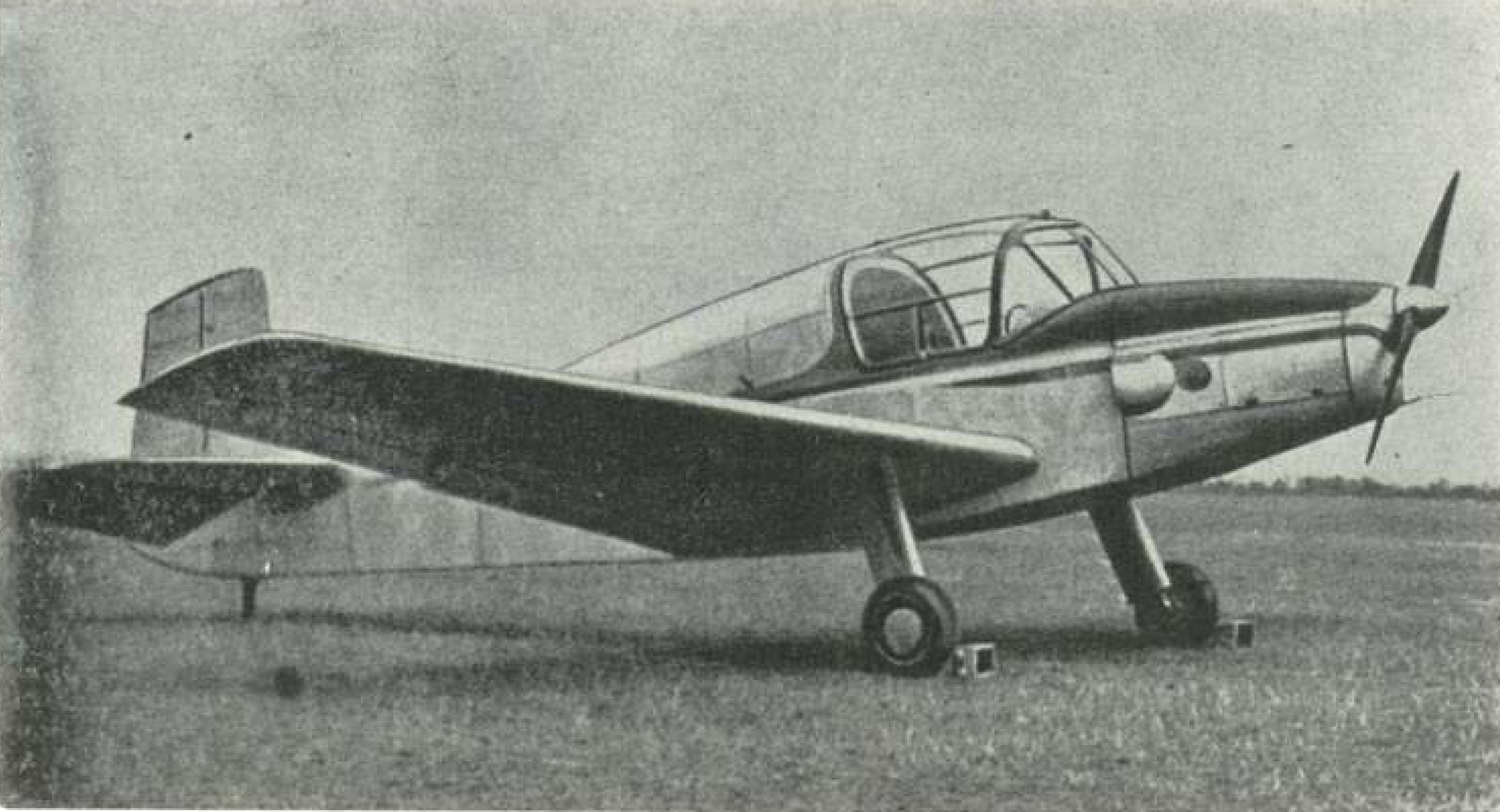

General information
- Type: 2-seat aircraft
- National origin: Romania
- Manufacturer: Industria Aeronautică Română
- Number built: 1

History
- First flight: 1949
- Variant: IAR-813

The IAR-811 was a Romanian trainer aircraft built in the late 1940s. It was the first aircraft designed and built in Romania following the end of the Second World War.

The IAR-811 was designed by a team of designers at the Sovromtractor tractor factory at Brașov (formerly the Industria Aeronautică Română aircraft works) in 1949. It was a single-engined low-wing monoplane of all wooden construction. Its crew sat side by side under an enclosed canopy, and the aircraft was powered by a single 45 kW (60 hp) Train 6T engine. The only example made its first flight on 12 May 1949. It was claimed to be very manoeuvrable, and have good handling, and it was reported that consideration was given to putting the type into production, but the engine was no longer in production. The aircraft was developed into the IAR-813, which used the available and more powerful (120 kW (160 hp) Walter Minor 4 engine.

== Specifications ==
Data from Romanian Aeronautical Constructions 1905–1974

General characteristics

- Crew: 2
- Length: 8.25 m (27 ft 1 in)
- Wingspan: 10.4 m (34 ft 1 in)
- Height: 2.2 m (7 ft 3 in)
- Wing area: 17.3 m^{2} (186 sq ft)
- Empty weight: 420 kg (926 lb)
- Gross weight: 650 kg (1,433 lb)
- Fuel capacity: 55 L (15 US gal; 12 imp gal)
- Powerplant: 1 × Train 6T 6-cylinder inverted air-cooled in-line piston engine, 45 kW (60 hp)
- Propellers: 2-bladed fixed-pitch propeller

Performance

- Maximum speed: 150 km/h (93 mph, 81 kn)
- Cruise speed: 135 km/h (84 mph, 73 kn)
- Stall speed: 65 km/h (40 mph, 35 kn)
- Range: 450 km (280 mi, 240 nmi)
- Service ceiling: 3,700 m (12,100 ft)
- Time to altitude: 8 minutes to 1,000 metres (3,300 ft)
- Take-off run: 180 m (590 ft)
- Landing run: 140 m (460 ft)
