= ICA IS-23 =

Monoplane

IS-23

General information
- Type: Light STOL utility aircraft
- Manufacturer: ICA-Brasov (Intreprinderea de Construcţii Aeronautice), Braşov, Rumania
- Designer: Iosif Șilimon
- Number built: 1?

History
- First flight: 1968
- Variant: ICA IS-24

The ICA IS-23 was a single-engined high-wing monoplane with STOL capability that was built in Romania in the 1960s. It was developed into the similar ICA IS-24.

== Design and development ==
The IS-23 was designed by Iosif Șilimon, a Romanian better known for his series of sailplanes including the IS-3, -8, and -10 to -13. In contrast, the IS-23 was a high-wing single-engined monoplane with a radial engine and tricycle undercarriage. It was built to a Romanian government specification calling for an aircraft capable of agricultural and ambulance work or of towing gliders. In addition, it was to have STOL capabilities.

The IS-23 was an all-metal aircraft. It had a high cantilever wing with constant chord inboard and slight taper beyond with almost square tips. The wing was equipped with various high lift devices to achieve the required STOL capability. The tail surfaces were constant chord and straight tipped, though the fin and rudder were slightly swept. The tailplane was mounted on top of the fuselage. The rudder was horn balanced, fitted with a trim tab and cut away at the bottom to allow movement of the single piece elevator, also horn balanced.

It was powered by a compactly cowled 9-cylinder, 300 hp (220 kW) Ivchenko AI-14RF radial engine. Behind it, the fuselage was flat sided. The cabin stretched from forward of the wing to well behind it with almost continuous glazing on both sides and could accommodate up to six people including the pilot. It could also be configured to carry two stretchers plus attendant and pilot. There were doors to the front seats on both sides and a third, port side, passenger door. Beyond the cabin, the fuselage the straight upper fuselage line continued but sides and bottom tapered to the tail. The IS-23's tall, fixed tricycle undercarriage had each main wheel supported from the fuselage centre line by a pair of asymmetric V-legs with a separate damping strut, mounted on the outer fuselage bottom, attached to the aft one. The wheeled undercarriage could be replaced with either floats or skis.

Trials of the IS-23 began in mid 1968. Take off distances, dependent on load, were between 120–185 m (395–610 ft) and landings took 60–80 m (195–260 ft). The aircraft was later developed into the ICA IS-24, chiefly by replacing the radial engine with a flat 6-cylinder Lycoming, reducing the cabin glazing and lowering and widening the undercarriage.

== Specifications ==
Data from Observer's Book of Aircraft 1969

General characteristics

- Crew: 1 pilot
- Capacity: up to 5 passengers
- Length: 9.10 m (29 ft 10 in)
- Wingspan: 12.40 m (40 ft 8 in)
- Height: 3.60 m (11 ft 10 in)
- Empty weight: 1,350 kg (2,976 lb)
- Gross weight: 2,100 kg (4,630 lb)
- Powerplant: 1 × Ivchenko AI-14RF 9-cylinder radial, 220 kW (300 hp)

Performance

- Maximum speed: 204 km/h (127 mph, 110 kn) at sea level
- Cruise speed: 180 km/h (112 mph, 97 kn) at 1,500 m (4,920 ft)
- Service ceiling: 4,800 m (15,700 ft) at 2,050 kg (4,519 lb)
- Rate of climb: 4.00 m/s (787 ft/min) initial rate with maximum load
