= IAR 825 =

General information
- Type: Trainer aircraft
- National origin: Romania
- Manufacturer: Industria Aeronautică Română
- Status: Prototype only
- Number built: 1

History
- First flight: 12 June 1982
- Developed from: IAR-823

The IAR-825 Triumf is a Romanian-designed tandem multirole trainer aircraft based on the IAR-823 built for the Romanian Air Force. The aircraft is roughly in the same class with the Brazilian EMBRAER Tucano. The IAR-825 is equipped with the Canadian Pratt & Whitney Canada PT6 turboprop engine. The type's first flight took place on 12 June 1982.

== Development and design ==
Industria Aeronautică Română (IAR) developed the IAR-823 four-seat light aircraft in the 1970s, with 87 examples being built at IAR's Brasov factory between 1973 and 1985 which were mainly used by the Romanian Air Force as acrobatic trainers.

In 1980, IAR began work on a turboprop-powered two-seat multi-role training aircraft for the Romanian Air Force, the IAR-825TP Triumf, based on the IAR-823. The Triumf was a low-wing cantilever monoplane of all metal construction with a retractable tricycle landing gear. It had a new fuselage, with pilot and instructor sitting in tandem in an enclosed cockpit, while retaining the wings of the IAR-823. Instead of the 220 kW (290 hp) Lycoming IO-540 piston engine used by the IAR-823, the prototype IAR-825TP was powered by a Canadian Pratt & Whitney Canada PT6A-15AG turboprop, rated at 510 kW (680 shp), driving a three-bladed Hartzell propeller, although production aircraft were reported to be planned to use 560 kW (750 shp) PT6A-25C engines, while consideration was also given to using the Czechoslovak Walter M601 turboprop.

The prototype Triumf, registration YR-IGB, was flown for the first time on 12 June 1982, and in September that year was exhibited at the Farnborough International Airshow. While the IAR-825TP was tested by the Romanian Air Force, the use of an expensive western engine and propeller discouraged the type being selected, and no production followed, with only the single prototype built. A piston-engined derivative, the IAR-831, was also built, but this too was not selected for production. License-built Soviet Yakovlev Yak-52 were used instead to satisfy Romania's trainer requirements.

Only one prototype aircraft exists, formerly registered YR-IGB. It was sold and registered in the US in 2006 as N825BA. It was damaged in a forced landing on July 15, 2012. It is currently registered by the Federal Aviation Authority as airworthy and active on the US civil aircraft register website as at November 2019.

== Operators ==
Romania

- Romanian Air Force

== Specifications (IAR-825) ==
Data from Jane's All The World's Aircraft 1988-89

General characteristics

- Crew: 2
- Length: 8.99 m (29 ft 6 in)
- Wingspan: 10 m (32 ft 10 in)
- Height: 3.2 m (10 ft 6 in)
- Wing area: 15 m^{2} (160 sq ft)
- Airfoil: NACA 23012 (modified)
- Empty weight: 1,250 kg (2,756 lb)
- Max takeoff weight: 2,300 kg (5,071 lb)
- Powerplant: 1 × Pratt & Whitney Canada PT6A-15AG turboprop engine, 507 kW (680 hp)
- Propellers: 3-bladed Hartzell HC-B3TN-3/T10173-13R constant-speed propeller

Performance

- Maximum speed: 470 km/h (290 mph, 250 kn)
- Cruise speed: 440 km/h (270 mph, 240 kn)
- Stall speed: 105 km/h (65 mph, 57 kn)
- Never exceed speed: 550 km/h (340 mph, 300 kn)
- Range: 1,400 km (870 mi, 760 nmi)
- Service ceiling: 9,000 m (30,000 ft)
- g limits: + 6, -3G
- Rate of climb: 16 m/s (3,100 ft/min)

== See also ==
Aircraft of comparable role, configuration, and era

- Embraer EMB 312 Tucano
