= IAR 814 =

Aircraft designed and built in Romania in the early 1950s

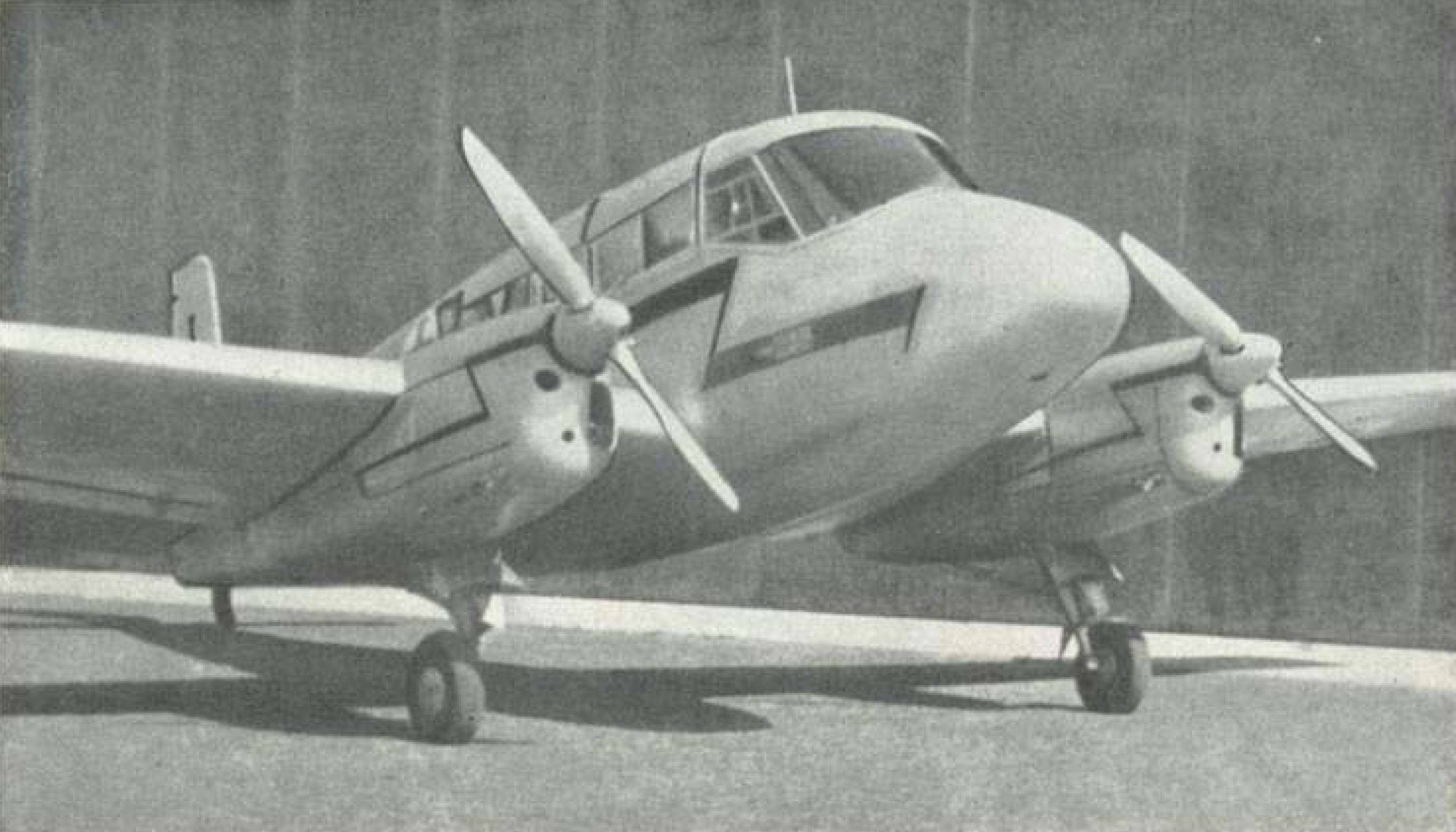

General information
- Type: Trainer, ambulance and light transport aircraft
- National origin: Romania
- Manufacturer: Industria Aeronautică Română
- Number built: 10

History
- First flight: 1953

The IAR-814, aka MR-2, was a Romanian designed and built twin-engined trainer aircraft built in the early 1950s, the first twin-engined aircraft wholly designed and built in Romania.

== Design ==
Originally designed by Radu Manicatide and fine-tuned by the Uzinele de Reparații Material Volant-3 (URMV-3) of the Industria Aeronautică Română, the IAR 814 was a three-seat low-wing monoplane of mixed construction, primarily designed as a trainer, but could also serve as a transport. Power was supplied by two Walter Minor 6-III engines, and the aircraft was also equipped with blind-flying instrumentation and radios. The main wheels of the tail-wheel undercarriage retracted into the rear of the engine nacelles. The two prototypes and 8 production aircraft were registered as YR-MRA to YR-MRJ.

== Operational history ==
The IAR-814 was designed with long-distance flying in mind and established a long-distance world record in class C-1d, (contemporary FAI class), on 14–15 October 1961; flying a distance of 4,462.87 km (2,773.10 mi; 2,409.76 nmi) over a circuit between Băneasa-Alexeni Airfield-Strejnic-Băneasa, piloted by Octavian Băcunu and Vladimir Viscun, in a time of 20 hours 41 minutes at 216 km/h (134 mph; 117 kn).

== Variants ==
IAR-814
Two prototype trainer/light transport aircraft
MR-2
Production aircraft; 8 built

== Specifications ==
Data from Romanian Aeronautical Constructions 1905–1974

General characteristics

- Crew: 3
- Length: 11.05 m (36 ft 3 in)
- Wingspan: 14.00 m (45 ft 11 in)
- Height: 2.92 m (9 ft 7 in)
- Wing area: 28 m^{2} (300 sq ft)
- Empty weight: 1,400 kg (3,086 lb)
- Gross weight: 2,030 kg (4,475 lb)
- Powerplant: 2 × Walter Minor 6-III 6-cylinder inverted air-cooled in-line piston engine, 120 kW (160 hp) each
- Propellers: 2-bladed variable-pitch propellers

Performance

- Maximum speed: 272 km/h (169 mph, 147 kn)
- Cruise speed: 230 km/h (140 mph, 120 kn)
- Stall speed: 85 km/h (53 mph, 46 kn)
- Range: 950 km (590 mi, 510 nmi)
- Service ceiling: 5,600 m (18,400 ft)
