= IAR 813 =

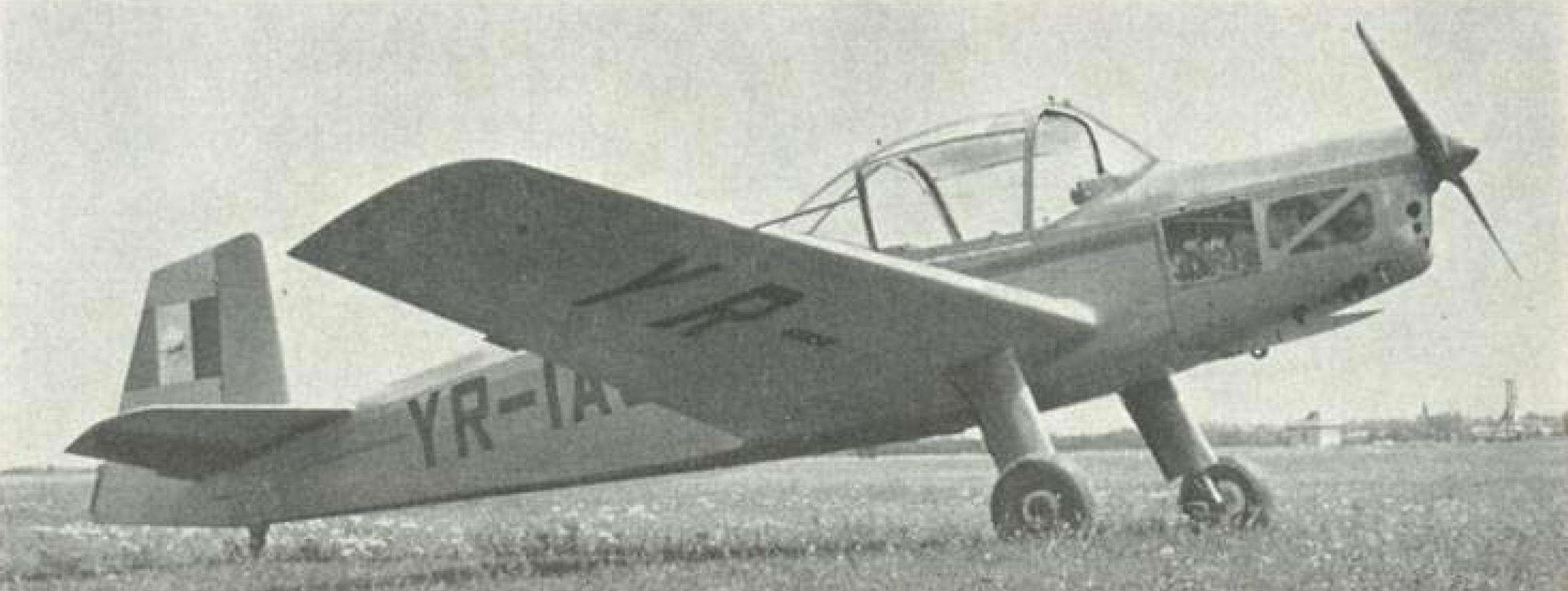

General information
- Type: Trainer aircraft
- National origin: Romania
- Manufacturer: Industria Aeronautică Română
- Number built: 80

History
- First flight: 15 March 1950
- Developed from: IAR-811

The IAR-813 was a Romanian trainer aircraft based on the IAR-811. It differed from the IAR 811 in having a bubble canopy and more powerful engine.

== Construction and design ==
Following the flight of the IAR-811 wooden two-seat training aircraft in 1949, the design team at the Sovromtractor tractor factory at Brașov (formerly the Industria Aeronautică Română aircraft works), led by Radu Manicatide, began work on the IAR-813, a more powerful trainer of similar layout. The IAR-813 was, like the IAR-811, a low-winged, single-engine monoplane with side-by-side seating for the crew of two, but differed in being of mixed wood and metal construction compared with the all wooden IAR-811. It had a welded steel tube fuselage structure and a wooden wing, with the structure covered by plywood and fabric. The aircraft was powered by a single 78 kW (105 hp) Walter Minor 4-III air-cooled in-line piston engine. The IAR-813 made its maiden flight on 16 March 1950, and the type was certificated on 1 December that year.

== Service ==
An initial batch of 50 aircraft were built for the Romanian Air Force from 1953, with a further 30 IAR-813s delivered to civil sport flying organisations in 1954–55. The type remained in use with the Air Force until at least 1955. 24 civilian aircraft were transferred to air-ambulance duties in 1961.

== Specifications ==
Data from Romanian Aeronautical Constructions 1905–1974

General characteristics

- Crew: 2
- Length: 8.35 m (27 ft 5 in)
- Wingspan: 10 m (32 ft 10 in)
- Height: 2.25 m (7 ft 5 in)
- Wing area: 15 m^{2} (160 sq ft)
- Empty weight: 498 kg (1,098 lb)
- Gross weight: 750 kg (1,653 lb)
- Powerplant: 1 × Walter Minor 4-III 4-cylinder inverted air-cooled in-line piston engine, 78 kW (105 hp)

Performance

- Maximum speed: 192 km/h (119 mph, 104 kn)
- Stall speed: 75 km/h (47 mph, 40 kn)
- Range: 700 km (430 mi, 380 nmi)
- Service ceiling: 5,800 m (19,000 ft)
- Take-off run: 180 m (590 ft)
- Landing run: 150 m (490 ft)
