= IAR-15 =

Romanian fighter prototype

IAR 15
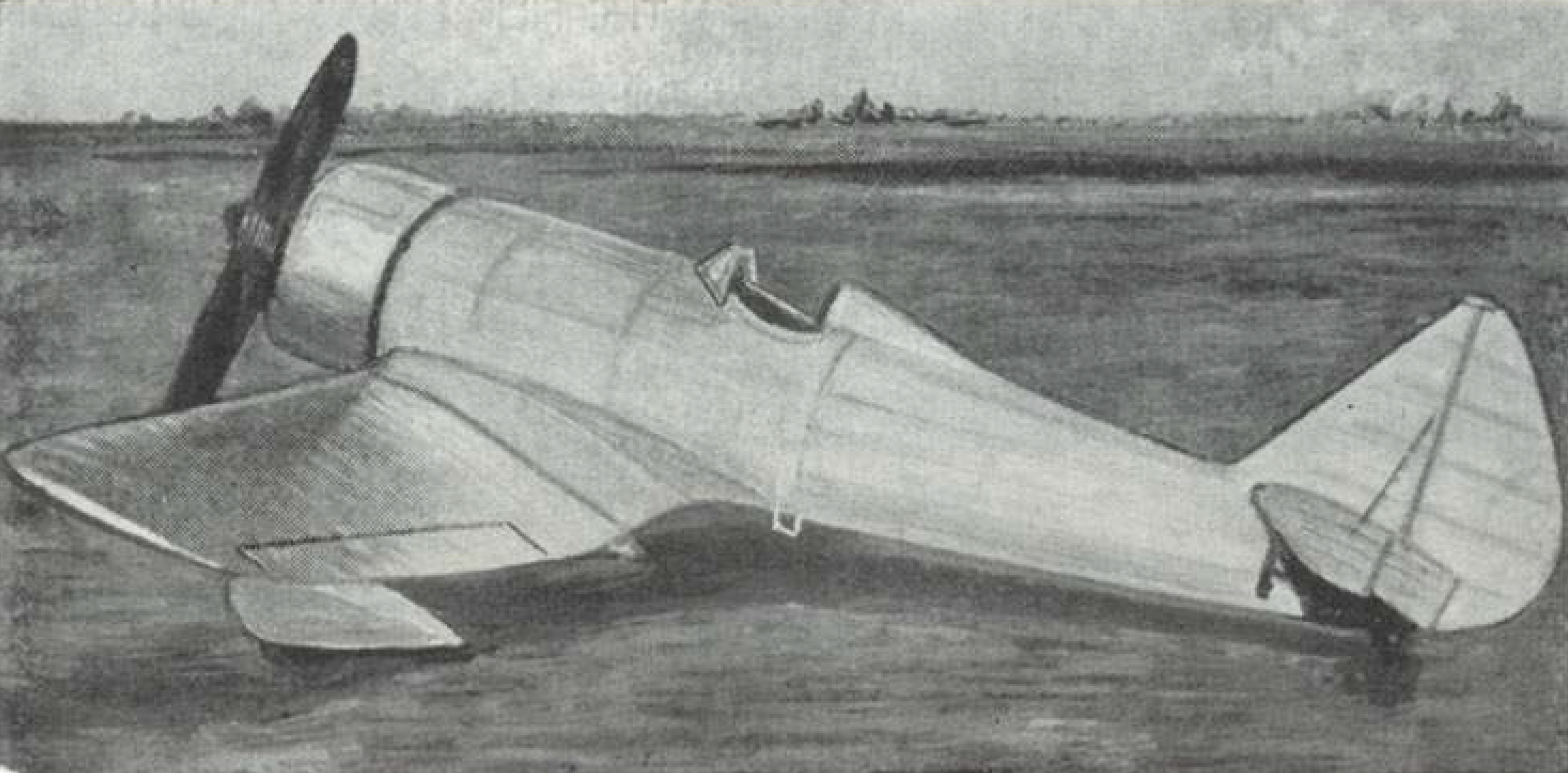

General information
- Type: single-seat fighter
- National origin: Romania
- Manufacturer: Industria Aeronautică Română (IAR)
- Designer: Elie Carafoli
- Number built: 5

History
- First flight: 1933

The IAR 15 was a low-wing monoplane fighter designed in Romania in 1933. Designed by Elie Carafoli for the Romanian Air Force, the IAR 15 was a lightly armed low-wing cantilever monoplane with a radial engine, fixed undercarriage and open cockpit.

== Development ==
The sustained efforts of Elie Carafoli and his team paid dividends when the first order for IAR 14 was finally placed. With production started and a small profit secured, Dipl.-Eng. Carafoli decided to try something new. The result was the I.A.R. 15. The inline engine was abandoned and instead a radial powerplant was substituted. Accordingly, the front fuselage underwent a major redesign. The cross-section was rounded and an NACA ring covered the 600 h.p. (447 kW) Gnome & Rhône 9Krse engine. With the new nine-cylinder radial the aircraft attained a top speed of 375 km/h at 4,000 m and could climb to 5,000 m in 8 minutes. The ceiling was raised to 10,500 m and an endurance of 600 km was possible. The I.A.R. 15 could intercept any contemporary major bomber type.

Alongside the new front fuselage section, other structural changes had been implemented as well. The cross-section of the rear fuselage was enlarged and reinforced. The fuselage was a steel tube structure covered with dural forward of the cockpit and fabric aft. The tail was redesigned again, this time to a triangular shape and was also built of steel tube and dural-covered. An aerodynamically improved single strut undercarriage featuring wheel spats was fitted near the wing roots and a small wheel replaced the previous tailskid. Instead of the crash-pylon featured on earlier models, a rounded knob appeared behind the pilot's headrest. The wings were rounded and shortened to 11.00 m, giving 19.00 m^{2} total area, and were built around two dural spars with a mixture of wood and metal ribs. The open cockpit was aft of the wing trailing edge. The undercarriage had a wide track, with vertical wire braced and faired legs carrying spatted main wheels.

Power was from an I.A.R. 9KIc40 licence-built Gnome-Rhône 9K engine of 450 kW (600 hp) enclosed in a NACA cowling. In the first prototype this drove a two-bladed wooden airscrew, but later machines had three-bladed metal propellers.

Five prototypes were built. Tests showed that the IAR 15 was as fast as competing aircraft, chiefly the PZL P.11, but less manoeuvrable and no other orders were placed.

== Operational history ==
In all aspects, the I.A.R.-15, test flown in early 1934 by 1st Lt. Alex. Papana, was a good match for other monoplane fighter types of its time, such as the Dewoitine D.500 of L'Armée de l'Air, the Boeing P-26 "Peashooter" of the U.S. Army Air Corps or the Polikarpov I-16 of the Voyenno-vozdushnyye sily. The speed capability of the I.A.R.15 was judged excellent and it established a national altitude record of 11631m in 1936.

== Operators ==
Romania

- Royal Romanian Air Force

== Specifications ==
Data from Grey 1972, pp. 230–231c

General characteristics

- Crew: one
- Length: 7.76 m (25 ft 5.5 in)
- Wingspan: 11.00 m (31 ft 6 in)
- Height: 2.7 m (8 ft 10 in)
- Wing area: 19.00 m^{2} (204 sq ft)
- Empty weight: 1,215 kg (2,673 lb)
- Gross weight: 1,650 kg (3,630 lb)
- Powerplant: 1 × I.A.R. 9KIc40 licence-built Gnome-Rhone 9Krse 9-cylinder supercharged radial, at 4,000 m (13,120 ft) , 450 kW (600 hp)

Performance

- Maximum speed: 375 km/h (233 mph, 202 kn) at 4,000 m (13,120 ft)
- Service ceiling: 10,500 m (34,400 ft)
- Rate of climb: 10.4 m/s (2,050 ft/min) to 5,000 m (16,400 ft)

Armament

- Two 7.7mm Vickers fixed machine guns firing through propeller

== See also ==
Aircraft of comparable role, configuration, and era

- Boeing P-26 Peashooter
- Dewoitine D.500
- Polikarpov I-16
