= IAR-22 =

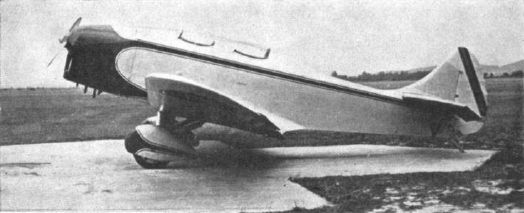
- IAR-22

General information
- Type: Basic trainer
- National origin: Romania
- Manufacturer: Industria Aeronautică Română (IAR), Brasov

History
- First flight: 1934

The IAR-22 was a single engine basic trainer built in Romania in about 1934. It was a low-wing monoplane with two seats in tandem and a fixed conventional undercarriage.

== Design ==
The IAR.22 was a wooden, low-wing monoplane with a fixed conventional undercarriage, seating two in tandem, open cockpits. The wings were built around two spruce box spars, with plywood webs; plywood covered the whole wing except for the fabric trailing edges. In plan, the wings were straight-tapered, with most of the taper on the trailing edge, but with rounded tips. The wing trailing edge carried ailerons but no flaps. The tailplane was also straight-tapered, though with the taper more equally distributed between leading and trailing edges. The elevators were split, with a cut-out for rudder movement, and were horn balanced. The fin was also straight-edged but the broad rudder, also horn balanced, had a curved trailing edge.

The fuselage of the IAR.22 was flat sided, tapering to the rear. It was a Warren truss structure with duralumin gussets; the forward fuselage was plywood covered, the remain fabric clad. Rounded decking, together with a head fairing behind the rear cockpit, gave the aircraft a slightly humped profile. The front cockpit was just behind the leading edge of the wing and the rear one at mid-chord. The nose line dropped slightly over the cowling of the 97 kW (130 hp) de Havilland Gipsy Major engine, an inverted air-cooled inline engine carried on a steel mounting and which drove a two-bladed propeller. The undercarriage had a wide track of over 2.5 m (100 in), with near perpendicular IAR-made shock absorber legs, split axles hinged at the fuselage centre line and trailing struts. The wheels had independent brakes but were not faired in.

It was reported that the IAR.22 "gave very satisfactory results in tests" conducted by the Romanian Air Ministry's Acceptance Commission. The design allowed for engines of up to 225 kW (300 hp) to be fitted: the intention was that it should be suitable for wireless, camera and gunnery training.

Two airplanes were manufactured, one of which was bought by the Royal Romanian Air Force and assigned to the Military Piloting School. It was withdrawn in 1935 following an accident. The other IAR-22 was bought by a private individual.

== Operators ==
Romania

- Royal Romanian Air Force

== Specifications ==
Data from Jane's all the World's Aircraft 1937, Romanian Aeronautical Constructions 1905–1974, Flight. 1934

General characteristics

- Crew: 2
- Length: 7.52 m (24 ft 8 in)
- Wingspan: 11.53 m (37 ft 10 in)
- Height: 2.02 m (6 ft 8 in)
- Wing area: 20.8 m^{2} (224 sq ft)
- Empty weight: 647 kg (1,426 lb)
- Gross weight: 880 kg (1,940 lb)
- Powerplant: 1 × de Havilland Gipsy Major 4-cylinder inverted air-cooled inline piston engine, 97 kW (130 hp)
- Propellers: 2-bladed fixed-pitch propeller

Performance

- Maximum speed: 193 km/h (120 mph, 104 kn) at sea level
- Stall speed: 73.73 km/h (45.81 mph, 39.81 kn)
- Range: 550 km (340 mi, 300 nmi)
- Service ceiling: 5,200 m (17,100 ft) service ceiling; 6,000 m (20,000 ft) absolute ceiling
- Rate of climb: 3.3 m/s (650 ft/min)
- Time to altitude: 1,000 m (3,300 ft) in 5 minutes 7 seconds

2,000 m (6,600 ft) in 11 minutes 6 seconds
3,000 m (9,800 ft) in 19 minutes 56 seconds

- Wing loading: 42.3 kg/m^{2} (8.7 lb/sq ft)
- Power/mass: 0.1103 kW/kg (0.0671 hp/lb)
