= List of aircraft (I) =

This is a list of aircraft in alphabetical order by manufacturer which begin with "I".

== I ==
=== IA ===
Prefixes used by aircraft designed or manufactured at the FMA/FAdeA:

Ae, for "Dirección General de Aerotécnica", 1927–1936);
F.M.A., for "Fábrica Militar de Aviones", (1938–1943);
I.Ae., for "Instituto Aerotécnico", (1943–1952);
IA, meaning not specified, (1952–2007).

- DINFIA IA 24
- DINFIA IA 25 : assault glider
- DINFIA IA 28 :twin-engined fighter based on IA-24 with Rolls-Royce Merlin engines.
- DINFIA IA 31
- DINFIA IA 32 :two-seat trainer aircraft
- DINFIA IA 35 Huanquero
  - DINFIA IA 35 Type 1A
  - DINFIA IA 35 Type 1U
  - DINFIA IA 35 Type II
  - DINFIA IA 35 Type III
  - DINFIA IA 35 Type IV
  - DINFIA Constancia II
  - DINFIA Pandora
  - DINFIA IA 35 Guaraní I
- DINFIA IA 38 Naranjero
- DINFIA IA 45 Querandi
- DINFIA IA 46 Ranquel
- FMA IA 50 Guaraní II
- DINFIA IA 51 Tehuelche
- DINFIA IA 53 Mamboretá
- FMA IA 54 Carancho
- FMA IA 58 Pucará
- FMA IA 66 Pucará
- FMA IA 63 Pampa

=== IABSA ===
(Industria Aeronáutica Brasileira SA)

- IABSA Premier 64-01
- IABSA Aerobatic 65-02

=== IAC ===
(International Aeromarine Corporation)

- IAC TA16 Seafire

=== IAE ===
(Institute of Aerospace Engineering - Vsoké Učeni Techniké Brně - (Brno University of Technology))

- IAE VUT Marabou

=== I.Ae. ===
(Instituto Aerotécnico)

known as Ae (from "Dirección General de Aerotécnica") 1927–1936, "Fábrica Militar de Aviones" (FMA) 1938–1943, I.Ae (for "Instituto Aerotécnico") 1943–1952, and IA from 1952 to 2007.

- FMA 20 El Boyero
- FMA 21
- I.Ae. 22 DL
- I.Ae. 23
- I.Ae. 24 Calquín
- I.Ae. 25 Mañque
- I.Ae. 26 D-600
- I.Ae. 27 Pulqui I
- I.Ae. 28 D-710
- I.Ae. 29 D-720
- I.Ae. 30 Ñancú (Ñamcú ?)
- I.Ae. 31 Colibrí
- I.Ae.32 Chingolo
- I.Ae. 33 glider 1:1 scale
- I.Ae. 33 Pulqui II
- I.Ae. 34 Clen Antú
- I.Ae. 35 Huanquero
- I.Ae. 36 Cóndor
- I.Ae. 37P
- I.Ae. 37
- I.Ae. 38 Naranjero
- I.Ae. 39
- I.Ae. 40
- IA-41 Urubú
- IA-43 Pulqui III
- IA 44 Super DL
- I.Ae. 45 Querandí
- I.Ae. 46 Ranquel

=== IAI ===
(Israeli Aircraft Industries)

- IAI AMIT Fouga
- IAI Arava
- IAI Astra
- IAI C-38 Courier
- IAI Commodore Jet
- IAI F-21 Kfir
- IAI Galaxy
- IAI Harpy
- IAI Heron
- IAI 1121 Jet Commander
- IAI Kfir
- IAI Lavi
- IAI Nesher
- IAI Phalcon
- IAI Pioneer
- IAI Scout
- IAI Seascan
- IASI Shahal
- IAI Westwind
- IAI Nammer
- IAI EL/W-2085

=== IAMI ===
(Iran Aircraft Manufacturing Industrial Company)

- IAMI Azarakhsh
- IAMI Dorna
- IAMI Iran-140
- IAMI Paratsu
- IAMI Project 2061
- IAMI Project 2091
- IAMI Shahed 274
- IAMI Shahed 278
- IAMI Shafagh
- IAMI Shavabiz
- IAMI Simorgh
- IAMI Tazarv

=== Iannotta ===
(Orlando Iannotta later Voliamo)

- Iannotta I-66 San Francesco
- Iannotta I-66L San Francesco 2
- Iannotta I-96 San Francesco 3

=== IAIO ===
(Iran Aviation Industries Organization)

- IAIO Toofan I
- IAIO Toofan II

==== IAR ====
(Industria Aeronautică Română)

- IAR Ag 6
- IAR CV 11
- IAR-12
- IAR-13
- IAR-14
- IAR-15
- IAR-16
- IAR-21
- IAR-22
- IAR-23
- IAR-24
- IAR 27
- IAR-36
- IAR 37
- IAR 38
- IAR 39
- IAR-46
- IAR 47
- IAR 79
- IAR-80
- IAR-81
- IAR-93 Vultur
- IAR 95
- IAR 99
- IAR-109
- IAR 316
- IAR 317
- IAR 330
- IAR-330L - Socat
- IAR 811
- IAR 813
- IAR 814
- IAR-817
- IAR-818
- IAR-821
- IAR-822
- IAR-823
- IAR-824
- IAR-825
- IAR-826
- IAR-827
- IAR-828
- IAR-831
- IAR MR-2

=== Iberavia ===
- Iberavia I-11
- Iberavia IP-2
- Iberavia IE-02

=== Ibis Aircraft ===
(Ibis Aircraft SA, Cali, Colombia)

- Ibis GS-240
- Ibis GS-450 Magic
- Ibis GS-501 Urraco
- Ibis GS-600 Arrow
- Ibis GS-700 Magic
- Ibis GS-710 Magic
- Ibis GS-730 Super Magic
- Ibis GS-750 Grand Magic

=== ICA-Brasov ===
(Întreprinderea de Construcții Aeronautice - Brașov)

- ICA IS-23
- ICA IS-28 "Lark"
- ICA IS-28M
- ICA IS-29
- ICA IS-30
- ICA IS-31
- ICA IS-32
- ICA IS-33

=== ICAR ===
(Întreprinderea de Construcții Aeronautice Românești)

- ICAR M.23b
- ICAR Universal Tourer
- ICAR Universal Aerobat
- ICAR Universal Trainer
- ICAR M.36 Comercial (sic)
- ICAR Acrobatic
- ICAR Turing
- ICAR 1 - Primary glider
- ICAR RO-2 - Radu Onciul
- ICAR F-10G (Fleet Model 10G)

=== Icaro 2000 ===
(Sangiano, Italy)

- Icaro Bip
- Icaro Laminar
- Icaro Mars
- Icaro MastR
- Icaro Orbiter
- Icaro Pit-Trike
- Icaro Relax
- Icaro RX2
- Icaro RXB
- Icaro Stratos
- Icaro Twin Electric

=== Icarus ===
- Icarus Aeneas

=== Icarus Foundation ===
(Bucharest, Romania)

- Icarus F99 Rambo

=== Ichimori ===
(Yoshinori Ichimori)

- Ichimori 1919 Monocoque Aeroplane
- Ichimori Skylark
- Ichimori Tractor

=== Icon ===
(Icon Aircraft (founders: Kirk Hawkins, Steen Strand), Los Angeles, CA)

- Icon A5

=== ICP srl ===
(Castelnuovo Don Bosco, Italy)

- ICP Amigo
- ICP Bingo
- ICP Savannah
- ICP Vimana

=== ICRMA ===
(Întreprinderea de Reparat Material Aeronautic)

- IAR 818

=== Idea Aircraft ===
(Idea Aircraft Company, Miskolc, Hungary)

- Idea Hydropteron

=== IFB Stuttgart ===
(Universität Stuttgart - Institut für Flugzeugbau )

- e-Genius
- Icaré 2

=== IFIL ===
(Întreprinderea Forestieră de Industrializare a Lemnului - Reghin)

- IFIL RM-1 - (Vladimiir Nowițchi)
- IFIL RG-1 - (Vladimiir Nowițchi)
- IFIL RG-2 - (Vladimiir Nowițchi)
- IFIL RG-3 - (Vladimiir Nowițchi)
- IFIL RG-4 Pionier - (Vladimiir Nowițchi)
- IFIL RG-5 Pescăruș - (Vladimiir Nowițchi)
- IFIL RG-6 - (Vladimiir Nowițchi)

=== IFTHB ===
(Institut für Flugzeugbau an der Technischen Hochschule Braunschweig)

- Braunschweig Zaunkönig

=== Iga ===
(Ujihiro Iga)

- Iga Maitsuru-go

=== IIL ===
(Întreprinderea de Industrie Locală - Ghimbav)

- IIL IS-5 - Iosif Șilimon
- IIL IS-8 - Iosif Șilimon
- IIL IS-10 - Iosif Șilimon
- IIL IS-12 - Iosif Șilimon
- IIL IS-13 - Iosif Șilimon
- IIL IS-18 - Iosif Șilimon
- IIL IS-18/25 - Iosif Șilimon

=== IK ===
(Ilmailuinsinöörien Kerho - Aeronautical Engineers Club)

- IK Viri

=== Ikar Aero Club ===
- Ikar Ai-9 Lis
- Ikar Ai-10 Ikar

=== Ikarus ===
(Tvornica Aero i Hydroplana Ikarus - Ikarus aeroplane and hydroplane factory)

- Ikarus 211
- Ikarus 212
- Ikarus 213
- Ikarus 214
- Ikarus 215
- Ikarus 231
- Ikarus 232 Pionir
- Ikarus 251
- Ikarus 252 Prvi Maj
- Ikarus 451
- Ikarus 452
- Ikarus 453
- Ikarus P-453-MW
- Ikarus 522
- Ikarus 920
- Ikarus Aero 2
- Ikarus Aero 3
- Ikarus IK 2
- Ikarus IM - reconnaissance flying boat (1920s)
- Ikarus IO - reconnaissance flying boat (1927)
- Ikarus Košava
- Ikarus Kurir
- Ikarus Kurir H - reconnaissance and utility floatplane (1957)
- Ikarus Meteor
- Ikarus Orkan
- Ikarus Prvi maj
- Ikarus S-49
- Ikarus SM - biplane flying boat (1920s)
- Ikarus Trojka
- Ikarus MM-2

=== Ikarus ===
(Ikarus Drachen Thomas Pellicci, Stephanskirchen, Germany)

- Ikarus Funflyer
- Ikarus Doppel
- Ikarus Duo Club
- Ikarus Grasshopper
- Ikarus Imagine
- Ikarus Spirit L

=== Ikarus ===
(Comco Ikarus)

- Ikarus 500
- Ikarus Sherpa
- Ikarus C22
- Ikarus C42
- Ikarus C52

=== Ilmailuinsinöörien Kerho ===
(Club of Aeronautical Engineers)

- IK Viri

=== Ilyushin ===
- Ilyushin BSh-2 initial prototype for the Il-2
- Ilyushin DB-3 long-range bomber
- Ilyushin DB-4 prototype long-range bomber
- Ilyushin I-21 prototype single engine, single-seat fighter
- Ilyushin MSh
- Ilyushin Il-1 prototype armored fighter
- Ilyushin Il-2 ground attack aircraft
- Ilyushin Il-4 bomber/torpedo bomber developed from the DB-3
- Ilyushin Il-6 ground attack aircraft project developed from the Il-2; cancelled due to the Il-8 and Il-10
- Ilyushin Il-8 ground attack aircraft prototype developed from the Il-2; intended Il-2 replacement
- Ilyushin Il-10 two-seat ground attack aircraft developed from the Il-1
- Ilyushin Il-12 twin-engine cargo/military transport aircraft
- Ilyushin Il-14 high-speed bomber project
- Ilyushin Il-14 twin engine airliner/military transport aircraft
- Ilyushin Il-16 ground attack aircraft prototype developed from the Il-10
- Ilyushin Il-16 four-engine jet airliner, resembled the Tu-110; cancelled due to the Tu-104
- Ilyushin Il-18 prototype four-engine airliner
- Ilyushin Il-18 four-engine turboprop airliner
- Ilyushin Il-20 ground attack prototype, intended as a Il-10 replacement
- Ilyushin Il-20 ELINT/radar reconnaissance version of Il-18
- Ilyushin Il-22 jet bomber prototype
- Ilyushin Il-22 airborne command post version of Il-18
- Ilyushin Il-24 prototype four-engine jet bomber
- Ilyushin Il-24 twin-engine jet bomber; derivative of Il-22
- Ilyushin Il-24 ice reconnaissance aircraft
- Ilyushin Il-26 long-range bomber project
- Ilyushin Il-28 medium bomber/trainer
- Ilyushin Il-30 tactical swept wing bomber prototype developed from the Il-28
- Ilyushin Il-32 prototype cargo glider
- Ilyushin Il-34 proposed motorized version of Il-32
- Ilyushin Il-36 long-range, high-altitude reconnaissance aircraft project
- Ilyushin Il-38 bomber project
- Ilyushin Il-38 maritime patrol/ASW aircraft developed from the Il-18
- Ilyushin Il-40 prototype jet-powered ground attack aircraft
- Ilyushin Il-42 ground-attack aircraft project developed from the Il-40; lost to the Sukhoi T-8
- Ilyushin Il-46 jet bomber prototype developed from the Il-30
- Ilyushin Il-54 supersonic bomber prototype; cancelled due to the Yak-25
- Ilyushin Il-56 front-line bomber
- Ilyushin Il-58 carrier-based attack aircraft, Tu-91 competitor
- Ilyushin Il-60 four-engine military transport; lost to the An-22
- Ilyushin Il-62 long-range narrow-body jet airliner
- Ilyushin Il-64 twin-engine turboprop airliner, proposed Il-14 replacement; cancelled in favor of the Il-62
- Ilyushin Il-66 (supersonic airliner project 1959)
- Ilyushin Il-66 (military transport project early 1960s)
- Ilyushin Il-70 (first short-haul airliner project 1961)
- Ilyushin Il-70 (second short-haul airliner project 1961)
- Ilyushin Il-70 (AEW aircraft project 1969)
- Ilyushin Il-72 (supersonic airliner project 1961)
- Ilyushin Il-72 (trijet medium-haul airliner project 1964)
- Ilyushin Il-74 trijet airliner project, enlarged Il-72 and Tu-154 competitor; lost to the Tu-154
- Ilyushin Il-76 strategic airlifter
- Ilyushin Il-78 airborne refueling variant of the Il-76
- Ilyushin Il-80 airborne command and control aircraft developed from the Il-86
- Ilyushin Il-82 twin-engine airliner, proposed Tu-134 replacement; cancelled in favor of the Tu-134
- Ilyushin Il-82 internal designation for the A-50
- Ilyushin Il-84 search and rescue variant of the Il-76
- Ilyushin Il-86 medium-range wide-body jet airliner
- Ilyushin Il-87 airborne command post version of the Il-86
- Ilyushin Il-88 transport aircraft project; cancelled due to the An-70
- Ilyushin Il-90 proposed long-haul airliner
- Ilyushin Il-96 long-haul wide-body jet airliner developed from the Il-86
- Ilyushin Il-100 light multipurpose aircraft project
- Ilyushin Il-102 experimental jet-powered ground attack aircraft
- Ilyushin Il-103 light trainer
- Ilyushin Il-106 proposed heavy military transport; Il-76 replacement
- Ilyushin Il-108 business jet project
- Ilyushin Il-112 light military transport
- Ilyushin Il-114 turboprop regional airliner
- Ilyushin Il-116 regional propliner project
- Ilyushin Il-118 proposed twin propfan version of Il-18
- Ilyushin Il-126 proposed business jet
- Ilyushin Il-140 AWACS version of Il-114
- Ilyushin Il-196 long-range, high-capacity airliner project
- Ilyushin Il-276 medium-lift military transport
- Ilyushin Il-476 internal designation for the Il-76MD-90A

=== IML Group ===
- IML Addax

=== IMAM ===
(Meridionali - IMAM - Industrie Meccaniche e Aeronautiche Meridonali)

- See Meridionali

==== IMPA ====
(Industrias Metalúrgicas y Plasticas Argentinas S.A.)

- IMPA RR-11
- IMPA Tu-Sa-O
- IMPA Chorlito

==== Impuls ====
(Impuls Flugdrachen GmbH, Munich, Germany)

- Impuls 14
- Impuls 17
- Impuls IC

=== Inagaki ===
(Yasuji Inagaki)

- Inagaki Tractor

=== Indaer Peru ===
- Indaer Peru Chuspi
- Indaer Peru IAP-002 Ag-Chuspi

=== Independence Paragliding ===
(Eisenberg, Germany)

- Independence Air Taxi
- Independence Akron
- Independence Avalon
- Independence Cruiser
- Independence Draco
- Independence Dragon
- Independence Duet
- Independence Geronimo
- Independence Pioneer
- Independence Raptor
- Independence Speed Tandem
- Independence Sportster
- Independence Striker
- Independence T-Fighter
- Independence Trainer
- Independence Zippy PT

=== Indonesian Aerospace and its precursors ===
(PT Dirgantara Indonesia (DI) - (IAe) Indonesian Aerospace)

==== AURI ====
(Angkatan Udara Republik Indonesia, Depot Penjelidikan, Pertjobaan dan Pembuatan - Indonesian Air force research, development, and production depot)

- NU-200 Sikumbang
- NU-225 Sikumbang (X-09)
- NU-260 Sikumbang (X-02)
- Belalang 85 (X-03)
- Belalang 90
- NU-25 Kunang
- Super Kunang 35 (X-05 and X-07)
- Kindjeng 150 (X-06)
- B-8m Kolentang2

==== LIPNUR ====
(Lembaga Industri Penerbangan Nurtanio - Nurtanio Aviation Industry Body)

- LIPNUR LT-200 Angkatang (Pazmany PL-2)
- LIPNUR Nu-90 Belalang
- LIPNUR Kindjeng
- LIPNUR Kolentang
- LIPNUR Kumbang
- LIPNUR Kunang-kunang
- LIPNUR Manyang
- LIPNUR Sikumbang
- LIPNUR Super Kunang I
- LIPNUR Super Kunang II

==== Nurtanio ====
- Nurtanio Nu-200
- CASA-Nurtanio CN-235

==== Indonesian Aerospace ====
- NC 212, a licensed production of CASA C.212 Aviocar aircraft.
- Indonesian Aerospace N-219
- Indonesian Aerospace N-2130
- Indonesian Aerospace CN-235 Civil, Military, and Maritime Version (Joint Development with CASA).
- Indonesian Aerospace N-245
- Indonesian Aerospace N-250
- NAS 330J, a licensed production of Aérospatiale Puma helicopter.
- NAS 332, a licensed production of Eurocopter Super Puma helicopter.
- NBell 412, a licensed production of Bell 412 helicopter.
- NBO 105, a licensed production of Bölkow Bo 105 helicopter.

==== IPTN ====
(Industri Pesawat Terbang Nusantara or Industri Pesawat Terbang Nurtanio)

- IPTN C-212
- IPTN CN-235
- IPTN N-250
- IPTN N-2130
- IPTN NAS-330 J
- IPTN NAS-332
- IPTN NBell-412
- IPTN NBO-105

=== Indraéro ===
(Sociétè Indraéro)

- Indraéro Aéro 101
- Indraéro Aéro 110
- Indraéro Aéro 20
- Indraéro Aéro 30

=== Indy Aircraft ===
(Indy Aircraft Limited, Independence, IA)

- Indy T-Bird I
- Indy T-Bird II

=== Infinity Power Chutes ===
(Bronson, Michigan)

- Infinity Challenger
- Infinity Commander
- Infinity Purple

=== Ingam-foster ===
(Texas Aeroplane Co (founders: Jay Ingram, Charles A Foster), Decatur, TX)

- Ingam-Foster 1914 Biplane

=== Inland ===
(Inland Aviation Co (Pres: Arthur Hardgrave), 14 St and Minnesota Ave, Kansas City, KS)

- Inland S-100 (55 hp Velie M-5 engine)
- Inland S-200 (55 hp Velie M-5 engine)
- Inland S-300 Sport (65 hpLe Blond 5D engine)
- Inland R-400 Sportster (90 hp Warner engine)
- Inland S-400 (110 hp Warner Scarab engine)
- Inland W-500 Super Sport (110 hp Warner Scarab engine)
- Inland W-600 Super Sport (145 hp Warner Scarab engine)
- Inland T (145 hp Warner Scarab engine)

=== Innovator ===
(Innovator Technologies)

- Innovator Mosquito Air

=== Insitu ===
- Insitu Aerosonde
- Insitu GeoRanger
- Insitu Insight
- Boeing ScanEagle - In Partnership with Boeing
- Insitu NightEagle
- Insitu Integrator On July 30, 2010 it was reported that Insitu won the STUAS Tier II contract with its Integrator product.

=== INTA ===
(Instituto Nacional de Tecnica Aeronautica - national institute of aeronautics)

- INTA HM.1
- INTA HM.2
- INTA HM.3
- INTA HM.5
- INTA HM.7
- INTA HM.9

=== Interavia ===
(Interavia Konstruktorskoye Buro AO — Russia)

- Interavia I-1
- Interavia CR-90
- Interavia I-3
- Interavia SP-91
- Interavia I-5

=== Interceptor ===
(1968: Interceptor Corp, Norman, OK, c. 1973: Interceptor Co, Boulder, CO)

- Interceptor 400

=== International ===
(International Aircraft Corp organized from Catron & Fisk, Santa Monica, CA)

- International F-10 Triplane (a.k.a. CF-10 Triplane)
- International F-16 Violet
- International F-17 Sportsman
- International F-18 Air Coach

=== International ===
(International Aircraft Corp organized from Catron & Fisk, Santa Monica CA)

- International Duckling

=== International Helicopters ===
- International Helicopters Commuter II

=== International Ultralight ===
(International Ultralight Aviation)

- International Ultralight Banchee

=== InterPlane ===
(InterPlane Aircraft sro, Zbraslavice, Czech Republic)

- InterPlane Griffon
- InterPlane Skyboy
- InterPlane Starboy
- InterPlane ZJ-Viera

=== Interstate ===
(Interstate Aircraft Company)

- Interstate Arctic Tern

=== Interstate ===
(Interstate Aircraft & Engineering Corp (Pres: Donald White), El Segundo, CA)
Cadet airplanes:

- Interstate S-1 Cadet (modern production as the Arctic Tern)
- Interstate L-6 Cadet
- Interstate L-8 Cadet
- Interstate O-63 Cadet

TDR drones:

- Interstate BQ-6A
- Interstate TDR-1 (main production run)
- Interstate TD3R-1
- Interstate XTDR-1
- Interstate XTD2R-1
- Interstate XTD3R-1
- Interstate XTD3R-2
- Interstate XBQ-4
- Interstate XBQ-5
- Interstate XBQ-6

XBDR jet-powered drone:

- Interstate XBDR

=== Invincible ===
(Invincible Metal Furniture Co, Aircraft Div (Pres: John A Schuette), Manitowoc, WI)

- Invincible 1929 Monoplane
- Invincible 200
- Invincible Center-Wing
- Invincible D-D

=== Iomax ===
- Iomax ArchAngel

=== Ion ===
(Ion Aircraft)

- Ion Aircraft Ion
- Ion Aircraft Ion 100
- Ion Aircraft Ion 105
- Ion Aircraft Ion 120

==== IPAI ====
(Instituto de Pesquisas AI - Industrial Development and Research Institute (University of São Paulo))

- IPAI-26 Tuca
- IPAI-27 Jipe Vaodor
- IPAI-28 Super Surubim
- IPAI-29 Tira Prosa
- IPAI-30

==== IPD ====
(Instituto de Pesquisas e Desenvolvimento English:Research and Development Institute (University of São Paulo))

- IPD-6504
- I.P.D BF-1 Beija-Flor

=== IPE ===
(Industria Paranaense de Estruturas)

- IPE 04
- IPE 06 Curucaca

==== IPT ====
(Instituto de Pesquisas Technologicas de Sao Paulo (University of São Paulo) includes gliders)

- IPT-0 Bichinho
- IPT-01 Gafanhoto
- IPT-02 Aratinga
- IPT-03 Saracura
- IPT-4 Planalto
- IPT-05 Jaraguá
- IPT-06 Stratus
- IPT-7 Junior
- IPT-8
- IPT-9
- IPT-10 Junior
- IPT-11 Bichão
- IPT-12 Caboré
- IPT-13
- IPT-14
- IPT-15
- IPT-16 Surubim
- IPT-17

=== Irbitis ===
(Karlis Irbitis)

- Data from:
- Irbitis Gambija - K.Irbitis (for N.Pulins)
- Irbitis-Backman I.4 Vanadzins - K.Irbitis / A.S.Christine Backman
- Irbitis I-1
- Irbitis I-2
- Irbitis I-4
- Irbitis I-5 Ikars II
- Irbitis I-6 Gambija
- Irbitis I-7 Zilais Putns
- Irbitis I-8 Zilais Putns II - N.Pulins / K. Irbitis
- Irbitis I-9 Vanags / Valsts Daugavpils Arodskola
- Irbitis I-12 – K. Irbitis - 2-seater, later converted to single-seater
- Irbitis I-14
- Irbitis I-15a
- Irbitis I-15b
- Irbitis I-16
- Irbitis I-17
- Pulins-Irbitis P.2 Spriditis (I.1) – N.Pulins & K.Irbitis
- Pulins-Irbitis P.3 Ikars (I.2) – N.Pulins & K.Irbitis

=== Ireland ===
((G Sumner) Ireland Aircraft Inc, Curtiss Field, Garden City NY)

- Ireland Amphibion
- Ireland Amphiplane
- Ireland Comet (a.k.a. Curtiss-Ireland Comet)
- Ireland Meteor
- Ireland N-1B Neptune
- Ireland N-2B Neptune
- Ireland N-2C Neptune
- Ireland N-2D Neptune
- Ireland ND-5
- Ireland ND-6
- Ireland P-1
- Ireland P-2 Privateer
- Ireland P-3 Privateer

=== IRI ===
(Italian Rotors Industries)

- IRI T250A
- IRI T22B

=== IRGC ===
(Iranian Revolutionary Guard Corps)

- IRGC Shahed 274

=== IRMA ===
(Intreprinderea de Reparat Material Aeronautic)

- IAR 818H
- IAR 821
- IAR 822
- IRMA BN-2 Islander

=== Irwin ===
(Irwin Aircraft Co, 126 O St, Sacramento, CA)

- Irwin 44
- Irwin C-C-1 Meteorplane
- Irwin C-C-2 Meteorplane
- Irwin FA-1 Meteorplane
- Irwin Gray Eagle
- Irwin LW-3
- Irwin M-T Meteorplane
- Irwin M-T-1
- Irwin M-T-2 (a.k.a. SP-1)

=== Irwin ===
(Gus Irwin (or Irvin?), 507 S Russell, Pampa, TX)

- Irwin 1931 Monoplane

=== Isaac ===
(Archibald C. J. Isaac, Pittsfield, MA)

- Isaac 1926 monoplane

=== Isaacs ===
John O. Isaacs, United Kingdom

- Isaacs Fury
- Isaacs Fury II
- Isaacs Spitfire

=== Isaacson ===
- Isaacson 104

=== Isacco ===
(Vittorio Isacco)

- Isacco I-1 Helicogyr
- Isacco I-2 Helicogyr
- Isacco-Saunders I-3 Helicogyr
- Isacco I-4 Helicogyr

=== ISAE ===
(Integrated Systems Aero Engineering (Pres: Brent Brown), UT)

- IASE Omega 2

=== Ishibashi ===
(Katsunami Ishibashi)

- Ishibashi SPAD XIII Racing Aircraft

=== Ishikawajima ===
(KK Ishikawajima Hikoki Seisakusho - Ishikawajima Aeroplane manufacturing Co. Ltd.)

- Ishikawajima T-2 Experimental Reconnaissance Aircraft
- Ishikawajima T-3 Experimental Reconnaissance Aircraft
- Ishikawajima CM-1 Experimental Trainer
- Ishikawajima R-1 Experimental Trainer Red Dragonfly
- Ishikawajima R-2 Experimental Trainer
- Ishikawajima R-3 Trainer
- Ishikawajima R-5 Experimental Trainer

=== Island ===
(Island Aircraft Corp (Pres: LeRoy LoPresti), no location.)

- Island X-199 Spectra

=== Isobe ===
(Onokichi Isobe)

- Isobe 1910 Seaplane
- Isobe No.2
- Isobe Rumpler Taube

=== ISON ===
- ISON Airbike

=== Israel ===
(Gordon Israel, Los Angeles, CA)

- Israel Redhead

=== Issoire ===
Issoire Aviation, France

- Issoire APM 20 Lionceau
- Issoire APM 30 Lion
- Issoire APM 40 Simba

=== Issoudun ===
(Issoudun Aircraft Corp, Northville, MI)

- Issoudun H-23

=== IST ===
(Philippines Institute of Science and Technology)

- I.S.T. L-10 Balang
- I.S.T. XL-14 Maya
- I.S.T. XL-15 Tagak
- I.S.T. L-17 Musang
- I.S.T. L-21S Flying Vinta

=== Istra ===
(Istra Experimental Mechanics Depot)

- Istra Ezhik

=== ITA ===
(Instituto Tecnològicas Aeronáutica)

- ITA Panelinha

=== Italair ===
- Italair F.20 Pegaso

=== ITBA ===
(Aeroitba, Instituto Tecnológico de Buenos Aires, ITBA)

- Petrel 912i

=== Itoh ===
(Itoh Aeroplane Research Studio)

- Itoh Emi 1
- Itoh Emi 2
- Itoh Emi 3
- Itoh Emi 5
- Itoh Emi 6
- Itoh Emi 9
- Itoh Emi 11 Ground Taxi-ing Trainer
- Itoh Emi 12 Trainer
- Itoh Emi 13 Trainer
- Itoh Emi 14 Long-range Aeroplane
- Itoh Emi 16 Racing Aeroplane
- Itoh Emi 17 Tsurubane Aerobatic Aeroplane
- Itoh Emi 18
- Itoh Emi 19
- Itoh Emi 20
- Itoh Emi 22 Yamagatakinen-go Long-range Aeroplane
- Itoh Emi 23 Bulldog Trainer
- Itoh Emi 24 Akita-go Long-range Aeroplane
- Itoh Emi 25 Trainer
- Itoh Emi 28 Flying Boat
- Itoh Emi 29
- Itoh Emi 30
- Itoh Emi 31 Flying Boat
- Itoh Emi 50 Sport Aeroplane
- Itoh Tsurubane No.1
- Itoh Tsurubane No.2 Aerobatic Aeroplane

=== ITV Parapentes ===
(Épagny, Haute-Savoie, France)

- ITV Asterion
- ITV Awak
- ITV Billy
- ITV Bip Bip
- ITV Boxer
- ITV Bulldog
- ITV Dakota
- ITV Diamant
- ITV Dolpo
- ITV Fury
- ITV Jedi
- ITV Meteor
- ITV Opale
- ITV Papoose
- ITV Pawnee
- ITV Polaris
- ITV Proxima
- ITV Shakra
- ITV Siam
- ITV Stewart Tandem
- ITV Tepee
- ITV Thanka
- ITV Tomahawk
- ITV Tsampa
- ITV Turquoise
- ITV Vega

=== Istra ===
- Istra Ezhik

=== Ivanov Aero ===
(Hradec Králové, Czech Republic)

- Ivanov ZJ-Viera

=== IVL ===
(Ilmailuvoimien Lentokonetehdas- Air Force Aircraft Factory)

- IVL A.22 Hansa
- IVL C.24
- IVL C.VI.25
- IVL D.26 Haukka I
- IVL D.27 Haukka II
- IVL K.1 Kurki
- IVL E.30 Kotka
- Caudron C.60

=== Izaki ===
(Shozo Izaki / Sempu Hiko gakko - Sempu flying School)

- Izaki No.2 Sempu-go
