= Ion Ion =

Ion Ion may refer to:

- Ion Ion (footballer), a former Romanian footballer
- Ion Aircraft Ion, a two-seat, twin boom, pusher configuration light aircraft
