= IAR-827 =

Romanian agricultural aircraft

IAR-827 and IAR-828
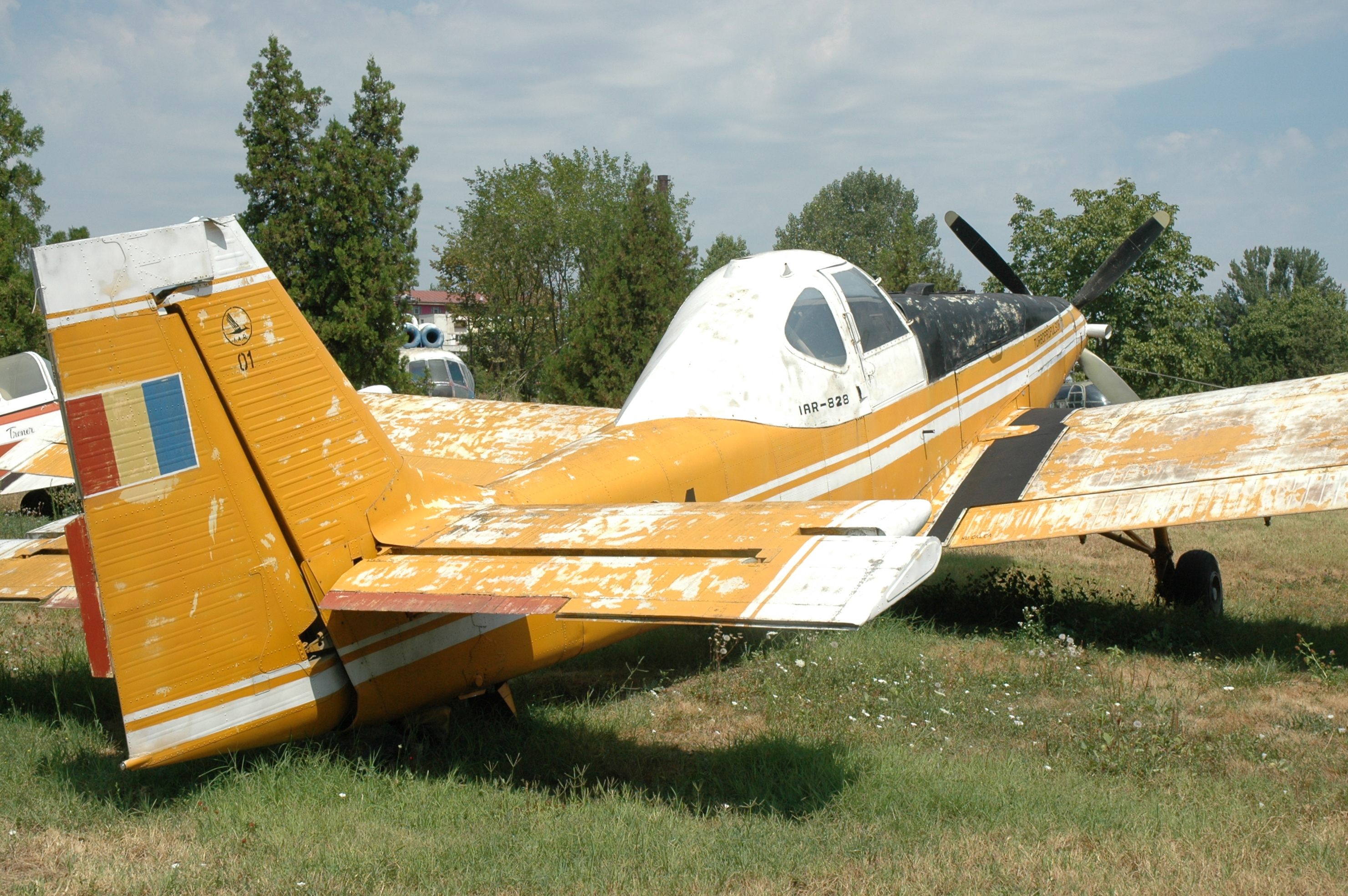

General information
- Type: Agricultural aircraft
- National origin: Romania
- Manufacturer: IAR
- Designer: Radu Manicatide
- Number built: 17

History
- First flight: 22 July 1976

The IAR-827 was an agricultural aircraft built in Romania in the 1970s and 1980s. The penultimate member of the family of designs that began with the IAR-821, it was, like the others, a conventional low-wing monoplane with fixed, tailwheel undercarriage, and shared the all-metal construction of the IAR-826. The prototype flew in 1976, powered by a Lycoming IO-720 engine, but the production examples that followed all had the PZL-3S.

In 1981, the IAR-827 prototype was re-engined with a Pratt & Whitney Canada PT6A turboprop and redesignated first as the IAR-827TP and later as the IAR-828. Plans to produce the aircraft either with the Pratt & Whitney Canada engine or a Walter 601 never materialised.

== Variants ==
- IAR-827 - prototype with Lycoming IO-720 engine
- IAR-827A - production version with PZL-3S engine
- IAR-827TP, later IAR-828 - turboprop version with Pratt & Whitney Canada PT6A-15AG

== Specifications (IAR-827A) ==
Data from Jane's All The World's Aircraft 1982–83

General characteristics

- Crew: 1 pilot
- Capacity:
  - 1,200 L (320 US gal; 260 imp gal) liquid chemicals or
  - 800 kg (1,800 lb) dry chemicals
- Length: 8.80 m (28 ft 10 in)
- Wingspan: 14.00 m (45 ft 11 in)
- Height: 2.60 m (8 ft 6 in)
- Wing area: 29.40 m^{2} (316.5 sq ft)
- Aspect ratio: 6.67:1
- Airfoil: NACA 23015
- Empty weight: 1,660 kg (3,660 lb)
- Gross weight: 2,800 kg (6,173 lb)
- Fuel capacity: 460 L (120 US gal; 100 imp gal)
- Powerplant: 1 × PZL-3S 7-cylinder air-cooled radial engine, 450 kW (600 hp)
- Propellers: 4-bladed PZL US132000-A constant speed metal, 2.62 m (8 ft 7 in) diameter

Performance

- Maximum speed: 210 km/h (130 mph, 110 kn)
- Cruise speed: 135–180 km/h (84–112 mph, 73–97 kn) (operating speed range)
- Stall speed: 110 km/h (68 mph, 59 kn) (power off, 10 degree flaps)
- Range: 350 km (220 mi, 190 nmi) with maximum fuel
- Endurance: 2 hr 30 minutes
- Service ceiling: 3,500 m (11,500 ft)
- Rate of climb: 4.50 m/s (885 ft/min)
