= Itoh Emi 30 =

1920s Japanese biplane aircraft

Emi 30

General information
- Type: Sports biplane
- National origin: Japan
- Manufacturer: Itoh Aeroplane Research Studio
- Number built: 1

History
- First flight: 1922

The Itoh Emi 30 was a small, single-engined, sports biplane built in Japan in 1922. Though it attracted attention by being the smallest Japanese aircraft of its time, the sole example was mostly used as an aerobatics trainer.

== Design and development ==
When it was first displayed in 1922 the Emi 30, a single seat civil sports aircraft, was the smallest aircraft in Japan. After World War I Itoh had followed design developments in both Europe and the US and had explored these trends with their own designs. The Emi 29, which enclosed its two passengers in a cabin, was the first Japanese design to follow the limousines of the west. The Emi 30 was the first Japanese aircraft influenced by a western interest in small sports aircraft.

The Emi 30 had a wooden structure and was fabric-covered. It was a single bay biplane with wings braced by parallel pairs of streamlined interplane struts. The lower wing, which had a slightly greater span than the upper one, was mounted on the lower fuselage longerons and the centre section of the upper wing was held over the fuselage by outward leaning, parallel cabane struts from the upper longerons. The two spar wings had thick airfoil profiles compared to most contemporary biplanes. There were inset ailerons on the upper wing.

It was powered by an Itoh built, 40–45 hp (30–34 kW) radial engine. The Itoh 11 used the cylinders and pistons from a Japanese-built Renault engine, joined to a new crankshaft and crankcase. Its two-bladed propeller had a domed spinner. The Emi 30 was flown from an open cockpit under the upper wing, with a streamlined headrest which merged into a slender rear fuselage. The tail was conventional, with a tailplane mounted on top of the fuselage and braced from below, and a generous fin and balanced rudder with an overall rounded but pointed profile.

The Emi 30's landing gear had wheels on a single axle, its ends supported by V-struts from the lower fuselage longerons.

== Operational history ==
It was first seen in public at an exhibition in July 1922, where it was awarded a silver plaque for innovation. The date of the first flight is not known but it was developed in a program flown by Seizo Okhura and later used as an aerobatics trainer by the newly renamed Itoh Aeroplane Manufacturing Works. In March 1924 it was displayed on the roof of a Tokyo department store where it was on sale for 5,000 yen but its later history is not known. There is no firm evidence that more than one was built.

== Specifications ==
Data from Japanese Aircraft 1910-1941

General characteristics

- Crew: one
- Length: 5.11 m (16 ft 9 in)
- Wingspan: 5.80 m (19 ft 0 in)
- Height: 2.10 m (6 ft 11 in)
- Wing area: 13 m^{2} (140 sq ft)
- Empty weight: 295 kg (650 lb)
- Gross weight: 605 kg (1,334 lb)
- Powerplant: 1 × Itoh 11 , 34 kW (45 hp)
- Propellers: 2-bladed

Performance

- Maximum speed: 130 km/h (81 mph, 70 kn)
- Endurance: 2 hr
