= Itoh Emi 29 =

1920s Japanese biplane aircraft

Emi 29 Taihoku-go

General information
- Type: Passenger transport
- National origin: Japan
- Manufacturer: Itoh Aeroplane Research Studio
- Designer: Tomotari Inagaki
- Number built: 1

History
- First flight: 1923

The Itoh Emi 29 Taihoku-go was a 1920s Japanese civil transport with its two passengers in an enclosed cabin. It was the first of this "limousine" type to be built in Japan; the only example flew the Osaka-Tokyo route for a while.

== Design and development ==
The 1923 Taihoku-go (Taipei) was given its name since it was built to an order from Wen-Ta Shie, a pilot from Taiwan which was then under Japanese rule. It was the first Japanese-designed civil aircraft to enclose its passengers in a cabin, limousine style. Such aircraft had been developed in Europe soon after the end of World War I with conversions of war surplus machines, though luxurious accommodation for more passengers was provided in purpose-built types like the Westland Limousine as early as 1919. Generally the pilot was separated from the passengers or raised above them, in an open cockpit.

The Emi 29 was a two bay biplane with wooden-structured, fabric-covered wings braced by parallel pairs of interplane struts and a short, parallel-strutted central cabane. Its ailerons, fitted to both upper and lower wings, were externally interconnected.

It was powered by a 220 hp (160 kW) Hispano-Suiza 8B water-cooled V-8 engine. This had rectangular, side-on radiators just behind the engine, as on the earlier Itoh Emi 14 and Emi 16, and fuel tanks in and above the central upper wing. The pilot's cockpit was ahead of, but separated from, an enclosed two seat passenger cabin glazed above the upper fuselage longerons and dropping away behind. The flat-sided fuselage was plywood-covered to the rear of the cabin and fabric-covered aft. The tail was conventional, with the tailplane and balanced elevators mounted on top of the fuselage and with a fin and balanced rudder of triangular profile.

The Emi 29's wide track, fixed undercarriage was also conventional with mainwheels, on a single axle between V-struts from the lower fuselage longerons, and a tailskid.

== Operational history ==
The Taihoku-go was operated by Tozai Teiki Kokukai on their Tokyo-Osaka service but was not heavily used.

== Specifications ==
Data from Japanese Aircraft 1910-1941

General characteristics

- Crew: One
- Capacity: Two passengers
- Length: 7.25 m (23 ft 9 in)
- Wingspan: 10.50 m (34 ft 5 in)
- Height: 3.15 m (10 ft 4 in)
- Wing area: 31 m^{2} (330 sq ft)
- Empty weight: 870 kg (1,918 lb)
- Gross weight: 1,710 kg (3,770 lb)
- Powerplant: 1 × Hispano-Suiza 8B water-cooled V8, 160 kW (220 hp)
- Propellers: 2-bladed wooden

Performance

- Maximum speed: 141 km/h (87 mph, 76 kn)
