= Itoh Emi 31 =

1920s Japanese flying boat aircraft

Emi 31

General information
- Type: Civil passenger transport flying boat
- National origin: Japan
- Manufacturer: Itoh Aeroplane Research Studio
- Designer: Tomotari Inagaki
- Number built: 1

History
- First flight: late summer 1922
- Developed from: Curtiss Model F via unbuilt Emi 28

The Itoh Emi 31 was a one-off Japanese civil flying boat first flown in 1922. Operated by an airline on a scheduled route for two years apart from a short break serving a newspaper, it could carry up to three passengers.

== Design and development ==
The development of the Emi 31 began in 1922 when the fledgling Japan Air Transport Research Society bought a Curtiss Seagull flying boat as their first passenger aircraft, intended for a service between Tokyo and Yokohama Bay. This was seriously damaged before it could be delivered so the airline's founders, Sun-ichi Bando and Yukichi Goto who had earlier owned the Emi 16 racer, turned to Itoh for a replacement flying boat. In response Tomotari Inagaki designed the Itoh Emi 28, which was strongly influenced by the Seagull and powered by a 150 hp (110 kW) Hispano-Suiza engine, but this design was never built. Another passenger company, Choichi Inoue's Japanese Air Transport Research Association (JATRA) that had provided Japan's first regular airline service using floatplanes between Sakai to Takamatsu and Tokushima, was looking for a suitable passenger flying boat. Aware of the Emi 28 he placed an order for a more powerful development, resulting in the Emi 31.

The Emi 31 was a wooden-structured, pusher configuration biplane. Its unequal span, fabric covered, two bay wings were braced by parallel pairs of interplane struts. The shorter lower wing was mounted on top of the hull and the upper centre section, high above the water, was strengthened by the struts that supported the pusher engine. There were ailerons on the upper wings.

Its 220 hp (160 kW), pusher configuration, water-cooled V-8 Hispano-Suiza 8B engine was pylon-mounted just below the upper wing with two long, upright, rectangular radiators mounted edge-on ahead of the upper leading edge. The Emi 31's plywood-covered hull was essentially the same as that of the single step Seagull. On the water it was stabilized by small, strongly up-pitched floats mounted below the outer interplane struts. It had two open, side-by-side seat cockpits in tandem. Initially the pilot and flight engineer occupied the forward cockpit with two passengers behind but in service the engineer was often displaced by a third passenger.

The Emi 31's fabric-covered tail was also similar to that of the Curtiss, with a tailplane and elevator held well clear of the water on top of an abbreviated fin. Its large, comma-profile rudder moved in a deep elevator cutout and had a forward balance area overhanging the tailplane.

== Operational history ==
The Emi 31 was completed in mid-1922. The date of its first flight is not known but, after test flights at Itoh's Tsudanuma base, it went to the JATRA base at Sakai to fly the planned route. It was also used by The Asahi Shimbun newspaper to report army manoeuvres, catching the attention of the Prince Regent. There were frequent, poorly recorded modifications; after only a few months of use it had been significantly improved twice. It remained in use with JATRA into 1924, after which it was retired to the water surface, further modified for use as a water taxi and sightseeing-boat.

== Specifications ==
Data from Japanese Aircraft 1910-1941

General characteristics

- Crew: one, with option of a flight engineer
- Capacity: three, or two with engineer
- Length: 7.65 m (25 ft 1 in)
- Wingspan: 14.66 m (48 ft 1 in)
- Height: 3 m (9 ft 10 in)
- Wing area: 26 m^{2} (280 sq ft)
- Empty weight: 780 kg (1,720 lb)
- Gross weight: 1,350 kg (2,976 lb)
- Powerplant: 1 × Hispano-Suiza 8B water-cooled V-8, 160 kW (220 hp)
- Propellers: 2-bladed wooden

Performance

- Maximum speed: 121 km/h (75 mph, 65 kn)
- Endurance: 2 hr 30 min
