= I.S.T. L-17 =

L-17 Masang

General information
- Type: Touring and training aircraft
- National origin: Republic of the Philippines
- Manufacturer: Institute of Science and Technology, Manila
- Designer: Antonio J. de Leon
- Number built: 1?

History
- First flight: May 1956?

The I.S.T. L-17 Masang was a two-seat, single engine, low wing monoplane aircraft designed and built in the Philippine Republic in the mid-1950s. It was intended for both touring and training.

== Design and development ==
In the mid-1950s the Philippine Institute of Science and Technology (I.S.T.) designed aircraft to explore the possibilities of local aircraft production from indigenous materials. The single engine, tricycle undercarriage, low wing monoplane L-17 was one of them.

Its wing was a single-piece wooden structure with 5° of dihedral and a straight-tapered plan. It was plywood-covered and had split flaps inboard of the ailerons. The cantilever tail unit was similarly constructed with the straight-tapered horizontal surfaces on top of the extreme aft fuselage; the single-piece elevator carried an offset trim tab. The vertical tail was tall and straight-edged; the bottom of the horn balanced rudder was above the elevator and just aft of its hinge, with a small cut-out to allow for elevator deflection.

The L-17's fuselage was a plywood-skinned wooden semi-monocoque, the cockpit seating two side by side under a single piece canopy. A 108 hp (80 kW) Lycoming O-235 flat-four engine drove a two-blade propeller. The fixed tricycle undercarriage had rearward-sloping oleo legs mounted to the wings, giving a track of 2.40 m (7 ft 10 in).

The first flight of the L-17 was scheduled for May 1956.

== Specifications ==
Data from Jane's All the World's Aircraft 1956-57, Jane's All the World's Aircraft 1958-59

General characteristics

- Crew: 2
- Length: 7.20 m (23 ft 7 in)
- Wingspan: 9.60 m (31 ft 6 in)
- Height: 3.20 m (10 ft 6 in)
- Wing area: 13.40 m^{2} (144.2 sq ft)
- Aspect ratio: 6.85
- Airfoil: root: US 35B; tip:NACA 23012
- Empty weight: 510 kg (1,124 lb)
- Gross weight: 735 kg (1,620 lb)
- Fuel capacity: 68 L (18 US gal; 15 imp gal)
- Powerplant: 1 × Lycoming O-235-C1 4-cylinder air-cooled horizontally opposed piston engine, 81 kW (108 hp)
- Propellers: 2-bladed fixed pitch wooden propeller

Performance

- Maximum speed: 210 km/h (130 mph, 110 kn)
- Cruise speed: 175 km/h (109 mph, 94 kn)
- Landing speed: 80 km/h (50 mph; 43 kn) (flaps down)
- Rate of climb: 3.83 m/s (754 ft/min)
