= Indraéro Aéro 20 =

Aéro 20

General information
- Type: Light aircraft
- National origin: France
- Manufacturer: Indraéro SA, Argenton sur Creuse
- Designer: Jean Chapeau
- Number built: 2

History
- First flight: 11 June 1966

The Indraéro Aéro 20 is a small, two-seat, single-engined monoplane, built in France in the mid-1960s, for general and sports flying. Only one was built, but this remains active.

== Design and development ==
Design work on the Aéro 20 began in June 1965 and construction started in that September. It first flew on 11 June 1966 and received its amateur category SGAC certification in August 1968.

It is a conventional single-engine low-wing monoplane, seating two in tandem. The wings are wooden structures with fabric covering. They carry 5° of dihedral and are braced with struts running from the upper fuselage longerons to the upper wing surface. There are no flaps. The tail surfaces are also built of wood, with fabric covering. The fin and rudder are tall, tapered and straight edged. The elevators carry trim tabs.

The fuselage of the Aéro 20 is flat sided, with wooden longerons and frames, plywood covered and with a rounded decking. The two seats, with a small baggage space behind were originally enclosed under a continuous canopy. The aircraft was originally powered by a 48 kW (65 hp) Simson, which was later replaced with a 90 hp (60 kW) Continental C90-8 flat 4-cylinder engine. The fixed, tailwheel undercarriage has spring steel shock absorber main legs with a track of 2.44 m (8 ft); no brakes are fitted.

== Operational history ==
Two Aéro 20 were built, one for each boss of Indraéro, Chapeau and Blanchet. One was destroyed but Chapeau's (no.1, F-PKXY) remains on the French register in 2014 and is still active. The canopy was discarded and replaced in the 1980s by a pair of small windscreens and the wheels enclosed in spats. It won the RSA award for the best restoration of classic planes in 1982.

== Specifications ==
Data from Jane's All the World's Aircraft 1970-71

General characteristics

- Capacity: 2
- Length: 6.00 m (19 ft 8 in)
- Wingspan: 8.75 m (28 ft 8 in)
- Height: 2.60 m (8 ft 6 in)
- Wing area: 10.60 m^{2} (114.1 sq ft) gross
- Empty weight: 317 kg (699 lb)
- Max takeoff weight: 516 kg (1,138 lb)
- Powerplant: 1 × Continental C90-8 4-cylinder horizontally opposed air-cooled, 67 kW (90 hp)
- Propellers: 2-bladed Merville Type 929, 1.82 m (6 ft 0 in) diameter

Performance

- Maximum speed: 220 km/h (140 mph, 120 kn)
- Cruise speed: 170 km/h (110 mph, 92 kn)
- Range: 500 km (310 mi, 270 nmi)
- Service ceiling: 3,600 m (11,800 ft)
- Rate of climb: 5 m/s (980 ft/min)
