= Întreprinderea de Construcții Aeronautice Românești =

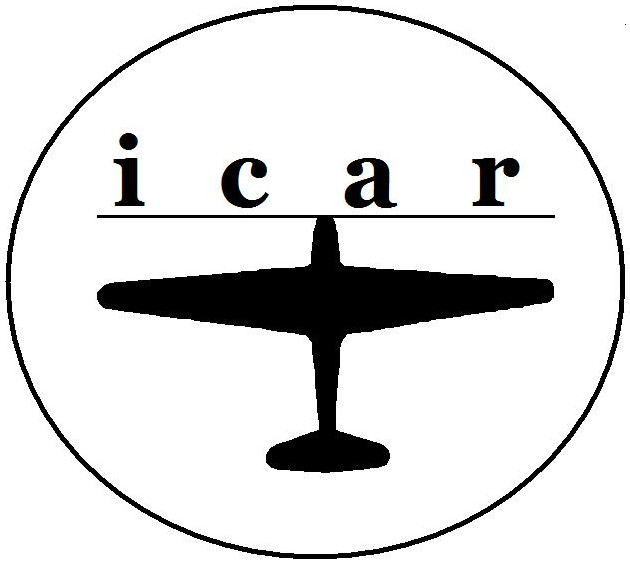
- Industry: Aerospace
- Founded: 1932
- Founder: Mihail Racoviță
- Defunct: 1951
- Headquarters: Bucharest, Romania
- Key people: Nicolae Racoviță

Întreprinderea de Construcții Aeronautice Românești (ICAR, also icar) (Romanian Aeronautical Design Enterprise), was a Romanian aircraft manufacturer. The company produced aircraft of its own design and under license.

== History ==
Întreprinderea de Construcții Aeronautice Românești was founded in Bucharest in 1932 by Mihail Racovitd. In 1938, it was planned to rename the company Uzinele I.C.A.R. — Societate Anonimă and move it to Transylvania. However, this never occurred. ICAR closed in the early 1950s and production transitioned to the manufacture of industrial fans.

== Aircraft ==
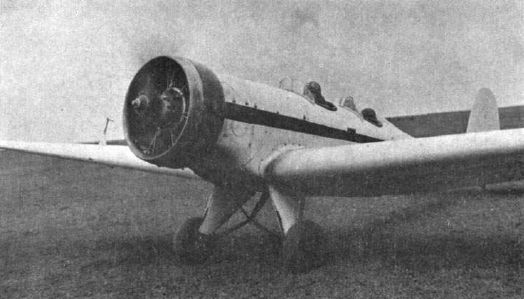
ICAR Universal

Model name	First flight	Number built	Type
ICAR M23		14	Single engine monoplane touring airplane
ICAR Universal	1934	14	Single engine monoplane trainer
ICAR Comercial	1934	1	Single engine monoplane airliner
ICAR Acrobatic	1936	3	Single engine biplane acrobatic airplane
ICAR Turing	1937	2	Single engine monoplane touring airplane
ICAR-1	1942	250	License built Schneider Grunau 9 primary glider. Production ended in 1955.
ICAR F-10G		210	License built single engine biplane trainer
Fieseler Fi 156 Storch		80	License built single engine monoplane liaison airplane

== See also ==
- Industria Aeronautică Română (IAR)
- Societatea Pentru Exploatări Tehnice (SET)
- Aviation in Romania
