= Ireland Privateer =

Privateer
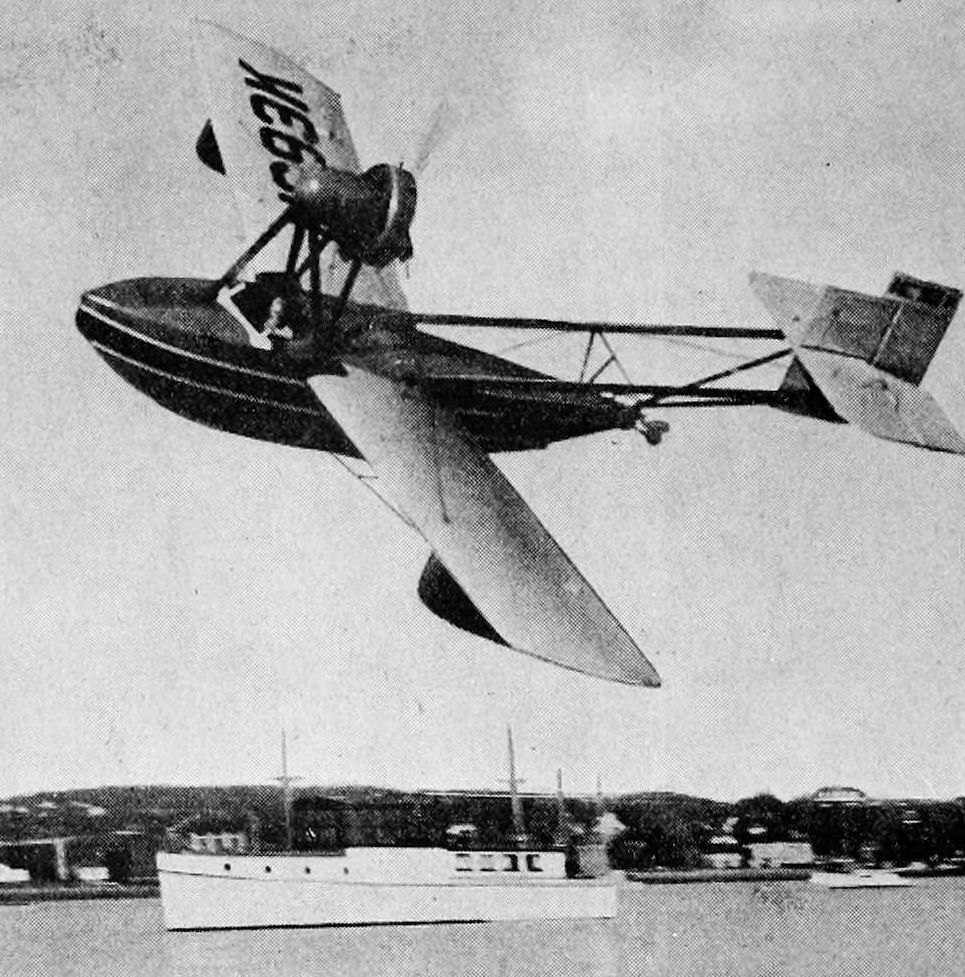
- P-2 Privateer with Warner Scarab engine

General information
- Type: Two seat sport aircraft
- National origin: United States
- Manufacturer: Ireland Aircraft, Inc., later renamed Amphibions, Inc
- Designer: T.P.Leaman
- Number built: about 18 including prototype

History
- First flight: early 1930

The Ireland Privateer was a 1930s American two-seat, single pusher-engined monoplane sports flying boat which could be equipped as an amphibian. About 18 were built.

== Design and development ==
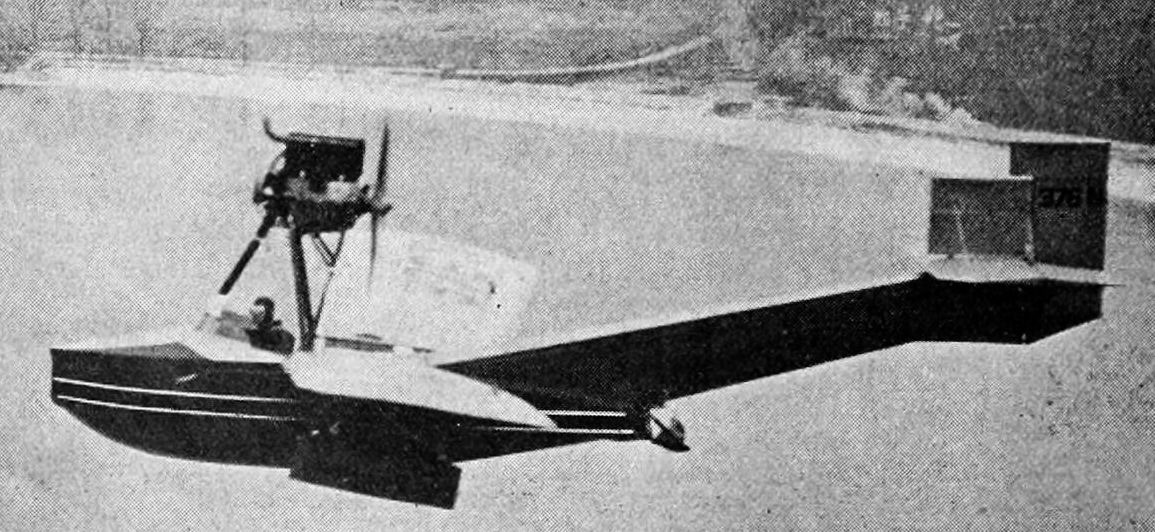
Privateer P-1 with Gypsy engine

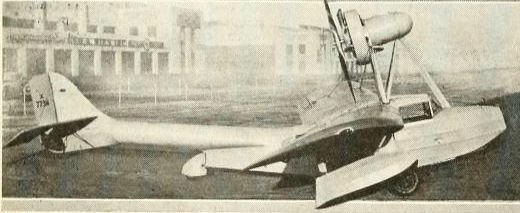
Privateer P-3

The two seat sportsplane's fuselage had two distinct parts, a forward boat hull containing the cockpit and mounting wings, engine and the land undercarriage on amphibious versions and a rear part bearing the tail. The hull had ash longerons with spruce stringers and was Alclad skinned. It was flat-bottomed with a single step under the wing, ending abruptly about halfway between the trailing edge and tail. At its rear it carried a steerable tailwheel/water rudder. An open cockpit, ahead of the wings, seated two side-by-side. Dual controls could be fitted for training.

The wings were mounted on top of the hull with 5° of dihedral, had blunted rectangular plans and were swept at 3.5°. They were built around spruce spars and alloy ribs and were fabric covered. Steel tube structured, canvas covered ailerons filled most of the trailing edges. A pair of flat-sided and -bottomed floats towards the wingtips provided stability on the water. These were replaced on the P-3 with better streamlined floats.

On the prototype (type P-1) the tail was held high above the water on an upward rising, triangular section, canvas covered fuselage or outrigger with a steel tube structure based on three longerons. It was replaced on the production P-2s by a pair of sloping, parallel booms, braced at the rear by a V-strut from the end of the hull. Both models had very similar rectangular rear surfaces, structurally similar to the ailerons, with braced tailplane and elevators. The fin and balanced rudder extended above and below the tailplane, the rudder moving in an elevator cut-out. The Privateer could be trimmed in-flight by tailplane incidence adjustment. The last, more powerful model, the P-3, appeared early in 1932 with major revisions to the fuselage and tail. The open, two seat cockpit of the earlier models was replaced with an enclosed cabin for three. The rear fuselage, like that of the P-1, was a single piece structure but slimmer and more rounded than that of its predecessor, and the rectangular rear surfaces of earlier models were replaced with blunted triangular fin and tailplane.

The Privateers were powered by a pusher configuration engine, placed above the wing with the propeller rotating at about one quarter of the chord back from the wing's leading edge. The engine was attached to the hull with a V-strut on each side and a single, central forward strut. The position minimized the effects of spray and simplified servicing, as the whole mount and engine together could, apart from its fuel tank in the hull, be moved into the workshop with the mount acting as a stand. It also made it easy to fit different engines. The P-1 was originally offered with either an 85–100 hp (63–75 kW) Wright Gypsy, a licence-built de Havilland Gipsy four cylinder, upright, air-cooled inline engine, or a 90 hp (67 kW) Le Blond 90 (type 7D) 7 cylinder radial engine. The P-2 had a tidily enclosed 110 hp (82 kW) Warner Scarab, the P-3 a 165 hp (123 kW) Continental A-70 and the P-3B a 210 hp (160 kW) Continental W-670, all 7 cylinder radials.

The date of the Privateer's first flight is not known but flight tests were underway in the spring of 1930 and the P-2 was flying in late 1930. The P-3 followed in 1932. As the Great Depression deepened Ireland Aircraft built about 12 P-2s. Though only one aircraft was built as a P-3, five P-2s were re-engined with the Continental radial. Four P-3Bs were built. Sometime in 1930 Ireland Aircraft restructured into Amphibions, Inc.

== Variants ==
P-1
Prototype with conventional rear fuselage, with either a 90 hp (67 kW) Le Blond 90 or Wright Gypsy engine. One only.
P-2
Production aircraft with 110 hp (82 kW) Warner Scarab radial engine and twin boom rear fuselage. About 12 were built.
P-3
Three-seater cabin version introduced in 1932 with 165 hp (123 kW) Continental A-70 radial engine. Greater span (42 ft 5 in (12.93 m)) and longer (30 ft (9.1 m)), with slender, single boom fuselage and refined, more rounded tail . One built, plus five P-2 conversions.
P-3B
Three-seater as P-3 with 210 hp (160 kW) Continental R-670 radial engine. Four built.

== Specifications (Ireland P-2 Privateer flying boat) ==
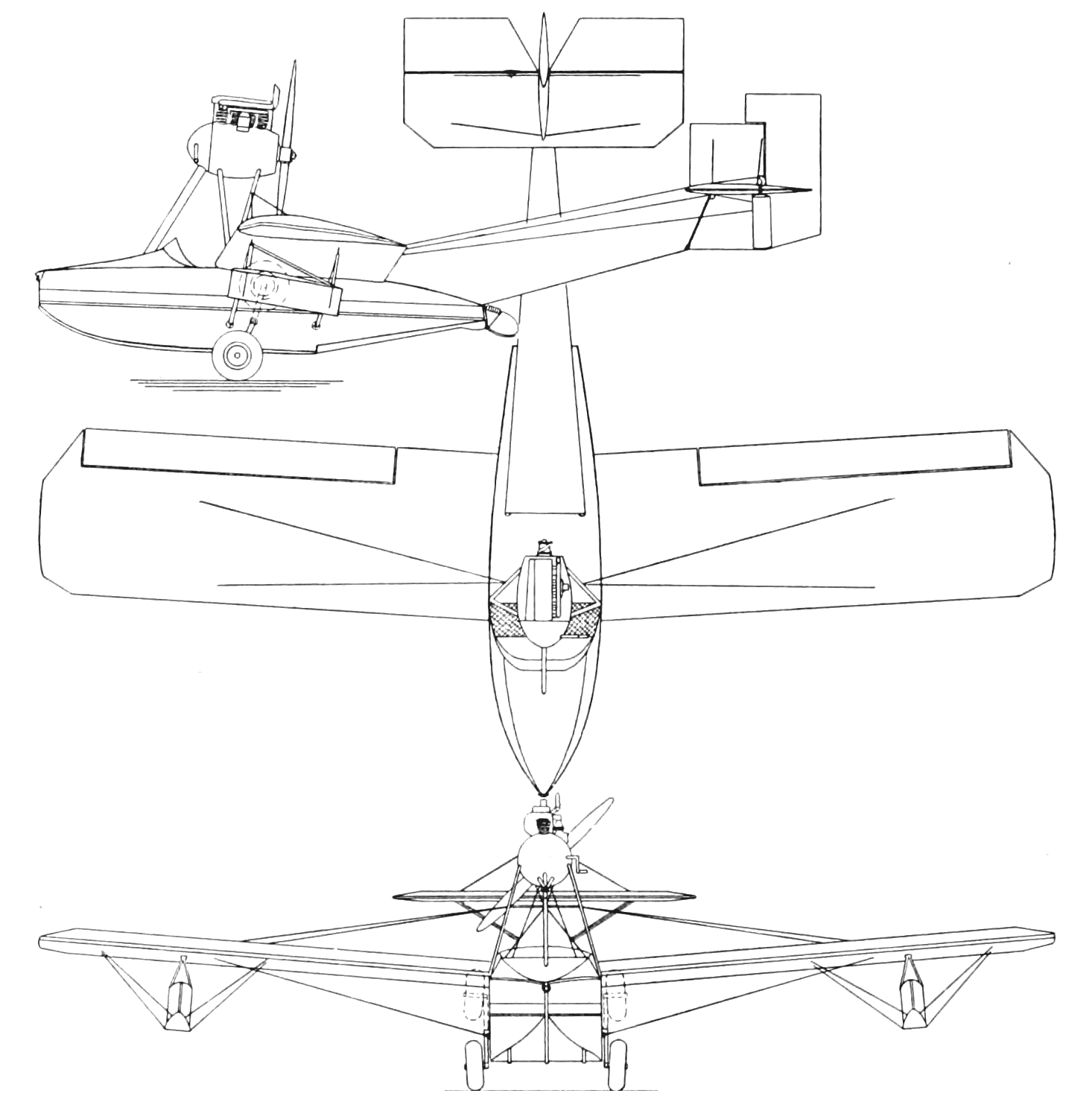
Privateer P-1 3-view drawing

Data from Aero Digest

General characteristics

- Crew: one
- Capacity: one passenger
- Length: 28 ft (8.5 m)
- Wingspan: 38 ft (12 m)
- Height: 8 ft 4 in (2.54 m)
- Wing area: 198 sq ft (18.4 m^{2})
- Empty weight: 1,450 lb (658 kg)
- Gross weight: 2,100 lb (953 kg)
- Fuel capacity: 30 US gal (25 imp gal; 110 L)
- Powerplant: 1 × Warner Scarab S-50 7 cylinder radial engine, 110 hp (82 kW)
- Propellers: 2-bladed Flotorp

Performance

- Maximum speed: 95 mph (153 km/h, 83 kn)
- Cruise speed: 75 mph (121 km/h, 65 kn)
- Landing speed: 42 mph (68 km/h)
- Range: 260 mi (420 km, 230 nmi)
- Service ceiling: 10,000 ft (3,000 m)
- Rate of climb: 550 ft/min (2.8 m/s)
