= ICAR Universal =

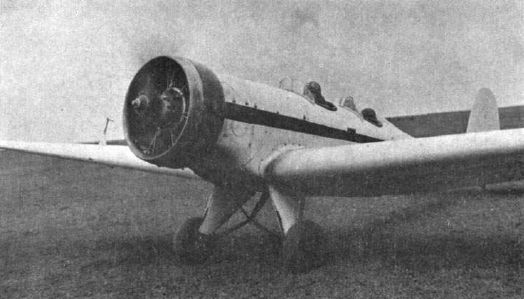

General information
- Type: Trainer aircraft
- Manufacturer: ICAR
- Primary user: Romania
- Number built: 14

History
- Manufactured: 1934-1936
- First flight: 1934

The ICAR Universal (I.C.A.R. Universal) was a 1930s Romanian two seat monoplane trainer, touring and aerobatics aircraft.

== Design and development ==
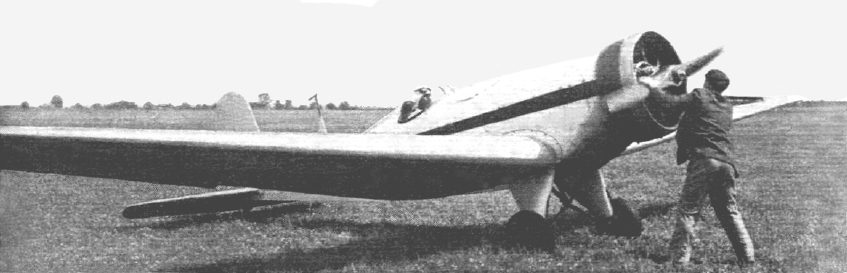
ICAR Universal YR-CCI of prince Constantin Soutzo.

The Universal was designed in 1932, led by engineer Mihail Racoviță, and manufactured in 1934 in the factory of ICAR (Īntreprinderea de construcţii aeronautice româneşti) in Bucharest. It was modeled after the German Messerschmitt M.23b, license — produced by the ICAR. There were three variants of the aircraft. The first was a long-distance single-seater sports aircraft, powered with 150 HP Siemens-Halske Sh 14 radial engine under NACA cowling, giving it a maximum speed of 180 km/h. One such aircraft (YR-MAI) was built for Princess Marina Stirbey. In a place of a forward cockpit, there was an additional fuel tank, giving it an endurance of 6 hours. In the late 1930s, it was converted to two-seater touring aircraft.

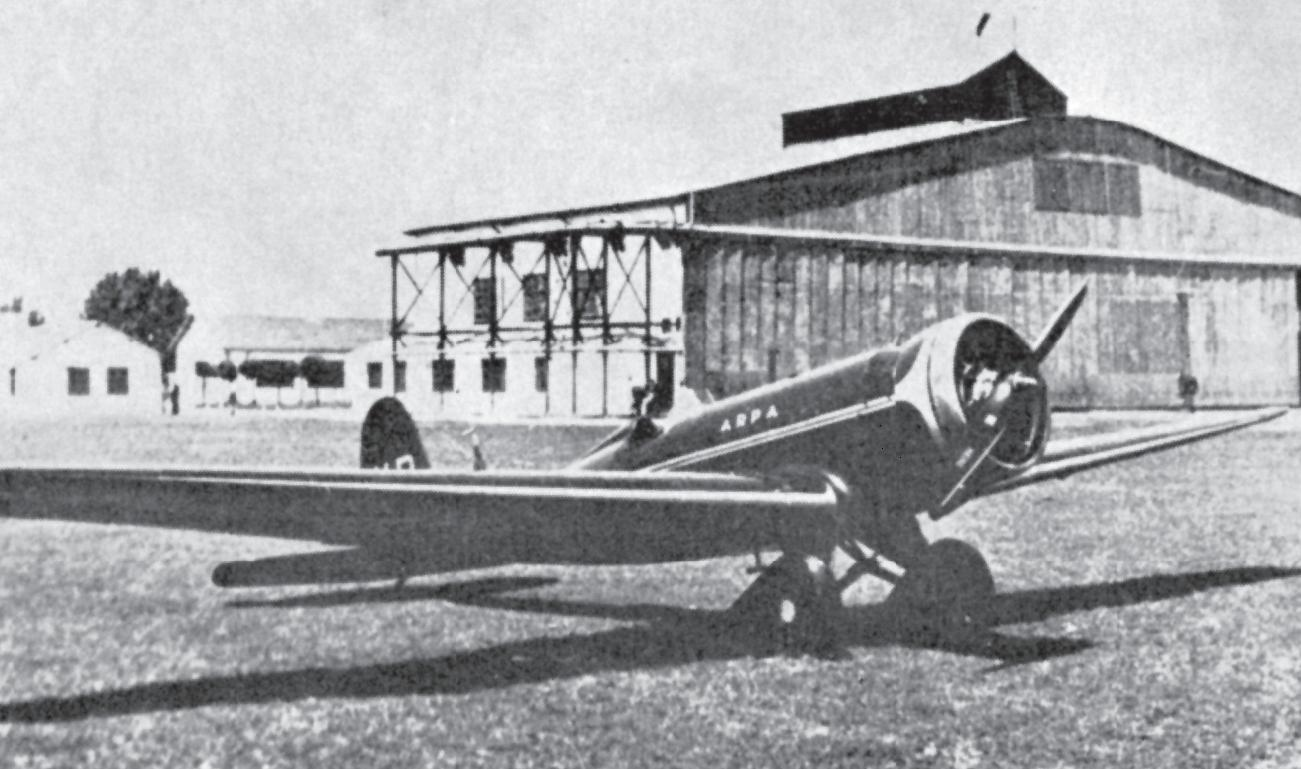
ICAR Universal Acrobatic

A further three aircraft were built in a single-seater aerobatics variant, ICAR Universal Acrobatic (YR-ACA, YR-ACB, YR-ACC). They had wing span increased to 12.9 m, and were powered by a Sh.14a radial engine under a NACA cowling.

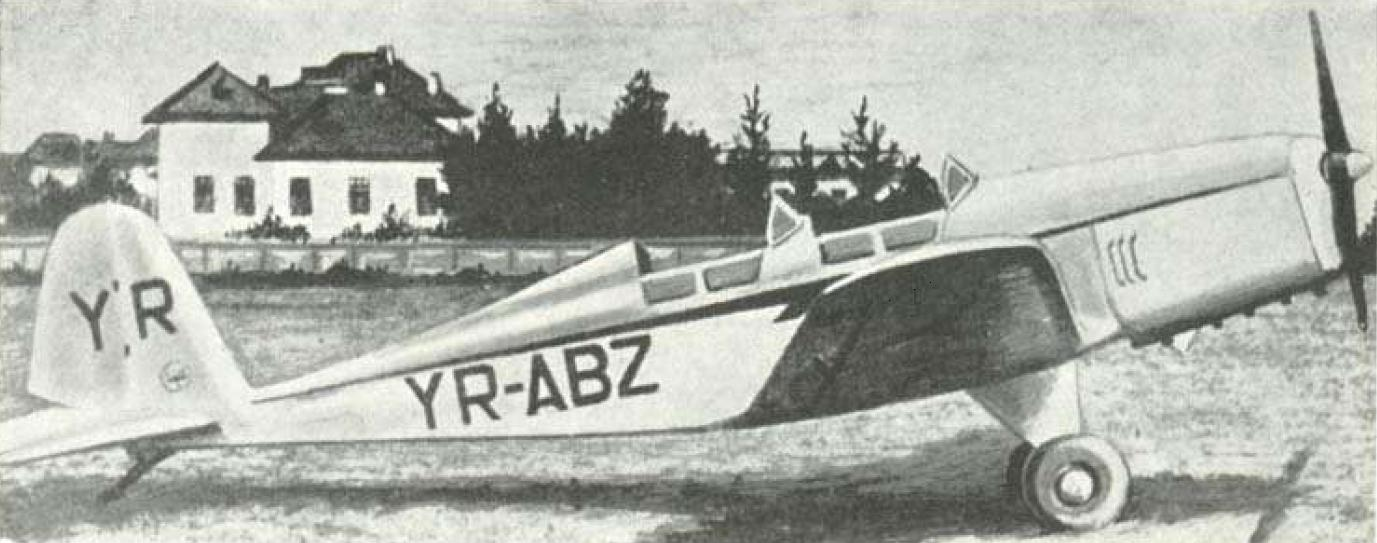
ICAR Universal Biloc

Following the success of the single-seaters, a small series of 10 two-seat trainers was built, also known as ICAR Universal Biloc (="two-seater"). This variant was powered by a 150 HP de Havilland Gipsy Major inline engine, manufactured under licence at Braşov as the IAR 4GI. They were produced in 1935–1936.

== Operational service ==
During August–September 1936, the long-range Universal (YR-MAI) was used by Marina Stirbey for a solo flight on the Bucharest-Tallinn-Helsinki-Copenhagen-Berlin-Bucharest route. Later, it was converted to two-seater.

From 1934, three Universal Acrobatics, painted red, were used in a famous Romanian prewar aerobatics team Dracii Roșii (Red Devils, pilots were Petre Ivanovici, Mihail Pantazi and Maximilian "Max" Manolescu). They performed at numerous air shows in 1934–1937. It remained the most successful aerobatics aircraft built in Romania for a long time.

Most examples of Universal Biloc were used for training. They received military serial numbers 1 to 10, painted in white, but later some were given civilian registrations. Between April 14 and May 25, 1935, military pilots Alexandru Cernescu, Mihail Pantazi, George Davidescu, Gheorghe Olteanu, Gheorghe Jienescu and Anton Stengher flew three modified Universal Bilocs (YR-ACL, YR-AEL, YR-AEY) in a flight from Bucharest to Cape Town and back (23,000 km) in 149 hours 10 minutes of flight time. Endurance of these modified aircraft was increased from 3 to 8.5 h.

== Description ==
The Universal was a low-wing cantilever monoplane, with a fixed tail-skid landing gear trapezoidal, plywood skinned wings with rounded tips and fabric coveredailerons. The fuselage was a wooden framed, plywood covered semi-monocoque, with the forward fuselage covered with metal sheet. The standard aircraft had one or two open cockpits in tandem, each with an individual windscreen and the Universal Biloc had glass windows in the cockpit sides, to improve visibility below. Power was provided by a 97 kW (130 hp) IAR 4GI in-line engine in the Universal Biloc, or 110 kW (148 hp) Siemens-Halske Sh 14 radial engine, with NACA cowling, driving a two-blade fixed-pitch propeller. In the aerobatics variant, the main landing gear had teardrop spats.

== Variants ==
Universal
standard utility / sport / trainer aircraft.
Universal Acrobatic
aerobatic competition and training aircraft.
Universal Biloc
Trainer also used in long-distance record-breaking flights.

== Operators ==
Romania

== Specifications ==
General characteristics

- Crew: 1
- Capacity: 1
- Length: 6.9 m (22 ft 8 in)
- Wingspan: 11.9 m (39 ft 1 in)
- Height: 1.95 m (6 ft 5 in)
- Wing area: 14.3 m^{2} (154 sq ft)
- Empty weight: 465 kg (1,025 lb)
- Gross weight: 710 kg (1,565 lb)
- Powerplant: 1 × Siemens-Halske Sh 14 7-cylinder air-cooled radial piston engine, 110 kW (150 hp)

or 97 kW (130 hp) IAR 4GI (Gipsy Major built under license)

- Propellers: 2-bladed

Performance

- Maximum speed: 180–195 km/h (112–121 mph, 97–105 kn)
- Cruise speed: 160 km/h (99 mph, 86 kn)
- Service ceiling: 5,500 m (18,000 ft)

== See also ==
Related development

- Messerschmitt M.23

Aircraft of comparable role, configuration, and era

- Miles Hawk Major
- Klemm Kl 25
- Yakovlev UT-2
