= Ikar Ai-10 Ikar =

Ukrainian ultralight monoplane

Ai-10 Ikar
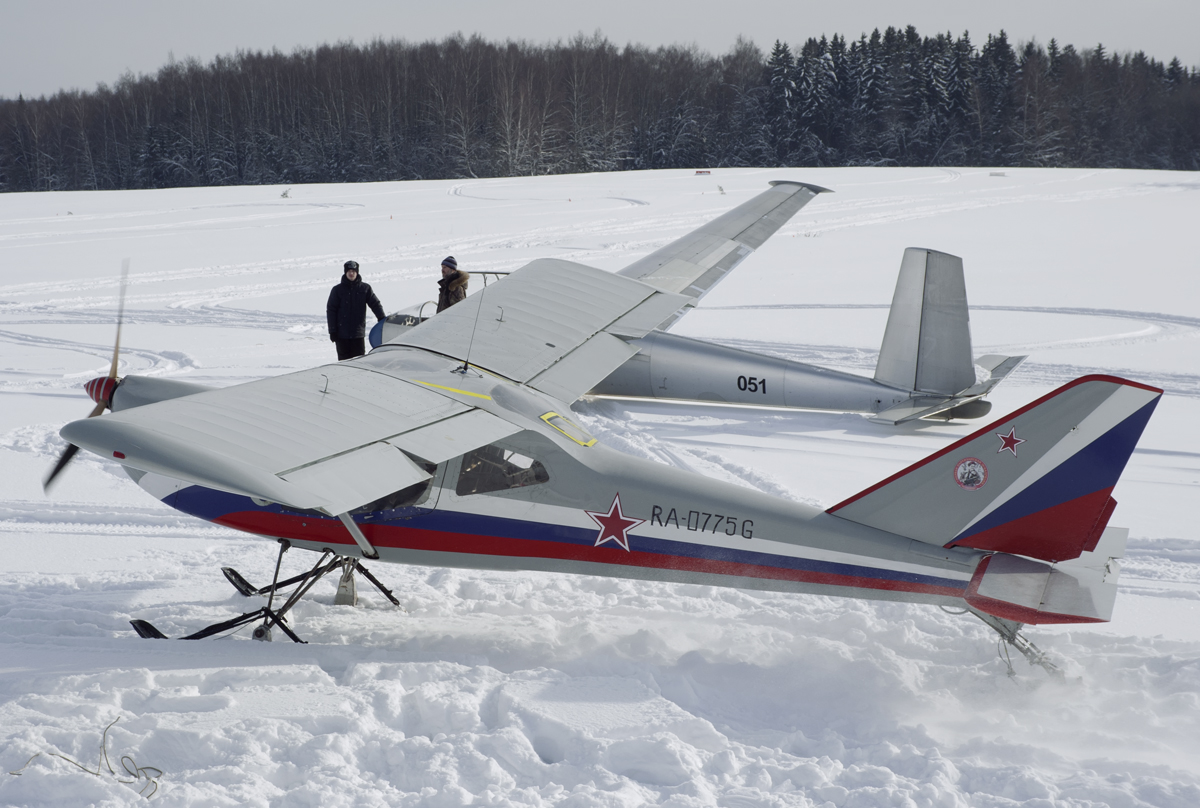

General information
- Type: Two-seat ultralight
- National origin: Ukraine
- Manufacturer: Ikar Aero Club

History
- First flight: 1999

The Ikar Ai-10 Ikar is a Ukrainian two-seat ultralight cabin monoplane, designed and built by the Ikar Aero Club of Kyiv.

== Design and development ==
First flown in 1999 the Ai-10 is a high-wing, strut-braced monoplane with a metal fuselage and fabric-covered wings. It has a fixed conventional landing gear with a tailwheel. The Ai-10 is powered by a tractor configuration Rotax 912UL, 912ULS or 914 flat-four piston engine with a three-bladed wooden propeller. The enclosed cabin has room for two seated in side-by-side configuration.

== Specification (with 912ULS engine) ==
Data from Jane's All the World's Aircraft 1989-90

General characteristics

- Crew: 2
- Length: 6.21 m (20 ft 4 in)
- Wingspan: 9.06 m (29 ft 9 in)
- Height: 1.70 m (5 ft 7 in)
- Wing area: 11.74 m^{2} (126.4 sq ft)
- Empty weight: 284 kg (626 lb)
- Max takeoff weight: 510 kg (1,124 lb)
- Powerplant: 1 × Rotax 912ULS flat-four piston, 74 kW (99 hp)
- Propellers: 3-bladed

Performance

- Cruise speed: 180 km/h (110 mph, 97 kn)
- Stall speed: 27 km/h (17 mph, 15 kn)
- Range: 1,000 km (620 mi, 540 nmi) max fuel
- g limits: +6/-3
- Rate of climb: 6.00 m/s (1,181 ft/min)

== Incidents and accidents ==
June 9, 2013 near the village Friday Solnechnogorsk district, Moscow region, during a training flight fell plane Ikar Ai-10. Killed pilot and passenger.
