= Istra Ezhik =

General information
- Type: Agricultural aircraft
- National origin: Russian Federation
- Manufacturer: Istra Experimental Mechanics Depot

The Istra Ezhik (en: Small hedgehog) is a Russian agricultural aircraft designed and developed by Istra (Istra Experimental Mechanics Depot).

== Design and development ==
The Ezhik design begun in 1999 and first exhibited in August 2005 and flew some time after. The Ezhik is a conventional low-wing cantilever monoplane powered by a Walter Minor M-337A engine. It first appeared with a conventional single fin but was later modified with twin rectangular fins. It has a raised and enclosed cockpit with two tandem-seats and a conventional landing gear with a tailwheel. The Ezhik has a welded steel tube fuselage with aluminium skin forward of the cockpit with the rest of the fuselage and tail fabric covered. It has a monospar wing and a chemical hopper in the fuselage feeds eight rotary atomisers fitted beneath the wings.

== Specifications ==
Data from Jane's All the World's Aircraft 2008-2009

General characteristics

- Crew: 2
- Length: 9.20 m (30 ft 2.25 in)
- Wingspan: 12.00 m (39 ft 4.5 in)
- Height: 3.05 m (10 ft 0 in)
- Wing area: 24.25 m^{2} (261 sq ft)
- Empty weight: 650 kg (1,433 lb)
- Gross weight: 1,150 kg (2,535 lb)
- Powerplant: 1 × Walter Minor M-337A engine , 157 kW (210 hp)

Performance

- Maximum speed: 180 km/h (112 mph, 97 kn)
- Range: 1,000 km (621 mi, 540 nmi)
- Rate of climb: 45 m/s (885 ft/min)
