= DINFIA IA 46 =

1950s Argentinian light aircraft

IA 46 Ranquel/Super Ranquel and IA 51 Tehuelche
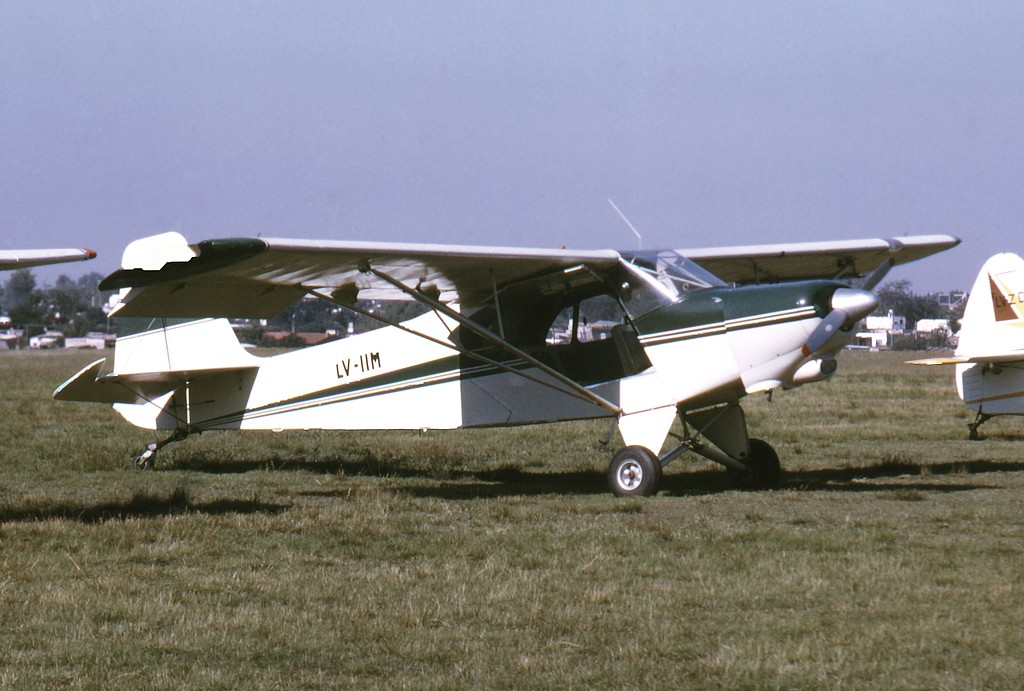
- I.A. 46 Super Ranquel at Buenos Aires - San Justo airfield in April 1975.

General information
- Type: Utility and agricultural aircraft
- Manufacturer: DINFIA
- Status: examples still in service
- Primary user: aero clubs
- Number built: 132 (IA-46); 1 (IA-51)

History
- Introduction date: 1958
- First flight: 23 December 1957

The DINFIA IA 46 Ranquel, IA 46 Super Ranquel, and IA 51 Tehuelche were Argentine utility aircraft developed in the late 1950s.

== Development and construction ==
The intention was to create a light aircraft suitable for aeroclub and agricultural use, and the resulting design was a conventional high-wing strut-braced monoplane with fixed tailwheel undercarriage. The aircraft were named for the Ranquel and Tehuelche peoples, different groups indigenous to Patagonia.

The state-owned Dinfia organisation commenced production of the Ranquel at Cordoba in 1958. Construction was of a fabric-covered tubular structure, although the Tehuelche featured metal-covered wings. Accommodation was provided for a single pilot and a passenger in tandem configuration. In all, some 132 aircraft were built, some of which served as glider tugs for the Fuerza Aerea Argentina.

Production ended in December 1968.

== Operational history ==
Examples of the IA.46 have served aero clubs from 1958 to date, with several remaining in operation in the late 2000s.

== Variants ==
IA 46 Ranquel
Initial production version with Lycoming O-320-A2B engine, one prototype and 115 production aircraft built.
IA 46 Super Ranquel
Version of IA 46 with Lycoming O-360-A1A engine, 16 built.
IA 51 Tehuelche
Version with metal-covered wings, larger flaps, and fuel capacity increased to 500 L (130 US gal). One built, first flown on 16 March 1963.

== Operators ==
Argentina

- Argentine Air Force

== Specifications (IA 46 Ranquel) ==
Data from Jane's All The World's Aircraft 1965–66

General characteristics

- Crew: 1
- Capacity:
  - 2 passengers or
  - tank for 400 L (110 US gal; 88 imp gal) chemicals
- Length: 7.45 m (24 ft 5 in)
- Wingspan: 11.60 m (38 ft 1 in)
- Height: 2.15 m (7 ft 1 in)
- Wing area: 18.0 m^{2} (194 sq ft)
- Airfoil: NACA 23012
- Empty weight: 630 kg (1,389 lb)
- Max takeoff weight: 1,160 kg (2,557 lb)
- Fuel capacity: 140 L (37 US gal; 31 imp gal)
- Powerplant: 1 × Lycoming O-320-A2B air-cooled flat-four engine, 110 kW (150 hp)
- Propellers: 2-bladed Sensenich fixed-pitch metal propeller

Performance

- Maximum speed: 180 km/h (110 mph, 97 kn)
- Cruise speed: 162 km/h (101 mph, 87 kn)
- Range: 650 km (400 mi, 350 nmi)
- Endurance: 4 hr
- Service ceiling: 4,000 m (13,000 ft)
- Rate of climb: 2.40 m/s (472 ft/min)
