= INTA HM.1 =

Spanish trainer aircraft

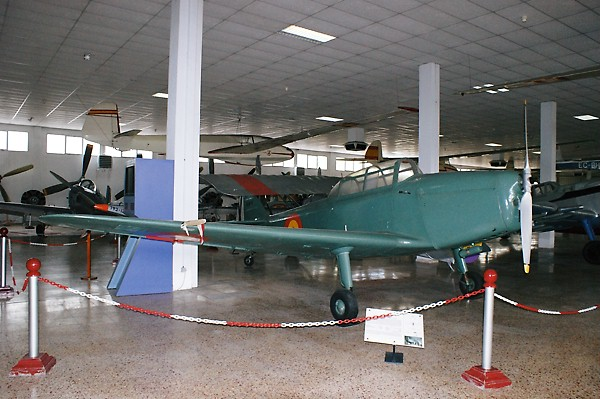
- An HM. 1 at the Museo del Aire, Cuatro Vientos, Madrid.

General information
- Type: Primary trainer
- National origin: Spain
- Manufacturer: Aeronáutica Industrial S.A.
- Designer: Pedro Huarte-Mendicoa
- Number built: 200

History
- First flight: 1943

The INTA HM.1, also known as Huarte Mendicoa HM-1, was a 1940s Spanish primary trainer designed by the Instituto Nacional de Técnica Aeronáutica (INTA) and built for them by Aeronáutica Industrial S.A.

== Development ==
The HM.1 was designed by INTA as a two-seat primary training monoplane with a fixed tailwheel landing gear. It was followed by a number of similar aircraft with equipment and accommodation changes. The last of the family was the HM.7 built in 1947 which was an enlarged four-seat version powered by a 240 hp (179 kW) Argus As 10C engine, the HM.7 was the last powered aircraft designed by the Institute.

== Variants ==
HM.1
Two-seat primary trainer
HM.2
enclosed-cabin version of the HM.1 with retractable landing gear.
HM.3
open-cockpit floatplane variant
HM.5
single-seat advanced trainer
HM.7
enlarged four-seat version
HM.9
two-seat glider tug

== Operators ==
Spain

- Spanish Air Force

== Specification HM.1 ==
Data from Jane's Fighting Aircraft of World War II

General characteristics

- Crew: 2
- Length: 7.65 m (25 ft 0 in)
- Wingspan: 9.65 m (31 ft 8 in)
- Height: 2.20 m (7 ft 2.25 in)
- Wing area: 14 m^{2} (150.6 sq ft)
- Empty weight: 620 kg (1,364 lb)
- Gross weight: 850 kg (1,870 lb)
- Powerplant: 1 × Elizalde G-IV-B Tigre 4-cylinder four-cylinder linear motor , 110 kW (150 hp)

Performance

- Maximum speed: 230 km/h (142.8 mph, 124.1 kn)
- Cruise speed: 195 km/h (121 mph, 105 kn)
- Endurance: 3 hours 30 minutes
- Service ceiling: 5,000 m (16,400 ft)
