= Indaer Peru Chuspi =

Chuspi

General information
- Type: Light aircraft
- National origin: Peru
- Manufacturer: Indaer Peru
- Number built: 12

History
- First flight: August 1987

The Indaer Peru Chuspi is a Peruvian single-engined light aircraft. Twelve aircraft were built between 1987 and 1990.

== Design and development ==
In 1980, the Peruvian Air Force set up Peru's first aircraft manufacturer, Industria Aeronautica del Peru (Indero Peru), with the intent on building Aermacchi MB.339 jet trainers under licence. High costs caused these plans to be abandoned, and it was eventually decided for the company to move into the General aviation field, negotiating licenses for production of the Aero Boero AB-115, AB-180 and the Pilatus PC-6, (Note: No production followed from these agreements.) as well as a small two-seat lightplane based on popular kit aircraft such as the Denney Kitfox and Avid Flyer, the Indaer Peru Chuspi.

Like the types upon it was based, the Chupsi (Mosquito) is a single-engine monoplane with a braced high wing. The fuselage is of welded steel tube construction with a fabric covering, while the wings are of mixed construction, the aluminium spars and plywood ribs. An enclosed cockpit accommodates two seats side-by-side and can be fitted with dual controls. It is powered by a single Rotax 532 piston engine driving a two-bladed fixed-pitch propeller. Either a tailwheel or nosewheel undercarriage can be fitted.

The prototype made its maiden flight in August 1987, entering production in 1988. Aircraft could be fitted for crop spraying or sport purposes. A total of twelve aircraft were completed by January 1990.

== Specifications ==
Data from Jane's All The World's Aircraft 1990–91

General characteristics

- Crew: 2
- Length: 5.20 m (17 ft 1 in)
- Wingspan: 9.15 m (30 ft 0 in)
- Height: 1.75 m (5 ft 9 in) (tail up)
- Wing area: 11.58 m^{2} (124.6 sq ft)
- Aspect ratio: 7.23:1
- Empty weight: 214 kg (472 lb)
- Max takeoff weight: 409 kg (902 lb)
- Fuel capacity: 45.4 L (12 US gal, 10 Imp gal)
- Powerplant: 1 × Rotax 532 LC two-cylinder piston engine, 48 kW (64 hp)

Performance

- Maximum speed: 129 km/h (80 mph, 70 kn)
- Stall speed: 40 km/h (25 mph, 22 kn)
- Never exceed speed: 177 km/h (110 mph, 96 kn)
- Range: 441 km (274 mi, 238 nmi)
- Service ceiling: 6,700 m (22,000 ft)
- Rate of climb: 7.1 m/s (1,400 ft/min)
