= IAE VUT Marabou =

General information
- Type: Piloted UAV surrogate
- National origin: Czech Republic
- Manufacturer: Institute of Aerospace Engineering; Vsoké Učeni Techniké Brně (Brno University of Technology)

History
- First flight: 29 April 2010

The IAE VUT Marabou was built as a piloted test vehicle to develop autonomous control of unmanned aerial vehicles (UAVs) flying in civil airspace. Czech-designed and constructed, it first flew in April 2010.

== Design and development ==
The Marabou (English: Stork) was designed and built at the Institute of Aerospace Engineering of Brno University of Technology with support from the Czech Ministry of Industry and Trade and the involvement of industrial partners Jihlavav Airplanes (aircraft), PBS Velká Biteš (engines) and Plastservis-L (composites). It is specifically designed to provide pilot oversight of the development of an autonomous control system that will allow UAVs to be operated safely in civil rôles and airspace.

The Marabou is a mid-wing, pod-and-boom style, tandem two-seat aircraft with a pusher configuration single engine and a T-tail. The wings are trapezoidal and with 6° of dihedral outboard of a brief, constant chord centre section, terminating in winglets. They carry rod actuated ailerons and electrically powered Fowler flaps. The fin and unbalanced, tab-assisted rudder are swept and the tapered tailplane carries a single-piece tapered elevator. All manual controls are integrated in the UAV's own control drives. The outer wing panels and horizontal tail are metal structures; the wing centre section and the vertical tail are composite.

Seats are in tandem with the forward one well ahead of the wing and the raised rear seat just forward of its leading edge. The canopy, with a smooth and rising profile, is divided into two single-piece transparencies. A 60 kW (80 hp) Rotax 912 flat-four engine is mounted immediately behind and above the rear seat in pusher configuration. The fuselage is a wholly composite structure. The Marabou has a low tricycle undercarriage with fuselage-mounted, glass reinforced plastic cantilever mainlegs. The nosewheel is steerable and the mainwheels have hydraulic brakes.

The first flight was made on 29 April 2010.

== Operational history ==
In addition to its control development programme, the Marabou has test flown a single small turbojet engine, the 1.0 kN (225 lb) PBS Velká Biteš TJ-100M, mounted on a short pylon above the port wing at the outer end of the centre section. Its fuel is carried in a separate centre section tank.

== Specifications ==
Data from Jane's All the World's Aircraft 2011/12

General characteristics

- Capacity: two
- Length: 8.10 m (26 ft 7 in)
- Wingspan: 9,090 m (29,822 ft 10 in)
- Height: 2.40 m (7 ft 10 in)
- Wing area: 11.85 m^{2} (127.6 sq ft) gross
- Max takeoff weight: 600 kg (1,323 lb)
- Fuel capacity: 124 L (32.8 US gal; 27.3 Imp gal)
- Powerplant: 1 × Rotax 912 A2 flat-four, 59.6 kW (79.9 hp)
- Propellers: 3-bladed pusher

Performance

- Maximum speed: 218 km/h (135 mph, 118 kn)
- Cruise speed: 190 km/h (120 mph, 100 kn)
- Stall speed: 69 km/h (43 mph, 37 kn)
- Never exceed speed: 263 km/h (163 mph, 142 kn)
