= DINFIA IA 45 =

IA 45 Querandi
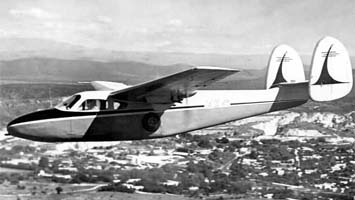

General information
- Type: Light transport
- National origin: Argentina
- Manufacturer: DINFIA
- Number built: 2

History
- First flight: 1957

The DINFIA IA 45 Querandi was a 1950s Argentine twin-engined light transport aircraft built by the DINFIA.

== Development ==
The IA 45 Querandi was designed as a twin engined light transport suitable for both private and as an air taxi. Work began on the new project in 1954, with work being suspended in 1955 and restarted in 1956. A twin-engined all metal high-wing cantilever monoplane with an upswept rear fuselage, it had a tailplane with two fins and rudders and retractable tricycle landing gear. It was powered by two pusher configuration piston engines. The first prototype, powered by 150 hp (110 kW) Lycoming O-320 engines, and seating five, first flew on 23 September 1957. It proved underpowered and was followed by a second prototype, powered by 180 hp (130 kW) Lycoming O-360 engines, and accommodating six seats, which first flew on 15 November 1960.

There was little interest in the IA 45 from Argentina's air taxi operators, who preferred imported American aircraft like the Piper Apache and the Aero Commander 500, and the programme was stopped in 1962, with no more production beyond the two prototypes. They continued to be flown by DIFNIA until 1966–1967, after which they were scrapped.

== Variants ==
IA 45
Prototype powered by two Avco Lycoming O-320 piston engines, one built, first flight 23 September 1957.
IA 45B
Improved version with six seats and powered by two Lycoming O-360 piston engines, one built, first flight 15 November 1960.

== Specifications (IA 45B) ==
Data from Jane's All The World's Aircraft 1961–62

General characteristics

- Crew: 1
- Capacity: 5 passengers
- Length: 8.92 m (29 ft 3 in)
- Wingspan: 13.75 m (45 ft 1 in)
- Height: 2.79 m (9 ft 2 in)
- Wing area: 19.3 m^{2} (208 sq ft)
- Aspect ratio: 9.8:1
- Airfoil: NACA 23016 at root, 23010 at tip
- Empty weight: 1,710 kg (3,770 lb)
- Gross weight: 1,800 kg (3,968 lb)
- Fuel capacity: 400 L (110 US gal; 88 imp gal)
- Powerplant: 2 × Lycoming O-360 air-cooled flat-four engines, 130 kW (180 hp) each

Performance

- Maximum speed: 276 km/h (171 mph, 149 kn) at sea level
- Cruise speed: 245 km/h (152 mph, 132 kn) at sea level (75% power)
- Stall speed: 110 km/h (68 mph, 59 kn) (flaps down)
- Range: 1,100 km (680 mi, 590 nmi) (30 min reserves, 75% power)
- Service ceiling: 7,500 m (24,600 ft) (absolute ceiling)
- Rate of climb: 7.0 m/s (1,380 ft/min)
