= Ishikawajima T-2 =

Japanese reconnaissance aircraft prototype

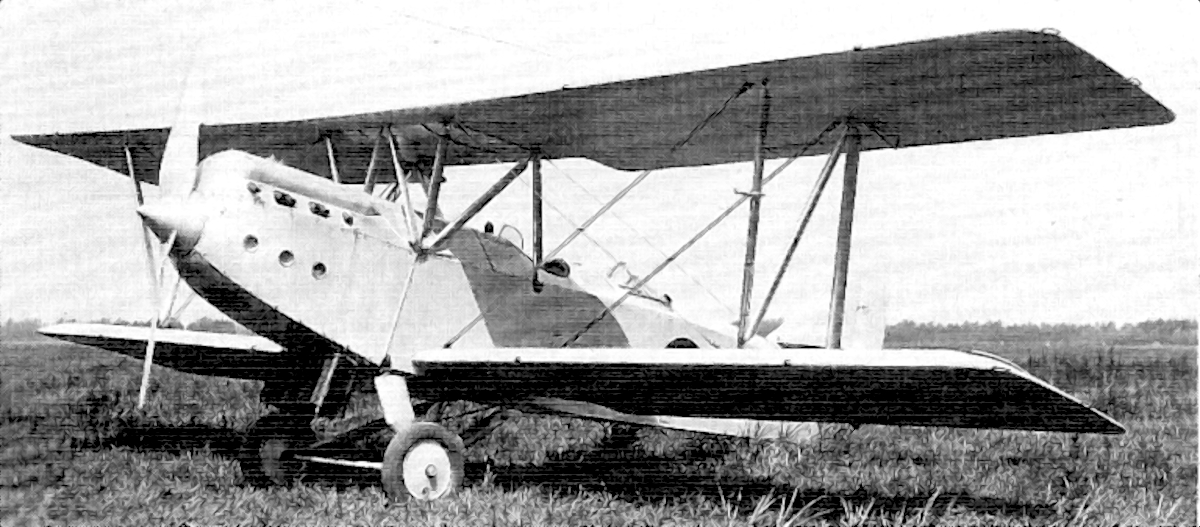

General information
- Type: Reconnaissance aircraft
- National origin: Japan
- Manufacturer: Ishikawajima Aircraft Manufacturing Co. Ltd
- Designer: Shiro Yoshihara
- Number built: 2

History
- First flight: Summer 1927

The Ishikawajima T-2 was a Japanese reconnaissance aircraft designed to meet the requirements of an Army competition between wood- and metal framed contestants. First flown in 1927 only two, with different engines, were built.

== Design and development ==
In November 1925 Ishikawajima, along with Kawasaki, Mitsubishi and Nakajima, received an Army specification for an experimental reconnaissance aircraft. Ishikawajima's design, specified as all-wooden, was ready by August 1926 and they, along with Kawasaki and Mitsubishi who had submitted metals-framed designs, received orders for two prototypes. The first prototype of the Ishikawajima T-2 (T for Teisatsuki, Reconnaissance) was completed in July 1927 and the second followed in November.

The T-2 was a single bay biplane with rectangular plan, unequal span wings built around two spars and fabric-covered. The wings were braced together with N-form struts between the spars and held over the fuselage with outward-leaning N-struts and a forward inverted V-strut.

The first T-2 was powered by a 450–500 hp (340–370 kW) Hispano-Suiza and the second by a 500–600 hp (370–450 kW) BMW VI, which lengthened the fuselage by 476 mm (18.7 in). Both were water-cooled V-12 engines. The T-2s were flown from an open cockpit behind the upper wing trailing edge, which had a rectangular cut-out to improve upward vision. The pilot controlled a fixed pair of 7.7 mm (0.30 in) guns. Behind him, a second cockpit housed a dorsal gunner and his pair of guns, flexibly-mounted but of the same calibre. The landing gear was of the fixed, single axle type and had short, faired legs with rearward drag struts. Both legs and struts were mounted on the lower fuselage longerons.

After initial company tests had been completed, both prototypes were handed over to the Army at Tokorozawa in December 1927 where they joined the prototypes from the other manufacturers. Competitive testing convinced the Army that more expensive metal-framed airframes were more durable than wooden ones when aileron failure in one of the T-2s spread further into the structure. The Kawasaki design won the contest and was produced as the Kawasaki Type 88.

== Specifications (second prototype) ==
Data from Japanese Aircraft 1910-1941

General characteristics

- Capacity: Two
- Length: 10.29 m (33 ft 9 in)
- Upper wingspan: 14.01 m (46 ft 0 in)
- Lower wingspan: 12.25 m (40 ft 2 in)
- Height: 3.85 m (12 ft 8 in)
- Wing area: 49 m^{2} (530 sq ft)
- Empty weight: 1,734 kg (3,823 lb)
- Gross weight: 2,817 kg (6,210 lb)
- Powerplant: 1 × BMW VI water-cooled V12, 340–370 kW (450–500 hp)
- Propellers: 2-bladed wooden

Performance

- Maximum speed: 233 km/h (145 mph, 126 kn)
- Landing speed: 91 km/h (57 mph; 49 kn)
- Service ceiling: 7,450 m (24,440 ft)
- Time to altitude: 29 min 9 sec to 5,000 m (16,000 ft)

Armament

- Guns: 2 × 7.7 mm (0.30 in) fixed machine guns firing forwards with another pair flexibly mounted in rear cockpit.
