= Itoh Tsurubane No.1 =

1910s Japanese biplane aircraft

Tsurubane No.1

General information
- Type: Demonstrator and trainer
- National origin: Japan
- Manufacturer: Itoh Aeroplane Research Studio
- Designer: Otojiro Itoh
- Number built: 1

History
- First flight: completed 8 May 1918

The Itoh Tsurubane No.1 was a single seat aviation demonstrator and trainer biplane first flown in Japan in 1918.

== Design and development ==
The Tsurubane's design was the result of the retrieval of a 50 hp (37 kW) Gnome rotary engine from the crashed Tamai No.3 by a relative of Itoh's talented assistant, Toyotaro Yamagata, and given to him to create his own aircraft. Yamagata made some initial sketches but Itoh was asked to take on the detailed design.

The aircraft that emerged was a wooden-structured, fabric covered two bay biplane. Its wings were rectangular in plan, with bays separated by pairs of upright, parallel interplane struts. The considerable overhang of the upper, greater span, wing was wire braced and a cabane of parallel struts held the central upper wing high above the fuselage. As on Itoh's earlier aircraft there were ailerons only on the upper wings, with chords that increased outwards.

Its rotary engine was shrouded with a standard, open-bottomed cowling intended to collect oil spray. Behind it the fuselage became slender and flat-sided, as with Itoh's earlier designs. Its pilot had an open cockpit near the wing trailing edge. The tail was like that of the Itoh Emi 2 with the horizontal tail mounted on the top of the fuselage carrying elevators that had a cut-out for rudder movement. The fin and rudder had upright, parallel edges but a sloping top.

Though its landing gear was a conventional, single axle design, Itoh was aware of the need to make it robust. It had large wheels and was taller than those of his earlier landplanes, with landing legs and rearward drag struts doubly cross-braced.

The Tsurubane was completed on 8 May 1918 and flown soon after.

== Operational history ==
The Tsurubane No.1, like several other early Japanese civil aircraft, initially paid its way with demonstration flights. Yamagata began with flights around Hiroshima. These attracted support from the Asahi Shimbun newspaper resulting in a tour of Korea, at that time part of the Japanese empire, throughout November 1918. In the following spring the Tsurubane gave many exhibition flights in Osaka. World-wide, early aircraft demonstrators included risky tricks to swell audiences: on one occasion the Tsurubane carried a passenger astride the fuselage.

When it was retired from demonstration flights, the Tsurubane was used as a trainer by Itoh's flying school. It is not known how long it remained airworthy but it was eventually privately purchased, then donated to the Aki-Itsukushima Shrine near Hiroshima.

== Specifications ==
Data from Japanese Aircraft 1910-1941

General characteristics

- Crew: one
- Length: 6.5 m (21 ft 4 in)
- Wingspan: 10 m (32 ft 10 in)
- Height: 2.6 m (8 ft 6 in)
- Wing area: 30 m^{2} (320 sq ft)
- Empty weight: 380 kg (838 lb)
- Gross weight: 520 kg (1,146 lb)
- Powerplant: 1 × Gnome seven cylinder rotary, 37 kW (50 hp)
- Propellers: 2-bladed

Performance

- Maximum speed: 80 km/h (50 mph, 43 kn)
