= IABSA Premier 64-01 =

Premier 64-01

General information
- Type: Training or touring monoplane
- National origin: Brazil
- Manufacturer: Indústria Aeronáutica Brasileira
- Designer: Vicente Martin Llopis
- Number built: 1

History
- First flight: 1964

The IABSA Premier 64-01 was a Brazilian two-seat training and touring braced high-wing monoplane designed and built in small numbers by Industria Aeronáutica Brasileira (IABSA), powered by a 75 hp (56 kW) piston engine.

== Specifications ==
Data from Jane's All The World's Aircraft 1965–66

General characteristics

- Crew: two
- Length: 6.70 m (22 ft 0 in)
- Wingspan: 10.70 m (35 ft 1 in)
- Wing area: 16.0 m^{2} (172 sq ft)
- Empty weight: 340 kg (750 lb)
- Max takeoff weight: 580 kg (1,279 lb)
- Fuel capacity: 70 L (15 imp gal; 18 US gal)
- Powerplant: 1 × Continental A75 air-cooled four-cylinder horizontally-opposed engine, 56 kW (75 hp)
- Propellers: 2-bladed McCauley 1A90 fixed pitch metal propeller

Performance

- Maximum speed: 160 km/h (99 mph, 86 kn)
- Cruise speed: 130 km/h (81 mph, 70 kn) (normal cruise)
- Range: 600 km (370 mi, 320 nmi)
- Service ceiling: 4,000 m (13,000 ft)
