= Iannotta San Francesco =

San Francesco

General information
- Type: Two seat homebuilt motor glider
- National origin: Italy
- Designer: Orlando Iannotta
- Number built: at least 9

The Iannotta I-66L San Francesco is a 1960s Italian ultralight designed to be homebuilt from plans. It has been powered by several flat-four engines in the 65-100 hp range and built in both single and two-seat tandem configurations. Only small numbers have been completed.

== Design and development ==
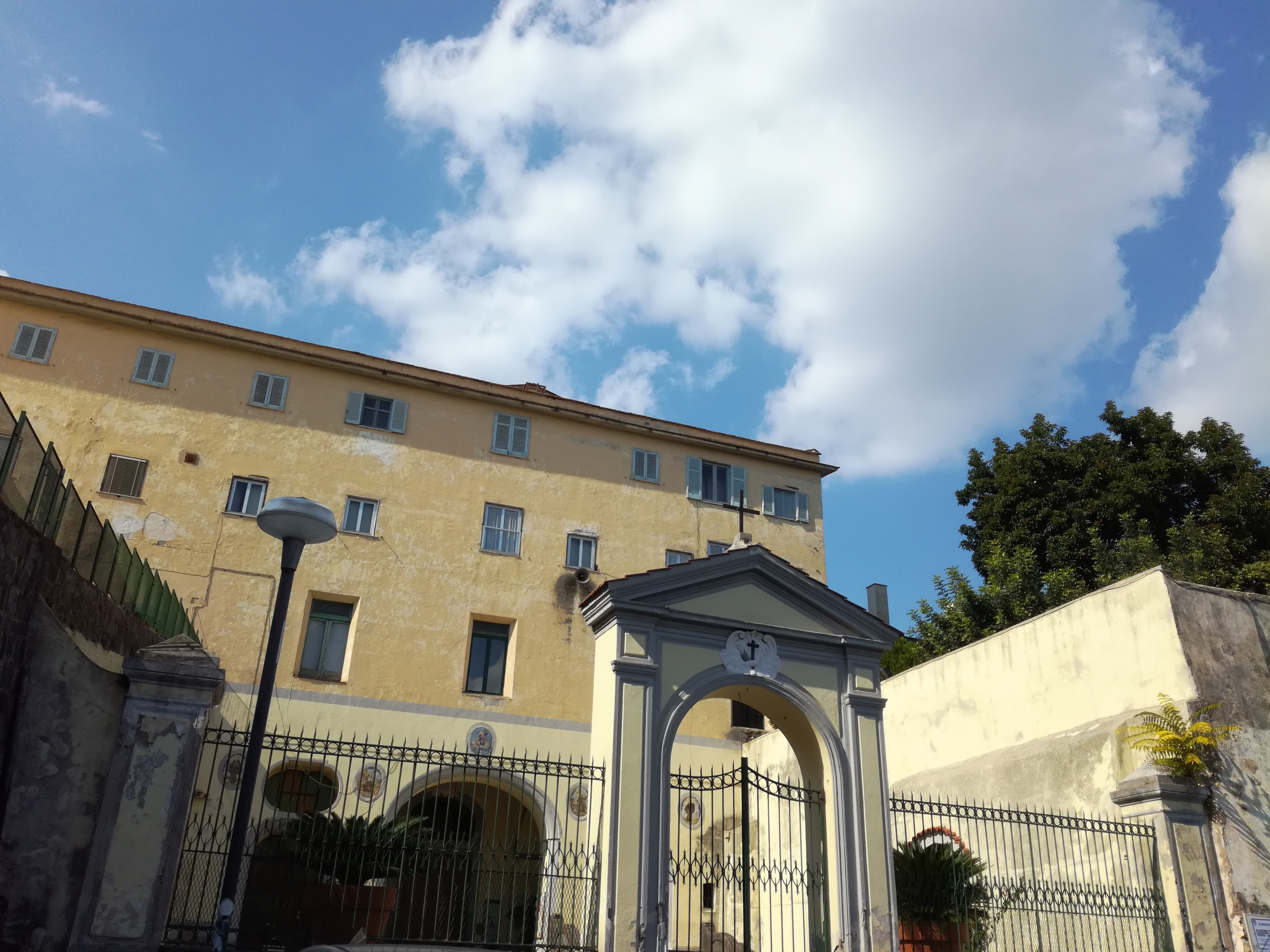
The church of Eframo Vecchio, Naples, associated with the Capuchin House where the San Francesco prototype was built

The Iannotta I-66 San Francesco acquired its number from the year in which its construction was started (1966). When its designer and builder ran out of room in his Neapolitan accommodation and was concerned about the noise of engine testing in an urban environment, he was offered space at a Capuchin Friary associated with the Church of Eframo the Elder in Naples. He and his prototype remained there for two years; since the Capuchins are an offshoot of the Franciscan Order, he named the aircraft after the founder, St Francis of Assisi.

The San Francesco is a conventionally arranged single-engine, high-wing light aircraft. It has constant chord wings with rounded tips, built of wood with plywood leading edges and fabric covered. Each wing has a V-shaped pair of lift struts attached to the lower fuselage longerons and assisted by a single subsidiary strut from each lift strut upwards to the wing. The flat sided, fabric covered fuselage is a steel tube structure with wooden formers. The square tipped fin has a swept leading edge and a curved fillet; it carries a deep rudder with a straight trailing edge, which extends between the elevators to the bottom of the fuselage. The tailplane, with swept leading edges, is wire-braced to the fin. All tail surfaces are fabric covered steel tube structures.

The San Francesco has a conventional fixed tailwheel undercarriage with sprung half axles mounted on central struts below the fuselage. Its cabin begins ahead of the wing and extends rearwards under it. Versions of the aircraft have flown with at least three variants of the Limbach adaptations of the flat four-cylinder Volkswagen motor: the early San Francescos had the 51 kW (68 hp) 1700E and some later ones 60 kW (80 hp) or 75 kW (100 hp) Limbachs.

== Operational history ==
The San Francesco was designed to be homebuilt from plans. In mid-2010, nine San Francescos were listed on the civil aircraft registers of European countries west of Russia. Four were San Francesco IIIs, three were I-96s and the remainder other variants. The prototype was still flying in 2000. At about that time, the aircraft was being marketed as the Voliamo San Francesco and described as an experimental ultralight.

== Variants ==
Iannotta I-66 San Francesco
prototype, single-seat
Iannotta I-66 San Francesco
68 hp Limbach 1700E. Two seats, cabin glazing to about 65% chord.
Iannotta I-96 San Francesco
No details available
Voliamo San Francesco III
100 hp Limbach engine. Two-seat: cabin glazing extended rearwards to wing trailing edge.
Voliamo San Francesco 942 AL
No details available

== Specifications (I-66L, Limbach SL 1700E) ==
Data from Jane's All the World's Aircraft 1992-93

General characteristics

- Capacity: two
- Length: 6.6 m (21 ft 8 in)
- Wingspan: 9.34 m (30 ft 8 in)
- Wing area: 13.61 m^{2} (146.5 sq ft)
- Airfoil: NACA 23012
- Empty weight: 268 kg (591 lb)
- Max takeoff weight: 462 kg (1,019 lb)
- Fuel capacity: 70 L (15.4 Imp gal, 18.5 US gal)
- Powerplant: 1 × Limbach SL 1700E 4-cylinder flat four, air cooled, 51 kW (68 hp)
- Propellers: 2-bladed, 1.45 m (4 ft 9 in) diameter

Performance

- Maximum speed: 150 km/h (93 mph, 81 kn)
- Cruise speed: 130 km/h (81 mph, 70 kn) at sea level
- Range: 700 km (430 mi, 380 nmi)
- Service ceiling: 3,800 m (12,500 ft) service
- Maximum glide ratio: 14:1 unpowered, at 93 km/h (58 mph, 50 kn)
- Rate of climb: 3.5 m/s (690 ft/min)
- Rate of sink: 1.4 m/s (280 ft/min) unpowered, minimum, at 88 km/h (55 mph, 48 kn)
