= Turrin =

Turrin is a surname. Notable people with the surname include:

- Alex Turrin (born 1992), Italian cyclist
- Alessandro Turrin (born 1997), Italian footballer
- Spencer Turrin (born 1991), Australian representative rower
