= IAR-821 =

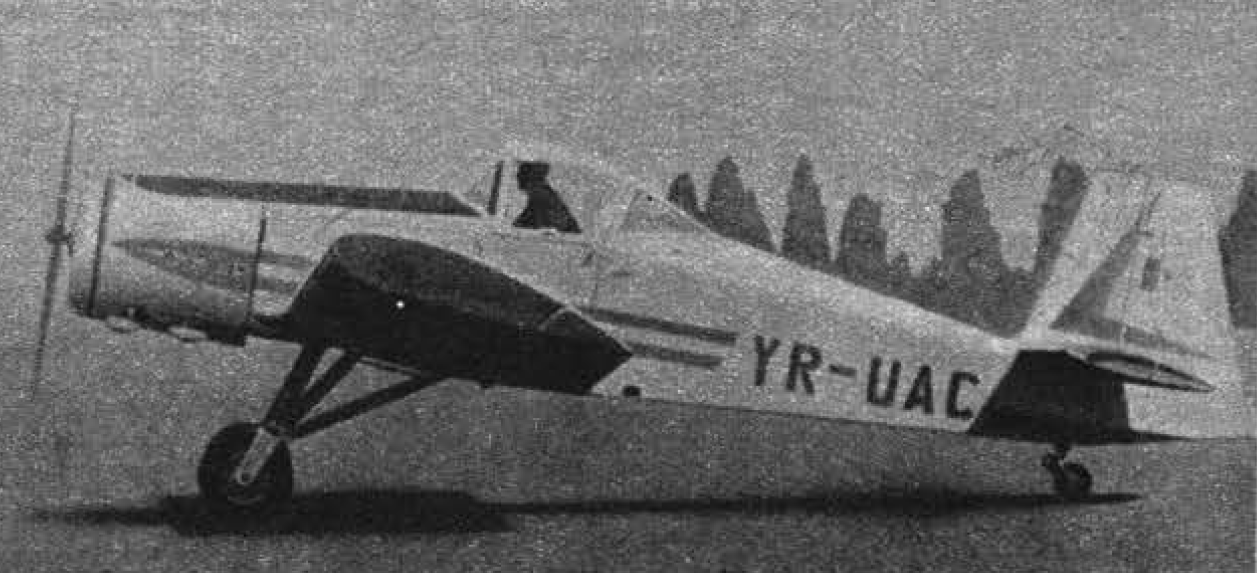

General information
- Type: Agricultural aircraft
- National origin: Romania
- Manufacturer: IRMA
- Designer: Radu Manicatide - IAR
- Primary user: Romanian Utilitary Aviation
- Number built: 21

History
- Introduction date: 1968
- First flight: 1967

The IAR-821 was an agricultural aircraft built in Romania in the 1960s. It was a conventional low-wing monoplane with fixed, tailwheel undercarriage.

== Development ==
The IAR-821 is an agricultural crop sprayer and duster aircraft. The design was completed under the leadership of eng. Radu Manicatide in 1967, at IMFCA Bucharest (Institutul de Mecanica Fluidelor si Cercetari Aerospatiale - Institute of Fluid Mechanics and Aerospace Research). It was built at IRMA (Intreprinderea de Reparatii Material Aeronautic - Enterprise for Aeronautical Material Repairement), in Bucharest. A small series of 20 aircraft was produced in 1968 and 1969, plus a single example of a trainer aircraft designated IAR-821B that had a second cockpit installed in place of the IAR-821's chemical tank, and was equipped with a new chemical tank of smaller capacity. It was intended that this aircraft should equip Romanian flying schools from 1969, but this did not happen.

== Design ==
A low-wing monoplane, it featured mixed wood-metal structure, with the fuselage and wing roots built from welded chrome-molybdenum tube, and the outer wings and tail unit from wood. The front fuselage had aluminium panels, while the rest of the surface was plywood covered with fabric. The propulsion was provided by an Ivchenko AI-14 RF, a single row air-cooled 9-cylinder radial capable of delivering 300 hp (221 kW), located at the apex of the front fuselage contained in a NACA cowling and combined with a three blade propeller with fixed pitch.

== Variants ==
IAR-821A
Monoplace agricultural crop sprayer and duster aircraft

IAR-821B
Biplace trainer aircraft with smaller capacity chemical tank

== Operators ==
Romania

Romanian Utilitary Aviation - the only operator of the IAR-821

== Specifications (IAR-821) ==
Data from Jane's All The World's Aircraft 1971–72

General characteristics

- Crew: One pilot
- Capacity: 600 kg (1,300 lb) chemicals
- Length: 9.20 m (30 ft 2 in)
- Wingspan: 12.80 m (42 ft 0 in)
- Height: 2.80 m (9 ft 1.5 in)
- Wing area: 26.0 m^{2} (280 sq ft)
- Empty weight: 1,080 kg (2,380 lb)
- Gross weight: 1,900 kg (4,180 lb)
- Powerplant: 1 × Ivchenko AI-14RF , 220 kW (300 hp)

Performance

- Maximum speed: 212 km/h (132 mph, 115 kn)
- Endurance: 2 hours 36 minutes
- Service ceiling: 6,200 m (20,300 ft)
- Rate of climb: 8.0 m/s (1,575 ft/min)
