= Ion Aircraft Ion =

Prototype 2007 general aviation aircraft by Ion Aircraft

Ion
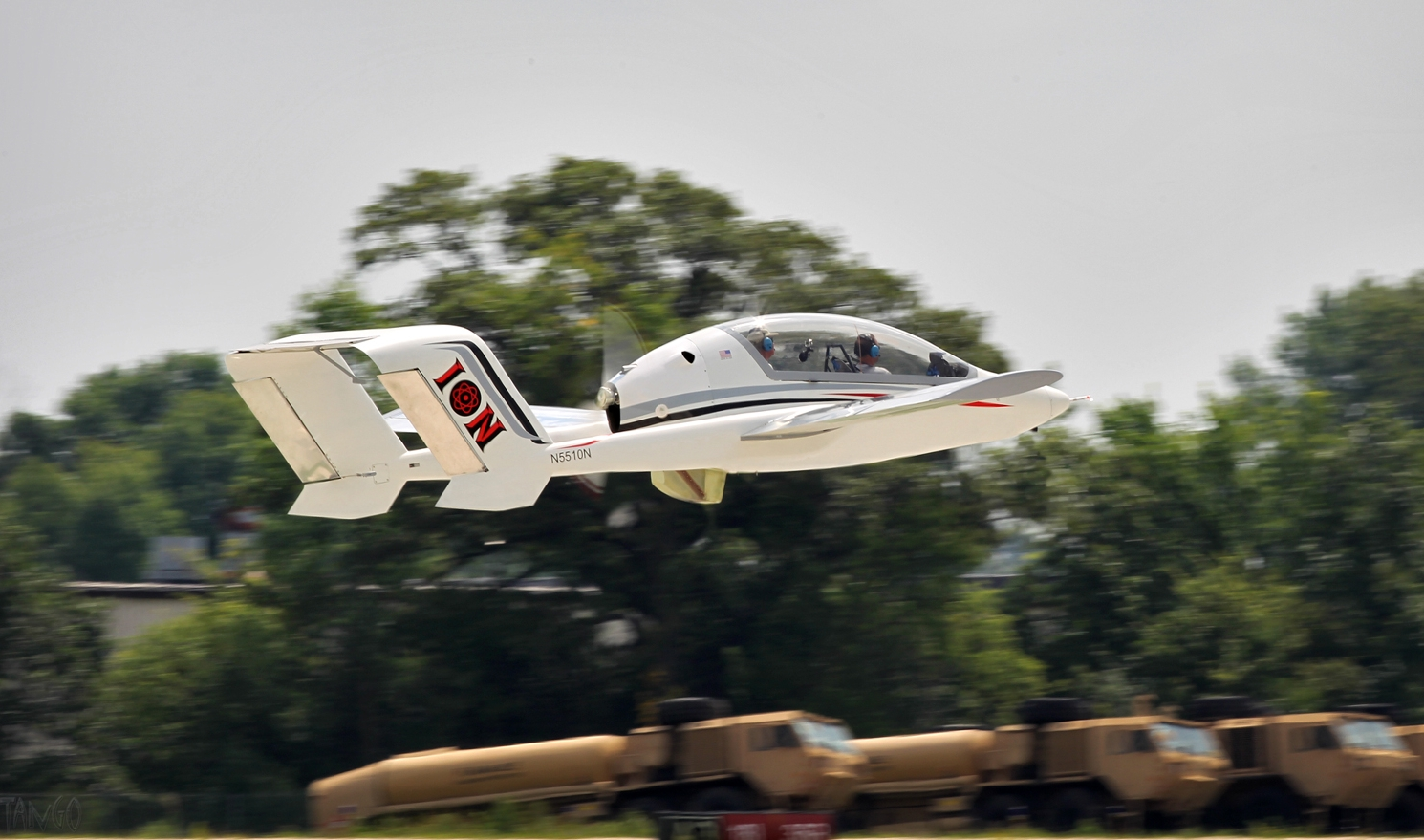
- Ion at AirVenture 2010

General information
- Type: Two seat light aircraft
- National origin: United States
- Manufacturer: Ion Aircraft
- Number built: One (2011)

History
- First flight: 17 July 2007
- Developed from: DreamWings Valkyrie

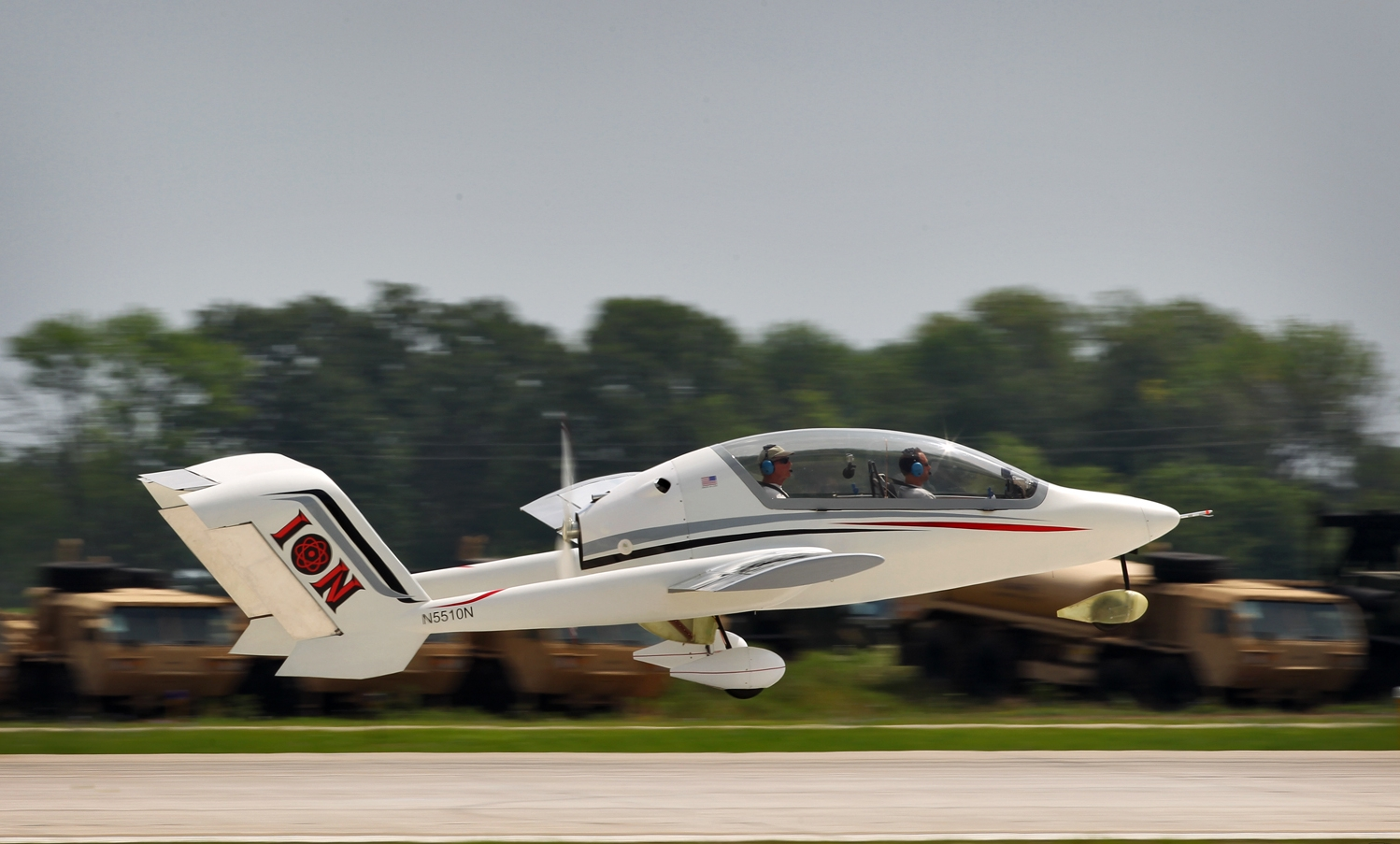
Ion prototype at AirVenture 2010

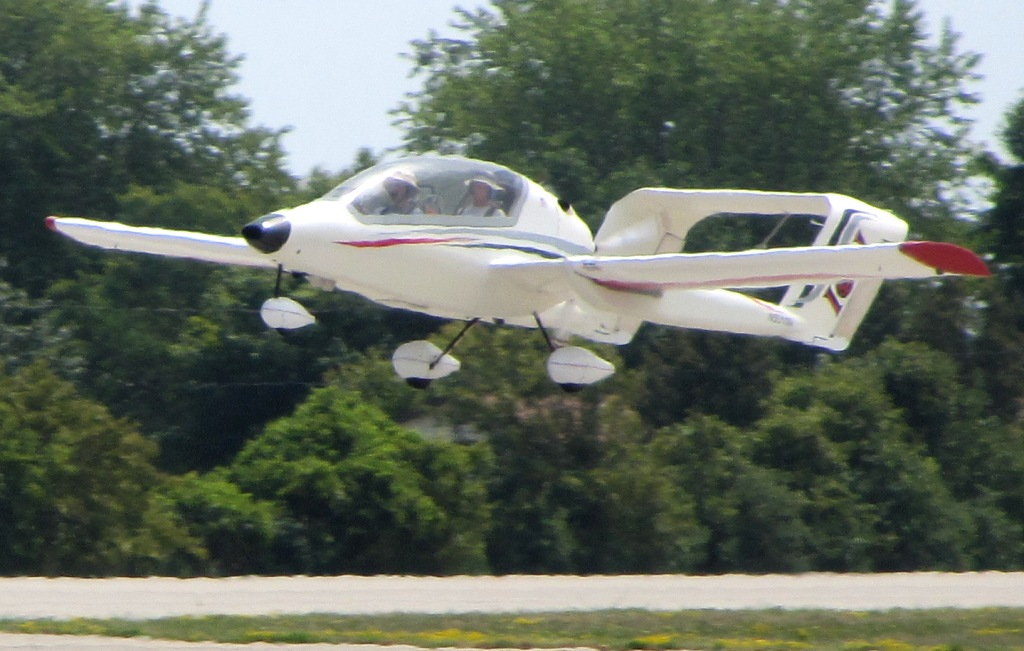
ION 100

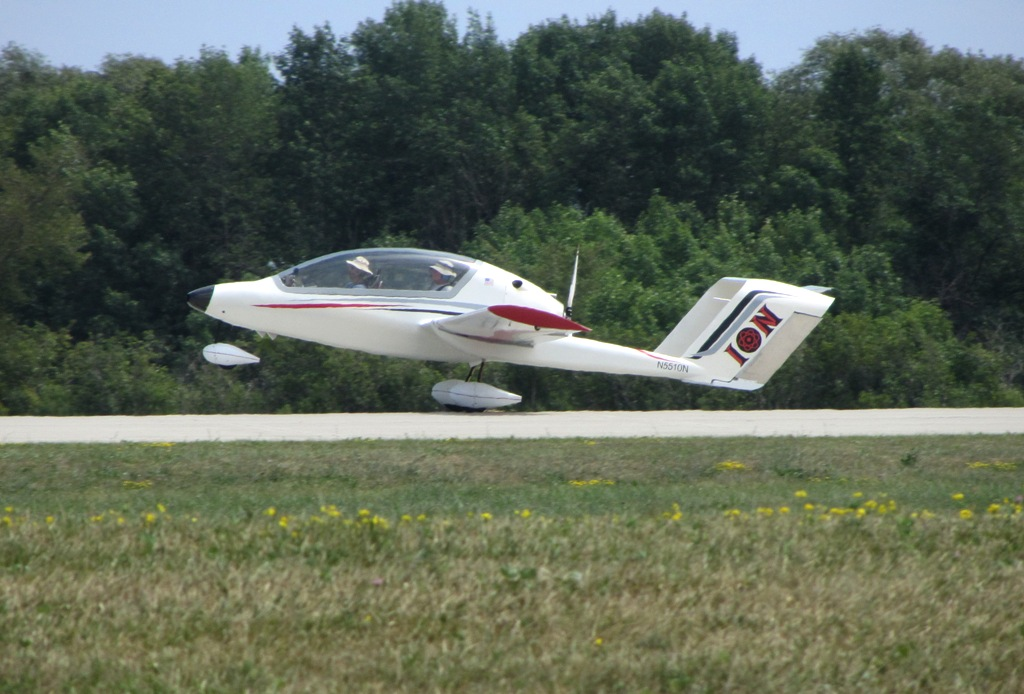
ION 100

The Ion Aircraft is a two-seat, twin boom, pusher configuration light aircraft based on the DreamWings Valkyrie. It was still in development in 2010 but is intended either for homebuilding from kits or flyaway production, with versions meeting US and European rules.

By November 2020 the company was for sale. GCM a capital management firm based in San Diego, California completed the acquisition of Ion Aircraft on 10 September 2021. In September 2021, the company was fully acquired by GCM Capital Management, based in San Diego, California. The acquisition was led by John Chen, who now fully owns and operates ION Aircraft.

== Design and development ==
The Ion Aircraft Ion is a development of the DreamWings Valkyrie, a twin boom, pusher configuration ultralight aircraft which flew for the first time in 1999. The Valkyrie generated considerable interest and many potential customers, but DreamWings became bankrupt in 2001. The project was later restarted by a customer group under the name of Ion Aircraft and the part-built prototype of the Ion was displayed at Oshkosh in July 2005, though the first "hops" were not made until July 2007. Whilst the Valkyrie and the Ion share the share twin boom, single pusher engine, mid-wing layout, have tricycle undercarriages and seat two in tandem, they differ significantly. In particular the Valkyrie's strongly swept and tapered fins, combined with a trailing low set horizontal tail, which extended beyond the booms, have been replaced with swept, parallel chord fins with a constant chord tailplane linking their upper tips. Unlike the Valkyrie, the Ion does not have a canard.

Much of the Ion is made of composite materials; the fuselage pod, the wing centre section within the booms, the booms themselves and the empennage are all formed from carbon fiber/epoxy pre-pregs. Outboard of the booms the wings are of bonded aluminium. The wings carry plain piano hinged ailerons. The engine cover is GRP. The cockpit has a single piece canopy, shaped to allow the rear seat to be 8.5 in (220 mm) above the forward one, giving its occupant better vision. The prototype has fixed, aluminium cantilever spring main undercarriage legs and has been flown with and without wheel fairings. The mainwheels have hydraulic brakes and the nosewheel castors.

Several options are to be offered, including a 3 ft 6 in (1050 mm) shorter span wing which will raise the cruising speed by 25 mph (41 km/h; 22 kn) but also increase the stall speed by 32%, a retractable undercarriage and a ballistic recovery parachute. Kits will be offered to meet either US Light-Sport Aircraft (LSA) rules or European microlight regulations but flyaway aircraft will be built to LSA rules. Other engines, such as Rotax variants in the 100-115 hp (75-86 kW) power range may be fitted.

In the two years after its first flight in 2007, the Ion prototype flew about 60 hours, some with a Jabiru 3300 six cylinder engine which experienced cooling problems but from May 2009 with a 100 hp (75 kW) Rotax 912ULS flat four engine. In 2010 it appeared at AirVenture, Oshkosh under its own power with a ventral air intake and a new three blade propeller. The second prototype was under construction but not registered in mid-2011. The Ion will not be offered for sale until flight tests are completed.

== Proposed variants ==
Ion 100
Kit, LSA rules, fixed undercarriage.
Ion 105
Kit, US Experimental amateur built rules, retractable undercarriage, short span wings.
Ion 110
Kit, for European rules.
Ion 105
Kit, European microlight rules.
Ion 120
Flyaway, LSA rules.

== Specifications (LSA, Rotax 912ULS, estimated performance) ==
Data from Jane's All the World's Aircraft 2012/13

General characteristics

- Crew: Pilot
- Capacity: 1 passenger
- Length: 24 ft 0 in (7.32 m)
- Wingspan: 32 ft 6 in (9.91 m)
- Height: 6 ft 5 in (1.96 m)
- Fuel capacity: 120 lb (54 kg)
- Useful load: 552 lb (250 kg)
- Powerplant: 1 × Rotax 912ULS Air- and water-cooled flat four, 100 hp (75 kW)
- Propellers: 3-bladed Warp Drive carbon fibre pusher

Performance

- Cruise speed: 152 mph (244 km/h, 132 kn) at 75% power
- Stall speed: 43 mph (69 km/h, 37 kn) flaps down
- g limits: +4.4/-2.2
- Rate of climb: 1,610 ft/min (8.2 m/s) maximum at sea level
- Take-off run: 500 ft (153 m)
