= Itoh Emi 16 =

1920s Japanese biplane aircraft

Emi 16 Fuji-go

General information
- Type: General purpose civil aircraft
- National origin: Japan
- Manufacturer: Itoh Aeroplane Research Studio
- Designer: Tomotari Inagaki
- Number built: 1

History
- First flight: 22 July 1920

The Itoh Emi 16 Fuji-go (Fuji), built in 1920, was intended as a cheap and simple general purpose civil biplane but gained publicity with exhibition flights and successful speed and altitude contests against higher-powered fighter aircraft.

== Design and development ==
Though the Fuji-go was best known for its successes in speed contests, it was designed as a multi-purpose, economical civil aircraft, powered by a war-surplus Le Rhône rotary engine and with a cost kept low by structural simplicities such as wings without sweep or stagger.

It was a two bay biplane with a wooden structure and fabric covering. Its wings had rectangular plans apart from blunted tips, braced together with pairs of parallel interplane struts. Behind the engine the fuselage was rectangular in section with two open cockpits, one under the upper wing and the other for the pilot under its trailing edge, which had a small cut-out to improve the upward field of view. The forward cockpit could carry a passenger or an extra fuel tank to increase the range.

The tail was conventional with a tailplane mounted on top of the fuselage carrying elevators with a cut-out for rudder movement. Both the small fin and generous balanced rudder had polyangular profiles.

The Fuji-go had fixed, conventional landing gear with wheels on an axle between pairs of V-struts mounted on the lower fuselage longerons and a long tailskid mounted below the fin leading edge.

Its first flight was on 22 July 1920.

== Operational history ==
The Fuji-go was soon into competitions, beginning with the First Prize-winning Flight Competition held in August. Flown by Yutichi Goto, it won first prize for altitude and came second in a speed race, covering a route between Funabashi and Chiba at 128 km/h (80 mph; 69 kn). It went on to perform publicity flights over Kyoto and Osaka. It also competed in the Imperial Flying Association's Second Airmail Flying Contest which involved a race between Osaka and Kurume. Since several competitors had much more powerful engines it was decided to reduce drag by cropping the lower wings beyond the first bay, leaving a span of 7.04 m (23.1 ft). This increased the maximum speed by 21%. Goto and the Fuji-go came second, gaining an 8,000 yen prize and beaten only by a SPAD XIII fighter with a 220 hp (160 kW) engine.

After a period of further promotional flights the aircraft returned to competition in May in the 1921 Second Prize-winning Flight Competition. It was flown into third place by Komayoshi Yasuoka.

== Variants ==
Data from Japanese Aircraft 1910-1941 pp. 116–7

Emi 18
powered by a 120 hp (89 kW) Clerget nine cylinder rotary engine. Span 9.50 m (31.2 ft), greater wing area and shorter. One only, 1921.
Emi 19
powered by a 120 hp (89 kW) Turrin nine cylinder rotary engine. Span 9.34 m (30.6 ft) and shorter. One only, 1921.
Emi 20
powered by an 80 hp (60 kW) Le Rhône rotary engine. Span 9.0 m (29.5 ft) and shorter. One only, 1921.

== Specifications (original, uncropped lower wing) ==
Data from Japanese Aircraft 1910-1941

General characteristics

- Crew: One
- Capacity: one passenger
- Length: 6.05 m (19 ft 10 in)
- Wingspan: 9.34 m (30 ft 8 in)
- Height: 2.52 m (8 ft 3 in)
- Wing area: 23.5 m^{2} (253 sq ft)
- Gross weight: 740 kg (1,631 lb)
- Powerplant: 1 × Le Rhône nine cylinder rotary, 89 kW (120 hp)
- Propellers: 2-bladed

Performance

- Maximum speed: 167 km/h (104 mph, 90 kn)
- Time to altitude: 3 min 30 s to 1,000 m (3,300 ft)
