= Itoh Emi 14 =

1920s Japanese biplane aircraft

Emi 14

General information
- Type: Long range aircraft
- National origin: Japan
- Manufacturer: Itoh Aeroplane Research Studio
- Designer: Tomotari Inagaki
- Number built: 1

History
- First flight: Early 1920

The Itoh Emi 14 was a Japanese biplane designed in 1920 for a long distance competitive flight from Tokyo to Osaka and back, which it won. It was also successful at a contest later that summer, before suffering terminal structural failure during aerobatics a few weeks later.

== Design and development ==
Stimulated by 1920 reports of flights from Italy to Japan the Imperial Flying Association launched a long distance contest for Japanese aircraft with a non-stop return trip from Tokyo to Osaka and back, a distance of just over 1,000 km (620 mi; 540 nmi). Four companies prepared designs but only the Nakajama Type 7 and the Itoh Emi 14 were ready when the race was due.

For many early, long distance flights the main design challenge was to ensure the aircraft, heavily loaded with fuel, could become airborne in the distance available. At Susaki the runway was only 600 m (2,000 ft) long, so Inagaki gave the wings an aspect ratio of eight, at the time unusually high, to minimize induced drag. Otherwise, the Emi 14 was a conventional two bay biplane with rectangular plan wings braced together with pairs of vertical, parallel interplane struts. Two parallel pairs of short cabane struts braced the central upper wing to the upper fuselage longerons. The Emi 14, like some other Itoh designs, had overhung ailerons, placed only on the upper wing.

The Emi 14 was powered by a 110 kW (150 hp) Gorham engine in a smoothly-tapered cowling but with its upper half exposed. Its flat, narrow, rectangular radiator was attached edge on and vertically just behind on the port side, where the engine cowling joined a flat-sided fuselage. It was originally designed with two open cockpits and flown from the rear seat, but for the long round trip the forward cockpit was used to hold extra fuel. There was a small, central trailing edge cut-out to improve the pilot's upward field of view. The tailplane was mounted on top of the fuselage and the fin was triangular, with a rounded rudder.

Its fixed undercarriage was of the single axle type, mounted on V-struts from the lower fuselage longerons. During development the Emi 14 had a conventional tailskid but for the challenging contest flight takeoff the tail was raised on a wheeled dolly, dropped as the Emi 14 became airborne.

== Operational history ==
The date of the Emi 14's first flight is not known but it was ready on 21 April 1920, the preset contest date. Both it and the Nakajama Type 7, piloted by Kintaro Iinuma, took off successfully and began the outward leg but Iinuma soon ran into thick fog, became lost and crashed into Mount Tanzawa. He was badly injured but survived. Toyotaro Yamagata, in the Emi 14, continued and completed the 1,013.67 km (629.87 mi; 547.34 nmi) circuit in 6 hr 43, an average speed of 151 km/h (94 mph). The flight was seen as a big step forward in Japan's aeronautical progress. The Itoh Aeroplane Research Studio were awarded a 5000 yen prize and Yamagata received the same amount as a personal reward plus another 600 yen a month for three years, though he did not live to collect much of it.

There was one more competitive flight to come: on 2-3 August 1920 Yamagata flew the Emi 14 in another Imperial Flying Association contest, this time over a route between Funabashi and Chiba, about 16 km (9.9 mi; 8.6 nmi) apart. The Emi 14 won the speed first prize at 137 km/h (74 kn; 85 mph) and the altitude second prize with 3,375 m (11,073 ft). Together these prizes were worth 8000 yen.

At the end of August Yamagata was practising loops for an upcoming display when a wing detached, killing him. No more Emi 14s were built.

== Specifications ==
Data from Japanese Aircraft 1910-1941

General characteristics

- Crew: one or two, according to flight
- Length: 7.17 m (23 ft 6 in)
- Wingspan: 11 m (36 ft 1 in)
- Height: 2.74 m (9 ft 0 in)
- Wing area: 32 m^{2} (340 sq ft)
- Aspect ratio: 8
- Airfoil: U.S.A.-1
- Empty weight: 760 kg (1,676 lb)
- Gross weight: 1,150 kg (2,535 lb)
- Powerplant: 1 × Gorham water-cooled, 110 kW (150 hp)
- Propellers: 2-bladed

Performance

- Maximum speed: 146 km/h (91 mph, 79 kn)
- Endurance: 8 hr
- Time to altitude: 1,000 m (3,300 ft) 4 min 30 s
