= Pasotti =

Pasotti is an Italian surname. Notable people with the surname include:

- Alfredo Pasotti (1925–2000), Italian cyclist
- Giorgio Pasotti (born 1973), Italian actor
- Pierina Pasotti (1902–1996), Argentine geologist, geographer and professor

== See also ==
- Pasotti F.6 Airone, an Italian aircraft
- Pasotti F.9 Sparviero, an Italian aircraft
