= Aviamilano =

Aviamilano Costruzione Aeronautiche
- Company type: Aircraft manufacturer
- Industry: Aviation
- Founded: early 1950s
- Defunct: 1968
- Fate: Liquidated on the death of the Managing Director
- Headquarters: Milan, Italy
- Key people: Mario Vietri - Managing Director / Owmer
- Products: Light aircraft and gliders / sailplanes

Aviamilano Costruzione Aeronautiche was an Italian aircraft manufacturer established in Milan in the early 1950s. It was the original manufacturer of Stelio Frati's Falco light aircraft, although when production did not run as smoothly as Frati liked, he took the design to Aeromere instead. Aviamilano's staple product was the Scricciolo trainer built for the Aero Club d'Italia from 1959 onwards. The firm's final product was another Frati design, the F.250, rights to which were sold to SIAI-Marchetti in 1964. The firm closed in 1968 after the death of its Managing Director and the rights to the few sailplanes then in production were bought by Caproni Vizzola.

== Aircraft ==
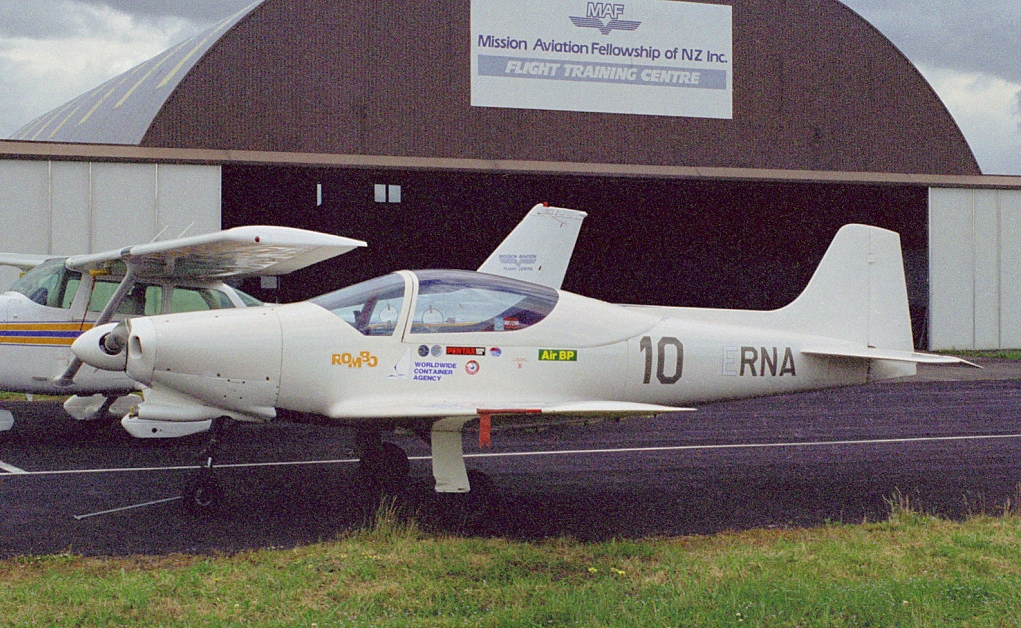
Aviamilano F8L Falco Series 1.

Summary of aircraft built by Aviamilano
Model name	First flight	Number built	Type
CPV1	1963	1	High performance sailplane
A2	1964	5	Standard-class sailplane
A3	1965	1	Open-class sailplane
Falco I	1955	10 (by Avamilano)	High-performance 2-seater touring aircraft
Falco II		1?	High-performance 2-seater touring aircraft
Nibbio	16 January 1958	11	4-seater cabin monoplane
Scricciolo	13 December 1959	51	Light civil training aircraft
F.250	1964	1 (by Avaimilano)	2-seat side-by-side military trainer
F.260	15 July 1964	2 (by Avaimilano), 860+ total	2-seat side-by-side military trainer and light attack aircraft

== See also ==
- List of companies of Italy
