= P59 =

P59, P-59 or P.59 may refer to:

== Aircraft ==
- Bell XP-59, a proposed American fighter aircraft
- Bell P-59 Airacomet, an American jet fighter aircraft
- Partenavia P.59 Jolly, a British prototype training aircraft

== Vessels ==
- HMS Untiring (P59), a submarine of the Royal Navy
- INS Sumitra (P59), a patrol vessel of the Indian Navy
- ORP Sokół (P59), a submarine of the Polish Navy

== Other uses ==
- p59, an alias of GRASP55, a protein
- Papyrus 59, a biblical manuscript
- P59, a state regional road in Latvia
