= Procaer Picchio =

F.15 Picchio
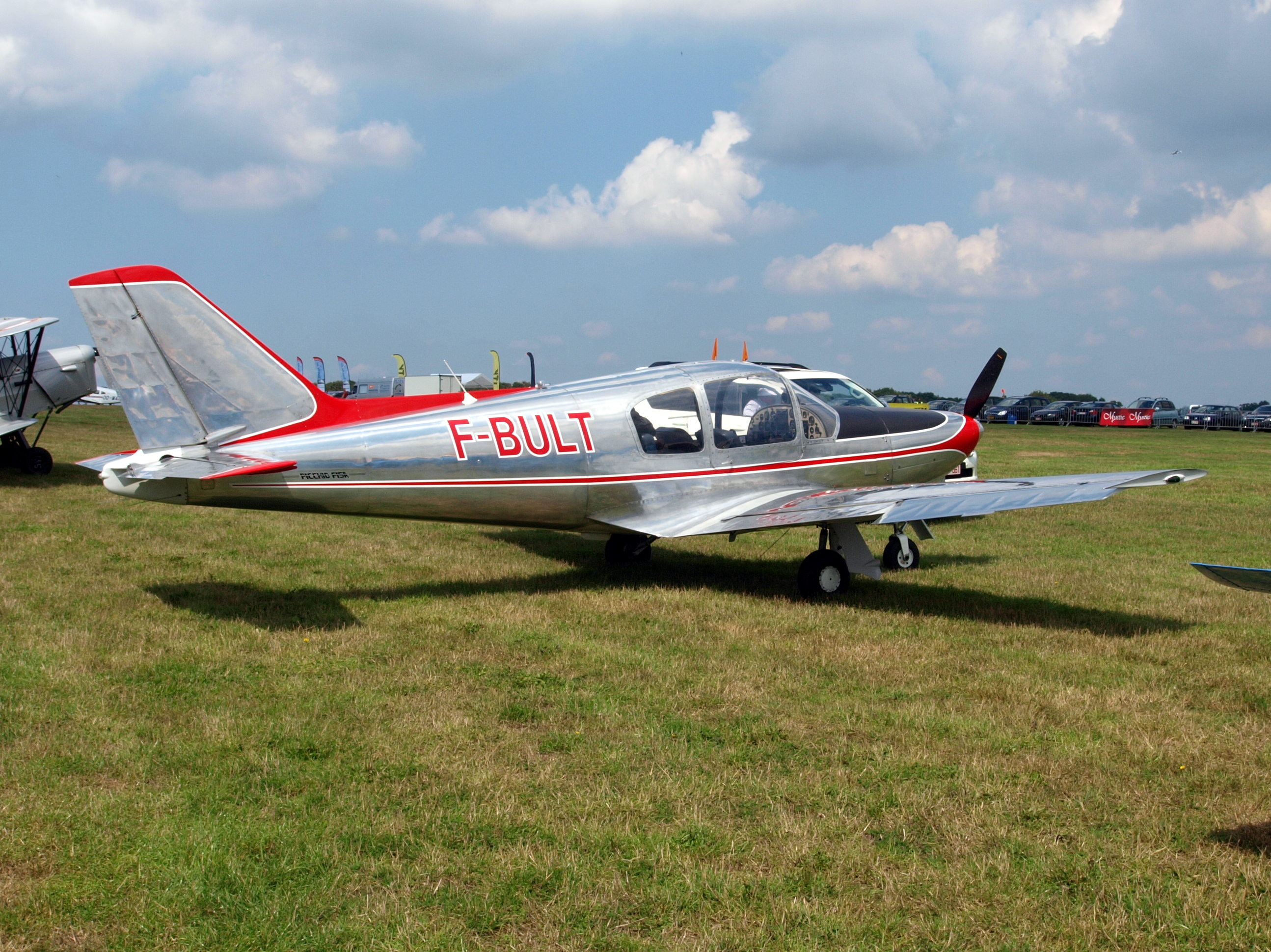
- Procaer F.15A Picchio

General information
- Type: Utility aircraft
- National origin: Italy
- Manufacturer: Procaer, General Avia, Eurospace
- Designer: Stelio Frati
- Primary user: Private Pilot owners
- Number built: c.50

History
- First flight: 7 May 1959

The Procaer F.15 Picchio (Italian: "Woodpecker") is an Italian-designed light utility aircraft built by Procaer (PROgetti Costruzioni AERonautiche).

== Design ==
The Picchio was developed in Italy in the late 1950s as a further development of Stelio Frati's Falco and Nibbio designs. Similar to its predecessors, the Picchio featured a conventional low-wing cantilever monoplane design with exceptionally clean lines and a retractable tricycle undercarriage. Early versions of the Picchio retained the same wooden construction as earlier models but incorporated a thin aluminum skin over the plywood. The F.15E and F.15F, however, were all-metal.

== Production ==
Production of the early, wooden Picchios was carried out by Procaer in Milan, but in the mid 1960s, Frati established General Avia as his own factory to build his designs, commencing with the F.15E. Only a few examples were built, however, and the design lay dormant until revived by an Austrian company, HOAC in the mid 1990s. HOAC arranged to have the two-seat F.15F model built at the JSC Sokol plant in Niznij Novgorod, but ran out of money, leaving Sokol with unsold airframes in various states of completion.

== Operational history ==
The Picchio was primarily intended for operation by private pilot owners and the design was exported to several European countries as well as being purchased by Italian individuals. Several are still airworthy (2012).

== Variants ==
- F.15 - prototype and initial production with 160 hp (120 kW) Lycoming O-320 engine and three seats. 5 built.
- F.15A - revised production version with 180 hp (130 kW) Lycoming O-360 engine and four seats. 10 built by Procaer.

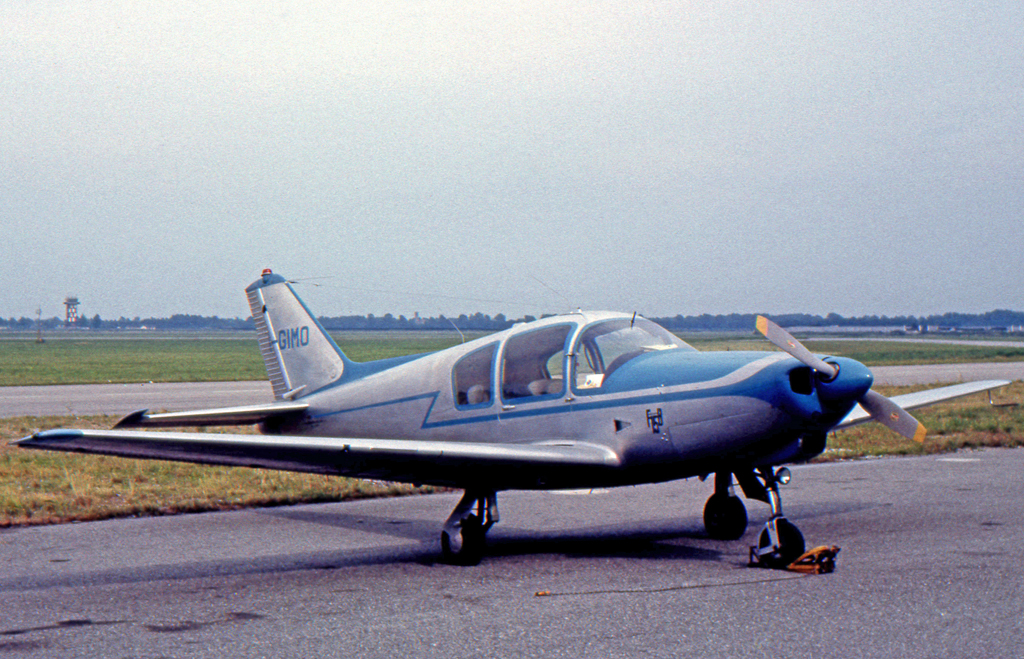
Procaer F.15B Picchio at Milan Linate Airport in 1965

- F.15B - similar to F.15A but with larger-span wings and fuel tanks relocated from fuselage to wings (20 built by Procaer).
- F.15C - version with 260 hp (190 kW) Continental IO-470-E engine and tip tanks. One built.
- F.15D - proposed version similar to F.15B with 250 hp (190 kW) Franklin engine. Not built.
- F.15E Picchio - Four-seat, all metal aircraft with fuel in wing and wing-tip tanks and powered by 300 hp (220 kW) Continental IO-520K engine. First prototype flown 21 December 1968 and second aircraft flown 1976.
- F.15F - All metal, four-seat derivative of F15.E with bubble canopy and powered by 200 hp (150 kW) IO-360 engine. One built by General Avia, flying 20 October 1977.
  - F.15F Excalibur - F.15F built by JSC Sokol at Nizhny Novgorod, Russia for assembly by Eurospace in Italy. Pre-production aircraft assembled by HOAC in Austria and flown in October 1994. Orders for 33 aircraft at end of 1995, with about 100 in various stages of construction or assembly at that time.

== Specifications (F.15B) ==
Data from Jane's All The World's Aircraft 1961–62

General characteristics

- Crew: 1
- Capacity: 3 passengers
- Length: 7.50 m (24 ft 7 in)
- Wingspan: 9.90 m (32 ft 6 in)
- Height: 2.80 m (9 ft 2 in)
- Wing area: 13.30 m^{2} (143.2 sq ft)
- Aspect ratio: 7.37:1
- Airfoil: NACA 64.215/64.210
- Empty weight: 695 kg (1,532 lb)
- Gross weight: 1,150 kg (2,535 lb)
- Fuel capacity: 125 L (33 US gal; 27 imp gal)
- Powerplant: 1 × Lycoming O-360-A1A horizontally opposed, four-cylinder, air-cooled piston engine, 130 kW (180 hp)

Performance

- Maximum speed: 310 km/h (190 mph, 170 kn)
- Cruise speed: 250 km/h (160 mph, 130 kn) at sea level (econ. cruise, 55% power)
- Stall speed: 92 km/h (57 mph, 50 kn) (flaps down, power off)
- Range: 1,600 km (990 mi, 860 nmi)
- Service ceiling: 5,200 m (17,100 ft)
- Rate of climb: 5.1 m/s (1,000 ft/min)
- Takeoff distance to 15 m (50 ft): 505 m (1,657 ft)
- Landing distance to 15 m (50 ft): 400 m (1,312 ft)
