= Aviamilano A2 =

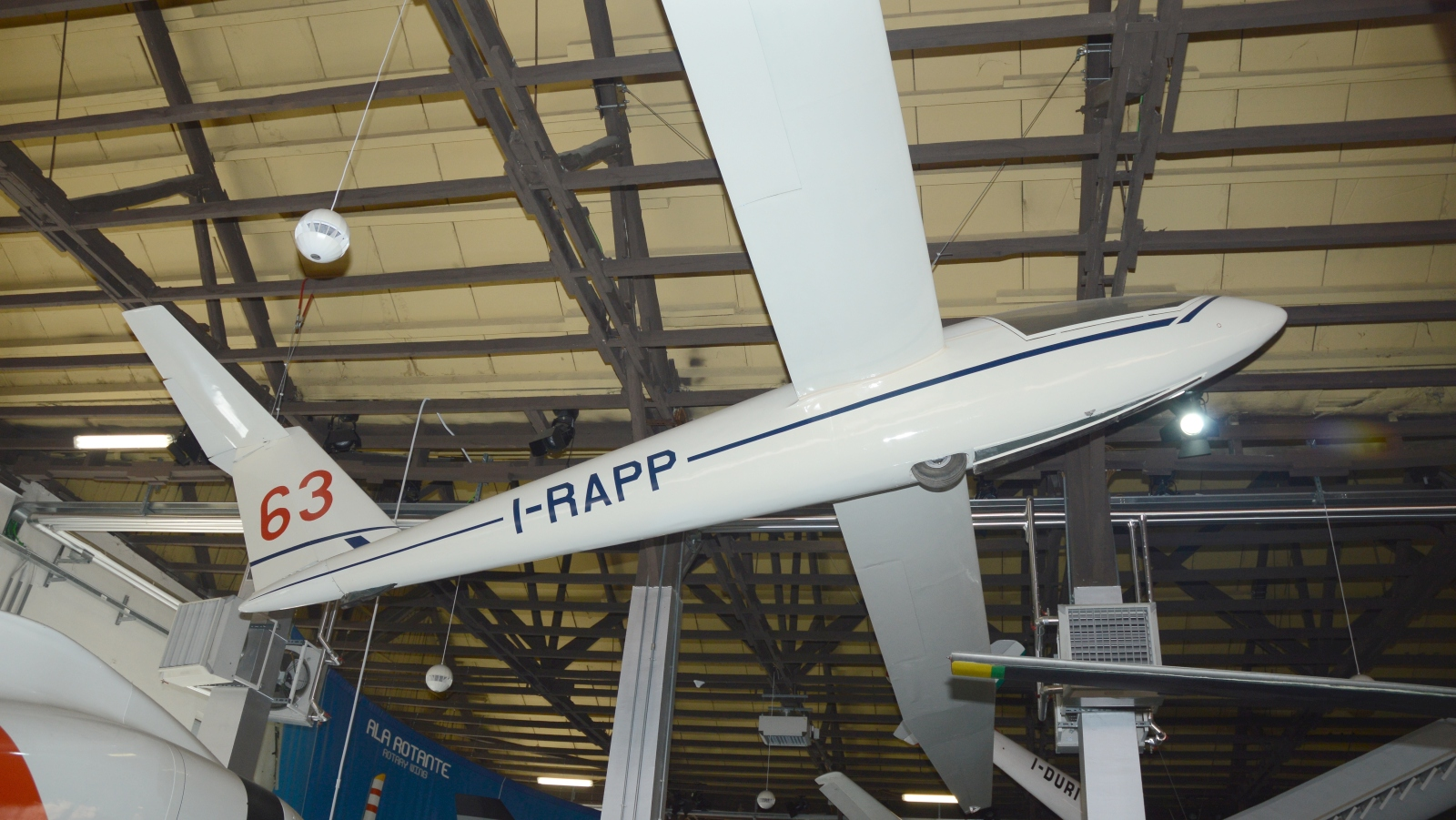
- Aviamilano A3

General information
- Type: Competition sailplane
- National origin: Italy
- Manufacturer: Aviamilano Construzioni Aeronautitche
- Designer: Carlo and Francis Ferrarin and Livio Sonzio
- Number built: 5

History
- First flight: 1964

The Aviamilano A2 or A2 Standard is an Italian high performance Standard Class sailplane first flown in 1964 and returned to production in 1966.

== Design and development ==
The A2 was designed in the early 1960s at the Polytechnic University of Milan by Carlo Ferrarin, his cousin Francis Ferrarin and Livio Sonzio. Their aim was to build a low cost, light weight but high performance glider.

The A2 is a single-seat cantilever mid-wing monoplane, its high-aspect-ratio wing built around an all-metal torsion box and spar. It is skinned with light alloy and has significant dihedral. In plan the wing has a constant chord central section occupying about half the span, with separable straight tapered outer panels. The centre section trailing edges carries air brakes.

Its fuselage is similar to that of the Aviamilano CPV1, with a wooden structure and ovoid cross-section. As before, the rear part is plywood skinned, but the forward part is covered with glass fibre. A long, single, semi-reclining seat cockpit with a single piece canopy following the fuselage contours is placed ahead of the leading edge. Under it, a rubber-sprung landing skid reaches aft to a retractable single wheel under the forward wing. The fuselage tapers rearwards to a T-tail quite different from the CPV1's conventional empennage, with a swept, straight tapered fin and rudder carrying a cantilever, tapered, one-piece all-moving horizontal tail fitted with a central anti-balance tab.

The A2 first flew in 1964 and a short production run began in 1966. In all, five were built, one of which remained on the Italian civil register in 2010.

An Open-class version of the A2 was produced with 18 m (59 ft 1 in) wings as the Aviamilano A3.

== Variants ==
A2 or A2 Standard
15 m span Standard Class.
A3
18 m Open Class version.

== Specifications (Aviamilano A2) ==
Data from Jane's All the World's Aircraft 1966-67 p.394

General characteristics

- Capacity: One
- Length: 7.04 m (23 ft 1 in)
- Wingspan: 15.00 m (49 ft 3 in)
- Wing area: 11.85 m^{2} (127.6 sq ft)
- Aspect ratio: 19
- Airfoil: Wortmann FX-61-163
- Empty weight: 190 kg (419 lb)
- Gross weight: 310 kg (683 lb)

Performance

- Maximum speed: 260 km/h (160 mph, 140 kn) smooth air
- Stall speed: 58 km/h (36 mph, 31 kn)
- Maximum glide ratio: 34:1 best, at 87 km/h (54 mph)
- Rate of sink: 0.62 m/s (122 ft/min) minimum,66 km/h(41 mph) at
- Wing loading: 24.0 kg/m^{2} (4.9 lb/sq ft)
