= General Avia F.22 =

Italian aircraft

F.22 Pinguino
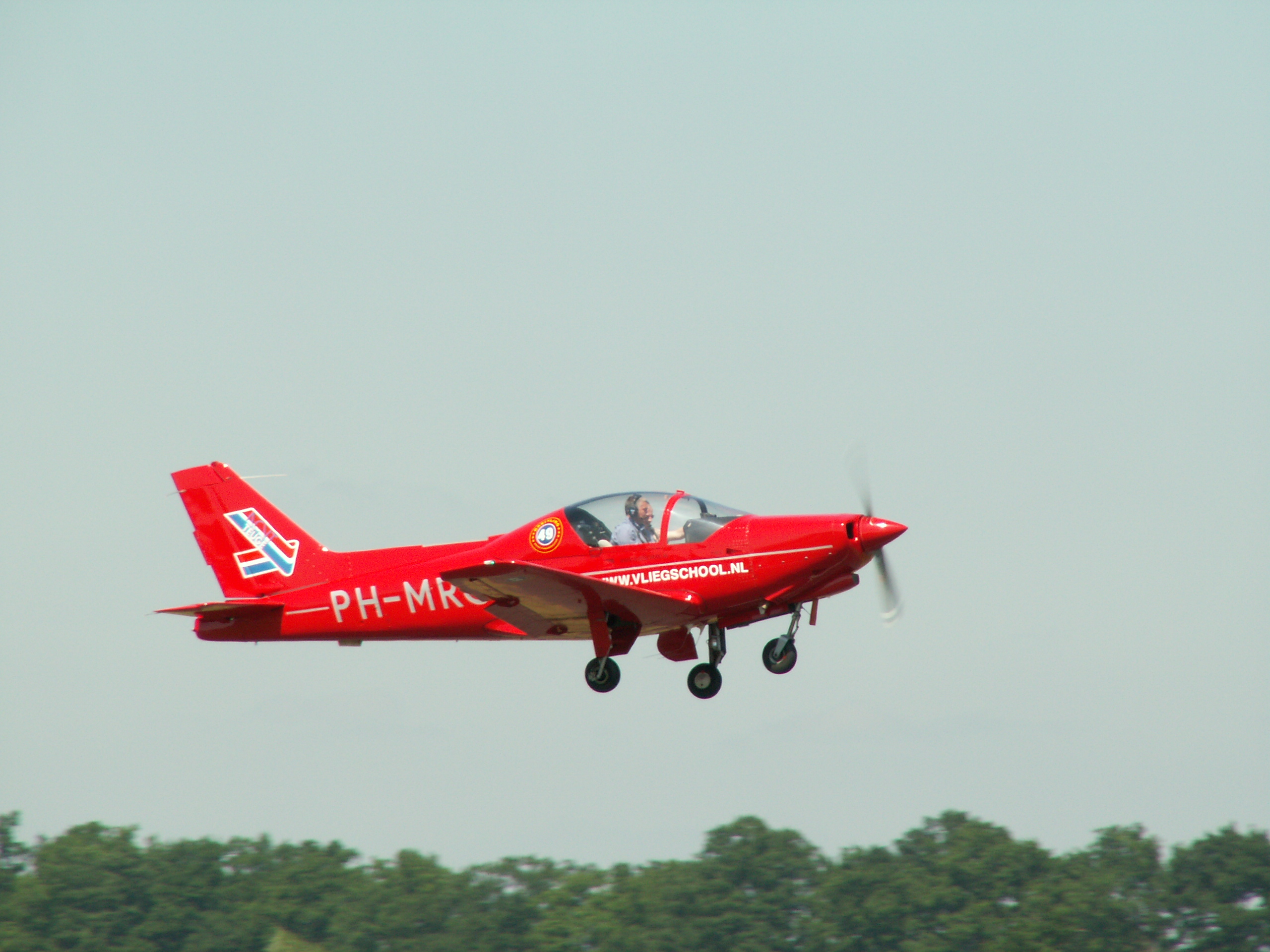
- F.22/C

General information
- Type: Two-seat monoplane
- National origin: Italy
- Manufacturer: General Avia
- Designer: Stelio Frati

The General Avia F.22 Pinguino is an Italian two-seat aircraft by GeneralAvia. The aircraft has two side-by-side seats in an enclosed canopy cockpit. It was the 22nd aircraft designed by Stelio Frati. The aircraft was manufactured in four configurations, as well as a prototype four-seater.

The F.22 is used as a military trainer in several countries. It is aerobatic certified and capable of -3g to +6g maneuvers. The F.22/C model is used by a Dutch aerobatic team called Red Sensation.

After the prototypes were built, about 30 pre-production models were built under the technical direction of Pasquale De Rosa. Mass production began thereafter. De Rosa reduced the production time from about 6000 hours to about 2000 hours after making hundreds of certified changes. The production models of the F.22 are certified in Italy, the United States, the United Kingdom, the Netherlands, France, and New Zealand.

== Specifications F.22/C ==
Data from Brassey's World Aircraft & Systems Directory 1996/97

General characteristics

- Crew: 2
- Length: 7.40 m (24 ft 3 in)
- Wingspan: 8.50 m (27 ft 11 in)
- Height: 2.84 m (9 ft 4 in)
- Wing area: 10.82 m^{2} (116.5 sq ft)
- Aspect ratio: 6.67:1
- Empty weight: 640 kg (1,411 lb)
- Max takeoff weight: 900 kg (1,984 lb)
- Fuel capacity: 160 L
- Powerplant: 1 × Textron Lycoming O-360-A1A air-cooled flat-four, 130 kW (180 hp)

Performance

- Maximum speed: 305 km/h (190 mph, 165 kn)
- Stall speed: 100 km/h (62 mph, 54 kn) with flaps
- Range: 1,400 km (870 mi, 760 nmi)
- Service ceiling: 5,800 m (19,000 ft)
- Rate of climb: 7.50 m/s (1,476 ft/min)

== Variants ==
=== F.22/A ===
This variant has a 116 horsepower (87 kW) Textron Lycoming O-235-N2C engine and 105 litres (28 US gal) fuel tank. It can also come equipped with a retractable undercarriage.

=== F.22/B Pinguino ===
This variant has a 160 horsepower (120 kW) Textron Lycoming O-235-N2C engine and 135 litres (36 US gal) fuel tank. It can also come equipped with a retractable undercarriage.

=== F.22/C Pinguino ===
This is the high-powered variant, as detailed in the specifications section.

=== F.22/R Pinguino-Sprint ===
This variant has a 160 horsepower (120 kW) Textron Lycoming O-320-D1A engine, a constant-speed propeller, and retractable undercarriage.

=== F.220 Airone ===
This is a four-seat prototype of the F.22 with doors and a cabin rather than a sliding canopy. It has a 200 horsepower (150 kW) IO-360-A1A engine and 245 litres (65 US gal) fuel tank. Full development was delayed.

== Bibliography ==
- Taylor, Michael. Brassey's World Aircraft & Systems Directory 1996/97. London:Brassey's, 1996. ISBN 1-85753-198-1.
