= Aviamilano Scricciolo =

P.19 Scricciolo
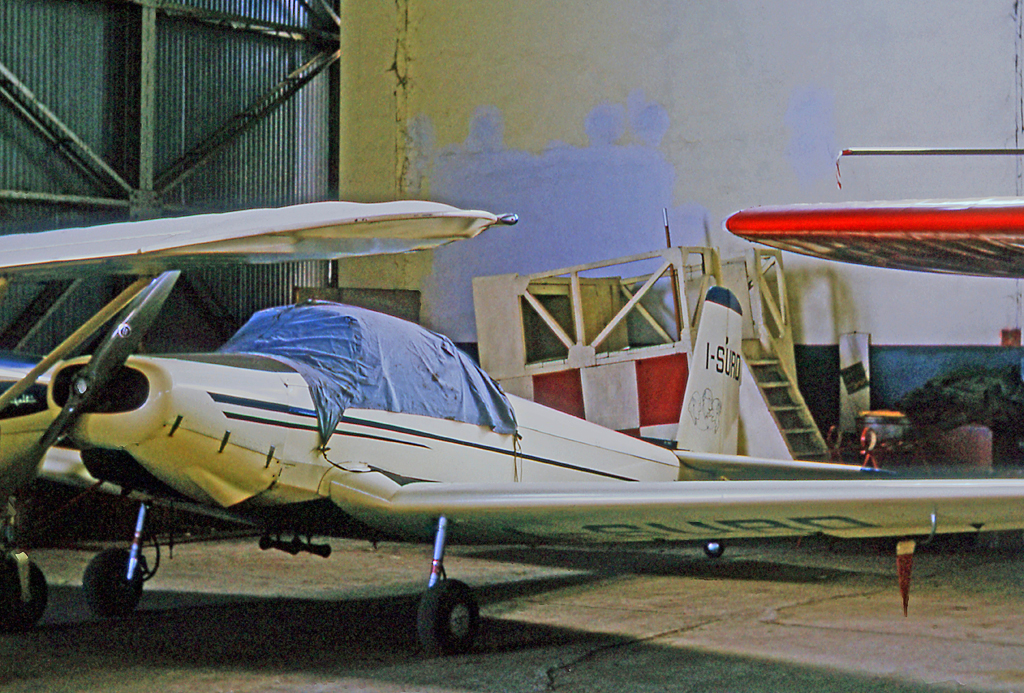
- Aviamilano P.19 Scricciolo at Milan's Bresso general aviation airfield in 1965

General information
- Type: Trainer
- Manufacturer: Aviamilano
- Designer: Ermenegildo Preti
- Primary user: Aero Club d'Italia
- Number built: 50 + 1 prototype

History
- First flight: 13 December 1959

The Aviamilano P.19 Scricciolo (Italian: "Wren") was a light civil trainer aircraft built in Italy in the 1960s.

== Design and development ==
The Scicciolo was designed at the Centro Volo a Vela del Politecnico di Milano to compete in a competition arranged by the Aero Club d'Italia for a light civil trainer. The aircraft was evaluated by the Milan Aero Club. The CVV P.19 emerged victorious and two batches of twenty-five were produced at the Aviomilano factory.

The Scricciolo was a low-wing monoplane with tailwheel undercarriage (although some were fitted with tricycle gear and designated P.19Tr). The pilot and instructor sat side by side under a large bubble canopy. The fuselage was of fabric-covered steel tube construction while the wings and tail surfaces were made of wood with plywood covering.

After 1964, a few examples were fitted with 112 kW (150 hp) Lycoming O-320 engines for use as glider tugs and designated P.19R

== Variants ==
CVV P.19 Scricciolo
The prototype designed and built at the Centro Volo a Vela del Politecnico di Milano for the Aero Club d'Italia competition for a new light civil trainer.
P.19 Scricciolo
The main production version of the Scricciolo
P.19Tr Scricciolo
Production aircraft fitted with tricycle undercarriage.
P.19R
(R - Rimorchio - tug) Rebuild with 150 hp (112 kW) Lycoming O-320 for use as a glider tug.

== Specifications (P.19) ==
Data from Jane's All The World's Aircraft 1965–66

General characteristics

- Crew: 2
- Length: 7.03 m (23 ft 1 in)
- Wingspan: 10.24 m (33 ft 7 in)
- Height: 2.02 m (6 ft 8 in)
- Wing area: 14.0 m^{2} (151 sq ft)
- Aspect ratio: 7.5:1
- Empty weight: 525 kg (1,157 lb)
- Max takeoff weight: 725 kg (1,598 lb)
- Fuel capacity: 95 L (25 US gal; 21 imp gal)
- Powerplant: 1 × Continental O-200-A air-cooled flat-four engine, 75 kW (100 hp)
- Propellers: 2-bladed Sala fixed-pitch propeller, 1.90 m (6 ft 3 in) diameter

Performance

- Maximum speed: 210 km/h (130 mph, 110 kn) at sea level
- Cruise speed: 170 km/h (110 mph, 92 kn) (econ. cruise, 60% power)
- Stall speed: 70 km/h (43 mph, 38 kn) (flaps down)
- Endurance: 5 hr (at 60% power)
- Service ceiling: 3,100 m (10,200 ft)
- Rate of climb: 2.8 m/s (550 ft/min)
- Takeoff distance to 15 m (50 ft): 350 m (1,148 ft)
- Landing distance from 15 m (50 ft): 300 m (984 ft)

== See also ==
Aircraft of comparable role, configuration, and era

- AISA I-11
- Partenavia Jolly
