= Ambrosini Rondone =

Italian light touring monoplane

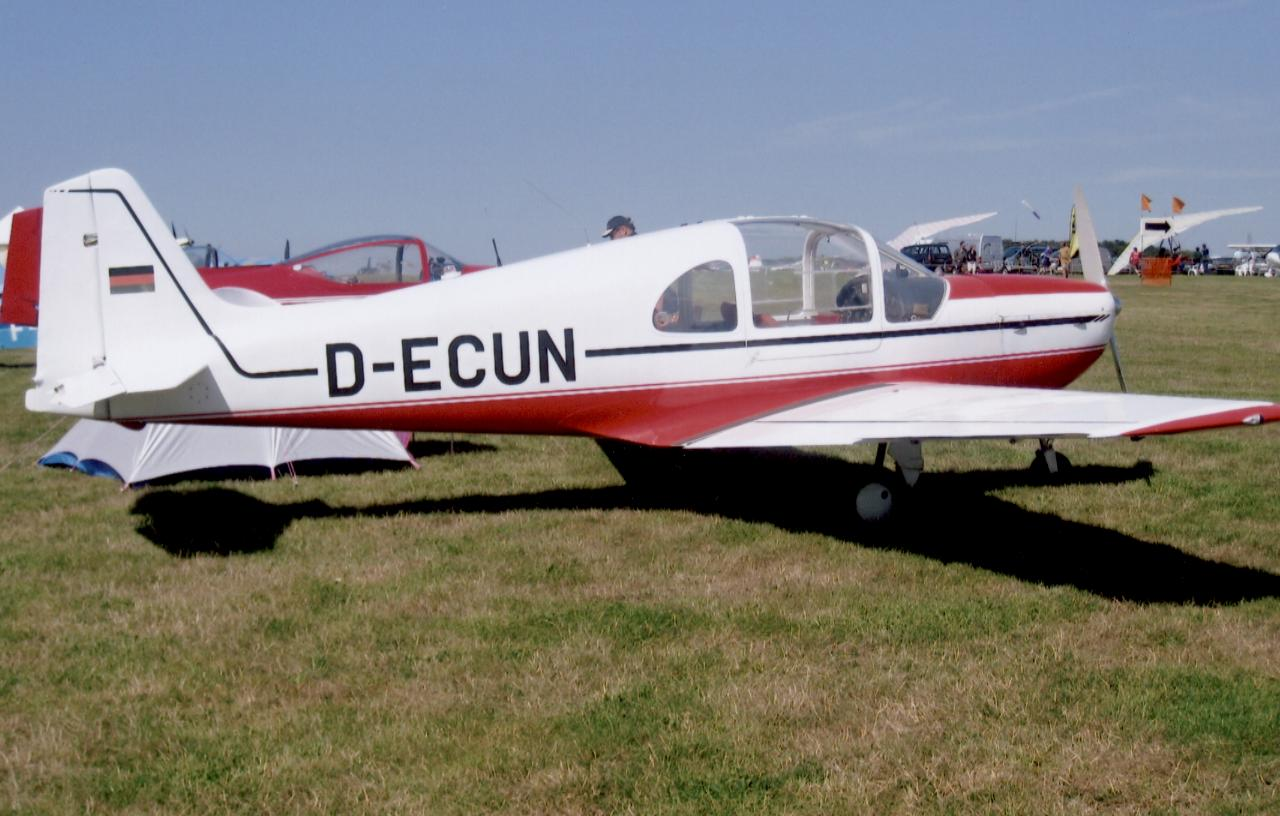
- F.7 Rondone II at an aircraft rally at Schaffen-Diest airfield (Belgium) in August 2009

General information
- Type: Light touring monoplane
- National origin: Italy
- Manufacturer: SAI Ambrosini
- Designer: Ing. Stelio Frati
- Status: Still in service
- Number built: 20

History
- Introduction date: 1951
- First flight: 1951

The Ambrosini Rondone is an Italian-designed two/three-seat light touring monoplane of the early 1950s.

== Development ==
The Rondone was created to satisfy the demand for a more contemporary touring aircraft from Italian private pilots and aero clubs. Stelio Frati prepared the basic design for the prototype two-seat F.4 Rondone I which was built by CVV in 1951. This was followed by nine production examples produced by SAI Ambrosini in collaboration with Aeronautica Lombardi.

The three-seat F.7 Rondone II first flew on 10 February 1954 and the prototype and nine production examples were built for Ambrosini by Legnami Pasotti.

The Rondone is of conventional wooden construction with a plywood-covered one-piece single spar wing and a monocoque fuselage. The tricycle undercarriage is retractable. Two-position flaps and dual controls are fitted. The Rondone II has an extended cabin with additional rear side windows.

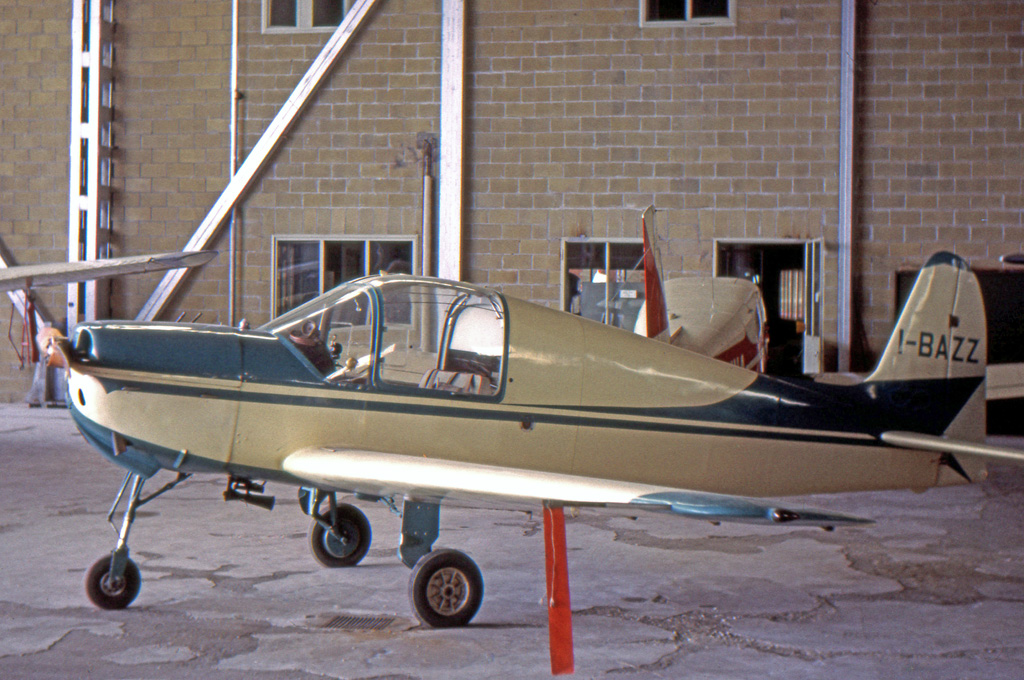
F.4 Rondone I two-seater at Milan Linate airport in 1965

== Operational history ==
The Rondone was initially mainly sold to individuals and clubs in Italy, but examples later served in France and Germany. Several were still operational in 2009.

== Variants ==
F.4 Rondone I prototype
Two-seater with a 65 hp (48 kW) Walter Mikron III. 1 built.
F.4 Rondone I production aircraft
Two-seater with an 85 hp (63 kW) Continental C-85 or 90 hp (67 kW) Continental C-90. 10 built.
F.7 Rondone II
Three-seater with a 90 hp (67 kW) Continental C90 or 135 hp (101 kW) Lycoming O-290-D2 engine. 10 built from new plus one converted from a F.4. Some were later fitted with a 100 hp (75 kW) Continental O-200 engine.

== Specifications (F.7 Rondone II with Lycoming engine) ==
Data from Jane's All the World's Aircraft 1956-57

General characteristics

- Crew: 1
- Capacity: 3 passengers (Lycoming engine)
- Length: 6.80 m (22 ft 4 in)
- Wingspan: 9.30 m (30 ft 6 in)
- Height: 2.26 m (7 ft 5 in)
- Wing area: 10.6 m^{2} (114 sq ft)
- Aspect ratio: 6.6
- Empty weight: 530 kg (1,168 lb)
- Gross weight: 900 kg (1,984 lb)
- Fuel capacity: 142 L (37.5 US gal; 31.2 imp gal) in three fuselage tanks
- Powerplant: 1 × Lycoming O-290-D2 4-cylinder air-cooled horizontally-opposed piston engine, 101 kW (135 hp)
- Propellers: 2-bladed fixed-pitch propeller

Performance

- Maximum speed: 265 km/h (165 mph, 143 kn)
- Cruise speed: 233 km/h (145 mph, 126 kn)
- Stall speed: 75 km/h (47 mph, 40 kn)
- Range: 700 km (430 mi, 380 nmi)
- Service ceiling: 4,500 m (14,800 ft)
- Rate of climb: 4.3 m/s (850 ft/min)
- Wing loading: 68 kg/m^{2} (14 lb/sq ft)
- Power/mass: 0.0786 kW/kg (0.0478 hp/lb)
- Take-off run: 130 m (427 ft)
- Landing run: 100 m (328 ft)
