= SIAI-Marchetti SF.260 =

1964 sportplane family by SIAI-Marchetti

SF.260
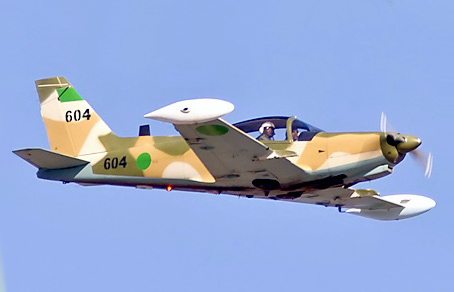
- A SF.260 of the Libyan Air Force

General information
- Type: Trainer/Light attack
- Manufacturer: SIAI-Marchetti; Aermacchi; Alenia Aermacchi; Leonardo S.p.A.
- Designer: Stelio Frati
- Status: In service
- Primary users: Italian Air Force Libyan Air Force; Philippine Air Force; Belgian Air Force
- Number built: 900 (2012)

History
- Manufactured: 1964–2017
- Introduction date: April 1966 (FAA certification)
- First flight: 15 July 1964

The SIAI-Marchetti SF.260 (now Leonardo SF-260) is an Italian light aircraft which has been commonly marketed as a military trainer and aerobatics aircraft.

The SF.260 was designed by Italian aircraft designer Stelio Frati, while production work was originally performed by Milan-based aviation manufacturer Aviamilano. On 15 July 1964, the first prototype performed its maiden flight, then designated F.260. Shortly after, responsibility for production was transferred to SIAI Marchetti, who purchased the rights to the design. Manufacturing continued to be performed by this firm until the company was bought by Aermacchi in 1997.

The SF.260 has been largely sold to military customers as a trainer and light combat aircraft. There have been limited civil sales to private operators. In the late 1960s, the type was marketed in the United States under the name Waco Meteor. Armed military versions, sold as the SF.260W Warrior, proved to be popular with smaller air forces, which could arm the type for use in the close air support role. Both piston-powered and turboprop-powered models have been developed.

== Development ==
=== Origins ===
In the early 1960s, Italian aircraft designer Stelio Frati commenced work on a new three-seat aerobatic design, which was primarily intended to serve as a sport aircraft. Unlike many of its peers of the era, it was developed to possess aerobatic capabilities akin to contemporary combat aircraft, as well as being equipped for instrument flight rules (IFR) flight. This design drew heavily upon his previous projects, including the jet-powered Caproni Trento F-5 prototype trainer and the Falco F8L twin-seat aerobatic aircraft, sharing the same wing and a similar structure to the Falco. The envisioned aircraft, initially designated as the F.250 due to the horsepower of its engine, was Frati's first all-metal aircraft.

On 15 July 1964, it performed its maiden flight. In the aftermath of the maiden flight, prime responsibility for the type's manufacture was acquired from Aviamilano by SIAI Marchetti, which had purchased the rights to the design outright. Shortly after entering production, the SF.260 found itself in high demand by military customers, who often adopted it interchangeably as a military trainer or as a lightweight ground-attack aircraft. Between 1964 and 1984, the majority of customers were military, while a small number of private pilots had been able to obtain a few, although supply in this respect was constrained.

In the late 1960s, the aircraft was marketed in the United States market as the Waco Meteor, although it had no connections of any form with the Waco Aircraft Company. The venture was relatively unsuccessful. In the late 1970s and 1980s, American airline pilot Frank Strickler became a major reseller, being credited with re-launching civil sales of the SF.260 in the region, acquiring them from SIAI Marchetti in small batches and individually selling them on to US-based customers.

=== Further development ===
In the late 1970s, an improved model of the SF.260A, designated as the SF.260C, had replaced it in production. This model featured various improvements, including redesigned tabs on the ailerons, a strengthened wing, a re-profiled aerofoil for improved low-speed handling, and an elongated tail/rudder. The SF.260C was designed for compliance with the requirements of military specifications. The only structural difference between the SF.260C and its armed brethren, the SF.260W Warrior and SF.260SW Sea Warrior, is the presence of underwing hardpoints for attaching equipment and armaments.

In 1980, SIAI Marchetti performed the first flight of a turboprop-powered SF.260TP, powered by an Allison Model 250 engine flat-rated at 350 shp. This variant was marketed towards the military trainer market, which soon adopted the type. In August 1986, Gates Learjet was approached by SIAI Marchetti to modify the SF.260TP for it to be compliant with the requirements of Federal Aviation Administration's (FAA) FAR Part 23, allowing it to be certified for civil use. Modifications were made to achieve lower stall speed and greater payload capacity. These performance improvements were principally achieved through aerodynamic alterations, such as the adoption of 'shark's teeth' along the wing's leading edge.

In 1991–1992, SIAI-Marchetti proposed an updated SF.260, with an enlarged cockpit canopy and a revised fuel system to meet the United States Air Force's Enhanced Flight Screener competition. While the bid was unsuccessful, with the Slingsby T67 Firefly being preferred, it formed the basis for future production, as the fuel injected SF.260E and the normally aspirated SF.260F. In 2005, a batch of thirty SF.260EA were delivered to the Italian Air Force, for a total price of €33 million ($40 million). This model, which had been specially developed to meet an Italian Air Force requirement for an advanced piston-engine aircraft, is used for screening and principal training activities.

In 2010, Philippine Aerospace Development Corporation obtained license production for 18 units of SF 260 TP single-engine turbo prop trainers for the Philippine Air Force, which were delivered in 2011.

Production of the SF.260 continued at a low rate until 2017. A total of 976 aircraft, including prototypes, were built.

== Design ==
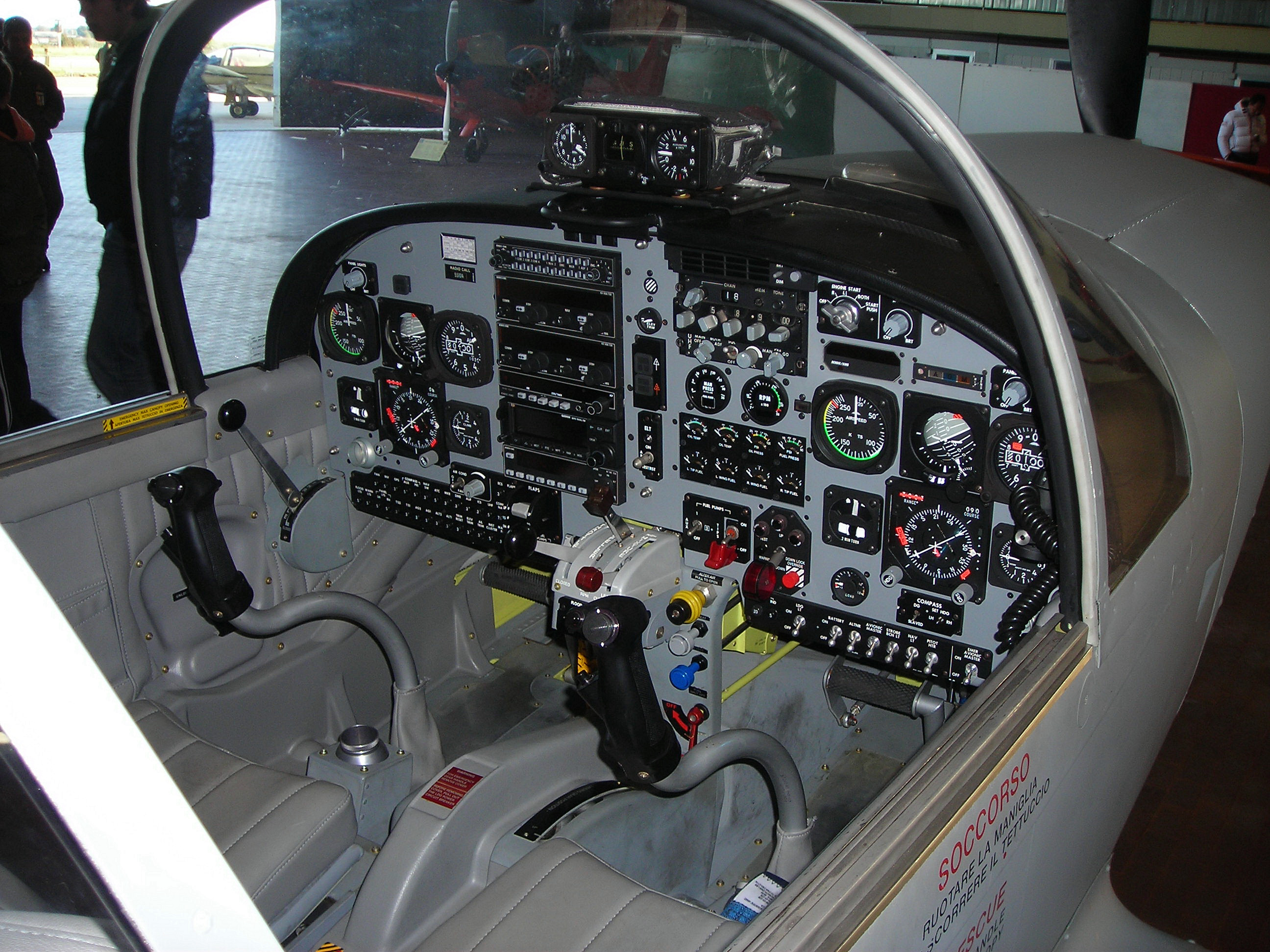
A cockpit of a SF.260

The SIAI-Marchetti SF.260 is a low-mounted cantilever wing monoplane, complete with a retractable tricycle undercarriage. It has been often praised for its sleek lines and sporty aesthetic appearance, while maintaining function as well, possessing jet-like handling as a result. The construction is typically known for having a high level of workmanship, while exterior is extensively flush-riveted to reduce aerodynamic drag, except for a few locations such as the flaps and some fairings. The SF.260 has a compact, dense structure which possesses ballistics similar to a jet aircraft, and is approved to perform aerobatic manoeuvres. In comparison to most single-engine aircraft, it possesses superior power loading and above average wing loading.

The original model of the SF.260 was powered by a single Lycoming O-540 engine, capable of providing 260 hp. The standard engine made use of a carburetor, while a fuel injected engine was available as an optional extra. The SF.260 has been described as having the power to be immune to the gyration-like effects of turbulence and possessing a high rate of climb. During the 1980s, aerospace publication Flying stated the SF.260 to be: "the fastest normally aspirated piston single in production".

The SF.260 holds the airspeed records for aircraft in its class over the 100 km (62 mi) and 1,000 km (620 mi) closed circuits. Later-built models often made use of turboprop engines. The initial model to be equipped as such, designated as the SF.260TP, was powered by a single Allison Model 250 engine, flat-rated at 350 shp.

The pilot and up to two passengers (or pilot and one student in trainer versions) are accommodated under a broad, extensively glazed canopy. The pilot, who accesses the aircraft via purpose-built walkways along the wing, would be typically seated on the right-hand side of the cockpit; military pilots are trained to control the aircraft using their right hand on the stick and their left on the throttle.

While being a fully aerobatic aircraft, it possesses favourable handling qualities, including relatively tame stall characteristics. Controllability during stalls is augmented by vanes located on the wing tip tanks which accelerate airflow over the tips and ailerons. The SF.260 is a relatively fast aircraft, complete with responsive controls; as a product of the latter, pilots need to maintain awareness of speed dips, although ample aerodynamic warning is typically present. Piston-engined and turboprop-engined SF.260 models generally share similar handling and flight performance. Speed limitations on the landing gear has been highlighted as a negative attribute. In order to safely perform aerobatics, the rear seat has to be unoccupied and the tip tanks must be empty of fuel prior to commencing any such manoeuvers, reducing the SF.260's flight endurance to roughly one and a half hours.

== Operational history ==
=== Burkina Faso ===
This small air force operated six Warriors these Warriors were sold from the Philippines via Belgium in 1986, and were complemented by other four new Warriors coming directly from Italy, and employed during the Agacher Strip War with Mali in 1986. These aircraft were in service with Escadrille de Chasse ("Fighter Squadron") in the Force Aérienne du Burkina Faso (FABF), the Burkina Faso Air Force.

=== Chad ===
Chad informed the United Nations that, during the conflict with Libya, it had destroyed eight Libyan Air Force SF.260WLs and captured nine others, besides destroying and capturing other equipment. As many as six former Libyan SF.260WLs may have been pressed into service with Chad's Air Force. By 1988, four SF.260Ws were identified as being in service, two of them were overhauled one year later in France.

In November 2006, Libya supplied Chad with four SF.260W aircraft, including crew, due to tensions between Chad and Sudan over the Darfur area. One newly supplied SF.260W was shot down on 28 November – its first mission in Chad – by rebel forces, killing the crew.

=== Libya ===
Libya was a major customer of the SIAI Marchetti SF.260 with an order of 240 SF.260WLs. The first 60 aircraft were manufactured in Italy, while the others were delivered as knock-down kits, and assembled in a new plant in Sebha, under the supervision of Italian technicians.

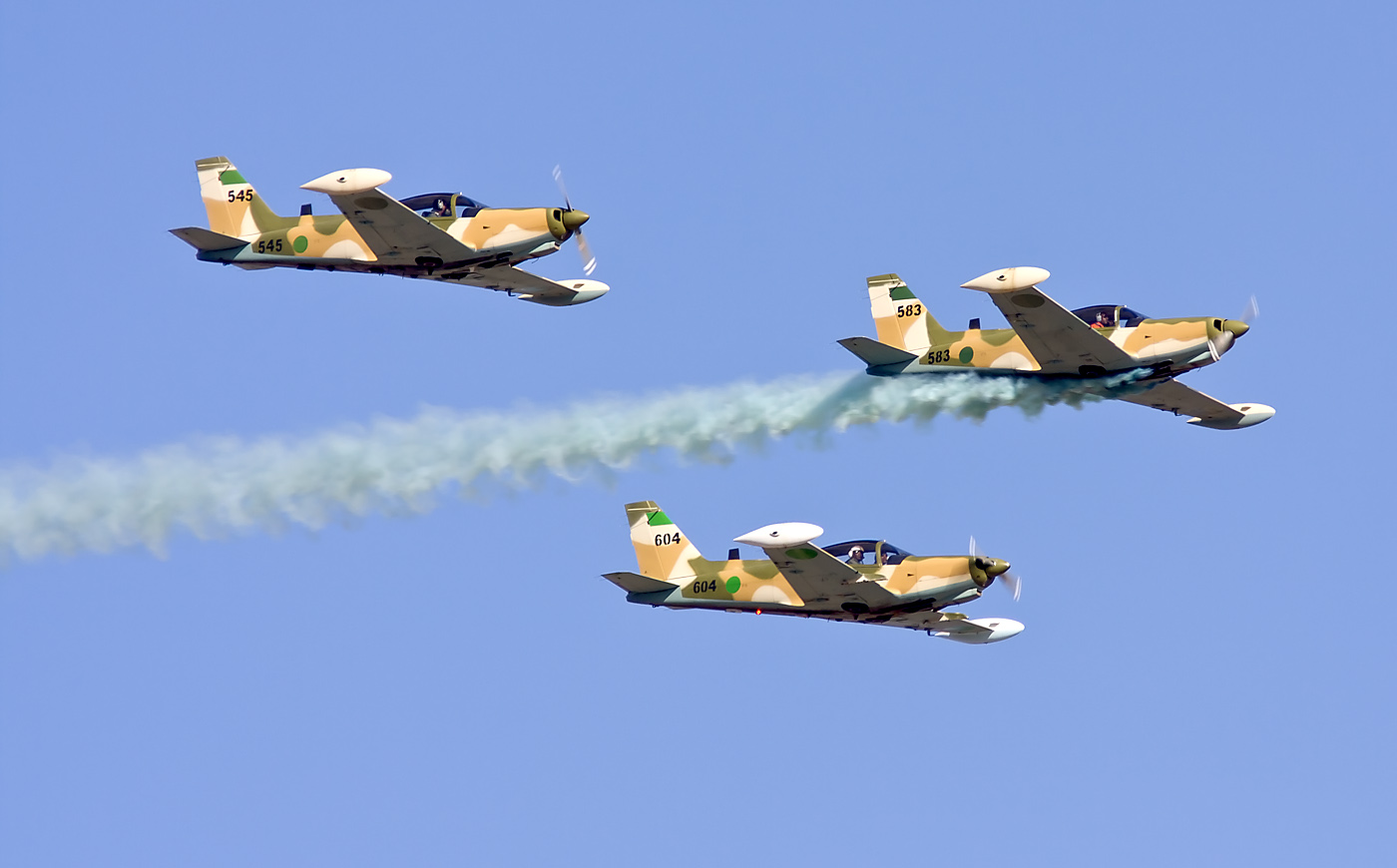
A formation of three Libyan SF.260s in flight, 2009

The SF.260WL was intended for pilot training, but was also used for ground support during the war in Chad. Dozens of Italian pilots served as instructors for Libyan cadets from 1977. Their number decreased in 1982, as they were supplemented by a group of 15 Libyan instructors, who had been trained at SIAI Marchetti's facilities in Italy. Libyan SF.260s played an important role during the country's involvement in Chad. They were used as light ground attack aircraft, using machine gun pods, rockets and bombs. Their first known actions took place in February 1978, when they participated in air strikes on the Chadian army garrison of Faya-Largeau together with Mil Mi-25 helicopters. As a result of the sustained bombardment, the majority of the 5,000 troops deployed there fled, and around 1,500 of them were taken prisoners on February 18.

Gaddafi finally succeeded in installing a generally pro-Libyan government in N'Djamena in 1979 (the Transitional Government of National Unity or GUNT). However, the new Chadian defence minister, Hissène Habré, was fiercely anti-Libyan, and immediately started distancing himself from the rest of the government. This culminated in Habré's forces taking N'Djamena on 1 April 1980. Pro-Libyan factions fled to Libya, where they were reorganized and re-armed. These forces came back to Chad in October of the same year, together with the Islamic Legion. Once again, SF.260s were involved in heavy airstrikes on Faya-Largeau, together with Mi-25 helicopters, Mirage 5s and Tupolev Tu-22s. The quasi-continuous bombardment, which lasted for almost a week, had a big impact on the morale of the defenders. Hence, the pro-Libyan GUNT forces easily took control of Faya-Largeau in early November 1980.

After continuing the advance towards the south, by late November, pro-Libyan units had reached Dougia, only 60 kilometres north of N'Djamena. Libyan SF.260s were forward-deployed there, together with Mi-25s. On 8 December, these aircraft, joined on 12 December by Tu-22 bombers, D-30 howitzers, and M-46 field guns, started attacking N'Djamena. The week-long bombing caused a huge amount of destruction in the Chadian capital, and a number of civilian casualties that remains unknown today. After Habré fled to Cameroon, resistance collapsed and his surviving fighters escaped to Sudan.

In August 1981, Gaddafi ordered the Libyan Arab Air Force to attack Habré's bases inside Sudan. On 16 September, a SF.260 was shot down by ground fire near Junaina in the Darfur region of Sudan; both crew members were killed.

In May 1982, Habré's forces came back to Chad from their Sudanese bases, and in June 1982 they expelled the GUNT from the capital N'Djamena. Once again, its chief Goukouni Oueddei had to flee to Libya with his remaining forces. After another Libyan/GUNT offensive in 1983, France launched Operation Manta, resulting in a general stalemate that lasted until 1986; pro-Libyan GUNT forces retained control of the northern parts of the country. In February 1986, a new attack was launched towards the south, supported by SF.260s and helicopters. This offensive collapsed after only four days.

Libyan SF.260s were used in the last phase of the conflict in Chad, the Toyota War, which started in December 1986. In February 1987, SF.260s were involved in attacks against FANT columns active in the area north of Faya-Largeau, using unguided rockets. Chadian MANPADS teams armed with FIM-43 Redeyes and 9K32 Strela-2s claimed to have shot down one LAAF SF.260 on 14 March near Fada. Five days later, when Chadian forces ambushed a Libyan armoured column, another SF.260 was shot down, either by Chadian-operated Redeyes or by FIM-92 Stingers operated by a French special forces team from the 11e régiment parachutiste de choc.

Twelve SF.260s were lost when Chadian forces overran the airfield at Ouadi Doum on 21 March, including five captured intact. In an attempt to destroy as much of the captured equipment as possible, the Libyans heavily bombed the airfield from the air until late April. SF.260s were involved in these attacks. On 29 March, an SF.260 was claimed shot down by Chadian MANPADS north of Zouar. In 1988, as Chad and Libya were negotiating a settlement for the conflict, pro-Libyan insurgents were infiltrated into Sudan, from where they started attacking garrisons inside Chad. They were often supported by SF.260s, and one of these was shot down on 28 November, and its crew captured.

The Libyan government supported friendly countries with arms, and several SF.260Ws were handed over to air forces such as those of Burkina Faso, Burundi, Nicaragua, Uganda and possibly others. In 1987 Chad reported to the United Nations the destruction of eight SF.260s and the capture of nine others during its border war with Libya; some of these secondhand Libyan aircraft may even have found their way onto the US market.

Alenia Aermacchi refurbished twelve SF.260 primary trainers for the Libyan Air Force; the work was performed jointly by Alenia Aermacchi and Tripoli-based Libyan-Italian Advanced Technology. The work included overhaul of the airframes and systems, including propellers and engines. Work began in late 2007 and ran through 2008.

During the civil war, on May 7, 2011, this aircraft (along with a formation of pro-Gaddafi planes) was probably involved in a successful air raid over the rebel-held fuel depots at Misrata, setting them on fire. NATO failed to intercept the flight, despite the introduction of a no-fly zone over Libya in March. At the beginning of the uprising, one aircraft was crushed under a tank during a rebel attack on Misrata air base.

As of 2013, at least six airframes are still in service with the new Libyan Air Force and are involved in patrols and possibly airstrikes against smugglers in the porous and remote borders.

=== Nicaragua ===
At least seven SF.260WLs were received by the Fuerza Aérea Sandinista as support from Libya in 1984–1985. They may have been used in the COIN role against the Contras and in the pilot training role. No further details are known. Three SF.260s surfaced in the USA on the secondhand market, a fourth is slowly being rebuilt in Guatemala. No longer in service.

=== Philippines ===
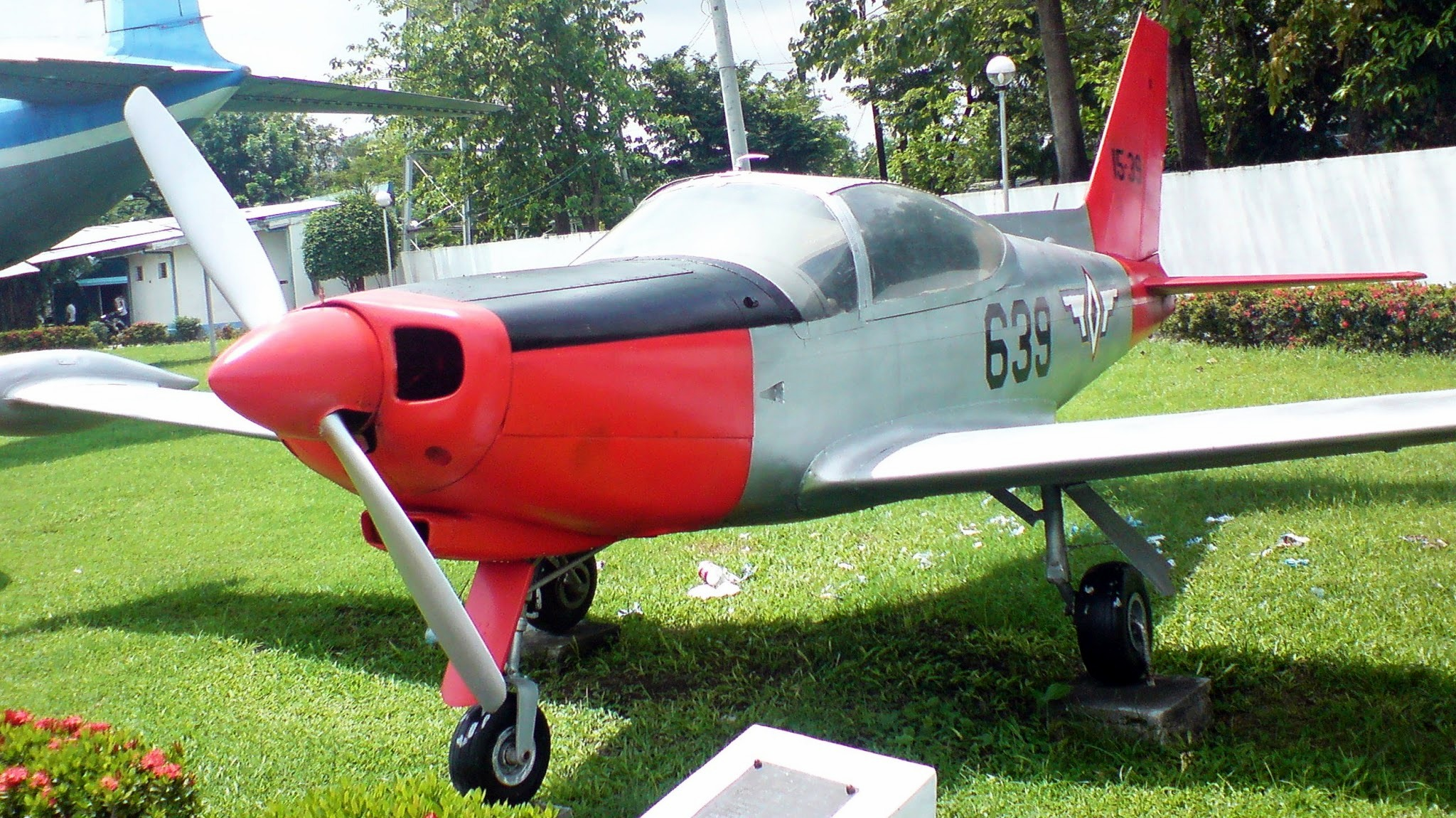
A preserved Philippine SF.260

In the early 1970s, an order was placed for 48 SF.260s (32 SF.260M; 16 SF.260W). The first six were delivered in May 1973, replacing the Beech T-34A Mentor with 100th Training Wing at Fernando Air Base.

The 15th Strike Wing on airbase Sangley Point received the SF.260W Warrior as an addition to the North American T-28 Trojans. They were possibly used in combat against rebel forces in the south of the Philippines. But little is known about its service life. In the early 1980s, the surviving Warriors were disarmed and transferred to the training role with 100th Training Wing.

The Philippines Air Force signed with Agusta a contract for the delivery of 18 SF.260TP turboprops on 31 December 1991, replacing the SF.260M/W in the training role. The first SF.260TP was noted in country on 1 July 1993.

Under "Project Layang", the Philippines Air Force plans to upgrade 18 SF.260M/W aircraft to the SF.260TP standard, by replacing the Lycoming piston engine with the Allison 250-B17D turboprop engine and newer avionics. The first upgraded SF.260 was delivered in 1996, no further details are available.

The Philippines has finalized a deal with Alenia Aermacchi for 18 new-build SF.260F primary/basic trainers. All 18 were delivered by Aermacchi Italy which was locally assembled by Aerotech Industries Philippines by April 2011.

Six Warriors were sold to Burkina Faso via Belgium in 1986.

=== Rhodesia ===
Despite an arms embargo, two batches of SF.260 aircraft were delivered in 1977. Because of the embargo, several buying teams travelled the world looking for suitable equipment. Through various routes, 17 SF.260C and 14 SF.260W aircraft arrived, the former to be used in the training role, while the warriors were being used for light attack duties and escort of convoys. In 1984–85, reportedly eight SF.260Ws were converted to SF.260TP standard by replacing the piston engine with a turboprop engine.

=== Sri Lanka ===
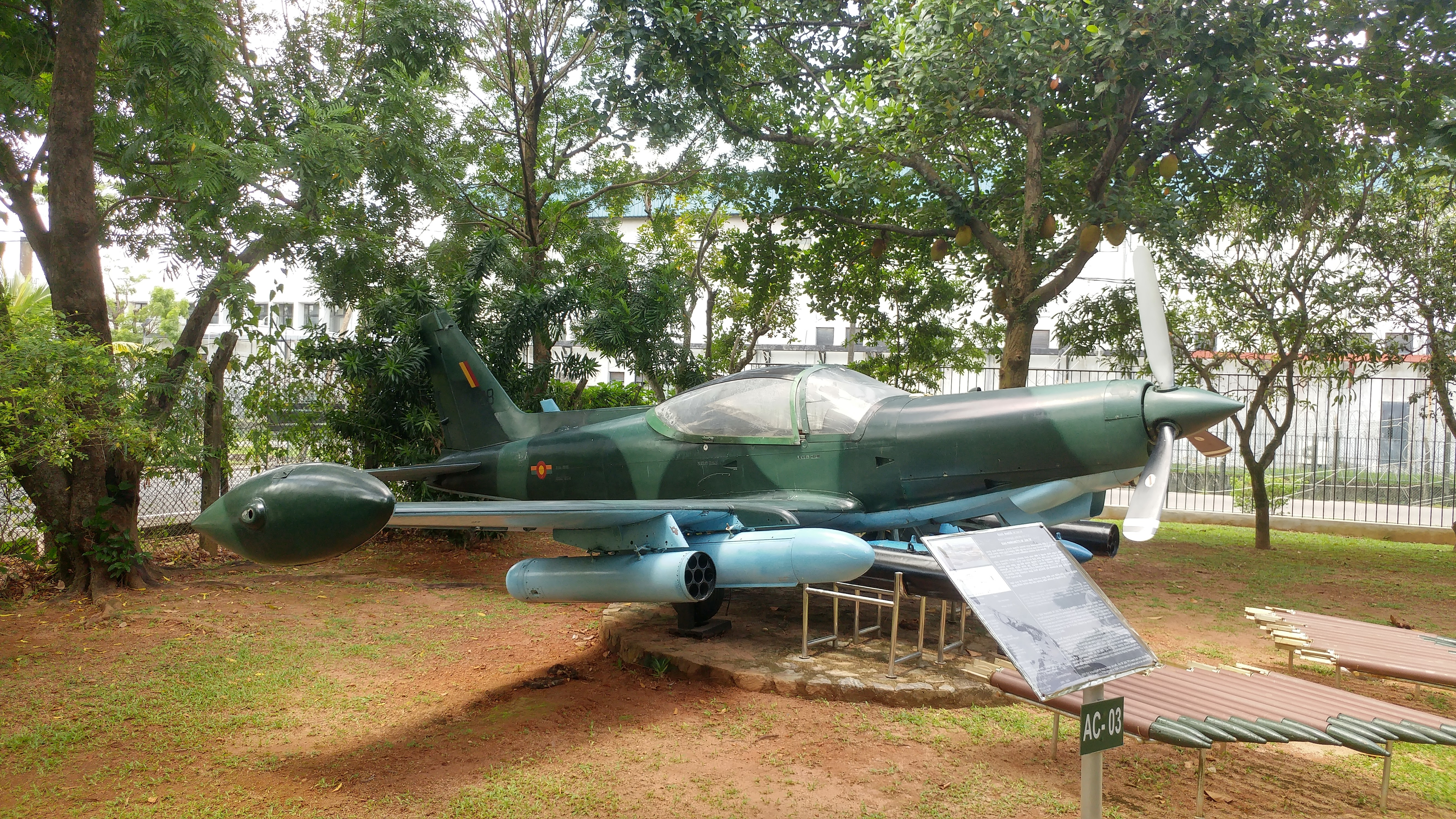
Sri Lanka Air Force Museum SLAF SIAI-Marchetti on display

Six SF.260TPs were delivered to the Sri Lanka Air Force (SLAF) in 1985, to be used in the pilot training role, although they were later brought into the government's effort to subdue the Tamil Tigers. Two former factory demonstration aircraft were delivered in 1986 to replace lost aircraft, added by three new built aircraft in 1988. All SF.260 aircraft are based with No. 1 Flying Training Wing on the airbase SLAF Anuradhapura. The SF.260TP fleet was expanded in 1990–91 with the delivery of twelve former Myanmar SF.260Ws. The SF.260W fleet was withdrawn from use in 2001, being replaced by Chinese Nanchang PT-6 aircraft. The SF.260TP fleet was also retired a few years later.

=== Turkey ===
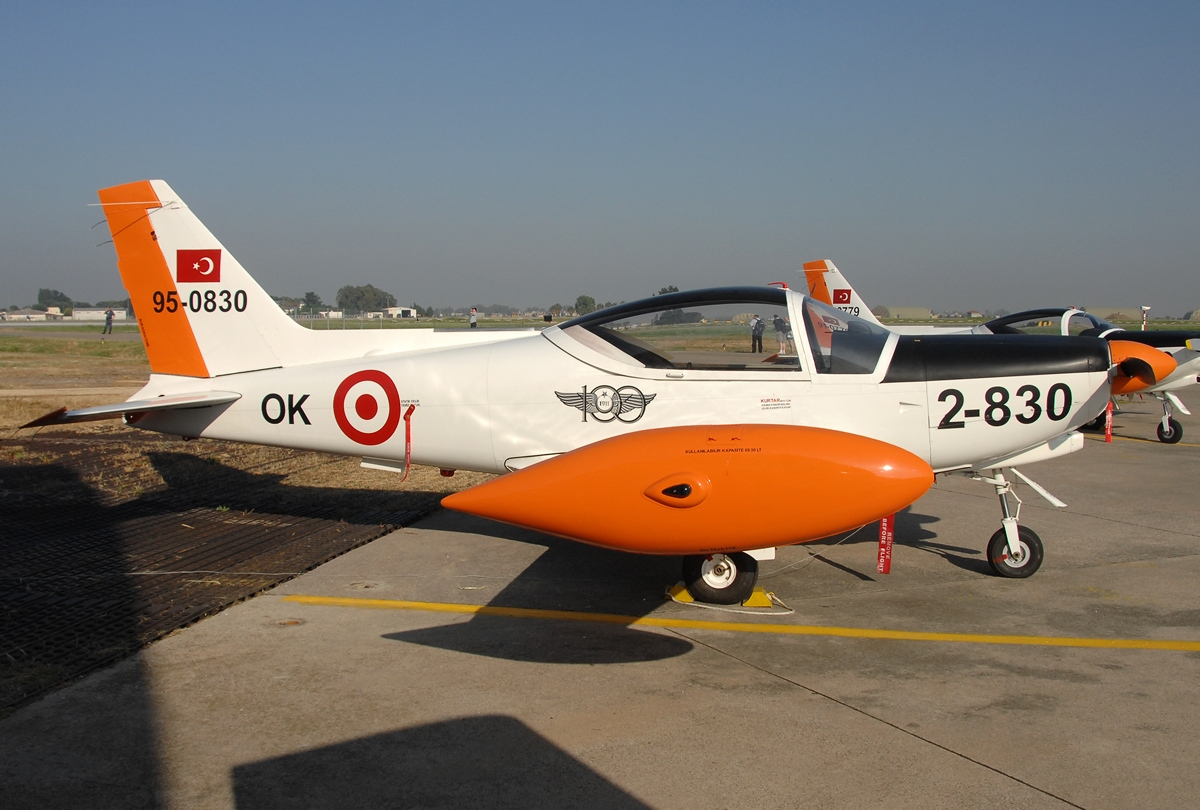
SF260D of Turkish Air Force at Izmir Air Base.

In 1990, the Turkish Air Force placed an order for 40 planes. The first six were produced in Italy and the remaining 34 were produced by Turkish Aerospace Industries in Turkey, under licence. All of the planes are used in training and are deployed at the 123rd Basic Training Squadron stationed at İzmir.

=== Zimbabwe ===
It was announced at the 1997 Paris Salon that the Air Force of Zimbabwe had ordered six F.260F aircraft, thus becoming the first operator of this new model. All six should have been delivered in 1998.

== Variants ==
=== Aviamilano ===
- F.250 – first prototype powered by 187 kW (250 hp) Lycoming O-540-AID. The prototype, regn. I-ZUAR, was destroyed in a crash at Sestri Ponente, Genoa on 7 November 1965.
- F.260 – two prototypes powered by 194 kW (260 hp) Lycoming O-540-E4A5

=== SIAI Marchetti ===
- SF.260 – Production version of the F.260
- SF.260A – Initial production version. Built in small numbers.
- SF.260M – Militarised version with strengthened airframe and improved aerodynamics. First flown 1970.
  - SF.260AM – Italian Air Force version, 33 built.
  - SF.260MB - Version of SF.260M for Belgium.
  - SF.260MC - Version of SF.260M for Zaire.
  - SF.260MP - Version of SF.260M for Philippines.
  - SF.260MS - Version of SF.260M for Singapore.
  - SF.260MT - Version of SF.260M for Thailand. Locally designated B.F.15 (Thai: บ.ฝ.๑๕).
  - SF.260MZ - Version of SF.260M for Zambia.
- SF.260ML – Export version for Libya, 240 built.
- SF.260W Warrior – Armed military version based on SF.260M, with two or four weapons hardpoints. First flown 1972.
- SF.260SW Sea Warrior – Coast patrol, fishery protection aircraft. One built.
- SF.260B – Civilian version incorporating improvements of the SF.260M. Introduced 1974
- SF.260C – Improved version of the SF.260B; introduced in 1977.
- SF.260TP – Allison 250-B17D turboprop version of the SF.260C; first flown in 1980.
- SF.260D – Improved civil version with airframe and aerodynamic improvements similar to SF.260M. Replaced SF.260C. Introduced in 1985.
- SF.260E – Uprated SF.260D to compete for a USAF contract but later marketed to other military buyers
- SF.260F – As above, with fuel-injected engine
- SF.260EA – Most recent variant for Italian Air Force, 30 built.

=== Alenia Aermacchi ===
- SF-260 – current production model

== Operators ==
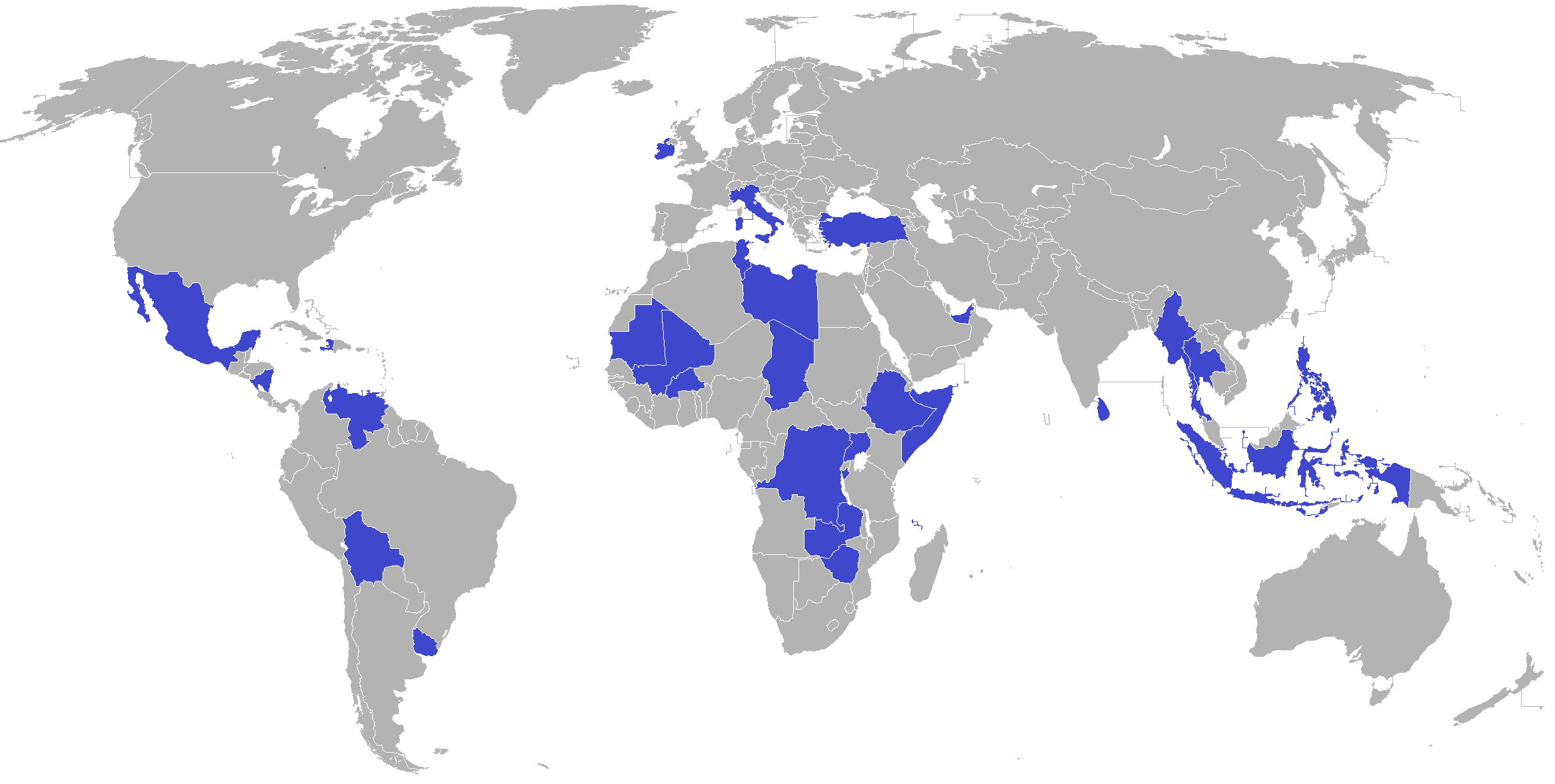
Main operating countries of the Italian SIAI-Marchetti SF.260 aircraft in the world.

=== Military operators ===
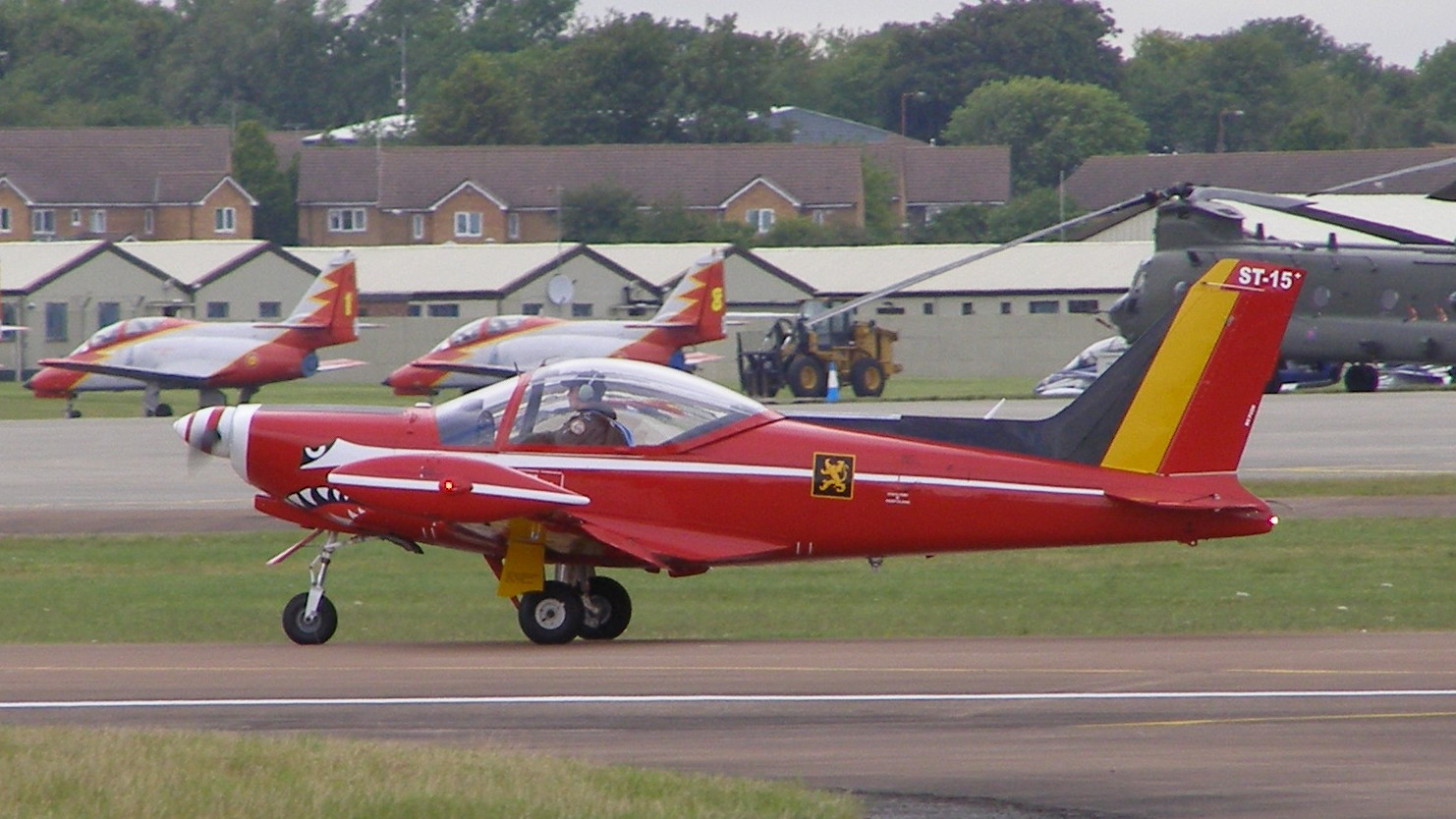
Belgian SF.260 in 2011

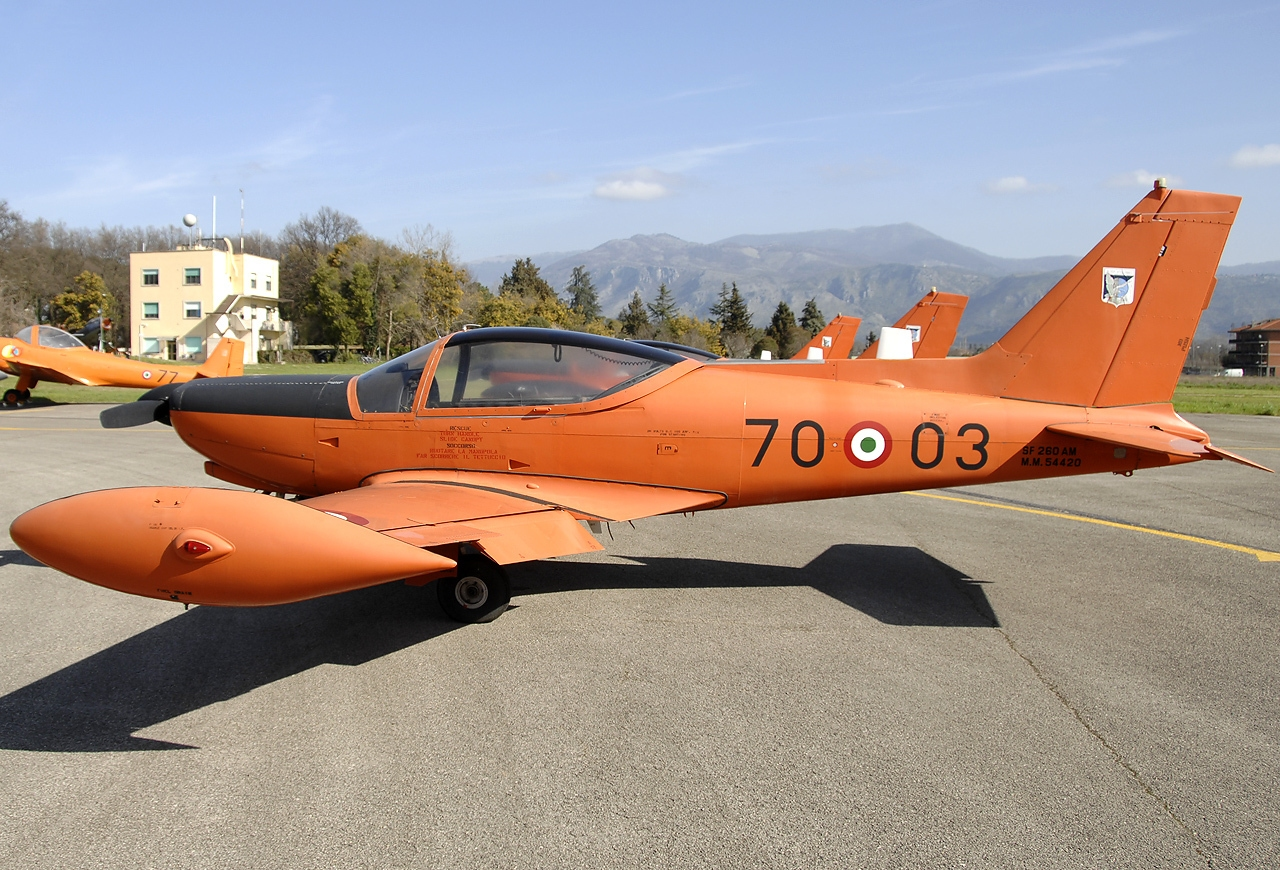
Italian Air Force SIAI-Marchetti SF260M

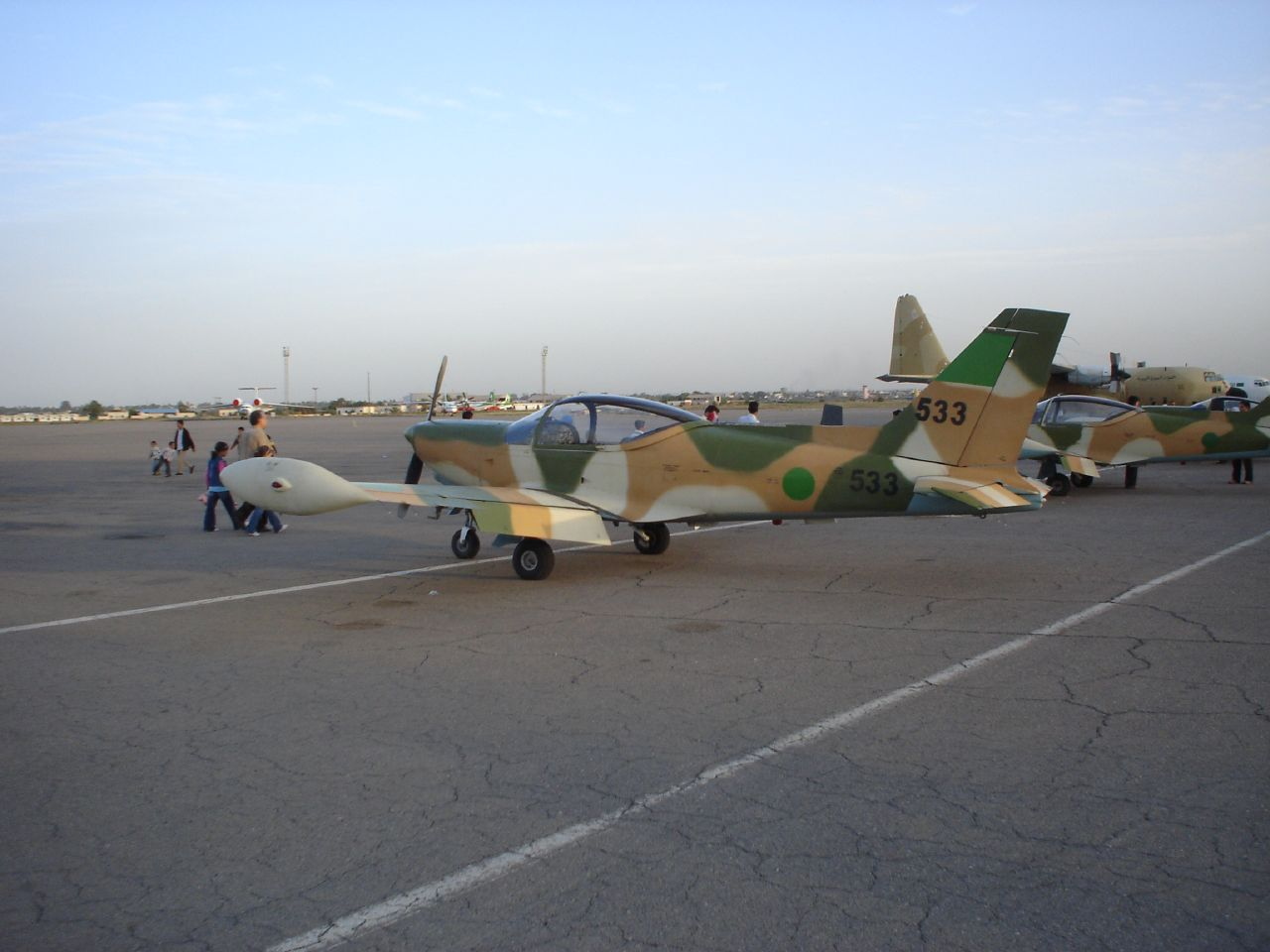
Libyan SF.260 in 2007

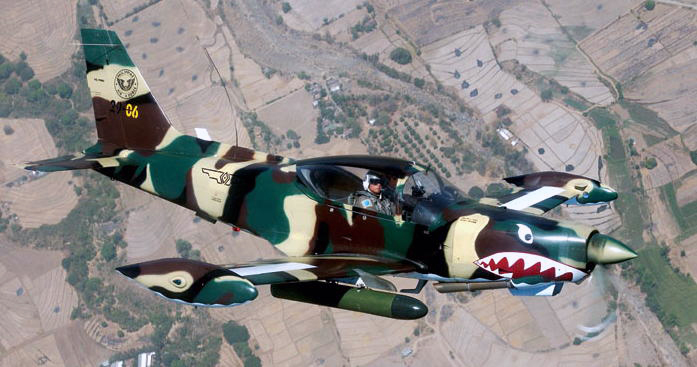
A SF-260 TP light attack aircraft used by the Philippine Air Force

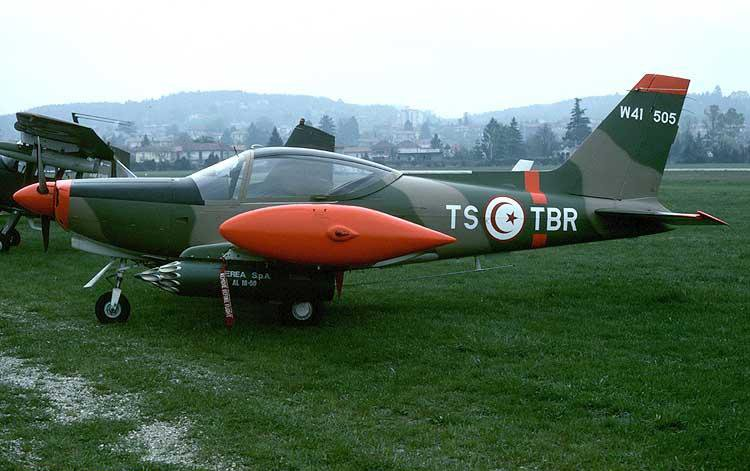
Tunisian Air Force SF.260

Belgium

- Belgian Air Force

Burkina Faso

- Burkina Faso Armed Forces

Burundi

- Burundi Air Force

Chad

- Chad Air Force, nine SF-260WL as of 2012. Two were donated by Libya in 2006.

Democratic Republic of the Congo (from 1971 to 1997 Zaire)

- Congo Air Force, previously Zaire Air Force

Ethiopia

- Ethiopian Air Force

Italy

- Italian Air Force

Libya

- Libyan Air Force

Mali

- Malian Air Force

Mauritania

- Mauritanian Air Force

Mexico

- Mexican Air Force, 25 SF-260E (2019)

Philippines

- Philippine Air Force

Tunisia

- Tunisian Air Force

Turkey

- Turkish Air Force

Uruguay

- Uruguayan Air Force

Venezuela

- Venezuela Air Force

Zambia

- Zambian Air Force

Zimbabwe

- Air Force of Zimbabwe

=== Former military operators ===
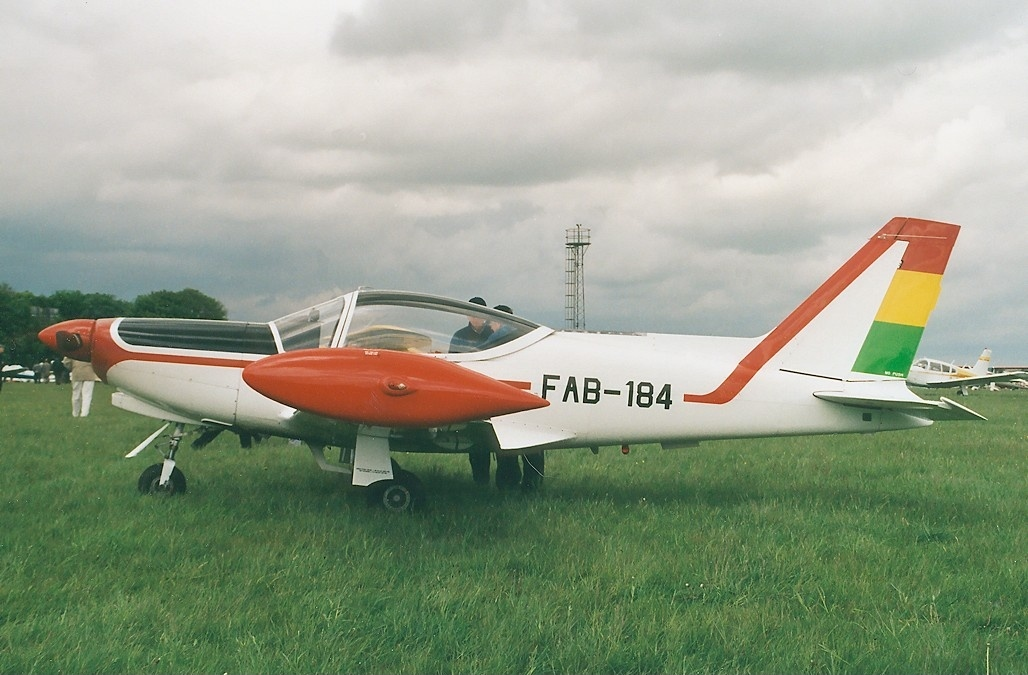
Bolivian Air Force SF-260

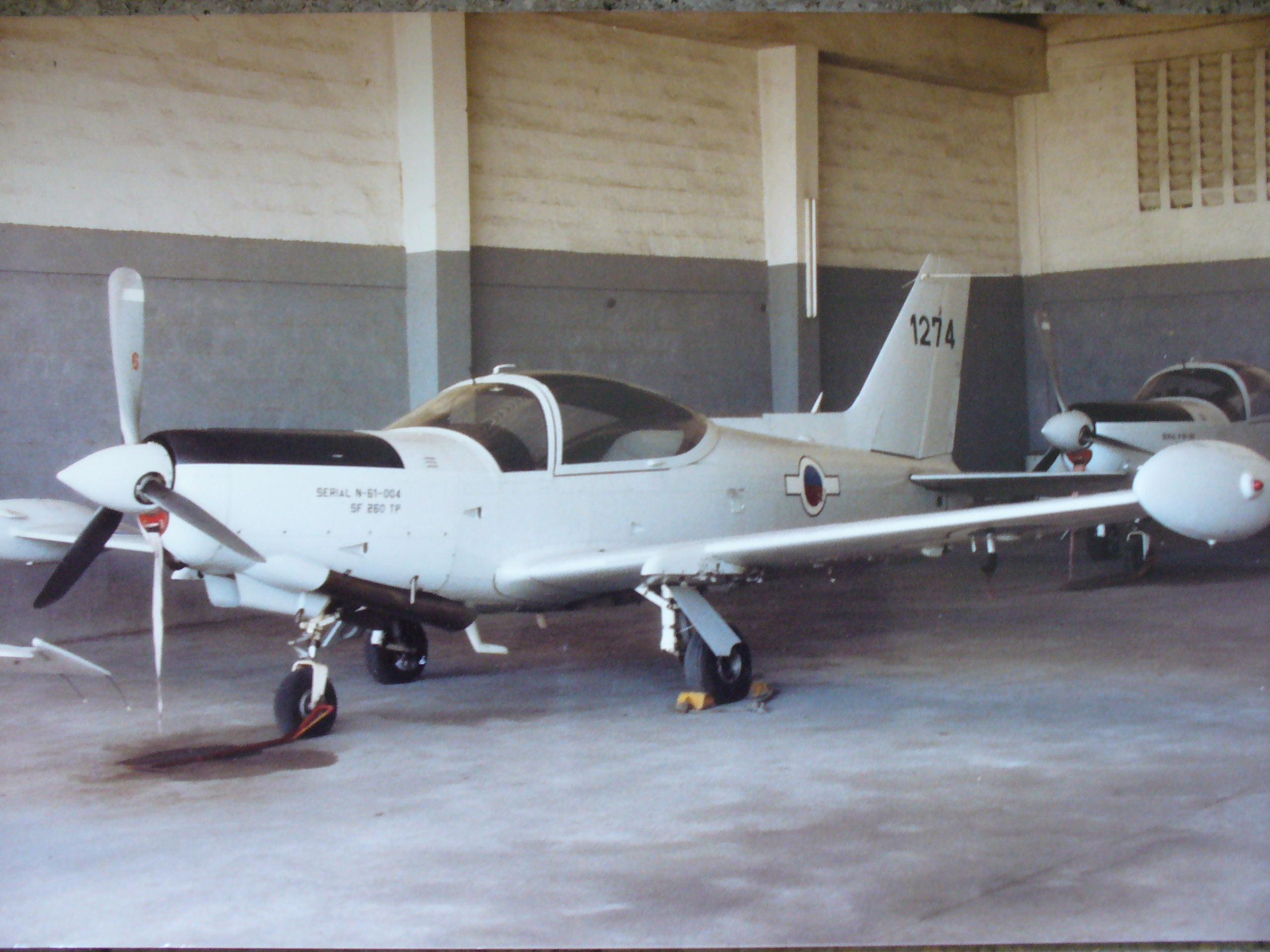
Haitian Corps d'Aviation SF-260TP

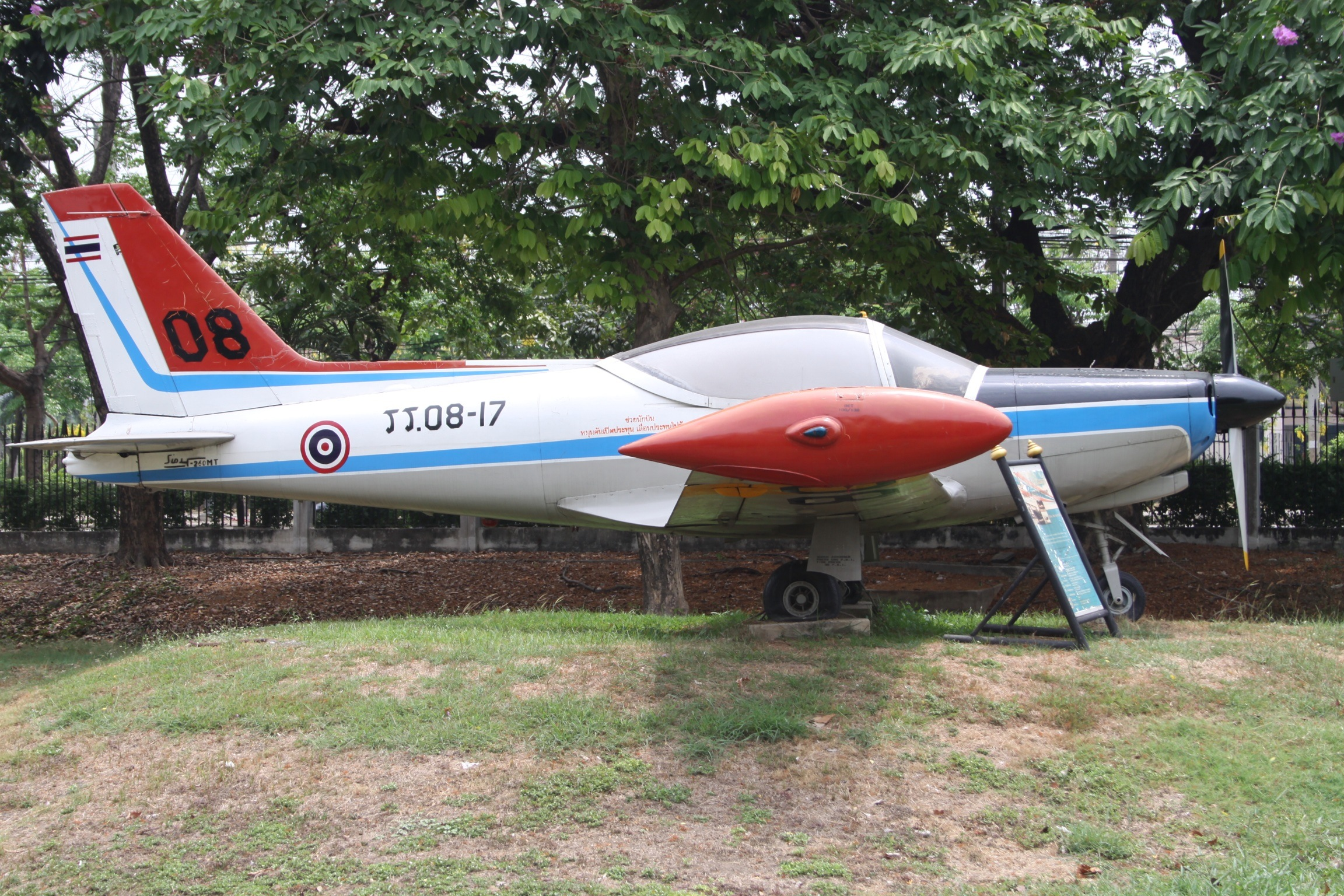
Royal Thai Air Force SF-260MT at Don Mueang International Airport

Bolivia

- Bolivian Air Force, 6 SF-260W (1978–1987)

Brunei

- Royal Brunei Air Force, 2 SF-260W (1982–1998)

Comoros

- Comoros Police Force Aviation, 17 SF-260C and 14 SF-260W (1977), actually re-routed to Rhodesia, plus 3 SF-260 (1978) probably never delivered.

Haiti

- Haitian Air Force, 6 SF-260TP (1992)

Indonesia

- Indonesian Air Force, 18 SF.260M/W

Ireland

- Irish Air Corps, 10 SF-260W (1977-2003)

Myanmar

- Myanmar Air Force, 10SF260M and 11 SF-260W (1975–1990), part re-sold to Sri Lanka.

Nicaragua

- Fuerza Aérea Sandinista, 4 to 6 SF260Wl (ex Libya)

Rhodesia

- Rhodesian Air Force, 17 SF-260C and 14 SF-260W (1977)

Singapore

- Republic of Singapore Air Force – 14 SF.260Ms (1971) and 12 SF.260Ws (1979 and 1981). Part re-sold to Indonesia.

Somalia

- Somali Aeronautical Corps, 12 SF-260C (1979)

Sri Lanka

- Sri Lanka Air Force, 11 SF-260TP (1985–2001) and 12 SF-260W (1991–1998, ex Myanmar)

Thailand

- Royal Thai Air Force, 18 SF-260M (1973–1999)

Uganda

- Ugandan Air Force

United Arab Emirates (Abu Dhabi)

- United Arab Emirates Air Force, 1 SF-260W (1975–1983) and 6 SF-260TP (1983)

=== Civil operators ===
Out of about 860 SF-260s produced, around 180 have been sold to civil users. Most of these are in private hands, although at least four airlines, Alitalia, Sabena, Royal Air Maroc and British Midland Airways purchased the aircraft as a trainer for airliner pilots. Air Combat USA operates 9 SF-260s.

== Specifications (SF-260M) ==
Data from Jane's All the World's Aircraft 1988–89

General characteristics

- Crew: 2
- Capacity: 1 passenger
- Length: 7.10 m (23 ft 4 in)
- Wingspan: 8.35 m (27 ft 5 in) over tip-tanks
- Height: 2.41 m (7 ft 11 in)
- Wing area: 10.10 m^{2} (108.7 sq ft)
- Aspect ratio: 6.3:1 excluding tip-tanks
- Airfoil: root: NACA 641_{1}-212 (modified); tip: NACA 641_{1}-210 (modified)
- Empty weight: 755 kg (1,664 lb)
- Gross weight: 1,140 kg (2,513 lb)
- Max takeoff weight: 1,200 kg (2,646 lb)
- Fuel capacity: internal: 235 L (62 US gal; 52 imp gal) usable
- Powerplant: 1 × Textron Lycoming O-540-E4A5 / Textron Lycoming AEIO-540-D4A5 6-cylinder air-cooled horizontally-opposed piston engine, 190 kW (260 hp)
- Propellers: 2-bladed Hartzell HC-C2YK-1BF/8477-8R constant-speed propeller, 1.93 m (6 ft 4 in) diameter

Performance

- Maximum speed: 333 km/h (207 mph, 180 kn) at sea level
- Cruise speed: 300 km/h (190 mph, 160 kn) at 75% power at 1,500 m (4,900 ft)
- Stall speed: 126 km/h (78 mph, 68 kn) flaps and landing gear down
- Never exceed speed: 436 km/h (271 mph, 235 kn)
- Range: 1,650 km (1,030 mi, 890 nmi) 2 crew, with maximum fuel
- Service ceiling: 4,700 m (15,300 ft)
- g limits: +6 -3 at max aerobatic T-O weight
- Rate of climb: 7.6 m/s (1,500 ft/min)
- Time to altitude:

1,500 m (4,900 ft) in 4 minutes
2,300 m (7,500 ft) in 6 minutes 50 seconds
3,000 m (9,800 ft) in 10 minutes

- Take-off run: 384 m (1,260 ft)
- Landing run: 345 m (1,132 ft)
- Take-off run to 15 m (50 ft): 606 m (1,988 ft)
- Landing run from 15 m (50 ft): 606 m (1,988 ft)

== See also ==
External videos
- Footage of SF260 Aerobatic Team Breitling Devils during training at Thiene Airport, Italy
- Mock combat involving an SF260 in a Hollywood movie
- In-cockpit view of a SF260 inflight

Aircraft of comparable role, configuration, and era

- ENAER T-35 Pillán
- PAC CT/4 Airtrainer
- PZL-130 Orlik
- Saab Safari
- Scottish Aviation Bulldog
