= General Avia =

Coordinates: 41.939224°N 2.5250661°E

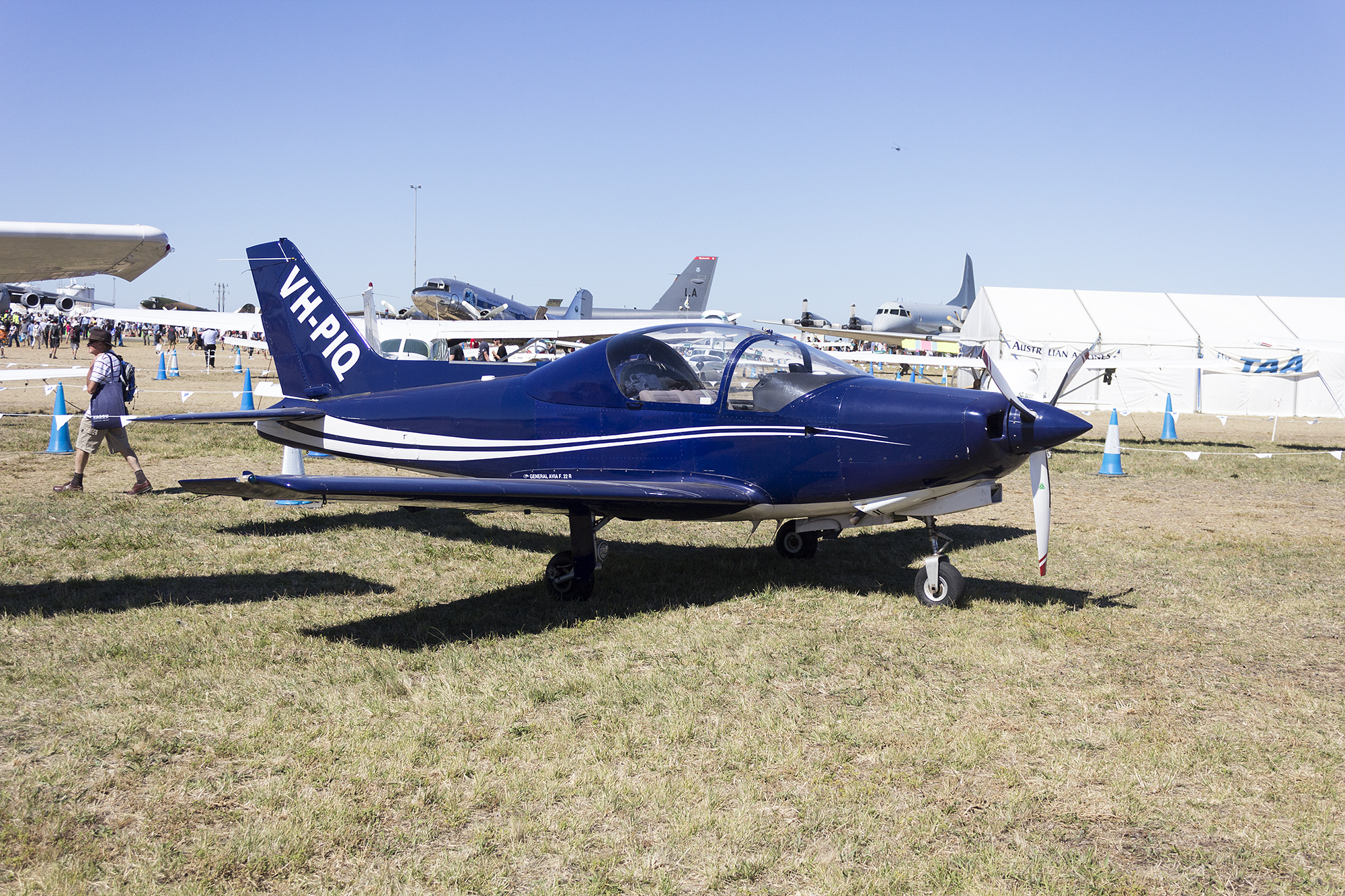
Avia F-22R (VH-PIQ) at the 2013 Australian International Airshow

General Avia is an Italian aircraft manufacturing company which produced prototypes and production models of Stelio Frati's designs.

Today the official name is "General Avia Aerospace Technology Company"

== Aircraft ==
- Procaer Picchio
- Vulcanair Canguro
- General Avia Jet Condor
- General Avia F.22

== See also ==
- List of Italian companies
