= Procaer Cobra =

Two-seat turbojet powered light aircraft

Cobra

General information
- Type: Light jet aircraft
- National origin: Italy
- Manufacturer: Procaer (Progetti costrutzioni aeronautiche)
- Designer: Stelio Frati
- Number built: 1

History
- First flight: 16 November 1960

The Procaer Cobra was a two-seat turbojet powered light aircraft designed and built in Italy and flown in the early 1960s. Only one was completed.

== Design and development ==
The Cobra was a cantilever low wing monoplane with a wooden structure covered in plywood, which had an outer thin aluminium skin bonded to it. The single spar wings had a maximum thickness to chord ratio of 16.5%; in plan they were unswept and straight tapered. There was 6° of dihedral. The ailerons were fitted with electrically operated trim tabs and the inboard flaps were hydraulically powered.

The small Turbomeca Marboré turbojet engine was mounted in the central lower fuselage, fed from wing root inlets and exhausting under the raised rear fuselage just aft of the wing trailing edge. Fuel was supplied from one fuselage and two wing tanks. The horizontal tail was unswept and straight tapered, with squared tips, the starboard elevator carrying an electrically operated trim tab. The fin and rudder were also straight tapered but swept, with a long, low dorsal strake. The cockpit, positioned forward of the wing, seated two side by side. It had a one piece windscreen and a single piece, rear hinged canopy. The Cobra had a retractable tricycle undercarriage, the wing mounted main members swinging inwards close to the air inlet ducts.

The Cobra first flew on 16 November 1960. The construction of a second prototype, the four seat Cobra 480, was begun but not finished.

== Operational history ==
The sole flying Cobra was lost in an accident in August 1965. The unfinished Cobra 480 still exists and building continues in 2010.

== Variants ==
Cobra 400
First prototype, two seater.
Cobra 480
Second prototype, four seater, only partly built.

== Specifications (Cobra 400) ==
Data from Jane's All the World's Aircraft 1962-63.

General characteristics

- Capacity: 2
- Length: 8.10 m (26 ft 7 in)
- Wingspan: 8.70 m (28 ft 7 in)
- Height: 2.80 m (9 ft 2 in)
- Wing area: 11.7 m^{2} (126 sq ft)
- Aspect ratio: 6.5
- Airfoil: NACA 643218
- Empty weight: 1,100 kg (2,425 lb) equipped
- Gross weight: 1,700 kg (3,748 lb)
- Fuel capacity: 515 L (113 Imp gal; 136 US gal)
- Powerplant: 1 × Turbomeca Marboré II turbojet, 3.9 kN (880 lbf) thrust

Performance

- Maximum speed: 580 km/h (360 mph, 310 kn) at 4,000 m (13,100 ft)
- Cruise speed: 480 km/h (300 mph, 260 kn) maximum, at 4,000 m (13,100 ft)
- Stall speed: 125 km/h (78 mph, 67 kn)
- Endurance: 110 min at economical cruising speed of 380 km/h; 205 kn (236 mph) at 4,000 m (13,100 ft)
- Service ceiling: 9,500 m (31,200 ft)
- Rate of climb: 12 m/s (2,400 ft/min) at sea level
- Wing loading: 145 kg/m^{2} (30 lb/sq ft)
- Thrust/weight: 0.24
- Take-off run:700 m (2,300 ft)
