= Italair Pegaso =

F.20 Pegaso, F.20TP Condor
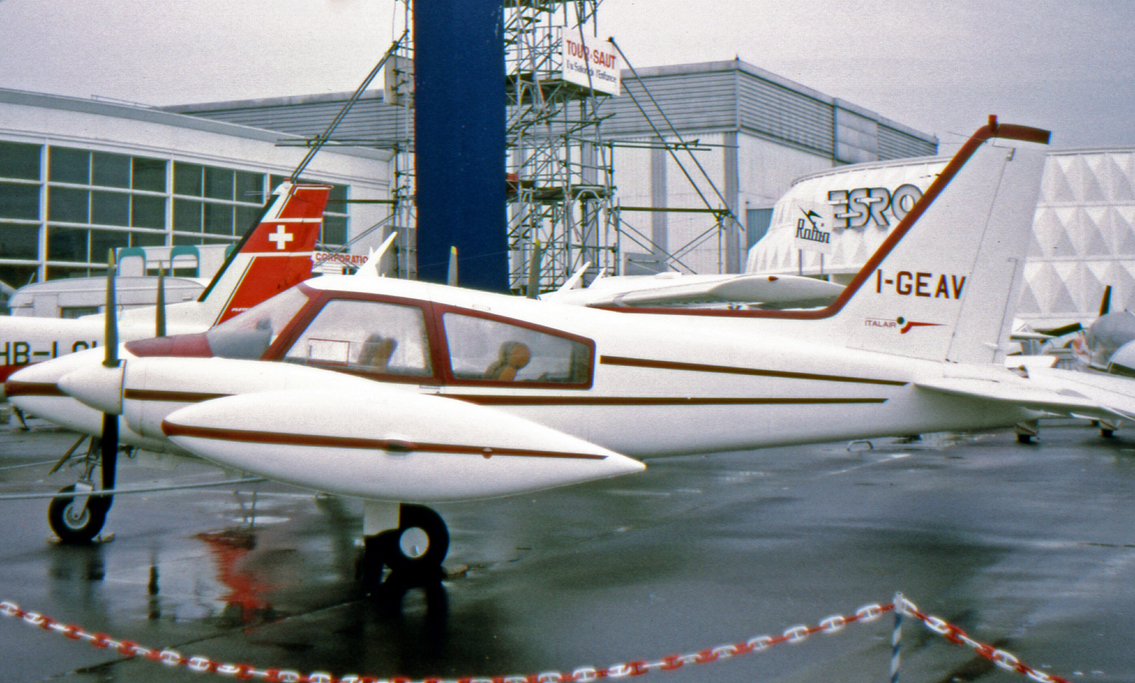
- The prototype Pegaso exhibited at the 1973 Paris Air Show

General information
- Type: Business aircraft
- National origin: Italy
- Manufacturer: Italair, General Avia
- Designer: Stelio Frati
- Number built: 3

History
- First flight: 21 October 1971

The Italair F.20 Pegaso was a twin-engine utility aircraft designed by Stelio Frati and built in Italy in 1971.

== Design and development ==
It had the sleek lines typical of Frati's designs and was a conventional low-wing cantilever monoplane with retractable tricycle undercarriage. Construction throughout was of metal, and the aircraft was notable at the time for its high speed, much greater than that of its competitors. The prototype Pegaso was exhibited at the 1973 Paris Air Show. Before arrangements could be made to produce the aircraft in series, however, Italair ran out of money, and the rights to the design reverted to Frati.

In the early 1980s, Frati designed a modernised version of the aircraft, powered by Allison 250 turboprop engines in place of the Pegaso's piston engines and equipped with a large sliding bubble canopy. Built by Frati's own company, General Avia, and named the F.20TP Condor, this version first flew on 7 May 1983. Frati hoped that this version might attract military buyers who could use it for training, maritime patrol, or even ground attack, and the prototype was equipped with two pylons under each wing to demonstrate its capacity to carry external stores. Although exhibited at the Paris Air Show in 1985, development of the Condor was postponed in favour of the Promavia Jet Squalus that Frati was working on at the time, and was eventually abandoned.

== Specifications (F.20 Pegaso) ==
Data from Jane's all the world's aircraft, 1975-76

General characteristics

- Crew: 1
- Capacity: 5 pax
- Length: 8.2 m (26 ft 11 in)
- Wingspan: 10.34 m (33 ft 11 in)
- Height: 3.5 m (11 ft 6 in)
- Wing area: 16.02 m^{2} (172.4 sq ft)
- Aspect ratio: 6.67
- Airfoil: NACA 65_{2}-415
- Empty weight: 1,510 kg (3,329 lb)
- Max takeoff weight: 2,170 kg (4,784 lb)
- Fuel capacity: 2x 124 L (33 US gal; 27 imp gal) wing tanks plus 2x 126 L (33 US gal; 28 imp gal) wing-tip tanks
- Powerplant: 2 × Continental IO-520-F 6-cyl. fuel injected air-cooled horizontally-opposed piston engine, 220 kW (300 hp) each
- Propellers: 2-bladed Hartzell HC-C2YF-2CDF/C-8475-6 fully feathering constant-speed propellers, 1.98 m (6 ft 6 in) diameter

Performance

- Maximum speed: 400 km/h (250 mph, 220 kn)
- Cruise speed: 390 km/h (240 mph, 210 kn) at 3,660 m (12,010 ft)
- Stall speed: 121 km/h (75 mph, 65 kn) flaps down
- Never exceed speed: 431 km/h (268 mph, 233 kn)
- Range: 1,013 km (629 mi, 547 nmi) with max payload
- Ferry range: 2,060 km (1,280 mi, 1,110 nmi) with max fuel
- Service ceiling: 6,250 m (20,510 ft)
- Rate of climb: 10 m/s (2,000 ft/min) at sea level
- Wing loading: 143.5 kg/m^{2} (29.4 lb/sq ft)
- Power/mass: 0.195 kW/kg (0.118 hp/lb)
