= Pasotti F.9 Sparviero =

F.9 Sparviero
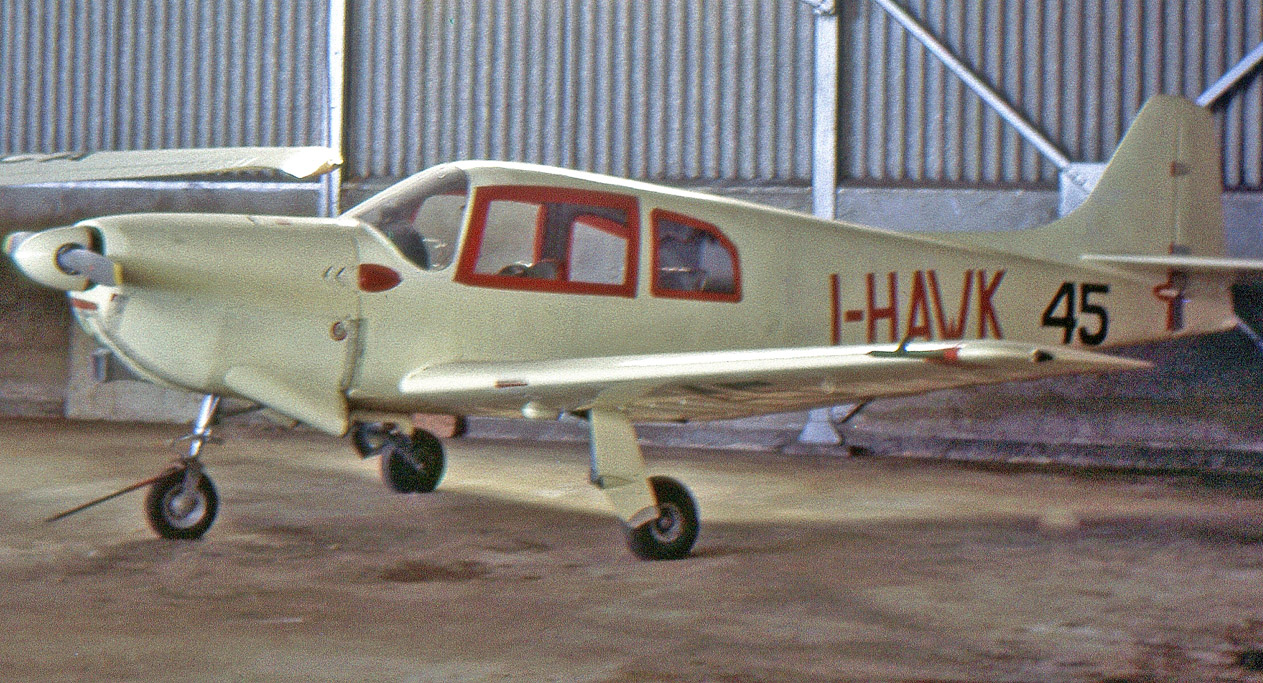
- The sole Sparviero at Milan Linate Airport in July 1965

General information
- Type: Four seat touring aircraft
- National origin: Italy
- Manufacturer: Legname Pasotti SpA, Brescia
- Designer: Stelio Frati
- Number built: 1

History
- First flight: 27 July 1956

The Pasotti F.9 Sparviero (English: Sparrowhawk) was a four-seat, low-wing touring aircraft, built in Italy in the 1950s. Designed by Stelio Frati, it was a single-engine version of his earlier twin-engined Airone. Only one was built.

== Design and development ==
The F.9 Sparviero was a single-engined version of the earlier, twin-engined F.6 Airone, both Stelio Frati designs. The two aircraft shared many constructional details and had almost the same dimensions and weights, though the Sparviero's nose-mounted engine extended the fuselage. Engine layout apart, the two were very similar in appearance; they also both failed to reach production and only one Airone and one Sparviero were built.

The Sparviero had an all-wood, low mounted cantilever wing of isosceles trapezoidal plan, built around a single spar and covered with stressed plywood skin, with differential ailerons and trailing edge flaps. The fuselage was a ply skinned wooden monocoque, built in two sections which bolted together just aft of the wings. The forward part held the cabin, which seated four in two pairs, with access via two wide doors over the wings. The roof line of the cabin continued aft into that of the rear fuselage. The Sparviero was initially powered by a 250 hp (187 kW) Hirth inverted V-8 air-cooled engine, though it was the intention to replace this with a 260 hp (194 kW) Lycoming horizontally opposed engine in production models and the prototype received one later. Fuel was fed from three tanks, two in the wings and one in the fuselage. The tail unit was conventional, with the tailplane just above the fuselage. The latter tapered in height rearwards, and the fin merged into it with a dorsal fillet. The empennage construction was similar to that of the wing, except that the control surfaces were fabric-covered. The tricycle undercarriage was retractable and fitted with hydraulic brakes.

The Sparviero first flew on 27 July 1956, piloted by Vico Rocaspina who was responsible for all the early flight programme.

== Operational history ==
The only Sparviero built, I-HAWK, was in private hands by April 1958, based at Milano Linate and was still there in July 1964. It was withdrawn from use in 1968 and presented to the Milan Science Museum in 1972.

== Specifications (Hirth engine) ==
Data from Jane's All the World's Aircraft 1957-58

General characteristics

- Capacity: 4
- Length: 8.3 m (27 ft 3 in)
- Wingspan: 10.0 m (32 ft 10 in)
- Wing area: 14.70 m^{2} (158.2 sq ft)
- Aspect ratio: 6.8
- Empty weight: 990 kg (2,183 lb)
- Gross weight: 1,520 kg (3,351 lb)
- Fuel capacity: 240 L (53 Imp gal, 63 US gal)
- Powerplant: 1 × Hirth Inverted V-8, air-cooled, 190 kW (250 hp)
- Propellers: 2-bladed electrically controllable pitch

Performance

- Maximum speed: 320 km/h (200 mph, 170 kn)
- Cruise speed: 264 km/h (164 mph, 143 kn) normal
- Stall speed: 85 km/h (53 mph, 46 kn)
- Range: 1,310 km (810 mi, 710 nmi)
- Service ceiling: 5,030 m (16,500 ft)
- Take-off distance: 250 m (820 ft)
- Landing distance: 200 m (656 ft)
