= Partenavia Jolly =

P.59 Jolly

General information
- Type: Training monoplane
- National origin: Italy
- Manufacturer: Partenavia
- Number built: 1

History
- First flight: 1960

The Partenavia P.59 Jolly was an Italian two-seat training monoplane designed by Partenavia to meet a requirement for the Aero Club d'Italia. First fight was in 1960.

== Development ==
The P.59 Jolly was designed to meet a requirement for a standard trainer for the Italian national flying clubs. The prototype first flew on 2 February 1960 and was a high-wing monoplane with a nose-mounted 95 hp (71 kW) Continental engine. It had a fixed tailwheel landing gear and seated two occupants side-by-side in an enclosed cockpit. The aircraft was later re-engined with a 100 hp (75 kW) Continental O-200 engine and the wing span was increased. The competition was won by the Aviamilano P.19 Scricciolo and only one Jolly was built.

== Specifications ==
Data from Jane's All The World's Aircraft 1961–62

General characteristics

- Crew: 2
- Length: 6.56 m (21 ft 6 in)
- Wingspan: 10.21 m (33 ft 6 in)
- Height: 2.125 m (7 ft 0 in)
- Wing area: 15.17 m^{2} (163.3 sq ft)
- Aspect ratio: 6.9:1
- Airfoil: NACA 4412
- Empty weight: 507 kg (1,118 lb)
- Gross weight: 737 kg (1,625 lb)
- Fuel capacity: 100 L (26 US gal; 22 imp gal)
- Powerplant: 1 × Continental O-200 air-cooled flat-four engine, 75 kW (100 hp)
- Propellers: 2-bladed Sensenich M76 AK48 fixed-pitch propeller

Performance

- Maximum speed: 197 km/h (122 mph, 106 kn)
- Cruise speed: 168 km/h (104 mph, 91 kn) (econ. cruise)
- Stall speed: 60 km/h (37 mph, 32 kn)
- Range: 800 km (500 mi, 430 nmi)
- Service ceiling: 3,500 m (11,500 ft)
- Rate of climb: 3.33 m/s (655 ft/min)

== See also ==
- Aviamilano Scricciolo
