= Aviamilano CPV1 =

General information
- Type: Competition sailplane
- National origin: Italy
- Manufacturer: Aviamilano Construzioni Aeronautitche
- Designer: Amletto Zaneti and Mario Vietri
- Number built: 1

History
- First flight: 1963

The Aviomilano CPV1, also known as the Arlecchino (English: Harlequin), was an Italian high performance sailplane built in the early 1960s. Only one was built.

== Design and development ==
The joint designers and builders of the CPV1 were a glider pilot, Amletto Zaneti and the owner of Aviamilano, Mario Vietri. The design emphasised high performance in both weak and strong thermals. It was built at the Polytechnic University of Milan's Centre for Flight (Italian: Centro Politecnico del Volo (CPV)), hence its name.

Structurally the CPV1 was a wooden aircraft, covered in a mixture of plywood and fabric. It had a long span, high aspect ratio, cantilever wing, which was straight tapered and had squared tipss. It was built around a single main spar, with ply covering forward of it to and around the leading edge forming a torsion resistant D-box. Aft of the spar the wing was fabric covered. Inboard of long ailerons, which occupied about half the span, there were Fowler flaps and also mid chord spoilers. The wing carried some dihedral and was attached to the fuselage at the shoulder wing position.

The CPV1 had an ovoid cross-section, plywood-skinned fuselage. A long, single-seat cockpit with a two-piece canopy following the fuselage contours was placed ahead of the leading edge. Under it a landing skid reached aft to a retractable single wheel, fitted with a brake, under the forward wing. The fuselage tapered rearwards to a straight, tapered tail with fabric-covered control surfaces. The fin and rudder were tall, the rudder reaching down to the keel. The tailplane and elevators were at the top of the fuselage, far enough forward not to overlap with the rudder.

The sole CPV1 first flew in 1963.

== Specifications ==
Data from Jane's All the World's Aircraft 1966-67 p.394

General characteristics

- Capacity: One
- Length: 7.0 m (23 ft 0 in)
- Wingspan: 16.60 m (54 ft 6 in)
- Wing area: 14.70 m^{2} (158.2 sq ft)
- Aspect ratio: 18.7
- Empty weight: 305 kg (672 lb)
- Gross weight: 400 kg (882 lb)

Performance

- Stall speed: 68 km/h (42 mph, 37 kn)
- Maximum glide ratio: 35:1 estimated
- Wing loading: 27.20 kg/m^{2} (5.57 lb/sq ft)
