= Stelio Frati =

Italian light aircraft designer

Stelio Frati (born in Milan Italy in 1919, died 14 May 2010) was an Italian mechanical engineer and aeroplane designer. He graduated from the Politecnico di Milano as a mechanical engineer in 1943, participating in the design of the Aeronautica Lombarda AR (Assalto Radioguidato - RC attack) radio-controlled wooden cantilever monoplane, powered by a single radial engine - a flying bomb/drone, flown for the first time the same year. After teaching aircraft design he became a freelance aircraft designer, being responsible for many well known aircraft designs. One of his best known designs is the Falco F8L.

== Designs ==
- F.M.1 Passero motor-glider (1947) - One built by Ditta Movo
- F.4 Rondone (1951) - One built by CVV, production batch of nine built by Aeronautica Lombardi and Ambrosini.
- F.5 (1952) - One built by Caproni
- F.6 Airone (1954) - One built by Pasotti
- F.7 Rondone (1954) - Built by Pasotti
- F.8 Falco (1955) - Built by Aviamilano, Aeromere, Laverda and an amateur build variant by Sequoia of Virginia
- F.9 Sparviero (1956) - One built by Pasotti
- F.14 Nibbio (1958) - Built by Aviamilano
- F.15 Picchio (1959) - Built by Procaer and General Avia
- F.20 Pegaso (1971) - Built by General Avia
- F.20TP Condor (1983) - One built by General Avia
- F.22 Pinguino (1989) - One built by General Avia
- F.30 Golden Avio (2012) - Four built by Golden Avio
- F.250 (1964) - Built by Aviamilano
- F.260 (1964) - Built by Aviamilano, licence built by SIAI-Marchetti as the SF.260
- F.400 Cobra (1960) - One built by Procaer
- F.480 (Not completed)
- SF.600 Canguro (1978) One built by General Avia - licence built production by SIAI-Marchetti
- F.1000
- F.1300 Jet Squalus (1987) - Built by Promavaia
- F.2500
- F.3000 (Not built)
- F.3500 Sparviero
