= Pierina Pasotti =

Argentine geologist, geographer and professor (1902–1996)

Pierina Antonieta Ernestina Pasotti (29 June 1902 – 18 June 1996) was an Argentine geologist, geographer and professor who advanced the geological science of the Argentine pampas and the province of Santa Fe. She was the first woman to be named professor emerita at the National University of Rosario.

== Biography ==
Pasotti was born in Rosario, Santa Fe province, in 1902, but moved with her family to Italy as a child. She attended the University of Turin (Italy) and graduated on 27 July 1927 with a PhD in Natural Sciences. She revalidated her degree in Argentina, specializing in Mineralogy and Geology, at the National University of Córdoba on 17 September 1951. Because the university did not welcome women to join its faculty, she became one of the pioneering women to work in research and hold management positions at a time when positions were traditionally reserved for men. After the intervention of a friend, Dr. Benjamín Abalos who was also a government minister, she was allowed to begin her university teaching career on 1 July 1930 as a Trainer in the department of Physiography, Mineralogy and Petrography of the Faculty of Mathematical, Physical-Chemical and Natural Sciences Applied to Industry, Argentina, of the National University of Litoral, and was appointed a Full Professor in 1951, in today's Faculty of Exact Sciences, Engineering and Surveying of the current National University of Rosario. She held on to that position until September 1955 when she was laid off during the country's pro-fascist dictatorship of Eduardo Lonardi. She managed to recover her chair in 1960 when a new government came to power. She was named professor emeritus of that university in 1969, and was the first woman to receive that distinction.

She was a teacher in Geography at the Faculty of Philosophy and Letters (today, Humanities and Arts), at the secondary level at the Escuela Industrial de la Nación (today the Instituto Politécnico Superior) and at the Dante Alighieri Institute, in Rosario between the years 1936 and 1955.

In 1929 she began her extensive scientific research activity in geosciences and in 1936, she joined the Institute of Physiography and Geology of the Faculty of Exact Sciences, Engineering and Surveying. She was appointed its director in 1952, a position she held until her death.

She died at 93 in Rosario on 18 June 1996.

== Selected publications ==
She attended 60 National Congresses and presented papers in 52 of them. Her most cited papers are:

- Pasotti, Pierina. Vinculaciones de la tectonica con el reccorrido de las redes hidrograficas en la Llanura argentina y en especial en la Bonaerense. Instituto de geografia, (Links between tectonics and the course of hydrographic networks in the Argentine Plain and especially in the Buenos Aires Plain. Institute of Geography) (1958).
- Pasotti, Pierina. "La Neotectónica en llanura pampeana: fundamentos para el mapa neotectónico." (Neotectonics in the Pampas plain: foundations for the neotectonic map) (1974).
- Pasotti, Pierina, Oscar A. Albert, and Carlos A. Canoba. "Contribución al conocimiento de la laguna Melincué." (Contribution to the knowledge of the Melincué lagoon) (1984).
- Pasotti, Pierina, and Oscar A. Albert. "El río Carcarañá en territorio santafesino." (The Carcarañá River in Santa Fe territory) (1991).
