= Pasotti F.6 Airone =

Airone

General information
- Type: Light aircraft
- National origin: Italy
- Manufacturer: Legname Pasotti SpA, Brescia
- Designer: Stelio Frati
- Number built: 1

The Pasotti F.6 Airone was a low-wing, twin-engined, wooden, four seat civil aircraft built in Italy in the 1950s. Production was considered but only one was completed.

== Design and development ==
The F in the designation of the Pasotti built F.6 Airone stood for its designer, Stelio Frati, who was responsible for several fast light wooden aircraft powered by either piston or turbine engines. The Airone (Heron in English) was a low-winged, twin piston engine driven, four seater. It was intended as a general light four seater for private or executive use, or as an air ambulance.

The Airone's wings were built around a one piece single wooden spar and clad with stress bearing plywood. They carried differential ailerons and trailing edge flaps. The fuselage structure and that of the conventional tail unit was similar, though the rudder and elevators were fabric covered. The fuselage was built in two sections, bolted together behind the wing trailing edge. The rear section tapered towards the tail, where the tailplane was fitted on its top and the fin blended in with a curved leading edge. The front section included the enclosed cabin with two pairs of seats. Dual controls were fitted. There were wide doors on either side into the cabin; the baggage compartment behind it could be accessed from inside the cabin or by a separate external hatch. The only Airone completed carried its fuel in a tank ahead of the cabin, though production aircraft would have used wingtip tanks instead. (Note: Reference 3 states that the prototype's tanks were in the wings.)

The Airone had a conventional retractable tricycle undercarriage with its trailing idler (knee action) main gear legs mounted below the engines. The prototype was powered by two flat 4-cylinder Continental C90 engines of 90 hp (67 kW) each, driving fixed pitch propellers. Production aircraft would have been powered by two 105 hp (78 kW) Walter Minor IV inverted inline engines with variable pitch airscrews, though there were other possible engine choices in the 90 to 140 hp (67 to 104 kW) range. In February 1958 there was a report that Aeromere would produce the Airone powered with unspecified 150 hp (112 kW) engines in place of the Walters. As with other proposals to produce the Airone, this too came to nothing.

== Specifications (production aircraft) ==
Data from Jane's All the Worlds Aircraft 1956-57

General characteristics

- Capacity: 4
- Length: 7.25 m (23 ft 9 in)
- Wingspan: 10.25 m (33 ft 8 in)
- Wing area: 14.7 m^{2} (158 sq ft) gross
- Empty weight: 850 kg (1,874 lb)
- Gross weight: 1,400 kg (3,086 lb)
- Powerplant: 2 × Walter Minor IV 4-cylinder inverted inline air cooled, 78 kW (105 hp) each
- Propellers: 2-bladed variable pitch and featherable

Performance

- Maximum speed: 300 km/h (190 mph, 160 kn)
- Cruise speed: 260 km/h (160 mph, 140 kn)
- Range: 1,200 km (750 mi, 650 nmi)
- Service ceiling: 5,500 m (18,000 ft)
- Rate of climb: 5.97 m/s (1,176 ft/min)
