= Aviamilano Nibbio =

F.14 Nibbio
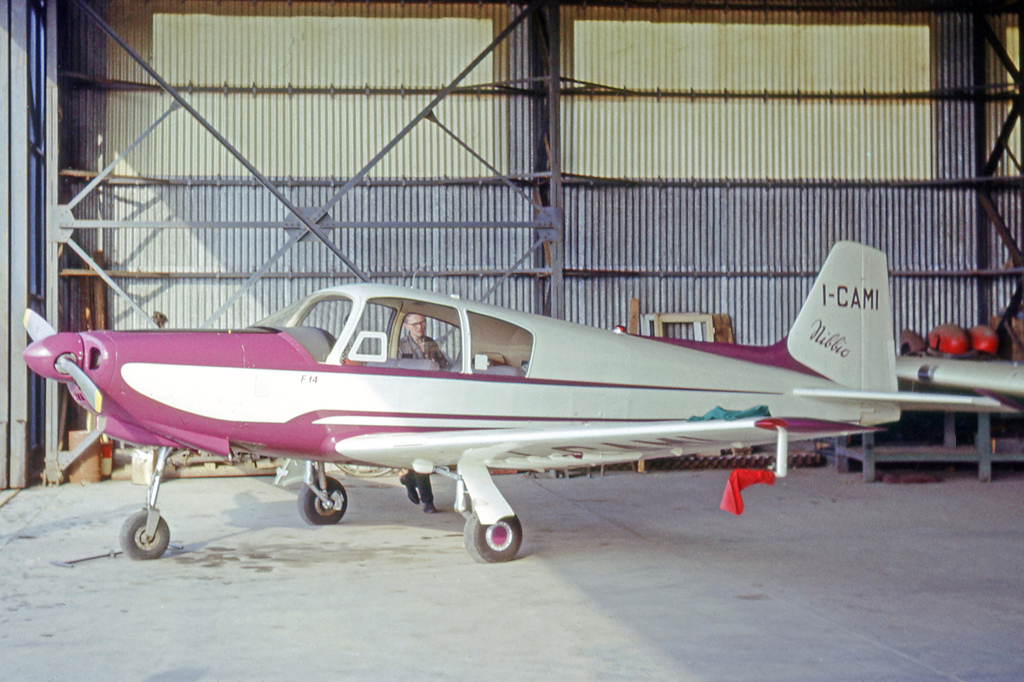
- F.14 Nibbio at Varese Airport Italy in 1965

General information
- Type: Four seat light aircraft
- National origin: Italy
- Manufacturer: Aviamilano
- Designer: Stelio Frati
- Status: some still in service in 2006
- Primary user: private pilot owners
- Number built: 11

History
- First flight: 16 January 1958

The Aviamilano F.14 Nibbio (Kite, as in the bird) is a four-seat, single engine cabin monoplane built in Italy in the late 1950s. Only ten production aircraft were completed.

== Design and development ==
Designed by Stelio Frati, the Nibbio is a conventionally laid out, cantilever low wing monoplane, seating four in two rows. It is a scaled-up version of Frati's successful two seat F.8 Falco. The Nibbio has a wooden structure and is mostly plywood skinned with fabric overall, though the rear control surfaces have only fabric covering. The single spar wing, which is straight tapered and square tipped carries electrically operated split flaps and has 5° of dihedral.

The fuselage is a two-part monocoque structure, bolted together. The rear surfaces are tapered and straight edged; the elevator has a flight adjustable trim tab. Forward, the upper fuselage line merges into that of the cabin glazing over a baggage space behind the rear bench seat. The front seats have dual control. Cabin access is via a starboard side door. The Nibbio is powered by a 180 hp (134 kW) Lycoming O-360 air-cooled four cylinder horizontally opposed engine, fed fuel from one fuselage and two wing tanks. It has an electrically retractable tricycle undercarriage with hydraulic brakes and a steerable nosewheel. The main legs are wing mounted and retract inwards.

The Nibbio flew for the first time on 16 January 1958.

== Operational history ==
After the prototype, Aviamilano built ten production Nibbios.

By 2010 only two Nibbios remained on the European civil aircraft registers, one in Italy and one in the UK.

== Specifications ==
Data from Jane's All the World's Aircraft 1960-61

General characteristics

- Crew: 1
- Capacity: 3 passengers
- Length: 7.25 m (23 ft 9 in)
- Wingspan: 9.50 m (31 ft 2 in)
- Height: 2.48 m (8 ft 2 in)
- Wing area: 12.90 m^{2} (138.9 sq ft)
- Aspect ratio: 7.0
- Airfoil: NACA 64000 series, modified
- Empty weight: 680 kg (1,499 lb)
- Gross weight: 1,150 kg (2,535 lb)
- Fuel capacity: 210 L (55 US gal; 46 imp gal)
- Powerplant: 1 × Lycoming O-360-A1A Air-cooled flat four, 130 kW (180 hp)
- Propellers: 2-bladed Hartzell Propeller TYpe HC-92 ZK-8D metal constant speed

Performance

- Maximum speed: 335 km/h (208 mph, 181 kn) at sea level
- Cruise speed: 270 km/h (170 mph, 150 kn) economic. Maximum cruising speed 310 km/h (210 mph; 167 kn)
- Stall speed: 82 km/h (51 mph, 44 kn) at sea level with 30° flaps
- Range: 1,000 km (620 mi, 540 nmi) with 30 min reserves
- Service ceiling: 5,400 m (17,700 ft)
- Time to altitude: 8 min to 2,000 m (6,500 ft)
- Wing loading: 80.94 kg/m^{2} (16.58 lb/sq ft)
- Take-off distance to 15 m (49 ft): 450 m (1,476 ft)
- Landing distance run: 150 m (492 ft)
