= List of aircraft (Se) =

This is a list of aircraft in alphabetical order beginning with 'Se'.

== Se ==
=== SEA ===
(Société d'Etudes Aéronautiques (Belgium))

- SEA.1

=== SEA ===
(Société d'Etudes Aéronautiques (France))

- SEA I
- SEA II
- SEA III
- SEA IV
- SEA VI

=== Sea and Sky ===
(Sea and Sky Inc, Fort Walton Beach, Florida, United States)

- Sea and Sky Cygnet
- Sea and Sky Explorer 103

=== Sea-Bow International ===
(Valcourt, Quebec, Canada)

- Sea-Bow International Sea-Bow

=== Seair ===
(Seair Technologies)

- Seair Flying Boat

=== Seabird ===
(Seabird Aviation Australia Pty. Ltd. Australia)

- Seabird SB-4 Sentinel
- Seabird SB5 Sentinel
- Seabird SB7 Seeker

=== Seabird ===
(Seabird Aviation Inc, Columbus, Ohio, United States)

- Seabird Le Petrel

=== Seaflight (NZ) ===
(Shearwater Aircraft)

- Shearwater 201

=== Seagrave ===
(Marshal T Seagrave, Piedmont (Oakland), California, United States)

- Seasgrave 1

=== Seahawk ===
(Seahawk Industries)

- Seahawk Condor
- Seahawk Condor II
- Seahawk Condor III

=== Searey ===
(Progressive Aerodyne Inc (fdr: Kerry Richter), Orlando, Florida, United States)

- Progressive Aerodyne SeaRey

=== SeaStar Aircraft ===
- SeaStar Aircraft SeaStar

=== Seawind ===
(Seawind International / SNA Inc.)

- Seawind
- Seawind 2000
- Seawind 3000
- Seawind 300C

=== Seabring ===
(Robert M Sebring, San Fernando, California, United States)

- Sebring 1948 Monoplane

=== SECAN ===
(Société d'Etudes et de Construction Aéro-Navales, France)

- SECAN Courlis

=== SECAT ===
(Société d'Etudes et de Construction d'Avions de Tourisme, France)

- SECAT RG-60
- SECAT RG-75
- SECAT S-4 Mouette
- SECAT S-5
- SECAT VI La Mouette

=== SECM-Amiot ===
(SECM-Amiot - Société d'Emboutissage et de Constructions Mécaniques / Félix Amiot)

- See:- Avions Amiot

=== Security-National ===
(Security Aircraft Corp, Long Beach, California, United States)

- Security-National S-1 Airster
- Security-National S-1-A Airster
- Security-American S-1-B Airster

=== Seedwings Europe ===
(Schlitters, Austria)

- Seedwings Europe Crossover XC
- Seedwings Europe Crossover XCs
- Seedwings Europe Funky
- Seedwings Europe Kestrel
- Seedwings Europe Merlin
- Seedwings Europe Skyrunner XR
- Seedwings Europe Skyrunner XRs
- Seedwings Europe Space
- Seedwings Europe Vertigo

=== SEEMS ===
(Société d'Exploitation des Etablissements Morane Saulnier, France) see: Morane-Saulnier, SOCATA

=== Seguin ===
(Elliot Seguin)

- Seguin Wasabi Special

=== Seibel ===
(Seibel Helicopter Co Inc, Wilson Field, Wichita, United States)

- Seibel S-1
- Seibel S-2
- Seibel S-3 Skylark
- Seibel S-4 Skyhawk
- Seibel H-24 Sky Hawk

=== Selcher ===
(John Selcher)

- Selcher JS-1

=== SELA ===
(Société d'Etude pour la Locomotion Aérienne)

- SELA monoplane

=== Selex ES ===
(Selex ES, Rome Italy.)

- Selex ES Falco
- Selex ES Falco EVO

=== Sellars ===
(Dr J Sellars, White Plains, New York, United States)

- Sellars Quadroplane

=== Sellers ===
(Matthew B Sellers Jr, Olive Hill, Kentucky, United States, Norwood, Ohio, United States, and Baltimore, Maryland, United States)

- Sellers Quadruplane a.k.a. Number 6
- Sellers Quadruplane (very little info available)

=== Sellet-Pelletier ===
(Christian Sellet & Jacques Pelletier)

- Sellet-Pelletier Grillon 120

=== Sellick ===
(William Sellick, Cicero, Illinois, United States)

- Sellick 1913 Monoplane

=== Sellmer ===
(Jacob P Sellmer, San Rafael, California, United States)

- Sellmer Incubator
- Sellmer 1932 helicoplane

=== Selvage ===
(Blaine Selvage, Humboldt City, California, United States)

- Selvage 1909 Monoplane

=== SEMA ===
(Société d'Etudes de Matériels d'Aviation)

- SAB-SEMA 10 (Societé Aérienne Bordelaise – Societé d'Etudes de Materiel d'Aviation)
- SAB-SEMA 12 (Societé Aérienne Bordelaise – Societé d'Etudes de Materiel d'Aviation)

=== Sénaud ===
(Armelle Sénaud)

- Sénaud C1
- Sénaud single-engined flying boat
- Sénaud twin-engined flying boat
- Sénaud AS 10 Mistral

=== SEPECAT ===
(Société Européenne de Production de l'avion ECAT (Ecole de Combat et d'Appui tactique), France/United Kingdom)

- SEPECAT Jaguar

=== Sequoia ===
(Sequoia Aircraft Co, Richmond, Virginia, United States)

- Sequoia 300
- Sequoia 301
- Sequoia 302 Kodiak
- Sequoia F.8L Falco

=== Seremet ===
(W. Vincent Seremet)

- Seremet WS.1
- Seremet WS.2
- Seremet WS.3
- Seremet WS.4
- Seremet WS.4A
- Seremet WS.5
- Seremet WS.6
- Seremet WS.7
- Seremet WS.8

=== SERLAG ===
- SERLAG 225EX

=== Servais ===
(Pierre Servais)

- Servais light aircraft
- Servais PS.10 Paul Vergnes

=== Servoplant ===
(Bucharest, Romania)

- Servoplant Aerocraft

=== Sessions ===
(Claude Sessions, Waynesville, Illinois and Owensburg, Kentucky, United States)

- Sessions 1922 Biplane
- Owensburg 1925 Biplane

=== Servicair ===
(Servicair Co, Glendale, California, United States)

- Servicair Loadmaster

=== SET ===
(Societatea pentru exploatari technice)

- Proto-SET 2
- SET 1
- SET 3
- SET 4
- SET 7
- SET 10
- SET X
- SET XV
- SET 31
- SET 41
- SET 61 ??

=== SETCA ===
(Société d'Études Techniques et de Constructions Aéronautiques)

- SETCA Milan
- SETCA LLP Petrel

=== Seux ===
(Edmond Seux (1869–1909))

- Aéroplane Edmond Seux

=== Seversky ===
(Seversky Aircraft Corporation, United States) see also Republic

- Seversky SEV-1XP
- Seversky SEV-2XP
- Seversky SEV-3
- Seversky SEV-5
- Seversky SEV-6
- Seversky SEV-7
- Seversky AP-1
- Seversky AP-2
- Seversky AP-4
- Seversky AP-7
- Seversky AP-9
- Severski 1926 Biplane
- Seversky 2PA
- Seversky EP-1-68 (Export Pursuit)
- Seversky EP-106 (Export Pursuit)
- Seversky NF-1
- Seversky Navy Type S Two-Seat Fighter
- Seversky A8V
- Seversky AT-12
- Seversky BT-8
- Seversky SEV-X-BT
- Seversky FN
- Seversky P-35
- Seversky XP-41
- Seversky Super Clipper

=== Seville ===
(Seville Aircraft Inc.)

- Seville Two Place

=== SEVIMIA ===
(Société d'Études VIctor MInié Aéronautiques)

- SEVIMIA 20

=== Seyedo Shohada ===
- Seyedo Shohada Zafar 300

=== Sexton ===
(Cicero, Illinois, United States)

- Sexton Monoplane
