= Aerocraft (disambiguation) =

Aerocraft may refer to:

- Aerocraft, alternative spelling of aircraft
- Aero-Craft Aero-Coupe, an American, three-passenger aircraft introduced in 1928
- Servoplant Aerocraft, a Romanian agricultural ultralight biplane
- Timm Aerocraft 2AS, an American aircraft introduced in 1941
