= Albin Moroder =

Austrian sculptor (1922–2007)

Albin Moroder (born 6 December 1922 in Schlitters in Zillertal; died 17 November 2007 in Mayrhofen) was an Austrian sculptor.

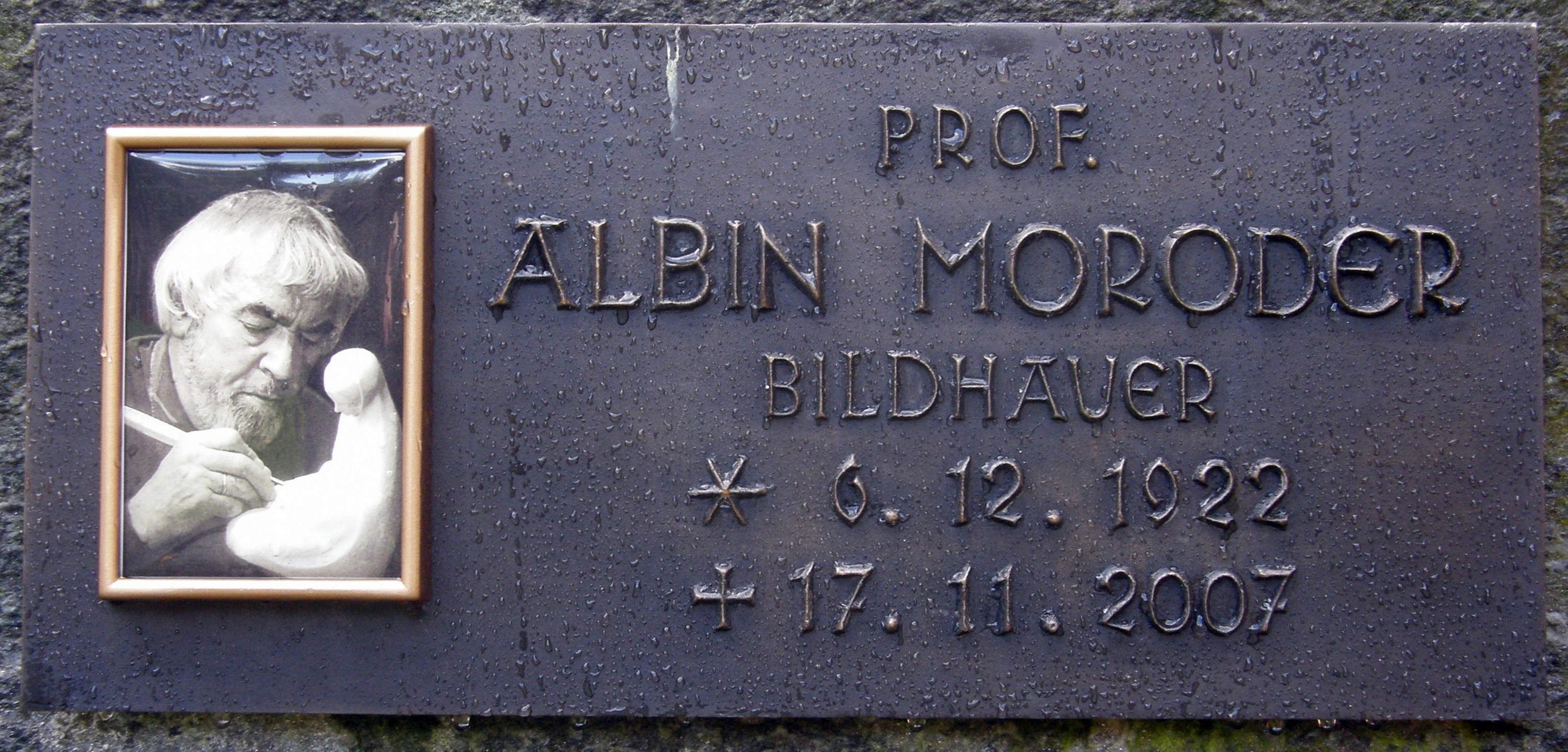
Grave plate with a portrait on the forest cemetery Mayrhofen

== Biography ==
Albin Moroder was the second born son of Otto Moroder and Anna Moroder, b. Knottner, as well as a grandson of the artist Josef Moroder Lusenber. Albin grew up in Schlitters in Zillertal, in 1927 the whole family moved to a house in Mayrhofen newly built by their father, where a lively tourism industry flourished and brought an economic boom to the then poor region. Because his older brother Klaus was an apprentice to his father as a wood sculptor, his father was able to register his son Albin, who was also seeking this profession, for higher education at the Peter-Anich-Gewerbeschule in Innsbruck under Professor Hans Pontiller. After half a year school attendance, however, Albin Moroder decided to renounce to his education because he did not feel well cared for, and yet completed the Holzbildhauer teaching within the family. Early on Albin Moroder felt in his work "the need to simplify everything and make it more modern". Thus, he has created more modern, but always representational figures, which he also showed at major exhibitions in Vienna, Paris, London and Salzburg. He has dealt mainly with the Christian motif of the crucifix. As a material of his work, he mainly uses wood, but also bronze.

In 1945 he married Erika Kuss in his first marriage. From this marriage, a total of five children were born: Gisela, Beate, Rainer, Patrick and Catrin. After the death of his first wife, he married his second wife Christina. As a young husband with three children in 1948, he had the opportunity to study in England. Here he met the sculptor Henry Moore, with whom he worked together for some time in his studio at Moore's invitation. Moroder also worked as a singer and musician. As a minstrel Moroder, published in 1986 an LP entitled Songs from Heart to Heart. The song Flowers of Love was released as a single. On 14 February 1994 he was awarded the title of Professor by the Austrian Federal President.

The bronze sculpture "Grief - Hope - Confidence" was erected in 2002 on behalf of the community Mayrhofen and in front of the local church on the area of the former churchyard.

Albin Moroder worked until his death and was still creative and presented in a private audience in November 2005 to Pope Benedict XVI a crucifix. Moroder's grave is located on the Waldfriedhof Mayrhofen.

== Gallery ==
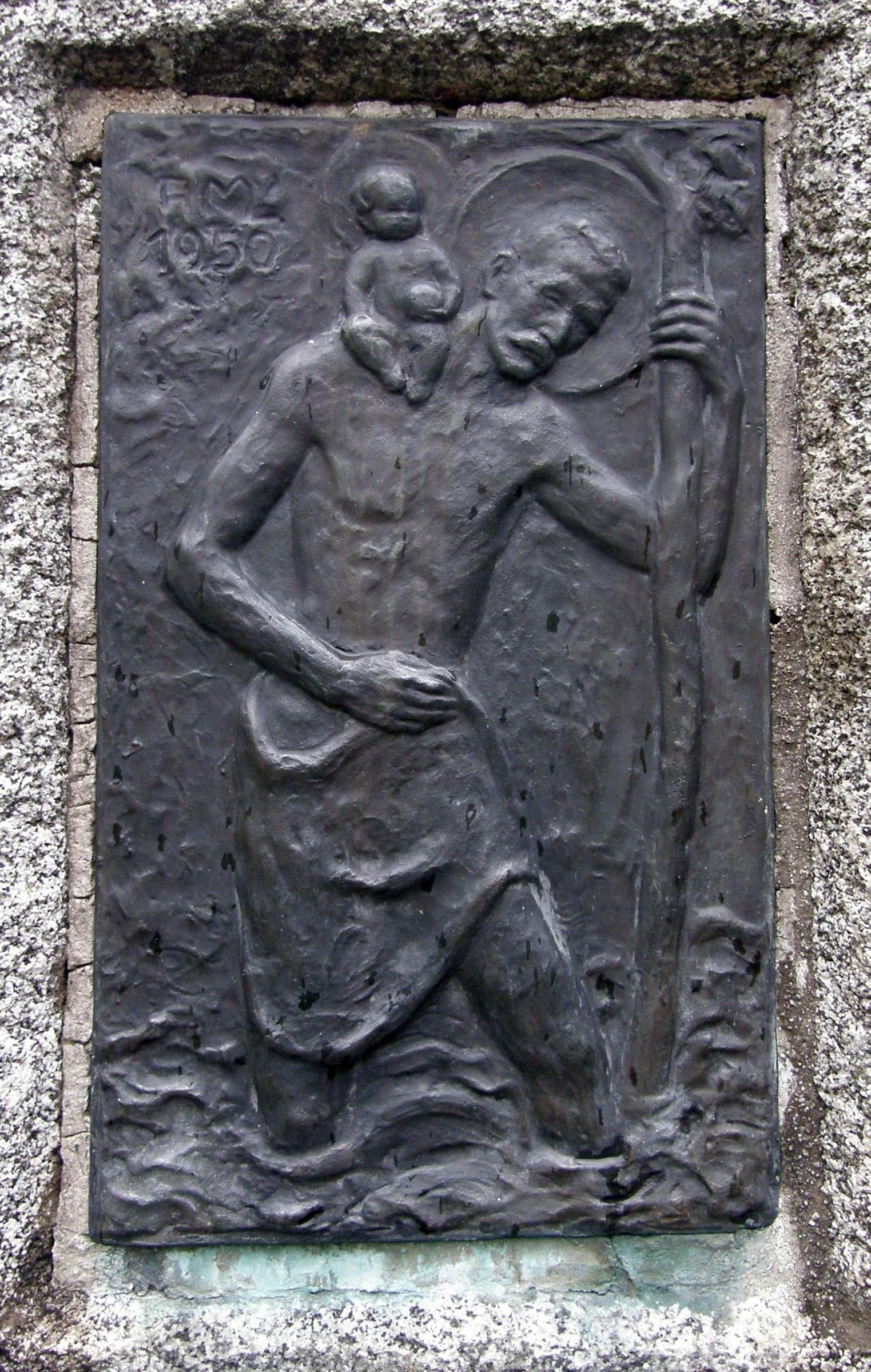
Christ created in 1950 relief

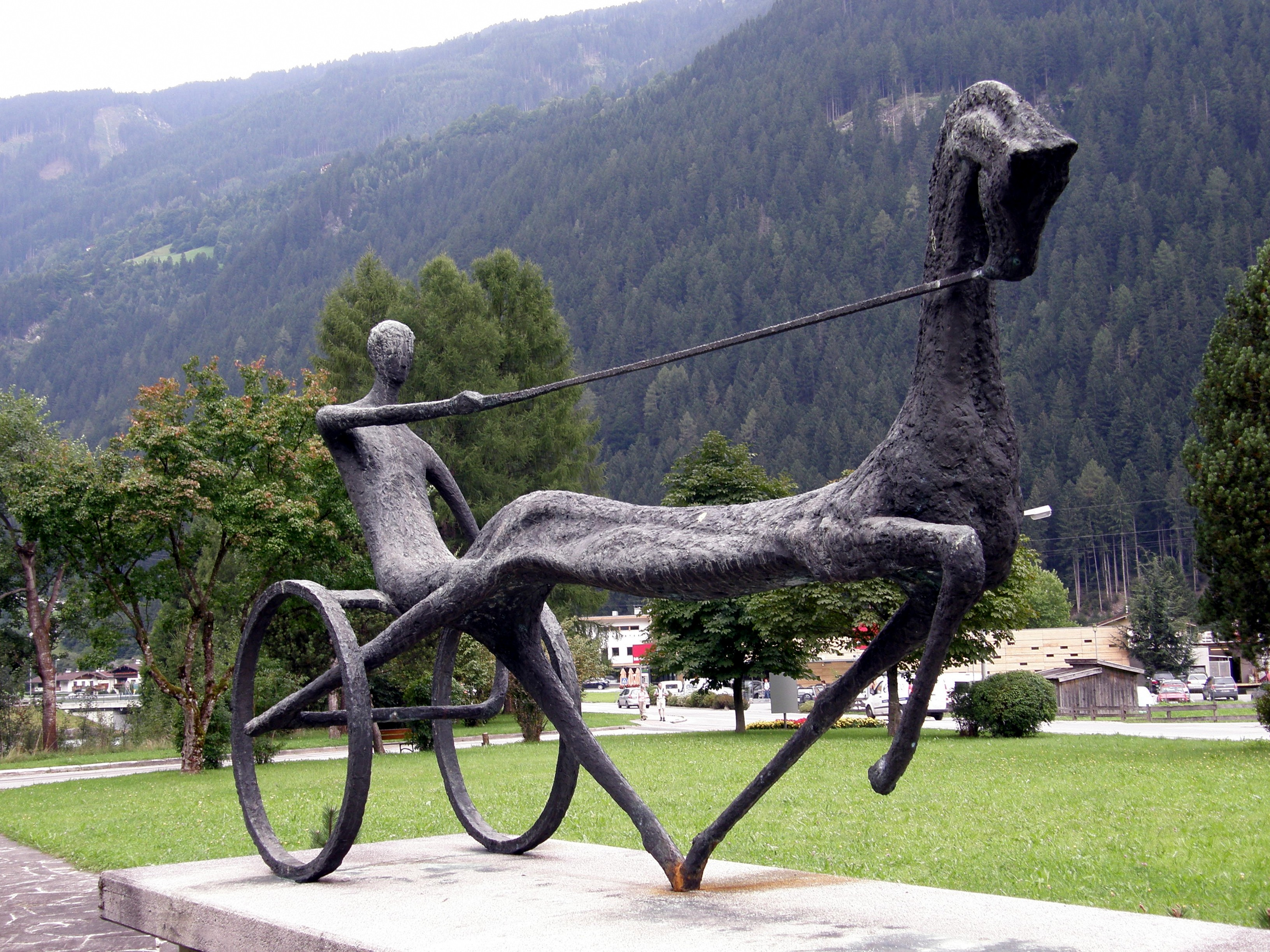
Sculpture "bridled force" from 1970 to 1971

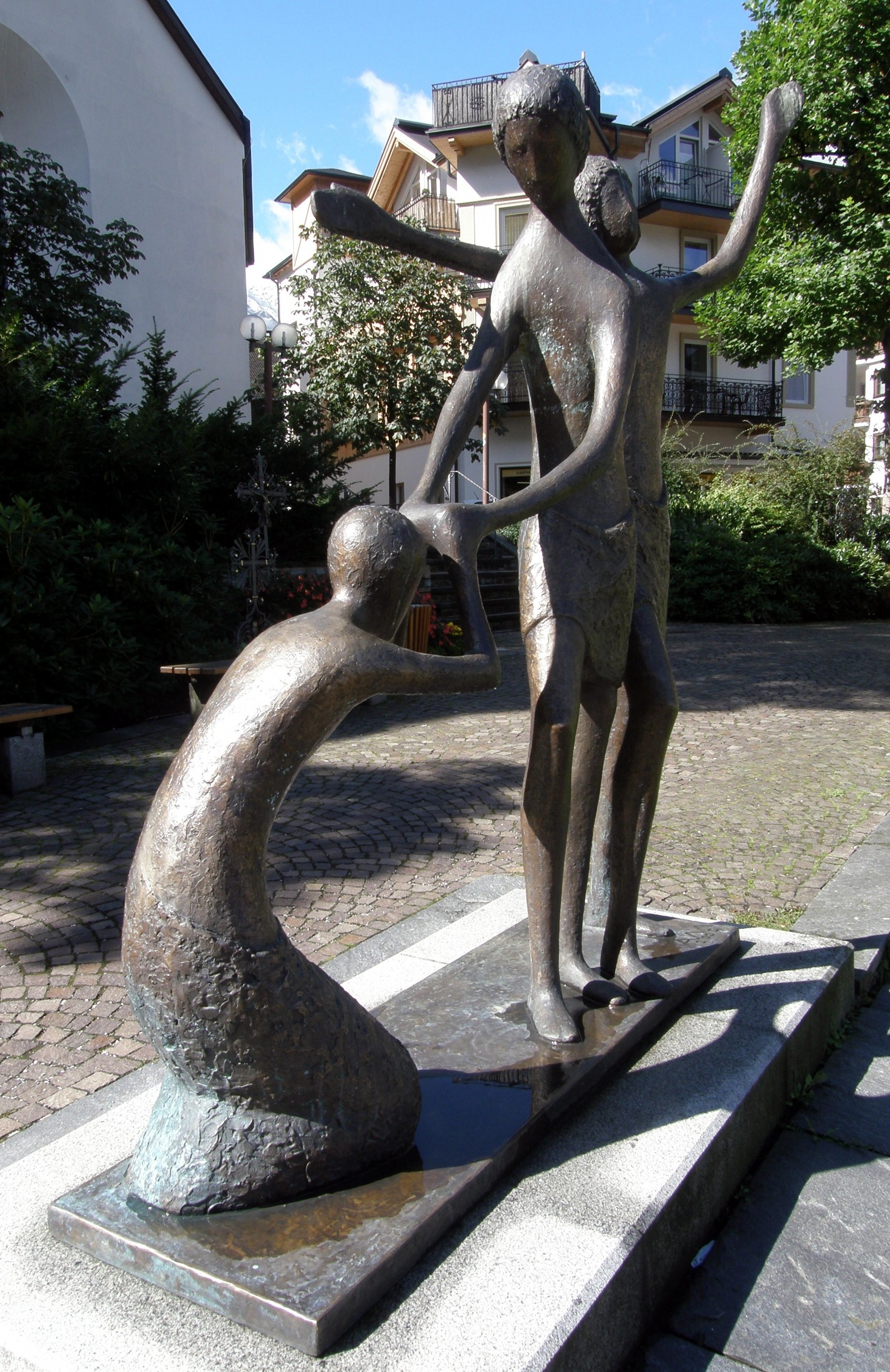
Sculpture "Grief-Hope-Confidence" from 2002
