= Sea-Bow =

Sea-Bow may refer to:

- Sea-Bow International, a Canadian aircraft manufacturer
- Sea-Bow International Sea-Bow, the aircraft they build
