= Seedwings Europe =

Austrian aircraft manufacturer

- Company type: Privately held company
- Industry: Aerospace
- Founded: 1987
- Fate: bankruptcy
- Headquarters: Schlitters, Austria
- Products: Hang gliders and harnesses
- Website: www.seedwings.eu

Seedwings Europe (formally Seedwings Airsports GmbH) was an Austrian aircraft manufacturer based in Schlitters and founded in 1987. The company specialized in the design and manufacture of hang gliders in the form of ready-to-fly aircraft as well as hang glider harnesses.

The company was organized as a Gesellschaft mit beschränkter Haftung (GmbH), a limited liability company.

By October 2017 the company's website domain was up for sale and the company seems to gone out of business.

Seedwings Europe produced a wide range of hang gliders, including the intermediate Crossover XC, and Crossover XCS models, the beginner Funky, the high performance Skyrunner XR and Skyrunner XRS and the early intermediate level Space. In the 2000s the company produced the intermediate level Kestrel and Merlin, as well as the competition level topless Vertigo model.

== Aircraft ==
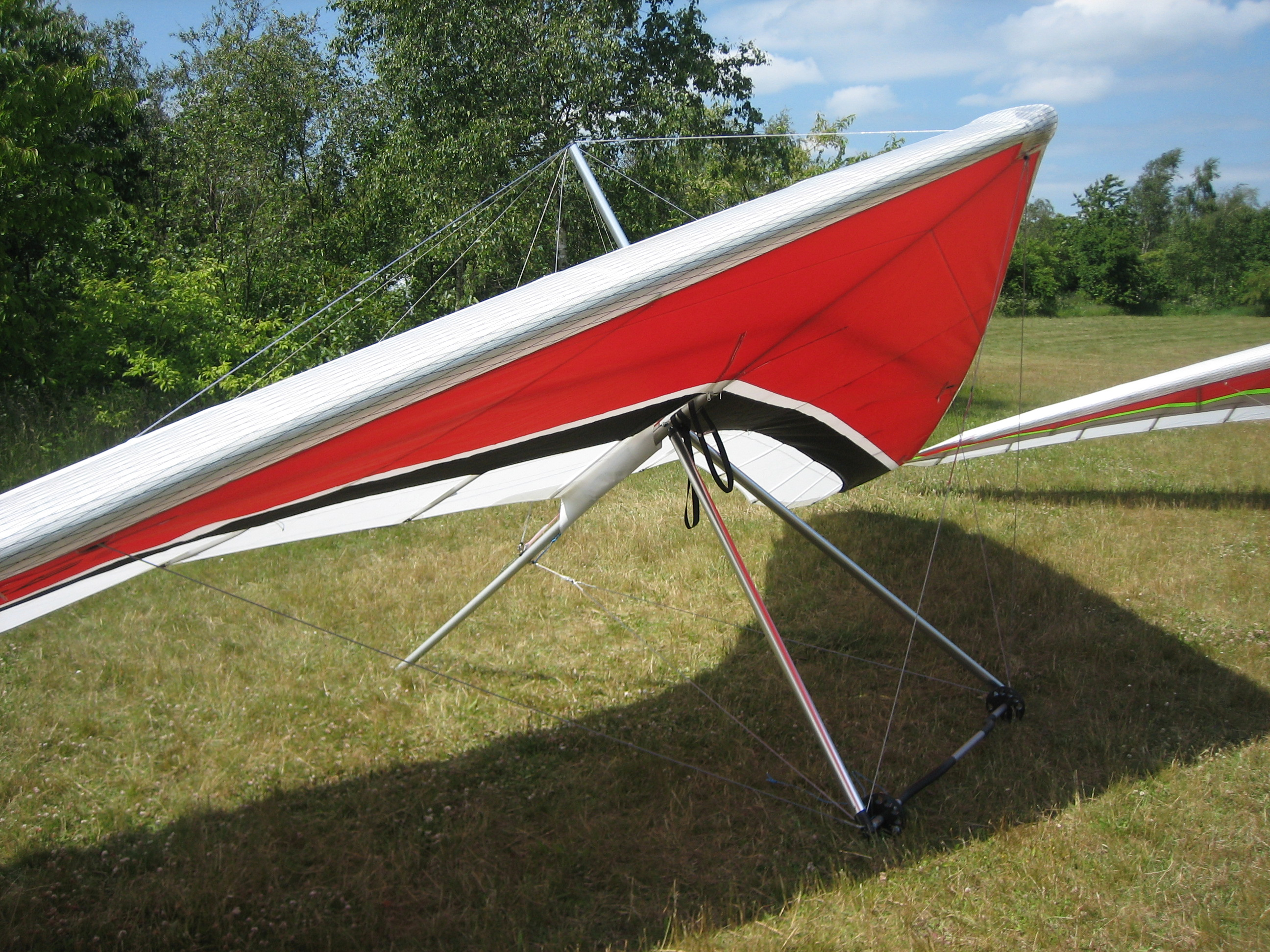
Seedwings Europe Space

Summary of aircraft built by Seedwings Europe
Model name	First flight	Number built	Type
Seedwings Europe Kestrel	mid-2000s		hang glider
Seedwings Europe Merlin	mid-2000s		hang glider
Seedwings Europe Vertigo	mid-2000s		hang glider
Seedwings Europe Funky	mid-2010s		hang glider
Seedwings Europe Space	mid-2010s		hang glider
Seedwings Europe Skyrunner XR	mid-2010s		hang glider
Seedwings Europe Skyrunner XRS	mid-2010s		hang glider
Seedwings Europe Crossover XC	mid-2010s		hang glider
Seedwings Europe Crossover XCS	mid-2010s		hang glider
