= THK-11 =

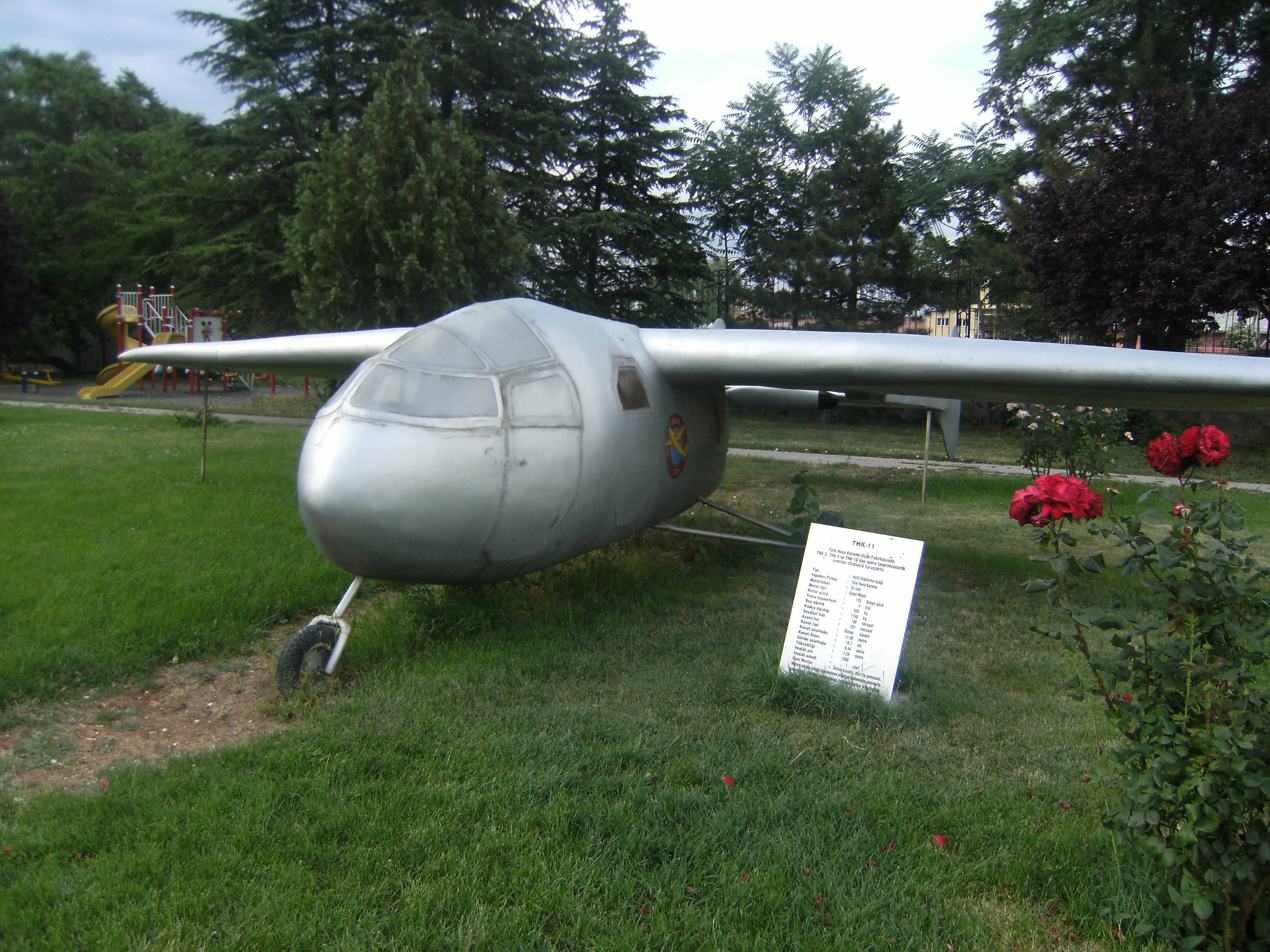
- A replica THK-11 on display at the Ankara Türk Hava Kurumu Müzesi - (Ankara Turkish Aeronautical Museum)

General information
- Type: Cabin monoplane
- National origin: Turkey
- Manufacturer: Türk Hava Kurumu (THK - Turkish Aeronautical Association)
- Status: Abandoned
- Number built: 1

History
- First flight: 1947

The THK 11 was a 1940s prototype Turkish four-seat monoplane, designed by Stanisław Rogalski and built by Türk Hava Kurumu (THK - Turkish Aeronautical Association).

== Design and development ==
The THK-11 was a high-wing twin-boom cantilever cabin monoplane with a 135 hp (101 kW) de Havilland Gipsy Major piston engine driving a pusher propeller. It has a fixed nose-wheel landing gear and was first flown in 1947.

== Specifications ==
Data from Jane's All The World's Aircraft 1951–52, Jane's All The World's Aircraft 1949–50

General characteristics

- Crew: 2
- Capacity: 1 passenger
- Length: 8.44 m (27 ft 8 in)
- Wingspan: 11.80 m (38 ft 9 in)
- Height: 2.59 m (8 ft 6 in)
- Wing area: 18.7 m^{2} (201 sq ft)
- Empty weight: 828 kg (1,825 lb)
- Gross weight: 1,150 kg (2,535 lb)
- Powerplant: 1 × de Havilland Gipsy Major four-cylinder air-cooled inverted in-line engine, 101 kW (135 hp)
- Propellers: 2-bladed fixed-pitch pusher propeller

Performance

- Maximum speed: 201 km/h (125 mph, 109 kn)
- Cruise speed: 164 km/h (102 mph, 89 kn)
- Landing speed: 80 km/h (50 mph; 43 kn)
- Range: 800 km (500 mi, 430 nmi) in still air
- Service ceiling: 3,500 m (11,500 ft)
- Rate of climb: 3.5 m/s (690 ft/min)
- Wing loading: 61.5 kg/m^{2} (12.6 lb/sq ft)
- Power/mass: 11.4 kg/kW (18.7 lb/hp)

== See also ==
- Twin-boom aircraft

Aircraft of comparable role, configuration, and era

- SECAN Courlis
