= SETCA Milan =

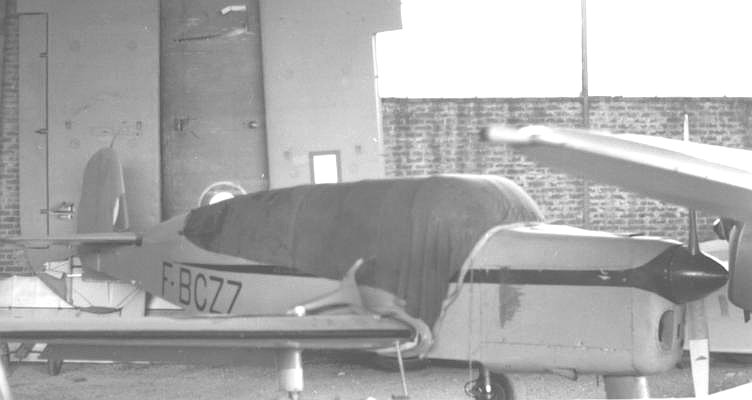
- The SETCA Milan prototype at Moisselles airfield near Paris in May 1957

General information
- Type: two-seat light utility aircraft
- National origin: France
- Manufacturer: SETCA
- Status: withdrawn
- Number built: 1

History
- First flight: 1947

The SETCA Milan was a French-built two-seat light utility aircraft of the 1940s manufactured by SETCA (Société d'Études Techniques et de Constructions Aéronautiques).

== Design and development ==
The Milan was designed by Messrs. Laboureix and Lagrevol as a two-seat side-by-side light utility aircraft. It was of all-wood construction with a fixed spatted tricycle undercarriage and had dual controls. Powered by a 90 hp (67 kW) Regnier 4E.0 inverted inline engine, it first flew in 1947.

== Production and service ==
The Milan obtained its CNRA in August 1949. Its normal certificat de navigabilite was awarded in 1952. The prototype F-BCZZ was flown until at least 1957, but plans for further production did not reach fruition.

== Specifications ==
Data from The Aircraft of the World

General characteristics

- Length: 7.34 m (24 ft 1 in)
- Wingspan: 9.98 m (32 ft 9 in)
- Empty weight: 1,210 kg (2,668 lb)
- Gross weight: 1,742 kg (3,840 lb)
- Powerplant: 1 × Regnier 4E.0 4-cylinder inverted air-cooled in-line piston engine, 67 kW (90 hp)
- Propellers: 2-bladed fixed pitch propeller

Performance

- Maximum speed: 196 km/h (122 mph, 106 kn)
- Cruise speed: 180 km/h (110 mph, 97 kn)
