= SET 2 =

Romanian bomber/reconnaissance aircraft prototype

Proto S.E.T.2
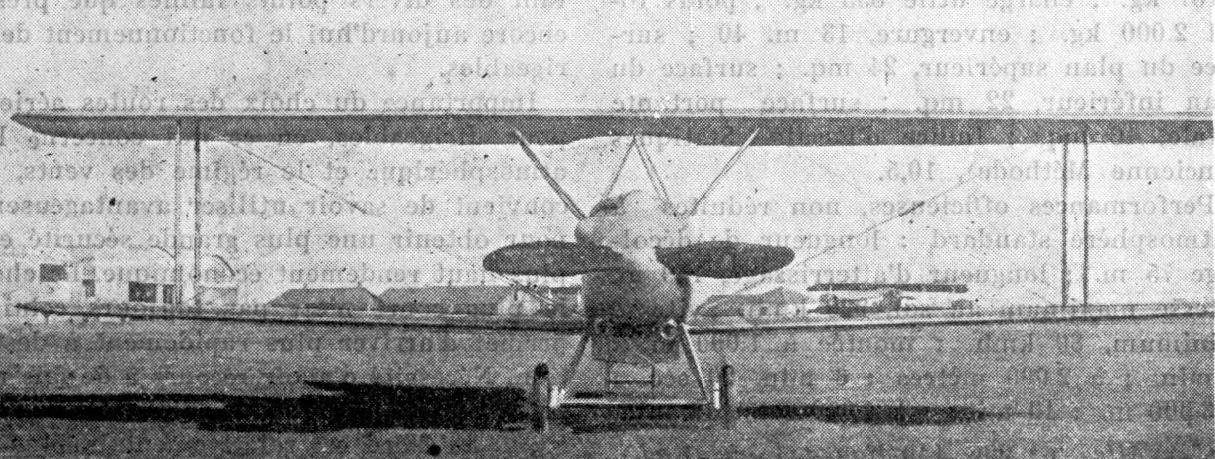

General information
- Type: Reconnaissance and day-bomber aircraft
- National origin: Romania
- Manufacturer: Societatea Pentru Exploatări Tehnice (SET)
- Designer: Stefan Protopopescu
- Number built: At least one

History
- First flight: between late 1926 and January 1927

The SET 2 or Proto-SET 2 was a 1920s Romanian prototype reconnaissance and day-bomber aircraft.

== Design and development ==
The SET 2, Lieutenant-Colonel Stefan Protopopescu's design for a reconnaissance and bomber aircraft, owed a good deal to the Astra-Protopopescu reconnaissance machine that he designed about two years earlier. A contraction of his name to Proto often appeared in variations of the new type's name. This was more powerful, over 25% greater in span and differed in many details, but shared the same layout and some features like the tail and the wing bracing were very similar. It was a wood-framed aircraft and only used locally resourced timber.

The SET 2 was a single bay biplane with fabric covered, two spar wings of equal span and rectangular plan, though the corners were blunted. Mounted with almost no stagger (a horizontal displacement of just 80 mm (3.1 in)), the wings were braced together by a pair of vertical interplane struts on each side, assisted by bracing wires. The lower wings, which unlike the upper one carried considerable dihedral, were attached to the lower fuselage longerons and the upper one was held high above the fuselage by two parallel sets of transverse W-form cabane struts. Ailerons, which reached the wing tips, were placed on the upper wing alone.

It had a nose-mounted, 340 kW (450 hp) Lorraine 12E Courlis W-12 engine water-cooled with a honeycomb radiator and a Lamblin oil cooler on the fuselage underside. The forward fuselage was ash framed, changing to pine aft. In the engine area it was covered with aluminium, the central part was fabric covered and the rear plywood skinned. The upper fuselage had a light, rounded wooden decking. There were two, tandem, open cockpits close to each other, with the forward one, from which it was flown, between the trailing edges. The upper edge had a rounded, almost semicircular cut out to improve the pilot's upward view and the lower edges had quadrantal cut-outs at the roots for downward vision. The rear cockpit had provision for a machine gun mounting. The fuselage tapered aft to conventional, unbalanced tail surfaces with a continuously curved tailplane and elevators positioned near the top of the fuselage. The fin and rudder were also smoothly curved together; the latter extended to the keel and worked in a rounded elevator cut-out.

The SET 2 had a conventional, fixed tailskid undercarriage. A short V-form strut was attached to each lower fuselage longeron, joined by a cross-piece at their apexes, above which a single axle bearing the main wheels was rubber sprung. The wooden tailskid was also rubber sprung.

== Operational history ==
The exact date of the SET 2's first flight is not known but the 2 February 1927 Les Ailes article notes that it had started tests "recently". The number built apart from the prototype is also uncertain but here is no known record of production or service. Despite promising early test results, development of the SET-2 was abandoned after an in-flight fire and forced landing during flight-testing.

== Specifications ==
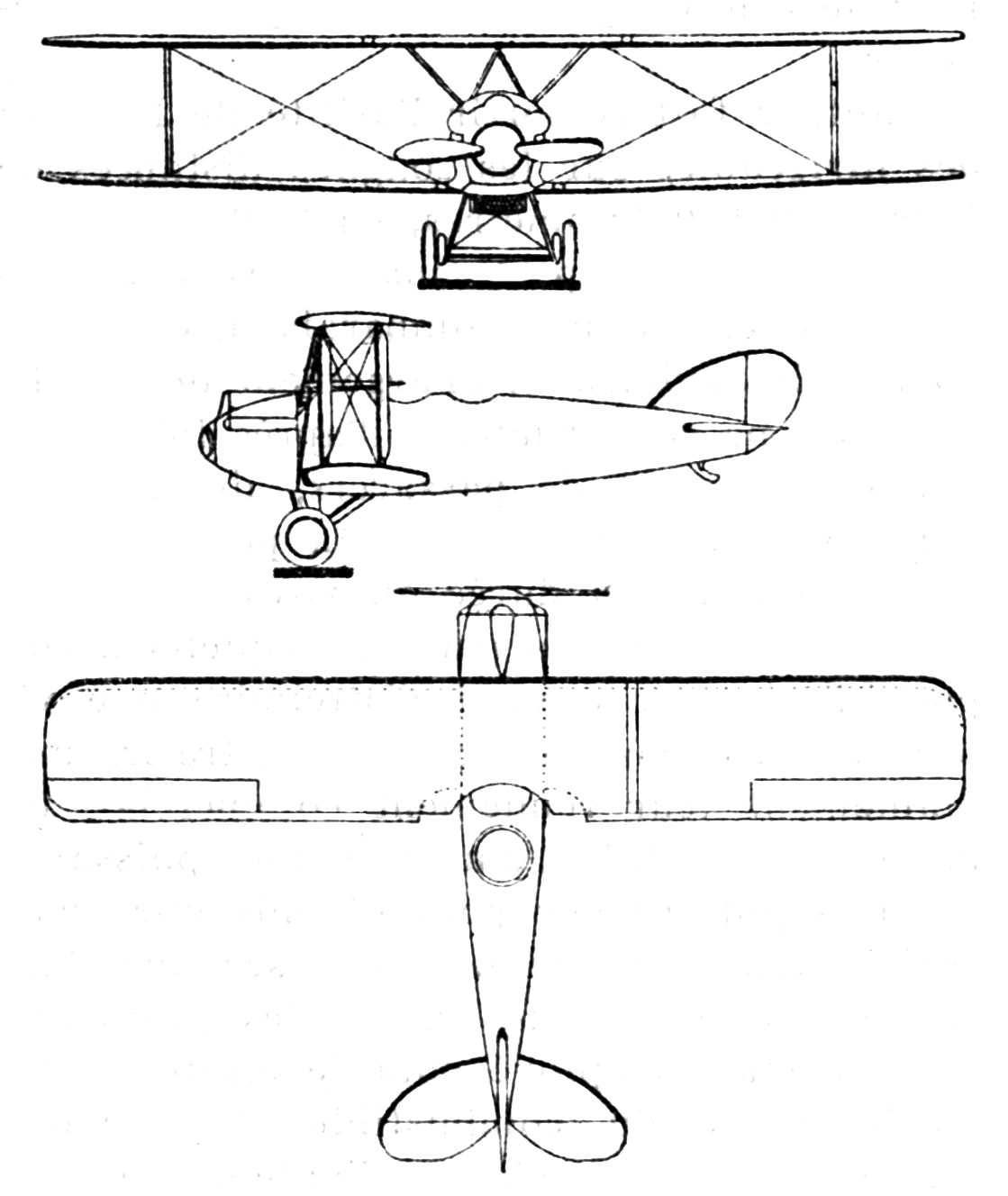
Proto S.E.T-2 3-view drawing from Le Document aéronautique March,1927

Data from Les Ailes February 1927, Romanian Aeronautical Constructions 1905 - 1974

General characteristics

- Crew: Two
- Length: 8.6 m (28 ft 3 in)
- Wingspan: 13.40 m (44 ft 0 in)
- Wing area: 24 m^{2} (260 sq ft) upper wing; lower wing 22 m^{2} (240 sq ft)
- Empty weight: 1,167 kg (2,573 lb)
- Gross weight: 2,000 kg (4,409 lb)
- Fuel capacity: 500 L (110 imp gal; 130 US gal)
- Powerplant: 1 × Lorraine 12E Courlis water-cooled W-12, 340 kW (450 hp)
- Propellers: 2-bladed Regy-Sabbah

Performance

- Maximum speed: 220 km/h (140 mph, 120 kn) at ground level
- Stall speed: 90 km/h (56 mph, 49 kn)
- Service ceiling: 7,000 m (23,000 ft)
- Time to altitude: 15 min to 3,000 m (9,800 ft), 29 minutes to 5,000 m (16,000 ft)
- Take-off distance:75 m (246 ft)
- Landing distance:150 m (490 ft)
