= SECAN Courlis =

French monoplane

SUC-10 Courlis
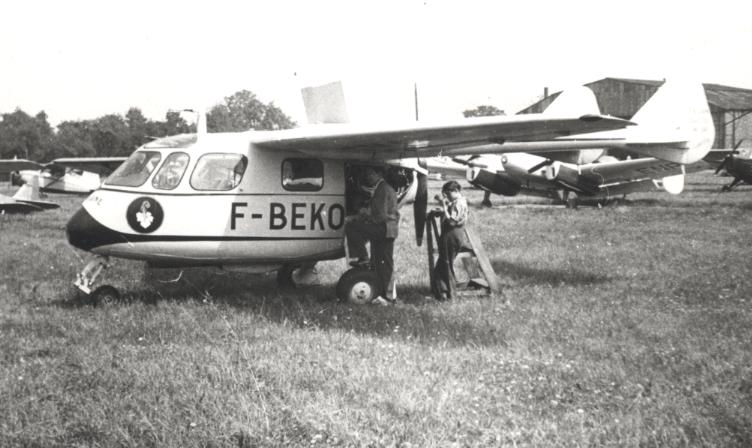
- SECAN SUC-10 Courlis at Sherburn-in-Elmet, Yorkshire, July 1951

General information
- Type: Touring cabin monoplane
- National origin: France
- Manufacturer: SECAN
- Number built: 144

History
- First flight: 9 May 1946

The SECAN SUC-10 Courlis (en: Curlew) was a French high-wing touring monoplane designed and built by Société d'Etudes et de Construction Aéronavales (SECAN), a branch of the automobile company Société des Usines Chaussons. The aircraft had problems with the engine installation and only 144 were built, some without engines and were scrapped.

== Development ==
The Courlis was an all-metal high-wing cantilever monoplane with twin booms supporting a tail unit. It was powered by a 190 hp (142 kW) Mathis G8R piston engine mounted in the rear fuselage in a pusher configuration. It had a fixed tricycle landing gear and had four seats in the enclosed cabin. The prototype, registered F-WBBF, first flew on 9 May 1946. Production was started and a total of 144 aircraft were completed with a number being exported to South America. Problems with the engine (insufficient power, cooling) resulted in the withdrawal of the engine's type certificate and some airframes were never fitted with an engine and scrapped. The company did test fit the aircraft with a 220 hp (164 kW) Mathis engine but production was ended.

The aircraft flew for some years, owned by French private pilots, but by the mid-1950s, most had been withdrawn from service, with many being stored at Mitry-Mory airfield near Paris.

In 1961 the design was revised as the SUC-11G Super Courlis with a 240 hp (179 kW) Continental O-470M engine, but was abandoned after a prototype was built.

== Variants ==
SUC-10 Courlis
Production variant with a 190hp Mathis G.8R engine, 144 built (not all flown).
SUC-11G Super Courlis
Improved design with a 240hp Continental O-470M engine, only one built.

== Aircraft on display ==
One aircraft is held by the Musée de l'Air et de l'Espace, Le Bourget, Paris, France, but is not currently (2007) on public display.

== Specifications (SUC-10 Courlis) ==
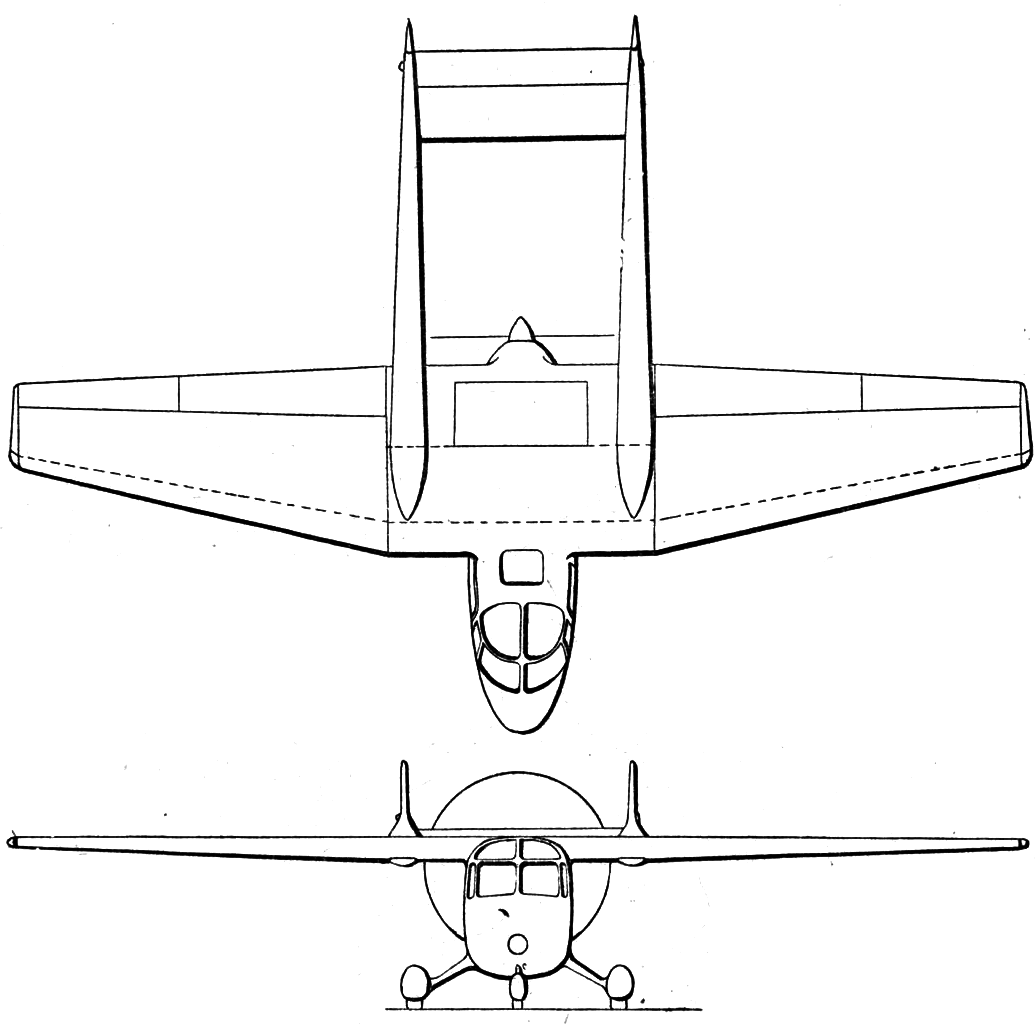
SECAN Courlis 2-view (modified) L'Aerophile magazine, June 1946

Data from , Jane's all the World's Aircraft 1947

General characteristics

- Crew: 1 (pilot)
- Capacity: 3 passengers
- Length: 8.18 m (26 ft 10 in)
- Wingspan: 12.35 m (40 ft 6 in)
- Height: 2.68 m (8 ft 10 in)
- Wing area: 19.10 m^{2} (205.6 sq ft)
- Empty weight: 895 kg (1,973 lb)
- Gross weight: 1,439 kg (3,172 lb)
- Max takeoff weight: 1,560 kg (3,439 lb)
- Fuel capacity: 200 L (53 US gal; 44 imp gal) in two centre-section tanks
- Powerplant: 1 × Mathis G.8R-40 air-cooled inverted-V piston engine, 149 kW (200 hp)
- Propellers: 2-bladed wooden fixed-pitch pusher propeller

Performance

- Maximum speed: 250 km/h (160 mph, 130 kn)
- Cruise speed: 220 km/h (140 mph, 120 kn) (70% power)
- Landing speed: 80 km/h (50 mph; 43 kn)
- Range: 1,230 km (760 mi, 660 nmi) with pilot and three passengers + luggage
- Service ceiling: 5,000 m (16,000 ft)

== See also ==
Aircraft of comparable role, configuration, and era

- Cessna 337
- THK-11
