= Security Airster S-1 =

Airster S-1

General information
- Type: Two-seat light monoplane
- National origin: United States
- Manufacturer: Security National Aircraft Corporation; American Aircraft Corporation
- Designer: Bert Kinner
- Number built: 19

History
- First flight: 1933

The Security Airster S-1 is an American two-seat single-engined monoplane designed by Bert Kinner and built by his Security National Aircraft Corporation later named the American Aircraft Corporation.

== Development ==
The Airster S-1 appeared in 1933 after the designer Bert Kinner had started the Security National Aircraft Corporation to build it. The Airster S-1-A was a side-by-side two-seat single-engined low-wing braced monoplane, it had folding wings and a fixed tailwheel landing gear. The aircraft was powered by one of Kinners engines the 100 hp (75 kW) Kinner K-5 radial. A coupe option was available to enclose the open cockpit. The economic situation in the United States of the early 1930s was not a good time to launch a light aircraft and only 15 were built when production of the S-1A stopped in January 1935. One of the purchasers of the aircraft turned out to be Edgar Rice Burroughs, author of the Tarzan series.

In 1939 with the company renamed the American Aircraft Corporation, Kinner attempted to restart production with a revised Airster S-1-B, again powered by his own engine a 125 hp (93 kW) Security S5-125 radial. Times were no better and only about five were built before the factory and assets were bought in 1942 by the National Airplane & Motor Company.

== Variants ==
Airster S-1
Prototypes powered by 100hp (75kW) Kinner K-5 radial engine, two built.
Airster S-1-A
Production version, 12 built.
Airster S-1-B
Revised 1939 variant with a 125hp (93kW) Security S5-125 radial engine, five built.

== Specifications (S-1-A) ==
Data from

General characteristics

- Crew: 2
- Length: 23 ft 11 in (7.29 m)
- Wingspan: 40 ft 0 in (12.19 m)
- Empty weight: 1,197 lb (543 kg)
- Gross weight: 1,775 lb (805 kg)
- Powerplant: 1 × Kinner K-5 radial piston engine, 100 hp (75 kW)

Performance

- Maximum speed: 100 mph (160 km/h, 87 kn)
- Cruise speed: 88 mph (142 km/h, 76 kn)
- Range: 300 mi (480 km, 260 nmi)
- Service ceiling: 14,000 ft (4,300 m)
