= SECAN =

French aircraft manufacturer

SECAN, Société d'Etudes et de Construction Aéro-Navales was a French aircraft manufacturer, a branch of the Société des usines Chausson (SUC).

== Aircraft ==
- SECAN Courlis (1946)
