= SECAT RG-60 =

RG-60

General information
- Type: Sports biplane
- National origin: France
- Manufacturer: SECAT
- Designer: Rémy Gaucher
- Number built: 1

The SECAT RG-60 was a prototype light sporting biplane built in France shortly after World War II. It was a conventional single-seat design with an open cockpit. The lower wing had a smaller span and chord than the upper wing and was braced against the upper wing and against the fuselage sides with I-struts but no wires. The undercarriage consisted of two fixed, divided main units plus a fixed tailskid. Power was supplied by a tractor-mounted piston engine that drove a two-bladed propeller. Construction was of wood throughout.

== History ==
The RG-60 was displayed together with other SECAT designs at the Semaine de l'Aviation légère (light aviation week) held at Toussus-le-Noble from 22 April 1947 but was already somewhat outdated by the standards of the time. SECAT produced no further examples, and if the RG-60 ever received a civil registration, the details are now lost.

== Specifications ==
Data from Jane's All The World's Aircraft 1948, except as noted

General characteristics

- Crew: one pilot
- Length: 4.95 m (16 ft 3 in)
- Wingspan: 5.00 m (15 ft 5 in)
- Height: 1.90 m (6 ft 3 in)
- Wing area: 9.5 m^{2} (102 sq ft)
- Empty weight: 180 kg (397 lb)
- Gross weight: 295 kg (650 lb)
- Powerplant: 1 × Train 4A , 30 kW (40 hp)

Performance

- Maximum speed: 190 km/h (118 mph, 103 kn)
- Range: 500 km (311 mi, 270 nmi)
- Service ceiling: 5,000 m (16,400 ft)
