= SET 3 =

Romanian biplane trainer aircraft

SET 3 and SET 4
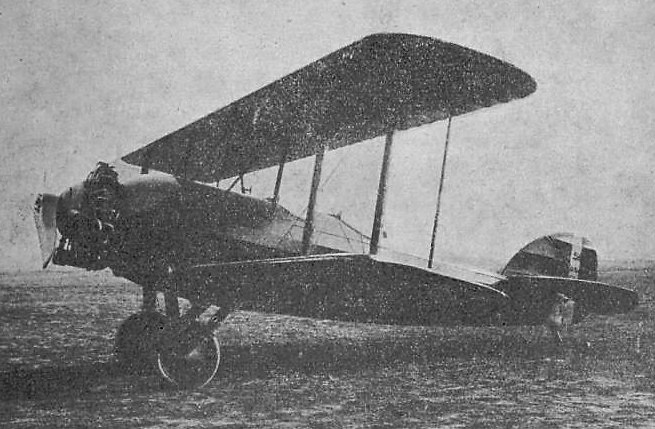
- SET 3

General information
- Type: Trainer aircraft
- Manufacturer: SET
- Designer: Grigore Zamfirescu

History
- First flight: 1928

The SET 3 was a military trainer aircraft developed in Romania in the late 1920s. It was a conventional single-bay biplane with unstaggered wings of equal span. It was equipped with fixed tailskid undercarriage, and the pilot and instructor sat in tandem, open cockpits. The design was submitted to the Romanian Air Force for consideration, and elicited sufficient interest to result in an order for two prototypes to be placed. Upon delivery, one of the aircraft was used for flight tests, while the other was tested on the ground. After nearly a year, an order for 10 aircraft was placed, which were delivered to the air force's pilot training school at Tecuci. The new trainer soon found recognition, flown by SET chief test pilot Gheorghe Stefanescu to first place in the aerobatics competition at the 1929 Romanian national aviation meet, and by Lt Octav Oculeanu to win the Aviator Mircea Zorileanu Cup at Bucharest later that year.

In December 1930, the air force placed an order for 20 more aircraft in two slightly different batches. Ten were to be essentially similar to the SET 3 but feature various refinements including a redesigned undercarriage, and another ten similar to these but armed with machine guns for pilot and observer.

Apart from these standard production models, a number of "one-off" aircraft were developed, including the 41 and 41S - a night-flying trainer and a combat-trainer respectively. Ionel Ghica flew the special 31G named Foisor on a long-distance flight from Bucharest to Saigon between 30 March and 16 April 1932, covering 9,350 km (5,810 mi) in 2 days, 14 hours, and 25 minutes. In another feat, Locotenent-comandor Gheorghe Banciulescu, who had two wooden legs, flew the 41R on a 9,000 km (5,600 mi) tour of 15 European countries over nine days.

== Variants ==
SET 3
original trainer version with
SET 31
refined version with divided undercarriage
SET 31G
("Ghica") long-distance version for Ionel Ghica
SET 4
armed reconnaissance version
SET 41
night-trainer
SET 41R
("Record") long-distance version for Gheorghe Banciulescu to fly with prosthetics
SET 41S
("Special")

== Operators ==
Romania

- Royal Romanian Air Force

== Specifications (SET 31) ==
General characteristics

- Crew: Two, pilot and instructor
- Length: 7.20 m (23 ft 8 in)
- Wingspan: 9.80 m (32 ft 2 in)
- Height: 3.15 m (10 ft 4 in)
- Wing area: 26.0 m^{2} (286 sq ft)
- Empty weight: 826 kg (1,821 lb)
- Gross weight: 1,120 kg (2,470 lb)
- Powerplant: 1 × Salmson 9Ab , 170 kW (230 hp)

Performance

- Maximum speed: 215 km/h (133 mph, 116 kn)
- Service ceiling: 6,000 m (19,700 ft)
- Rate of climb: 5.3 m/s (1,040 ft/min)
