= SECAT RG-75 =

RG-75

General information
- Type: Light utility aircraft
- National origin: France
- Manufacturer: SECAT
- Designer: Rémy Gaucher
- Number built: 2

The SECAT RG-75 (sometimes designated SECAT 75T) was a light utility monoplane built in France shortly after World War II. It was a conventional cabin monoplane with two seats side-by-side. The wing was mounted high and was of fully cantilever design. The conventional undercarriage consisted of two fixed, divided main units plus a fixed tailskid. Power was supplied by a tractor-mounted piston engine that drove a two-bladed propeller. Construction was of wood throughout, covered in plywood.

== History ==
Two prototypes, registered F-WBBX and F-WBBT were tested at the CEV at Brétigny-sur-Orge in 1947 by pilots Marcel Joannès and Guy Buteau. Shortly afterwards, F-WBBT was displayed together with other SECAT designs at the Semaine de l'Aviation légère (light aviation week) held at Toussus-le-Noble from 22 April 1947 but was already somewhat outdated by the standards of the time. SECAT produced no further examples.

== Specifications ==
Data from Jane's All The World's Aircraft 1948

General characteristics

- Crew: one pilot
- Capacity: one passenger
- Length: 7.00 m (23 ft 0 in)
- Wingspan: 10.00 m (32 ft 10 in)
- Height: 1.90 m (6 ft 3 in)
- Wing area: 14.0 m^{2} (151 sq ft)
- Empty weight: 280 kg (617 lb)
- Gross weight: 500 kg (1,100 lb)
- Powerplant: 1 × Régnier 4D2 , 52 kW (70 hp)

Performance

- Maximum speed: 180 km/h (112 mph, 97 kn)
- Cruise speed: 170 km/h (106 mph, 92 kn)
- Range: 800 km (500 mi, 430 nmi)
- Service ceiling: 5,000 m (16,400 ft)
- Rate of climb: 3.5 m/s (639 ft/min)
