= SELA monoplane =

General information
- Type: Monoplane
- National origin: France
- Manufacturer: Société d'Etude pour la Locomotion Aérienne (SELA)
- Number built: 1

The SELA monoplane was an experimental monoplane built by Société d'Etude pour la Locomotion Aérienne (SELA) in the early 1910s. It was a middle-wing monoplane similar in layout to the Bleriot monoplanes.

== Specifications ==
Data from

General characteristics

- Crew: 1
- Length: 8.80 m (28 ft 10 in)
- Wingspan: 11.20 m (36 ft 9 in)
- Gross weight: 420 kg (926 lb)
- Powerplant: 1 × SELA V-8 V-8 air-cooled piston engine, 63 kW (85 hp)
- Propellers: 2-bladed fixed-pitch propeller

Performance

- Maximum speed: 116 km/h (72 mph, 63 kn)
