= Societatea Pentru Exploatări Tehnice =

Former Romanian aircraft manufacturer

Societatea Pentru Exploatări Technice
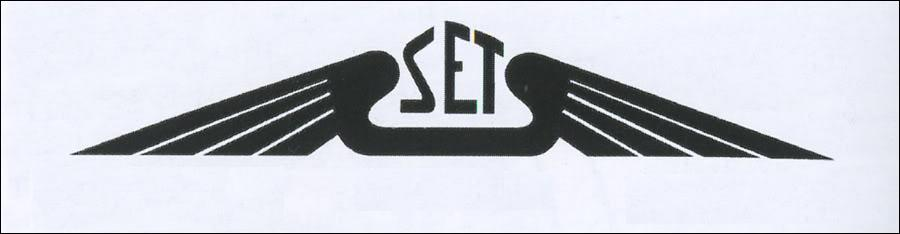
- Industry: Aerospace
- Founded: 1932
- Founder: Grigore Zamfirescu
- Defunct: ~1946
- Headquarters: Bucharest, Romania

Societatea Pentru Exploatări Technice or SET ("Technical Development Society") was a Romanian aircraft manufacturer. It was the second biggest Romanian pre-war aircraft manufacturer, after Industria Aeronautică Română (IAR).

== History ==
The Societatea Pentru Exploatări Tehnice was established in Bucharest in 1923 by Grigore Zamfirescu as a general machinery manufacturing plant. It soon specialised in building aircraft to its founder's design, supplying the Romanian Air Force with trainers during the mid-1930s. At the peak of aircraft production, Zamfirescu changed the company's name to Fabrica de Avioane SET.

In the late 1930s, SET abandoned producing its own designs, and manufactured a number of IAR and foreign types under licence, including the IAR 27, IAR 39, Fleet 10, and Nardi FN.305. In 1938, the company made a deal with the Romanian government that would have seen it relocate its manufacturing facilities to Moldavia, with the government promising to purchase a minimum order of aircraft each year from the new plant. This venture was to have been called "Industria Nationala Aeronautica" ("National Aeronautical Industry"), but it failed to materialise when the Second World War intervened. During the war, SET built Heinkel He 111s under licence.

SET continued to maintain and repair aircraft until the end of World War II, after which it continued business for a time outside the aeronautics industry.

== Products ==
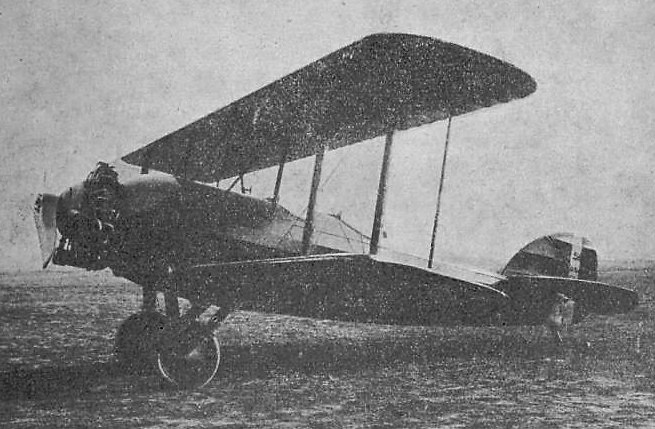
SET 3

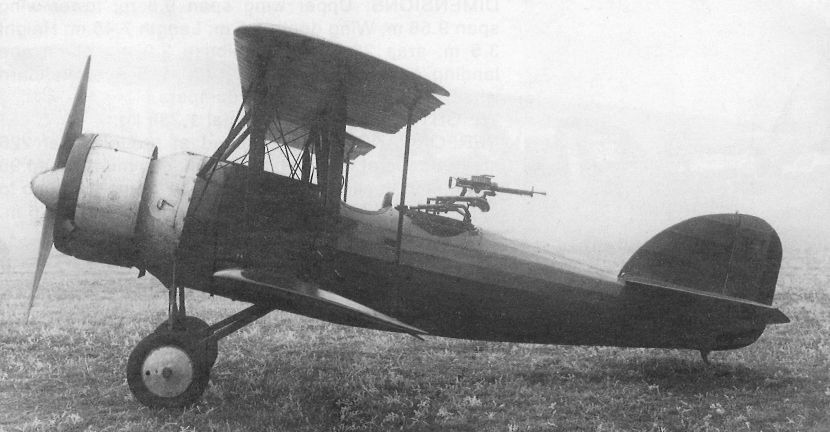
SET 7K

Model name	First flight	Number built	Type
SET 2		2	Single engine biplane reconnaissance airplane
SET 3	1928	10	Single engine biplane trainer
SET 31		20	Single engine biplane trainer
SET 7	1931	123	Single engine biplane trainer
SET 4		30	Single engine biplane reconnaissance airplane
SET 41		10	Single engine biplane trainer
SET XV	1934	1	Single engine biplane fighter
SET 10	1932	2	Single engine biplane trainer
SET FN.305		124	License built single engine monoplane trainer
SET 27	1937	80	License built single engine monoplane trainer
SET 39	1937	160	License built single engine biplane light bomber
SET F-10G	1939	80	License built single engine biplane trainer

== See also ==
- Industria Aeronautică Română (IAR)
- Întreprinderea de Construcții Aeronautice Românești (ICAR)
- Aviation in Romania
