= Falco F8L =

1955 sportplane family by Stelio Frati

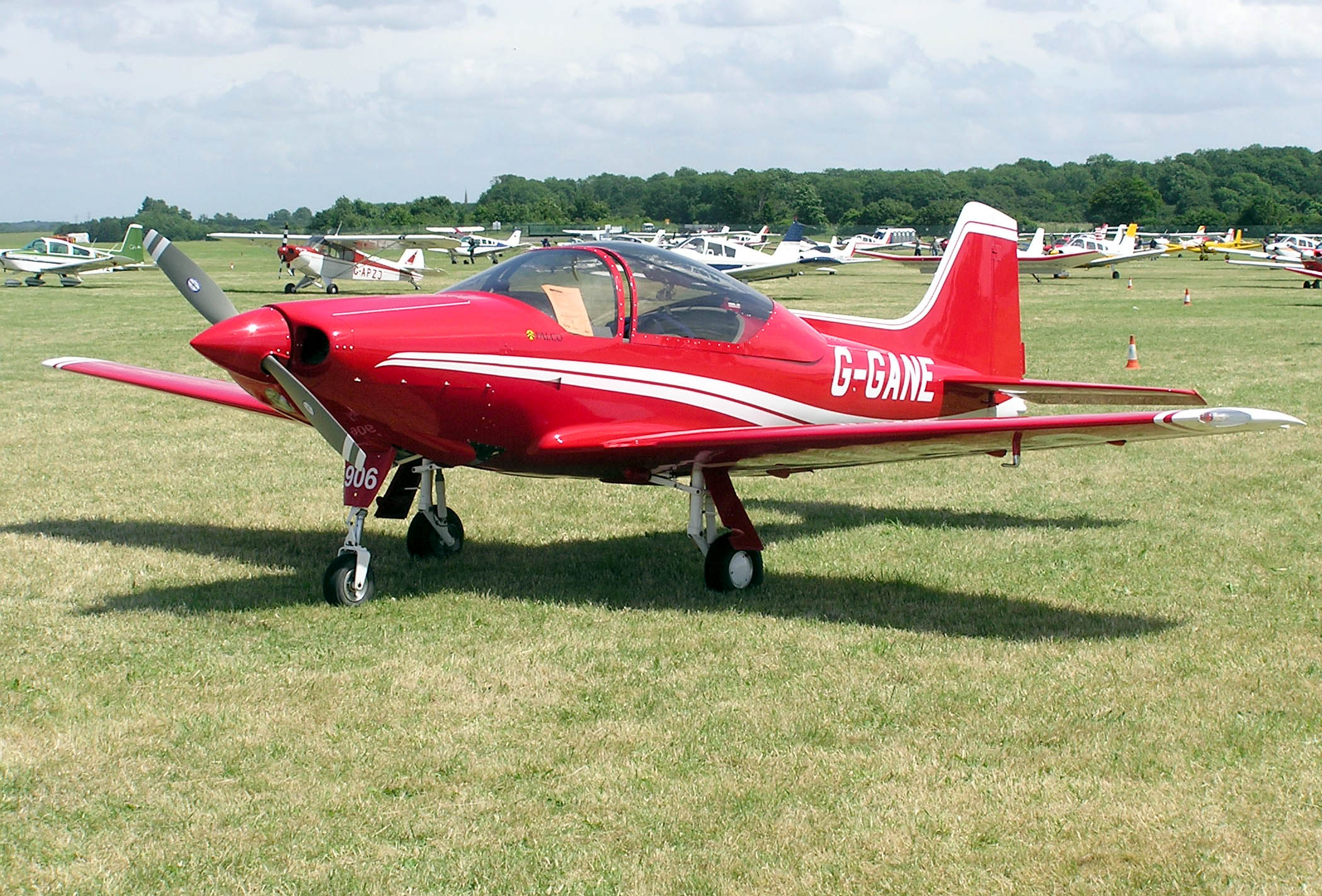
- 1993 Sequoia Falco F8L

General information
- Type: Homebuilt aircraft
- National origin: Italy
- Manufacturer: Aviamilano; Aeromere; Laverda; Sequoia Aircraft Company
- Designer: Stelio Frati
- Status: Production completed (2014)
- Number built: 90 (2011)

History
- First flight: 1955
- Variants: Sequoia 300, Sequoia 300, Sequoia Kodiak

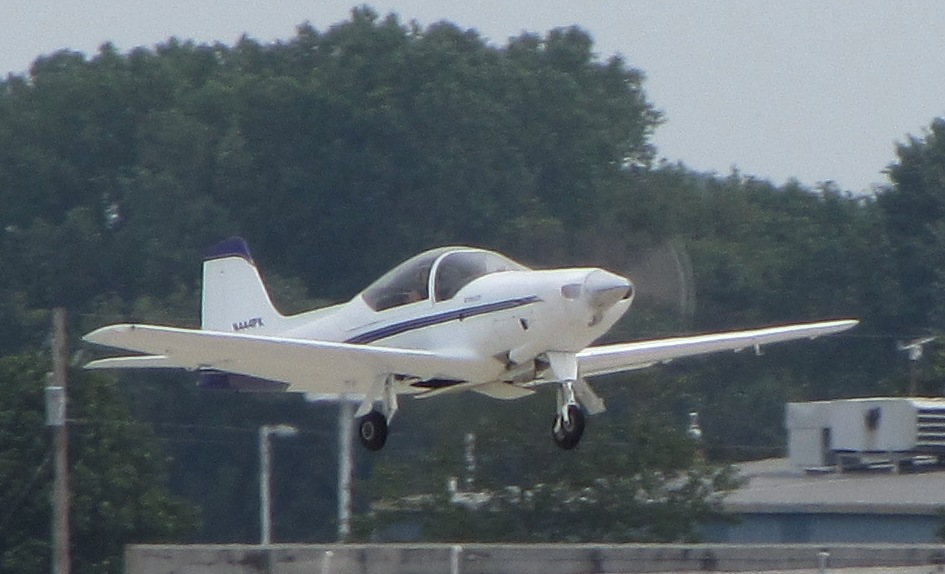
Sequoia Falco takeoff

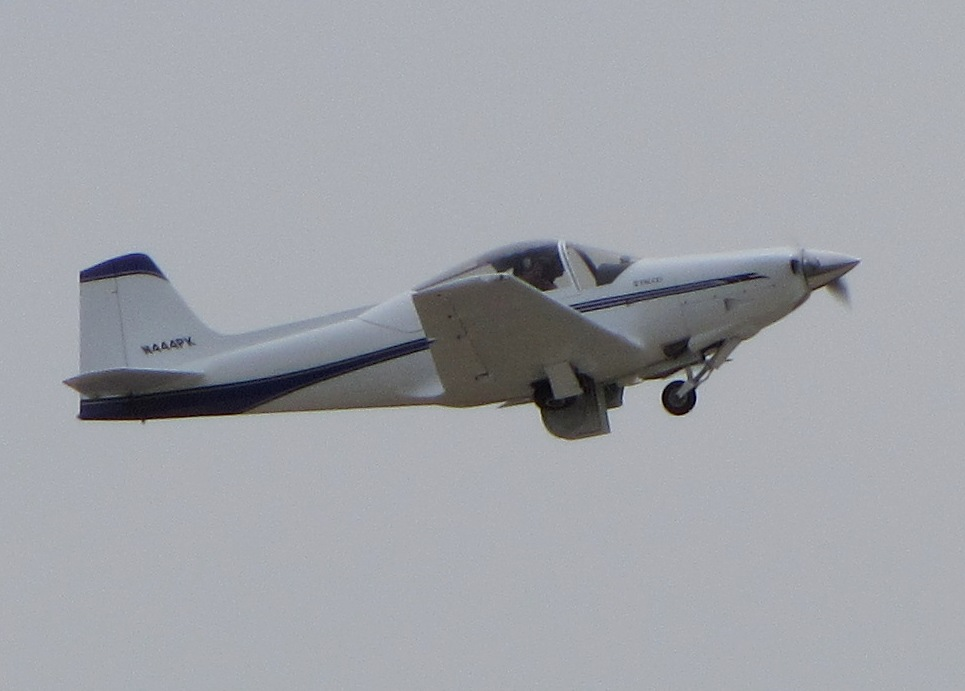
Sequoia Falco takeoff

The Falco F8L is an Italian-designed lightweight 2-seater aerobatic aircraft.

== Design and development ==
The aircraft was designed by the renowned Italian designer Stelio Frati in 1955, with the prototype, powered by a 90 hp (67 kW) Continental C-90 engine, flying for the first time on 15 June 1955. The prototype was soon re-engined with a 135 hp (101 kW) Lycoming O-290-D2B, forming the basis for the initial production batch. It was originally built in Italy by Aviamilano then Aeromere and later Laverda.

The aircraft is single-engined, propeller driven and designed for private and general aviation use. The Falco was sold in kit or plans form for amateur construction by the Sequoia Aircraft Company of Richmond, Virginia from the 1980s until its closure in 2014.

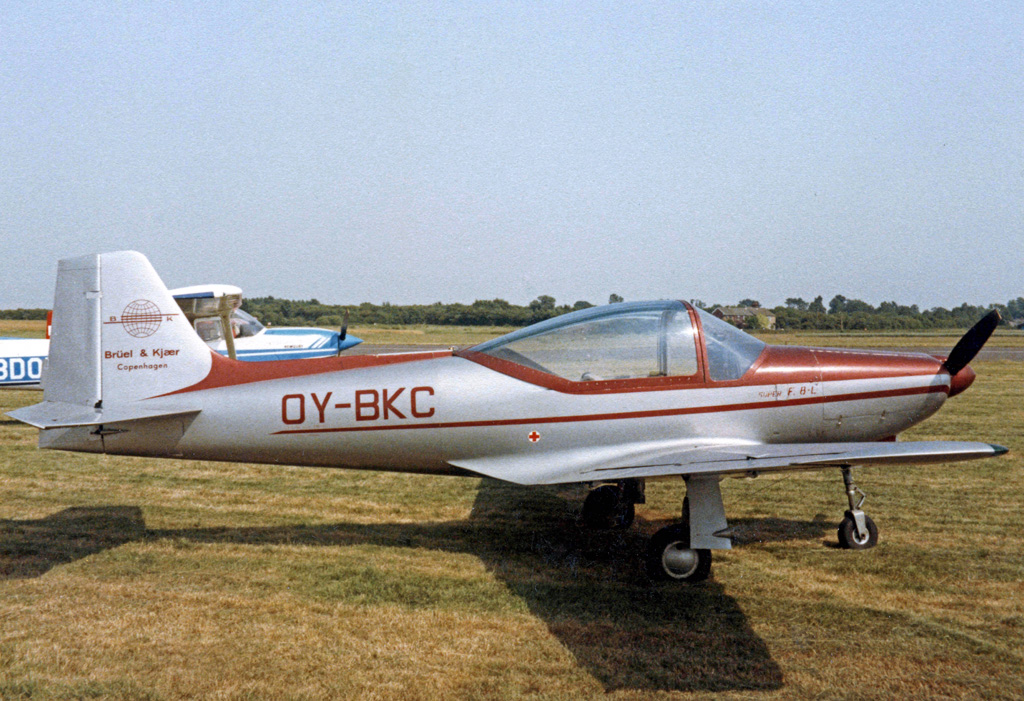
Laverda-built Falco IV from Denmark attending a UK air rally in 1984

The aircraft is widely considered to be one of the best handling, strongest, and most aesthetically pleasing designs ever made available to home builders. Pilots sometimes refer to the Falco as "the Ferrari of the air."

Performance includes a 175 knot cruise speed and full aerobatic capability, with an inverted fuel tank an optional item.

The Falco F8L is constructed of spruce and typically Finnish birch plywood. The structure is built from laminated spruce bulkheads and the birch plywood is used for the skin. The plywood is often softened with hot steam, formed over the various structures and glued in place. The aircraft is rated for 6g positive and 3g negative.

Reviewers Roy Beisswenger and Marino Boric described the design in a 2015 review as "a complex all-wooden construction in spruce and plywood and is therefore time-consuming to build. But the results in terms of weight and speed are remarkable., so much so that the Falco is considered a classic, with outstanding performance and handling."

== Variants ==
F.8L Series I
Initial production model powered by 101 kW (135 hp) Lycoming engine. Ten built by Aviamilano starting in 1956.
F.8L Series II
Improved model built by Aviamilano, with 112 kW (150 hp) engine. Twenty built.
F.8L Series III
(Also known as F.8L America) Modified version of Series II built by Aeromere in conformance with US airworthiness requirements. 35 built by Aeromere.
Super Falco Series IV
Similar to America, but with more powerful engine (160 hp (120 kW) Lycoming O-320-B3) and constant speed propeller. Built by Laverda. Twenty built.
Sequoia Falco
Similar to the production aircraft but re-designed for homebuilding from kits or plans, by Alfred Scott of Sequoia Aircraft Company and David Thurston of Lake Buccaneer fame.

== Specifications (Laverda Super Falco Series IV) ==
Data from Jane's All The World's Aircraft 1965-66

General characteristics

- Crew: one
- Capacity: one passenger
- Length: 6.50 m (21 ft 4 in)
- Wingspan: 8.00 m (26 ft 3 in)
- Height: 2.27 m (7 ft 5 in)
- Wing area: 10.0 m^{2} (108 sq ft)
- Aspect ratio: 6.4:1
- Airfoil: NACA 64213
- Empty weight: 550 kg (1,213 lb)
- Max takeoff weight: 820 kg (1,808 lb)
- Fuel capacity: 120 L (32 US gal; 26 imp gal)
- Powerplant: 1 × Lycoming O-320-B1A air-cooled flat-four engine, 120 kW (160 hp)
- Propellers: 2-bladed Hartzell fixed-pitch propeller, 1.75 m (5 ft 9 in) diameter

Performance

- Maximum speed: 325 km/h (202 mph, 175 kn) at sea level
- Cruise speed: 250 km/h (160 mph, 130 kn) (econ. cruise)
- Stall speed: 98 km/h (61 mph, 53 kn) (30% flaps)
- Never exceed speed: 385 km/h (239 mph, 208 kn)
- Range: 1,400 km (870 mi, 760 nmi)
- Service ceiling: 6,000 m (19,700 ft)
- Rate of climb: 5.00 m/s (984 ft/min)

== See also ==
- Aermacchi SF.260 (military trainer designed by Frati)
- PAC CT/4 (Pacific Aerospace Limited)
