= Sequoia 300 Sequoia =

300 Sequoia

General information
- Type: Two-seat utility and aerobatic aircraft
- National origin: United States
- Manufacturer: Sequoia Aircraft Corporation
- Designer: David Thurston
- Number built: 2

History
- First flight: 26 April 1992
- Developed from: Sequoia Falco

The Sequio 300 Sequoia is an American two-seat utility or aerobatic aircraft, designed by David Thurston for Sequoia Aircraft Corporation for sale as a kit or set of plans for homebuilding.

== Design and development ==
The Sequioa, derived from the smaller Frati designed F.8 Falco, is a low-wing cantilever monoplane with a retractable tricycle landing gear and powered by a 300 hp (224 kW) Textron Lycoming TIO-540-S1AD turbocharged piston engine, although it was designed to take any Lycoming engine between 235-300 hp (175-224 kW). It has an enclosed cockpit for two with side-by-side seating.

The design was originally proposed in the 1970s but the first prototype did not fly until 26 April 1992 and by 1993 the program was being offered for sale.

== Variants ==
Model 300 Sequoia
Side-by-side seating version.
Model 301 Sequoia
Proposed variant with tandem seating.
Model 302 Kodiak
A proposed four-seat variant with gull-wing doors.

== Specifications (Utility) ==
Data from

General characteristics

- Crew: 2
- Length: 25 ft 0 in (7.62 m)
- Wingspan: 30 ft 0 in (9.14 m)
- Height: 9 ft 6 in (2.90 m)
- Wing area: 130 sq ft (12.08 m^{2})
- Empty weight: 1,800 lb (816 kg)
- Gross weight: 2,800 lb (1,270 kg)
- Powerplant: 1 × Textron Lycoming TIO-540-S1AD turbocharged piston engine , 300 hp (224 kW)

Performance

- Maximum speed: 225 mph (362 km/h, 196 kn)
- Cruise speed: 213 mph (343 km/h, 185 kn)
- Stall speed: 86 mph (139 km/h, 75 kn)
- Range: 1,000 mi (1,609 km, 870 nmi)
- Service ceiling: 25,000 ft (7,620 m)
- Rate of climb: 2,180 ft/min (11 m/s)

== See also ==
Aircraft of comparable role, configuration, and era

- Sequoia Falco
