= SET XV =

Romanian fighter prototype

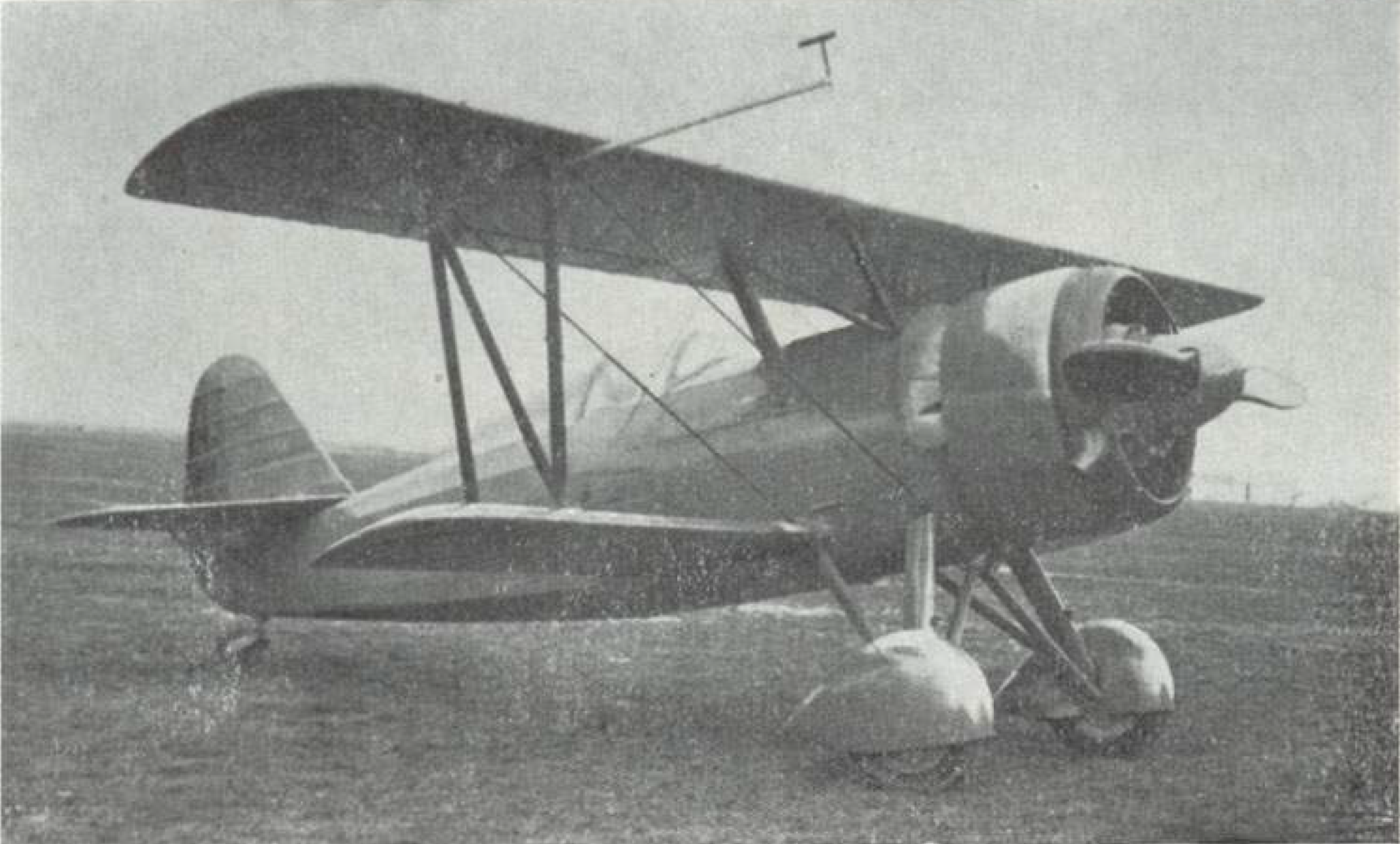

General information
- Type: Fighter
- Manufacturer: Societatea pentru exploatari technice (SET)
- Designer: Grigore Zamfirescu
- Number built: 1

History
- First flight: 1934

The SET XV was a fighter aircraft developed in Romania in the mid-1930s. It was a conventional single-bay biplane with staggered wings of unequal span braced by N-struts. It was fitted with fixed tailwheel undercarriage with spatted mainwheels. The cockpit was fully enclosed, and the engine was fitted with a NACA cowl. Construction throughout was fabric-covered metal.

The SET XV was developed to compete for a Romanian Air Force contract for a new fighter. However, before evaluation had even seriously begun, the Polish PZL P.11 was already selected as the winner amidst various claims of impropriety. The sole SET XV prototype was purchased by Ministerul Armatei and assigned to aerobatic training. It was retired from service in 1940, following an accident.

== Specifications (SET XV) ==
Data from Jane's all the World's Aircraft 1937, Romanian Aeronautical Constructions 1905–1974

General characteristics

- Crew: 1
- Length: 7 m (23 ft 0 in)
- Upper wingspan: 9.4 m (30 ft 10 in)
- Lower wingspan: 6.7 m (22 ft 0 in)
- Height: 3 m (9 ft 10 in)
- Wing area: 18.65 m^{2} (200.7 sq ft)
- Empty weight: 1,150 kg (2,535 lb)
- Gross weight: 1,550 kg (3,417 lb)
- Powerplant: 1 × IAR-built Gnome-Rhône 9Krsd 9-cylinder air-cooled radial piston engine, 370 kW (500 hp)
- Propellers: 2-bladed fixed-pitch wooden propeller

Performance

- Maximum speed: 286 km/h (178 mph, 154 kn) at sea level

340 km/h (210 mph; 180 kn) at 4,000 m (13,000 ft)
323 km/h (201 mph; 174 kn) at 6,000 m (20,000 ft)
298 km/h (185 mph; 161 kn) at 8,000 m (26,000 ft)

- Stall speed: 105 km/h (65 mph, 57 kn)
- Range: 520 km (320 mi, 280 nmi)
- Service ceiling: 9,400 m (30,800 ft)
- Time to altitude: 2,000 m (6,600 ft) in 2 minute 52 seconds; 4,000 m (13,000 ft) in 6 minute 28 seconds; 6,000 m (20,000 ft) in 11 minute 14 seconds
- Wing loading: 83.2 kg/m^{2} (17.0 lb/sq ft)
- Power/mass: 0.2410 kW/kg (0.1466 hp/lb)

Armament

- Guns: 2 fixed forward-firing synchronised 7.70 mm (.303 in) Vickers machine guns

Avionics
2-way radio
