= Servoplant Aerocraft =

Romanian ultralight aircraft

Aerocraft

General information
- Type: Ultralight aircraft
- National origin: Romania
- Manufacturer: Servoplant
- Status: In production (2015)

The Servoplant Aerocraft is a Romanian agricultural ultralight biplane, designed and produced by agricultural machinery manufacturer Servoplant, of Bucharest. The aircraft is supplied as a kit for amateur construction or as a complete ready-to-fly-aircraft.

== Design and development ==
The aircraft complies with the Fédération Aéronautique Internationale microlight rules. It features a strut-braced biplane layout, a two-seats-in-tandem open cockpit, fixed tricycle landing gear and a single engine in pusher configuration. The aircraft can also be fitted with floats for water operations.

The Aerocraft is made with a composite fuselage and aluminum wings. Its 8.75 m (28.7 ft) span wing has an area of 17.50 m^{2} (188.4 sq ft). The standard engine is the 104 hp (78 kW) Subaru EA81 automotive four-stroke powerplant.

== Operational history ==
In Romania the Aerocraft's popularity for agricultural aerial application is greater than that of the Antonov An-2.

== Specifications (Aerocraft) ==
Data from Bayerl and Tacke

General characteristics

- Crew: one
- Capacity: one passenger
- Wingspan: 8.75 m (28 ft 8 in)
- Wing area: 17.50 m^{2} (188.4 sq ft)
- Empty weight: 275 kg (606 lb)
- Gross weight: 450 kg (992 lb) or as high as 540 kg (1,190 lb), depending on engine fitted
- Fuel capacity: 55 litres (12 imp gal; 15 US gal)
- Powerplant: 1 × Subaru EA81 four cylinder, air-cooled, four stroke automotive engine, 78 kW (104 hp)
- Propellers: 6-bladed composite

Performance

- Maximum speed: 145 km/h (90 mph, 78 kn)
- Cruise speed: 95 km/h (59 mph, 51 kn)
- Stall speed: 65 km/h (40 mph, 35 kn)
- Rate of climb: 4.5 m/s (890 ft/min)
- Wing loading: 30.9 kg/m^{2} (6.3 lb/sq ft) at a gross weight of 540 kg (1,190 lb)
