= Schlitters =

- Municipality
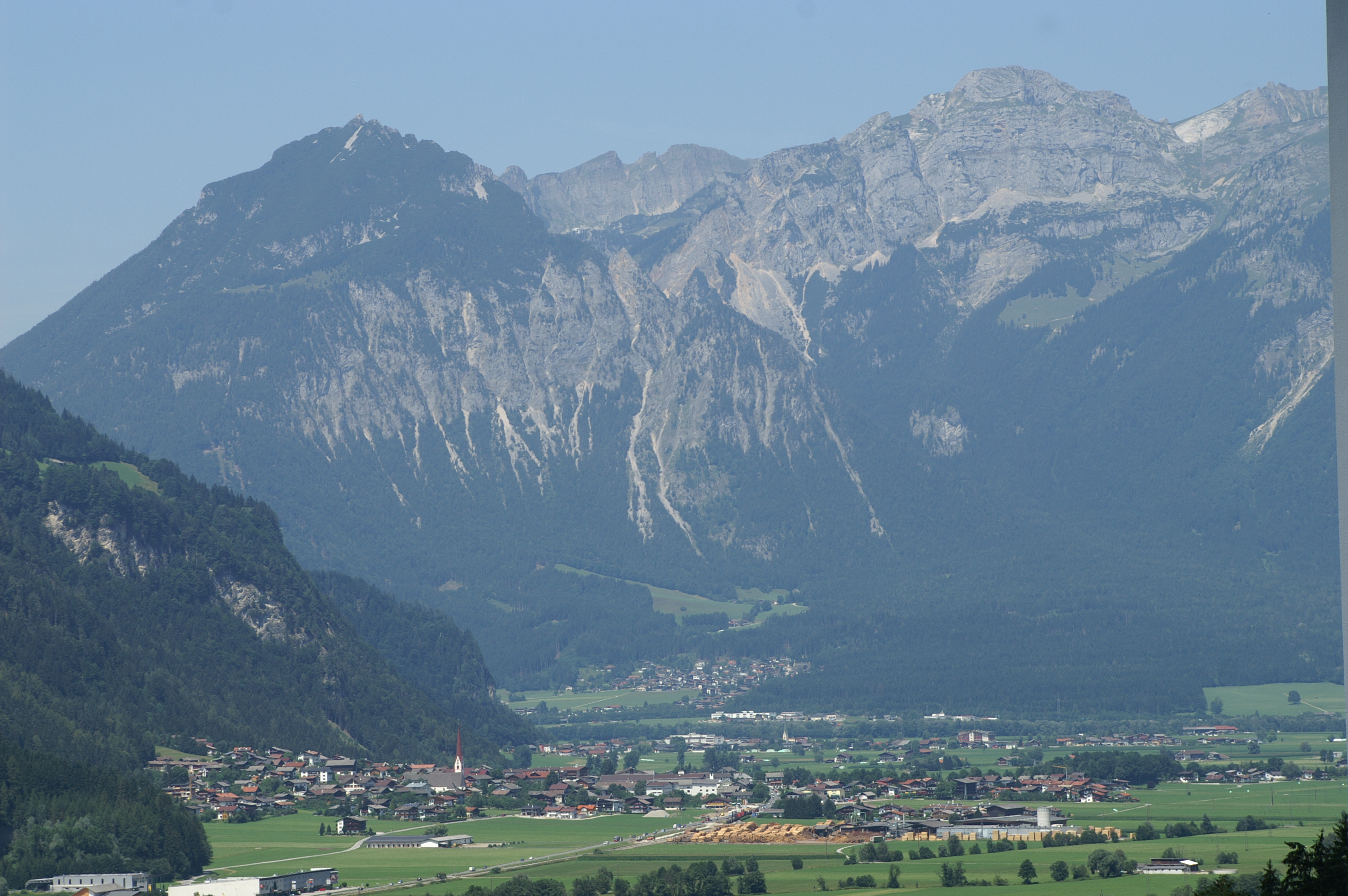

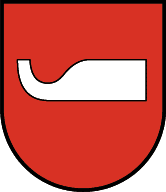
- Coat of arms

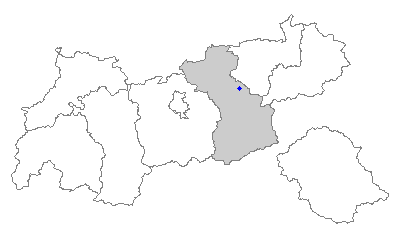
- Location within Tyrol

- Location within Austria
- Coordinates: 47°22′00″N 11°49′00″E
- Country: Austria
- State: Tyrol
- District: Schwaz

Government
  - Mayor: Friedl Abendstein

Area
  - Total: 10.36 km^{2} (4.00 sq mi)
- Elevation: 548 m (1,798 ft)

Population (2018-01-01)
  - Total: 1,481
  - Density: 143.0/km^{2} (370.2/sq mi)
- Time zone: UTC+1 (CET)
  - Summer (DST): UTC+2 (CEST)
- Postal code: 6262
- Area code: 05288
- Vehicle registration: SZ
- Website: http://www.schlitters.at/

Schlitters is a municipality in the Schwaz district in the Austrian state of Tyrol.

Schlitters lies in the Ziller Valley. The lake Schlitterer See is located in the municipality.
