= Sea-Bow International =

Canadian powered parachute manufacturer

- Company type: Private company
- Industry: Aerospace
- Founded: 2000
- Fate: Out of business (2015)
- Headquarters: Valcourt, Quebec, Canada
- Key people: Gerald Racicot
- Products: Powered parachutes

Sea-Bow International was a Canadian aircraft manufacturer, based in Valcourt, Quebec. The company was founded by designer Gerald Racicot and specialized in the design and production of powered parachutes. The company was originally called Valmecot, Inc.

The company was founded about 2000 and went out of business in 2015.

The company produced just one aircraft design, the Sea-Bow powered parachute.

== Aircraft ==
Summary of aircraft built by Sea-Bow International
Model name	First flight	Number built	Type
Sea-Bow International Sea-Bow			Powered parachute
