= List of aircraft (Cd–Cn) =

This is a list of aircraft in alphabetical order beginning with 'Cd' through to 'Cn'.

== Cd–Cn ==
=== CD ===
(Rogers Construction Co, Gloucester, NJ)

- CD Air Express

=== CEA ===
(Centre-Est Aéronautique)

- CEA DR.1050
- CEA DR.1051 Sicile Record
- CEA DR.1052 Excellence
- CEA DR.220
- CEA DR.221 Dauphin
- CEA DR.250 Capitaine
- CEA DR.253 Regent
- CEA DR.315 Petit Prince
- CEA DR.340 Major
- CEA DR.360 Chevalier
- CEA DR.380 Prince

=== CEI ===
(Auburn, CA)

- CEI Free Spirit Mk II

=== Celair ===
- Celair Eagle 300
- Celair GA-1 Celstar

=== Celier Aviation ===
(Piotrków Trybunalski, Poland / Safi, Malta)

- Celier Kiss
- Celier Xenon 2
- Celier Xenon 3
- Celier Xenon 4
- Celier Xenon IV
- Celier Xenon XL
- Celier XeWing

=== Centrair ===
- Centrair C101 Pegase
- Centrair C201 Marianne
- Centrair SCN 34 Alliance

=== Central ===
(Central Aircraft Company, Mahaska, KS)

- Central 1927 monoplane

=== Central ===
(Central Aircraft Company Limited)

- Central CF.2a
- Central CF.4
- Central CF.5
- Central Centaur IIA
- Central Centaur IV
- Sayers S.C.W.

=== Central States ===
(1926:Central States Aero Co Inc, Wallace Field, Bettendorf, IA, 1927:Renamed Central States Aircraft Co. 1928:Reorganized as Mono Aircraft Co, Moline, IL)

- Central States Monocoupe 22

=== Central Washington ===
(Central Washington Air Service, Wenatchee, WA)

- Central Washington 1931 monoplane

=== Century ===
(Century Aircraft Co, Kansas City, MO)

- Century SMB-4 (Beal Centurion)

=== Century ===
(Century Aerospace Corporation, Albuquerque, NM)

- Century CA-100 Century Jet

=== Century ===
(Century Aircraft Corp, 715 W 22 St, Chicago, IL)

- Century Amphibian Monoplane (aka Sea Devil)

=== Cercle Aéronautique de SGAC ===
(Cercle Aéronautique de SGAC)

- SGAC Marabout

=== CERVA ===
(Consortium Europeén de Réalisation et de Ventes d'Avions)

- CERVA CE.43 Guépard
- CERVA CE.44 Couguar
- CERVA CE.45 Léopard

=== Cessna ===
(Cessna Aircraft Co (Fdr: Clyde Cessna), Wichita, KS, 1992: Acquired by Textron Inc, Providence, RI)

- Cessna A-37 Dragonfly
- Cessna AT-8
- Cessna AT-17
- Cessna C-16
- Cessna C-28A
- Cessna C-35
- Cessna C-77
- Cessna C-78 Bobcat
- Cessna C-94
- Cessna C-106
- Cessna C-126
- Cessna C-172
- Cessna H-41 Seneca
- Cessna JRC
- Cessna L-19
- Cessna L-27
- Cessna O-1 Bird Dog
- Cessna O-2 Skymaster
- Cessna OE
- Cessna T-37
- Cessna T-41 Mescalero
- Cessna U-3 Blue Canoe
- Cessna U-17
- Cessna U-20
- Cessna 1911 Monoplane "Silver Wings"
- Cessna 1914 Monoplane
- Cessna 1916 Monoplane
- Cessna 120
- Cessna 140
- Cessna 150 Aerobat
- Cessna 152 Trainer/Commuter/Aerobat
- Cessna 160
- Cessna 162 Skycatcher
- Cessna 165 Airmaster
- Cessna 170
- Cessna 172 Skyhawk/Hawk XP/Cutlass/Cutlass RG/Powermatic/Skyhawk Powermatic etc. etc.
- Cessna 175 Skylark/Skyhawk
- Cessna 177 Cardinal/Cardinal RG/Classic
- Cessna 180 Skywagon
- Cessna 182 Skylane/deLuxe/Super Skylane
- Cessna 185 Skywagon/AGwagon/CarryAll
- Cessna 187
- Cessna 188 AGwagon/AGpickup/AGtruck/AGhusky
- Cessna 190 Businessliner
- Cessna 195 Businessliner
- Cessna 205 Skywagon
- Cessna 206 Super Skylane/Stationair/Super Cargo Master/Turbo Stationair
- Cessna 207 Skywagon
- Cessna 208 Caravan I/Grand Caravan/Cargomaster/Soloy Pathfinder
- Cessna 210 Centurion
- Cessna 303 Clipper
- Cessna T303 Crusader
- Cessna 305 O-1 Bird Dog
- Cessna 308
- Cessna 309
- Cessna 310
- Cessna 318 T-37
- Cessna 319 USNRL BLC experiments
- Cessna 320 SkyKnight/Executive Skyknight
- Cessna 321 OE
- Cessna 325 L-19 modified crop-sprayer
- Cessna 327
- Cessna 335
- Cessna 336 Skymaster
- Cessna 337 Skymaster/Super Skymaster
- Cessna 339 Super Skymaster
- Cessna 340
- Cessna 350 formerly the Columbia 350
- Cessna 400 formerly the Columbia 400
- Cessna 401
- Cessna 402 Businessliner/Utililiner/Utilitwin
- Cessna 404 Titan/Ambassador/Courier/Freighter
- Cessna 405
- Cessna 406 ???
- Cessna 407
- Cessna 408 SkyCourier
- Cessna 411
- Cessna 414
- Cessna 421 Executive Commuter/Golden Eagle
- Cessna 425 Corsair/Conquest I
- Cessna 441 Conquest I/II
- Cessna 500 Citation
- Cessna 501 Citation
- Cessna 525 Citation Jet
- Cessna 526 JPATS Citation Jet
- Cessna 550 Citation II/Citation SII/Citation Bravo
- Cessna 551 Citation S/IISP
- Cessna 560 Citation V/Citation Ultra/Citation Excel
- Cessna 561 Citation Excel
- Cessna 620
- Cessna 650 Citation III/VI/VII
- Cessna 670 Citation IV
- Cessna Citation Latitude
- Cessna 680 Citation Sovereign
- Cessna 750 Citation X
- Cessna 1014 XMC initial config.
- Cessna 1034 XMC later config.
- Cessna A
- Cessna AA
- Cessna AC
- Cessna AF Special
- Cessna AS
- Cessna AW
- Cessna A Racer
- Cessna BW
- Cessna C-3
- Cessna C-34
- Cessna C-37
- Cessna C-38 Airmaster
- Cessna C-145 Airmaster
- Cessna C-165 Airmaster
- Cessna Caravan
- Cessna CG-2
- Cessna Citation Family page with links to various sub-models
- Cessna Clipper
- Cessna CM-1
- Cessna CO-119 Bird Dog Italian Army
- Cessna Comet
- Cessna Conquest
- Cessna Corsair
- Cessna CPG-1
- Cessna CPW-6
- Cessna CR-1
- Cessna CR-2
- Cessna CR-3
- Cessna Crane
- Cessna CW-6
- Cessna DC-6
- Cessna EC-1 Baby Cessna
- Cessna EC-2 Baby Cessna
- Cessna FC-1
- Cessna GC-1
- Cessna GC-2
- Cessna LSA Sport
- Cessna P-7
- Cessna P-10
- Cessna P-260
- Cessna P-780
- Cessna T-50 Bobcat Company designation
- Cessna TTx
- Cessna X210
- Cessna XMC
- Cessna-General Motors Special
- Cessna CIRPAS Pelican

=== CFM Air ===
(Ciriè, Italy)

- CFM Air Dardo

=== CGS Aviation ===
(CGS Aviation, Inc., Grand Bay, AL)

- CGS Hawk Classic
- CGS Hawk Arrow
- CGS Hawk Plus
- CGS Hawk Sport
- CGS Hawk Ultra
- CGS AG-Hawk
- CGS Hawk Classic II
- CGS Hawk Arrow II

=== Chaboud ===
(Claude Chaboud)

- Chaboud CJC.01

=== Chadwick ===
- Chadwick C-122

=== Chagnès ===
(Léo Chagnès)

- Chagnes Microstar
- Chagnès CB.10

=== Chaika ===
(Chaika (Seagull Experimental Design Bureau), Samara)

- Chaika L-3
- Chaika L-4
- Chaika L-42
- Chaika L-42M
- Chaika L-44
- Chaika L-6 (Aero-Volga L-6)

=== Chalard ===
(Jacques et Renée Chalard)

- Chalard JRC-01 Julcar

=== Challis ===
(Hosea James Challis, Rensselaer, IN)

- Challis Parasol

=== Chamberlin ===
(1929: (Clarence D) Chamberlin Aeronautical Corp, Jersey City, NJ, 1930: Crescent Aircraft Corp Aircraft Corp (Pres: C D Chamberlin), 372 Lembeck Ave, Jersey City, NJ, 1930: Bankruptcy. 1939: Reorganization.)

- Chamberlin 2-S
- Chamberlin Cadet
- Chamberlin Pursuit Trainer
- Chamberlin A
- Chamberlin 2-S
- Chamberlin C-2 Trainer
- Chamberlin 2-S
- Chamberlin C-5 Super Sport
- Chamberlin C-5A Pursuit Trainer
- Chamberlin C-82
- Chamberlin Puddle Jumper
- Crescent Transport

=== Chambers ===
(A A Chambers, Hornell, NY)

- Chambers High-wing

=== Chambers ===
(Russell Chambers, Pomona, CA)

- Chambers R-1
- Chambers Trainer

=== Chambon Koenig ===
- Chambon Koenig CK.01 Profil

=== Chamoy ===
(M. Fernand Chamoy)

- Chamoy monoplane trainer

=== Champion ===
(Champion Airplane Co (Lester F Bishop), Chicago, IL)

- Champion 1915 Biplane

=== Champion ===
(Champion Aircraft Corp.)

- Champion 402 Lancer
- Champion 7EC Traveler
- Champion 7ECA Citabria
- Champion 7FC Tri-Traveler
- Champion 7GC Sky-Trac
- Champion 7GCAA Citabria
- Champion 7GCB
- Champion 7GCBA Challenger
- Champion 7GCBC Citabria
- Champion 7HC DX'er
- Champion 7JC Tri-Con
- Champion 7KCA
- Champion 7KCAB Citabria
- Champion 8GCBC Scout
- Champion 8KCAB Citabria Pro
- Champion Olympia

=== Champion ===
(Champion Aircraft Co (unrelated to the previous))

- Champion Citabria
- Champion Citabria 150S
- Champion Scout

=== Chance Vought ===
(see List of aircraft (V)#Vought)

=== Chandelle ===
(Chandelle Aircraft)

- Chandelle Mk IV

=== Changhe ===
(Changhe Aircraft Industries Corporation)

- Changhe CA109
- Changhe Z-8 Chinese-built SA 321
- Changhe Z-10
- Changhe Z-11
- Changhe Z-18

=== Chanute ===
(Octave Chanute, United States)

- Chanute Multiplane

=== Chanonhouse ===
(Fred C Chanonhouse, Squantum, MA)

- Chanonhouse Stevens

=== Chaparral ===
(Chaparral Motors, Polmar Lake, CO)

- Chaparral 2T-1A

=== Chapeau & Blanchet ===
- Chapeau & Blanchet JC-1 Levrier
- Chapeau & Blanchet JC-
- Chapeau & Blanchet CB.10

=== Charette Executive Vertiplane ===
- Charette Executive Vertiplane

=== Charles ===
((Ralph) Charles Airplane & Motor Co, 140 S 5th St, Zanesville, OH)

- Charles A
- Charles E-1
- Charles Flivver
- Charles MA-1

=== Charles ===
(P D Charles, Gettysburg, PA)

- Charles R-1

=== Charliss-Wendling ===
- Charliss-Wendling 1910 aeroplane

=== Charpentier ===
(Jean Charpentier )

- Charpentier C-1

=== Chase ===
(Chase Aircraft Company)

- Chase MS.1 (XCG-14)
- Chase MS.7 (Company designation for the XCG-14B)
- Chase MS.8 Avitruc
- Chase XCG-14 (First prototype, all-wooden.)
- Chase XCG-14A (Wood and metal version of XCG-14.) 24 seats.
- Chase YCG-14A (Production prototype version of XCG-14A, superseded by XCG-14B.)
- Chase YG-14A
- Chase XCG-14B
- Chase CG-18
- Chase G-18
- Chase CG-20
- Chase G-20
- Chase YC-122 Avitruc
- Chase XC-123
- Chase XC-123A

=== Chase-Gouverneur ===
(H M Chase & M F H Gouverneur, Wilmington, NC)

- Chase-Gouverneur 1910 multiplane

=== Chasle ===
(Yves Chasle)

- Chasle LMC-1 Sprintair
- Chasle YC-10 Migrateur
- Chasle YC-12 Tourbillon
- Chasle YC-15
- Chasle YC-20 Raz de Mareé
- Chasle YC-100 Hirondelle
- Chasle YC-101
- Chasle YC-110
- Chasle YC-111
- Chasle YC-120
- Chasle YC-320

=== Châtelain ===
(Armand Châtelain)

- Châtelain AC.5 Bijou
- Châtelain AC.7
- Châtelain AC.9
- Châtelain AC.10
- Châtelain AC.11
- Châtelain AC.12
- Châtelain-Crépin
- Châtelain 2000

=== Chauvet ===
(C.H. Chauvet)

- Chauvet 1933 flying wing

=== Chauvière ===
(Lucien Chauvière & Sylvio de Penteado)

- Chauvière-de Penteado 1909 Biplane
- Chauvière 1909 Monoplane
- Chauvière Gyroptere

=== Chayair ===
(Chayair Manufacturing and Aviation, Musina, South Africa)

- Chayair Sycamore Mk 1
- Chayair Sycamore Mk 2000

=== Cheney (aircraft constructor) ===
- Cheney 1

=== CAC ===
(Chengdu Aircraft Corporation)

- Chengdu CA-1
- Chengdu F-7
- Chengdu FC-1 Xiaolong
- Chengdu GJ-1
- Chengdu GJ-2
- Chengdu J-7
- Chengdu JZ-7
- Chengdu J-9
- Chengdu J-10
- Chengdu J-20
- Chengdu J-36
- Chengdu JJ-5
- Chengdu JF-17 Thunder
- Chengdu WZ-10
- Chengdu X-7 Jian Fan

=== Chengdu ===
(Chengdu Aircraft Corp.) see CAC

=== Cheranovsky ===
- Chyeranovsky BICh-3
- Chyeranovskii BICh-5
- Chyeranovskii BICh-7
- Chyeranovskii BICh-11
- Chyeranovskii BICh-14
- Chyeranovskii BICh-16
- Chyeranovskii BICh-18
- Chyeranovskii BICh-20
- Chyeranovskii BICh-21
- Chyeranovskii BICh-26

=== Chernov ===
(Boris Chernov & E.Yungerov / Gidroplan LLC / Gidrosamolet LCC)

- ChernoV Che-10
- Chernov Che-15
- Chernov Che-20
- Gidroplan Che-22 Korvet
- Chernov Che-23
- Gidrosamolet Che-24
- Chernov Che-25
- Gidrosamolet Che-26
- Chernov Che-27
- Gidrosamolet Che-28
- Gidrosamolet Che-29
- Chernov Che-30
- Chernov Che-35

=== Chester ===
(Milton A Chester, Bristol, PA)

- Chester K-L-A-C

=== Chester ===
(Art Chester, Chicago, IL, Air Racing Chester)

- Chester Jeep (aka Special #1)
- Chester Goon (aka Special #2)
- Chester Swee' Pea
- Chester Swee' Pea II
- Chester Wimpy

=== Chicago ===
(Chicago Aeroplane Mfg Co, Chicago, IL)

- Chicago 1911 biplane

=== Chicago ===
(Chicago Aero Works, 326 River St, Chicago, IL)

- Chicago Star Junior
- Chicago Star Junior Sport
- Chicago Star Tractor
- Chicago Star Military Tractor
- Chicago Speed Scout

=== Chicago ===
(Chicago Aviation Co/Chicago Aviation School, Chicago, IL)

- Chicago Viking 10-A

=== Chicago-Midwest ===
( Chicago-Midwest Aircraft Co, Dayton, OH)

- Chicago-Midwest X-101 (aka Dayton Overmount X)

=== Chichester-Miles ===
( Chichester-Miles Consultants / CMC)

- CMC Leopard

=== Chickasha ===
(Chickasha Aeroplane Co, Chickasha, OK)

- Chickasha 1911 aeroplane

=== Chilton ===
- Chilton D.W.1
- Chilton D.W.2

=== Chilleen-Fitton ===
(Simon Chilleen, Oak Park, IL, Fitton name or role unknown.)

- Chilleen-Fitton H-22 Special

=== Chincul ===
(Chincul S.A.C.A.I.F.I.)

- Chincul Cherokee Arrow Trainer
- Chincul Cherokee Pawnee Trainer

=== Chinese Republic ===
(Republic of China / Nationalist China)

- Chu CJC-3
- Xianyi Rosamonde (aka Dashatou Rosamonde)
- Foochow Ning Hae 2
- Naval Air Establishment Beeng
- Naval Air Establishment Ding
- Naval Air Establishment Chiang Ho (River Crane) floatplane
- Naval Air Establishment Chiang Feng (River Phoenix)
- Naval Air Establishment Chiang Hung (River Swan)
- Naval Air Establishment Chiang Gae'n
- Haunlong 19
- Fu-Shing AP-1
- Schoettler I Dulux Dashatou(Ferdinand Leopold Schoettler and Ernst Fuetterer – China)
- Schoettler III (Ferdinand Leopold Schoettler and Ernst Fuetterer – China)?
- Schoettler B3 (Ferdinand Leopold Schoettler and Ernst Fuetterer – China)
- Schoettler S4 (Ferdinand Leopold Schoettler and Ernst Fuetterer – China)
- Schoettler C5 (Ferdinand Leopold Schoettler and Ernst Fuetterer – China)
- Guangzhou No.51
- Guangzhou No.53
- Guangzhou No.54
- Guangzhou No.57
- Guangzhou No.58
- Guangzhou No.59
- Guangzhou No.74
- Huang Xiaoci trainer (黃孝慈)
- Type 3 trainer
- Glider Type 1
- Hsin-1 Ning Hai 2
- Liuchow Kwangsi Type 3
- Guiyang XP-1
- Guiyang XP-2
- Chung Yun-1
- Chung Yun-2
- Chu CJC-3(Major General C.J. Chu)
- Chu CJC-3A(Major General C.J. Chu)
- Chu Hummingbird A(Major General C.J. Chu)
- Chu Hummingbird B(Major General C.J. Chu)
- Chu XP-0(Major General C.J. Chu)
- Yench'u X-P1
- Chu D-2(Major General C.J. Chu)

=== Chinhae Naval Shipyard ===
- Chinhae Naval Shipyard flying-boat

=== Chipman ===
(Phil Chipman, Anaheim CA.)

- Chipman Challenge

=== Chiquet-Van Zandt ===
(L F Chiquet and H Van Zandt, White Plains, NY)

- Chiquet-Van Zandt Aerial turbine

=== Chmielewski ===
(Joseph Chmielewski, Cleveland, OH)

- Chmielewski 1A

=== Chodan ===
(Chodan first name unknown, Czechoslovakia and United States)

- Chodan Helicopter

=== Chotia ===
(Designer: John Chotia)

- Chotia Gypsy
- Chotia Weedhopper
- Chotia Woodhopper

=== CHRDI ===
(China Helicopter Research and Development Institute)

- CHRDI/CAE Z-7
- CHRDI Z-10
- CHRDI/Changhe WZ-10 (no relation to Z-10)

=== Chris Tena ===
(Chris Tena, Hillsboro, OR, 1978: Sport Air Craft Corp.)

- Chris Tena Mini CoupeL F Chiquet and H Van Zandt, White Plains, NY

=== Chrislea ===
- Chrislea L.C.1 Airguard
- Chrislea C.H.3 Series 1 Ace
- Chrislea C.H.3 Series 2 Super Ace
- Chrislea C.H.3 Series 3 Skyjeep
- Chrislea C.H.3 Series 4 Skyjeep

=== Christavia ===
(Elmwood Aviation, Belleville, Ontario, Canada)

- Christavia Mk.I
- Christavia Mk.II
- Christavia Mk.IV

=== Christen ===
(Christen Industries Inc (Fdr: Frank L Christensen), Hollister, CA, 1991: Acquired by Aviat Aircraft Inc, Afton, WY)

- Christen Eagle I
- Christen Eagle II
- Christen Husky

=== Christensen ===
(Harvey Christensen)

- Christensen 1948 monoplane

=== Christmas ===
(1910: (Dr William Whitney) Christmas Aeroplane Co, Washington, DC, c.1912: Durham Christmas Aeroplane Sales & Exhibition Co. 1918: Cantilever Aero Co, Copiague, NY)

- Christmas 1912 pusher biplane
- Christmas 1913 tractor biplane
- Christmas 1915 biplane
- Christmas Aerial Express
- Christmas Bullet
- Christmas Red Bird 1909 biplane
- Christmas Red Bird II 1910 biplane

=== Christofferson ===
((Harry & Silas) Christofferson Aeroplanes, Portland and Vancouver, WA)

- Christofferson 1912 biplane trainer
- Christofferson 1912 biplane
- Christofferson 1914 Tractor biplane
- Christofferson 1915 Tractor biplane
- Christofferson 1920 Pauling Edwards Amphibian
- Christofferson Model D
- Christofferson Looping biplane
- Christofferson Flying Bike
- Christofferson Flying Boat
- Christofferson Hydro

=== Christopher ===
- Christopher AG-1

=== Chrysler ===
(Chrysler Group, Detroit, MI)

- Chrysler VZ-6

=== Chu ===
(Major General C.J. Chu)

- Chu CJC-3
- Chu CJC-3A
- Chu Hummingbird A
- Chu Hummingbird B
- Chu XP-0
- Chu D-2

=== Chudzik ===
(Claude Chudzik)

- Chudzik CC.01

=== ChUR ===
(G.G. Chechet-M.K. Ushkov-N.V. Rebikov)

- ChUR No.1

=== Church ===
((James) Church Airplane & Mfg Co, Chicago, IL)

- Church Mid-Wing JC-1
- Church Low-wing

=== Church & Miller ===
(P W Church & F R Miller (as part of (Lee U) Eyerly Aircraft Corp), Salem, OR)

- Church & Miller Monoplane

=== Chyeranovskii ===
(Boris Ivanovich Cheranovsky, Soviet Union)

- Chyeranovskii BICh-1 Parabola
- Chyeranovskii BICh-2 Parabola (AVF-15)
- Chyeranovskii BICh-3
- Chyeranovskii BICh-5
- Chyeranovskii BICh-7
- Chyeranovskii BICh-7A
- Chyeranovskii BICh-8 Treugolnik
- Chyeranovskii BICh-9 Gnome
- Chyeranovskii BICh-10
- Chyeranovskii BICh-11 (Korolyev RP-1)
- Chyeranovskii BICh-12
- Chyeranovskii BICh-12 Parabola
- Chyeranovskii BICh-13
- Chyeranovskii BICh-13 Triangle
- Chyeranovskii BICh-14 (TsKB-10)
- Chyeranovskii BICh-16
- Chyeranovskii BICh-17 (see Kurchyevskii)
- Chyeranovskii BICh-18 Human-powered ornithopter also flown as a glider with wings locked
- Chyeranovskii BICh-20 Pionyer
- Chyeranovskii BICh-21
- Chyeranovskii BICh-22
- Chyeranovskii BICh-24
- Chyeranovskii BICh-25
- Chyeranovskii BICh-26
- Chyeranovskii SG-1

=== Chyetverikov ===
- Chyetverikov ARK-3
- Chyetverikov Chye-2
- Chyetverikov Gidro-1
- Chyetverikov MDR-3
- Chyetverikov MDR-6
- Chyetverikov MP-2
- Chyetverikov OSGA-101
- Chyetverikov SPL
- Chyetverikov TA
- Chyetverikov TA-1
- Chyetverikov TAF

=== CIAC ===
(CIAC - Corporacion de la Industria Aeronautica Colombiana SA)

- CIAC T-90 Calima

=== Cicaré ===
(Augusto Ulderico Cicaré / Cicaré Helicopteros S.A.)

- Cicaré CK.1 "Colibri"
- Cicaré CH-1
- Cicaré CH-2
- Cicaré CH-3
- Cicaré CH-4
- Cicaré CH-5 – AG
- Cicaré CH-6
- Cicaré CH-7
- Cicaré CH-7 2000 Angel
- Cicaré CH-8 2002 VL
- Cicaré CH-10C
- Cicaré CH-11C
- Cicaré CH-14 Aguilucho
- Cicaré SVH-3 (heli sim)
- Cicaré CH-2000
- Cicaré CH-2002

=== Cierva ===
(Juan de Cierva, Cierva Autogiro Company)

- Cierva C.1 Autogiro N°1
- Cierva C.2 Autogiro N°2
- Cierva C.3 Autogiro N°3
- Cierva C.4 Autogiro N°4
- Cierva C.5
- Cierva C.6A
- Cierva C.6C (Avro Type 574)
- Cierva C.6D (Avro Type 575)
- Cierva C.8
- Cierva C.9
- Cierva C.10
- Cierva C.12
- Cierva C.14
- Cierva C.17
- Cierva C.19
- Cierva C.20
- Cierva C.21
- Cierva C.24
- Cierva C.25
- Cierva C.29
- Cierva C.30
- Cierva C.33
- Cierva C.38
- Cierva C.40
- Cierva CR Twin
- Cierva W.5
- Cierva W.6
- Cierva W.9
- Cierva W.10 Air Horse?
- Cierva W.11 Air Horse
- Cierva W.14 Skeeter
- Cierva-Lepère CL.10

=== Cieslak ===
(Zane Cieslak, St Louis, MO and Normandy, MO)

- Cieslak C Little Pal

=== CIL ===
(Complexu Industrializare Lemnului – Reghin)

- CIL Reghin RG-7 Şoim – (Nowitchi)
- CIL Reghin RG-7 Şoim III – (Nowitchi)
- CIL Reghin RG-8 H1 Tintar – (Rado-Nowitchi)
- CIL Reghin RG-9 Albatros

=== Cincinnati ===
(Jungclass Automobile Co, Cincinnati, OH)

- Cincinnati 1910 Monoplane

=== Cinquanta ===
(Joe Cinquanta, Paradise, CA)

- Cinquanta Hornet
- Cinquanta D B Hawker II

=== Circa ===
(Circa Reproductions Inc (Pres: Michael Lee), Calgary, Alberta, Canada)

- Circa Nieuport 11
- Circa Nieuport 12
- Circa Nieuport 17
- Circa Morane-Saulnier N
- Circa Sopwith Baby
- Circa Sopwith Tabloid
- Circa Sopwith Triplane

=== Cirigliano ===
(Serafin Cirigliano, New Castle, DE & Farmingdale, NY)

- Cirigliano SC-1 Baby Hawk
- Smith-Cirigiliano SC-1

=== Cirrus ===
(Cirrus Aircraft (founders: Alan and Dale Klapmeier, Pres: Patrick Waddick, Todd Simmons), Duluth, MN and Knoxville, TN)

- Cirrus SR10 (TRAC10)
- Cirrus SRV
- Cirrus SR20 & SR20-G2/G3/G6/G7
- Cirrus SR22 & SR22-G2/G3/G5/G6/G7
- Cirrus SR22T & SR22T-G5/G6/G7
- Cirrus SR Sport (SRS)
- Cirrus ST50
- Cirrus Vision SF50 & Vision Jet-G2/G3
- Cirrus VK-30 (Viken-Klapmeier)

=== CITA ===
(Centro de Industria y Technologia Aeroespacial Bolivia)

- CITA Tiluchi
- CITA Gavilán

=== Citroën-Marchetti ===
(Citroën & Charles Marchetti)

- Citroën-Marchetti Re.1
- Citroën-Marchetti Re.2

=== Civil Aviation Department of India ===
(Ministry of Civil Aviation (India) – Civil Aviation Department)

- Civil Aviation Department ATS-1 Ardhra
- Civil Aviation Department HS-1
- Civil Aviation Department HS-2 Mrigasheer
- Civil Aviation Department ITG-3
- Civil Aviation Department KS-II Kartik
- Civil Aviation Department MG-1
- Civil Aviation Department Revathi
- Civil Aviation Department RG-1 Rohini
- Civil Aviation Department TS-2 Ashvini
- Civil Aviation Department TS-4 Ashvini II
- Civil Aviation Department LT-1 Swati

=== Civilian ===
(Civilian Aircraft Company)

- Civilian Coupé

=== ČKD-Praga ===
(see Praga)

=== Clairco ===
(David Saunders / Cheetah Light Aircraft Company Ltd. / Clairco)

- Clairco Cheetah
- Clairco Super Cheetah

=== Clark ===
(James W Clark, Bridgewater, PA)

- Clark 1900 Ornithopter

=== Clark ===
(Earl H & Donald Clark, Buffalo, NY)

- Clark M-1

=== Clark ===
(Clark Airplane Co (founders: Richard D Clark, Charles D Reed), Ponca City, OK)

- Clark 1930 aeroplane

=== Clark ===
((Virginius E) Clark Aurcraft Corp.)

- Clark 46 Duramold

=== Clark ===
(Clark Aircraft Inc, Marshall, TX)

- Clark 12
- Clark 1000C

=== Clark & Wood ===
(Jesse O Clark & Delmar E Wood, 807 W Noble Ave, Visalia, CA)

- Clark & Wood RKM-1

=== Clark-Fitzwilliams ===
- Clark-Fitzwilliams Cycloplane

=== Clarke ===
(J Clarke, Chicago, IL)

- Clarke 1909 biplane

=== Classic ===
(Classic Aircraft Co, Lansing MI, aka Classic Aero Enterprises.)

- Classic F5 (replica Waco F-5)
- Classic YMF Super (replica Waco YMF)
- Classic HJ-2 Honey Bee
- Classic H-3 pegasus
- Classic HP-40 Warhawk

=== Classic Fighter Industries ===
- Classic Fighter Industries Me 262 Project

=== Clavé ===
(Robert Clavé)

- Clavé le Goëland

=== Claxton High School ===
- Claxton High School Lil' Rascal

=== Cleary ===
((W) Cleary Aircraft Corp)

- Cleary CL-1 Zipper

=== Clem ===
(John Wesley Clem, Kansas City, KS)

- Clem Gold Bug

=== Clement ===
(Louis Clement)

- Clement Triplane
- Clement racing monoplane
- Clement-Moineau Monoplane Racer

=== Clément-Bayard ===
(Gustave Adolphe Clément-Bayard)

- Clément-Bayard No.1
- Clément-Bayard No.2
- Clément-Bayard No.3
- Clément-Bayard No.4
- Clément-Bayard No.5
- Clément-Bayard No.6
- Clément-Bayard 1909 (Demoiselle project - cf Santos-Dumont)
- Clément-Bayard 1910 triplane
- Clément-Bayard 1911 monoplane
- Clément-Bayard 1911 biplane
- Clément-Bayard 1912 biplane
- Clément-Bayard 1912 monoplane
- Clément-Bayard 1913 monoplane
- Clément-Bayard 1913 flying boat
- Clément-Bayard Military monoplane
- Clément-Bayard Military biplane
- Clément-Bayard bomber 1915/16

=== Clemson ===
(Aero Club, Clemson College, SC)

- Clemson Special

=== Cleone ===
(Cleone Motors Co, St Louis, MO)

- Cleone 5-M Paraquet
- Cleone 7-M

=== Clifton Brothers ===
- Clifton Trio

=== Clinger ===
(W R Clinger, Grandville, MI)

- Clinger CL-1

=== Cloquet ===
(Cloquet Mfg Co dba Trainer Aircraft Co Inc (founders: Norman Nelson, Claude Phillips, "Rosie" Rosenthal), Cloquet, MN)

- Cloquet 1931 Monoplane

=== Cloudbaser Trikes ===
- Cloudbaser Trikes Cloudbaser

=== Cloud-Coupe ===
(Cloud Aircraft Co. Cloud-Coupe Aircraft & Motors Corp Inc, Milan, IN)

- Cloud-Coupe A-1
- Cloud-Coupe Cub
- Cloud-Coupe EXP-1
- Cloud-Coupe LW
- Cloud-Coupe M-P
- Cloud-Coupe SQ-2

=== Cloudbuster Ultralights ===
- Cloudbuster Ultralights Cloudbuster

=== Cloudcraft Glider Company ===
- Cloudcraft Dickson Primary
- Cloudcraft Junior
- Cloudcraft Phantom

=== Cloud Dancer ===
(Cloud Dancer Aeroplane Works, Columbus, OH)

- Cloud Dancer Jenny Sport

=== Clouser ===
(Robert W Clouser, Ontario, CA)

- Clouser CG-1 Gnat

=== Club ULM Rotor ===
(Kumertau, Bashkortostan, Russia)

- Club ULM Rotor Ptenets-2

=== Clutton ===
- Clutton-Tabenor FRED
- Clutton-Tabenor E.C.2 Easy Too

=== CMASA ===
(Construzioni Mecchaniche Aeronautiche SA)

- CMASA MF.4
- CMASA MF.5
- CMASA MF.6
- CMASA MF.10
- CMASA G.8
- CMASA CS.15

=== C.N.A. ===
(Compagnia Nazionale Aeronautica)

- C.N.A. Beta
- C.N.A. Delta
- C.N.A. Eta
- C.N.A. Teta
- C.N.A. Merah
- C.N.A. 15
- C.N.A. 25
- C.N.A. PM.1

=== CNIAR ===
(Centrul National al Industriei Aeronautice Románe)

- CNIAR IAR-93 Vultur

=== CNNA ===
(Companhia Nacional de Navegação Aérea / HL = Henrique Lage)

- CNNA HL-1
- CNNA HL-2
- CNNA HL-3
- CNNA HL-4
- CNNA HL-5
- CNNA HL-6
- CNNA HL-8
- CNNA HL-14

=== CNNC ===
(Cia Nacional de Navegação Costeira)

- Lafay Independência
