= Chyeranovskii BICh-5 =

BICh-5

General information
- Type: Bomber
- National origin: USSR
- Manufacturer: Chyeranovskii
- Designer: Boris Ivanovich Chyeranovskii

The BICh-5 was a tailless bomber aircraft designed in the USSR from 1928.

== Development ==
After the relative success of Chyeranovskii's first tailless gliders and powered aircraft, the BICh-1 and BICh-2 and BICh-3, he continued the tailless theme with the BICh-5 bomber. The BICh-5 was to have been a twin-engined tailless aircraft with a retractable undercarriage, two BMW VI engines and multi segment convex elevons suspended below the trailing edge of the wing. Wind tunnel testing was carried out with a model during 1928 but further work was abandoned in 1929.

General characteristics

- Empty weight: 140 kg (309 lb)
- Gross weight: 230 kg (507 lb)
- Powerplant: × Blackburne Tomtit

Performance

== See also ==
Related lists

- List of aircraft
