= Chyeranovskii BICh-14 =

Soviet sport/touring aircraft from 1934

BICh-14
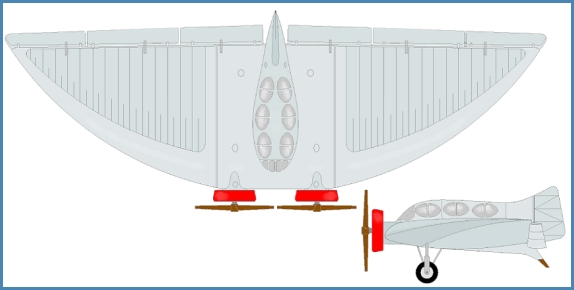

General information
- Type: Sport / Touring
- National origin: USSR
- Manufacturer: Chyeranovskii
- Designer: Boris Ivanovich Chyeranovskii
- Number built: 1

History
- First flight: late 1934

The BICh-14 (a.k.a. TsKB-10) was a twin-engined tailless sport / touring aircraft designed and built in the USSR from 1934.

== Development ==
Further development of the BICh-7A led to an enlarged twin-engined version, a model of which was tested in a wind tunnel, as the BICh-10, with two M-11 engines on the leading edge of the parabolic wing either side of the cockpit nacelle. Full scale development emerged as the BICh-14, a 2x scaled up BICh-7A, with Townend ring cowlings and up to five seats in the cabin. Construction was of wood with plywood and fabric skin or covering, four spars and sixty ribs.

Flight testing began late in 1934 piloted by Yu. I. Piontkovskii, and later in 1936 at the NII VVS by P.M. Stefanovskii, M.A. Nyukhtikov and I.F. Petrov. Results of the flight tests were not encouraging as the aircraft was found to have marginal control and stability, with high stick forces required to raise the nose on landing, as well as an in-effective rudder. Despite the shortcomings of the BICh-14 testing continued through to 1937.

== Variants ==
- BICh-10 – initial twin-engined version tested in a wind tunnel, in 1933, as a model only.
- BICh-14 – A 2x scaled up BICh-7A with two M-11 radial engines on the leading edges of the wings.

== Specifications (BICh-14) ==
Data from Gunston, Bill. “The Osprey Encyclopaedia of Russian Aircraft 1875 – 1995”. London, Osprey. 1995. ISBN 1-85532-405-9

General characteristics

- Crew: 1
- Capacity: 4
- Length: 6.0 m (19 ft 9 in)
- Wingspan: 16.2 m (53 ft 2 in)
- Wing area: 60 m^{2} (646 sq ft)
- Empty weight: 1,285 kg (2,883 lb)
- Gross weight: 1,900 kg (4,189 lb)
- Powerplant: 2 × M-11 , 74.6 kW (100 hp) each

Performance

- Maximum speed: 220 km/h (137 mph, 119 kn)
- Range: 370 km (230 mi, 200 nmi)

== See also ==
Aircraft of comparable role, configuration, and era

- Horten H.V

Related lists

- List of aircraft
