= Chyeranovskii BICh-21 =

BICh-21
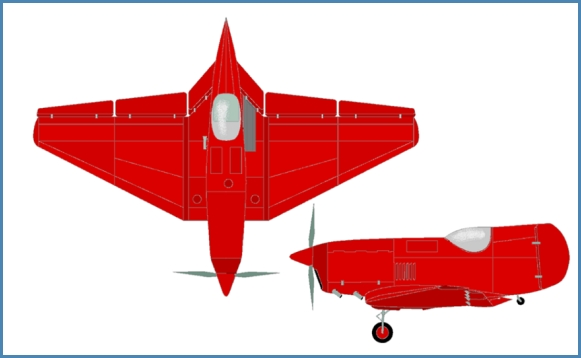

General information
- Type: Racing aircraft
- National origin: USSR
- Manufacturer: Chyeranovskii
- Designer: Boris Ivanovich Chyeranovskii
- Number built: 1

History
- First flight: June 1941

The BICh-21 (a.k.a. SG-1) (Samolyet Gonochnii – racing aeroplane) was a tail-less racing aircraft designed and built in the USSR from 1938.

== Development ==
To compete in the August 1941 Osoaviakhim all-union air race Chyeranovskii followed the successful recipe he used in the BICh-20, building the smallest possible aircraft to house the Renault 6 in-line MV-6 engine and the cockpit in the leading edge of the fin. The inverted gull wings allowed a shorter, pneumatically retracted tail-wheel undercarriage, to be fitted at the junction of the inner and outer wings. The aircraft was completed in 1940 but flight tests were not carried out till June 1941.

The BICh-21 was a firm favourite to win the all-union air race but Operation Barbarossa intervened, with the start of the Great Patriotic War, further work on the BICh-21 was stopped.

== Specifications (BICh-21) ==
Data from Gunston, Bill. “The Osprey Encyclopaedia of Russian Aircraft 1875 – 1995”. London, Osprey. 1995. ISBN 1-85532-405-9

General characteristics

- Crew: 1
- Length: 4.74 m (15 ft 7 in)
- Wingspan: 6.9 m (22 ft 8 in)
- Wing area: 9.0 m^{2} (97 sq ft)
- Empty weight: 526 kg (1,160 lb)
- Gross weight: 643 kg (1,418 lb)
- Powerplant: 1 × licence built Renault MV-6 , 200 kW (270 hp)

Performance

- Maximum speed: 417 km/h (259 mph, 225 kn) at 4,000 m (13,000 ft)

== See also ==
Related lists

- List of aircraft
