= Chyeranovskii BICh-18 =

Soviet man-powered ornithopter

BiCh-18 Muskulyot

General information
- Type: Man-powered Ornithopter
- National origin: Soviet Union
- Designer: Boris Ivanovich Cheranovsky
- Number built: 1

History
- First flight: 10 August 1937

The Chyeranovskii BICh-18 Muskulyot (or sometimes Cheranovsky BICh-18) is an experimental Soviet man-powered ornithopter designed and built by Boris Ivanovich Cheranovsky. The BiCH-18 was a lightweight wooden construction biplane with two pairs of high aspect ratio wings moved by muscle power. It was first flown in 1937 by R.A. Pischuchev as a glider with the wings locked and launched by cable. On the fourth test the wings were operated by the pedals and a glide of 430 m (470 yd) was achieved.

== Specifications ==
Data from Illustrated Encyclopedia of Aircraft

General characteristics

- Crew: 1
- Length: 4.48 m (14 ft 8 in)
- Wingspan: 8.00 m (26 ft 3 in)
- Wing area: 10.00 m^{2} (107.6 sq ft)
- Empty weight: 72 kg (159 lb)
- Max takeoff weight: 130 kg (287 lb)

== See also ==
Related lists

- List of human-powered aircraft
