= Chasle YC-100 Hirondelle =

French single seat microlight

YC-100 Hirondelle

General information
- Type: Single seat microlight
- National origin: France
- Manufacturer: from plans
- Designer: Yves Chasle

History
- First flight: 1 May 1985

The Chasle YC-100 Hirondelle (Swallow) is a French single seat microlight designed in the 1980s.

== Design and development ==
Yves Chasle worked as an Aérospatiale stress engineer and independently designed several light aircraft, starting with the Chasle YC-12 Tourbillon. His YC-100 Hirondelle is a largely wooden framed and fabric covered single-seat sports aircraft of conventional pusher layout. It has a strut braced high wing of constant chord with styrofoam ribs. The fuselage of the Hirondelle is a slender, rectangular cross-sectioned beam with the pilot's seat upon it ahead of the wing leading edge. Behind the pilot a central structure supports the wing just above head level; on its trailing edge, one of several types of small piston engine, with power outputs typically around 20 kW (27 hp), drives a pusher propeller. The fin is broad and straight-tapered and the horizontal tail is attached to the fuselage underside. The Hirondelle has a short, fixed tricycle undercarriage.

Its first flight was on 1 May 1985, powered by a 18 kW (24 hp) König SC 430 engine, a 430 cc (26.2 cu in), air-cooled, three-cylinder radial. The second prototype, built in Brazil, had a 16 kW (22 hp) JPX PUL 425/503 engine, a 212 cc (12.9 cu in) air-cooled flat-twin two stroke.

The number built is uncertain; in 2009 two examples, both YC-100s, appeared on European civil registers, one in Spain and one in France.

== Variants ==
Plans for these were available but only the YC-100 is known to have been built.

YC-100
As described below but could also be fitted with a 16 kW (22 hp) JPX PUL 425/503.
YC-101
As YC-100 but span increased to 9.35 m (30 ft 8 in). Recommended engines were the JPX PUL 865, the 21 kW (28 hp) König SD 570 or the 22 kW (30 hp) KFM 107ER.
YC-110
Shorter span (8.25 m (27 ft 1 in) wings with NACA 23015 section and Junkers type, two part, full span auxiliary airfoil ailerons or flaperons. Recommended engines as YC-100 and also the König SD 570.
YC-111
Longer span (9.35 m (30 ft 8 in)) YC-110. Recommended engines were the König SD 570, KFM 107ER, JPX PUL 865 and also the Rotax 377 or 447, respectively 26 kW (35 hp) and 29.4 kW (39.4 hp).

== Specifications (YC-100 prototype) ==
Data from Jane's All the World's Aircraft 1988/89

General characteristics

- Crew: one
- Length: 5.43 m (17 ft 10 in)
- Wingspan: 8.30 m (27 ft 3 in)
- Height: 1.71 m (5 ft 7 in)
- Wing area: 11.25 m^{2} (121.1 sq ft)
- Airfoil: 3.20.16Y (an Aérospatiale V.16F variant)
- Empty weight: 110 kg (243 lb)
- Max takeoff weight: 210 kg (463 lb)
- Fuel capacity: 24 L (6.3 US gal; 5.3 Imp gal)
- Powerplant: 1 × König SC 430 air-cooled three cylinder 430 cc (26.24 cu in) radial engine, 18 kW (24 hp)

Performance

- Maximum speed: 130 km/h (81 mph, 70 kn)
- Cruise speed: 100 km/h (62 mph, 54 kn)
- Stall speed: 45 km/h (28 mph, 24 kn)
- Take-off run, grass: less than 100 m (330 ft)
- Landing run, grass: about 27 m (90 ft)
