= Chyeranovskii BICh-16 =

BiCh-16

General information
- Type: Man-powered Ornithopter
- National origin: Soviet Union
- Designer: Boris Ivanovich Cheranovsky
- Number built: 1

History
- First flight: 1934

The Chyeranovskii BICh-16 (or sometimes Cheranovsky BICh-16) is an experimental Soviet man-powered ornithopter designed and built by Boris Ivanovich Cheranovsky. The BiCH-16 was a wooden construction tailless design with a braced skid landing gear and the wings moved by pedals. It was first flown by R.A. Pischuchev as a glider after launch by cable but it was unstable and re-built a number of times before being abandoned in 1938.

== Design ==
The BICh-16 glider ornithopter was designed as a "flying wing". The left and right wing are movable and connected by hinges. The outer ends of the wing spars are hinged to the spars of the propeller blades. The trailing edge of the wing has the elevator and ailerons. The centre of the structure has a landing-spring ski at the bottom and a small keel at the rear. To fly, the pilot stood upright on the ski, then strapped down with his hands in the controls. The wing flapping movements were performed by leg power by crouching and then straightening out. The Bich-16 was included in the 1934 plan of the Main Department of Aircraft Design, and it was produced at aircraft plant No.39 in December of that year.
