= Chyeranovskii BICh-26 =

Soviet jet fighter from 1947

BICh-26

General information
- Type: Jet Fighter
- National origin: USSR
- Manufacturer: Cheranovsky
- Designer: Boris Ivanovich Cheranovsky

The BICh-26 was a tailless jet fighter designed in the Soviet Union from 1947.

== Development ==
After the close of World War II, Boris Cheranovsky was running a de facto design bureau working on jet fighter aircraft. Not only was Cheranovsky involved with jet propulsion, he also studied variable geometry with the BICh-24 and BICh-25, which were designed with variable sweep wings pivoting outboard of the fuselage to help alleviate centre of pressure changes. Also envisaged was a stressed skin light alloy tailless jet fighter with powered flying controls and pressurised cockpit, designated BICh-26. Cheranovsky's failing health from 1948 prevented further progress on these projects.

== Variants ==
- BICh-24 – Variable sweep jet fighter project.
- BICh-25 – Variable sweep jet fighter project.
- BICh-26 – Tail-less jet fighter project.

== Specifications (BICh-26) ==
Data from Gunston, Bill. “The Osprey Encyclopaedia of Russian Aircraft 1875 – 1995”. London, Osprey. 1995. ISBN 1-85532-405-9

General characteristics

- Crew: 1
- Length: 9.0 m (29 ft 7 in)
- Wingspan: 7.0 m (23 ft 0 in)
- Wing area: 27 m^{2} (291 sq ft)
- Gross weight: 4,500 kg (9,920 lb)
- Powerplant: 1 × Mikulin AM-5 turbojet , 44.15 kN (9,920 lbf) thrust

Performance

- Maximum speed: Mach 1.7
- Service ceiling: 22,000 m (72,000 ft)

Alert: It should be clear to the reader that this aircraft does not exist, and has never existed. It was 'dreams on paper'.
