= Chyeranovskii BICh-11 =

Soviet research aircraft from 1931

BICh-11
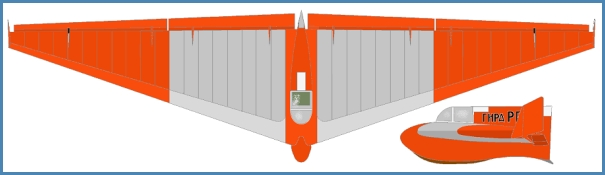

General information
- Type: Research
- National origin: USSR
- Manufacturer: Chyeranovskii
- Designer: Boris Ivanovich Chyeranovskii
- Number built: 1

History
- First flight: early 1932

The BICh-11 (a.k.a. RP-1) (Raketnyii Planer – rocket glider) was a twin-engined tailless research aircraft designed and built in the USSR from 1931.

== Development ==
The BICh-11 was the first purpose-designed rocket-powered aircraft in the world. It was planned to power the BICh-11 with two Tsander OR-2 liquid fuelled rocket engines; however it was never flown with the rocket engines as they had not been proven safe for use in crewed aircraft. Flight testing began early in 1932 as a bungee-launched glider with ski undercarriage. Later flight tests used an ABC Scorpion piston engine.

The 50 kg (110 lb) thrust Tsander OR-2 engines were to have been mounted either side of the central nacelle in small over-wing fairings, with large liquid-oxygen and gasoline tanks mounted forward of the engines' combustion chambers. The rocket engines were successfully bench run in 1933, but were never installed in the aircraft.

== Variants ==
- BICh-11 – Twin rocket powered tail-less aircraft
- RP-1 – Alternate designation for BICh-11

== Specifications (BICh-11 with ABC Scorpion) ==
Data from Gunston, Bill. “The Osprey Encyclopaedia of Russian Aircraft 1875–1995”. London, Osprey. 1995. ISBN 1-85532-405-9

General characteristics

- Crew: 1
- Length: 3.25 m (10 ft 8 in)
- Wingspan: 12.1 m (39 ft 8.5 in)
- Wing area: 20 m^{2} (215 sq ft)
- Powerplant: 1 × ABC Scorpion , 26 kW (35 hp)

Performance

== See also ==
Aircraft of comparable role, configuration, and era

- Horten H.II

Related lists

- List of aircraft
