= Chasle LMC-1 Sprintair =

LMC-1 Sprintair

General information
- Type: Two seat light aircraft
- National origin: France
- Manufacturer: Léon-Morane Club members
- Designer: Yves Chasle
- Number built: at least 3

History
- First flight: 18 June 1975

The Chasle LMC-1 Sprintair is an all-metal, single-seat sports light aircraft designed in France in the early 1970s and intended to be built by aero clubs from plans.

== Design and development ==
Yves Chasle worked as an Aérospatiale stress engineer and independently designed several light aircraft, starting with the Chasle YC-12 Tourbillon. Beginning in 1973 he designed the LMC-1 Sprintair, an all-metal, side-by-side two-seater. The first prototype was built by about twenty members of the Léon-Morane Club, hence the model initials. Most club members were SOCATA employees, based in Tarbes.

The Sprintair has a low, cantilever, unswept, constant-chord wing, mounted with 4° of dihedral and with square tips which have slightly rounded leading edges. Structurally, the wing is a torsion box with a single main spar at 30% chord and a lighter rear auxiliary spar. Almost the whole trailing edge is occupied by a control surface, the outer parts hinged as ailerons and the inner halves as three position flaps.

The fuselage is a metal semi-monocoque with a 75 kW (100 hp) Rolls-Royce Continental O-200-A air-cooled flat four aircraft engine in the nose, driving a two-blade propeller. The two seats are over the wing under a one-piece, forward-hinged canopy which extends ahead of the leading edge. There is a fixed rear transparency that drops down to the fuselage. At the rear, the tall vertical tail is straight-edged with sweep on both fin and rudder; overall sweep is 30°. The tailplane is mounted on top of the extreme rear fuselage and, together with the elevator, is rectangular apart from a projecting, cockpit-adjustable trim tab. Both the tailplane angle of incidence and a rudder trim tab are adjustable on the ground.

The Sprintair has fixed tricycle landing gear with main wheels on faired legs mounted on the lower fuselage and an unfaired, telescopic, sprung, steerable nosewheel.

== Operational history ==
The Léon-Morane built first prototype was first flown on 18 June 1975 and remained there until written off at Tarbes in 1984. At least two more, possibly three, were completed from plans provided by Chasle; one of them was still active at Toulouse in 2008.

== Operational history ==
Data from Jane's All the World's Aircraft 1976-1977

General characteristics

- Crew: One pilot
- Capacity: One passenger
- Length: 6.45 m (21 ft 2 in)
- Wingspan: 8.60 m (28 ft 3 in)
- Wing area: 10.00 m^{2} (107.6 sq ft)
- Aspect ratio: 7.5
- Airfoil: NACA 63A218
- Empty weight: 450 kg (992 lb)
- Max takeoff weight: 700 kg (1,543 lb)
- Fuel capacity: 105 L (23 imp gal; 28 US gal), mounted in wing root tanks
- Powerplant: 1 × Rolls-Royce Continental O-200-A air-cooled flat four, 75 kW (100 hp)
- Propellers: 2-bladed McCauley, 1.80 m (5 ft 11 in) diameter metal, fixed pitch

Performance

- Maximum speed: 215 km/h (134 mph, 116 kn) at sea level
- Cruise speed: 190 km/h (120 mph, 100 kn) maximum
- Stall speed: 80 km/h (50 mph, 43 kn) flaps down
- g limits: +9/-4.5
- Take-off run: 230 m (755 ft)
