= Chyeranovskii BICh-7 =

Soviet sport/touring aircraft from 1929

BICh-7
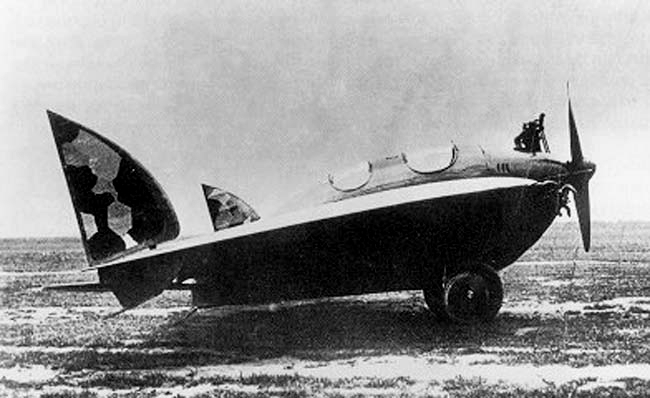

General information
- Type: Sport / Touring
- National origin: USSR
- Manufacturer: Chyeranovskii
- Designer: Boris Ivanovich Chyeranovskii
- Number built: 1

History
- First flight: 1929

The BICh-7 was a tailless sport/touring aircraft designed and built in the USSR from 1929.

== Development ==
Chyeranovskii designed an enlarged BICh-3, at approximately 1.5 scale, with tandem open cockpits, underslung elevons (à la Junkers) centreline mono-wheel, wing-tip rudders with skids with no tail. Flight testing commenced in 1929 but was soon halted due to the very poor handling characteristics which rendered the BICh-7 almost impossible to take off. The BICh-7 was completely rebuilt as the BICh-7A, modifications included: enclosed tandem cockpits, a conventional style tail-skid undercarriage, and a fin with rudder faired into the rear of the cockpit nacelle. Flight tests resumed, in 1932, with much improved handling other than excessive speed loss when turning and engine vibration. The speed loss was attributed to interference between the large elevons and the rudder and was alleviated by adding breaker strips to the elevons and setting them at a lower incidence.

== Variants ==
- BICh-7 – initial unsuccessful version with open cockpits wing-tip rudders and skids and centre-line mono-wheel.
- BICh-7A – Modified version with enclosed cockpits, fin and rudder and conventional style tail-skid undercarriage

== Specifications (BICh-7A) ==
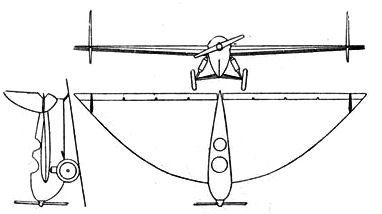
Chyeranovskii BICh-7 3-view drawing from L'Aerophile Salon 1932

Data from Gunston, Bill. "The Osprey Encyclopaedia of Russian Aircraft 1875 – 1995". London, Osprey. 1995. ISBN 1-85532-405-9

General characteristics

- Crew: 2
- Length: 4.95 m (16 ft 3 in)
- Wingspan: 12.5 m (41 ft 0 in)
- Wing area: 34.6 m^{2} (372 sq ft)
- Empty weight: 627 kg (1,382 lb)
- Gross weight: 880 kg (1,940 lb)
- Powerplant: 1 × Bristol Lucifer 3-cyl. Radial engine , 74.6 kW (100 hp)

Performance

- Maximum speed: 165 km/h (102.5 mph, 89.1 kn)
- Range: 350 km (217 mi, 189 nmi)

== See also ==
Aircraft of comparable role, configuration, and era

- Horten H.III

Related lists

- List of aircraft
