= Cloudcraft Phantom =

British single-seat glider, 1931

Phantom

General information
- Type: Single seat high performance sailplane
- National origin: United Kingdom
- Manufacturer: Cloudcraft Glider Co., Southampton
- Designer: Roger Dickson
- Number built: 1

History
- First flight: 11 June 1931

The Cloudcraft Phantom was a glider designed in the United Kingdom in 1931 to make long flights. It set an unofficial duration British record but vandalism prevented a cross-Channel attempt.

== Design and development ==
The Phantom was a single-seat, clean, high-performance glider designed for Mr Percy Michelson with distance records and a cross-channel flight in mind. It was an all-wood aircraft, built of spruce and plywood. The wing had a single spruce spar with stressed ply to the leading edge forming a torsion box. At the time, the choice of the biconvex R.A.F. 34 airfoil was unusual, the concave/convex Göttingen forms being generally used. The wing was high mounted on a long, shallow pylon just behind the open cockpit, braced with a single lift strut on each side.

Its tailplane was low mounted and the rudder rounded and generous, mounted on a narrow fin. It landed on a long skid reaching from the nose to well behind the wing trailing edge.

The Phantom first flew on 11 June 1931.

== Operational history ==
The Phantom gained its Certificate of Airworthiness in November 1931. Advertisements from July 1931 show that Cloudcraft hoped to sell the Phantom equipped as both Standard and Special models but the company closed for business at the end of 1931, so only was built.

One of the Phantom's earliest outings was to the glider demonstration at Bunster Hill, overlooking Ilam, Staffordshire, on 27–28 June 1931, one of the Lyons Tea meetings. Unfortunately, some of the ply became detached near the cockpit and no flights were made. The month after its maiden flight, the repaired Phantom demonstrated its intended long-duration ability by unofficially breaking the British glider duration record with a flight of over 4¼ hours. The pilot was "Mungo" Buxton. It was the first time that the time set by Maneyrol in the Peyret Tandem at the British Glider Competition nine years earlier had been bettered by a British pilot and aircraft in Britain.

Its owner, Michelson, intended to try for the Cellon prize for an unpowered cross-English Channel flight but the aircraft was seriously damaged by vandals on the cliffs near Dover. He could not afford to have it repaired and put it up for sale in 1932. The remains were bought by the Bradford and County Gliding Club in April 1933. It seems they wanted it for its instruments and launch rope, for the Phantom was too lightly built for club work. The remains ended up at the Slingsby Aviation works at Kirbymoorside; they were there in 1938 but may have been burned during World War II.

== Specifications ==
Data from Ellison

General characteristics

- Crew: 1
- Length: 25 ft 0 in (7.62 m)
- Wingspan: 51 ft 0 in (15.54 m)
- Wing area: 200 sq ft (19 m^{2})
- Aspect ratio: 13
- Airfoil: R.A.F. 34 modified
- Empty weight: 247 lb (112 kg)
- Gross weight: 407 lb (185 kg)

Performance

- Lift-to-drag: 26, maximum
