= CFM Air Dardo =

Italian ultralight aircraft

Dardo
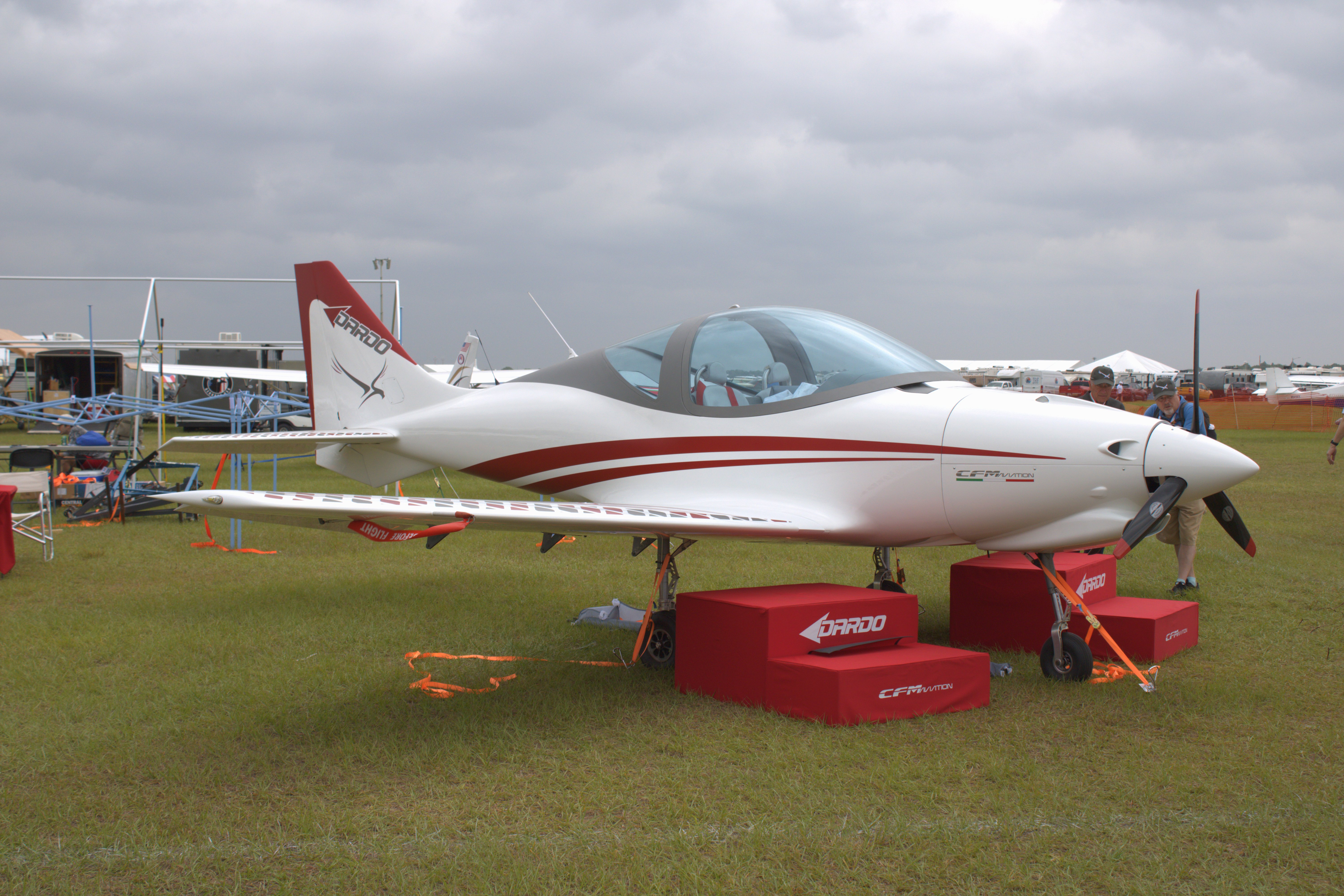

General information
- Type: Ultralight aircraft
- National origin: Italy
- Manufacturer: CFM Air
- Status: Ready for production (2015)

History
- Introduction date: 2014
- First flight: July 2014

The CFM Air Dardo (English: Dart) is an Italian ultralight aircraft that was designed by CFM Air of Cirié, introduced at the AERO Friedrichshafen show in 2014.

== Design and development ==
The Dardo was designed by CFM Air, a company usually noted for its contract aerospace development and prototyping of projects, with the intention of selling the design for production by another company. CFM Air has also not ruled out producing the aircraft itself, if needed.

The prototype was first flown in July 2014.

The Dardo features a cantilever low-wing, an enclosed cockpit with two-seats-in-side-by-side configuration under a bubble canopy, retractable tricycle landing gear and a single engine in tractor configuration.

The aircraft is made all composite materials. Its 8.4 m (27.6 ft) span wing has an area of 10.6 m^{2} (114 sq ft) and mounts flaps. Standard engines intended for use are the 100 hp (75 kW) Rotax 912ULS and the 150 hp (112 kW) MW-Fly four-stroke powerplants. In 2015 a hybrid electric aircraft version was shown in Paris.

The design features a very wide cockpit of 130 cm (51.2 in).

== Specifications (Dardo) ==
Data from Tacke

General characteristics

- Crew: one
- Capacity: one passenger
- Wing area: 10.6 m^{2} (114 sq ft)
- Empty weight: 320 kg (705 lb)
- Powerplant: 1 × Rotax 912ULS four cylinder, liquid and air-cooled, four stroke aircraft engine, 75 kW (101 hp)
- Propellers: 2-bladed composite

Performance

- Maximum speed: 280 km/h (170 mph, 150 kn)
- Cruise speed: 250 km/h (160 mph, 130 kn)
- Stall speed: 64 km/h (40 mph, 35 kn)
