= Liuchow Kwangsi Type 3 =

Chinese fighter prototype

General information
- Type: Fighter
- National origin: Republic of China
- Manufacturer: Liuchow Mechanical and Aircraft Factory
- Designer: Chee Wing Jeang
- Number built: 1

History
- First flight: 1937

The Liuchow Kwangsi Type 3 was a Chinese fighter prototype prior to the Second World War.

== Development ==
Developed by Chee Wing Jeang, (Note: Also written as Chu Jeng-chang) the Type 3 was a single-seat fighter biplane, the prototype of which was produced by Liuchow Mechanical and Aircraft Factory. It was of mixed construction with spruce and plywood wooden wings, welded steel tube fuselage and covered in fabric and plywood skinning. It was armed with one 7.7mm synchronised machine gun.

== Operational history ==
The prototype was flown for the first time in July 1937. The poor performance of the aircraft resulted in no further development being carried out, although the prototype was delivered to the 32nd Squadron of the Chinese Air Force.

== Operators ==
China

== Specifications ==
Data from The Complete Book of Fighters

General characteristics

- Crew: 1
- Length: 6.25 m (20 ft 6 in)
- Wingspan: 8.00 m (26 ft 3 in)
- Height: 2.50 m (8 ft 2 in)
- Empty weight: 760 kg (1,676 lb)
- Gross weight: 1,043 kg (2,299 lb)
- Powerplant: 1 × Armstrong Siddeley Cheetah IIA 7 cylinder radial engine , 190 kW (260 hp)

Performance

- Maximum speed: 283 km/h (176 mph, 153 kn)
- Endurance: 3 hours
- Time to altitude: 5 min to 5,200 m (17,100 ft)

Armament

- 1 x 7.7 mm machine gun
