= Chasle YC-10 Migrateur =

YC-10 Migrateur

General information
- Type: Single seat sport aircraft
- National origin: France
- Designer: Yves Chasle
- Number built: 1

History
- First flight: 29 May 1981

The Chasle YC-10 Migrateur was a single seat sports aircraft built in France in the early 1980s. Only one was built and it flew for less than 30 hours.

== Design and development ==
The Chasle YC-10 was designed by Yves Chasle and built by Charles Pagès. It was a low wing cantilever monoplane, with straight edged, slightly tapered wings. Originally these were square tipped and without dihedral but after early flight trials streamlined wing tip bodies called salmons and also dihedral were added. It was powered by a 75 kW (100 hp) Rolls-Royce Continental O-200-A air-cooled flat-four engine. Its single seat cockpit was over the wing trailing edge, with the pilot under a prominent two piece perspex canopy. Behind, the round section fuselage tapered rapidly to a broad chord, triangular fin. This carried a deep, tapered rudder and formed a T-tail with its tailplane and elevator mounted on top. Its fixed conventional undercarriage had cantilever legs attached to the wing roots.

The Migrateur made its first flight on 29 May 1981. After only 29 hours of flight it crashed at Tarbes and was not repaired. Only the prototype was built.

== Specifications ==
Data from Gaillard (1981), p.188

General characteristics

- Capacity: One
- Length: 6.20 m (20 ft 4 in)
- Wingspan: 6.26 m (20 ft 6 in) (6.96 m (22 ft 10 in) after salmons and dihedral added)
- Wing area: 6.4 m^{2} (69 sq ft) before wing modifications
- Empty weight: 360 kg (794 lb)
- Gross weight: 520 kg (1,146 lb)
- Powerplant: 1 × Rolls-Royce Continental O-200-A air-cooled flat-four, 75 kW (100 hp)
- Propellers: 2-bladed

Performance

- Maximum speed: 233 km/h (145 mph, 126 kn) at 1,500 m (4,921 ft)
- Cruise speed: 209 km/h (130 mph, 113 kn)
- Endurance: 3 hr
