= Chu Hummingbird =

Chinese experimental helicopter

Hummingbird

General information
- Type: Experimental reconnaissance helicopter
- Manufacturer: Central Aircraft Manufacturing Company
- Designer: C. J. Chu
- Status: unknown
- Number built: 2

History
- Manufactured: 2
- First flight: 1948 (exact date unknown)

The Chu Hummingbird was an experimental co-axial helicopter developed by Chinese aviation engineer Major General C. J. Chu (朱家仁) in China during the 1940s in two versions, designated the Model A and Model B.

Model A was a single seat double rotor test craft used for static (non-flying) test and made its debut in March 1948. This model was destroyed when the rotor broke off.

A replacement craft named Model B was introduced in 1948 and was able to fly, but the aircraft was abandoned when Chu left for Formosa.

Not much is known about either model, as they were abandoned in China after 1949 as Chu evacuated to Taiwan after the victory of the People's Republic of China.

A successor model, the CJC-3, was developed by Chu in Taiwan in the 1950s.

== Specifications (Hummingbird Model A/B) ==
Jia or Model A

- Number of seats: 1
- Engine:Kinner B-5
- Rotor diameter: 4.8 metres (16 ft) (approx.)
- Gross weight: 589.5 kilograms (1,300 lb)
- Maximum speed (level flight): 136 km/h (84 mph, 73 kn)
- Maximum climb rate: 910 metres (2,990 ft)
- Ceiling: Unknown
- Range: 219 kilometres (136 mi)

Yi or Model B

- Number of seats: 1
- Engine:Kinner B-5
- Rotor diameter: 4.8 metres (16 ft) (approx.)
- Gross weight: 589.5 kilograms (1,300 lb)
- Maximum speed (level flight): 136 km/h (84 mph, 73 kn)
- Maximum climb rate: 910 metres (2,990 ft)
- Ceiling: Unknown
- Range: 219 kilometres (136 mi)
