= Chu CJC-3 =

Taiwanese experimental helicopter

CJC-3/CJC-3A
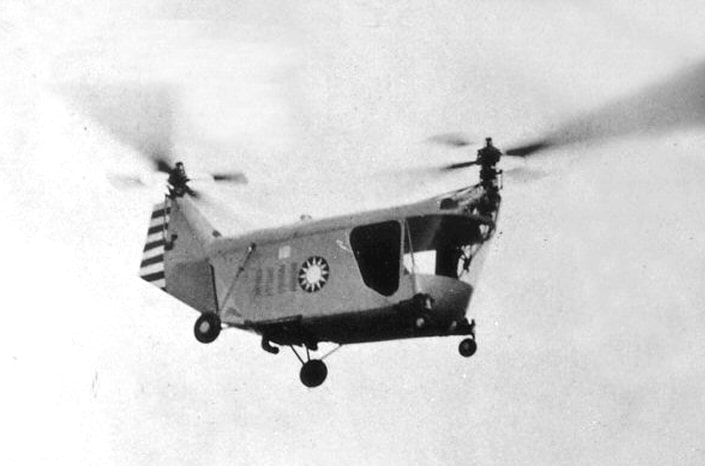
- Chu CJC-3 test flight

General information
- Type: Helicopter
- Manufacturer: unknown - likely Air Force Aircraft Manufacturing Factory
- Designer: C.J. Chu
- Status: unknown
- Number built: 1

History
- Manufactured: 1
- First flight: 1952; 1956

CJC-3 was an experimental tandem rotor helicopter developed in the Republic of China (Taiwan) during the 1950s under the direction of Major General C.J. Chu (朱家仁).

Chu was a Chinese aeronautics engineer, who returned to China following his graduation from MIT in 1926. Chu joined the KMT National Revolutionary Army and was in charge of an aircraft plant in Yunnan that assembled American aircraft and the Soviet Polikarpov I-15.

Chu developed his first helicopter in 1945 which he called the Hummingbird Model A. This single seat test craft never flew and was used for static tests until it was damaged when the rotor broke. Chu began to work on another helicopter he called the Hummingbird Model B. This single seat helicopter was similar to the Model A, but achieved flight.

Following the fall of the mainland to the People's Republic of China in 1949, Chu fled to Taiwan and the helicopter program was scrapped. It was not until the early 1950s that Chu returned with a larger tandem helicopter called the CJC-3. This was flown and tested in Taiwan in 1952. An upgraded version called the CJC-3A appeared in 1956. Both the CJC-3 and CJC-3A were likely influenced by American helicopter manufacturer Piasecki, based on the strikingly similar design.

== Specifications (CJC-3 and CJC-3A) ==
- Number of seats: 2
- Engine: 1 x Lycoming rated 190 hp
- Rotor diameter: 6.47m
- Gross weight: 930 kg, empty weight: 680 kg
- Maximum speed: 180 km/h, cruising speed: 136 km/h
- Inclining climb: 466m/min
- Ceiling: 3660m
- Range: 216 km

== See also ==
- P-V Engineering Forum PV-2
