= Short 31/26 =

Unrealised 1927 British project for an autogyro flying boat

General information
- Type: autogyro flying boat patrol aircraft
- National origin: UK
- Manufacturer: Short Brothers
- Designer: Juan de la Cierva and Arthur Gouge
- Status: Abandoned project

The Short 31/26 was an unrealised (Note: Lambermont & Pirie (1970, p.135) say that this aircraft was actually built but provide no evidence to support this claim. Neither Barnes (1989, p.455) in his comprehensive survey of Shorts designs nor Brooks (1988, p.87) in his similar work on Cierva designs say that this aircraft progressed further than a model for testing.) 1927 project to develop an autogyro flying boat to meet UK Air Ministry specification 31/26. It is also known by its Cierva design number Cierva C.13 or Cierva C.14.

== Design ==
On 11 July 1927, the UK Air Ministry issued specification 31/26: Gyroplane boat seaplane (Jupiter engine). The specification called for "the design and construction of a three-seater gyroplane boat seaplane, embodying the principles of the La Cierva autogiro."

The specification goes on to describe a flying boat with positions for a pilot, observer, and gunner. The gunner was to sit in a forward cockpit and be armed with a Lewis gun mounted on a Scarff ring. The aircraft was also to be able to carry twelve bombs that could be launched via an RL tube. A 485-horsepower (362 kW) Bristol Jupiter VIII radial engine was specified for the powerplant. The aircraft was to be capable of 100 miles per hour (160 km/h) and have a stall speed not greater than 40 miles per hour (64 km/h). In addition to its rotor, it was to have fixed wings.

== Development ==
Development was conducted in partnership between Juan de la Cierva and Short Brothers chief designer Arthur Gouge. A two-bladed (Note: Lambermont & Pirie (1970, p.135) claim it was four-bladed.) main rotor was chosen, to be fitted on a pylon above a metal hull. Sponsons were to be fitted for stability on the water.

A model was constructed and tested in the Short Brothers tank at their Rochester factory, but development progressed no further. The experiments showed problems with vibration, which aviation historian Peter W. Brooks notes "would almost certainly have proved unsuperable at this period."

== Specifications (as designed) ==
Data from Air Ministry 1927, and as noted

General characteristics

- Crew: 3: pilot, observer, and gunner
- Useful load:1,705 pounds (773 kg)
- Powerplant: 1 × Bristol Jupiter VIII air-cooled, nine-cylinder, single-row radial engine, 485 hp (362 kW)
- Main rotor diameter: 52 ft 6 in (16.00 m)

Performance

- Maximum speed: 100 mph (160 km/h, 87 kn)
- Stall speed: 40 mph (64 km/h, 35 kn)
- Rate of climb: 450 ft/min (2.3 m/s)

Armament

- Guns: 1 × .303-inch (7.7 mm) Lewis gun on No.7 Scarff ring with 6 double-drums of ammunition
- Bombs: 12 bombs launched via RL tube

== Notes ==
=== Bibliography ===
- Barnes, Christopher Henry (1988). Shorts aircraft since 1900. London: Putnam.
- Brooks, Peter W. (1988). Cierva Autogiros: The Development of Rotary-Wing Flight. Washington D.C.: Smithsonian Institution.
- "Gyroplane boat seaplane (Jupiter engine)" (Document). London: Air Ministry. 11 July 1927.
- The Illustrated Encyclopedia of Aircraft. London: Aerospace Publishing.
- Lambermont, Paul; Pirie, Anthony (1970). Helicopters and Autogyros of the World. London: Cassell.
