= Chyetverikov SPL =

SPL
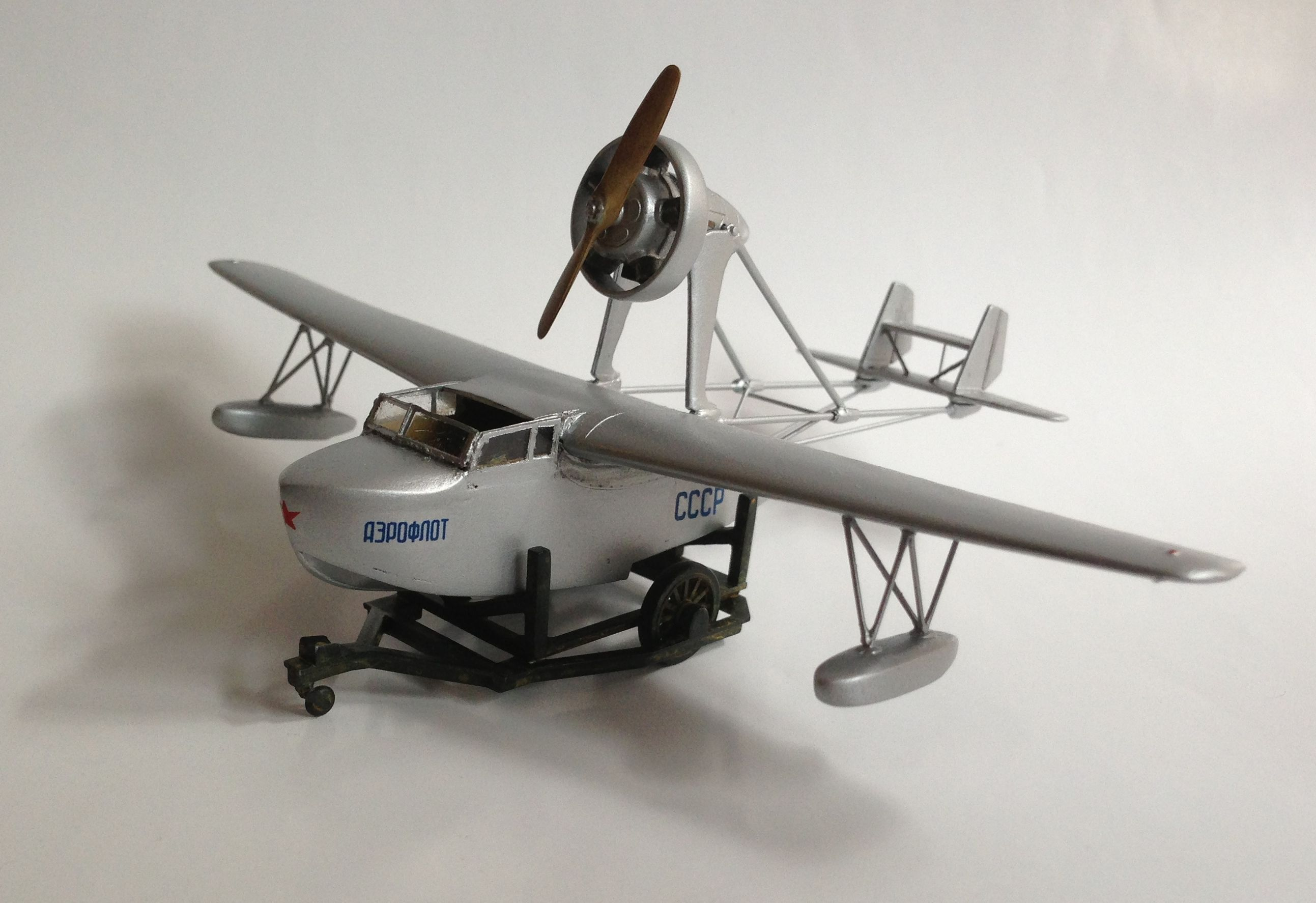

General information
- Type: Submarine Borne Folding Flying Boat
- National origin: USSR
- Manufacturer: Chyetverikov
- Designer: Igor Vyacheslavovich Chyetverikov
- Number built: 2

History
- First flight: July 1934

The SPL (Samolyet dlya Podvodnikh Lodok – aeroplane for submarine boats) (a.k.a. OSGA-101, and Gidro-1) was a submarine borne flying boat designed and built in the USSR from 1931.

== Development ==
After successful trials by the Royal Navy, with submarine borne aircraft, using the Parnall Peto and the M-class submarines, the V-MF (Voenno-morskoj flot – Naval Fleet") wanted to deploy aircraft from cruiser submarines for open sea reconnaissance. In 1931 Chyetverikov had given a proposal for a submarine-launched folding flying boat to the head of TsKB (Tsentrahl'noye Konstrooktorskoye byuro – central construction bureau) but nothing was heard for two years until the NII (Naoochno-Issledovatel'skiy Institoot – scientific test institute) placed an order for two prototypes of the SPL. To prove the design, aerodynamically and hydrodynamically, Chyetverikov designed and built a non-folding version of the SPL with manually retracting landing gear designated OSGA-101.

Completed in 1934 the OSGA-101 was flown for the first time by A.V. Krzhizhevskii and completed flight trials satisfactorily. The OSGA-101 was of mixed construction with wooden wings and hull but Welded steel tube booms carrying the fabric covered Duralumin tail unit. Accommodation was for three with two pilots side by side and a third seat to the rear of the pilots. The SPL was very similar but included shorter span wings which folded to lie alongside the fuselage, only two seats in the cockpit, and a pivoting engine nacelle which folded rearwards to lie between the tail-booms. The folded SPL was to be fitted in a water-tight cylinder 2.5m (8 ft 2½in) in diameter and 7.45m (24 ft 5¼in) long, with five minutes allowed for withdrawal and preparation for flight.

Flight trials of the SPL commenced at Sevastopol early in 1935, piloted by A.V. Krzhizhevskii, and were completed by August 1935, but the SPL was rejected due to poor seaworthiness. After the trials the prototype was rechristened Gidro-1, given to Osoaviakhim, and used to set various class records.

== Variants ==
- OSGA-101 – The non folding first prototype of the SPL.
- Gidro-1 – The SPL prototype renamed after transfer to Osoaviakhim.

== Specifications (SPL) ==
Data from Gunston, Bill. "The Osprey Encyclopaedia of Russian Aircraft 1875–1995". London, Osprey. 1995. ISBN 1-85532-405-9

General characteristics

- Crew: 2
- Length: 7.4 m (24 ft 3.5 in)
- Wingspan: 9.5 m (31 ft 6 in)
- Wing area: 13.4 m^{2} (144 sq ft)
- Empty weight: 592 kg (1,305 lb)
- Powerplant: 1 × M-11 , 74.6 kW (100 hp)

Performance

- Maximum speed: 186 km/h (115.6 mph, 100.5 kn)
- Cruise speed: 183 km/h (114 mph, 99 kn)
- Range: 400 km (248 mi, 216 nmi)

== See also ==
Aircraft of comparable role, configuration, and era

- Aichi M6A Seiran
- Besson MB.411
- Loening XSL-1
- Parnall Peto
- Yokosuka E14Y

Related lists

- List of flying boats and floatplanes

== Bibliography ==
- Gaillard, Pierre (March 2000). "Courrier des Lecteurs" [Readers' Letters]. Avions: Toute l'aéronautique et son histoire (in French) (84): 5. ISSN 1243-8650.
- Gunston, Bill. "The Osprey Encyclopaedia of Russian Aircraft 1875–1995". London, Osprey. 1995. ISBN 1-85532-405-9
- Passingham, Malcolm (February 2000). "Les hydravions embarqués sur sous-marins" [Submarine-carried Seaplanes]. Avions: Toute l'aéronautique et son histoire (in French) (83): 7–17. ISSN 1243-8650.
- Taylor, Michael J. H. "Jane's Encyclopedia of Aviation". Studio Editions. London. 1989. ISBN 0-517-69186-8
