= Civil Aviation Department RG-1 Rohini =

RG-1 Rohini

General information
- Type: Training sailplane
- National origin: India
- Manufacturer: Veegal Engines and Engineering/Hindustan Aeronautics Limited
- Designer: S Ramamritham
- Number built: 107

History
- First flight: 10 May 1961

The Civil Aviation Department RG-1 Rohini (Literally means Tropic Bird) is an Indian two-seat training sailplane of the 1960s. A high-winged wooden monoplane, with side-by-side seating;at least 107 were built.

== Development and design ==
The Technical Centre of the Indian Civil Aviation Department is its research and development arm, and started design and production of sailplanes in 1950. In the early 1960s S Ramamritham designed a two-seat training sailplane, the RG-1 Rohini, the first of four prototypes flying on 10 May 1961. The Rohini is a monoplane of wooden construction, with a braced high wing and a low mounted tail positioned forward of the fin. Its crew of two sit side by side in an open cockpit, while the aircraft's undercarriage consists of a single unsprung wheel under the fuselage, with skids under the nose and tail.

A total of 17 Rohinis were built by Veegal Engines and Engineering of Calcutta, with Hindustan Aeronautics Limited building a further 86 RG-1s by 1971.

== Specifications (RG-1 Rohini) ==
Data from Jane's All The World's Aircraft 1971-72 The World's Sailplanes:Die Segelflugzeuge der Welt:Les Planeurs du Monde Volume II

General characteristics

- Crew: 2
- Length: 7.18 m (23 ft 7 in)
- Wingspan: 16.56 m (54 ft 4 in)
- Height: 2.33 m (7 ft 8 in)
- Wing area: 20.76 m^{2} (223.5 sq ft)
- Aspect ratio: 13.2:1
- Airfoil: NACA 4418 at root, NACA 4412 (modified) at tip
- Empty weight: 274 kg (604 lb)
- Gross weight: 494 kg (1,089 lb)

Performance

- Stall speed: 48 km/h (30 mph, 26 kn)
- Never exceed speed: 184 km/h (114 mph, 99 kn)
- Aerotow speed: 112 km/h (69.6 mph; 60.5 kn)
- Winch launch speed: 96 km/h (59.7 mph; 51.8 kn)
- g limits: +5 -2.5
- Maximum glide ratio: 21:1 at 77 km/h (47.8 mph; 41.6 kn)
- Rate of sink: 0.85 m/s (167 ft/min) at 61 km/h (37.9 mph; 32.9 kn)

== See also ==
Aircraft of comparable role, configuration, and era Slingsby T.21 Related lists List of gliders
