= Clifton Trio =

Trio

General information
- Type: Midget Racer
- National origin: United States of America
- Designer: Jene Clifton, Jack Clifton

History
- First flight: 1953

The Clifton Trio is a homebuilt midget air racer built in the early 1950s.

== Design and development ==
The Clifton Trio was built from salvaged parts and tubing.

The Clifton Trio is a single seat, conventional landing geared, strut-braced, low-wing aircraft using steel tube construction with aircraft fabric covering. It was first built as an open cockpit aircraft and was modified for an enclosed canopy.

== Specifications (Clifton Trio) ==
Data from Flying

General characteristics

- Capacity: 1
- Length: 16 ft (4.9 m)
- Wingspan: 22 ft (6.7 m)
- Empty weight: 630 lb (286 kg)
- Powerplant: 1 × Continental O-170 , 65 hp (48 kW)

Performance

- Cruise speed: 109 kn (125 mph, 201 km/h)
- Rate of climb: 1,000 ft/min (5.1 m/s)
