= Chernov Che-24 =

Che-24

General information
- Type: Single engine light flying boat
- National origin: Russia
- Manufacturer: Gidrosamolet LCC (Seaplane Ltd)
- Designer: Boris Chernov

History
- First flight: 19 October 2010

The Gidrosamlet Che-24, 26 and 29 are closely related light flying boats designed and built in Russia from 2010.

== Design and development ==
The Ch-24, Che-26 and Che-29 are braced, parasol wing monoplane flying boats, which differ in the number and type of engines and in their seat numbers. The wings are identical, with no sweep and constant chord out to trapezoidal, upturned tips. Full span, slotted flaperons are fitted. There are two streamlined bracing struts on each side, one from mid-fuselage to about one third span and a shorter, more vertical one from higher on the fuselage. These are assisted by further light struts bracing the rear of the wing centre section via the cabin roof. The engines, one placed centrally on the Ch-24 and two on the other variants are all mounted above and forward of the wing leading edge. The fin, integral with the fuselage, and balanced rudder are swept, tapered and generous. The tailplane is mounted midway up the fin, externally braced from below. Both the rudder and elevators have electrically powered trim tabs.

The fuselage, a two step hull design, is a fibreglass structure on all models with the glazed cabin well below the wing underside. The two seat Che-24 and Che-26 have the same length, side by side seats and upward opening doors. The Che-29 is 400 mm (15.7 in) longer and has a second pair of seats behind the first. Fixed wing tip floats, each mounted on parallel pairs of struts, provide stability on water where a water rudder under the fin is used for manoeuvring. All types have the option of an amphibious conventional undercarriage; the small mainwheels are on short cantilever legs which can be rotated upwards out of the water.

== Variants ==
Data from Jane's All the World's Aircraft 2013-4 pp. 522–4

Che-24
Original version, as described below with single Rotax engine and two seats. First flown 18 October 2010.
Che-26
Twin engines, with a choice between 51.5 kW (69.1 hp) twin cylinder inline Sauer S650 or 48 kW (64.4 hp) Rotax 582. Empty weight as amphibian, 400 kg (882 lb). Two seats.
Che-29
Twin engines, with a choice between 73.5 kW (98.6 hp) Rotax 912 ULS or 123 kW (165 hp) Subaru EJ25 water-cooled flat fours. 400 mm (15.7 in) longer than the Che-24 and -26 and 310 kg (683 lb) heavier empty (Rotax 912 version) than the Che-26, with four seats. First flown 4 November 2011.

== Specifications (Che-24) ==
Data from Jane's All the World's Aircraft 2013-4 pp.522-4

General characteristics

- Capacity: Two
- Length: 7.50 m (24 ft 7 in)
- Wingspan: 11.22 m (36 ft 10 in)
- Height: 2.70 m (8 ft 10 in)
- Airfoil: GA(W)-1
- Empty weight: 380 kg (838 lb)
- Gross weight: 750 kg (1,653 lb)
- Fuel capacity: 47 kg (103 lb), 65 L (14.3 Imp gal, 17.2 US gal)
- Powerplant: 1 × Rotax 912 ULS-2 , 73.5 kW (98.6 hp) liquid cooled flat four
- Propellers: 3-bladed FPP VC-5U, with three blade, variable pitch, 1:2.43 reduction gear

Performance

- Maximum speed: 160 km/h (99 mph, 86 kn)
- Cruise speed: 140 km/h (87 mph, 76 kn) normal; economical 125 km/h (78 mph; 67 kn)
- Never exceed speed: 200 km/h (120 mph, 110 kn)
- Range: 900 km (560 mi, 490 nmi) 30 min reserves
- Service ceiling: 1,500 m (4,900 ft)
- Rate of climb: 2.7 m/s (530 ft/min)
- Power/mass: 98 W/kg (0.06 hp/lb)
- Take-off: Run 150 m (492 ft); unstick 75 km/h; 47 mph; 40 kn
