= RRG Delta I =

German two-seat glider, 1930

Delta I
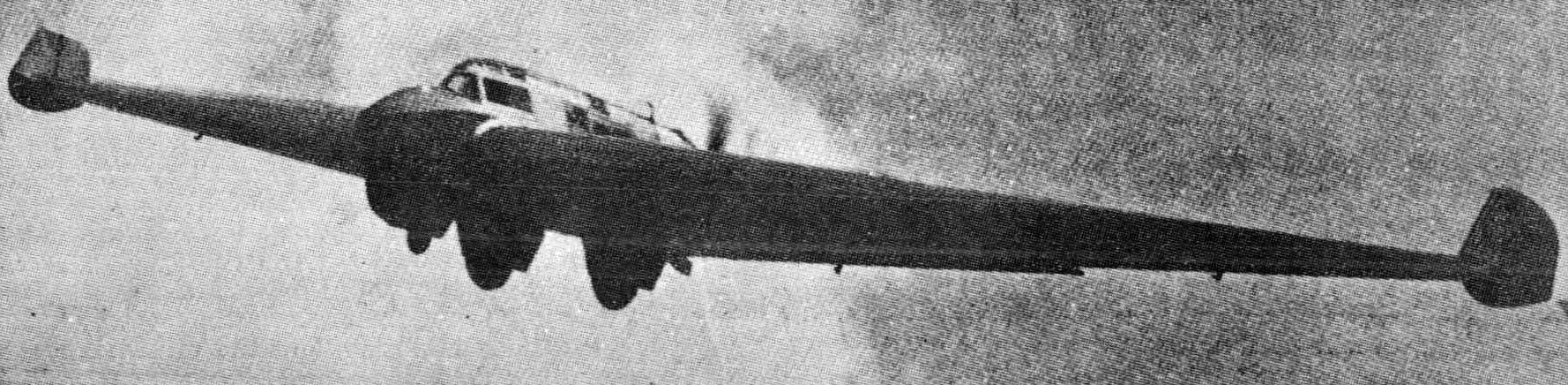
- The motorized Delta IM

General information
- Type: experimental delta wing aircraft
- National origin: Germany
- Manufacturer: RRG
- Designer: Alexander Lippisch
- Number built: 1

History
- First flight: 1930

The RRG Delta I was a German experimental tailless aircraft flown in the early 1930s first as a glider and then powered. It was one of the first delta wing aircraft.

== Design and development ==
The first tailless aircraft that Alexander Lippisch saw was the Weltensegler glider, which flew briefly at the second Rhön contest in 1921. He was impressed by its initial stability, though a turn led to an uncontrolled spiral dive followed by breakup and the death of its pilot. In response he built several models and also designed the full size but disappointing Espenlaub E 2. After some time designing more conventional types and becoming Technical Head of the RRG in 1925 he returned to the tailless glider layout. He began in 1927 with the RRG Storch, which was rather like the Espenlaub and was progressively modified. All of these aircraft had wings with sweep on both leading and trailing edges. In 1930 his first design with a straight, unswept trailing edge flew; he named it the Delta I.

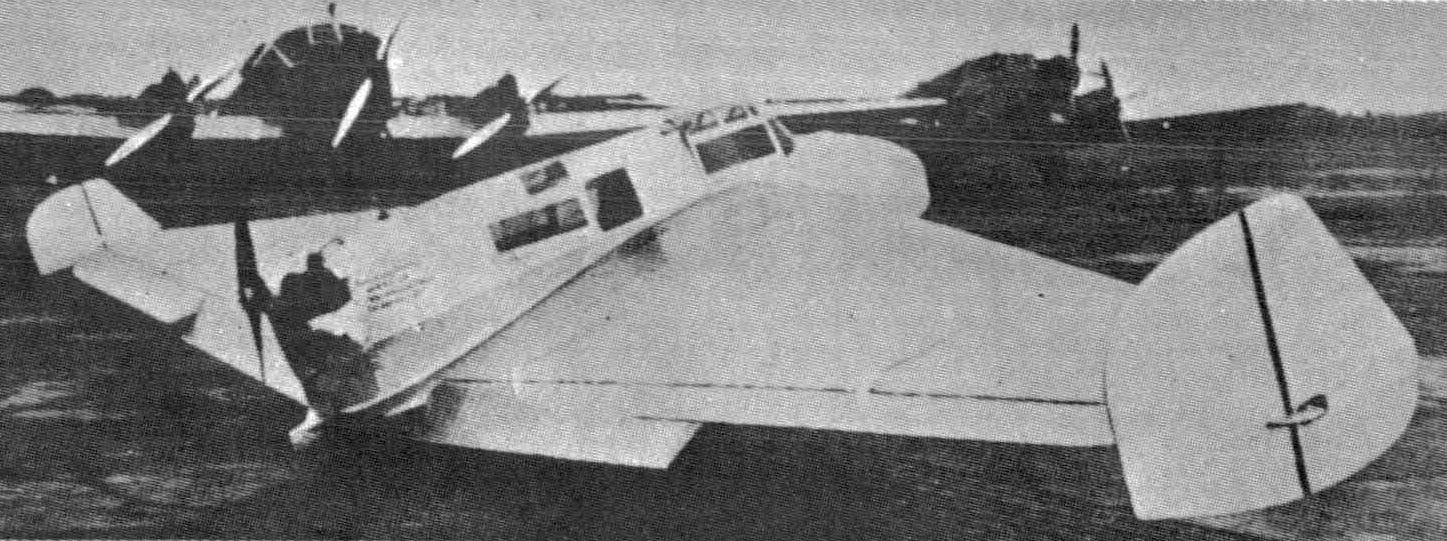

Its straight leading edge was swept at 20°. Following the standard practice of the time the wing had a single spar, with plywood covering ahead of it, forming a torsion resistant D-box. There were diagonal internal struts close to the wing roots and further ply skin strengthened these areas. The rest of the wing was fabric covered. The thickness was decreased markedly by the upward slope of the underside, providing dihedral. The Delta's trailing edge was equally divided between outboard ailerons and inboard elevators. As on the Storch, the wing tips were cropped and carried small, roughly triangular, ply-covered fins mounting longer, rounded rectangular, fabric covered rudders. The inner surfaces of the fins and rudders were cambered as a conventional tail rudder would be but the outer surfaces were flat. The rudders operated independently, each with its own foot pedal. To turn to port, for example, the pilot would press only the lefthand pedal to swing its rudder outwards where it acted more like an airbrake, turning the glider to port with its drag.

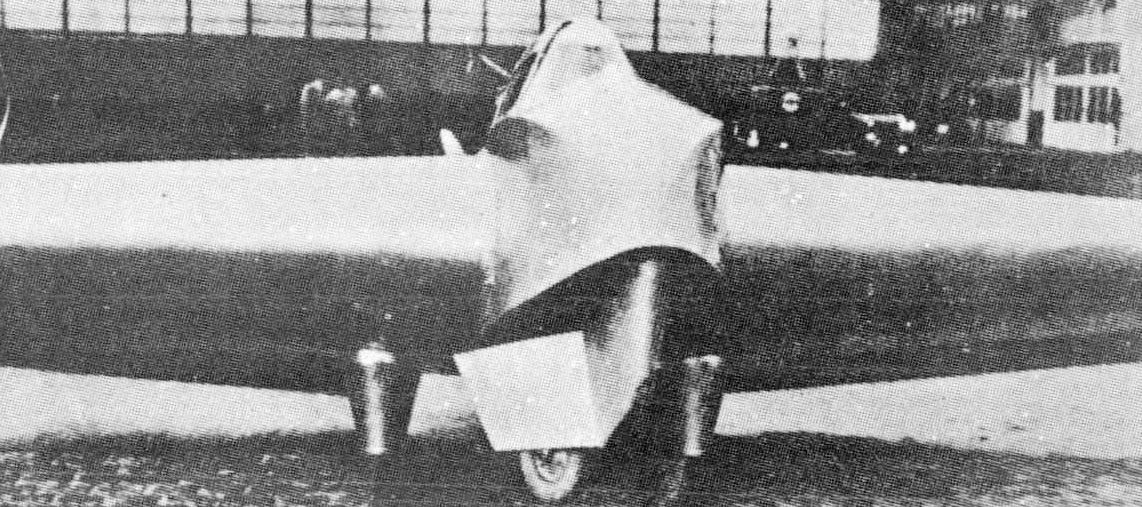
above: the motorized Delta IM

The fuselage of the original glider was a simple, oval-section, ply-covered nacelle. Its pilot sat in an enclosed cockpit under the wing, with a transparency in the wing edge ahead and another above. A pair of smaller windows on each side provided landing views. Landings were made on a nearly nacelle-length sprung skid. There was a second cockpit at about mid-chord with another transparency above it and a pair of windows on each side. The fuselage tapered to an angled vertical knife-edge.

The addition in 1931 of a pusher configuration, 30 hp (22 kW), horizontally opposed Bristol Cherub III well above the rear of the wing with its small, metal, two-bladed propeller just beyond the trailing edge significantly altered the fuselage, though it did not lengthen it. A raised roof line continued from the engine housing forward, providing space above the wing for three windows on each side for the observer and a more conventional, framed cockpit above and forward of the wing. The lower fuselage was modified by a fixed, tricycle undercarriage with closely spaced, trousered main legs, rubber-sprung mainwheels with low pressure tyres, a shrouded, steerable nosewheel and a little tailwheel. As a result the empty weight increased by 140 kg (310 lb) compared with the glider. The wing remained unchanged. Sometimes known as the Lippisch Delta IM, the motorized Delta was named "Hermann Kohl" after the leader of the first East-West North Atlantic crossing.

== Operational history ==
The glider version of the Delta I first flew in 1930 and took part in that year's Rhön contest. RRG then converted it into the powered Delta IM and Günther Groenhoff conducted its first flight in 1931. Though take-offs have been described as "difficult", Groenhoff said it was light on the controls and capable of any manoeuvres expected of conventional aircraft including a loop. Independent observers at a demonstration did not see the latter but were impressed with its manoeuvrability, its apparent reserves of power, despite the small engine, and its reluctance to stall. It flew until 1933 when it crashed heavily.

== Specifications (Delta IM) ==
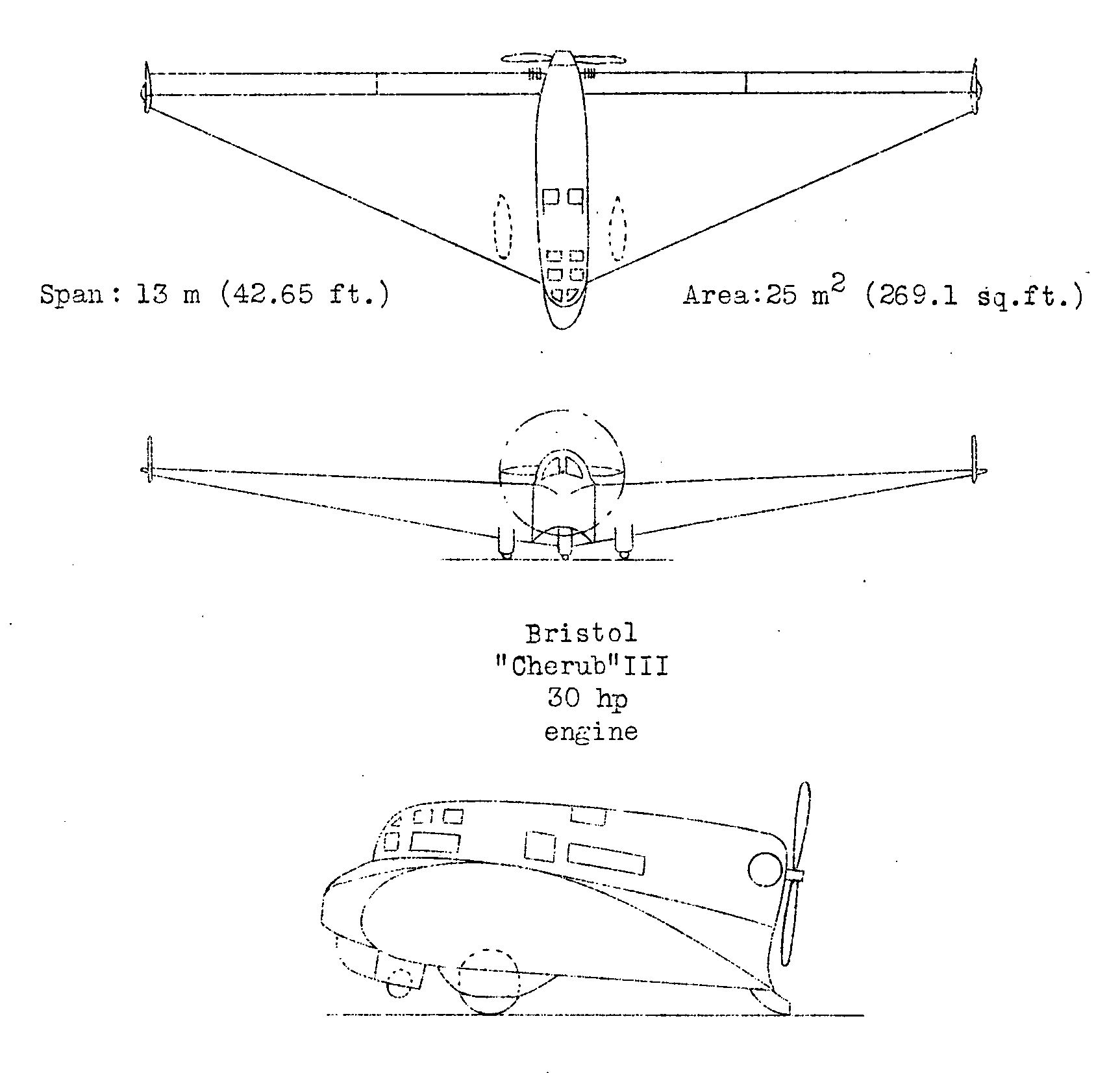

Data from Dimensions j2mcl Planeurs, weights, power and performance Flight (October 1931)

General characteristics

- Crew: one
- Capacity: one observer
- Length: 4.25 m (13 ft 11 in)
- Wingspan: 13.24 m (43 ft 5 in)
- Height: 4.5 m (14 ft 9 in)
- Wing area: 25.8 m^{2} (278 sq ft)
- Aspect ratio: 6.8
- Empty weight: 320 kg (705 lb)
- Gross weight: 520 kg (1,146 lb)
- Powerplant: 1 × Bristol Cherub III 2-cylinder air-cooled horizontally-opposed piston engine, 22 kW (30 hp)
- Propellers: 2-bladed

Performance

- Maximum speed: 155 km/h (96 mph, 84 kn)
- Cruise speed: 140 km/h (87 mph, 76 kn)
- Service ceiling: 4,700 m (15,400 ft) at least
