= Cessna XMC =

American light aircraft demonstrator

XMC
- 3-view

General information
- Type: Technology demonstrator
- National origin: United States
- Manufacturer: Cessna
- Status: Development canceled in 1972
- Primary user: Cessna
- Number built: 1

History
- First flight: January 22, 1971

The Cessna XMC was a prototype technology demonstrator designed to show advanced aerodynamics and materials. The marketing name of XMC stood for "Experimental Magic Carpet", with the single test aircraft designated Cessna 1014 and later 1034 in company documentation.

== Design and development ==
The two-seat Cessna XMC was built to test several concepts in light aircraft design including a ducted propeller and swept cantilever wing. The program ran from the beginning of 1971 until the end of 1972. The aircraft was used to assess improved visibility, center of gravity effects, control surface locations and response, cabin noise levels and also the relationship of wing versus engine and propeller.

The XMC employed metal-to-metal bonding, allowing for experimentation in expanded use for bonding in other types in the Cessna commercial product line. Additional stress testing was also conducted as necessary as the aircraft entered further testing and modification.

The sole prototype was registered as N7174C and given Cessna serial number 674. It was powered by a Continental O-200 100 hp (75 kW) engine mounted in pusher configuration. This was the same powerplant used in the then-current production Cessna 150. The tail boom was similar in design to that used on the Cessna Skymaster.

The first flight of the 1014 model was made on January 22, 1971 by Cessna test pilot Bruce Barrett. The aircraft was modified in 1972 and given a new model number, 1034. In this configuration it was first flown June 1, 1972, again with Bruce Barrett at the controls.

== Operational history ==
=== Test program ===
The test program consisted of three phases:

Phase I - Model 1014 - January 1971
Ground handling, flying characteristics and visibility testing
Phase II - Model 1014 - May 1971
Exploring methods of reducing weight and production costs for single and twin-engine Cessnas
Phase III - Model 1034 - June 1972
Use of shrouded propeller to test improvements in propeller efficiency and reduction of noise

=== Test results ===
The XMC project ended in 1972. The aircraft configuration proved to have higher cabin noise levels than the production Cessna 150 and offered no performance advantages over the older design.

== Variants ==
Model 1014 XMC
The single aircraft in its initial configuration with unducted pusher propeller and fully faired nose wheel.
Model 1034 XMC
The same aircraft was modified in 1972 with a shrouded propeller to explore two design areas: improvement of the propulsive efficiency and noise reduction. The spatted nose gear was replaced by a wheel fairing, as was the main gear. An increased vertical stabilizer area and revised wing tips were also tested.

== Specifications (Cessna XMC prototype) ==
Data from The Cessnas that got away & Cessna XMC

General characteristics

- Crew: 1
- Capacity: 1 Flight test observer
- Length: 23 ft 0 in (7.01 m)
- Wingspan: 32 ft 0 in (9.75 m)
- Powerplant: 1 × Continental O-200 4-cyl. horizontally opposed air-cooled piston engine, 100 hp (75 kW)

Performance
