= Civilian Aircraft Company =

British aircraft manufacturer

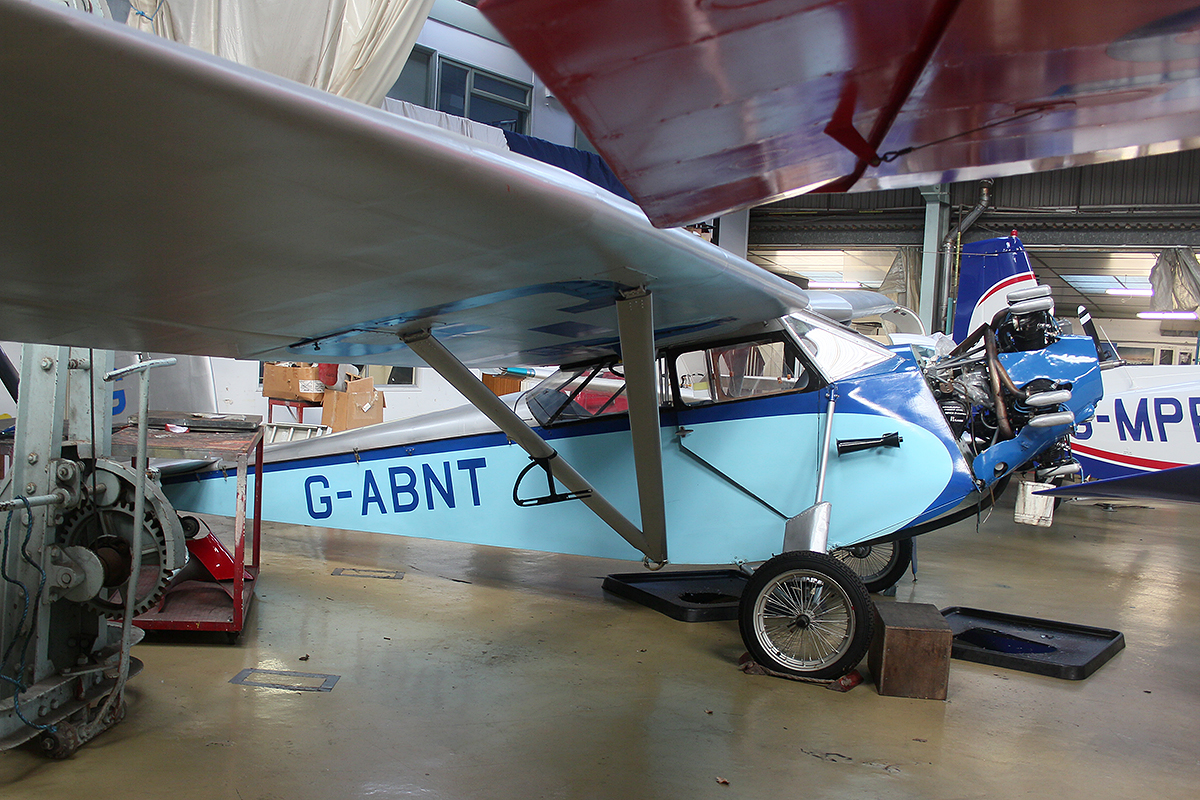
- Civilian Coupé–the only product of the company
- Company type: Privately held company
- Industry: Aviation
- Founded: 1928
- Founder: Harold Boultbee
- Defunct: 1933
- Fate: Bankrupt
- Headquarters: Hull Municipal Airport, Hedon, United Kingdom
- Products: Fixed-wing aircraft

The Civilian Aircraft Company was a British aircraft manufacturer between 1928 and 1933.

== History ==
The company was formed in 1928 at Burton-on-Trent by Harold Boultbee, a former Handley Page aircraft designer, who became the managing director and chief designer. The company established a factory on the southern perimeter of the Hull Municipal Airport, at Hedon. The company only produced one aircraft type, the Civilian Coupé a two-seat light monoplane. After producing six aircraft the company became bankrupt and the factory at Hedon closed in 1933.

== Aircraft ==
- 1929 - Civilian Coupé
