= Chu XP-0 =

Chinese WWII fighter plane prototype

General information
- Type: Fighter
- National origin: China
- Manufacturer: AFAMF—Air Force Aircraft Manufacturing Factory
- Designer: Maj. Gen. Chu Chia-Jen
- Number built: 1

History
- First flight: 1943

The Chu XP-0, also known as the Chu (AFAMF) XP-0, was a Chinese fighter prototype in the Second World War.

== Development ==
Designed by the Chief of the Air Force Technical Bureau, Major General Chu Chia-Jen, in 1941, the XP-0 was a single-seat fighter monoplane, the single prototype of which was produced by AFAMF in 1943. Based largely on the Curtiss Hawk 75, it was of mixed construction with wooden three-spar wings, welded steel tube fuselage and plywood skinning. It could carry up to four 20 mm cannons underwing, and had capacity to carry bombs via a centreline bomb rack, allowing it to function as a dive bomber.

== Operational history ==
It was anticipated that the XP-0 would be produced in series at AFAMF No. 1 factory at Kunming, however the prototype was flown for the first time in 1943, at Yangling. After circling the airfield, the XP-0 landed too fast, ground-looped and was written off. In the meantime, the American entry into World War II meant that American fighters were available to the Chinese, removing the need for China to manufacture indigenous fighter aircraft. As such no further production was carried out. No data except armament, construction and engine have survived.

== Operators ==
China

- Republic of China Air Force

== Specifications (Chu XP-0) ==
Data from

General characteristics

- Crew: 1
- Length: 8.8 m (28 ft 10.5 in)
- Wingspan: 11.4 m (37 ft 5 in)
- Height: 3.7 m (12 ft 2 in)
- Wing area: 22 m^{2} (236.8 sq ft)
- Gross weight: 2,990 kg (6,592 lb)
- Powerplant: 1 × Pratt & Whitney R-1830-S1C3-G Twin Wasp radial engine , 894 kW (1,200 hp)

Performance

- Maximum speed: 504 km/h (313 mph, 272 kn)
- Cruise speed: 450 km/h (280 mph, 240 kn)
- Range: 1,400 km (870 mi, 760 nmi)
- Service ceiling: 9,850 m (32,320 ft)

Armament

- Guns: 4 × 20 mm Hispano-Suiza underwing cannon
- Bombs: 2 × bombs or torpedoes

== See also ==
Related development

- Curtiss Hawk 75

Aircraft of comparable role, configuration, and era

- Nakajima Ki-44
- Polikarpov I-185
