= Civilian Coupé =

Coupé
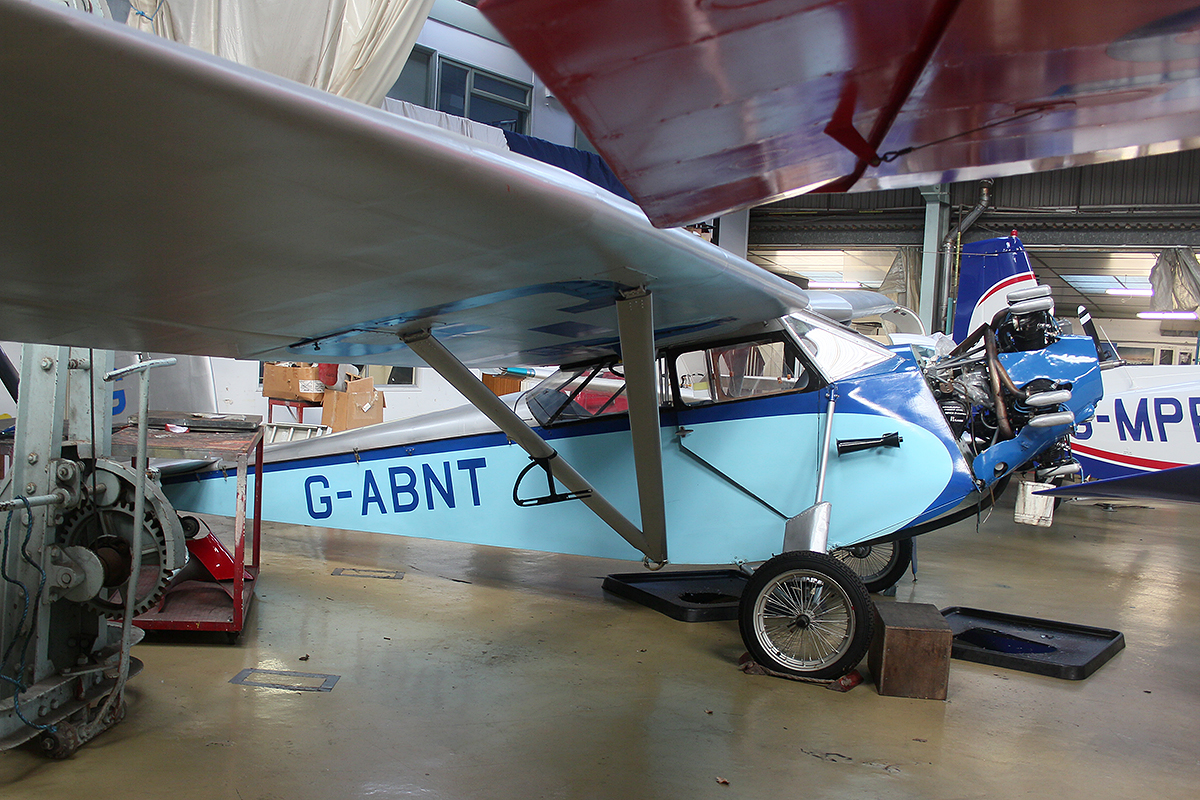

General information
- Type: Two-seat private aircraft
- National origin: United Kingdom
- Manufacturer: Civilian Aircraft Company
- Designer: Harold Boultbee
- Number built: 5

History
- First flight: July 1929

The Civilian Coupé is a British, single-engined two-seat private monoplane built starting in 1929. Only five were made, and it was the Civilian Aircraft Company's only product, but one still flies in the UK.

== Design and development ==
In 1928 Harold Boultbee left Handley Page to form the Civilian Aircraft Company. The Coupé was its only product, an aircraft of mixed metal and wood construction. It was aimed at the private market and was quite advanced for its day. The Coupé is a high-winged monoplane, the wing vee-strut braced to the lower fuselage longerons. The wings fold for transport and storage. They have almost constant chord, with slight taper outboard and a gentle reduction in chord at the trailing edge to help rearward visibility. There is glazing at the centre section for an upward view from the enclosed cabin where pilot and passenger sit in seats not quite side by side.

The fuselage has a square cross-section, decreasing in depth towards the tail and is plywood-covered. Tail surfaces are nearly rectangular, though the rudder extends below the tailplane and elevators to the bottom of the fuselage, where it curves in smoothly. A split-axle undercarriage is mounted from the lower fuselage with the main legs fixed to the upper longerons; there is a tailskid. Unusually for its time, the wheels have brakes and the flying controls are pushrod-operated.

The Coupé first flew in July 1929, powered by a 75 hp (56 kW) A.B.C. Hornet air-cooled flat four engine driving a two-bladed propeller. The sole aircraft with this engine became known as the Mk.I and all later Coupés, which used the 100 hp (75 kW) Armstrong Siddeley Genet Major I five-cylinder radial, as Mk.IIs. In both engine installations, cylinder heads are exposed for cooling. It took about 18 months before teething problems, chiefly vibration transmitted by the engine mounting, were cured.

== Operational history ==
In all, five Coupés were probably built and certainly five are recorded by UK Civil Aviation Authority, one of which, G-ABNT, still flies in 2010 though no others survive. The last Mk.II built went immediately to a German owner and crashed during the war but the other three Coupés were raced in the UK between 1931 and 1933, though without great success. Later one of them was sold to a Dutch owner and the prototype also went abroad. By 1934 the Civilian Aircraft Company had closed down and only two Coupés were active.

At present the last remaining one is based at Biggin Hill

== Variants ==
- Coupé Mk.I - A.B.C Hornet engine
- Coupé Mk.II - Armstrong Siddeley Genet Major I engine

== Specifications (Mk.II) ==
Data from Jackson 1959, p. 245

General characteristics

- Crew: 1
- Capacity: 1
- Length: 19 ft 4 in (5.59 m)
- Wingspan: 35 ft 6 in (10.82 m)
- Height: 6 ft 3 in (1.91 m)
- Wing area: 167.8 sq ft (15.59 m^{2})
- Empty weight: 985 lb (447 kg)
- Gross weight: 1,500 lb (680 kg)
- Powerplant: 1 × Armstrong Siddeley Genet Major I five-cylinder radial , 100 hp (75 kW)

Performance

- Maximum speed: 110 mph (177 km/h, 96 kn)
- Cruise speed: 96 mph (154 km/h, 83 kn)
- Range: 300 mi (480 km, 260 nmi)
- Service ceiling: 15,000 ft (4,600 m)
- Rate of climb: 810 ft/min (4.1 m/s)
