= Chayair Sycamore =

South African autogyro

Sycamore

General information
- Type: Autogyro
- National origin: South Africa
- Manufacturer: Chayair
- Status: In production (2012)

The Chayair Sycamore is a South African autogyro, designed and produced by Chayair of Musina. The aircraft is supplied as a kit for amateur construction or as a complete ready-to-fly-aircraft.

== Design and development ==
The Sycamore features a single main rotor, a two-seats-in-tandem open or optionally enclosed cockpit, tricycle landing gear with wheel pants and a four-cylinder, liquid and air-cooled, four-stroke, dual-ignition turbocharged 115 hp (86 kW) Rotax 914F engine in pusher configuration. The 160 hp (119 kW) Subaru EJ22 is optional.

The aircraft fuselage is made from bolted-together aluminum tubing and mounts a 9.10 m (29.9 ft) diameter Advanced Kinetics rotor. The tailplane features five vertical tail surfaces for improved directional stability. The enclosed Sycamore Mk 1 version has an empty weight of 380 kg (840 lb) and a gross weight of 590 kg (1,300 lb), giving a useful load of 210 kg (460 lb).

== Operational history ==
By December 2012 one example had been registered in the United States with the Federal Aviation Administration in the Experimental - Amateur-built category.

== Variants ==
Sycamore Mk 1
Enclosed cockpit version
Sycamore Mk 2000
Open cockpit version

== Specifications (Sycamore Mk 1) ==
Data from Bayerl

General characteristics

- Crew: one
- Capacity: one passenger
- Length: 5.40 m (17 ft 9 in)
- Width: 1.9 m (6 ft 3 in)
- Height: 2.80 m (9 ft 2 in)
- Empty weight: 380 kg (838 lb)
- Gross weight: 590 kg (1,301 lb)
- Fuel capacity: 55 litres (12 imp gal; 15 US gal)
- Powerplant: 1 × Rotax 914F four cylinder, liquid and air-cooled, four stroke, turbocharged aircraft engine, 86 kW (115 hp)
- Main rotor diameter: 9.10 m (29 ft 10 in)
- Propellers: 3-bladed Warp Drive Inc carbon fibre

Performance

- Maximum speed: 153 km/h (95 mph, 83 kn)
- Cruise speed: 128 km/h (80 mph, 69 kn)
- Endurance: 2.5 hours
- g limits: +3.5/-0.5
- Rate of climb: 4 m/s (790 ft/min)
