= Chaika L-4 =

2000s Russian twin engine amphibious aircraft

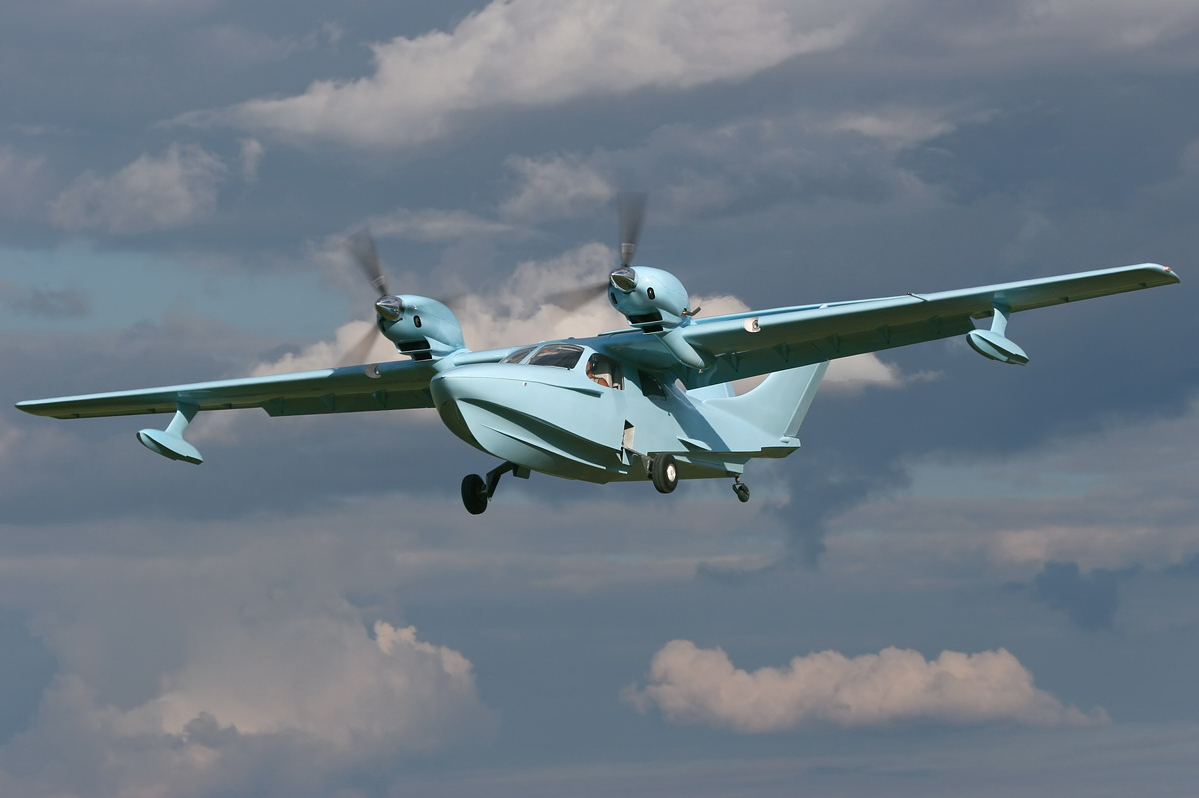
- Chaika L-42

General information
- Type: Twin engine amphibious aircraft
- National origin: Russia
- Manufacturer: Chaika (Seagull Experimental Design Bureau), Samara
- Designer: G. Annenkov
- Primary users: Private operators
- Number built: 14 by mid-2008. all L-6 based aircraft

History
- First flight: June 2005

The Chaika L-4 (чайка, English: gull) is a twin engine amphibious aircraft, designed and built in Russia in the 2000s. It has sold in small numbers and remains in production.

== Design and development ==
Several companies and groups have developed a series of designs which began at an offshoot of the Trod Kuznetsov aircraft engine plant in Samara. Beginning with the L-3, they differ in size and engine type but all are twin engine amphibians with a characteristic V tail. The L-4 is a direct development of the L-6M, promoted by AeroVolga. Its design began in August 2004.

All L-4 variants have the same layout and all are largely built of composite materials. They are high-wing monoplanes with twin engines mounted close to the fuselage, on top of the wing. The wings have straight taper on both edges and almost square tips. The L-4 has a pair of flaps on each wing. Its hull has two steps and there are small winglets at water level just aft of the trailing edge. The cabin extends from below the leading edge rearwards to the winglets. Fixed floats under the wings stabilize the L-4 on water; it is operable with waves to 400 mm (15 in) high. The most unusual feature of the L-4 is the empennage arrangement: it has twin fins, mounted on the fuselage and extended forward with long, curved dorsal fillets, separated at the base by the full fuselage width and leaning slightly outwards. The fins carry conventional rudders and the single tailplane is mounted upon the fin tips, extending well beyond them. Tailplane and single piece elevator together are trapezoidal; there is a trim tab at the centre of the elevator. The reason for the design is that the spine serves as a walkway to access the plane from behind, when moored at shore. The L-4 has a conventional undercarriage for land use, all three wheels and the water rudder being retractable.

The first flight of the L-4 was in June 2005. The most recent variant, the more powerful L-44 flew in 2009.

== Operational history ==
By mid-2008 sales, probably including L-6s from AeroVolga, had reached 14.

== Variants ==
L-4
Original design, no longer produced.
L-42
Improved, with Rotax 912 ULS flat four 73.3 kW (98.6 hp) engines.
L-42M
Further improvements: weight savings, winglets, crew ergonomics. Marketed by Aviatech1.com.
L-44
More powerful Rotax 914 engines, as detailed below. First flown 2009.
L-65
Improved with Rotax 915 iS engines.

== Specifications (Chaika L-44) ==
Data from Jane's All the World's Aircraft 2012/13

General characteristics

- Crew: 1
- Capacity: 3 passengers
- Length: 8.50 m (27 ft 11 in)
- Wingspan: 13.50 m (44 ft 3 in)
- Height: 2.52 m (8 ft 3 in) excluding propellers
- Wing area: 22.45 m^{2} (241.6 sq ft)
- Empty weight: 830 kg (1,830 lb)
- Max takeoff weight: 1,460 kg (3,219 lb)
- Fuel capacity: 230 kg (507 lb)
- Powerplant: 2 × Rotax 914 flat four, turbocharged, mixed air and water cooling, 84.5 kW (113.3 hp) each
- Propellers: 3-bladed Airmaster AR332

Performance

- Maximum speed: 220 km/h (140 mph, 120 kn)
- Cruise speed: 180 km/h (110 mph, 97 kn)
- Never exceed speed: 250 km/h (160 mph, 130 kn)
- Range: 1,598 km (993 mi, 863 nmi)
- Service ceiling: 4,000 m (13,000 ft) service
- Power/mass: 8.64 kg/kW (14.20 lb/hp)
- Take-off run: 250 m (820 ft)
