= Cessna C-106 Loadmaster =

American twin engine transport aircraft

C-106 Loadmaster
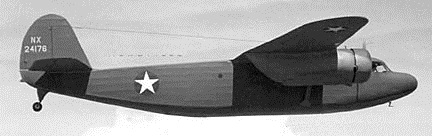
- The P260 demonstrator

General information
- Type: Military transport monoplane
- National origin: United States
- Manufacturer: Cessna Aircraft
- Number built: 2

History
- First flight: 1943

The Cessna C-106 Loadmaster (or Cessna P260) was a 1940s American twin-engined transport monoplane. Built of plywood it did not enter production due to a wartime shortage of material.

== Development ==
The C-106 Loadmaster was a twin-engined high-wing cantilever monoplane with a retractable tailwheel landing gear. It was powered by two 600 hp Pratt & Whitney R-1340 engines. Two company owned P260 demonstrators were built and given the military designation C-106 Loadmaster. An order for 500 was cancelled due to a shortage of plywood.

== Variants ==
C-106
Military designation for company owned P260 prototype with two R-1340-S3H1 engines.
C-106A
Military designation for company owned P260 prototype with two R-1340-AN-2 engines.

== Specifications ==
Data from

General characteristics

- Crew: 4
- Capacity: 2,440 lb
- Length: 51 ft 1 in (15.57 m)
- Wingspan: 64 ft 8 in (19.71 m)
- Empty weight: 9,800 lb (4,445 kg)
- Gross weight: 14,800 lb (6,713 kg)
- Powerplant: 2 × Pratt & Whitney R-1340 air-cooled radial piston engine, 600 hp (450 kW) each

Performance

- Maximum speed: 195 mph (314 km/h, 169 kn)

== See also ==
Related lists

- List of military aircraft of the United States
