= Chu Chia-Jen =

Chinese aviation engineer

Major General Chu Chia-Jen (Chinese: 朱家仁; pinyin: Zhū Jiārén; 1900 – July 11, 1985) was a Chinese aviation engineer in charge of manufacturing and development of military aircraft for the National Revolutionary Army in the 1930s to 1950s.

== Biography ==
Chu was born in 1900 in Hanshou County, Hunan, Qing China. After completing his secondary studies in Suzhou he studied aviation engineering at MIT from 1920 to 1926. After working at several aircraft manufacturers in the US, he returned to China in 1928. He worked at aviation factory near Shanghai Hongqiao Airport as a service technician, then joined the National Revolutionary Army and was in charge of an aircraft manufacturing facility in Yunnan. In 1930 he worked at the Nanjing Aeronautics Department.

Chu helped developed two experimental helicopters, the Hummingbird in the 1940s and CJC-3 in the 1950s. Neither aircraft was developed into a production model. He also developed the XP-0, one of the few Chinese-made aircraft of World War II.

Chu retired on December 31, 1962. He moved to the United States in 1980 and died at his home there on July 11, 1985.
