= CNNA HL-3 =

HL-3

General information
- Type: Civil trainer aircraft
- Manufacturer: CNNA
- Designer: René Vandeale
- Number built: 8

History
- First flight: 1942

The CNNA HL-3 was a civil trainer aircraft developed in Brazil in 1941.

== Development ==
CNNA had already benefited from the Brazilian government's decision to invest in a pilot training campaign and hoped that a dedicated trainer aircraft would attract even more sales. To that end, the HL-3 was proposed, and one prototype was constructed and flown. Unfortunately for the firm, this was not to be the case, and no official interest was shown.

The HL-3 was a two-place light aircraft powered by a 75 hp (56 kW) horizontally opposed four-cylinder piston engine.

An improved version with a more powerful 130 hp (97 kW) engine was designated the CNNA HL-4, but this didn't sell either.
