= Chyetverikov TA =

TA

General information
- Type: Transport Amphibian
- National origin: USSR
- Manufacturer: Chyetverikov
- Designer: Igor Vyacheslavovich Chyetverikov
- Number built: 3

History
- First flight: June 1947

The TA (Transportnaya Amfibiya – transport amphibian) was an amphibious transport designed and built in the USSR in 1945.

== Development ==
Chyetverikov designed and built the TA immediately after World War II, as an amphibious transport using Duralumin stressed skin construction. The capacious hull had seats for six to eight passengers and room for 1,000 kg of cargo as well as the electrically operated retractable undercarriage which retracted into the sides of the hull vertically. The untapered wing sat atop a short pylon braced by 'N' struts and had electrically operated slotted flaps and fixed floats, as well as the engine nacelles.

The first aircraft was completed in June 1947 and carried out sea and flight trials until the undercarriage collapsed on landing in November 1947. Repairs were carried out, but the Chyetverikov OKB was closed at the end of 1948 before flight trials could resume.

The second aircraft, designated TA-1, had semicircular wing-tips, retractable wing-tip floats and area increasing flaps, (similar to Fowler flaps), as well as other minor changes. Trials were completed and a report submitted by 20 June 1948 but production was not authorised. The third prototype was completed as the TAF (Transportnaya Amfibiya Fotografichyeskii – transport amphibian, photographic), for use as a reconnaissance or survey aircraft. The outer wings were tapered and had a larger span. The TAF was flown successfully late in 1948 but the OKB was closed before any further work could be carried out.

== Variants ==
- TA – The first prototype of the TA.
- TA-1 – The second prototype of the TA with retractable floats, area increasing flaps and other changes.
- TAF – The third of the TA family was a photographic (possibly survey) aircraft with tapered outer wings of greater span.

== Specifications (TA) ==
Data from Gunston, Bill. “The Osprey Encyclopaedia of Russian Aircraft 1875–1995”. London, Osprey. 1995. ISBN 1-85532-405-9

General characteristics

- Crew: 2
- Capacity: 6 – 8 + 1,000kg of cargo
- Length: 14 m (45 ft 11 in)
- Wingspan: 17.2 m (56 ft 5.25 in)
- Wing area: 43 m^{2} (463 sq ft)
- Empty weight: 4,658 kg (10,269 lb)
- Gross weight: 6,255 kg (13,790 lb)
- Powerplant: 2 × Shvetsov ASh-21 , 522.2 kW (700 hp) each

Performance

- Maximum speed: 328 km/h (204 mph, 177 kn)
- Range: 700 km (435 mi, 378 nmi)

== See also ==
Aircraft of comparable role, configuration, and era

- Grumman HU-16 Albatross
- Grumman G-73 Mallard

Related lists

- List of flying boats and floatplanes
