= Chyeranovskii BICh-20 =

Soviet research aircraft from 1937

BICh-20 Pionyer
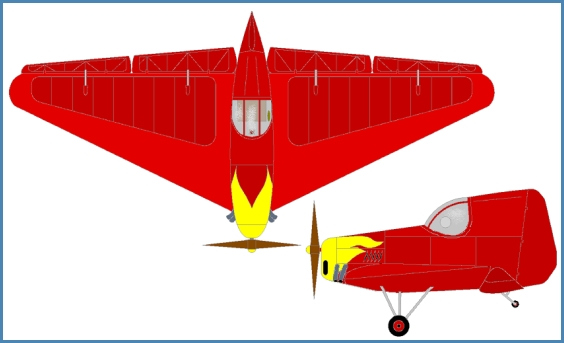

General information
- Type: Research
- National origin: USSR
- Manufacturer: Chyeranovskii
- Designer: Boris Ivanovich Chyeranovskii
- Number built: 1

History
- First flight: early 1938

The BICh-20 Pionyer was a tailless research aircraft designed and built in the USSR from 1937.

== Development ==
Chyeranovskii's smallest aircraft was the BICh-20 Pionyer, following broadly similar lines to its predecessors, the airframe was constructed of wood with a low aspect ratio tapered wing carrying suspended ailerons and flaps at the trailing edge. The engine and pilot were accommodated in the central nacelle with the cockpit canopy forming the leading edge of the broad chord fin and rudder.

Flight tests were carried out with ski undercarriage from early 1938, to investigate the turning performance of the tailless designs, particularly in flat horizontal flight without banking. Tests demonstrated turns up to 35 degrees while the wings remained horizontal. The initial 18 hp Blackburne Tomtit was replaced with a 20 hp Aubier-Dunne in the latter half of 1938.

== Specifications (BICh-20 Aubier-Dunne) ==
Data from Gunston, Bill. “The Osprey Encyclopaedia of Russian Aircraft 1875 – 1995”. London, Osprey. 1995. ISBN 1-85532-405-9

General characteristics

- Crew: 1
- Length: 3.56 m (11 ft 8.25 in)
- Wingspan: 6.9 m (22 ft 8 in)
- Wing area: 9.0 m^{2} (97 sq ft)
- Empty weight: 181 kg (399 lb)
- Gross weight: 287 kg (633 lb)
- Powerplant: 1 × Aubier-Dunne , 15 kW (20 hp)

Performance

- Maximum speed: 166 km/h (103 mph, 90 kn)
- Range: 320 km (199 mi, 173 nmi)
- Service ceiling: 4,000 m (13,000 ft)

== See also ==
Aircraft of comparable role, configuration, and era

- Horten H.II

Related lists

- List of aircraft
