= Chyeranovsky BICh-3 =

Soviet research aircraft from 1926

BICh-3
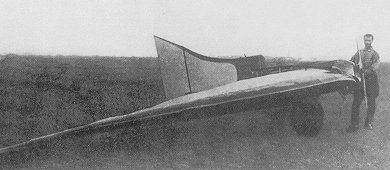

General information
- Type: Research Aircraft
- National origin: USSR
- Designer: Boris Ivanovich Cheranovsky (Черановский)
- Status: retired
- Number built: 1

History
- First flight: 1926
- Developed from: BICh-1

The BICh-3 (Russian: БИЧ-3) was a tailless research aircraft designed and built in the USSR in 1926.

== Development ==
After Boris Cheranovsky's first tailless flying wing gliders, the BICh-1 and BICh-2, he continued developing the concept with the BICh-3. The BICh-3 was built of wood with a parabolic wing having a straight trailing edge and a curved leading edge. The cockpit was faired into a large fin and rudder. The undercarriage consisted of a faired central mono-wheel with wing-tip skids. The BICh-3 was flown in Moscow in 1926. It was found to be unstable in initial tests leading to modifications that improved the handling sufficiently for it to be cleared as safe to fly.

== Specifications (BICh-3) ==
Data from Gunston, Bill (1995). The Osprey Encyclopaedia of Russian Aircraft 1875 – 1995. London: Osprey. ISBN 978-1855324053.

General characteristics

- Crew: 1
- Length: 3.5 m (11 ft 6 in)
- Wingspan: 9.5 m (31 ft 2 in)
- Wing area: 20 m^{2} (215 sq ft)
- Empty weight: 140 kg (309 lb)
- Gross weight: 230 kg (507 lb)
- Powerplant: 1 × Blackburne Tomtit , 13.4 kW (18 hp)

Performance

== See also ==
Aircraft of comparable role, configuration, and era

- Horten H.I
- Horten H.III
- Lippisch Delta I

Related lists

- List of aircraft
