= Chasle Tourbillon =

YC-12 Tourbillon
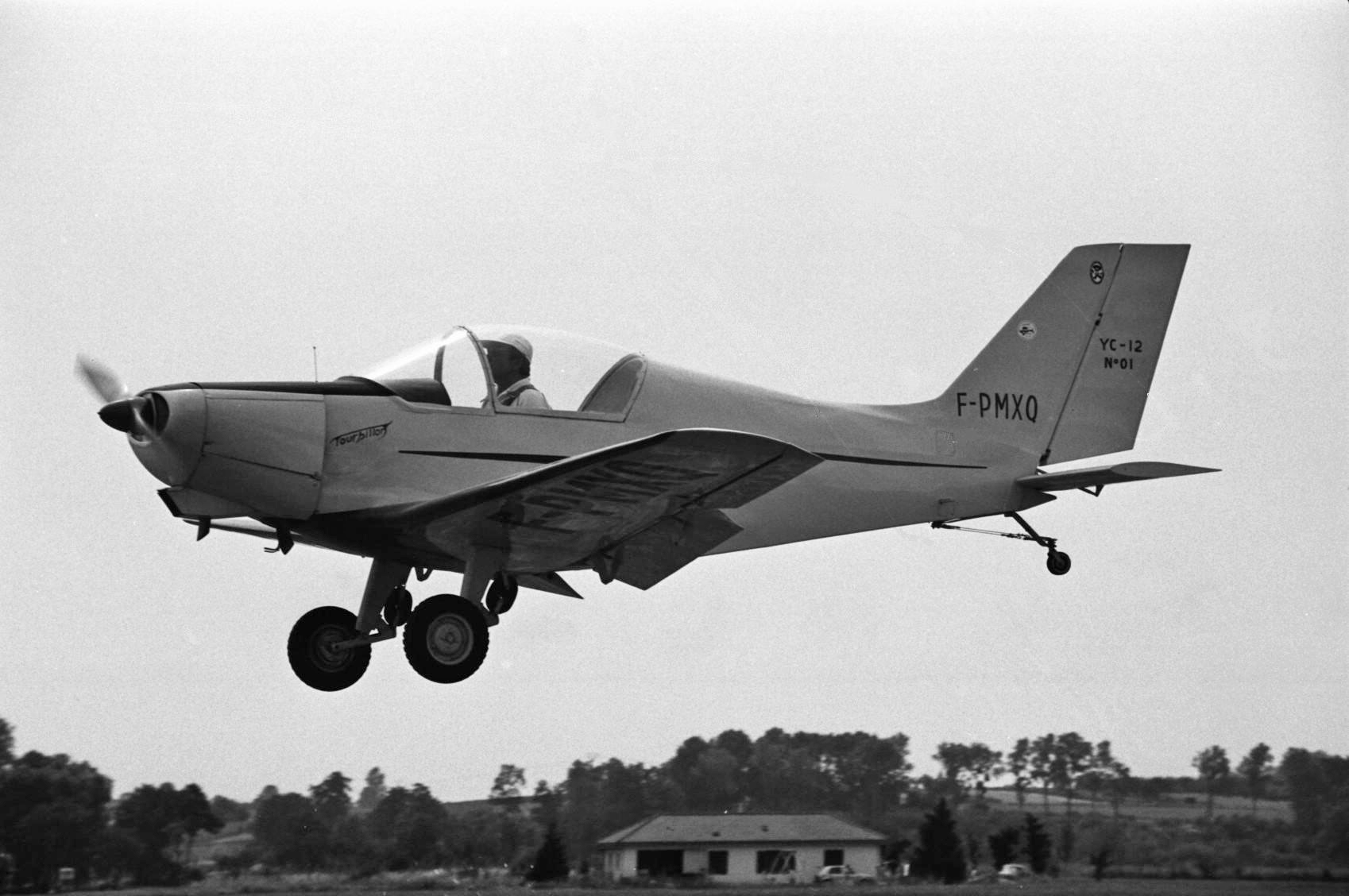

General information
- Type: Recreational aircraft
- Manufacturer: Homebuilt
- Designer: Yves Chasle
- Number built: 3

History
- First flight: 9 October 1965

The Chasle YC-12 Tourbillon ("Whirlwind") was a single-seat light sporting aircraft developed in France in the mid-1960s and marketed for homebuilding via plans. It was a low-wing cantilever monoplane of conventional configuration. As designed, it featured fixed tailwheel undercarriage, but it could also be fitted with fixed tricycle gear.

The Tourbillon flew for the first time on 9 October 1965. Though fifteen sets of plans were sold, only two other Tourbillons were built, both in the UK. The prototype remains on the French Civil register but the two UK aircraft are now deregistered. Their engine types are not recorded in the registration documents.

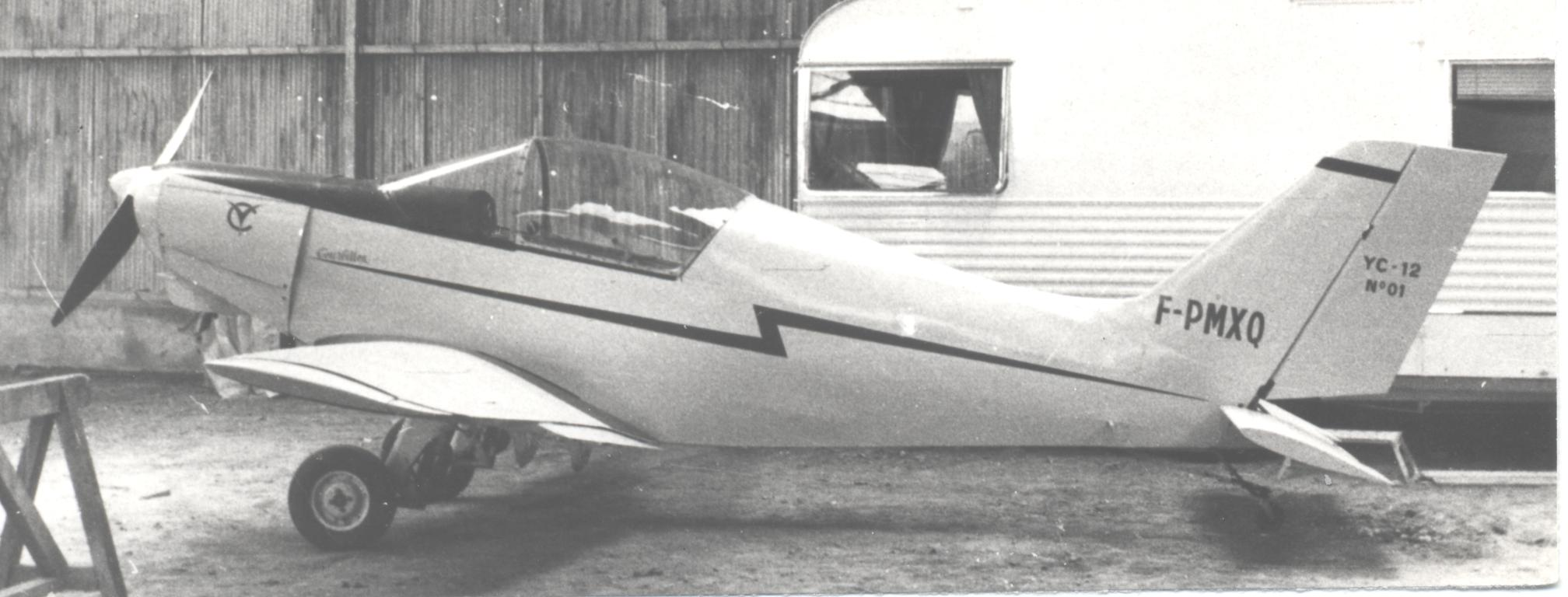
The prototype Chasle Tourbillon at Chavenay-Villepreux airfield near Paris in June 1967

== Variants ==
YC-12
prototype with Continental A65 engine
YC-121
similar to prototype with enlarged tailfin for limited certification
YC-122
similar to YC-121 but with Continental C90 engine
YC-123
similar to YC-121 but with Potez 4E-20b engine

== Specifications (typical YC-121) ==
Data from Jane's all the world's aircraft, 1975-76

General characteristics

- Crew: 1
- Length: 5.95 m (19 ft 6 in)
- Wingspan: 6.7 m (22 ft 0 in)
- Aspect ratio: 6
- Airfoil: NACA Srs.7
- Empty weight: 285 kg (628 lb)
- Max takeoff weight: 432 kg (952 lb) without radio
- Fuel capacity: 60.5 L (16.0 US gal; 13.3 imp gal)
- Powerplant: 1 × Continental A65 4-cyl air-cooled horizontally-opposed piston engine, 48 kW (65 hp) (typically)
- Propellers: 2-bladed EVRA fixed pitch wooden propeller, 1.75 m (5 ft 9 in) diameter

Performance

- Maximum speed: 235 km/h (146 mph, 127 kn) at sea level
- Cruise speed: 205 km/h (127 mph, 111 kn) at 70% power
- Stall speed: 75 km/h (47 mph, 40 kn)
- Range: 800 km (500 mi, 430 nmi)
- Rate of climb: 4.6 m/s (910 ft/min)
- Wing loading: 57.5 kg/m^{2} (11.8 lb/sq ft)
- Power/mass: 0.112 kW/kg (0.068 hp/lb
