= Boris Cheranovsky =

Soviet aircraft designer (1896–1960)

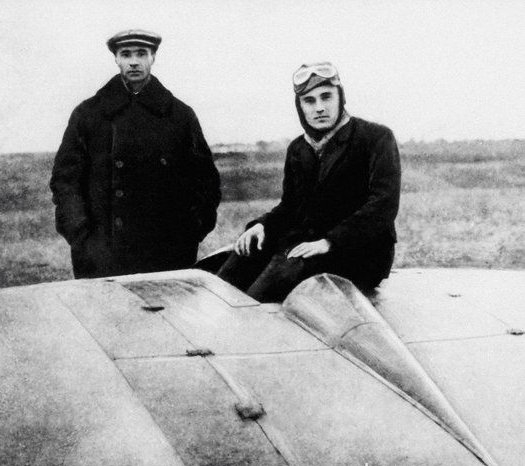
Boris Cheranovsky and Sergei Korolev with a BICh-8

Boris Ivanovich Cheranovsky (Russian: Борис Иванович Черановский, alternatively romanised as Chyeranovskii; 1 (13) July 1896 – 17 December 1960) was born in Ukraine. He was a Soviet aircraft designer, notable for creating flying wing aircraft with a characteristic tailless parabolic wing — the BICh-1 and BICh-2 gliders from 1924, and the powered BICh-3 later.

B. I. Cheranovsky was born on either 1 or 13 July 1896 in Pavlovychi, Ukraine. By profession he was a painter and sculptor, but in 1920 became interested in aviation. In 1921, for the first time, he proposed a "flying wing" aircraft. Colleagues did not believe the idea could be implemented, but within two years, Cheranovsky had completed the relevant work and presented prototypes of the technology. Tests at the airfield began on April 1, 1923, with the BICh-1. From 1924 to 1927 he studied at the Air Force Academy. Throughout his career he focused in the design and construction of flying-wing aircraft. For his services to aviation, Cheranovsky was awarded the Order of the Red Star. He died in Moscow, Soviet Union, on 17 December 1960.

== See also ==
- List of aerospace engineers
