= List of gliders (C) =

This is a list of gliders/sailplanes of the world, (this reference lists all gliders with references, where available) Note: Any aircraft can glide for a short time, but gliders are designed to glide for longer.

== C ==
=== Cacák-Šolc ===
(Antonín Cacák & Lubomír Šolc / Členové PO MLL Trutnov)

- Cacák-Šolc Hela-Zbodlina

=== Cacho-Ontiveros ===
(Emilio Gil Cacho & Felipe García Ontiveros / P.L.A.V.I.A. / Escuela de Especialistas, Málaga)

- Cacho-Ontiveros Gurripato I
- Cacho-Ontiveros Gurripato II

=== Cadet Aeronautics ===
(Alex Dawydoff / Cadet Aeronautics)

- Cadet UT-1

=== Calvel ===
(Jacques Calvel)

- Calvel Frelon

=== Cambier ===
- Cambier I

=== Cambilargiu ===
(Emanuele Cambilargiu)

- Cambilargiu Goliardia

=== Canard Aviation AG ===
see Farner

=== Cañete ===
(Captain of Engineers Antonio Cañete Heredia)

- Cañete Gaviota (Gull)

=== Canova ===
(Piana Canova)

- Canova FPC
- Canova PC-100
- Canova PC-500

=== CAP ===
(Companhia Aeronáutica Paulista)

- CAP Alcatraz

=== Caproni ===
(Società Italiana Caproni)

- Caproni TM.2

=== Caproni Vizzola ===
- Caproni Vizzola A-10 Calif
- Caproni Vizzola A-12 Calif
- Caproni Vizzola A-14 Calif
- Caproni Vizzola A-15 Calif
- Caproni Vizzola A-20 Calif
- Caproni Vizzola A-21 Calif
- Caproni Vizzola 1
- Caproni Vizzola 2
- Caproni Vizzola MF
- Caproni-Coanda 1908 glider

=== CARMAM ===
(Coopérative d'Approvisionnement et de Réparation de Matériel Aéronautique de Moulins)

- CARMAM M-100 S Mésange
- CARMAM M-200 Foehn
- CARMAM JP 15/34 Kit-Club (Jacquet/Pottier JP15/34)
- CARMAM JP 15/36 Aiglon (Jacquet/Pottier JP15/36)
- CARMAM JP 15-38 (Jacquet/Pottier JP15/38)
- CARMAM C.38
- CARMAM C.40

=== Carnegie Tech ===
- Carnegie Tech Flying Anvil

=== Cascade ===
(Cascade Ultralights Inc. / Vitold Kasperski / Steve Grossruck)

- Cascade Kasperwing I-80

=== Cases ===
(Francisco Cases Masia)

- Cases Libel-lula

=== Castel ===
(Robert Castello)

- Castel C.24
- Castel C.24 Casoar
- Castel C.24S
- Castel C.242
- Castel C.25S
- Castel C.30 Moustic
- Castel C.30S
- Castel C.301S Ailette
- Castel C.3010
- Castel C.31P Aigrette
- Castel C.310P
- Castel C.311P
- Castel C.32
- Castel C.34 Condor
- Castel C.36
- Castel C.38
- Castel S.D.
- Castel Yanapour II

=== Castel-Mauboussin ===
- Castel-Mauboussin CM.6 Adour
- Castel-Mauboussin CM.7
- Castel-Mauboussin CM.8 Acro
- Castel-Mauboussin CM.8/13
- Castel-Mauboussin CM.8/13 Sylphe démotorisé
- Castel-Mauboussin CM.08R13 Cyclone
- Castel-Mauboussin CM.08R13 Sylphe II
- Castel-Mauboussin CM.08R13 Sylphe III
- Castel-Mauboussin CM.08R9.8 Cyclope
- Castel-Mauboussin CM.8/15
- Castel-Mauboussin CM.10
- Castel-Mauboussin CM.17
- Castel-Mauboussin CM.24
- Castel-Mauboussin CM.71
- Castel-Mauboussin CM-88 Gémeaux
- Castel-Mauboussin CM-88R Gémeaux V
- Castel-Mauboussin Jalon

=== CAT ===
(Costruzioni Aeronautiche Taliedo)

- CAT 15
- CAT 20
- CAT 28
- CAT 28BP
- CAT TM-2

=== CAU ===
(Club Aéronautique Universitaire)

- CAU Frelon

=== Caudron ===
(Société des avions Caudron)

- Caudron LEI
- Caudron C.800
- Caudron C.801
- Caudron C.810
- Caudron C.811
- Caudron C.815

=== Caux ===
(Jules Caux)

- Caux 1922 glider

=== Cayley ===
(George Cayley)

- Cayley 1799 glider
- Cayley 1849 glider
- Cayley 1853 glider

=== CEA ===
(Escola de Engenharia da Universidade Federal de Minas Gerais – School of Engineering at the Federal University of Minas Gerais / Centro de Estudos Aeronáuticos da UFMG – Aeronautical Studies Centre UFMG)

- CEA 101 CB.1 Gaivota
- CEA 102 CB.2 Minuano

=== Celair ===
(Celair Manufacturing and Export / Peter Cellier & François Jordan)

- Celair GA-1 Celstar

=== Cener-Slanovec ===
(Dušan Cener & Marjan Slanovec)

- Cener-Slanovec KB-2 Udarnik Dušan Cener & Marjan Slanovec

=== Centrair ===
- Centrair 101 Pegase
- Centrair C201 Marianne
- Centrair SNC-34 Alliance

=== CERVA ===
(Consortium Europeén de Réalisation et de Ventes d'Avions (CERVA))

- CERVA CE-75 Silene
- CERVA CE-78 Silene

=== Cessna ===
(Clyde Cessna)

- Cessna CG-2

=== CGA ===
(Club Genevois d'Aviation)

- CGA Vol-au-Vent

=== Champion ===
(Ken Champion)

- Champion Freedom Falcon

=== Chanute ===
(Octave Chanute)

- Chanute 1896 glider
- Chanute 1902 glider
- Chanute 1904 glider
- Chanute-Voisin 1907 glider
- Chanute Katydid
- Chanute Quadriplan
- Chanute-Herring 1896 glider
- Chanute-Huffaker 1901 glider

=== Chapeaux ===
(Émile Chapeaux)

- Chapeaux 1922 glider
- Chapeaux CH-10
- Chapeaux CH-19
- Chapeaux CH-19C
- Chapeaux CH-20
- Chapeaux CH-21
- Chapeaux CH-23
- Chapeaux CH-46
- Chapeaux CH-56
- Chapeaux CX-19 Hirondelle
- Chapeaux CX-44-2
- Chapeaux-Durand CXD-18 Émile Chapeaux & Édouard Durand
- Chapeaux EC-19
- Chapeaux Le Moniteur
- Chapeaux VSBC Le Vautour Oricou
- Chapeaux Monoplan Portatif

=== Chard ===
(Keith Chard)

- Chard Osprey

=== Chardon ===
(Francis Chardon)

- Chardon Monoplan 1922

=== Chase ===
(Chase Aircraft Company)

- Chase MS.1
- Chase MS.7
- Chase XCG-14
- Chase XCG-18
- Chase XCG-20

=== Chase-Sisley ===
(Robert Chase & Sisley)

- Chase-Sisley C100-S

=== Chilton ===
(Chilton Aircraft Ltd.)

- Chilton Cavalier
- Chilton Olympia

=== Chinese gliders ===
see List of Chinese gliders

=== Chlup ===
(Jaromír Chlup / Dílny PO MLL Olomouc)

- Chlup CH-2 Duha I
- Chlup CH-2 Duha II

=== Christopher ===
- Christopher AG-1

=== Chrzanowski ===
(Chrzanowski Secondary School)

- Chrzanowski 1912 glider
- Chrzanowski School Glider

=== Chrzanowskiego ===
- Chrzanowskiego 1912 glider

=== Chyeranovskii ===
(Boris Ivanovitch Chyeranovskii)

- Chyeranovskii BICh-1 Parabola
- Chyeranovskii BICh-02 Parabola (AVF-15)
- Chyeranovskii BICh-03
- Chyeranovskii BICh-08 Treugolnik
- Chyeranovskii BICh-09 Gnome
- Chyeranovskii BICh-11
- Chyeranovskii BICh-12
- Chyeranovskii BICh-12 Parabola
- Chyeranovskii BICh-13
- Chyeranovskii BICh-13 Triangle
- Chyeranovskii BICh-14
- Chyeranovskii BICh-18 Human-powered ornithopter also flown as a glider with wings locked
- Chyeranovskii BICh-22

=== Chyliński ===
(Tadeusz Chyliński)

- Chyliński HWL Pegaz

=== Ciani ===
(Edgardo Ciani / SSVV – Sezioni Sperimentale di Volo a Vela Milano)

- Ciani EC 37/53 Spillo
- Ciani EC 38/56 Urendo
- Ciani EC 39/59 Uribel
- Ciani EC 40/62 Eventuale
- Ciani EC 41/64 Crib (Cribbio?)

=== Cijan ===
(Boris Cijan)

- Cijan BC-1 Galeb Boris Cijan / Letov
- Cijan BS-2 Galeb II
- Cijan BC-6 KOBAC: Yugoslav two-seater trainer for rough fields 1953 - Boris Cijan
- Cijan Orel Boris Cijan / Letov
- Cijan-Landsberg Skakavac Boris Cijan / Letov
- Cijan-Obad Orao IIC Boris Cijan / Letov
- Cijan-Obad Orao Boris Cijan / Letov
- Cijan-Obad Orao II (Eagle II)
- Cijan-Obad Orao IIC (Eagle IIC)
- Cijan-Stanko Meteor 57 – Ikarus Avijaticarski – Boris Cijan & Obad Stanko
- Cijan-Stanko Meteor 60 – Ikarus Avijaticarski – Boris Cijan & Obad Stanko

=== Civil Aviation Department of India ===
(Ministry of Civil Aviation (India) – Civil Aviation Department)

- Civil Aviation Department ATS-1 Ardhra
- Civil Aviation Department HS-1 Mrigasheer
- Civil Aviation Department HS-2 Mrigasheer
- Civil Aviation Department ITG-3
- Civil Aviation Department KS-1 Kartik
- Civil Aviation Department KS-2 Kartik
- Civil Aviation Department MG-1
- Civil Aviation Department Revathi
- Civil Aviation Department RG-1 Rohini
- Civil Aviation Department TS-2 Ashvini
- Civil Aviation Department TS-3 Ashvini
- Civil Aviation Department TS-4 Ashvini II
- Civil Aviation Department BS-1 Bharani

=== Clarke ===
(T W K Clarke & Co.)

- Clarke 1936 primary
- Clarke 1910 glider
- Clarke Popular
- Clarke-Chanute
- Clarke-Wright 1909 glider

=== Clarkson ===
(F. Clarkson)

- Clarkson 1930 glider

=== Clavé ===
- Clavé Goéland

=== Clément ===
(P. Clément)

- Clément 1909 glider

=== Clément ===
(Louis Clément)

- Clément Triplan

=== Cloudcraft ===
(Cloudcraft Glider Co / Roger S. Dickson)

- Cloudcraft Dickson Primary
- Cloudcraft Junior
- Cloudcraft Phantom

=== Cody ===
(Samuel F.Cody)

- Cody n°1 glider

=== Colditz ===
(Colditz Prisoners)

- Colditz Cock

=== Collard-Piel ===
- Collard-Piel Compact

=== Corazzo ===
(Aldo Corazza)

- Corazza 1904 glider
- Corazza 1907 glider
- Corazza Aerocicloplano

=== Cordas ===
(A.C. Cordas)

- Cordas SCS-1

=== Cornelius ===
(1930: (George Wilbur) Cornelius Aircraft Co, Glendale CA, c.1935: Van Nuys CA, c.1940: Dayton OH. 1941: Cornelius-Hoepli Co.)

- Cornelius XFG-1
- Cornelius XBG-3

=== Cosandey ===
(Louis Cosandy & Alain Rocheblaye)

- Cosandey Pou Planeur
- Cosandy-Rocheblaye Pou P AR-1

=== Costǎchescu ===
(Traian Costǎchescu)

- Costǎchescu CT-2

=== Coupet-Guerchais ===
- Coupet-Guerchais glider

=== Cousin ===
(Joseph Cousin)

- Cousin 1909 glider
- Cousin Voilier

=== Coward ===
(Ken Coward)

- Coward Pacific D-8

=== CPV ===
(Centro Politecnico del Volo)

- CPV-1 Arlecchino

=== Cramlington ===
(Cramlington Aircraft Ltd.)

- Cramlington Cramcraft

=== Crown City ===
(Crown City Glider Club)

- Crown City Screaming Wiener

=== Cukurs ===
(Herberts Cukurs)

- Cukurs C-4 – Herberts Cukurs

=== Culver ===
(Irvin Culver)

- Culver Dingbat
- Culver Li'l Dogie
- Culver Rigid Midget
- Culver Screaming Wiener

=== Curtiss ===
(Glenn Curtiss)

- Curtiss Flying Boat glider

=== CVT ===
(Centro di Volo a Vela del Politecnico di Torino)

- CVT-1 Zigolo
- CVT-2 Veltro
- CVT-4 Strale
- CVT M-100
- CVT M-200
- CVT M-300

=== CVV ===
(Centro Studi ad Ezperienze per il Volo a Vela)

- CVV 1 Pinguino
- CVV 2 Asiago
- CVV 3 Arcore
- CVV 4 Pellicano
- CVV 5 Papero
- CVV 6 Canguro
- CVV 7 Pinocchio
- CVV 8 Linate - 1945 unbuilt project
- CVV 8 Bonaventura

=== CYPA ===
(Construcciones y Proyectos Aeronáuticos / Enrique CORBELLA, Francisco ARRANZ MONASTERIO & Miguel GUINEA)

- CYPA-14
- CYPA-19

=== Cywiński ===
- Cywiński Lublin I – First Polish Glider Contest August 1923
- Cywiński Lublin II – First Polish Glider Contest August 1923

=== Czarnecki ===
- Czarnecki-Wroński Ikar (Jan Czarnecki & Kazimierz WRÓNSKI)
- Czarnecki-Jasiński Czajka (Jan Czarnecki & Mieczysław JASIŃSKI)

=== Czechowski ===
(J. Czechowski)

- Czechowski Śpiesz się powoli (hasten slowly) No.11 – Second Polish Glider Contest 17 May – 15 June 1925

=== Czerwiński ===
(Wacław Czerwiński)

- Czerwiński CW I
- Czerwiński CW II
- Czerwiński CW III
- Czerwiński CW IV
- Czerwiński CW 5 bis
- Czerwiński CW 7
- Czerwiński CW 8
- Czerwiński and Jaworski CWJ
- Czerwiński PWS-101
- Czerwiński PWS-102 Rekin
- Czerwiński PWS-103
- Czerwiński WWS-1 Salamandra
- Czerwiński Sparrow – close copy of the W.W.S.1 Salamandra – de Havilland Aircraft Canada
- Czerwiński Robin – modified Sparrow – de Havilland Aircraft Canada
- Czerwiński WWS-2 Żaba
- Czerwiński WWS-3 Delfin
- Czerwiński-Jaworski ITS-II
- Czerwiński-Shenstone Harbinger – Beverley Shenstone and Waclaw Czerwiński
- Czerwiński-Shenstone UTG-1 Loudon – Étudiants de L'Université de Toronto

=== Czerwiński ===
(Sergiusz Czerwiński - no relation to Wacław Czerwiński)

- Czerwiński 1 (1911)
- Czerwiński 2 (1927)

=== Cycloplane ===
(Cycloplane Co Ltd )

- Cycloplane A-1
- Cycloplane C-1
- Cycloplane C-2
