= CW8 =

CW8 or CW 8 may refer to:

== U.S. television stations affiliated with The CW ==
=== Current ===
- KAIT-DT3 in Jonesboro, Arkansas
- KFMB-DT2 in San Diego, California
- KIFI-DT3 in Idaho Falls, Idaho
- KJCT-LP2 in Grand Junction, Colorado
- KJUD-DT2 in Juneau, Alaska
- KNOE-DT3 in Monroe, Louisiana
- KOLO-DT3 in Reno, Nevada
- KOMU-DT2 in Columbia, Missouri
- WAGM-DT3 in Presque Isle, Maine
- WISH-TV in Indianapolis, Indiana

=== Former ===
- KPAX-DT2 in Missoula, Montana (2006–2023)

== Other use ==
- CW8, a CW postcode area for the post town of Northwich in Cheshire, UK
- Czerwiński CW 8, a training glider
