= Strale =

Strale may refer to:

- CVT4 Strale, an Italian experimental, high-performance glider completed in 1961
- Italian ship Strale, various Italian naval ships
- Straelen (Low Rhenish: Strale), a municipality in Cleves, North Rhine-Westphalia, Germany
