= M300 =

M300 or M-300 may refer to:

- CVT M-300, a glider aircraft
- GM M300 platform, a car platform
- HKL Class M300, a metro train class
- Zotye M300, a Chinese version of the Fiat Multipla
- DJI Matrice 300, a Chinese industrial drone
