= Aeromere =

Aeromere was an Italian aircraft manufacturing firm established at Trento in 1957 to build Aviamilano Super Falco aircraft for the US market and the Aeromere M-100 sailplane for Italy's gliding clubs. In 1964, it was purchased by the Laverda group.
