= CVV 3 Arcore =

Italian competition glider

Arcore

General information
- Type: Single seat glider
- National origin: Italy
- Manufacturer: Centro Volo a Vela, Milan (CVV)
- Designer: Ermenegildo Preti
- Number built: probably 1

History
- First flight: 1938
- Developed from: CVV 1 Pinguino

The CVV 3 Arcore was a single seat competition glider designed and built in Italy in the late 1930s, a development of the CVV 1 Pinguino. It participated in several national gliding competitions in the short period before the outbreak of World War II.

== Design and development ==
The Arcore was designed at the Centro Volo a Vela (CVV), or Experimental Soaring Centre, of the Royal Polytechnic of Milan by Gildo Preti. It was the third glider to be designed and built there and had a close resemblance to the first of them, the CVV 1 Pinguino. Both were wood and fabric single seat competition gliders, cantilever monoplanes with mid-mounted gull wings. The wings in particular were very similar in all respects apart from the Arcore's 400 mm (16 in) greater span. They were built around a single spar, with a plywood covered D-box ahead of it and fabric behind. In plan, they had a constant chord centre section, filling about a third of the span, and outer sections with taper on both leading and trailing edges ending in semi-elliptical tips. The centre section had positive dihedral but there was none on the outer panels. Ailerons occupied the whole of these outer panels, hinged parallel to the trailing edge. Short span airbrakes extended upwards only, mounted just behind the spar at the outer ends of the centre section.

Both models had ovoid cross section fuselages with ply skinning. In other respects the fuselages and empennages of the two types differed significantly, most obviously in the design of the cockpit and canopy and the related fuselage depth, as well as in the undercarriage. The upper edge of the fuselage of the Acore was straight and at about the height of the wing tips, higher than that of the earlier aircraft, enabling the fuselage top, teardrop shaped canopy of the Pinguino to be replaced by one with an upper line co-linear with that of the fuselage. The two models shared a rather upright windscreen, halfway between the nose and the wing leading edge. The Arcore had a shorter landing ski than its predecessor, ending at a fixed, partly recessed monowheel assisted by a small tail bumper. As before, its horizontal tail was raised above the fuselage on a shallow step but the elevator area was reduced by taper and it carried a small trim tab. The narrow fin was shorter than before, which allowed a shorter, broader rudder to be horn balanced. The control surfaces were fabric covered, and the fixed surfaces ply skinned.

The Arcore first flew in 1938, in time to take part in the Italian National Gliding Competition that year. Only a few, possibly only one, were built; one source says four but pre-war civilian registers contain only the prototype, I-DICI, which is also the only Arcore in the official record.

== Operational history ==
The Arcore competed at two Italian National Gliding Competitions, that of 1939 as well as 1938, both held at Asiago. It also took part in at least one competition held in Germany.

== Specifications ==
Data from Italian Vintage Sailplanes

General characteristics

- Crew: One
- Length: 6.50 m (21 ft 4 in)
- Wingspan: 15.70 m (51 ft 6 in)
- Wing area: 14.45 m^{2} (155.5 sq ft)
- Aspect ratio: 16
- Airfoil: root: Göttingen 535; tip: NACA 23012
- Empty weight: 180 kg (397 lb)
- Gross weight: 260 kg (573 lb)

Performance

- Maximum glide ratio: estimated 24:1
- Rate of sink: 0.7 m/s (140 ft/min) minimum
- Wing loading: 18.0 kg/m^{2} (3.7 lb/sq ft)
