= CVV 5 Papero =

Italian competition glider

Papero

General information
- Type: Single seat glider
- National origin: Italy
- Manufacturer: Centro Volo a Vela, Milan (CVV)
- Designer: Ermenegildo Preti
- Number built: 4

History
- First flight: 1939
- Developed from: CVV 4 Pellicano

The CVV 5 Papero (English: Gosling) was a single seat competition glider designed and built in Italy in the late 1930s, a development of the CVV 4 Pellicano.

== Design and development ==
The Papero was designed at the Centro Volo a Vela (CVV), or Experimental Soaring Centre, of the Royal Polytechnic of Milan by Gildo Preti, the fourth and last in a series of gull winged, single seat, competition gliders. Built in 1939, it had much in common with the CVV 4 Pellicano, first flown earlier in that year. This is particularly so of the wings, which share dimension, layout and plan. Each wing was double straight tapered, with semi-elliptical tips and built around a single spar with a ply covered torsion D-box ahead of it and fabric behind. The centre section panels had strong dihedral but the outer wing none, forming the gull wing. There were ailerons occupying all the outer panel trailing edges and airbrakes at mid chord at the outer ends of the centre section which extended both above and below the wing. These limited the Papero to speeds less than its 180 km/h (112 mph) design limit.

Whilst both aircraft had ovoid section, ply covered fuselages, that of the Papero was improved, particularly ahead of the wings, by seating the pilot lower and reducing the cross section. He sat under a canopy, which, together with a small section of fuselage, was removed for access. The undercarriage was improved by lightening the skid and including a fixed, semi-recessed monowheel. Both models had a horizontal tail mounted on a shallow pedestal slightly above the upper fuselage and forward of the rudder hinge, though the elevators of the Papero were reshaped and carried a small trim tab. Both had narrow fins and broad, curved rudders but that of the Papero was unbalanced. The rear control surfaces were fabric covered.

The Papero prototype, I-MCVV, first flew in 1939. Three more were built by Costruzione Aeronautiche Taliedo. It had a slightly better glide angle than the Pellicano and competitive with the best sailplanes of its time, even with those of greater span.

== Operational history ==
At least one Papero flew for a time with a Matricola Militare serial.

== Specifications ==
Data from Italian Vintage Sailplanes

General characteristics

- Crew: One
- Length: 6.50 m (21 ft 4 in)
- Wingspan: 15.00 m (49 ft 3 in)
- Wing area: 14.70 m^{2} (158.2 sq ft)
- Aspect ratio: 15.3
- Airfoil: root: NACA 2418; tip: NACA 0012
- Empty weight: 180 kg (397 lb)
- Gross weight: 270 kg (595 lb)

Performance

- Never exceed speed: 180 km/h (110 mph, 97 kn)
- Maximum glide ratio: estimated 25:1
- Rate of sink: 0.65 m/s (128 ft/min) minimum
- Wing loading: 18.40 kg/m^{2} (3.77 lb/sq ft)
