= CVT4 Strale =

Italian performance glider

GP1

General information
- Type: Competition glider
- Manufacturer: Soaring Centre of the Polytechnic of Turin (CVT)
- Designer: Alberto & Pietro Morelli
- Number built: 1

History
- First flight: July 1961
- Developed from: CVT2 Veltro

The CVT4 Strale (English: Arrow) was a one-off, experimental, high performance glider designed and built in Italy. Completed in 1961, it was a refined version of the earlier CVT2 Veltro.

== Design and development ==
The Strale was a refinement of the pioneering CVT2 Veltro of 1954. The Veltro went from design commencement to completion in eight months; the Strale, started in 1955, was not finished until July 1961, even though the two aircraft had much in common.

The main differences between the Veltro and the Strale were in the wing, even though these had a similar straight tapered plan and used the same laminar flow NACA airfoil sections. The Starle's wing was constructed, like that of the Veltro, around a forward main box spar and a lighter secondary spar aft but was in two rather than three parts. The outer span washout and the tip bodies were discarded. The span was increased by 1,080 mm (42.5 in), which raised the aspect ratio from 18 to 19.3. Each aileron of the Strale was shortened by 900 mm (35.4 in) and plywood covered, and the combined flaps/airbrakes of the Veltro were discarded, replaced by spoilers. These were similar to those used on the CVT M-100S: mounted immediately behind the main spar at about one third span, each set consisted of five plates that rotated about chordwise axes out of the wing, each plate projecting both above and below. The two sets rotated in opposite directions and proved to be very effective.

The Strale was a high wing rather than shoulder wing design, reducing aerodynamic interference over the upper surface. It had a slightly deeper cockpit and a single wheeled version of the Veltro's trailing arm, retractable undercarriage, the wheel with its single shock absorber now totally within the fuselage after retraction. The slender rear fuselages and low T-tails of the two gliders were very similar, though the dorsal fin added after flight testing to the Veltro was more smoothly faired into the fin of the Strale. The double slotted rudder was increased in area by about 11%, lowering its aspect ratio still further and making the overall fuselage length 130 mm (5.1 in) greater.

The Strale made its first flight in July 1961 and after some testing took part in the Italian National Gliding Competition in Perugia early that August. Like the Veltro, it was seen as an experimental aircraft and only one was built.

== Specifications ==
Data from The World's Sailplanes (1958) pp.152-5

General characteristics

- Crew: One
- Length: 7.03 m (23 ft 1 in)
- Wingspan: 16.1 m (52 ft 10 in)
- Wing area: 13.3 m^{2} (143 sq ft)
- Aspect ratio: 19.4
- Airfoil: NACA 64_{2}515 at root, 64_{1}512 at tip
- Empty weight: 190 kg (419 lb)
- Gross weight: 280 kg (617 lb)

Performance

- Maximum speed: 200 km/h (120 mph, 110 kn)
- Maximum glide ratio: estimated 32:1
- Wing loading: 21.0 kg/m^{2} (4.3 lb/sq ft)
