= W.W.S.3 Delfin =

WWS-3 Delphin
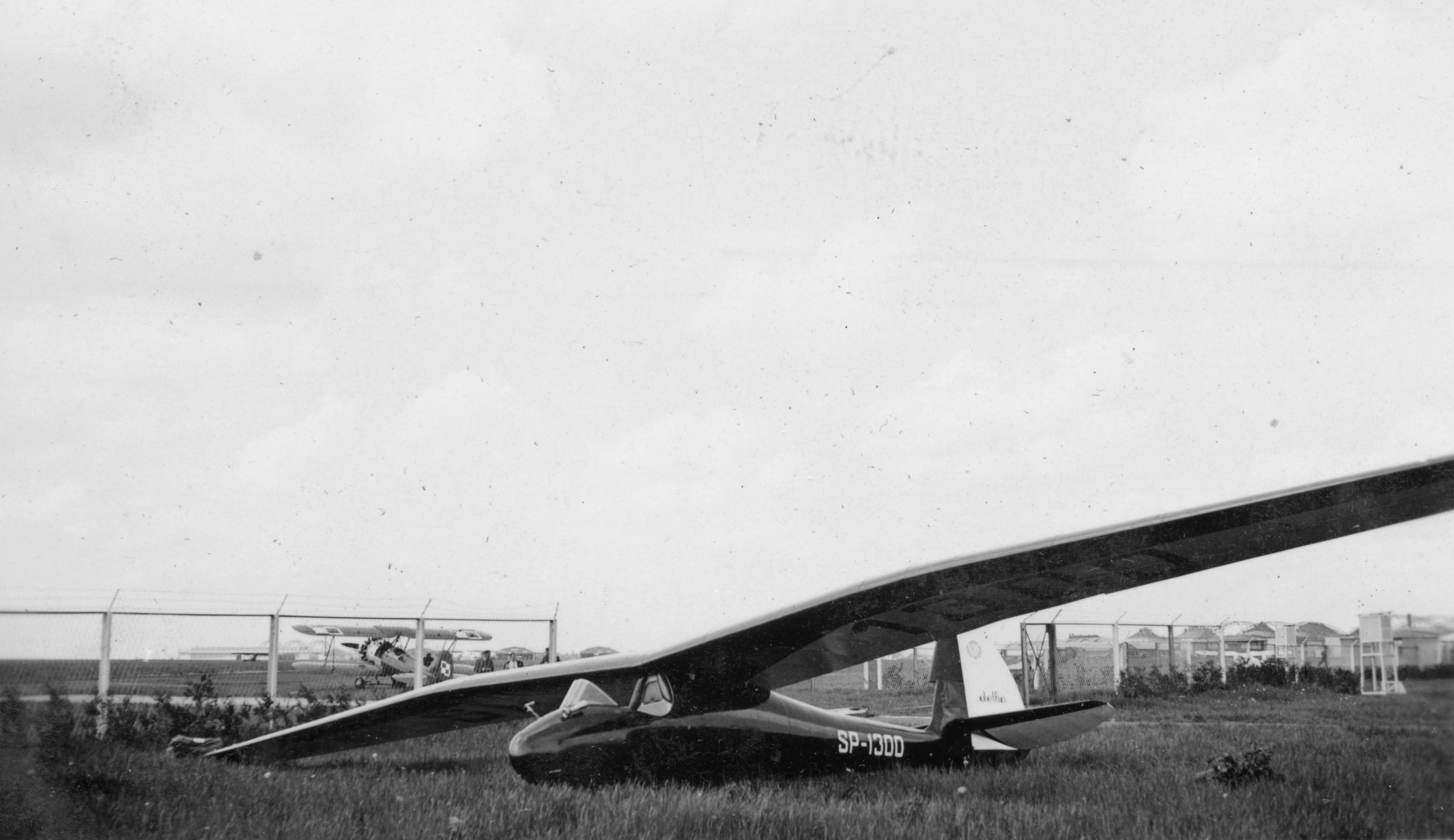

General information
- Type: Glider
- National origin: Poland
- Manufacturer: Wojskowych Warsztatów Szybowcowych
- Designer: Wacław Czerwiński
- Number built: ca 70

History
- First flight: Autumn 1936
- Developed from: Wacław Czerwiński & Władysław Jaworski CWJ-bis Skaut

The WWS-3 Delphin (Dolphin) was a single-seat glider designed and built in Poland from 1936.

== Development ==
To provide a higher performance glider, to complement the W.W.S.1 Salamandra and W.W.S.2 Żaba, Wacław Czerwiński designed an all wood glider with smooth lines derived from wind tunnel tests at the Lwów Technical University. With a stiff structure optimised for higher speeds the W.W.S.3 had pleasant flying characteristics. The first prototype was built with two alternative tailplanes, one conventional with separate elevator, the other an all-flying surface, both of which were evaluated in airworthiness trials at the I.B.T.L. (Instytut Badań Technicznych Lotnictwa – Institute of Aviation Technical Research) during 1937. Production aircraft were produced at W.W.S and at L.W.L.(Lwówskie Warsztaty Lotnicze – Lwów Aviation Workshops) with the all-flying tail for pitch control.

The cantilever gull wings were constructed as a divided pair, with diagonal supplementary spars and plywood skinned leading edge D torsion box. The fuselage was constructed as a semi-monocoque shell, with integral fin carrying the rudder and all-flying tailplane. A pneumatically sprung nose skid formed the undercarriage.

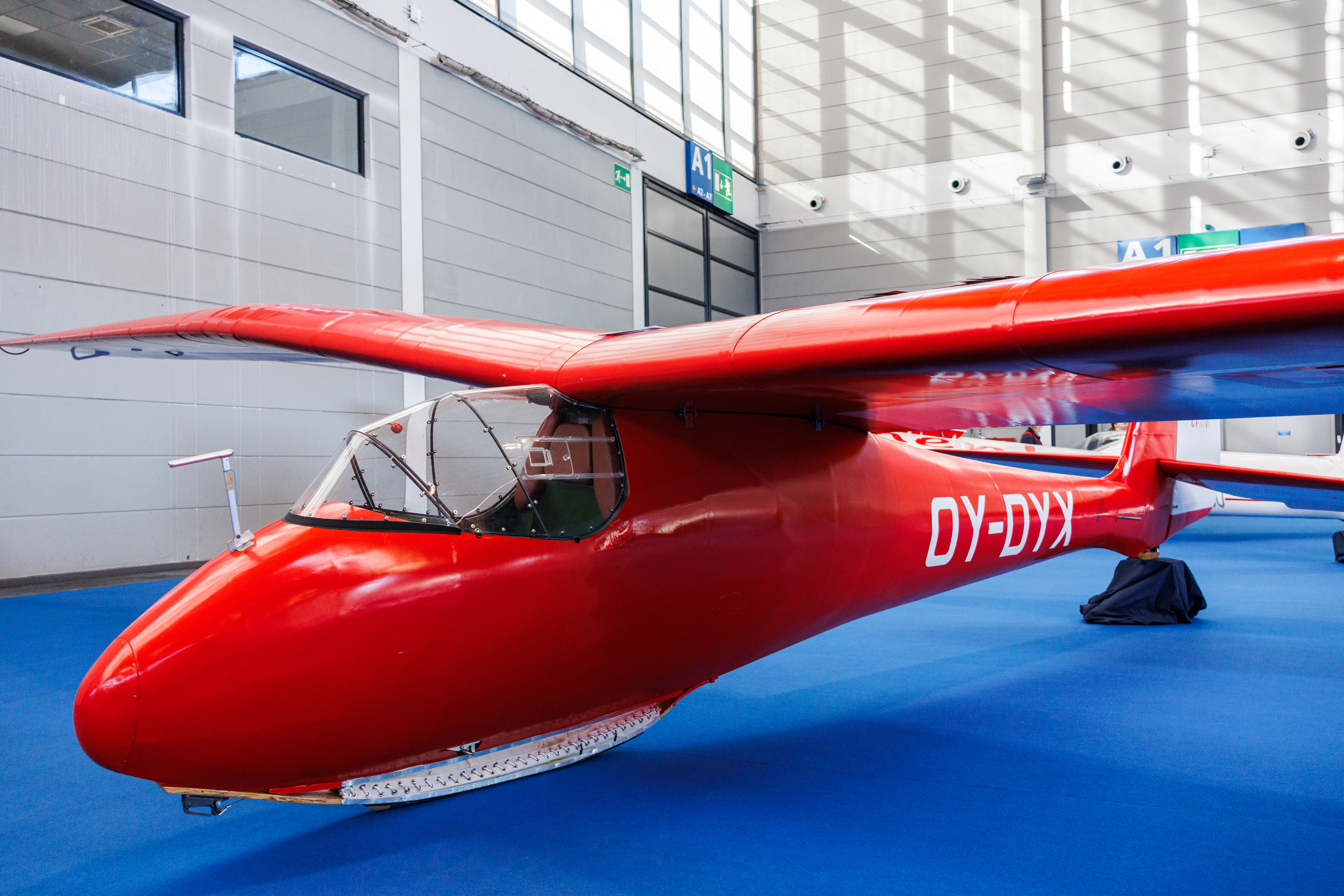

Production continued until the outbreak of World War II, with most aircraft being destroyed except for examples confiscated by the German and Soviet authorities. One example taken by German forces was left behind in Denmark at the end of the war, and refurbished for the Stamgruppen Gliding Club (regn OY-DYX), where it flew for several years.

== Specifications (WWS-3 Delphin) ==
Data from http://www.piotrp.de/SZYBOWCE/pwws3.htm

General characteristics

- Crew: 1
- Length: 6.97 m (22 ft 11 in)
- Wingspan: 16 m (52 ft 6 in)
- Height: 1.7 m (5 ft 7 in)
- Wing area: 20.15 m^{2} (217 sq ft)
- Aspect ratio: 12.7:1
- Empty weight: 135 kg (298 lb)
- Gross weight: 232 kg (511 lb)

Performance

- Maximum speed: 200 km/h (124 mph, 108 kn)
- Stall speed: 39 km/h (24 mph, 21 kn)
- g limits: +5.5 g
- Maximum glide ratio: 21.4 :1 at 52 km/h (28 kts / 32 mph)
- Rate of sink: 0.61 m/s (120 ft/min) at 45 km/h (24 kts/28 mph)

== See also ==
Aircraft of comparable role, configuration, and era

- Slingsby T.13 Petrel
