= Civil Aviation Department Kartik =

Kartik

General information
- Type: Single seat high performance glider
- National origin: India
- Manufacturer: Civil Aviation Department
- Designer: S. Ramamrithram
- Number built: 9

History
- First flight: 18 March 1963

The Civil Aviation Department Kartik was an Indian single seat competition glider first flown in 1963. It was built in small numbers and remained under development until 1975.

== Design and development ==
Several Civil Aviation Department aircraft were named after lunar related periods; Kartik (Sanskrit: कार्तिकः) is the eighth month of the Indian national calendar. The glider named after it was one of at least five designed by S. Ramamrithram at the Civil Aviation Department. It was a single seat, high performance machine, fairly conventional apart from the wing planform of the first variant, the KS-I Kartik. Rather than the usual taper, its 15 m (49 ft 3 in) span, high, cantilever wing had inner and outer rectangular panels of different chord, 200 mm (7.9 in) narrower outboard. This approximated taper and was simpler to build with fewer different sized ribs. The mid-wing joins were blended with short tapered sections of the trailing edge; the leading edges were straight. Overall there was 1° of forward sweep. The wing structure was wooden, consisting of a single main spar with plywood skinning forward from it around the leading edge to form a torsion resisting box, a secondary rear strut and diagonal drag struts at the wing roots. Fabric covering was used aft of the main spar. The wing was mounted with 1.50° of dihedral. It was fitted with ply covered, wood framed ailerons and had wooden air brakes which opened above and below at mid-chord.

The Kartik's fuselage was a ply skinned, wooden framed semi-monocoque with an aluminium nose cap. The cockpit was ahead of the wing leading edge with a removable perspex canopy. Oxygen was an option. Aft, the fuselage tapered gently to the tail surfaces which were straight tapered and square tipped. Its tailplane, mounted at the top of the fuselage, was positioned forward of the fin so the rudder, which reached down to the keel, only required a small cut-out for operation. The fin and the tailplane leading edge were ply covered, the remainder fabric. The starboard elevator carried a trim tab.

Ramamrithram provided the Kartik with similar landing gear to that of his earlier Bharani: a fixed monowheel without a brake, a rubber sprung, steel shod forward skid and a tail skid with tennis balls as a spring.

The KS-I first flew on 18 March 1963. It gained permission to fly in cloud and to perform aerobatic loops, stalls and spins. However, flight testing showed that the double rectangular wing was not a success and the third prototype, the KS-2 Kartik first flown on 4 May 1965, had instead a wing with conventional straight taper. Area and span remained the same, though the ailerons were given slots and the airbrake area increased. A wheel brake was added and maximum take-off weight increased by about 7%. Other changes were minor; there was a 100 mm (3.9 in) increase in length and a lowering of the cockpit, now fitted with a rear hinged canopy and with a better forward view. In all seven Kartik IIs were built, the last at the end of 1975. This final example had slotted flaps instead of airbrakes.

== Operational history ==
At the first Indian national gliding rally in 1967 the Kartik set a national speed record over a 200 km (124 mi) triangular course.

== Variants ==
KS-I Kartik
First two prototypes, first flown 18 March 1963. Double rectangle wing.
KS-II Kartik
First flown 4 May 1965. Straight tapered wing. Seven built.

== Specifications (KS-II Kartik) ==
Data from Jane's All the World's Aircraft 1974/5

General characteristics

- Crew: One
- Length: 7.37 m (24 ft 2 in)
- Wingspan: 15.00 m (49 ft 3 in)
- Height: 2.26 m (7 ft 5 in)
- Wing area: 13.54 m^{2} (145.7 sq ft)
- Aspect ratio: 16.6
- Airfoil: NACA 64_{3}618
- Empty weight: 210 kg (463 lb)
- Max takeoff weight: 320 kg (705 lb)
- Maximum wing loading: 23.63 kg/m^{2} (4.86 lb/sqft)

Performance

- Maximum speed: 200 km/h (120 mph, 110 kn) in smooth air; in rough air 87 mph; 76 kn (140 km/h). All performance figures at maximum take-off weight.
- Stall speed: 58 km/h (36 mph, 31 kn)
- Maximum glide ratio: 31 best, at 47 mph; 40 kn (75 km/h)
- Rate of sink: 0.6 m/s (120 ft/min) minimum, at 40 mph; 35 kn (65 km/h)
