= CARMAM 15-38 =

French single seat glider, 1979

15-38

General information
- Type: Standard Class sailplane
- Manufacturer: CARMAM

History
- First flight: 17 June 1979

The CARMAM 15-38 was a French sailplane built in the late 1970s. It utilised the wing design of the CARMAM Aiglon but had an all-new fuselage. Like the Aiglon, this was of fibreglass construction throughout. The 15-38 was easily distinguished from its predecessor by a more streamlined nose and a T-tail.

== Specifications ==
General characteristics

- Crew: One pilot
- Length: 6.70 m (22 ft 0 in)
- Wingspan: 15.00 m (49 ft 3 in)
- Height: 1.45 m (4 ft 9 in)
- Wing area: 11.0 m^{2} (118 sq ft)
- Aspect ratio: 20.6
- Empty weight: 230 kg (507 lb)
- Gross weight: 440 kg (970 lb)

Performance

- Maximum speed: 219 km/h (136 mph, 118 kn)
- Maximum glide ratio: 38:1
- Rate of sink: 0.60 m/s (118 ft/min)
