= CVT1 Zigolo =

Italian training glider

General information
- Type: Single-seat medium performance training glider
- National origin: Italy
- Manufacturer: Soaring Centre of the Polytechnic of Turin (CVT)
- Designer: Alberto & Piero Morelli
- Number built: 1

History
- First flight: 7 April 1954

The CVT1 Zigilo (English: Bunting) was a single-seat, 12-metre-span (39 ft) Italian training glider designed and built in Italy in the 1950s. Only one was completed.

== Design and development ==
The Zigolo was the first aircraft built at the Centro di Volo a Vela del Politechnico Torino, the Soaring Centre of the Polytechnic of Turin. Designed by the Morelli brothers and intended as a low cost, easy to fly, training glider of modest performance, it was completed in October 1953 after sixteen months' work.

The Zigolo was a cantilever high-wing monoplane with a single-spar, single-piece wing, plywood-covered from the front spar around the leading edge to form a torsion-resistant D-box and mounted on top of the fuselage with 2° of dihedral. Behind the spar the wing was fabric-covered. In plan the central section was rectangular and the outer parts tapered slightly to rounded tips. Frise ailerons filled more than half the span. Originally there were no wing mounted airbrakes or spoilers; rather, the Zigolo had door-type, underwing fuselage-mounted airbrakes but these failed on the first flight and were replaced by conventional spoilers.

Its fuselage was decahedral in cross-section, shaped by longerons over formers with ply covering. The single-seat cockpit was immediately ahead of the wing, the upper rear of its one-piece perspex canopy blending into the leading edge. The fuselage tapered aft to a conventional tail, where a constant-chord, round-tipped tailplane and elevator was mounted on top of the fuselage, forward of the rudder hinge. The fin and rudder were straight-edged with rounded tip and heel, the rudder broad and extending down to the keel. Both tail control surfaces were unbalanced. The Zigolo had a short wooden landing skid with rubber shock absorbers which ran from the nose to under the leading edge, but the main gear was a fixed monowheel at about one-third chord. There was also a small tail bumper.

The Zigolo made its first flight on 7 April 1954 at the Aeritalia Airport, Turin, flown by Adriano Mantelli. It later flew in Venice.

== Specifications ==
Data from The World's Sailplanes (1958) pp.152–5

General characteristics

- Crew: One
- Length: 6.55 m (21 ft 6 in)
- Wingspan: 12.0 m (39 ft 4 in)
- Wing area: 14.0 m^{2} (151 sq ft)
- Aspect ratio: 10
- Airfoil: NACA 4415
- Empty weight: 151 kg (333 lb)
- Max takeoff weight: 250 kg (551 lb)

Performance

- Maximum speed: 180 km/h (110 mph, 97 kn) placard
- Stall speed: 45 km/h (28 mph, 24 kn)
- Maximum glide ratio: best 23:1
- Rate of sink: 0.75 m/s (148 ft/min) minimum, at 60 km/h (37 mph)
- Wing loading: 17.8 kg/m^{2} (3.6 lb/sq ft)
