= Czerwiński CW 8 =

CW 8
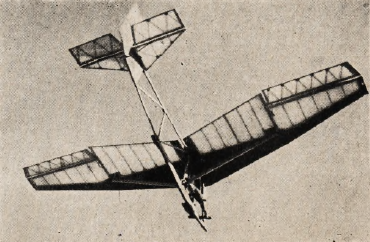

General information
- Type: Basic training glider
- National origin: Poland
- Manufacturer: ZASPL
- Designer: Wacław Czerwiński
- Number built: 30-40

History
- First flight: late 1934 or early 1935

The Czerwiński CW 8 was a mid-1930s Polish open-frame basic training glider. Its design was advanced and its price low, but its stalling characteristics were too dangerous for beginners, so the thirty-plus examples completed were rapidly withdrawn from use. Two were subsequently modified, one with greater span and the other with a small engine.

== Design and development ==
The CW 8 was designed in 1934 to build on the success of the CWJ, an open-frame basic training glider. It had the same layout but a rigorous effort to simplify the structure and to use standard components resulted in a very low cost. The CW 8 was the last of Czerwiński's designs to be built in the workshops of ZASPL, the Aviation Association of students of the Lwów Technical University.

The single spar wing of the CW 8 was in two parts, each with two distinct panels. ts inner panels were parallelograms in plan, swept at about 7°. The outer panels were trapezoidal, with more than 7° leading edge sweep but with unswept trailing edges which carried broad chord ailerons. It was plywood-covered ahead of the main spar inboard and to the angled ancillary spar further out, with fabric aft. The wing was mounted on top of the CW 8's open frame fuselage and braced on each side by a single, airfoil-section strut from the lower fuselage to the wing spar, assisted by wires.

The upper chord or longeron of the glider's open frame fuselage was horizontal in flight but the lower chord included a box which ran from the nose to behind the trailing edge, with an upward-sloping member aft. The upper and lower longerons were connected by two vertical and three oblique cross-members, truss fashion. The exposed pilot's seat was mounted on the box behind the foremost cross-member and under the wing at about mid-chord. A rubber disk-sprung landing skid was also attached to the box.

The empennage was similar to that of the CWJ, with a fabric covered, tube-braced, triangular plan tailplane mounted on top of the fuselage. It carried fabric covered elevators which were rectangular in plan apart from a cut-out for rudder movement. Part of the fin, with a vertical leading edge, filled the space between the upper and lower longerons but there was an upward, cropped triangular, extension. The fin carried a square-topped, balanced, rudder.

== Operational history ==
The date of its first flight is uncertain as sources give either autumn 1934 or early 1935. It was flown from Lwów-Skniłów, piloted by Franciszek Kotowski. Successful flight trials led to an order from LOPP for the CW 8bis, which had a larger rudder. Between thirty and forty were completed before it became obvious that it was easily stalled by inexperienced pilots and so was unsuitable as a basic trainer. It was therefore withdrawn from service.

The CW 8ter, a version with an increase in span, wing area and unladen weight of about 30% each was tested in 1935. Despite better performance, including a minimum sink speed of 0.9 m/s (180 ft/min) and a maximum glide ratio of 12.5, no further examples were built.

In late 1936 some student members of ZASPL began design work on a motorized version of the CW-8 which became known as the ZASPL CW 8S. It was powered by a 6.0 kW (8 hp) inverted, air-cooled, single cylinder engine named the JS4 and designed by one of the students, Jerzy Szablowski. This drove a two blade, wooden propeller and was mounted in tractor configuration in the wing leading edge, where the upper fuselage was strengthened around its mounting. The pilot's seat was enclosed in an open, ply nacelle. The CW 8S's dimensions were unchanged, though the empty weight rose to 102 kg (225 lb).

The sole example was first flown in 1937 and was used by ZAPL students. Its maximum speed was about 100 mph (160 km/h; 87 kn) and it had a range of about 100 km (62 mi; 54 nmi).

== Variants ==
CW 8
Prototype.
CW 8bis
Production version with enlarged rudder.
CW 8ter
30% increase in span, wing area and weight.
ZASPL CW 8S
One-off powered conversion with 6.0 kW (8 hp) JS-4 engine.

== Specifications (CW 8bis) ==
Data from samolotypolskie.pl

General characteristics

- Crew: One
- Length: 5.25 m (17 ft 3 in)
- Wingspan: 9.24 m (30 ft 4 in)
- Height: 2.27 m (7 ft 5 in)
- Wing area: 13.2 m^{2} (142 sq ft)
- Airfoil: Göttingen Gö 682
- Empty weight: 82 kg (181 lb)
- Gross weight: 157 kg (346 lb)

Performance

- Maximum glide ratio: 10.9 at 49 km/h (30 mph; 26 kn)
- Rate of sink: 1.4 m/s (280 ft/min) at 45 km/h (28 mph; 24 kn)
- Minimum speed:42 km/h (26 mph; 23 kn)
- Towing speed:73 km/h (45 mph; 39 kn)
