= CVT M-200 =

Two-seat glider aircraft

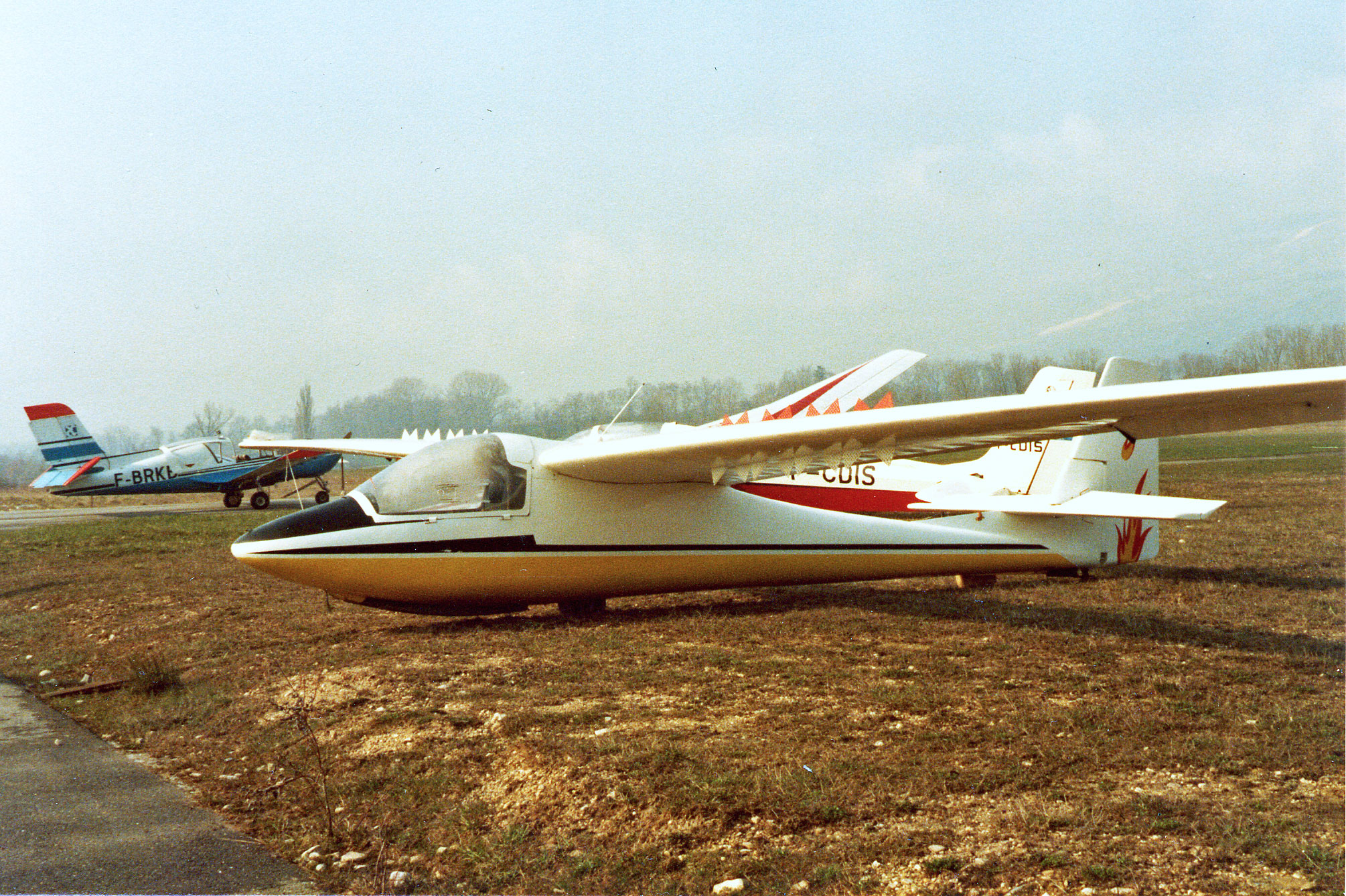

General information
- Type: Glider
- National origin: Italy
- Manufacturer: Centro di Volo a Vela
- Designer: Alberto & Piero Morelli
- Number built: 4 Italian + 59 French

History
- First flight: May 1964

The CVT M-200 was a two-seat glider that was designed in Italy and built in Italy and France from 1963.

== Development ==
Designed by Alberto and Piero Morelli, the M-200 was built by the Turin Gliding Centre (Centro di Volo a Vela – Turin) under contract with the Aero Club of Italy (Aero-club d'Italia). The M-200 is a two-seat glider with dual controls with generally similar layout to the single seat M-100 but with greater dimensions. Conventional wooden-frame structure and plywood skinning were used for the fuselage with a single-spar wing covered in plywood and fabric. Accommodation for two is provided in the staggered seat cockpit covered by a sideways hinging canopy. With relatively high performance for its day, the M-200 proved to be easy to fly both for early solo pilots and for advanced aerobatics.

The M-200 was also built in France by CARMAM as the M-200 Foehn.

== Specifications (M-200) ==
Data from Coates, Andrew. “Jane's World Sailplanes & Motor Gliders new edition”. London, Jane's. 1980. ISBN 0-7106-0017-8

General characteristics

- Crew: 1
- Capacity: 1 passenger
- Length: 7.6 m (24 ft 11.25 in)
- Wingspan: 18.15 m (59 ft 6.5 in)
- Wing area: 17.5 m^{2} (188.4 sq ft)
- Aspect ratio: 19:1
- Airfoil: NACA 63618 (root); NACA 63615 (tip)
- Empty weight: 345 kg (761 lb)
- Gross weight: 570 kg (1,257 lb)

Performance

- Maximum speed: 225 km/h (140 mph, 120 kn)
- Maximum glide ratio: 32
- Rate of sink: 0.70 m/s (138 ft/min)

== See also ==
Related development

- CVT M-100 single-seat glider
- CVT M-300 single-seat glider

Aircraft of comparable role, configuration, and era

- LET L-13 Blanik
- Schleicher ASK 13

Related lists

- List of aircraft
- List of gliders
