= Civil Aviation Department Mrigasheer =

Mrigasheer

General information
- Type: Standard-class sailplane
- Manufacturer: Civil Aviation Department of India

History
- First flight: November 1970

The Civil Aviation Department Mrigasheer (मृगशिरा - "Orion") was a standard-class sailplane developed in India in the 1970s. It was an orthodox design with a high wing, slender, tapering fuselage, and conventional empennage. Construction was wooden throughout. The original HS-1 flew in 1970 and was followed in 1973 by the refined HS-2 design. This differed from its predecessor in having slotted flaps instead of airbrakes, and a completely redesigned tail. The HS-2 prototype placed second in the national gliding championships only a month after its first flight.

== Specifications (HS-2) ==
General characteristics

- Crew: One pilot
- Length: 7.59 m (24 ft 11 in)
- Wingspan: 15.00 m (49 ft 3 in)
- Height: 2.50 m (8 ft 3 in)
- Wing area: 11.2 m^{2} (121 sq ft)
- Aspect ratio: 19.9
- Empty weight: 237 kg (522 lb)
- Gross weight: 335 kg (739 lb)

Performance

- Maximum speed: 213 km/h (133 mph, 116 kn)
- Maximum glide ratio: 32
- Rate of sink: 0.60 m/s (120 ft/min)
