= Caproni Vizzola Calif =

Family of Italian sailplanes

Calif
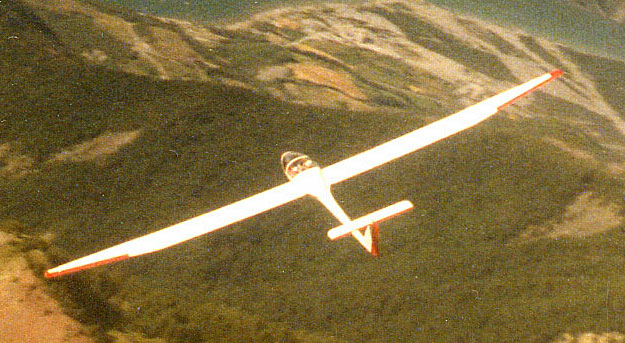

General information
- Type: 2-seat Sailplane
- Manufacturer: Caproni Vizzola
- Designer: Carlo Ferrarin and Livio Sonzio

History
- First flight: 1969

The Caproni Vizzola Calif was a family of Italian sailplanes, the first example flew in 1969, with production continuing into the 1970s and 1980s. Of typical sailplane configuration with T-tails, they featured distinctive wings with centre sections of constant chord and trapezoidal outer panels. The forward fuselage was constructed of fibreglass over an alloy frame, while the rear fuselage, wings, and empennage were metal-covered.

The most significant member of the family, and the only one produced in quantity (around 150 by the early 1980s) was the A-21S, a two-seat version that accommodated the pilot and passenger side by side. At one time this aircraft concurrently held four world records for two-seat sailplanes, including:

- the women's closed-circuit speed record set by Adele Orsi and Franca Bellengeri in August 1974
- straight distance of 970.4 km by Ingo Renner and Hilmer Geissler in Australia in 1975

== Variants ==
- A-10 (one built)
- A-12 (two built)
- A-14 (one built)
- A-15 (one built)
- A-20
  - A-20S - two-seat version of A-20
- A-21 - two-seat development of A-14
  - A-21S - refined production version of A-21
  - A-21SJ - jet-powered version of A-21 using either a 0.16 or 0.20 kN (36 or 45 lbf) thrust engine, having a 10,000 m (33,000 ft) ceiling. A trailing edge flap-airbrake is unique to this model. Marketed in America by AVIA America Corporation.

== Specifications (A-21S) ==
Data from

General characteristics

- Crew: one, pilot
- Capacity: one passenger
- Length: 7.84 m (21 ft 9 in)
- Wingspan: 20.38 m (66 ft 10 in)
- Height: 1.61 m (5 ft 3 in)
- Wing area: 16.2 m^{2} (174 sq ft)
- Aspect ratio: 25.6
- Empty weight: 436 kg (961 lb)
- Gross weight: 644 kg (1,420 lb)

Performance

- Maximum speed: 255 km/h (158 mph, 137 kn)
- Maximum glide ratio: 43:1
- Rate of sink: 0.60 m/s (118 ft/min)
