= CAT 15 =

Vittoria

General information
- Type: Primary glider
- National origin: Italy
- Manufacturer: Construzioni Aeronautiche Taliedo (CAT)
- Number built: 1

History
- First flight: 1938

The CAT 15 was a single-seat primary glider built in Italy just before the Second World War. Only one was constructed.

== Development ==
Like many primary gliders of the 1930s, the CAT 15 was an attempt to develop Alexander Lippisch's Zögling. One improvement was the pilot's environment, now seated in an open cockpit within a short fuselage nacelle rather than entirely exposed on a fuselage beam. Earlier Zögling variants like the SG-38 had also included a nacelle but not the CAT 15's cleaner strut braced wing which dispensed with many flying wires. The glider was designed and built at the Construzioni Aeronautiche Taliedo (CAT) under the supervision of Ettore Cattaneo. It was intended to take novice pilots through to their B certificate.

The CAT 15 was a high-wing monoplane, with its two spar wing supported centrally on the fuselage girder and braced on each side from the spars at about mid span to the lower fuselage with a V-form steel faired strut. The wing, mounted with slight dihedral, had constant chord and blunt tips. It had an aspect ratio of 7.8, noticeably higher than the Zögling's 6.7.

Its flat, wooden girder fuselage was very similar to that of the Zögling, with an upper and lower horizontal pair of beams and six diagonal and vertical cross braces. Since the CAT 15's wing was rigidly braced it did not need the above wing pylon which anchored the flying wires of the Zögling. The nacelle was a wooden structure with ovoid cross-section and fabric covering which extended aft just beyond the wing trailing edge. The rear of the girder was braced laterally with a pair of steel wires to the wings. The empennage of the CAT 15 was very similar to that of the Zögling, with a triangular tailplane mounted on the upper beam of the girder carrying rectangular elevators with a large cut-out to allow movement of the near-rectangular, deep, balanced rudder. The glider landed on a sprung skid reaching from the nose to the trailing edge.

== Specifications ==
Data from Pedrielli (2011) p.213

General characteristics

- Capacity: One
- Length: 5.60 m (18 ft 4 in)
- Wingspan: 10.70 m (35 ft 1 in)
- Wing area: 14.70 m^{2} (158.2 sq ft)
- Aspect ratio: 7.80
- Airfoil: NACA 4515
- Empty weight: 95 kg (209 lb)
- Gross weight: 165 kg (364 lb)

Performance

- Maximum glide ratio: estimated 15:1
- Rate of sink: 1.0 m/s (200 ft/min) minimum
- Wing loading: 11.2 kg/m^{2} (2.3 lb/sq ft)
