= CARMAM =

French sailplane manufacturer

Société CARMAM (Coopérative d'Approvisionnement et de Réparation de Matériel Aéronautique de Moulins) was a French sailplane manufacturer established at Moulins in the early 1970s. The firm originally manufactured the Aeromere M-100S and M-200 Foehn under licence, but eventually produced its own designs, the Aiglon and 15-38, as well as producing components for German manufacturer Glasflügel.
