= Castel C.25S =

Two-seat French glider, 1942

C.25S
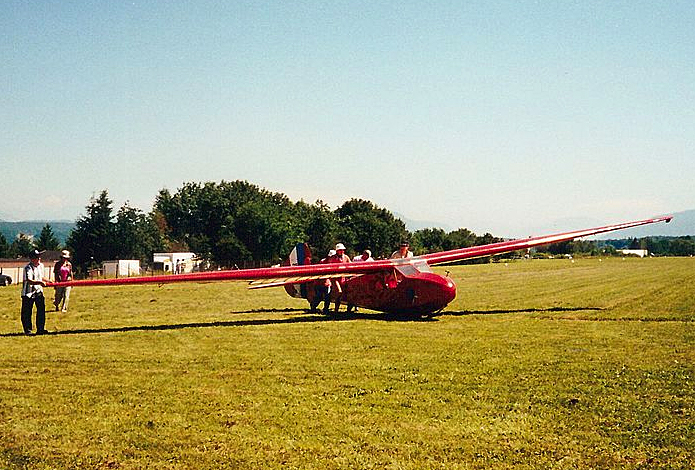

General information
- Type: Two seat glider trainer
- National origin: France
- Manufacturer: Estalissements Fouga et Cie
- Designer: Robert Castello
- Number built: 170

History
- Manufactured: 1945-48
- First flight: 1942

The Castel C.25S, sometimes known as the Aire, is a French training glider with side by side seating first flown during World War II. Post war, more than 100 were built for clubs, establishing national records. Several remained registered in 2010.

== Design and development ==
Robert Castello began the design of the C.25S soon after the Franco-German Armistice of June 1940, at about the same time as the start of the Caudron C.800 design. Both aircraft were intended to increase the number of machines available for recreational gliding in the southern, unoccupied region of France. The first two prototypes of the C.25S both flew in 1942.

The C.25S is an all wood aircraft with a monocoque fuselage skinned with plywood and fabric covered, wooden framed wings. The cantilever, high mounted, constant dihedral wings have a constant chord inner section, occupying about 40% of the span, and outer, straight tapered panels with rounded wing tips and ailerons filling their trailing edges. Airbrakes are mounted at mid-chord on the inner-outer panel junction, opening above the wings.

The fuselage has parallel, flat sides and is polygonal in cross-section, tapering to the tail. The crew are seated beneath the leading edge of the wing in side-by-side seating equipped with dual control, enclosed by a canopy which is hinged at the leading edge of the wing. The C.23S has a narrow fin with a shallow forward extension that mounts the tapered tailplane clear of the fuselage. Its rudder is horn balanced, has a curved trailing edge and extends down to the keel, requiring a cut-out between the separate elevators for its movement. The C.25S has a fixed monowheel undercarriage, assisted by a forward mounted main skid and small tailskid.

== Operational history ==
100 C.25S were ordered by the French Air Ministry to assist the post-war revival of aviation in France. These were built in Fouga's factory at Aire-sur-Adour between 1945 and 1948 and delivered to French gliding clubs. Significantly more may have been built; some sources say that another 30 were built during the war but Bonneau states that only the two prototypes were then constructed. Hardy asserts a total of 200. Despite the uncertainty, it seems there were fewer C.25Ss with French clubs than Caudron C.800s but that the two types together provided the backbone of the French glider basic training fleet until the arrival of the Wassmer WA 30 Bijave in the early 1960s, a period of fifteen years or more.

The C.25S proved to be a successful long distance flyer, setting several records in the early 1950s.

A pair of C.25S had a role in one of the most commercially successful French films, the 1966 comedy La Grande Vadrouille.

Five remained on the French civil aircraft register in 2010.

== Specifications ==
Data from The World's Sailplanes

General characteristics

- Crew: Two
- Length: 7.23 m (23 ft 9 in)
- Wingspan: 16.0 m (52 ft 6 in)
- Height: 2.22 m (7 ft 3 in)
- Wing area: 20.0 m^{2} (215 sq ft)
- Aspect ratio: 12.8
- Empty weight: 261 kg (575 lb)
- Gross weight: 441 kg (972 lb)

Performance

- Never exceed speed: 140 km/h (87 mph, 76 kn)
- Rough air speed max: 90 km/h (55.9 mph; 48.6 kn)
- Aerotow speed: 100 km/h (62.1 mph; 54.0 kn)
- Maximum glide ratio: about 25 at 67–69 km/h (41.6–42.9 mph; 36.2–37.3 kn)
- Rate of sink: 0.73 m/s (144 ft/min) minimum, at 62 km/h (38.5 mph; 33.5 kn)
- Wing loading: 22.0 kg/m^{2} (4.5 lb/sq ft)
