= CAT 28BP =

General information
- Type: Two seat high performance and training glider
- National origin: Italy
- Manufacturer: Construzioni Aeronautiche Taliedo (CAT)
- Designer: Ettore Cattaneo
- Number built: 1

History
- First flight: 1938

The CAT 28BP (biposto, English: two seat) was an Italian development of the licence built Dittmar Condor II into a high performance tandem two seat glider. Built in 1938, it anticipated the post-war, two seat Dittmar Condor IV and held the Italian national distance record for many years.

== Design and development ==
Construzioni Aeronautiche Taliedo (CAT) built two German glider designs under licence, the second of them the single seat Dittmar Condor II. This was designated CAT 28 and flew in 1936. At Adriano Mantelli's suggestion, Etteore Cattaneo designed a two-seat version, the CAT 28BP, with a second seat in tandem under the wing and an increase in span and wing area to cope with the greater weight. It was intended for record breaking, aerobatics and as a training aircraft. At the time there was no German two seat Condor, though the Condor IV was produced post-war.

Though 500 mm (20 in) greater in span, the two seater's wing was very similar to that of the CAT 28. It was built around a single spar; plywood covering ahead of the spar around the leading edge formed a torsion resisting D-box, with fabric covering behind the spar. It had a rectangular plan inner section with dihedral and tapered outer panels without dihedral, producing a gull wing ending in elliptical tips. The taper on the trailing edge began at greater span than the change of dihedral but the ailerons filling it were hinged parallel to the tapered region. Spoilers just aft of the spar and beyond the inner section of the wing extended above and below it.

The fuselage was also a ply skinned, wooden structure which supported the wing centrally on what was, on the CAT 28, a pedestal, developed into a second, rear cockpit with side windows and accessed from above via a forward hinged trap door in the wing. Single faired lift struts on each side from the lower fuselage braced the wing at the edge of the inner gull section. The insertion of the second seat left the overall length and the fuselage otherwise unchanged; the front cockpit was ahead of the wing leading edge with a rear hinged canopy that could be opened in flight for pilots who preferred open cockpits. Dual control was fitted. Aft of the trailing edge the fuselage became slender. The CAT 28BP had a high aspect ratio, strongly tapered all moving tailplane with a small cut-out for rudder movement. Its fin was short and small but mounted a large, curved and rounded balanced rudder which extended down to the keel, protected by a small tail bumper. The main undercarriage was a skid running aft from the nose to behind the rear cockpit.

The CAT 28BP first flew in 1938, piloted by Mantelli, and performed well in testing. For many years it held the Italian national distance record. It also competed with success in national competitions.

== Specifications ==
Data from Pedrielli (2011)

General characteristics

- Capacity: Two
- Length: 7.70 m (25 ft 3 in)
- Wingspan: 18.20 m (59 ft 9 in)
- Wing area: 21 m^{2} (230 sq ft)
- Aspect ratio: 15.8
- Empty weight: 250 kg (551 lb)
- Gross weight: 410 kg (904 lb)

Performance

- Maximum glide ratio: estimated 26:1
- Rate of sink: 0.5 m/s (98 ft/min)
- Wing loading: 19.5 kg/m^{2} (4.0 lb/sq ft)
