= Issoire Silène =

Two-seat glider, France 1974

CE 75, E 78, and I 79 Silène

General information
- Type: Sailplane
- National origin: France
- Manufacturer: Siren, CERVA, Issoire
- Number built: 6 by 1978

History
- First flight: 2 July 1974

The Issoire Silène was a sailplane produced in France in the 1970s and early 1980s, intended primarily as a trainer. It was a conventional design of fibreglass construction in versions with fixed or retractable monowheel undercarriage. The aircraft featured side-by-side seating for two, with the seats slightly staggered in order to minimise fuselage width. French certification was obtained on 3 February 1978, and production began shortly thereafter at the rate of two aircraft per month.

The original CE 75 design was refined as the E 78, which featured a redesigned and roomier cockpit, and was again available in fixed and retractable undercarriage versions. A further development, the I 79, was in development in 1979, and featured tanks for water ballast as well as hydraulically operated flaps, undercarriage, and airbrakes.

== Specifications (CE 75 Silène) ==
Data from Jane's all the World's Aircraft 1976–77

General characteristics

- Crew: 2
- Length: 7.95 m (26 ft 1 in)
- Wingspan: 18 m (59 ft 1 in)
- Height: 1.5 m (4 ft 11 in)
- Wing area: 18 m^{2} (190 sq ft)
- Airfoil: Bertin E55-166 (16.6%)
- Empty weight: 320 kg (705 lb)
- Max takeoff weight: 540 kg (1,190 lb)

Performance

- Stall speed: 63 km/h (39 mph, 34 kn) (single seat)

68 km/h (42 mph; 37 kn) (two seat with radio)
70.5 km/h (43.8 mph; 38.1 kn) (two seat with radio and oxygen equipment)

- Never exceed speed: 245 km/h (152 mph, 132 kn)
- Max aerotow speed: 164 km/h (102 mph; 89 kn)
- g limits: +5.3 (normal); +8 (ultimate)
- Maximum glide ratio: 36:1 at 84 km/h (52 mph; 45 kn) (single seat fixed mainwheel)

36 at 91.5 km/h (56.9 mph; 49.4 kn) (two seat with radio fixed mainwheel)
38 at 91.5 km/h (56.9 mph; 49.4 kn) (retractable mainwheel)

- Rate of sink: 0.59 m/s (116 ft/min) at 84 km/h (52 mph; 45 kn) (single seat)

0.64 m/s (2.1 ft/s) at 91.5 km/h (56.9 mph; 49.4 kn) (two seat with radio)
0.67 m/s (2.2 ft/s) at 91.5 km/h (56.9 mph; 49.4 kn) (two seat with radio and oxygen equipment)

- Wing loading: 31 kg/m^{2} (6.3 lb/sq ft) (max with oxygen equipment)

29 kg/m^{2} (5.9 lb/sq ft) (two seat with radio)
25 kg/m^{2} (5.1 lb/sq ft) (single seat)
