= Caproni Vizzola 2 =

General information
- Type: Single-seat training and aerobatic glider
- National origin: Italy
- Manufacturer: Caproni Vizzola with the Gliding Group Tommaso del Molin of Varese
- Number built: 2

History
- First flight: 1938
- Developed from: Caproni Vizzola MF

The Caproni Vizzola MF and 2 were single-seat gliders built in Italy just before World War II. Intended as training aircraft capable of aerobatics, the two variants differed only in their fuselages. Only one of each was built, but they were both successful in Italian competitions.

== Development ==
The Caproni Vizzola 2 was a medium performance glider, intended primarily as a training aircraft but also to be capable of aerobatics. It was designed and built by a collaboration of staff from the Caproni Vizzola works at Vizzola Ticino and the Gliding Group of Varese.

It was a high-wing monoplane, with its wing supported centrally on a fuselage pedestal and braced on each side with a faired wooden strut from the main spar at about quarter span to the lower fuselage. The wing had a rectangular plan central section which occupied about half the span and straight-tapered, round-tipped outer panels which carried the broad chord ailerons. Only the outer panels had dihedral. The inner section had airbrakes just behind the spar. The empennage of the glider was conventional, with its tapered and round-tipped tailplane and elevator ahead of the rudder The latter was broad, balanced and rounded, mounted on a small fin.

Apart from having different cross-sections, the fuselages of the two models built differed only in cockpit and undercarriage details. The first seems to have been referred to as the Caproni Vizzola MF; the second was certainly the Caproni Vizzola 2. In both, the rear of the cockpit was under the wing leading edge with the pilot's head against the pedestal. On the MF the cockpit was open with just a small windscreen but the Caproni Vizzola 2 had a deeper and longer cockpit enclosed by a framed canopy and with three small transparencies in the nose. Behind the wing the pedestal fell away gently as the fuselage tapered to the tail. The first model had an hexagonal cross section fuselage but that of the Caparoni Vizzola 2 was smother externally and had a teardrop section. Both were plywood skinned. They shared the usual sprung skid undercarriage and tail bumper, though the skid on the later model was extended a little rearwards; both had a fixed monowheel below the wing.

Both aircraft were successfully flown in a large number of Italian national competitions. After World War II the Vizzola 2 was flown by the SIAI Marchetta Gliding Club at Vergiate.

== Variants ==
Caproni Vizzola MF
Original fuselage with hexagonal cross-section.
Caproni Vizzola 2
Refined fuselage with teardrop cross-section.

== Specifications ==
Data from Pedrielli (2011) p.211

General characteristics

- Capacity: One
- Length: 6.55 m (21 ft 6 in)
- Wingspan: 14.0 m (45 ft 11 in)
- Wing area: 13 m^{2} (140 sq ft)
- Aspect ratio: 15
- Empty weight: 158 kg (348 lb)
- Gross weight: 248 kg (547 lb)

Performance

- Maximum glide ratio: estimated 21:1
- Rate of sink: 0.73 m/s (144 ft/min) minimum
- Wing loading: 19 kg/m^{2} (3.9 lb/sq ft)
