= Civil Aviation Department Ashvini =

Ashvini

General information
- Type: Two seat trainer glider
- National origin: India
- Manufacturer: Civil Aviation Department
- Designer: S.Ramamritham
- Number built: 15

History
- First flight: 3 September 1958

The Civil Aviation Department Ashvini was the first two-seat glider designed and built in India. It was produced in small numbers in the early 1960s.

== Design and development ==
Ashvini is the first nakshatra, a lunar based division of the ecliptic in Hindu astrology. The glider named after it was the first Indian two seater, developed for the Indian Civil Aviation Gliding Centres and the National Cadet Corps. The first prototype, the TS-2 Ashvini, was first flown on 3 September 1958 by F.H. Irani and later in its development by the very experienced glider pilot Hanna Reitsch. It was displayed to Prime Minister Nehru at Delhi Airport in February 1959. The reports of both pilots led to improvements incorporated in the next three pre-production prototypes, termed TS-3 Ashvini, along with some alterations made to ease later production. The first TS-3 flew in July 1959. The series production aircraft, first flown in prototype form in December 1960, was named the TS-4 Ashvini II. Alterations included revised forward fuselage contours and changes to control runs in the cockpit which allowed seats and sills to be lowered, easing access. The lift to drag ratio was increased by lowering the wing relative to the fuselage, improving the aerodynamics of the junction. Eleven production TS-4s were built.

The Asvini had an all-wood structure, covered with a mixture of plywood and fabric, using Indian grown spruce and cedar. Its three part wing had two spars and 4° of forward sweep at the quarter chord line. The centre section had a span of 6.10 m (20 ft 0 in) and the outer panels were detachable. In plan the wing was straight tapered (taper ratio 0.41), with forward sweep on both leading and trailing edges. It was ply covered forward of the rear spar around the leading edge, forming a torsion box, and fabric covered over the remaining 30% of chord. Its high cantilever wing was mounted with 1° dihedral on top of the spar. It had plain fabric covered ailerons and short DFS-type air-brake pairs placed behind the forward spar at about one quarter span. There were no flaps.

The Ashvini's fuselage was a ply covered wooden-semi-monocoque including an integral, ply covered fin with a straight, swept leading edge. Its balanced rudder, full and rounded, extended down to the keel. The horizontal tail was straight edged and double tapered, with square tips. It was mostly fabric covered apart from the leading edge and root and was placed on top of the fuselage, far enough forward that the inner edges of the separate elevators were in line with the rudder hinge. The rear control surfaces were fabric covered.

Pupil and instructor, provided with dual controls, sat in tandem ahead of the wing leading edge, the latter at the rear over the centre of gravity. They had separate perspex canopies; the forward canopy was side hinged and the instructor's opened rearwards. The main landing gear was a single, non-retractable wheel without brakes. Ahead of the wheel and under the cockpits was a rubber sprung, steel shod skid and at the rear there was a short, tennis ball sprung tail skid.

== Variants ==
Data from Jane's All the World's Aircraft 1964/5

TS-2 Ashvini
First prototype, first flown September 1958.
TS-3 Ashvini
Pre-production prototypes with modifications to ease production and as a result of prototype flight testing. First flown July 1959; three built.
TS-4 Ashvini II
Production version with further improvements: forward fuselage and cockpit revised for easier access and wings lowered to improve wing-fuselage junction aerodynamics. First prototype flew December 1960 followed by eleven production models built by Aeronautical Services Ltd; production ended 1963.

== Specifications (Ashvini II) ==
Data from Jane's All the World's Aircraft 1964/5

General characteristics

- Length: 8.66 m (28 ft 5 in)
- Wingspan: 17.68 m (58 ft 0 in)
- Height: 2.36 m (7 ft 9 in)
- Wing area: 19.51 m^{2} (210.0 sq ft)
- Aspect ratio: 16
- Airfoil: NACA 4418 at root, NACA 4412 at tip
- Empty weight: 318 kg (701 lb) equipped
- Max takeoff weight: 500 kg (1,102 lb)
- Wing loading: 25.6 kg/m^{2} (5.24 lb/sqft)

Performance

- Maximum speed: 216 km/h (134 mph, 117 kn) placard, smooth air; rough air 75 mph; 65 kn (120 km/h)
- Stall speed: 48 km/h (30 mph, 26 kn)
- Never exceed speed: 222 km/h (138 mph, 120 kn) in dive
- Maximum glide ratio: best, 23 at 48 mph; 42 kn (77 km/h)
- Rate of sink: 0.82 m/s (161 ft/min) minimum, at 36 mph; 31 kn (58 km/h)
