= Czerwiński and Jaworski CWJ =

1931 training glider

CWJ
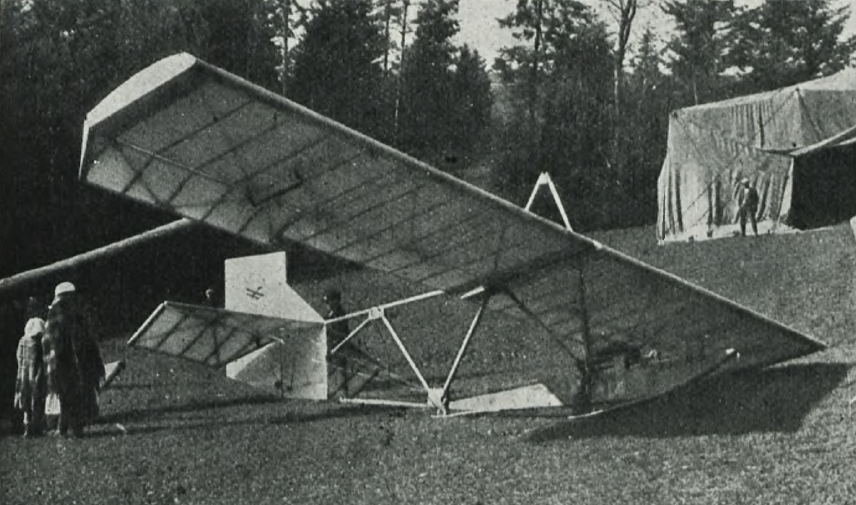

General information
- Type: Basic training glider
- National origin: Poland
- Manufacturer: ZASPL
- Designer: Wacław Czerwiński and Władysław Jaworski
- Number built: 80-100

History
- First flight: 1931

The Czerwiński and Jaworski CWJ was a basic training glider designed and flown in Poland in 1931. Between eighty and one hundred examples of it and an improved variant, the CWJ-bis Skaut, were built.

== Design and development ==
ZASPL, the Aviation Association of students of the Lwów Technical University, was the oldest aviation organization in Poland. Revived after World War I, by 1926 it had workshops in Lwów which began building the glider designs of ZASPL member Wacław Czerwiński. The successful Czerwiński CW III, a 1929 open frame introductory glider, had shown the utility of the type for basic training but it was expensive and ready for development. In response, Czerwiński and Władysław Jarworski designed the CWJ (a fusion of their initials) to fill the national gliding clubs' needs.

The fuselage of the CWJ was essentially an uncovered pine Warren girder, though the rear part of the lower longeron or chord was upward-curved. The unprotected pilot's seat was forward of the wing on a pine fuselage box which reached back to about mid fuselage. The box also carried twin sprung landing skids. The CWJ's two part, twin spar wing was rectangular in plan. Mounted on the upper fuselage longeron, it was wire braced from above via an inverted-V cabane and from below to the lower longeron. Short ailerons reached the tips.

At the rear a broad fin occupied the gap between the upper and lower longerons and had a short, triangular extension above. An almost rectangular rudder ran upwards from the bottom of the fin, extending well above it. The tailplane, mounted on the upper longeron, was triangular in plan. It carried elevators which were rectangular apart from cut-outs for rudder movement.

The CWJ first flew in October 1931, tow-launched by a car. An improved version, the CWJ-bis Skaut (Scout) made its first flight on 3 August 1933 at Czerwony Kamień, the base of the Lwów Aeroclub Gliding School. It had a wing increased in span by 900 mm (35 in), a corresponding 11% increase in wing area and had washout at the wingtips which improved aileron response. The wire wing bracing of the CWJ was replaced by pairs of parallel struts and the fuselage box was strengthened. The empennage was also modified; the fin now had a triangular, rather than straight, leading edge and at some later time the top of the rudder was made almost semi-circular. Early tests showed the sought-after improvement in handling.

== Operational history ==
Shortly after its successful early tests, early orders from both the government and LOPP took the CWJ into production. Design drawings were also produced for amateur builders and some parts and materials were made available from ZAPL. According to Cynk about eighty examples of the CWJ and CWJ-bis were built in all, including about twenty of the latter, though samalotypolskie.pl says that there were one hundred altogether, eighty of them CWJs. They were used by clubs across Poland and were easy to transport, tough, could be car-launched and were stable in flight though with limited performance. By about 1938 both variants had been retired, displaced by the newer, better performing Kocjan Czajka and Kocjan Wrona.

== Variants ==
CWJ
1931 aircraft. Production estimates are about sixty or eighty.

CWJ-bis Skaut
1933 improved model with washout for better aileron control. The fuselage box was strengthened and the vertical tail modified. A few had ply-covered cockpits. Production estimates are about twenty.

== Specifications (CWJ) ==
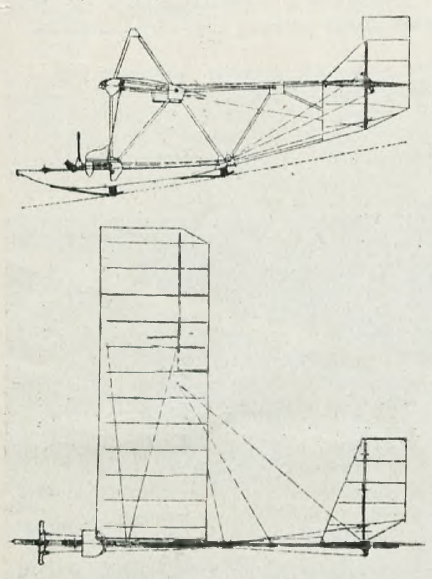
CWJ

Data from General J. Cynk, 1971, Performance samolotypolskie.pl.

General characteristics

- Crew: One
- Length: 5.59 m (18 ft 4 in)
- Wingspan: 8.75 m (28 ft 8 in)
- Height: 2.21 m (7 ft 3 in)
- Wing area: 13 m^{2} (140 sq ft)
- Empty weight: 80 kg (176 lb)
- Gross weight: 150 kg (331 lb)

Performance

- Stall speed: 42 km/h (26 mph, 23 kn) minimum speed
- Maximum glide ratio: 12 maximum at 50 km/h (31 mph; 27 kn)
- Rate of sink: 1.3 m/s (260 ft/min) minimum
