= Caudron C.800 =

Two-seat French glider, 1942

C.800
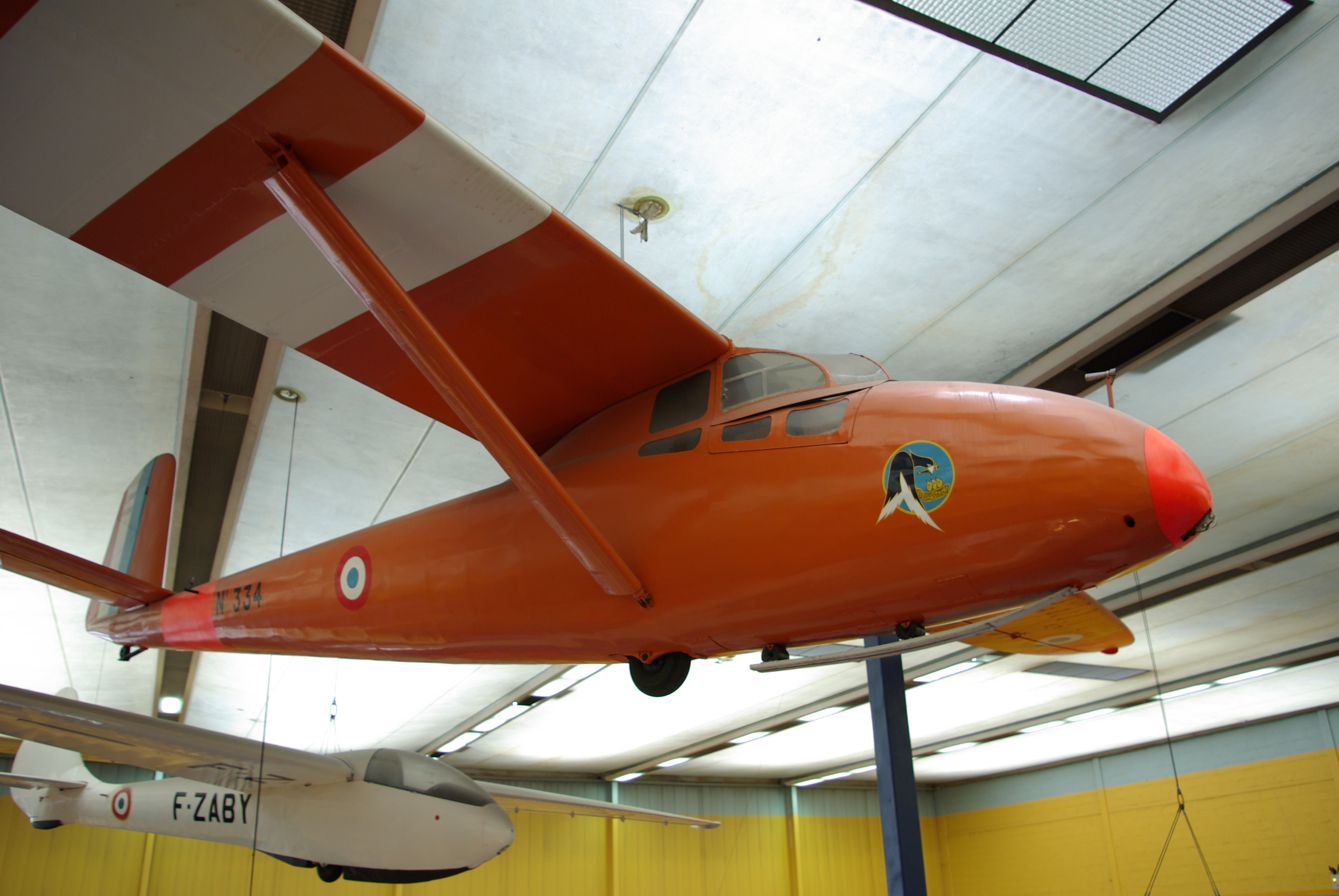

General information
- Type: Two-seat basic training glider
- National origin: France
- Manufacturer: SNCAN
- Designer: Raymond Jarlaud
- Number built: 315

History
- First flight: April 1942

The Caudron C.800, at first also known as the Epervier (English: Sparrowhawk) is a French two seat training glider, designed and first flown during World War II and put into large scale post-war production. It was the dominant basic training glider with French clubs until the 1960s and several still fly.

== Design and development ==
Design of the Caudron C.800 began soon after the Franco-German Armistice of June 1940, proceeding in parallel with that of the Castel C.25S. Both aircraft were intended to increase the number of machines available for recreational gliding in the southern, unoccupied region of France. Its wood framed, fabric covered high wings are braced from below with short and quite broad chord faired struts, one on each side, from the lower fuselage to the constant chord wing centre section. Outboard the wing panels taper roughly elliptically, with obliquely hinged ailerons filling their whole trailing edges.

The fuselage is a plywood covered wooden monocoque with an oval cross section; the wing is mounted at the highest point immediately behind the cockpit, which places instructor and pupil in side-by-side seats ahead of the leading edge, equipped with dual control and covered by a short, upward opening, rear hinged, multi-piece canopy. There is another pair of opening fuselage transparencies immediately below the canopy. Behind the wing the fuselage tapers, initially quickly, to the tail where the narrow chord, round tipped tailplane is mounted, with some dihedral, on top of it. The broader, split elevators are ahead of a straight edged, blunt tipped narrow fin and wide rudder. Like the wings, the empennage is wood framed and fabric covered. The monowheel undercarriage is assisted by a sprung, wooden skid reaching forwards from the wheel to the nose, and by a tail skid.

Two prototype C.800s were flown during World War II, the first in April 1942. A single-seat version, the C.810 was also flown in 1942 but these two prototypes were destroyed by bombing. An improved single-seat variant, the C.811 was flown after 1945 but not developed; it was seen by the French Air Ministry as too similar to existing types such as the Grunau.

In 1951 an improved version of the C.800 named C.801 was designed by Raymond Jarlaud. This had a reinforced structure, an enlarged rudder and balanced ailerons. Cockpit visibility was improved by simplifying the frames with more curved glazing and ground handling was made easier by moving the monowheel forward.

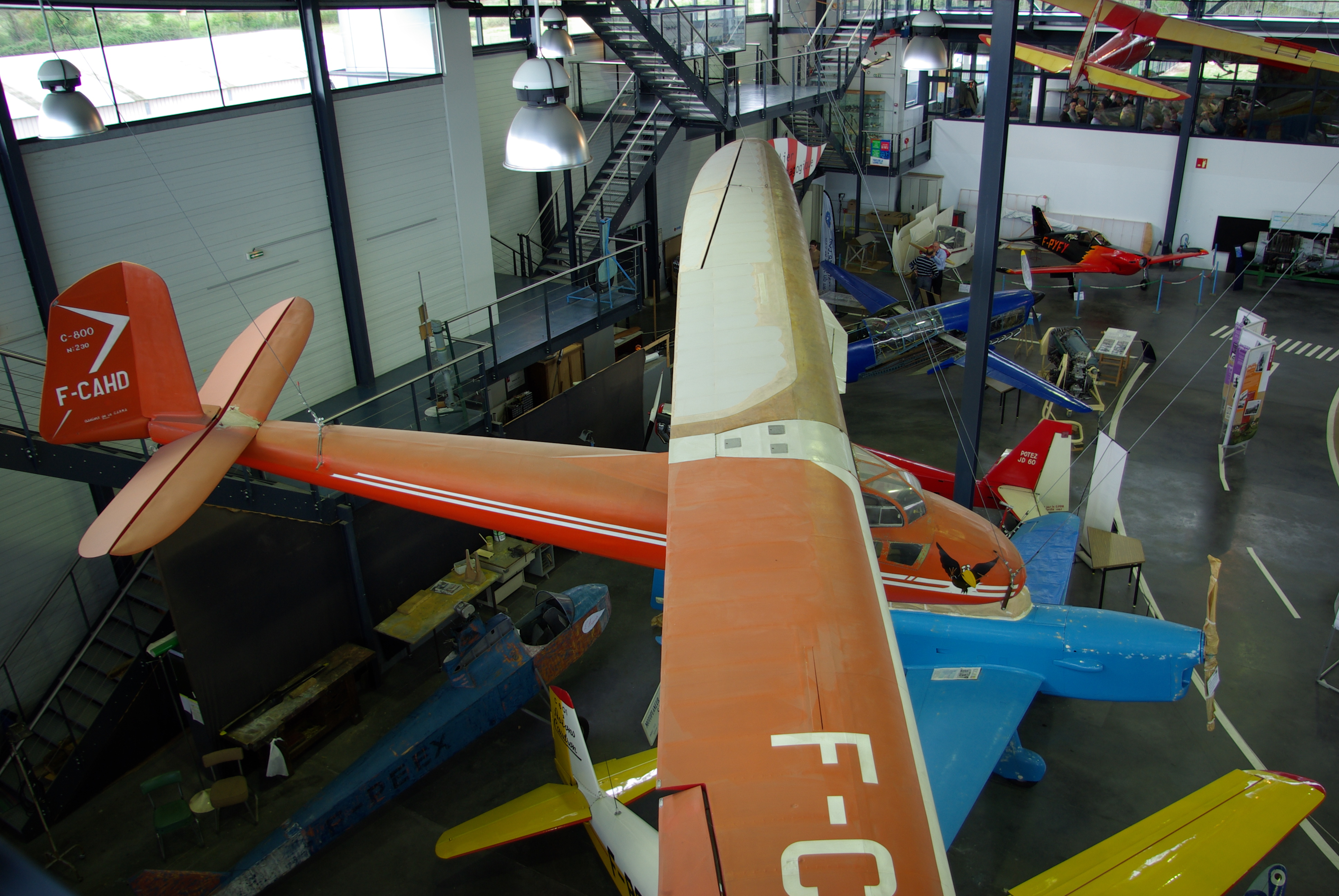

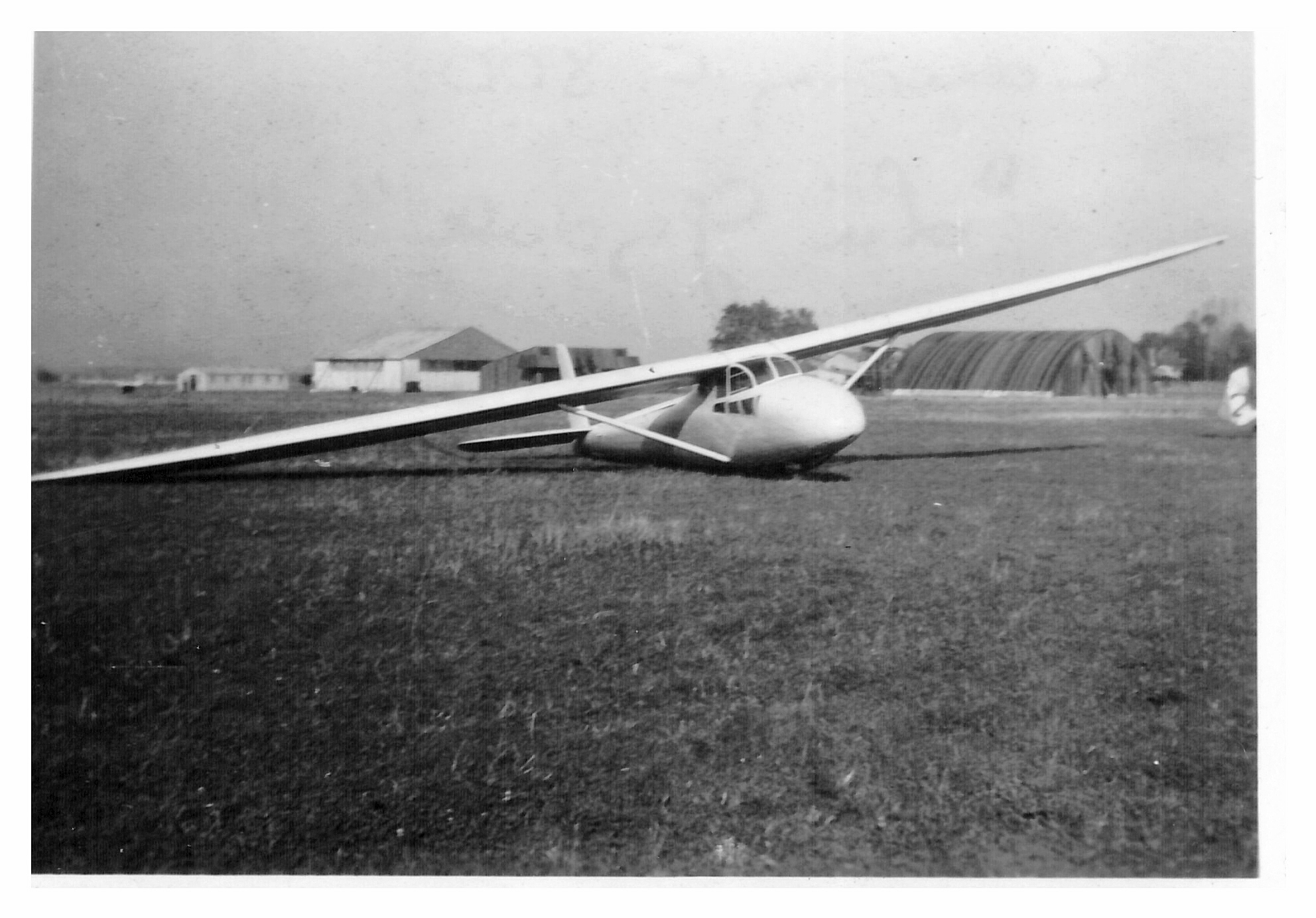
C800 on Lyon-Corbas (France) field circa 1950

== Operational history ==
After the liberation of France in 1944, the French government ordered 450 as part of an effort to revive French aviation, though this was later reduced to 248. Production of 300 began in 1945 at the Aire-sur-Adour factory of the Fouga company, by then part of SCAN. Most went to civil gliding clubs becoming, along with the Castel C.25S, the national standard two-seat trainer type until their replacement by the Wassmer WA 30 Bijave in the early 1960s. It remained an important club stalwart for twenty years after its introduction. Some were operated by the French Air Force and Aéronavale.

Ten C.801s were built at Aire-sur-Adour but were withdrawn from use in 1957 on safety grounds.

In 2010 six C.800s remained on the French civil aircraft register and one on the Dutch.

== Variants ==
C.800
Original 1940s production; 302 built.
C.800 Motorized version
Little is known of this one-off modification.
C.801
Improved 1950s version; 10 built.
C.810
Single-seat variant, flown 1942. The two prototypes were destroyed by bombing.
C.811
Improved C.310 flown post-war but not developed.

== Aircraft on display ==
Data from Aviation Museums and Collections of Mainland Europe. C.800s are on public display at

- The Army Museum, Brussels
- Musée de l'Agriculture et de la Locomotion, Uzès
- Musée Maurice Dufresnes, Azay-le-Rideau
- Musée Régional de l'Air, Angers
- Musée de l'Aviation de Mas Palegry, Perpignan
- Musée de l'Air et de l'Espace, le Bourget
- Ailes Anciennes Toulouse, Blagnac

== Specifications (C.800) ==
Data from The World's Sailplanes:Die Segelflugzeuge der Welt:Les Planeurs du Monde

General characteristics

- Crew: Two
- Length: 8.35 m (27 ft 5 in)
- Wingspan: 16.0 m (52 ft 6 in)
- Height: 2.36 m (7 ft 9 in)
- Wing area: 22.0 m^{2} (237 sq ft)
- Aspect ratio: 11.6
- Airfoil: root Göttingen 654, tip Göttingen 676
- Empty weight: 240 kg (529 lb)
- Gross weight: 420 kg (926 lb)

Performance

- Never exceed speed: 170 km/h (110 mph, 92 kn)
- Rough air speed max: 85 km/h (52.8 mph; 45.9 kn)
- Aerotow speed: 90 km/h (55.9 mph; 48.6 kn)
- Rate of sink: 0.93 m/s (183 ft/min) at 68 km/h (42.3 mph; 36.7 kn)
- Lift-to-drag: ~21 at 78 km/h (48.5 mph; 42.1 kn)
- Wing loading: 19.1 kg/m^{2} (3.9 lb/sq ft)

== Bibliography ==
- Cortet, Pierre (April 2000). "Rétros du Mois" [Retros of the Month]. Avions: Toute l'Aéronautique et son histoire (in French) (85): 5. ISSN 1243-8650.
- Hardy, Michael (1982). Gliders & Sailplanes of the World. London: Ian Allan Ltd. p. 25. ISBN 0 7110 1152 4.
- Ogden, Bob (2009). Aviation Museums and Collections of Mainland Europe. Air Britain (Historians) Ltd. ISBN 978 0 85130 418 2.
- OSTIV (1958). The World's Sailplanes. Vol. 1. OSTIV & Schweizer Aero-Revue. pp. 31, 34.
- Partington, Dave (2010). European registers handbook 2010. Air Britain (Historians) Ltd. ISBN 978-0-85130-425-0.
- "French glider production" (PDF). Vintage Glider Club News. 44: 11–22. Summer 1982. Archived from the original (PDF) on 2012-03-24. "production figures as stated in a special edition of AVIASPORT for French glider types, published by Pierre Bonneau in 1960"
- "Caudron C.800 - j2mcl Planeurs".
- "Caudron C.801 - j2mcl Planeurs".
