= Civil Aviation Department BS-1 Bharani =

BS-1 Bharani

General information
- Type: Two seat trainer glider
- National origin: India
- Manufacturer: Civil Aviation Department
- Designer: S. Ramamritham

History
- First flight: 6 April 1962

The Civil Aviation Department BS-1 Bharani was a tandem seat trainer glider designed and built in India in the early 1960s.

== Design and development ==
Several Civil Aviation Department aircraft were named after divisions (nakshatra) of the zodiac used in Hindu astrology; Bharani (भरणी) is one of these, literally meaning "the bearer". The glider named after it was a wood-framed aircraft, covered with fabric and plywood. It had a high cantilever wing with a single spar, ahead of which ply covering formed a torsion resisting box. Behind the spar it was fabric covered. The leading edge was straight and unswept but forward sweep on the trailing edge both tapered the wing in plan and resulted in a forward sweep of 1° at the spar. The wing had 1° of dihedral, wooden plain ailerons and wooden air brakes which opened above and below the wing.

The fuselage was a wood-framed, ply-covered semi-monocoque. The tandem cockpit was ahead of the wing under a two-piece canopy which merged into the upper wing, assisted by a small transparency in the leading edge to improve upward vision from the rear seat. The forward part hinged sideways and the aft part rearwards. It had dual controls and instrumentation; oxygen supplies could be fitted if necessary. The tail unit had a straight-edged, ply-covered fin with a full, rounded, fabric-covered rudder. Apart from some ply covering on the inner part of the tailplane the horizontal surfaces were also fabric-covered. The leading edge of the straight tapered tailplane was well ahead of that of the fin.

The undercarriage was a fixed single monowheel, without a brake but assisted by a rubber-sprung nose skid which had a steel underside that could be replaced if damaged. There was also a small tail skid which was sprung with tennis balls.

The first flight was on 6 April 1962. No Civil Aviation Technical School designs were produced by them, though some were produced by external companies provided with full plans by the school. No production of the Bharani had been reported by late 1963.

== Specifications ==
Data from Jane's All the World's Aircraft 1964/5

General characteristics

- Crew: Two
- Length: 8.33 m (27 ft 4 in)
- Wingspan: 19.00 m (62 ft 4 in)
- Height: 2.44 m (8 ft 0 in)
- Wing area: 20.97 m^{2} (225.7 sq ft)
- Aspect ratio: 17.21
- Airfoil: NACA 64_{3}618 at root, 64_{1}A612 at tip
- Empty weight: 350 kg (772 lb)
- Max takeoff weight: 550 kg (1,213 lb)
- Maximum wing loading: 26.2 kg/m^{2} (5.4 lb/sqft)

Performance

- Maximum speed: 185 km/h (115 mph, 100 kn) in smooth air, 80 mph; 69 kn (128 km/h) in rough air
- Stall speed: 56 km/h (35 mph, 30 kn)
- Never exceed speed: 227 km/h (141 mph, 123 kn) diving
- Maximum glide ratio: best, 31.5 at 51 mph; 44 kn (82 km/h)
- Rate of sink: 0.61 m/s (120 ft/min) minimum, at 42 mph; 36 kn (67 km/h)
