= W.W.S.2 Żaba =

WWS-2 Żaba
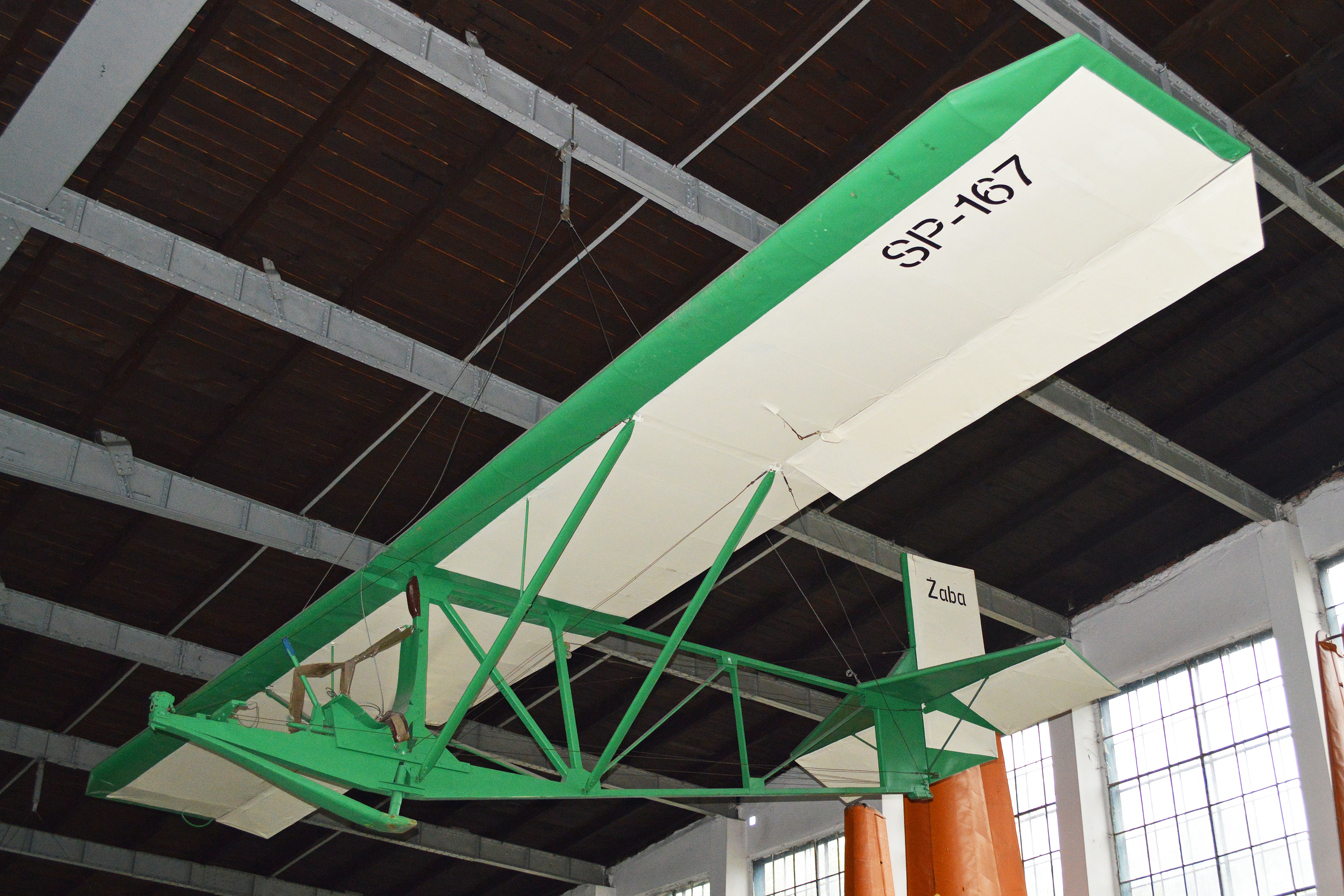
- WWS-2 Żaba at the Polish Aviation Museum

General information
- Type: Glider
- National origin: Poland
- Manufacturer: Wojskowych Warsztatów Szybowcowych
- Designer: Wacław Czerwiński
- Number built: 210+

History
- First flight: 1937
- Developed from: Wacław Czerwiński & Władysław Jaworski CWJ-bis Skaut

The WWS-2 Żaba (Frog) was a single-seat training glider designed and built in Poland from 1937.

== Development ==
Czerwiński improved the design of the CWJ-bis, with reduced structure weight and changes to the flying control surfaces, to improve performance and manoeuvrability. The W.W.S. 2 followed the primary trainer concept with a skeletal fuselage wire-braced to a simple fabric covered wing, supported by two struts each side, and tail unit. The completely open seating area followed the theory of the day, that called for the student pilot to feel the wind on his/her body to fully appreciate the movements of the aircraft in response to control movements and atmospheric changes, such as gusts, turbulence or thermals. One W.W.S. 2 survived the war, to fly again, and was retired to the Kraków Aviation Museum in 1950.

Production of the Żaba at the W.W.S. Commenced in 1937, with 60-70 built before the outbreak of World War II. The Żaba II (Żaba-bis) was produced at the Lwow aviation workshops (L.W.L.), with approx 150 built, 20 for export.

== Variants ==
- WWS-2 Żaba – production aircraft from W.W.S. From 1937.
- WWS-2-bis Żaba II – improved version with reduced weight and improved controls built by the Lwow Aviation Workshops (L.W.L.).
- CWA Wren – A WWS-2 Żaba built in Canada, after WWII, by Wacław Czerwiński.

== Specifications (WWS-2 Żaba) ==
Data from http://www.piotrp.de/SZYBOWCE/pwws2.htm

General characteristics

- Crew: 1
- Length: 5.45 m (17 ft 10 in)
- Wingspan: 9.33 m (30 ft 7.5 in)
- Height: 1.65 m (5 ft 5 in)
- Wing area: 13.8 m^{2} (148.5 sq ft)
- Aspect ratio: 6.3:1
- Airfoil: Göttingen-365
- Empty weight: 85 kg (187 lb)
- Gross weight: 164 kg (362 lb)

Performance

- Stall speed: 43 km/h (27 mph, 23 kn)
- g limits: +4.45 g
- Maximum glide ratio: 11:1 at 54 km/h (29 kts, 33 mph)
- Rate of sink: 1.2 m/s (240 ft/min) at 45 km/h (28 mph, 25 kn)

== See also ==
Aircraft of comparable role, configuration, and era

- Lippisch Zögling
- Slingsby T.3 Primary
