= CVV-4 Pellicano =

Italian competition glider

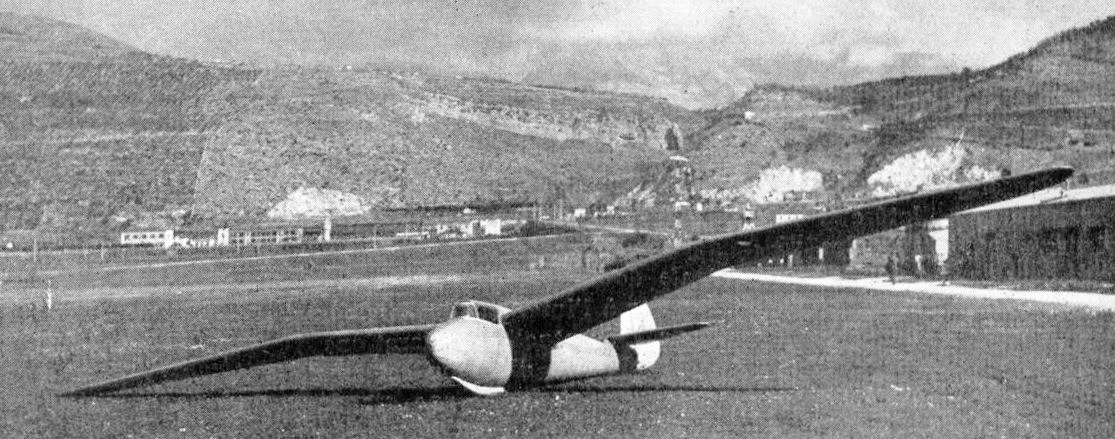

General information
- Type: Single seat Olympic glider
- National origin: Italy
- Designer: Ermenegildo Preti
- Number built: probably 1

History
- First flight: January or February 1939

The CVV-4 Pellicano (English: Pelican) was a single seat Italian glider designed for a competition to select an aircraft for the 1940 Olympic Games. The DFS Olympia Meise was preferred to it after the trials in Italy in 1939.

== Design and development ==
The CVV-4 Pellicano was one of two Italian designs competing to become the preferred Olympic glider at the 1940 Olympic Games. Had they happened, these Games would have been the first to host a gliding event. It was planned that all competitors should fly the same 15 m (49 ft 3 in) span type and designs from Germany, France, Italy, the Netherlands and the United Kingdom were evaluated for the role at Sezze in Italy in February 1939.

The Pellicano was designed by the Centro Studi ed Ezperienze per il Volo a Vela (CVV) of the Politecnico di Milano, who had a tradition of glider development. A typical late 1930s glider, it had an all wood frame and was covered with a mixture of plywood and fabric. The Pellicano was a mid-wing monoplane, with significant dihedral on the centre section forming a gull wing, rather fashionable at the time. In plan the wing was straight tapered, with rounded tips. It was built around a ply covered D-box leading edge with fabric covering aft. Ailerons occupied the whole trailing edge of the outer, zero dihedral section and there were mid-chord airbrakes, opening above and below the wings, towards the outer end of the centre section. At the wing root the plywood skin extended to the trailing edge. The choice of NACA rather than Göttingen airfoils, the former less cambered and so faster, was a little unusual.

The Pellicano had an oval cross-section, ply skinned monocoque fuselage tapering rearwards. The narrow chord fixed rear surfaces were ply covered with the tailplane mounted on top of the fuselage and forward of the fin. The control surfaces were fabric covered and the rudder, broad and deep, moved in a gap between the elevators. The pilot sat ahead of the leading edge of the wing under a multi-piece canopy with a rather upright windscreen and which merged into the upper fuselage aft. There was no landing wheel, just a skid which ended under the wings and a very small tail skid.

== Operational history ==
The Pellicano took part in the olympic competition held in Sezze Littoria, near Rome in February 1939, have only just made its first flight and with little further testing. It was not successful as the German DFS Olympia Meise was chosen for the Olympic event and, though this did not take place, went into post-World War II production in several European countries. The Pellicano remained a popular aircraft locally though production numbers are uncertain. Another source says that only the single prototype, I-ABNJ, was built and it the only one on the official records.

== Specifications ==
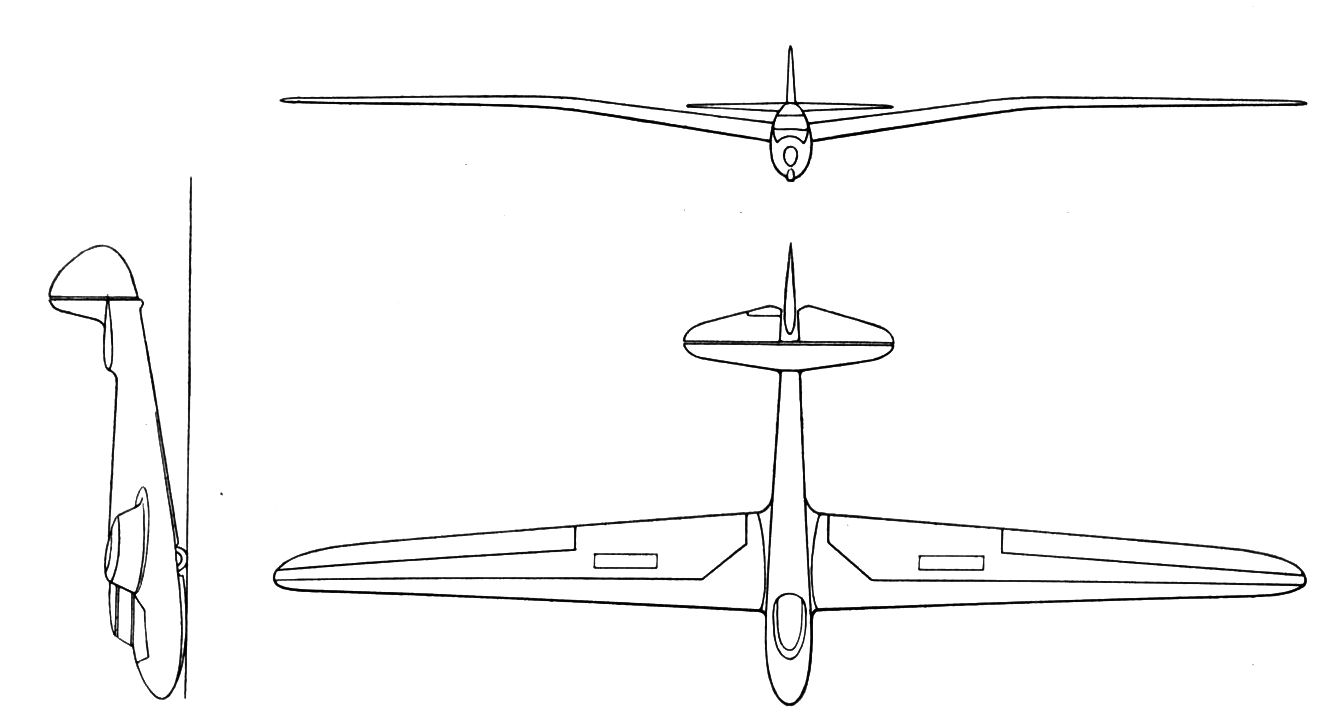
CVV-4 Pellicano 3-view drawing from L'Aerophile May 1939

Data from Sailplanes 1920–1945

General characteristics

- Crew: One
- Length: 6.60 m (21 ft 8 in)
- Wingspan: 15.00 m (49 ft 3 in)
- Wing area: 14.7 m^{2} (158 sq ft)
- Aspect ratio: 15.3
- Airfoil: root: NACA 2416; mid-span: NACA 2412; tip: NACA 0012
- Empty weight: 160 kg (353 lb) structure
- Gross weight: 255 kg (562 lb)

Performance

- Maximum glide ratio: 23:1
- Rate of sink: 0.7 m/s (140 ft/min) minimum
- Wing loading: 17.3 kg/m^{2} (3.5 lb/sq ft)
