= CVT M-300 =

Single-seat glider

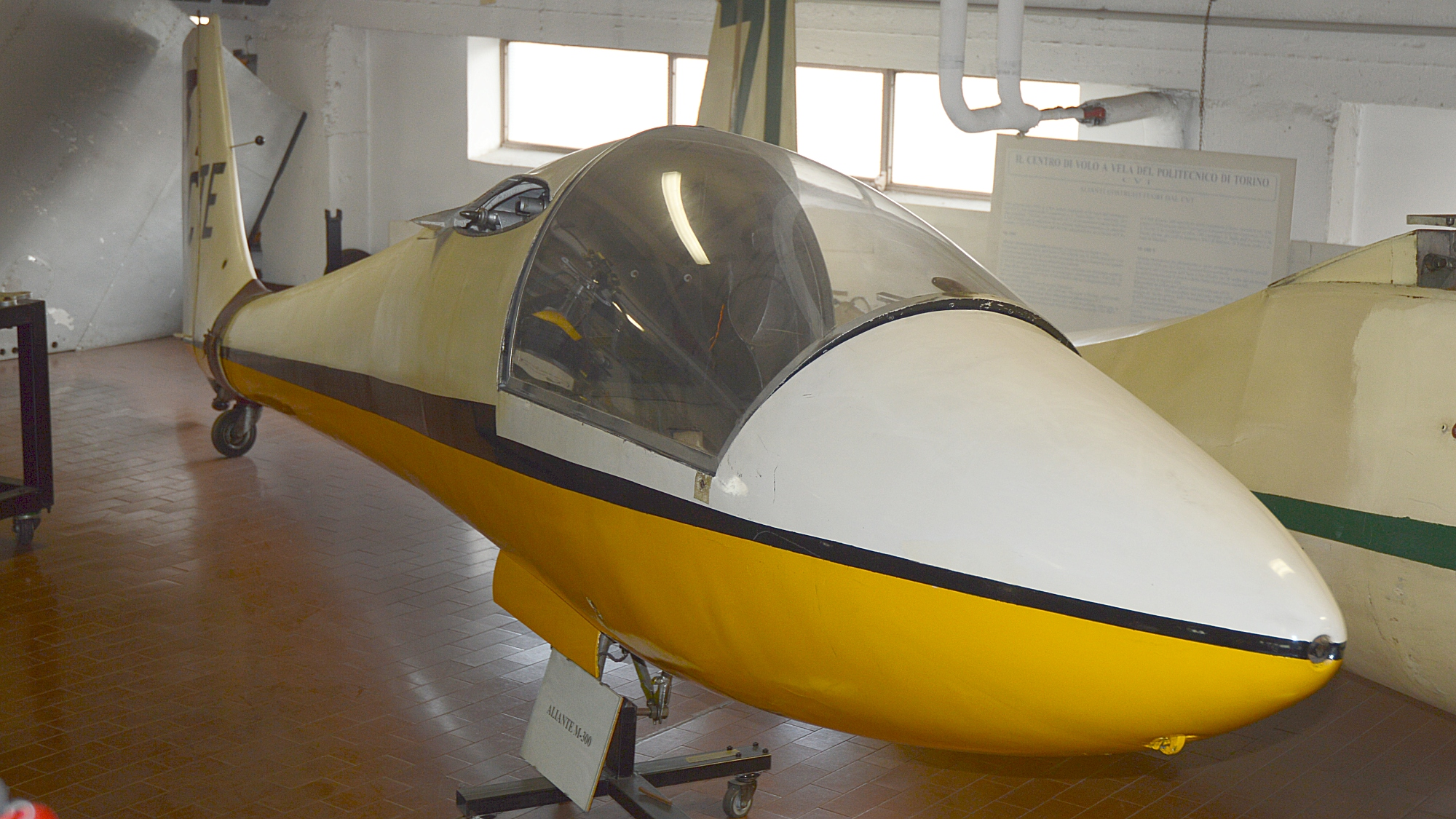

General information
- Type: Glider
- National origin: Italy
- Manufacturer: Centro di Volo a Vela
- Designer: Alberto Morelli
- Number built: 2

History
- First flight: April 1968

The CVT M-300 was a single-seat glider designed and built in Italy from 1967.

== Development ==
Designed by Alberto Morelli, this single-seat high-performance standard class glider was intended for competition flying, record breaking and club use. Advanced constructional techniques used for the plywood skinned, aluminium alloy sparred, M-300 wings ensured accurate surfaces with high-quality surface finish. The fuselage was conventionally built using wooden frames, plywood skinning with a glass-fibre nose cone, and integral swept fin which supported the narrow chord all-flying tailplane. Two prototypes were built with the first flight taking place in April 1968.

== Specifications ==
Data from Coates, Andrew. “Jane's World Sailplanes & Motor Gliders new edition”. London, Jane's. 1980. ISBN 0-7106-0017-8

General characteristics

- Crew: 1
- Length: 6.39 m (20 ft 11.5 in)
- Wingspan: 15 m (49 ft 2.5 in)
- Wing area: 9.16 m^{2} (98.6 sq ft)
- Aspect ratio: 24.7:1
- Empty weight: 190 kg (419 lb)
- Gross weight: 300 kg (661 lb)

Performance

- Maximum speed: 250 km/h (155 mph, 135 kn)
- Stall speed: 71 km/h (44.3 mph, 38.5 kn)
- Maximum glide ratio: 38
- Rate of sink: 0.62 m/s (120 ft/min) at 79 km/h (43 kn)

== See also ==
Related development

- CVT M-100 single-seat glider
- CVT M-200 two-seat glider

Aircraft of comparable role, configuration, and era

- Pilatus B-4
- Schneider ES-60 Boomerang single-seat glider designed and built in Australia

Related lists

- List of aircraft
- List of gliders
