= Morelli M-100 =

Italian single-seat sailplane

M-100
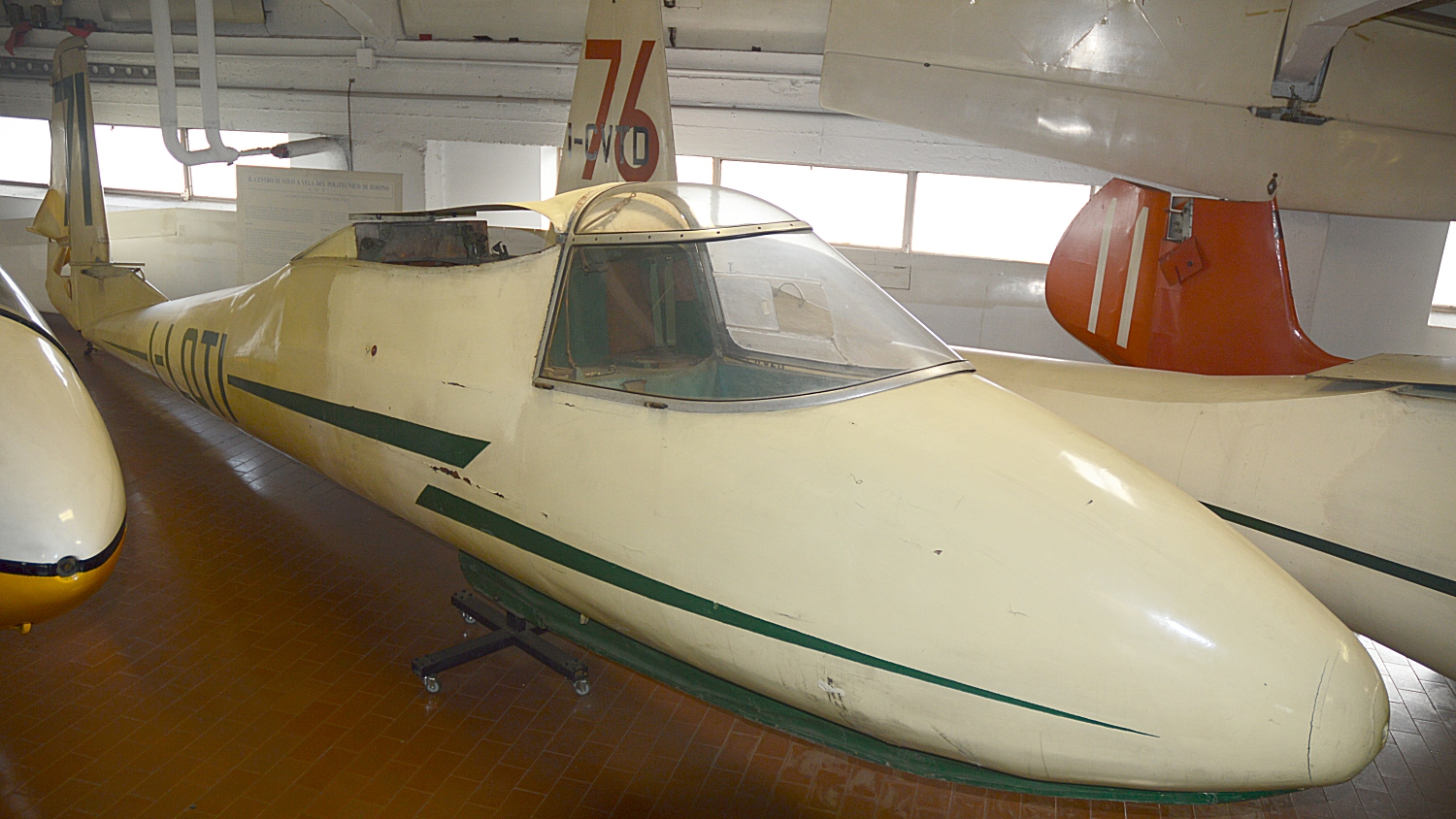

General information
- Type: Glider
- National origin: Italy
- Manufacturer: Aeromere, CVT, Avionautica Rio and CARMAM
- Designer: Alberto & Piero Morelli
- Number built: 223

History
- First flight: 1957

External image
- M-100S “Mesange”

The Aer-Pegaso M-100 was a single-seat glider designed and built in Italy from 1957.

== Development ==
The Morelli M-100 was a single-seat sailplane designed in response to a 1956 competition sponsored by the Aero Club d'Italia for a low-cost training glider. The winning design, by Prof. Ing. Piero Morelli, was put into production the following year. As originally designed, the M-100 was of conventional, high-wing sailplane configuration, with a stubby T-tail.

In 1958, the FAI published the new Standard Class rules for sailplanes, and since the M-100 was close to this specification, the design was modified to comply. This involved numerous changes to the wing, including lengthening and thickening the structure, and adding larger and more numerous rotating airbrake segments. The tail unit was revised too, and given a conventional fin. This version was designated the M-100S.

The M-100 and M-100S were manufactured by Aeromere, CVT, Avionautica Rio in Italy, and S.A. CARMAM, in France as the CARMAM M-100S Mésange (tomtit). Eighty three aircraft were built in Italy and a further 140 at CARMAM in France.

== Variants ==
Morelli M-100
A generic designation for all variants.
CVT M-100
Prototype and initial production at the Centro di Volo a Vela del Politecnico di Torino (CVT) in Turin, in the Ditta Nicolotti & Figli factory in Turin.
Morelli M-100S
A substantial re-design to comply with new Standard class specifications issued in 1957.
Aeromere M-100S
The bulk of production from the Aeromere factory.
Avionautica Rio M-100S
Alternative production in Italy
CARMAM M-100S Mésange (Tomtit)
Production at the CARMAM (Coopérative d'Approvisionnement et de Réparation de Matériel Aéronautique de Moulins) factory in France, (140 built).
Aer-Pegaso M-100S
Another designation for some aircraft built in Italy.

== Specifications (M-100S) ==
Data from The World's Sailplanes:Die Segelflugzeuge der Welt:Les Planeurs du Monde Volume II, The World's Sailplanes:Die Segelflugzeuge der Welt:Les Planeurs du Monde

General characteristics

- Crew: 1
- Length: 6.56 m (21 ft 6 in)

(M-100: 6.7 m (22 ft))

- Wingspan: 15 m (49 ft 3 in)

(M-100: 14 m (46 ft))

- Height: 1.6 m (5 ft 3 in)
- Wing area: 13.1 m^{2} (141 sq ft)

(M-100: 14 m^{2} (150 sq ft))

- Aspect ratio: 17.1:1

(M-100: 16)

- Airfoil: root – NACA 63-618, tip – NACA 63-615

(M-100: - NACA 63-613, mid – NACA 63-612.3, tip – NACA 4412)

- Empty weight: 198 kg (437 lb)

(M-100: 155 kg (342 lb))

- Gross weight: 315 kg (694 lb)
- Max takeoff weight: 315 kg (694 lb)

(M-100: 257 kg (567 lb))

Performance

- Stall speed: 51 km/h (32 mph, 28 kn)
- Never exceed speed: 230 km/h (140 mph, 120 kn)

(M-100: 180 km/h (110 mph; 97 kn))

- Rough air speed max: 140 km/h (87.0 mph; 75.6 kn)
- Aerotow speed: 90–150 km/h (55.9–93.2 mph; 48.6–81.0 kn)

(M-100: 150 km/h (93 mph; 81 kn))

- Terminal velocity: with full airbrakes 190 km/h (118 mph; 103 kn)

(M-100: 130 km/h (81 mph; 70 kn))

- g limits: +4.5 -2.25 at 126 km/h (78.3 mph; 68.0 kn), +3.38 -0 at 250 km/h (155.3 mph; 135.0 kn)
- Maximum glide ratio: 32 at 77 km/h (47.8 mph; 41.6 kn)
- Rate of sink: 0.62 m/s (122 ft/min) at 67 km/h (41.6 mph; 36.2 kn)
- Wing loading: 24 kg/m^{2} (4.9 lb/sq ft)

(M-100: 21 kg/m^{2} (4.3 lb/sq ft))

== See also ==
Related development

- CVT M-200 two-seat glider designed by Prof. Morelli
- CVT M-300 single-seat glider designed by Prof. Morelli

Aircraft of comparable role, configuration, and era

- EoN Olympia 463
- Slingsby Dart
- Schneider ES-60 Boomerang glider designed and built in Australia

Related lists

- List of gliders
