= CARMAM Aiglon =

Single seat French glider, 1974

15-36 Aiglon

General information
- Type: Standard Class sailplane
- Manufacturer: CARMAM
- Designer: Robert Jaquet and Jean Pottier
- Number built: c.50 by 1980

History
- First flight: 14 June 1974

The CARMAM 15-36 Aiglon ("Eaglet") was a French sailplane produced in the 1970s. It was designed as a private venture by the technical directors of CARMAM, intending it to be a simple and easy-to-fly basic glider for aeroclub use. It was a conventional sailplane design of fibreglass construction throughout, with a low tail.

A variant was also marketed for homebuilding as the 15-34 Kit-Club. Pottier revised the original design to simplify it somewhat, and replaced much of the fibreglass structure with a plywood fuselage and fabric-covered wing and tail. These structural changes resulted in a weight penalty of around 30 kg (66 lb), but performance remained very similar.

== Variants ==
15-36A
basic production version
15-36AR
15-36A with provision for 55 kg (121 lb) of water ballast
15-34
15-36A redesigned for homebuilding

== Specifications (15-36A) ==
General characteristics

- Crew: One pilot
- Length: 6.40 m (21 ft 0 in)
- Wingspan: 15.00 m (49 ft 3 in)
- Height: 1.4 m (4 ft 7 in)
- Wing area: 11.0 m^{2} (118 sq ft)
- Aspect ratio: 20.4
- Empty weight: 200 kg (441 lb)
- Gross weight: 390 kg (860 lb)

Performance

- Maximum speed: 240 km/h (150 mph, 130 kn)
- Maximum glide ratio: 37:1
- Rate of sink: 0.60 m/s (118 ft/min)
