= CVV 1 Pinguino =

Italian glider

Pinguino

General information
- Type: High performance single seat glider
- National origin: Italy
- Manufacturer: Centro Volo a Vela, Milan (CVV)
- Designer: Ermenegildo Preti and Maurizio Garbell
- Number built: probably 1

History
- First flight: December 1937

The CVV1 Pinguino (English: Penguin) was a single seat, high performance glider designed and built in Italy in the mid-1930s, the first of a series of gliders from the Milan Polytechnic. It did not go into production.

== Design and development ==
The Pinguino was the first design from the Centro Volo a Vela (CVV), or Experimental Soaring Centre, of the Royal Polytechnic of Milan. Ermenegildo Preti was only eighteen when he began the design. It was a wood and fabric aircraft, a cantilever, gull winged monoplane in the manner of the slightly earlier German DFS Rhönsperber. The mid mounted wing was built around a single spar with a plywood covered D-box ahead of it and fabric behind. In plan, it had a constant chord centre section, filling about a third of the span, and outer sections with taper on both leading and trailing edges ending in semi-elliptical tips. The centre section had positive dihedral but there was none on the outer panels. Ailerons occupied the whole of these outer panels, hinged parallel to the trailing edge. Short span airbrakes extended upwards only, mounted just behind the spar at the outer ends of the centre section.

The fuselage of the Pinguino was blunt nosed and steadily tapering ventrally aft, with a ply covering formed by twenty round frames and six longerons. A slight step held the narrow tailplane just above the fuselage, far enough forward that the trailing edge of the fabric covered split elevator was ahead of the rudder hinge. Neither rear control surface was balanced. Like the tailplane, fin was also narrow but the fabric covered rudder was broad, with a curved edge that reached down to the keel, protected by an integral tail bumper. The main landing gear was a wooden skid mounted on rubber shock absorbers. The pilot sat at the wing leading edge under a protuberant, multipiece glazed canopy of teardrop form.

The first flight of the Pinguino was made in December 1937 from Arcore. No production followed.

== Operational history ==
The Pinguino competed in the second National Meeting held at Asiago in 1938.

== Specifications ==
Data from Italian Vintage Sailplanes

General characteristics

- Crew: One
- Length: 6.50 m (21 ft 4 in)
- Wingspan: 15.30 m (50 ft 2 in)
- Wing area: 15.20 m^{2} (163.6 sq ft)
- Aspect ratio: 15
- Airfoil: Root Göttingen 535, tip NACA 23012
- Empty weight: 190 kg (419 lb)
- Gross weight: 270 kg (595 lb)

Performance

- Maximum glide ratio: estimated 25:1
- Rate of sink: 0.7 m/s (140 ft/min) minimum
- Wing loading: 17.70 kg/m^{2} (3.63 lb/sq ft)
