= CVT2 Veltro =

Italian competition glider

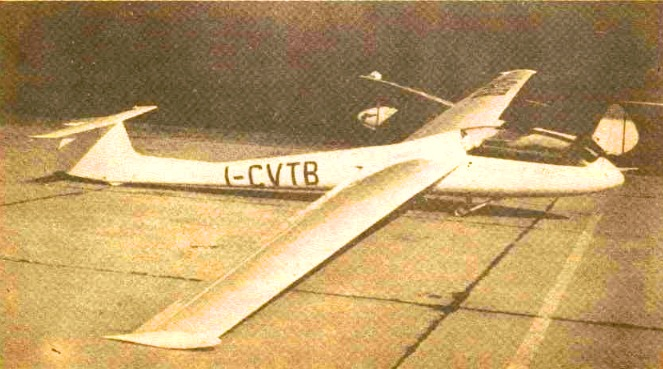

General information
- Type: High performance sailplane
- National origin: Italy
- Manufacturer: Soaring Centre of the Polytechnic of Turin (CVT)
- Designer: Alberto & Pietro Morelli
- Number built: 1

History
- First flight: 9 September 1954

The CVT2 Veltro (English: Greyhound) was an Italian competition glider built in the mid-1950s. Its advanced design incorporated a laminar flow wing, T-tail, retracting undercarriage and a reclining seat to reduce parasitic drag.

== Design and development ==
The high performance Veltro Italian sailplane was one of a group of gliders designed and built internationally in 1953-4 using 6 series, laminar flow NACA airfoils, following the successful 1950 Ross-Johnson RJ-5 from the US. It was designed by the Morelli brothers and completed in just eight months.

The Veltro was a wooden, shoulder wing cantilever monoplane, with a 15 m (49 ft 3 in) span wing which was straight tapered in plan and had an aspect ratio of 18:1. Its wing was constructed around a main box spar and a lighter auxiliary spar and was made in three pieces, with a central panel 7.0 m (23 ft 0 in) long. The wing was skinned with 2 mm (0.08 in) thick plywood, apart from the tight radius leading edge which was made of carefully shaped balsa wood glued to a forward false spar. The trailing edges carried fabric covered slotted ailerons outboard and ply covered slotted flaps which at low deflection angles acted as camber changing, lift increasing devices to increase the speed range and at higher angles (>60°) acted as airbrakes. The wing tips were fitted with tip bodies 700 mm (27.6 in) long and 120 mm (4.7 in) in diameter.

The Veltro's slender fuselage was shaped with circular formers and four longerons and skinned with plywood, forming a semi-monocoque structure. The wing was attached with a pair of tapered pins on each side. Forward of the wing a long, one piece perspex canopy reaching almost to the nose covered the cockpit, in which the pilot had a reclining seat to reduce the overall cross sectional area. This was a novelty at the time. Initially, the glider was fitted with an "Orthocinétique" control system, where pitch, roll and yaw were all controlled from a control column fitted with a handlebar; the pilot's feet were then free to operate flaps or undercarriage. This system was never flown. Behind the wing the fuselage had a circular cross-section, tapering to a then novel T-tail. The horizontal tail, straight tapered with ply covered tailplane and fabric covered elevator, was positioned on top of an unusually low aspect ratio ply skinned fin and fabric covered rudder. Flight testing showed the tailplane, out of the wing wake, worked well but the rudder tended to lock in side slips. This problem was cured with the addition of a dorsal fin and yaw control was later improved with a double slotted rudder, hinged well ahead of the fin trailing edge.

The undercarriage was retractable, with a pair of small wheels on the end of a trailing arm, each fitted with a vertical shock absorber; the arm was slightly kinked to tuck the wheels almost entirely within the fuselage when retracted and also to act as a protective skid on rough ground. There was a small tail bumper.

== Operational history ==
Antonio Angeloni piloted the Veltro on its first flight on 9 September 1954 from Turin. It did not attend the 1954 or 1956 World Gliding Championships but did compete in the Italian Nationals of 1957 and 1958. On 3 March 1956 Alberto Morelli flew it to an altitude of 7,500 m (24,610 ft) using wave lift over mountains around the Susa Valley. In August 1957 it set a new Italian distance record, flying 300 km (186 mi) between Rieti and Barletta. Though only one Veltro was built and the opportunity of international exposure lost, it was nonetheless an influential design.

== Specifications ==
Data from The World's Sailplanes (1958) pp.152-5

General characteristics

- Crew: One
- Length: 6.9 m (22 ft 8 in)
- Wingspan: 15.00 m (49 ft 3 in)
- Wing area: 12.5 m^{2} (135 sq ft)
- Aspect ratio: 18
- Airfoil: NACA 64_{2}515 at root, 64_{1}512 at tip
- Empty weight: 176 kg (388 lb)
- Max takeoff weight: 266 kg (586 lb)

Performance

- Stall speed: 57 km/h (35 mph, 31 kn)
- Never exceed speed: 200 km/h (120 mph, 110 kn) placard
- g limits: +4.5 / -2.25 at ~120 km/h (75 mph; 65 kn) and +3.38 / 0 at 200 km/h (124 mph; 108 kn)
- Maximum glide ratio: 35 at 72 km/h (45 mph; 39 kn)
- Rate of sink: 0.50 m/s (98 ft/min) minimum, at 60 km/h (37 mph; 32 kn)
- Wing loading: 21.3 kg/m^{2} (4.4 lb/sq ft)
