= List of Cessna models =

The following is a list of Cessna aircraft models:

== Cessna ==
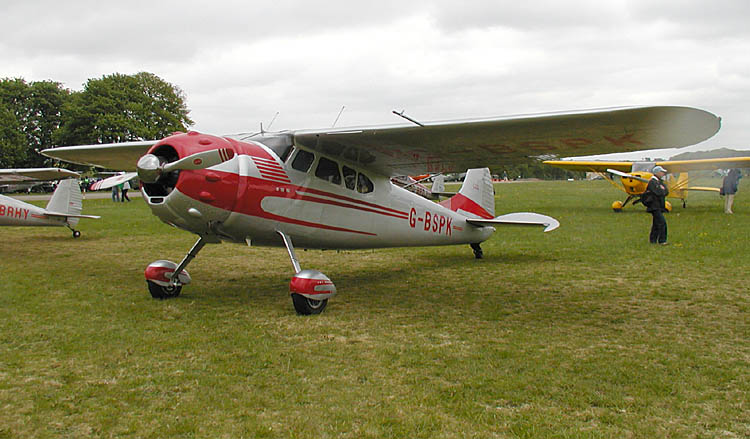
Cessna 195

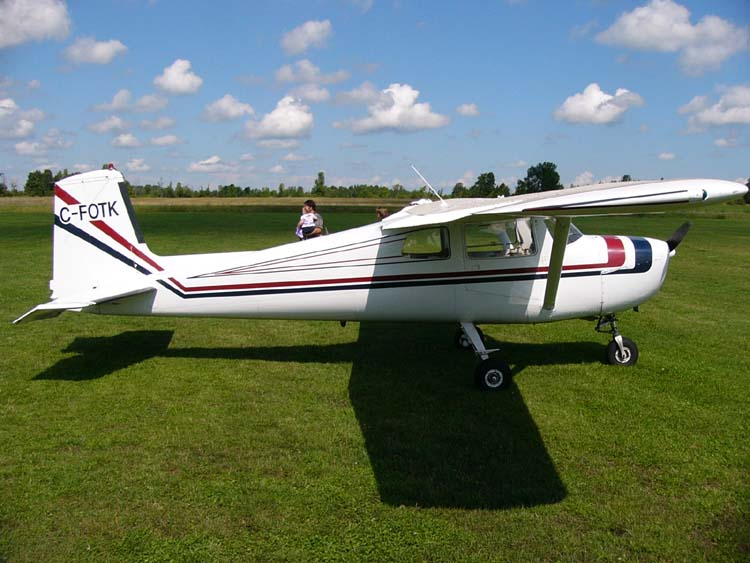
Cessna 150B

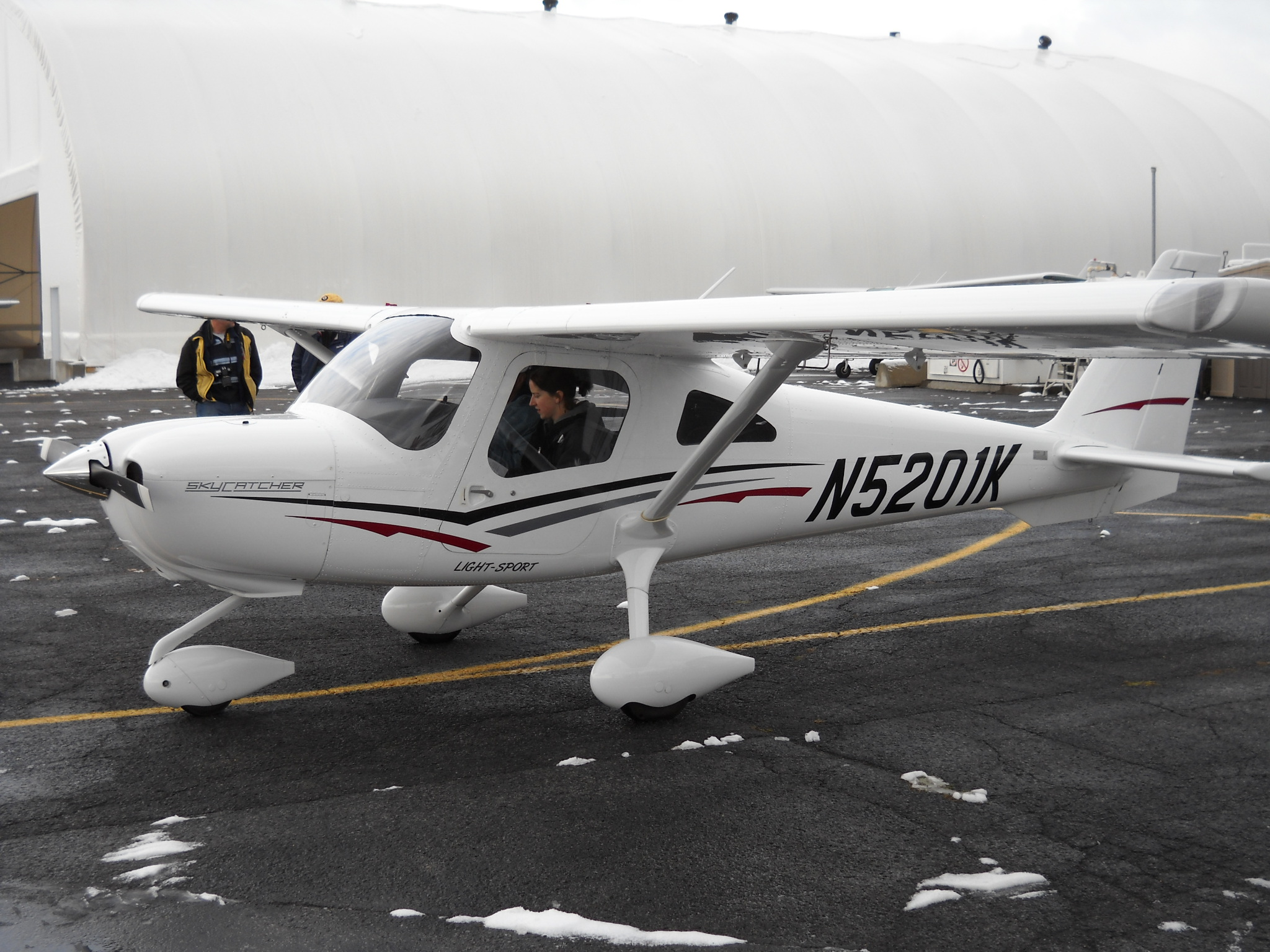
Cessna 162 Skycatcher

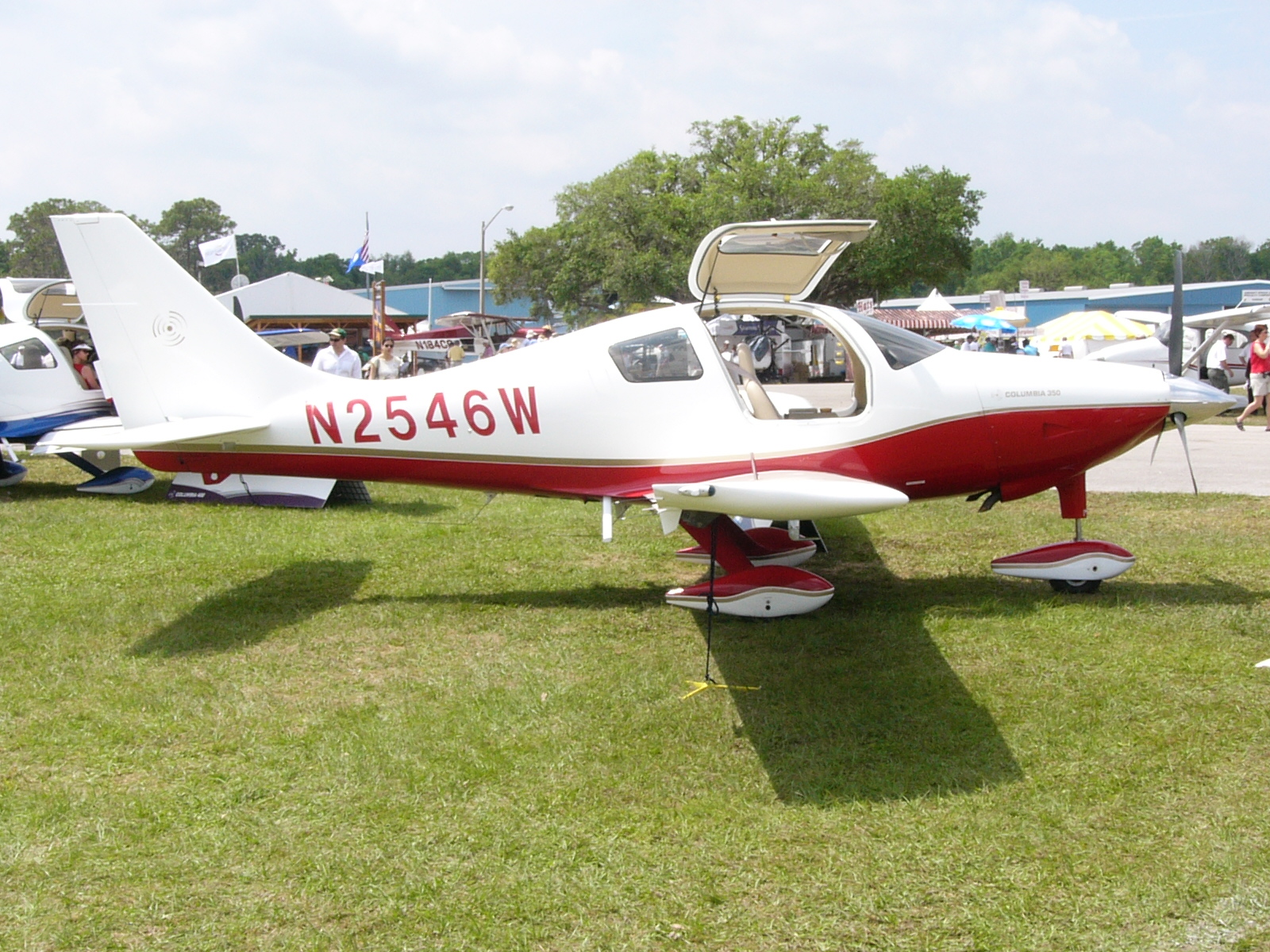
Cessna 350

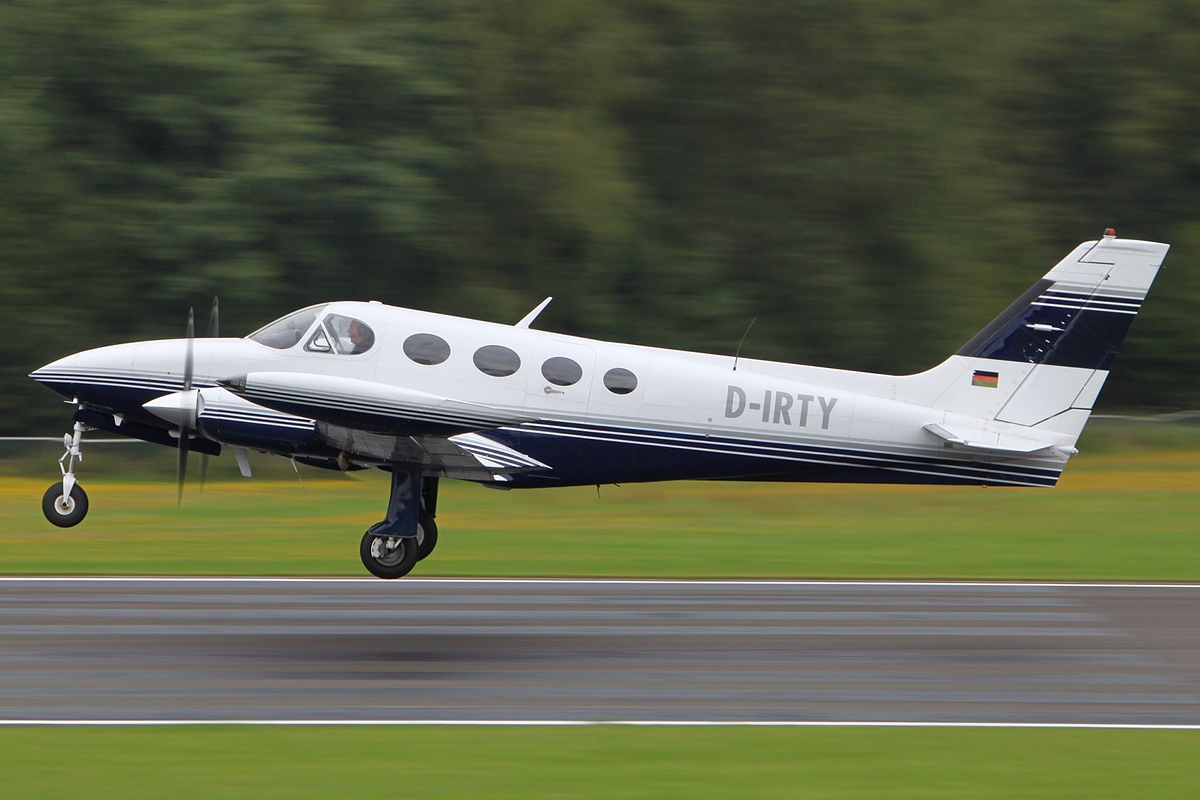
Cessna 340A

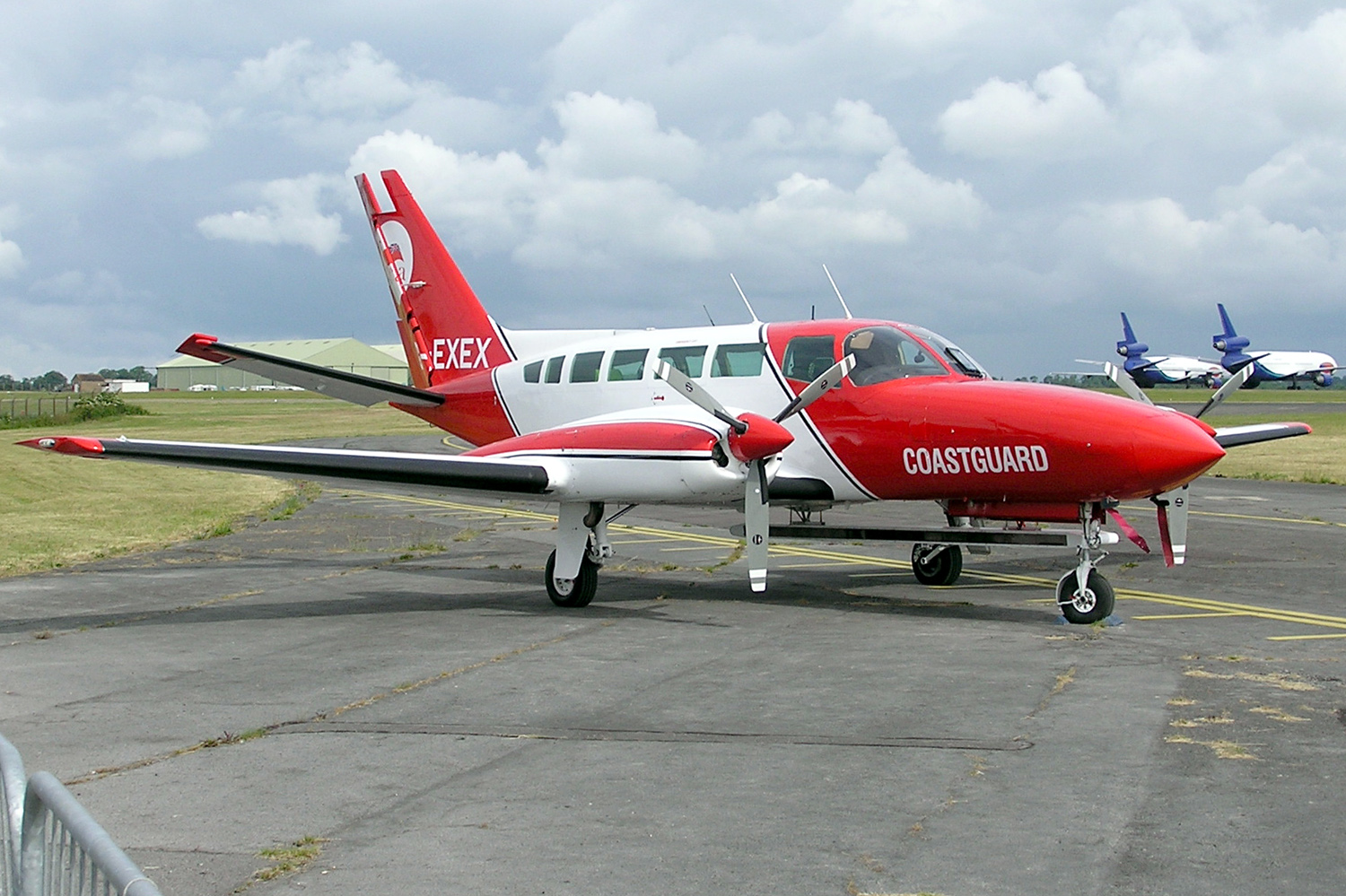
Cessna 404 Titan II

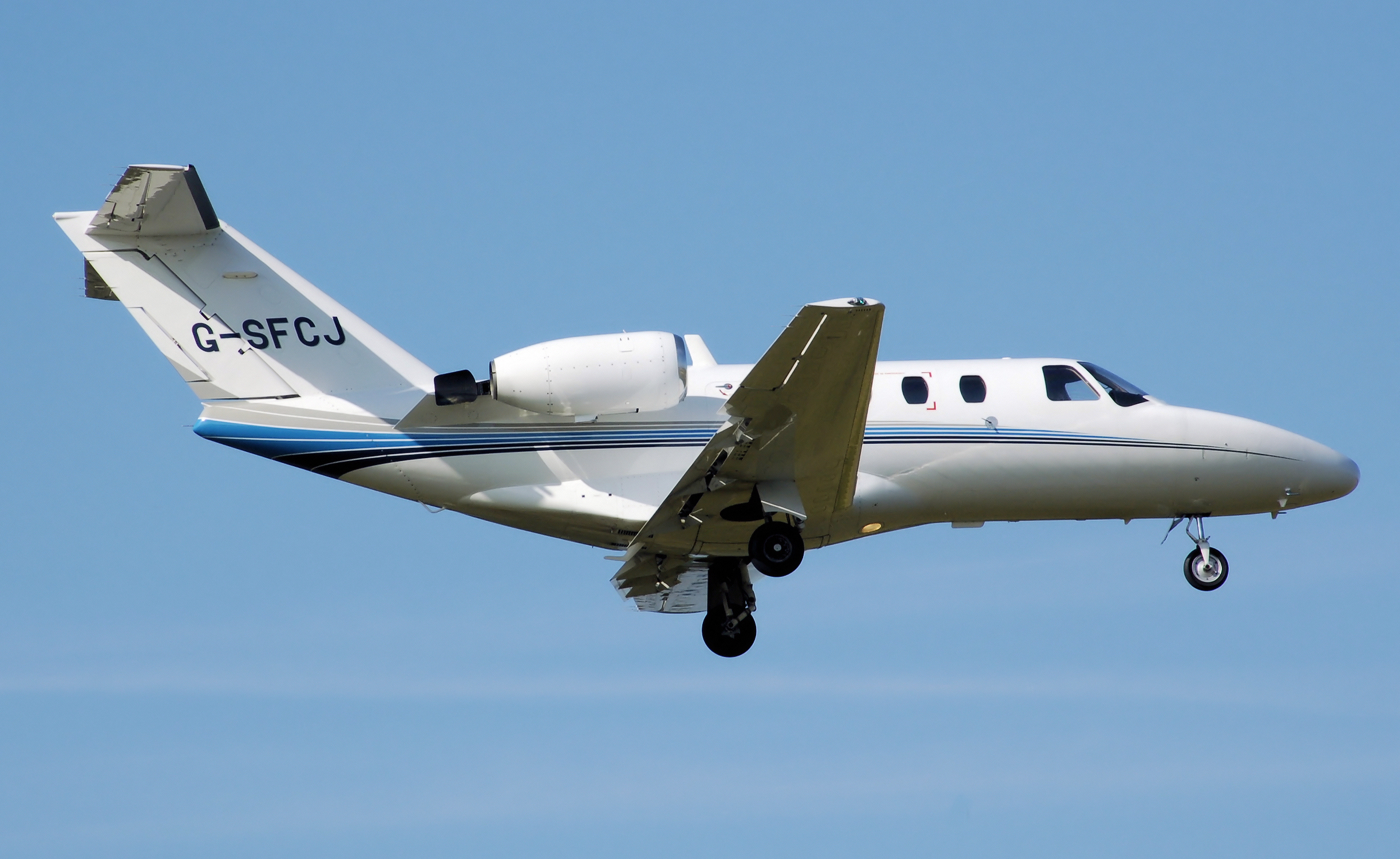
Cessna 525 CitationJet

Model name	First flight	Number built	Type
Cessna Comet	1917	1	Single piston engine monoplane sport plane
Cessna Model A	1927	70	Single piston engine monoplane utility airplane
Cessna Model BW		13	Single piston engine monoplane utility airplane
Cessna CG-2			Glider
Cessna CH-1	1953	~50	Single piston engine utility helicopter
Cessna CH-4			Single piston engine utility helicopter
Cessna CR-1		1	Single piston engine monoplane racer
Cessna CR-2	1930	1	Single piston engine monoplane racer
Cessna CR-3	1933	1	Single piston engine monoplane racer
Cessna CW-6	1928		Single piston engine monoplane utility airplane
Cessna C-34 Airmaster	1935	42	Single piston engine monoplane utility airplane
Cessna Model C-37		46	Single piston engine monoplane utility airplane
Cessna Model C-38		16	Single piston engine monoplane utility airplane
Cessna Model C-39			Single piston engine monoplane utility airplane
Cessna Model C-145			Single piston engine monoplane utility airplane
Cessna Model C-165			Single piston engine monoplane utility airplane
Cessna Model EC-1		2	Single piston engine monoplane utility airplane
Cessna Model EC-2		2	Single piston engine monoplane utility airplane
Cessna DC-6	1929		Single piston engine monoplane utility airplane
Cessna NGP	2006	1	Prototype single piston engine monoplane utility airplane
Cessna O-1 Bird Dog (Note: Factory model number 305. Designated L-19 or OE prior to implementation of the 1962 United States Tri-Service aircraft designation system.)	1949	3,431	Single piston engine monoplane observation airplane
Cessna T-50 (Note: Designated AT-17 Bobcat, UC-78 Bobcat, or JRC by U.S. military.)	1939	5,422	Twin piston engine monoplane utility airplane
Cessna 120	1946		Single piston engine monoplane utility airplane
Cessna 140	1945		Single piston engine monoplane utility airplane
Cessna 142	1957	1	Prototype single piston engine monoplane utility airplane
Cessna 150	1957	23,839	Single piston engine monoplane utility airplane
Cessna 152		7,584	Single piston engine monoplane utility airplane
Cessna 160	1962	1	Prototype single piston engine monoplane utility airplane
Cessna 162 Skycatcher	2006	275	Single piston engine monoplane utility airplane
Cessna 170	1948	5,174	Single piston engine monoplane utility airplane
Cessna 172 Skyhawk	1955	44,000+	Single piston engine monoplane utility airplane
Cessna 175 Skylark	1956	2,106	Single piston engine monoplane utility airplane
Cessna 177 Cardinal	1966	4,295	Single piston engine monoplane utility airplane
Cessna 180 Skywagon	1952	6,193	Single piston engine monoplane utility airplane
Cessna 182 Skylane	1955	23,237+	Single piston engine monoplane utility airplane
Cessna 185 Skywagon	1960	4,400+	Single piston engine monoplane utility airplane
Cessna 187	1968	1	Prototype single piston engine monoplane utility airplane
Cessna 188	1965	3,976	Single piston engine monoplane agricultural airplane
Cessna 190			Single piston engine monoplane utility airplane
Cessna 195			Single piston engine monoplane utility airplane
Cessna 205		576	Single piston engine monoplane utility airplane
Cessna 206			Single piston engine monoplane utility airplane
Cessna 207		626	Single piston engine monoplane utility airplane
Cessna 208 Caravan	1982	3,000	Single engine turboprop monoplane utility airplane
Cessna X210	1950	1	Prototype single piston engine monoplane utility airplane
Cessna 210 Centurion	1957	9,240	Single piston engine monoplane utility airplane
Cessna P260	1943	2	Twin piston engine monoplane cargo airplane
Cessna T240			Single piston engine monoplane utility airplane
Cessna T303 Crusader	1978	297	Twin piston engine monoplane utility airplane
Cessna 308	1951	1	Single piston engine monoplane utility airplane
Cessna 309		4	Experimental single piston engine monoplane utility airplane
Cessna 310	1953	5,449	Twin piston engine monoplane utility airplane
Cessna 318	1954	1,269	Twin jet engine monoplane trainer
Cessna 319		1	Single piston engine monoplane observation airplane
Cessna 320 Skyknight		577	Twin piston engine monoplane utility airplane
Cessna 321		27	Single piston engine monoplane observation airplane
Cessna 325		2	Single piston engine monoplane agricultural airplane
Cessna 327		1	Twin piston engine monoplane utility airplane
Cessna 330			Twin piston engine monoplane utility airplane
Cessna 335		65	Twin piston engine monoplane utility airplane
Cessna 336 Skymaster	1961	197	Twin piston engine monoplane utility airplane
Cessna 337 Skymaster			Twin piston engine monoplane utility airplane
Cessna 340	1970	1,298	Twin piston engine monoplane utility airplane
Cessna 343	N/A	0	Prototype single piston engine monoplane utility airplane
Cessna 350 Corvalis			Single piston engine monoplane utility airplane
Cessna E350		1	Prototype single turboprop engine utility airplane
Cessna 400 Corvalis TT			Single piston engine monoplane utility airplane
Cessna 401	1965		Twin piston engine monoplane utility airplane
Cessna 402			Twin piston engine monoplane utility airplane
Cessna 404 Titan	1975	396	Twin piston engine monoplane utility airplane
Cessna 407	N/A	0	Unbuilt twin jet engine monoplane business airplane
Cessna 408 SkyCourier	2020	47	Twin turboprop engine monoplane utility airplane
Cessna 411	1962	302	Twin piston engine monoplane utility airplane
Cessna 414	1968	1,070	Twin piston engine monoplane utility airplane
Cessna 421 Golden Eagle	1965	1,916	Twin piston engine monoplane utility airplane
Cessna 425	1978	236	Twin turboprop engine monoplane utility airplane
Cessna 435			Unbuilt twin piston engine monoplane utility airplane
Cessna 441 Conquest II	1977	362	Twin turboprop engine monoplane utility airplane
Cessna 500 Citation I (Note: Initially marketed as the Citation 500 or simply the Citation.)	1969		Twin jet engine monoplane business airplane
Cessna 501 Citation I/SP		303	Twin jet engine monoplane business airplane
Cessna 510 Citation Mustang	2005	479	Twin jet engine monoplane business airplane
Cessna 525 CitationJet (Note: Upgraded versions marketed as Citation M2 and Citation Gen2/Gen3.)	1991	2,000+	Twin jet engine monoplane business airplane
Cessna 526 CitationJet	1993	2	Twin jet engine monoplane trainer
Cessna E530	2013	4	Twin jet engine monoplane multirole military airplane
Cessna 550 Citation II	1977		Twin jet engine monoplane business airplane
Cessna 551 Citation II/SP		94	Twin jet engine monoplane business airplane
Cessna 552 (Note: Produced exclusively for U.S. Navy as T-47A.)	1984	15	Twin jet engine monoplane trainer
Cessna S550 Citation S/II	1984	145	Twin jet engine monoplane business airplane
Cessna 560 Citation V (Note: Designated OT-47B or UC-35 by U.S. military.)	1987	774	Twin jet engine monoplane business airplane
Cessna Citation 560XL Excel (Note: Upgraded versions marketed as Citation XLS, Citation XLS+ and Citation Ascend.)	1996	1,000+	Twin jet engine monoplane business airplane
Cessna 620	1956	1	Four piston engine monoplane business airplane
Cessna 650 Citation III	1979	202	Twin jet engine monoplane business airplane
Cessna 650 Citation VI	1991	39	Twin jet engine monoplane business airplane
Cessna 650 Citation VII	1991	119	Twin jet engine monoplane business airplane
Cessna 670 Citation IV	N/A	0	Unbuilt twin jet engine monoplane business airplane
Cessna 680 Citation Sovereign	2002	443	Twin jet engine monoplane business airplane
Cessna 680A Citation Latitude	2014	359+	Twin jet engine monoplane business airplane
Cessna 700 Citation Longitude	2016	100+	Twin jet engine monoplane business airplane
Cessna 750 Citation X	1993	339	Twin jet engine monoplane business airplane
Cessna 850 Citation Columbus	N/A	0	Unbuilt twin jet engine monoplane business airplane
Cessna 1014 XMC	1971	1	Experimental single piston engine monoplane utility airplane
Cessna 1023	1971	1	Experimental single piston engine military airplane
Cessna Citation Hemisphere	N/A	0	Unbuilt twin jet engine monoplane business airplane

== Reims-Cessna ==
The following Cessna models were built by Reims Aviation:

Model name	First flight	Number built	Type
Reims-Cessna F150		1,764	Single piston engine monoplane utility airplane
Reims-Cessna F152		641	Single piston engine monoplane utility airplane
Reims-Cessna F172		2,932 (Note: Includes 3 FP172s and 675 FR172s.)	Single piston engine monoplane utility airplane
Reims Cessna F177		177	Single piston engine monoplane utility airplane
Reims Cessna F182		237	Single piston engine monoplane utility airplane
Reims Cessna F337		169	Twin piston engine monoplane utility airplane
Reims Cessna F406 Caravan II (Note: The F406 was based on the Cessna 404 but was produced exclusively by Reims; there was no equivalent Cessna model.)	1983	99	Twin turboprop engine monoplane utility airplane

== See also ==
- Beechcraft Denali – a single-engine turboprop business aircraft marketed as a Cessna prior to the prototype stage
