= CR1 =

CR1 or CR-1 may refer to:

== Vehicles ==
=== Aircraft ===
- Cessna CR-1, an American air racer
- Fiat CR.1, a 1920s Italian biplane fighter aircraft

=== Automobiles ===
- Climax CR1, a 2015 British sports car
- Aquila CR1, a 2008–present Danish race car

== Other uses ==
- Complement receptor 1, a protein
- CR-1 visa, a United States immigrant visa that allows a spouse of a US citizen to enter as a conditional permanent resident
- CR-1 gene is about Teratocarcinoma-derived growth factor 1
