= Angela Deem =

American TV personality (born 1965)

- Born: Angela Kaye Standridge; December 9, 1965 (age 60)
- Occupations: Television personality, nursing assistant.
- Known for: 90 Day Fiancé
- Spouses: Scott Deem (m. 1983, divorced) Michael Ilesanmi (m. 2020; div. 2026)
- Children: 2

Angela Kaye Deem (née Standridge; born December 9, 1965) is an American television personality. She is best known for appearing in the TLC reality television franchise, 90 Day Fiancé.

== Early life ==
Deem was born on December 9, 1965, the only child of Marcene and Glenda (née Hull) Standridge. She was raised in Florida and attended William R. Boone High School in Orlando.

== Career ==
Deem began her television career making guest appearances on daytime talk shows such as The Trisha Goddard Show and Maury regarding family disputes.

In 2018, she starred in Season 2 of 90 Day Fiance: Before the 90 Days, documenting her long-distance relationship with Nigerian, Michael Ilesanmi, whom she met on Facebook. The couple’s relationship continued to be featured across multiple installments of the franchise, including 90 Day Fiancé, 90 Day Fiancé: Happily Ever After?, and 90 Day Fiancé: The Last Resort.

The couple initially planned to obtain a K-1 visa and marry in the United States. However a denial caused them to marry in Nigeria instead. Michael eventually immigrated to the United States on a spousal visa.

== Personal life ==
Angela has two daughters, Skyla and Scottie, from her first marriage, which ended in divorce. She has six grandchildren and resides in Hazlehurst, Georgia.

In 2019, her daughter Scottie was convicted on criminal charges related to child molestation and sentenced to prison. Following the conviction, Deem became the primary caregiver of three of her grandchildren.

Angela married Michael in 2020. They separated in 2024. Their divorce was finalized on 2026.

Angela is a vocal supporter of President Donald Trump, and expressed support for restrictions on Nigerian immigration following her separation from Michael.
