= John H. Livingston =

American aviator (1897–1974)

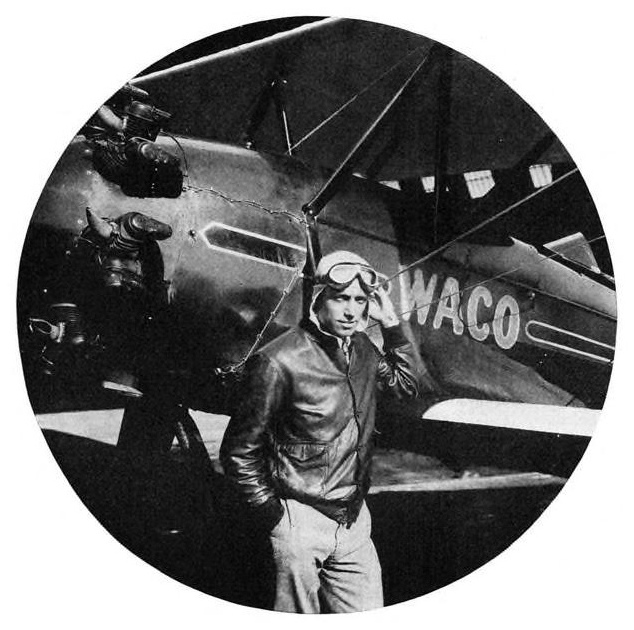
- Livingston in 1929
- Born: November 30, 1897; Cedar Falls, Iowa, US
- Died: June 30, 1974 (aged 76–77)
- Resting place: Greenwood Cemetery, Cedar Falls, Iowa
- Education: Lincoln High (1 year)
- Known for: Air racing
- Relatives: Aden "Bite" Livingston

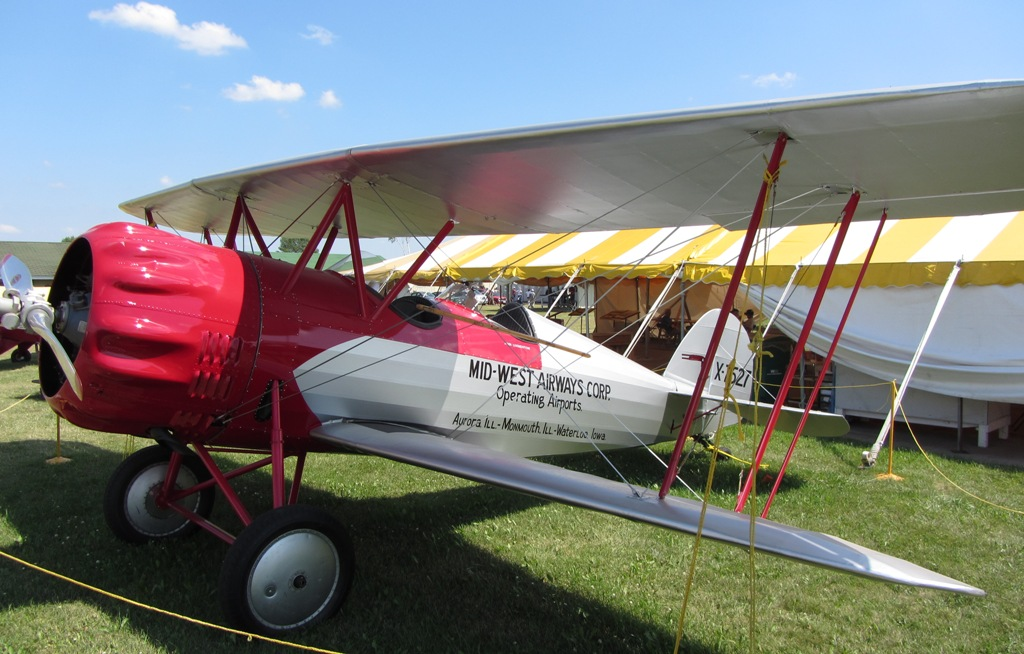
WACO 10 Taperwing ASO flown by Livingston in 1928 Air Derby

John Henry Livingston (1897–1974) was an American aviator and air race pilot of the 1920s and 1930s. He placed first in 80 national air races.

== Life ==
John Henry Livingston was born in 1897 in Cedar Falls, Iowa. His first profession was as an automobile and motorcycle mechanic. He first soloed an aircraft in 1920 and started work with The Iowa Airplane Company, later purchasing and managing it as Midwest Airways Corporation. Iowa's first airline with service starting in 1928.

In 1928 Livingston won first place in the Transcontinental Air Derby, flying a Waco 10T from New York to Los Angeles.

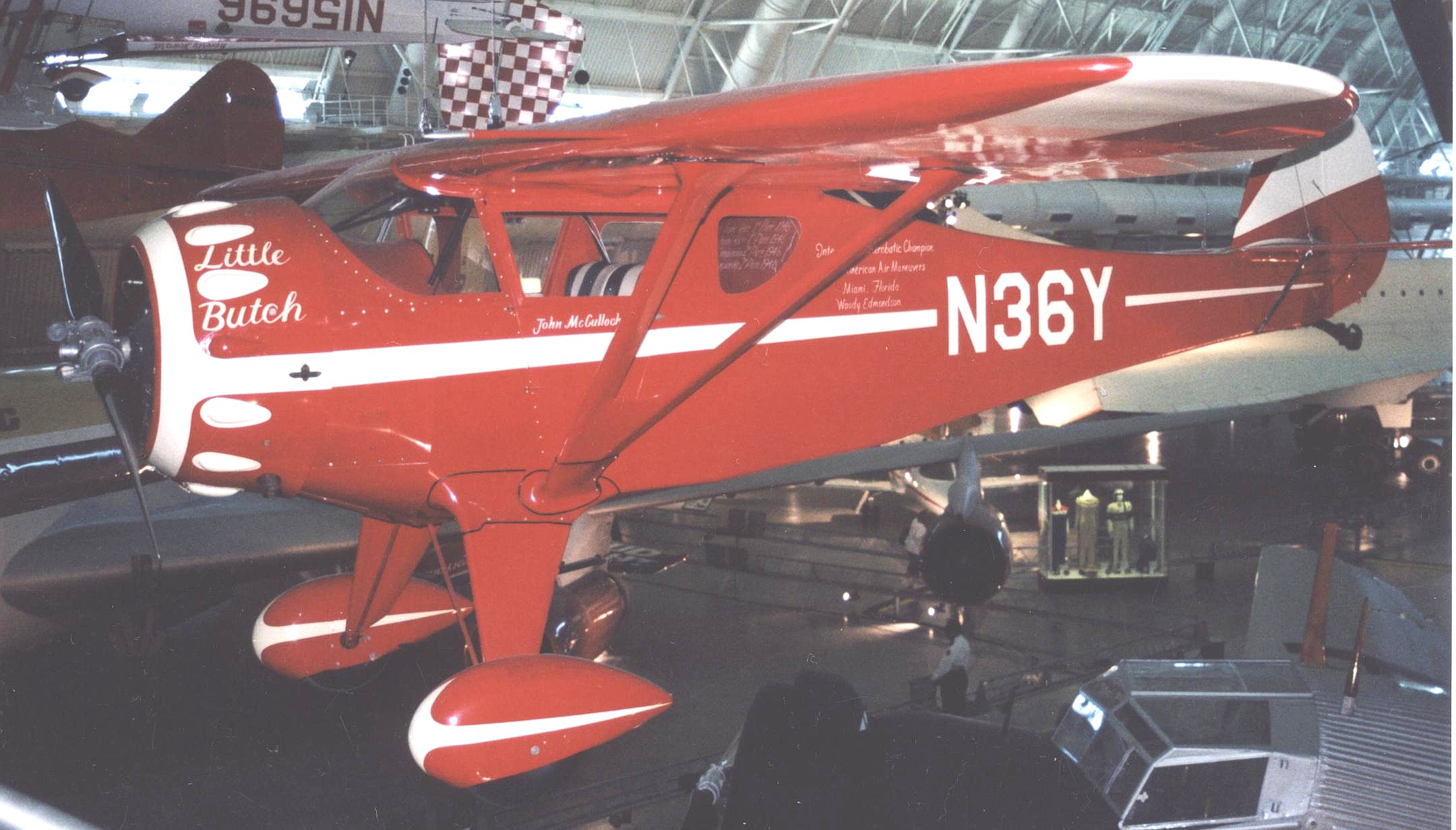
A Monocoupe 110

In 1930, Livingston purchased a Monocoupe 110 (NC-501W) to use in air racing. He modified the landing gear, engine cowling, engine output, streamlined struts. In 1932 the aircraft went back to the factory to have the wings clipped from 32 feet to 22 feet in length becoming a Monocoupe 110 Special. Livingston would fly the aircraft through rain storms with whitewash paint to find areas of drag. His modifications increased the speed of the monocoupe from 160 to 200 mph. Out of 65 races entered, he placed first 41 times in this aircraft. He sold his aircraft in 1933, and it was entered in the MacRobertson Race flying from England to India where it dropped out. The rebuilt airplane returned to America, killing its next owner Ruth Barron in a 1936 Omaha, Nebraska crash. Livingston's first Monocoupe racer was restored over ten years between 1996 and 2006 and is still flying.

By 1933, Livingston had won more air races than any other pilot. After losing to a pilot flying a Cessna CR-2 racer, he commissioned an even faster Cessna CR-3 racer. His aircraft only lasted 61 days before he had to bail out over Ohio. In that time he won every race he entered with the aircraft. After the season, he went to work for WACO as a test pilot, and was also sponsored in the Baby Ruth Aerobatic Team featuring aircraft tied together with ropes.

In 1939, Livingston returned to air racing in a Monocoupe.

Livingston managed Chapman Airport in Iowa with his brother throughout the 1930s into World War II. He managed a cadet training program with over 1500 students completing basic training.

He retired at Pompano Beach, Florida.

Livingston suffered a heart attack and died shortly after test flying a Pitts Special at the age of 76. he was inducted into the Iowa aviation Hall of Fame in 1995.

His Waco taperwing has been donated to the EAA AirVenture Museum in Oshkosh, Wisconsin where it has been restored.

== Races ==
- 1928 Transcontinental Speed Race - First Place in a Waco Taperwing
- 1929 Ford Tour - First Place
- 1931 National Air Races Cleveland, Ohio - First Place
- 1939 Miami Air Races - First Place in a Monocoupe

== In popular culture ==
John Livingston is considered to be the inspiration and namesake for the 1970 novel and 1973 film Jonathan Livingston Seagull by author and pilot Richard Bach.

== Legacy ==
Livingston-Betsworth Field, as well as the fixed-base operator at the Waterloo, Iowa, municipal airport, are named in his honor.
