= Cessna GC-1 =

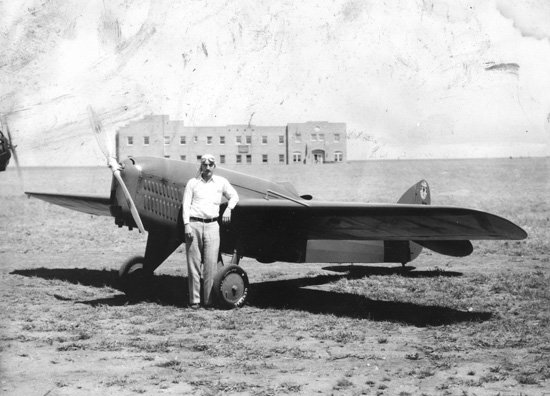

General information
- Type: Air racer
- National origin: United States of America
- Manufacturer: Clyde V. Cessna Aircraft Company
- Number built: 1

History
- Retired: 1932

The Cessna GC-1 was an air racer built to compete in the Cirrus All American Air Derby in 1930.

== Design and development ==
Cessna built the GC-1 for Blackwell Aviation to compete for a $25,000 prize in the 1930 Cirrus All American Air Derby. Blackwell registered the Cessna GC-1 NR-144V.

The aircraft was a mid-wing open cockpit taildragger. The landing gear was attached by struts to both the fuselage, and the wing spar.

A more powerful version with a shortened fuselage was built as the GC-2, powered by a 110 hp (82 kW) Warner Scarab 7-cylinder radial engine.

== Operational history ==
Stanley Stanton placed seventh in the 1930 Cirrus All American Air Derby with the GC-1. The press proclaimed the racer the "Winged Torpedo". E.B Smith flew the aircraft in the 1930 National Air Races placing fourth with an average speed of 137.4 mph.

The GC-1 was destroyed in a landing accident, in collision with a mail plane at the Kansas City Municipal Airport.

== Variants ==
GC-1
The sole GC-1, given the name Miss Blackwell, was completed in 1929, powered by a 95 hp (71 kW) Cirrus Ensign. the GC-1 had two liveries, the first was Cessna Red with black registration numbers N144V the second was Cessna red with yellow registration numbers and the script "Miss Blackwell" added to the cowling.

GC-2
A second aircraft almost identical to the GC-1, but powered by a 110 hp (82 kW) Warner Scarab and fuselage length of 20 ft 5 in (6.22 m).

== Specifications (Cessna GC-1) ==
Data from Sport Aviation

General characteristics

- Crew: 1

Performance

== See also ==
Related development

- Cessna CR-1
- Cessna CR-2
- Cessna CR-3
