= CFC domain =

Protein domain

CFC
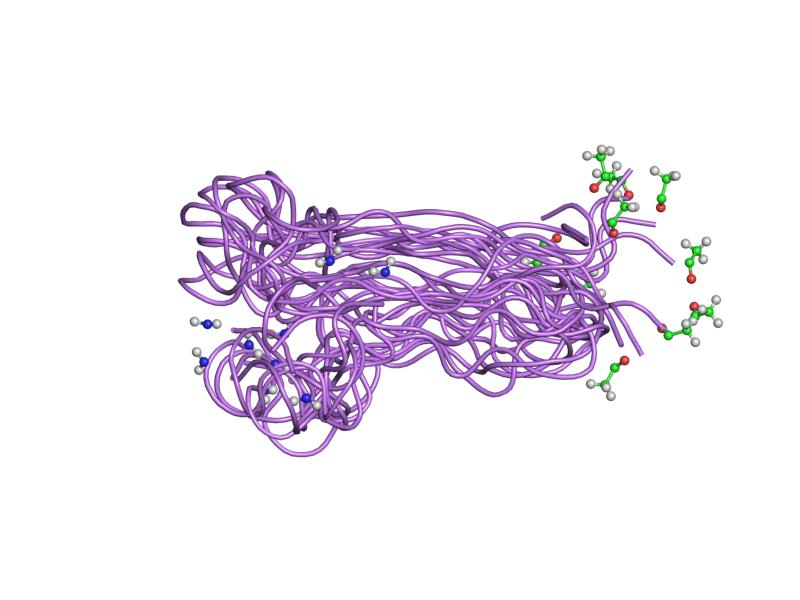
- nmr analysis of mouse cripto cfc domain

Identifiers
- Symbol: CFC
- Pfam: PF09443
- InterPro: IPR019011
Available protein structures:
- Pfam: structures / ECOD
- PDB: RCSB PDB; PDBe; PDBj
- PDBsum: structure summary

In molecular biology, the CFC domain (Cripto_Frl-1_Cryptic domain) is a protein domain found at the C-terminus of a number of proteins including Cripto (or teratocarcinoma-derived growth factor). It is structurally similar to the C-terminal extracellular portions of Jagged 1 and Jagged 2. CFC is approx 40-residues long, compacted by three internal disulphide bridges, and binds Alk4 via a hydrophobic patch. CFC is structurally homologous to the VWFC-like domain.

The CFC domain appears to play a crucial role in the tumourigenic activity of Cripto proteins, as it is through the CFC domain that Cripto interferes with the onco-suppressive activity of Activins, either by blocking the Activin receptor ALK4 or by antagonising proteins of the TGF-beta family.
