= Cessna EC-1 =

1930s American aircraft

General information
- National origin: USA
- Manufacturer: Cessna Aircraft Company
- Designer: Eldon Cessna
- Number built: 2
- Registration: N133V

History
- Manufactured: 1930
- Variants: Cessna EC-2

The Cessna Model EC-1 was a 1930s American single-seat, free-floating high tourer glider built by the Cessna Aircraft Company in the early 1930s as a response to the Great Depression. Designed by Eldon Cessna, it was a single-seat, free-floating high glider based on the CG-2 training glider, with a 26 hp Cleone engine. Although it was not put into serial production, the EC-1 played a role in Cessna's eventual success.

== Design and development ==
Following the onset of the Great Depression following the Wall Street crash of 1929 in the United States, Cessna Aircraft encountered significant challenges in selling their aircraft. To address this issue, the company pursued the development of a small, cost-effective airplane that would be economical to operate. The project was led by Eldon Cessna, the son of Clyde Cessna, who was the company's leader at the time. The design of the aircraft was based on the CG-2 training glider.

In 1930, the company completed the first prototype of this aircraft, designated as the EC-1 and registered as N133V. The EC-1 was a s equipped with a 25 hp Cleone engine. A second aircraft of this type, registered as N199V, was also produced shortly after. The EC-2, a two-seat version of the aircraft, was subsequently developed and equipped with a 30 hp (22 kW) Aeronca E-107A engine. Only two prototypes, registered as N403W and N405W and painted red, were constructed under this designation. These prototypes were commonly referred to as "Baby Cessnas". Cessna did not proceed with serial production of the EC-1 or EC-2, as operations were suspended until 1934. The sole surviving EC-1 is currently on display at the Reynolds-Alberta Museum.

== Specifications ==
General characteristics

- Crew: 2
- Fuel capacity: 8 Gal.

Performance

== See also ==
Related development

- Cessna EC-2
