= Cripto =

Protein found in humans

CFC1B
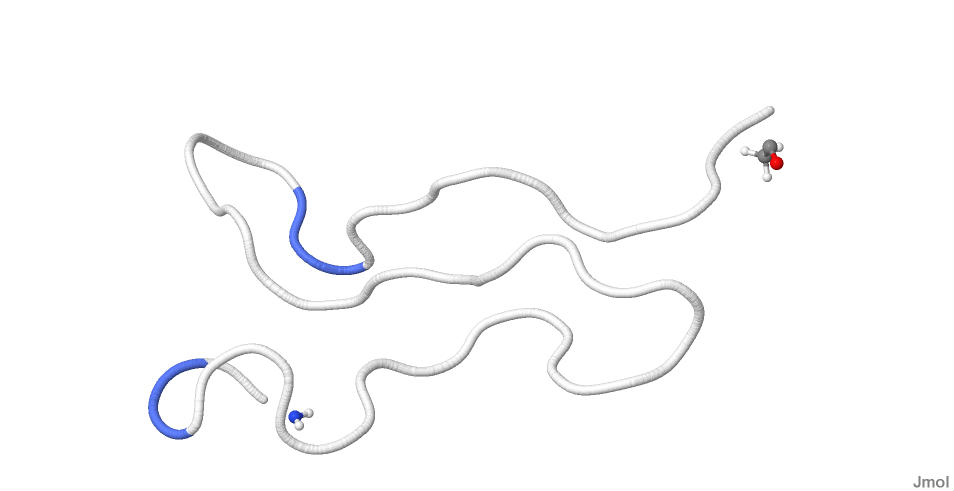

Identifiers
- Aliases: CFC1B, entrez:653275, cripto, FRL-1, cryptic family 1B
- External IDs: MGI: 109448; GeneCards: CFC1B

Gene location (Human)
Chr.	Chromosome 2 (human)
Band	2q21.1	Start	130,521,197 bp
Band	2q21.1	End	130,528,604 bp

Gene location (Mouse)
Chr.	Chromosome 1 (mouse)
Band	1|1 B	Start	34,574,729 bp
Band	1|1 B	End	34,583,394 bp
RNA expression pattern
Bgee	Human / Mouse (ortholog); Top expressed in: gonad; islet of Langerhans; prefrontal cortex; rectum; right adrenal cortex; olfactory zone of nasal mucosa; muscle tissue; duodenum; superior frontal gyrus; urinary bladder / Top expressed in: embryo; mesoderm; gastrula; morula; blastocyst; embryo; embryonic organizer; lateral plate mesoderm; epiblast; condyle; More reference expression data
BioGPS	n/a
Gene ontology
Molecular function	signaling receptor binding; nodal binding; activin receptor binding
Cellular component	extracellular region; cell surface
Biological process	multicellular organism development; gastrulation; determination of left/right symmetry; development of the heart; anterior/posterior pattern specification; BMP signaling pathway; nodal signaling pathway; anatomical structure development
Sources:Amigo / QuickGO
Orthologs
Databases	NCBI: entry; OMA: entry
Species	Human	Mouse
Entrez	653275	12627
Ensembl	ENSG00000152093	ENSMUSG00000026124
UniProt	P0CG36	P97766
RefSeq (mRNA)	NM_001079530	NM_007685
RefSeq (protein)	NP_001072998	NP_031711
Location (UCSC)	Chr 2: 130.52 – 130.53 Mb	Chr 1: 34.57 – 34.58 Mb
PubMed search
- Wikidata
View/Edit Human	View/Edit Mouse

Cripto is an EGF-CFC or epidermal growth factor-CFC, which is encoded by the Cryptic family 1 gene. Cryptic family protein 1B is a protein that in humans is encoded by the CFC1B gene. Cryptic family protein 1B acts as a receptor for the TGF beta signaling pathway. It has been associated with the translation of an extracellular protein for this pathway. The extracellular protein which Cripto encodes plays a crucial role in the development of left and right division of symmetry.

Crypto is a glycosylphosphatidylinositol-anchored co-receptor that binds nodal and the activin type I ActRIB (ALK)-4 receptor (ALK4).

== Structure ==
Cripto is composed of two adjacent cysteine-rich motifs: the EGF-like and the CFC of an N-terminal signal peptide and of a C-terminal hydrophobic region attached by a GPI anchor, which makes it a potentially essential element in the signaling pathway directing vertebrate embryo development. NMR data confirm that the CFC domain has a C1-C4, C2-C6, C3-C5 disulfide pattern and show that structures are rather flexible and globally extended, with three non-canonical anti-parallel strands.

== Function ==
In the Nodal signaling pathway of embryonic development, Cripto has been shown to have dual function as a co-receptor as well as ligand. Particularly in cell cultures, it has been shown to act as a signaling molecule with the capabilities of a growth factor, and in co-culture assays, it has displayed the property of a co-ligand to Nodal. Glycosylation is responsible for mediating this interface with Nodal. EGF-CFC proteins' composition as a receptor complex is further solidified by the GPI linkage, making the cell membrane connection able to regulate growth factor signaling of Nodal.

== Expression during embryonic development ==
High concentrations of Cripto are found in both the trophoblast and inner cell mass, along the primitive streak as the second epithelial-mesenchymal transformation event occurs to form the mesoderm, and in the myocardium of the developing heart. Though no specific defect has been formally associated with mutations in Cripto, in vitro studies that disrupt gene function at various times during development have provided glimpses of possible malformations. For example, inactivation of Cripto during gastrulation disrupted the migration of newly formed mesenchymal mesoderm cells, resulting in the accumulation of cells around the primitive streak and eventual embryonic death. Other results of Cripto disruption include the lack of posterior structures. and a block on the differentiation of cardiac myocyte. both of which lead to embryonic death.

Cripto's functions have been hypothesized from these null mutation studies. It is now known that Cripto is similar to other morphogens originating from the primitive streak in that it is asymmetrically expressed, specifically in a proximal-distal gradient, explaining the failure of posterior structures to form in the absence of Cripto.

== The role in cancer ==
The high expression of Cripto-1 was detected in many types of cancer such as pancreatic, breast and colon cancer. The high expression levels were linked to poor survival rate in cancer patients. Its role was suggested to be through promotion of epithelial-to-mesenchymal transition (EMT). The Wnt signaling pathway/β-catenin and TGF-B/Smad pathway was shown to control epithelial-to-mesenchymal transition in cancer. Recently, Cripto-1 was proposed as cancer stem cell marker.

== Clinical significance ==
CFC1B has oncogene potential due to the tumor cell proliferation through initiation by autocrine or paracrine signaling. Furthermore, the cryptic protein is highly over-expressed in many tumors such as colorectal, gastric, breast, and pancreatic cancers in homosapiens. Cripto is one of the key regulators of embryonic stem cells differentiation into cardiomyocyte vs. neuronal fate. Expression levels of cripto are associated with resistance to EGFR inhibitors.

== See also ==
- Teratocarcinoma-derived growth factor 1
