= Climax CR1 =

British sports car

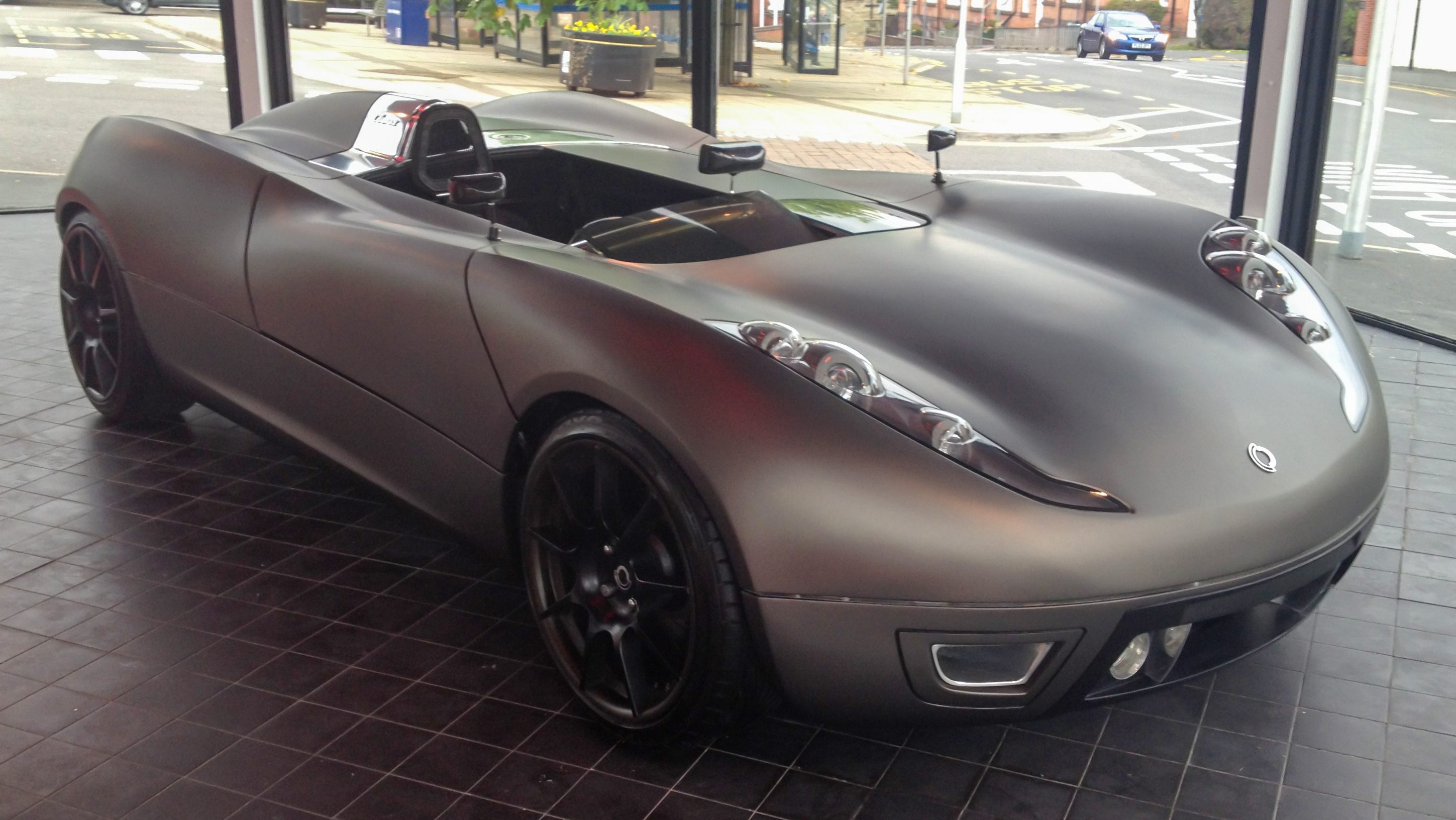

Overview
- Manufacturer: Climax Cars Ltd
- Production: 2015

Body and chassis
- Class: Sports car
- Body style: Two door, Roadster
- Layout: Mid-engine, rear-wheel drive

Powertrain
- Engine: Subaru boxer-four engine
- Transmission: 6-speed manual

The Climax CR1 is a British mid-engine, rear-wheel drive two-seater sports car by Climax Cars Ltd. It is powered by an ethanol flat four engine.

== Concept Climax ==
The Climax CR1 was introduced as the Concept Climax which debuted at the 2007 Goodwood Festival of Speed. It was designed by three Coventry University graduates inspired by the 1950s Cooper Climax F1 design.

The ethanol-powered flat four engine with 5-speed manual transmission produces 270 hp (201 kW) at 6500 rpm and can accelerate from 0-60 mph (97 km/h) in 3.4 seconds with a claimed top speed of 160 mph (257 km/h).

== Gallery ==
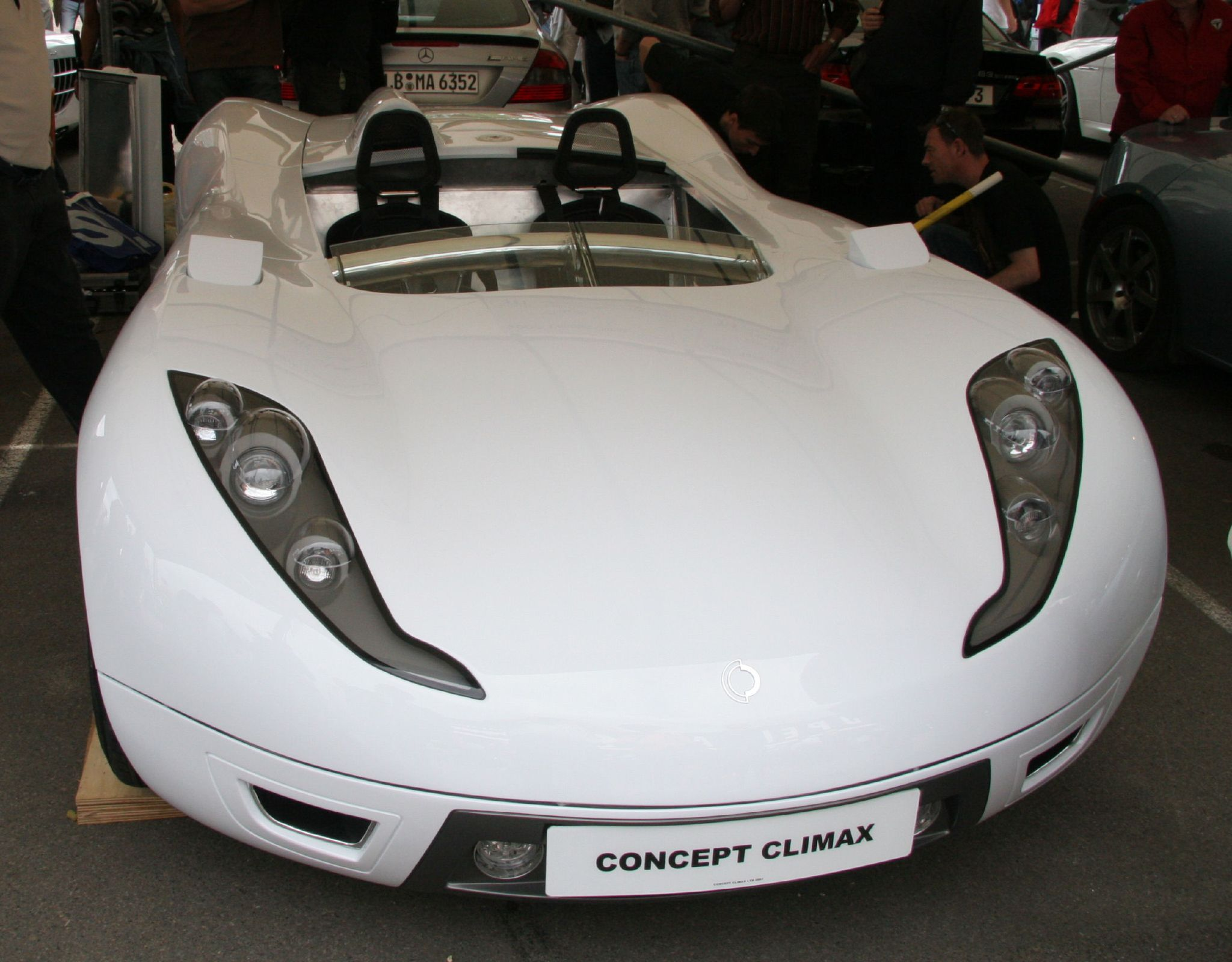
2007 Concept Climax

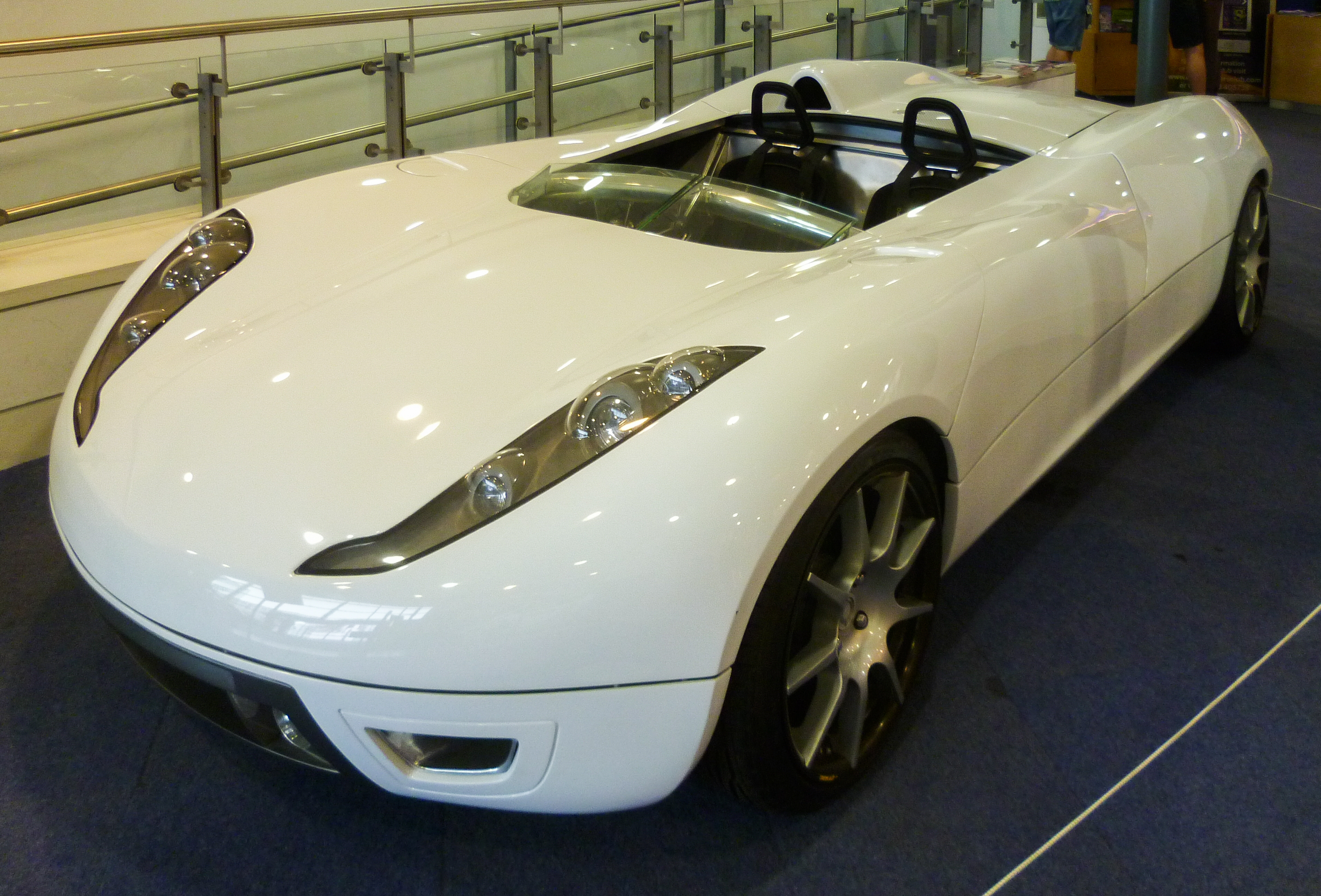
Sports Racer on display in the Coventry Transport Museum in July 2011

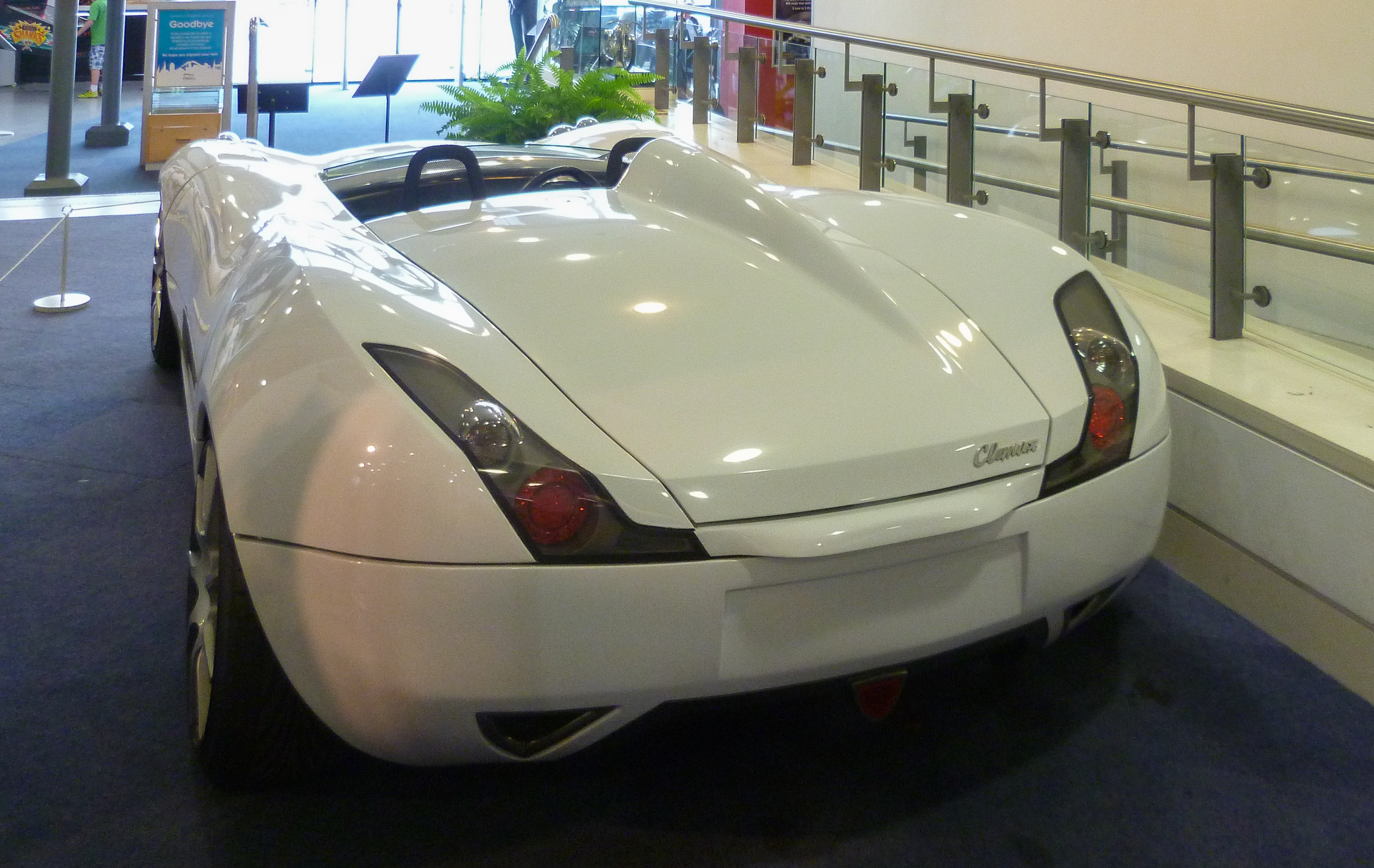
Sports Racer rear

== Production Model ==
The production model debuted at the 2015 Coventry Motofest. The bodywork is made of a combination of aluminium and carbon fibre. It includes flip up aeroscreen, detachable steering wheel and removable tonneau cover.

Options includes air conditioning and sound system.

The standard model runs on a Subaru Boxer flat 4-cylinder engine and produces 300 hp (224 kW) at 6000 rpm and 407 N⋅m (300 lbf⋅ft) of torque at 4000 rpm and includes a 6-speed manual with automatic shifting and clutch as well as limited slip differential.

The CR1 has an estimated top speed of 274 km/h (170 mph) and accelerates from 0-60 mph (97 km/h) in 4 seconds.

Fuel efficiency is rated at 20.5 mpg (urban), 34.4 mpg (extra urban) and 27.4 mpg (combined), and the car emits 243 g/km CO_{2}.

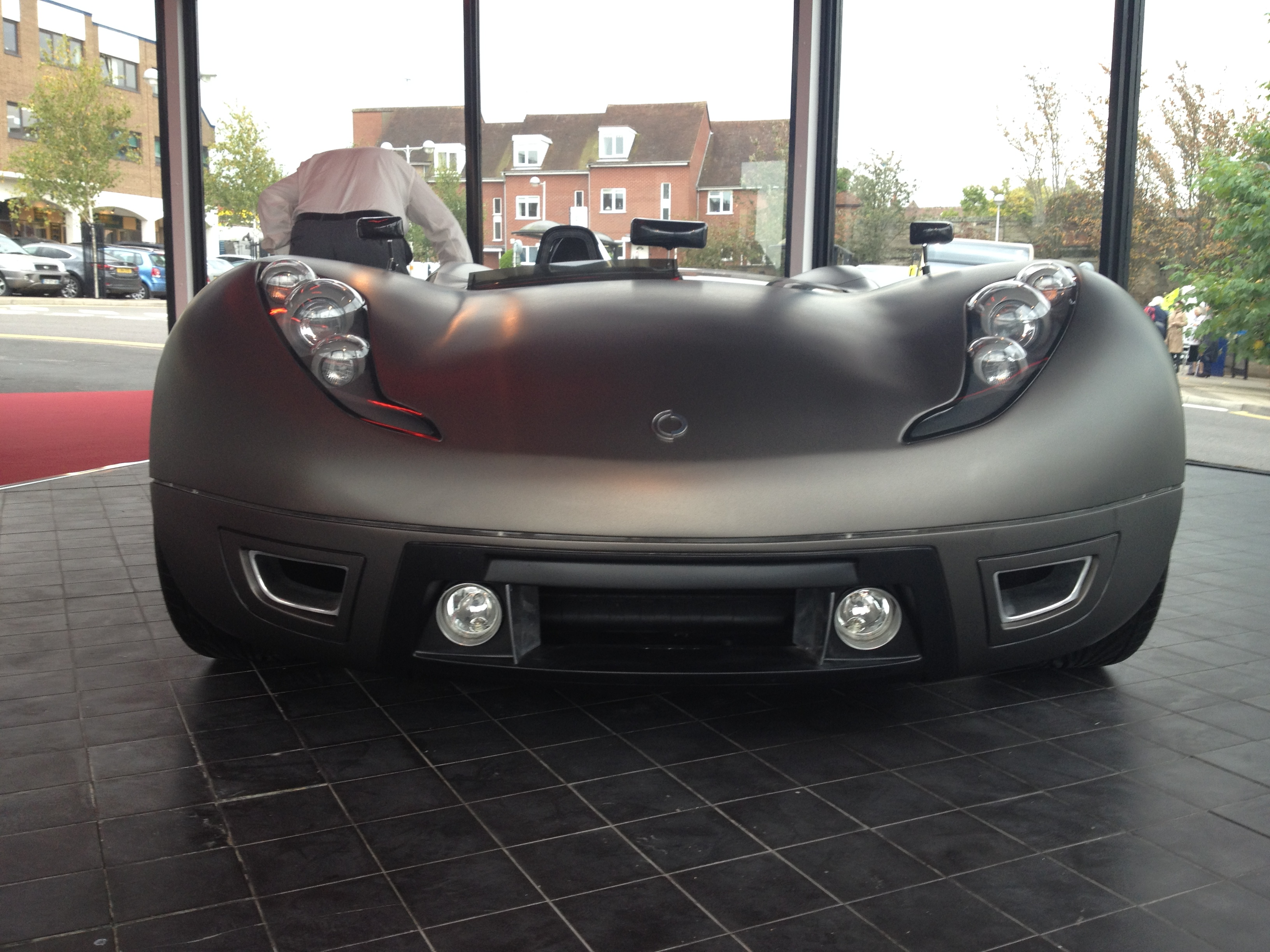
In the showroom

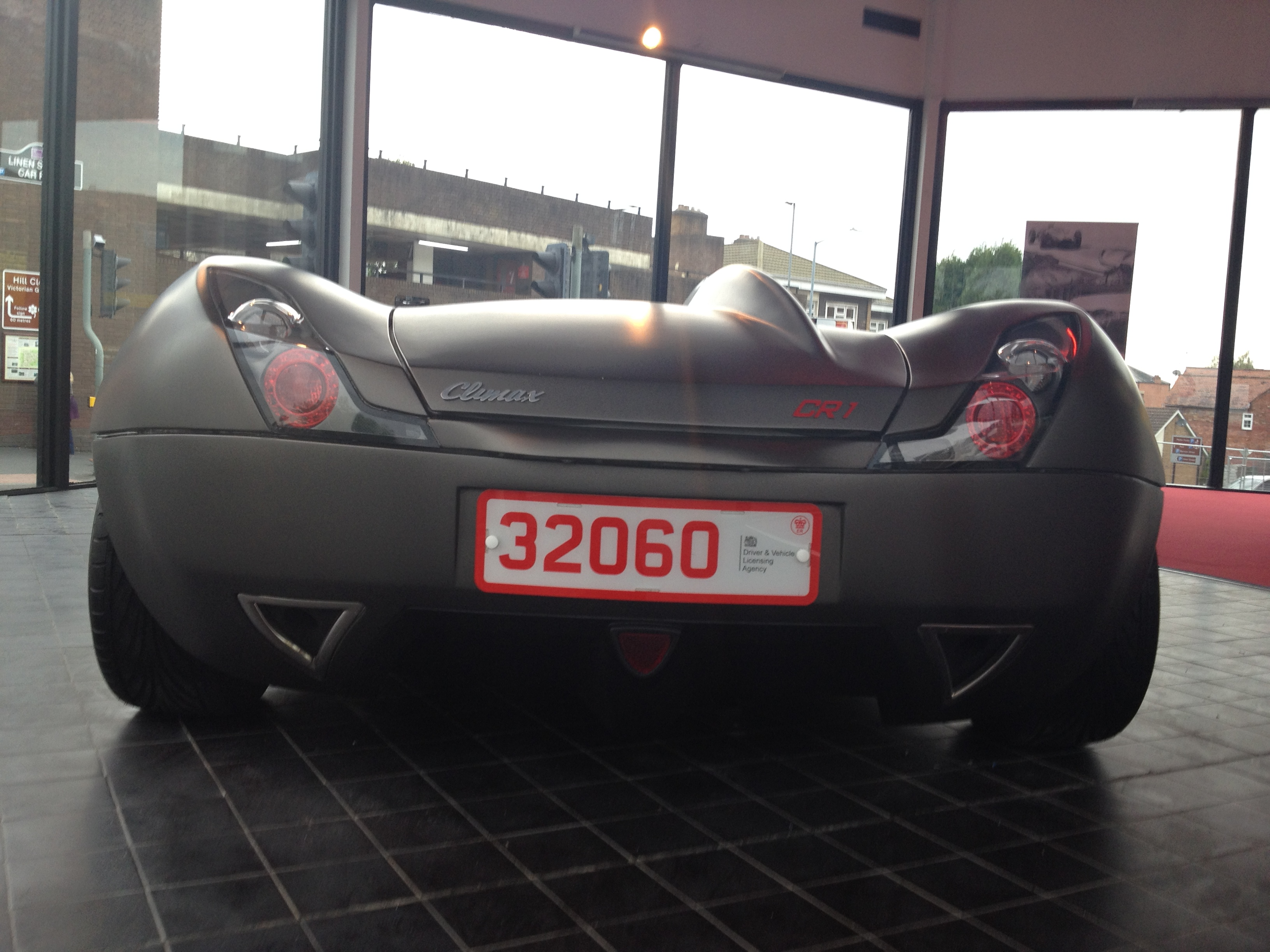
In the showroom

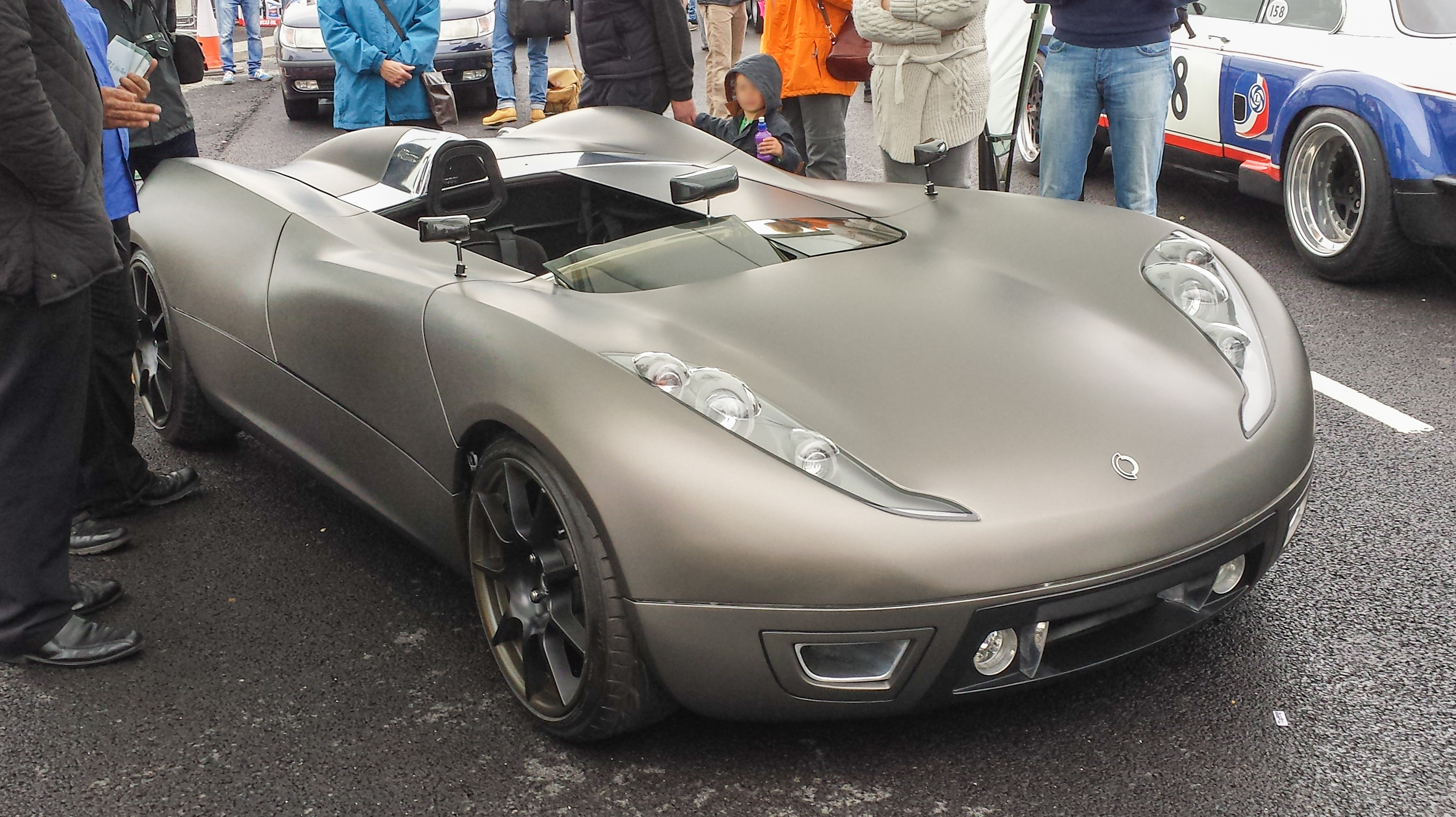
At the Coventry MotoFest 2015

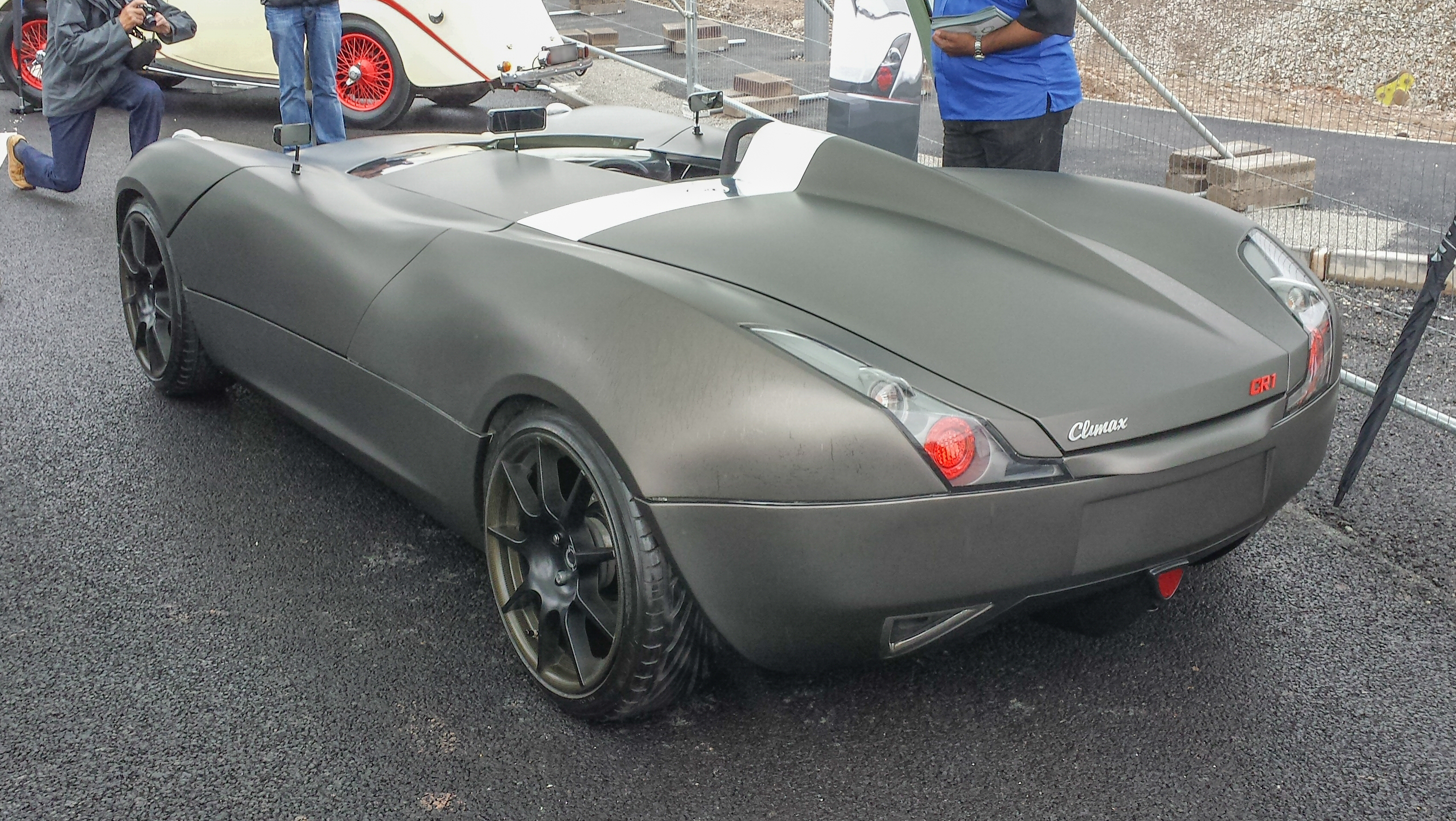
At the Coventry MotoFest 2015
