= Cessna 195 =

American light single radial engine aircraft

Cessna 190 & 195
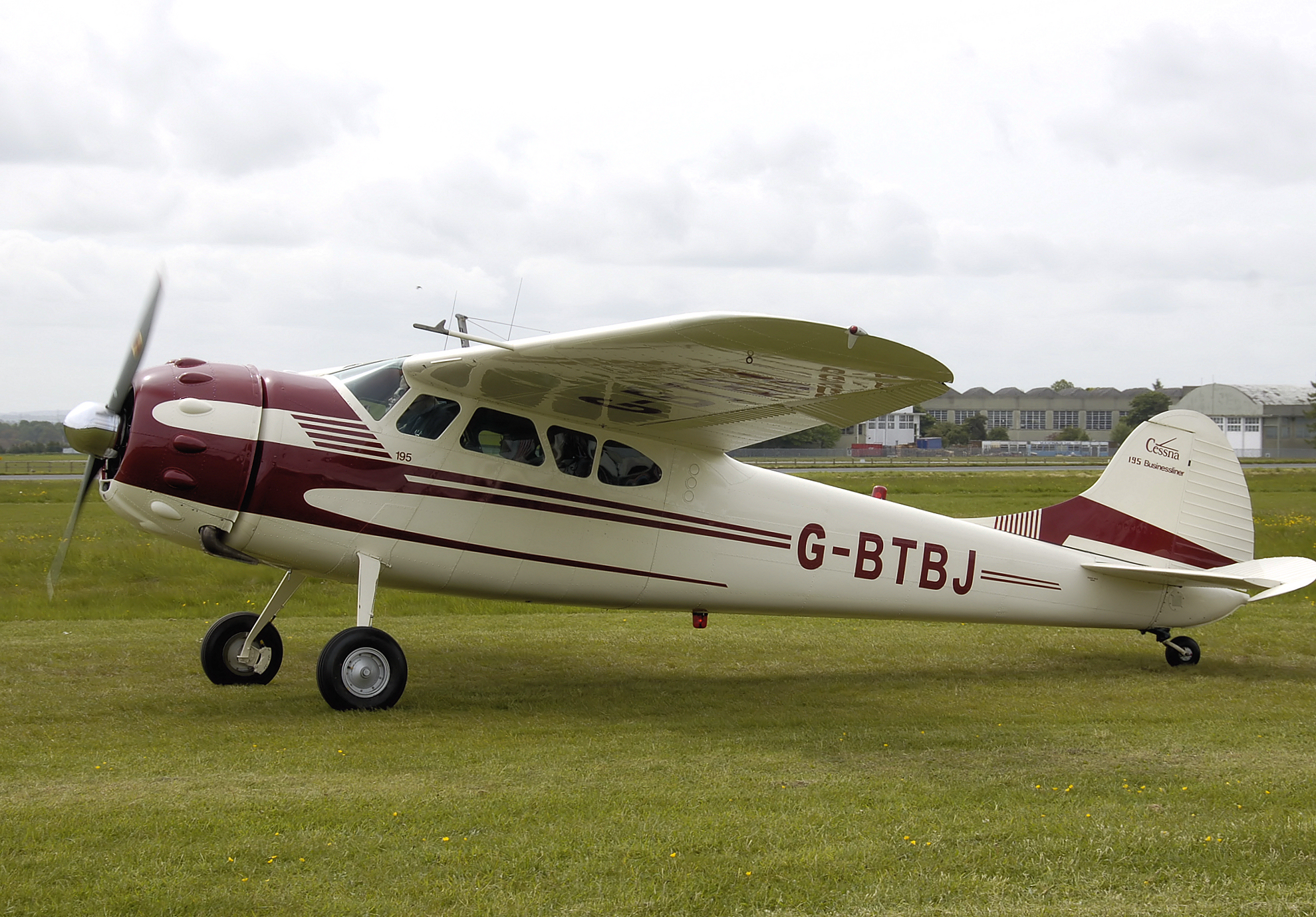
- Cessna 195

General information
- Type: Light personal and business aircraft
- National origin: United States
- Manufacturer: Cessna Aircraft Company
- Primary users: United States Army United States Air Force
- Number built: 1,180

History
- Manufactured: 1947–1954
- Introduction date: 1947
- First flight: 1945
- Developed from: Cessna 165
- Developed into: Cessna X210

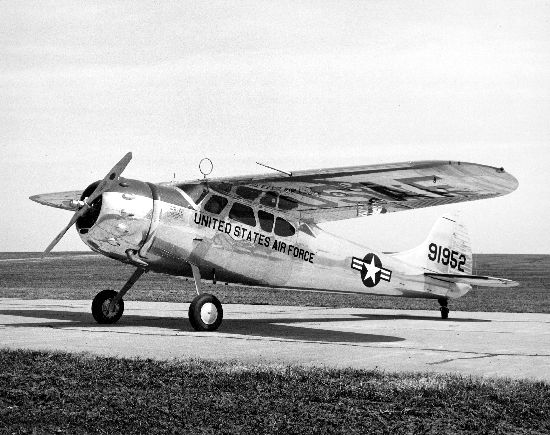
Cessna LC-126A

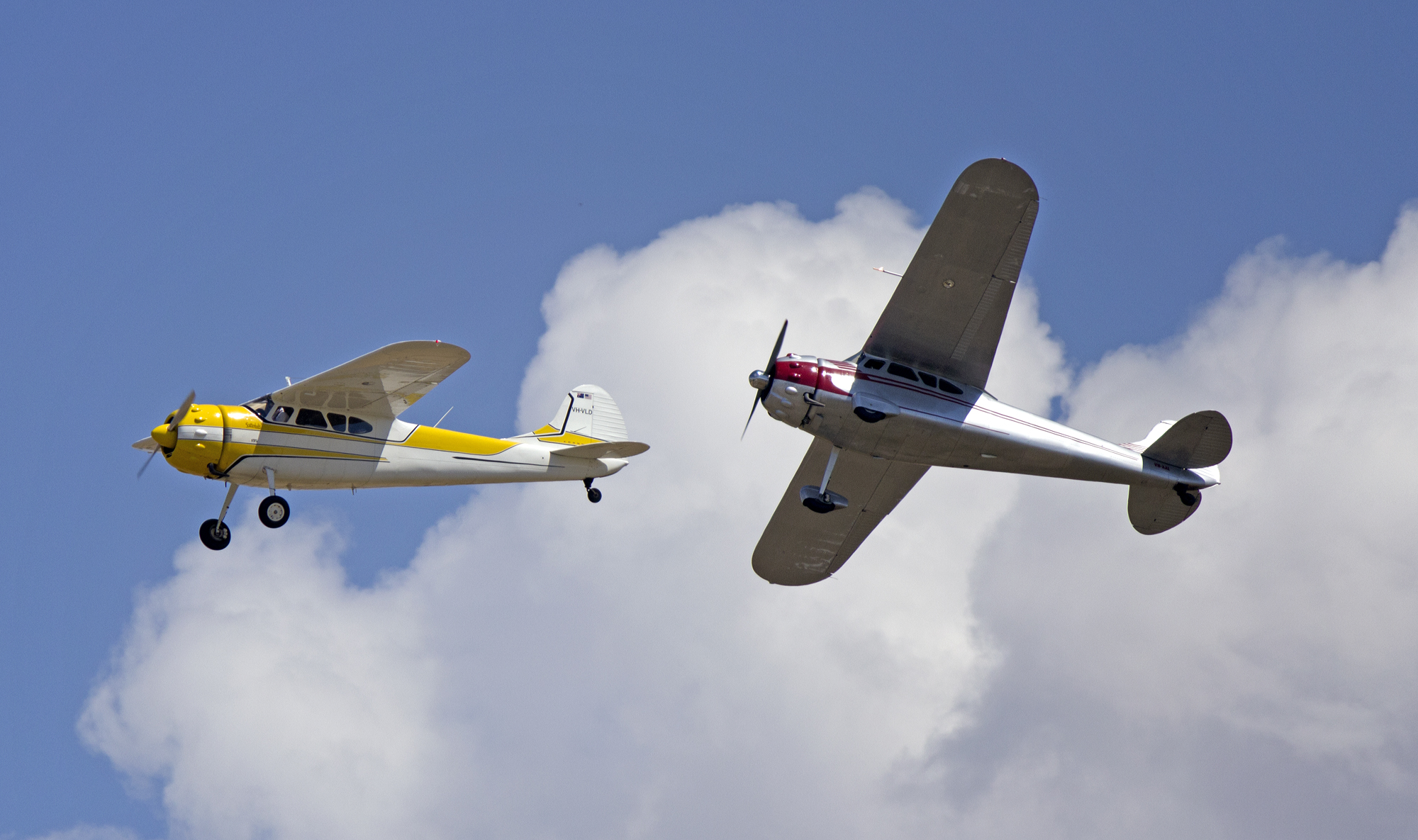
1953 Cessna 195B and 1948 Cessna 190

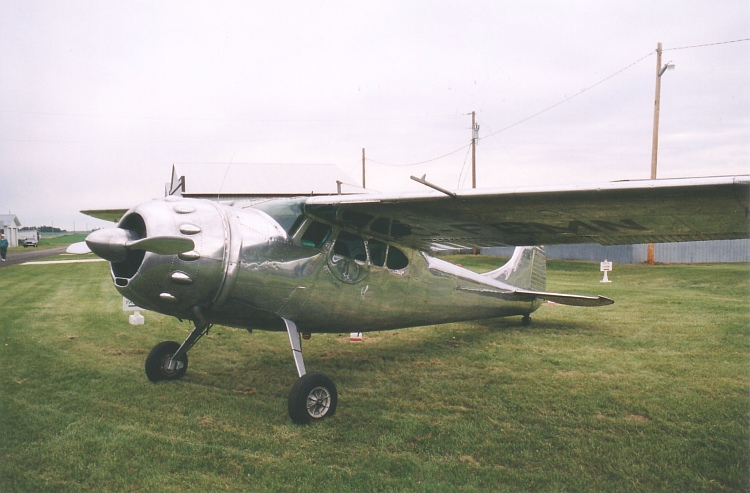
1949 model Cessna 195 in polished aluminum finish

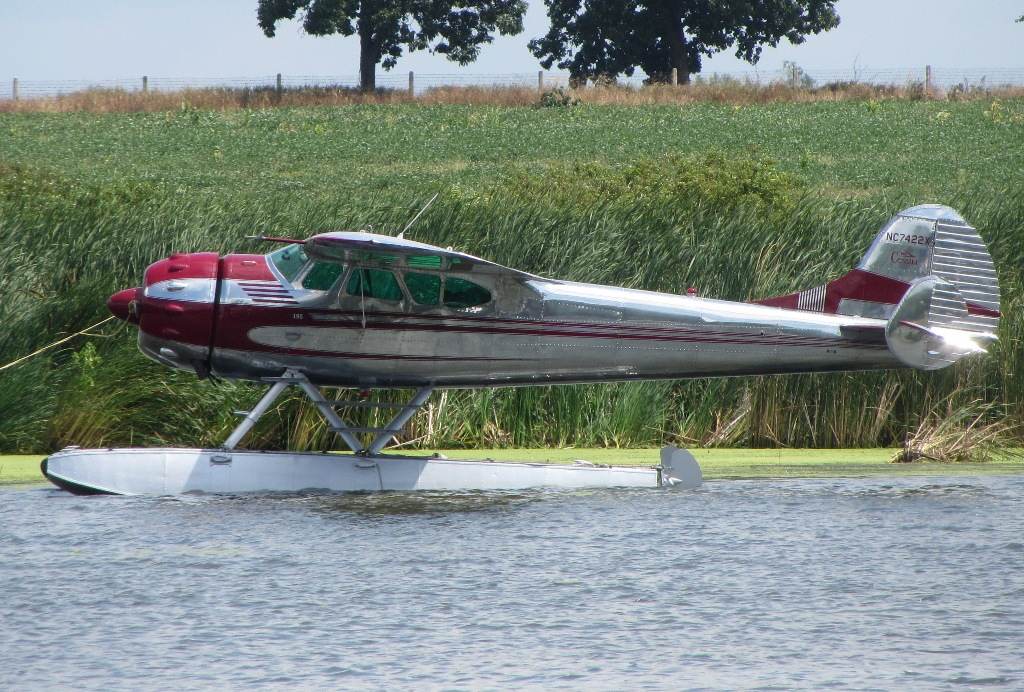
Float-equipped Cessna 195

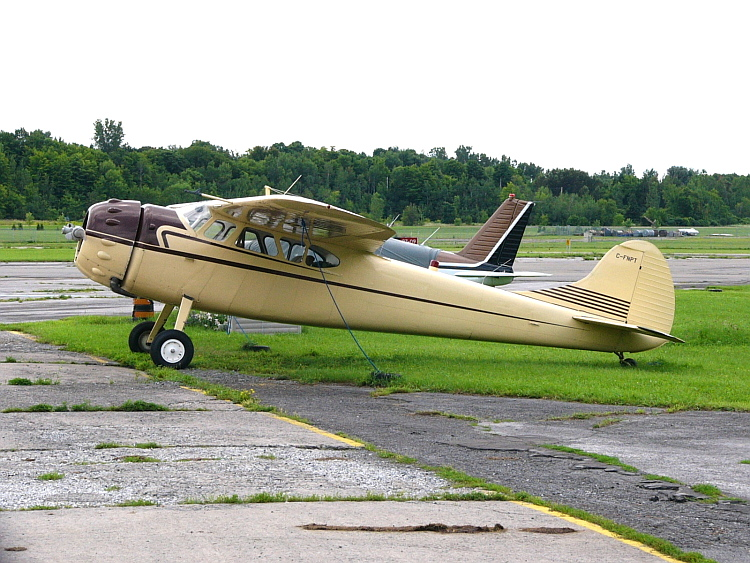
1947 model Cessna 190

The Cessna 190 and 195 Businessliner are a family of light single radial engine powered, conventional landing gear equipped, general aviation aircraft which were manufactured by Cessna between 1947 and 1954.

The 195 model was also used by the United States Air Force, United States Army, and Army National Guard as a light transport and utility aircraft under the designations LC-126/U-20.

== Development ==
The Cessna 190 and 195 were Cessna's only postwar radial-engined aircraft. The first prototype flew in 1945, after the end of World War II and both the 190 and 195 entered production in 1947.

The 195 was the first Cessna airplane to be completely constructed of aluminum and features a cantilever wing, similar to the pre-war Cessna 165 from which it is derived. The wing differs from later Cessna light aircraft in that it has a straight taper from root chord to tip chord and no dihedral. The airfoil employed is a NACA 2412, the same as used on the later Cessna 150, 172 and 182.

The 190/195 fuselage is large in comparison to other Cessna models because the 42" diameter radial engine had to be accommodated in the nose. There are two rows of seats: two individual seats in the first row, with a comfortable space between them and up to three passengers can be accommodated on a bench seat in the second row.

The 190/195 has flat sprung-steel landing gear legs derived from Cessna's purchase of the rights to Steve Wittman's Big X. Many have been equipped with swiveling crosswind landing gear which allows landing with up to 15 degrees of crab. While the crosswind gear simplifies the actual landing, it makes the aircraft difficult to handle on the ground. The 195 is equipped with a retractable step that extends when the cabin door is opened, although some have been modified to make the step a fixed unit.

The aircraft was expensive to purchase and operate for private use and Cessna therefore marketed them mainly as a business aircraft under the name "Businessliner".

The engines fitted to the 190 and 195 became well known for their oil consumption. The aircraft has a 5-US-gallon (19 L; 4.2 imp gal) oil tank, with 3 US gallons (11 L; 2.5 imp gal) the minimum for flight. Typical oil consumption with steel cylinder barrels is 2 US quarts (1.9 L; 1.7 imp qt) per hour.

A factory-produced floatplane version was equipped with a triple tail for improved yaw stability.

The Cessna 195 produces a cruise true airspeed of 148 knots (170 mph; 274 km/h) on a fuel consumption of 16 US gallons (13 imp gal; 61 L) per hour. It can accommodate five people.

Including the LC-126s, a total of 1180 190s and 195s were built.

The 190 was originally introduced at a price of USD12,750 in 1947 (equivalent to $183,839 in 2025). When production ended in 1954 the price had risen to USD24,700 (equivalent to $296,125 in 2025) for the 195B. This compared to USD3,495 for the Cessna 140 two seater of the same period.

=== LC-126/U-20 ===
The LC-126 was the military version of the 300 hp (220 kW) Cessna 195 and could be fitted with skis or floats. 83 LC-126s were delivered, including:

- USAF - Cessna LC-126 - 15
- Army National Guard - Cessna LC-126B - 5
- US Army - Cessna LC-126C - 63

Once made surplus the majority of LC-126s were sold as civil aircraft, once modified by a Cessna civil kit.

== Operational history ==
The Cessna 190 and 195 are considered "one of the finest classics ever built" by pilots and collectors and are much sought after on the used aircraft market.

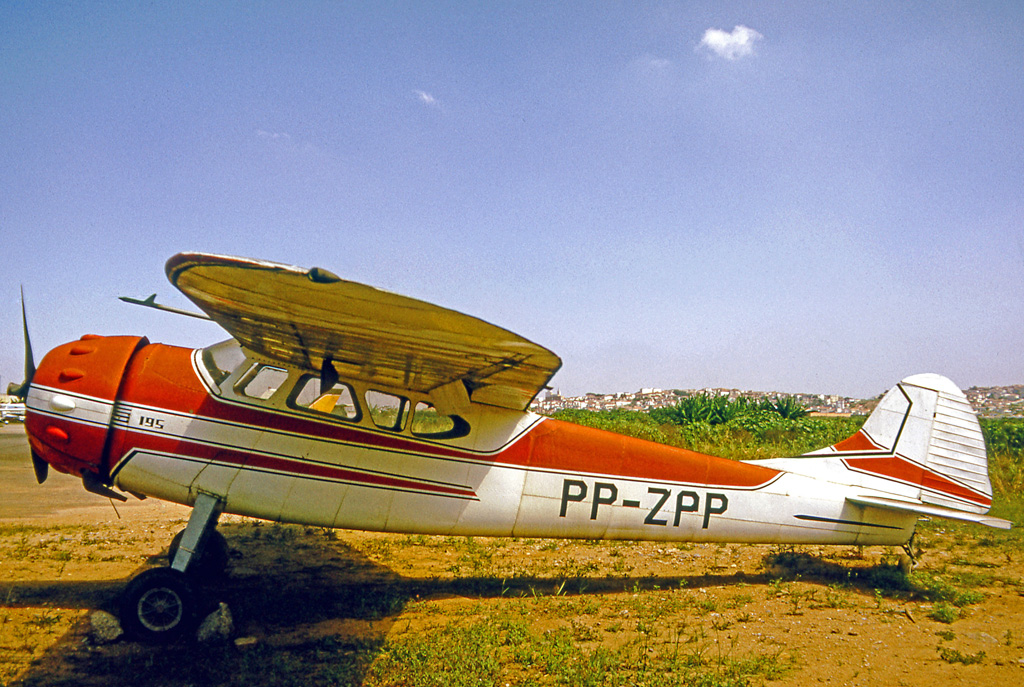
Brazilian-registered Cessna 195 at Marte airfield, São Paulo in 1975

On July 24, 2017 the number of 190s and 195s still registered in the USA were:

- 86 Cessna 190
- 225 Cessna 195
- 125 Cessna 195A
- 126 Cessna 195B

In February 2014 there were three Cessna 190s, eleven Cessna 195s, two Cessna 195As and two Cessna 195Bs registered in Canada. Other Cessna 190 and 195 aircraft have been purchased by private pilot owners resident in Brazil and the United Kingdom.

== Variants ==
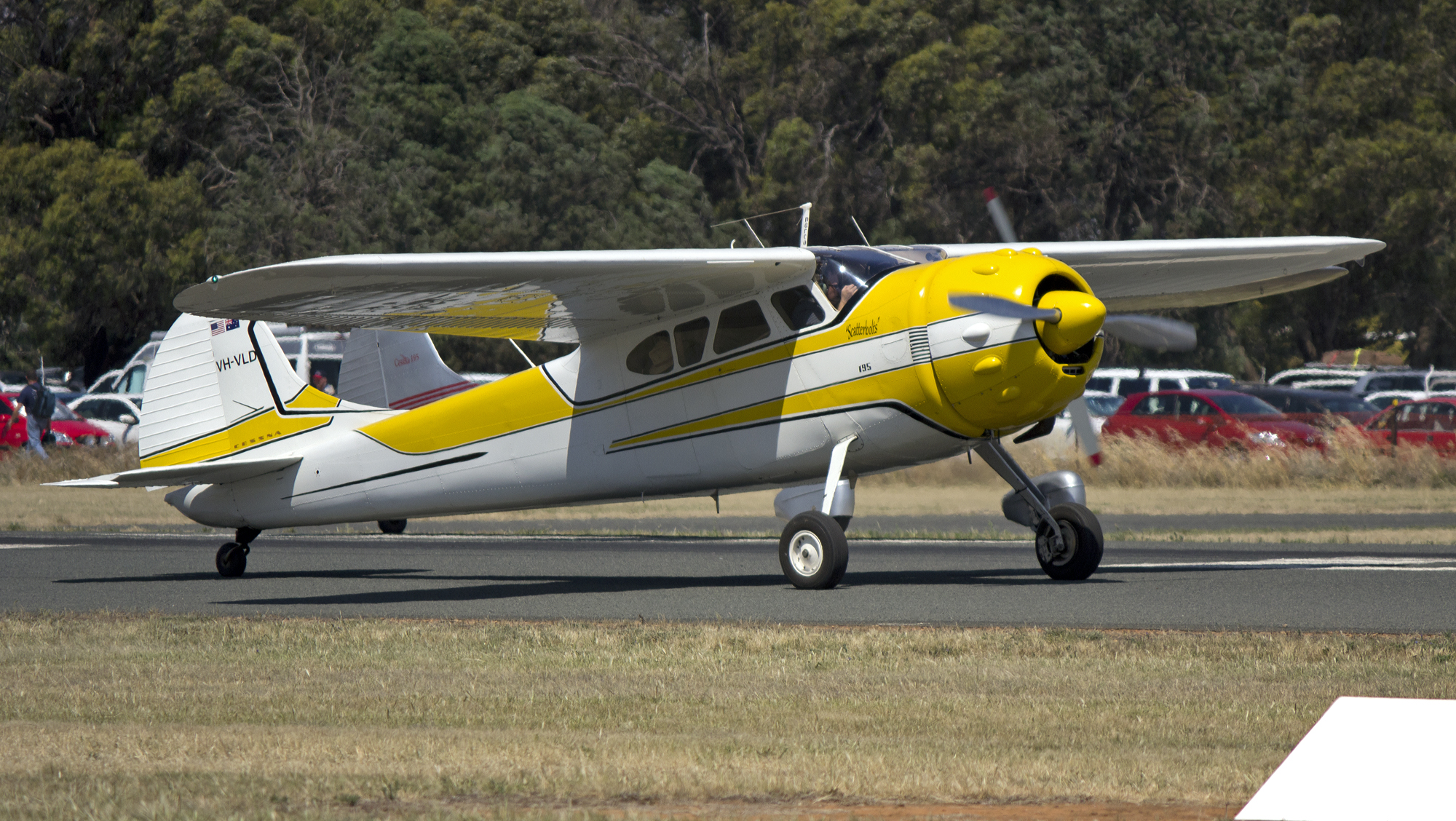
1953 Cessna 195B

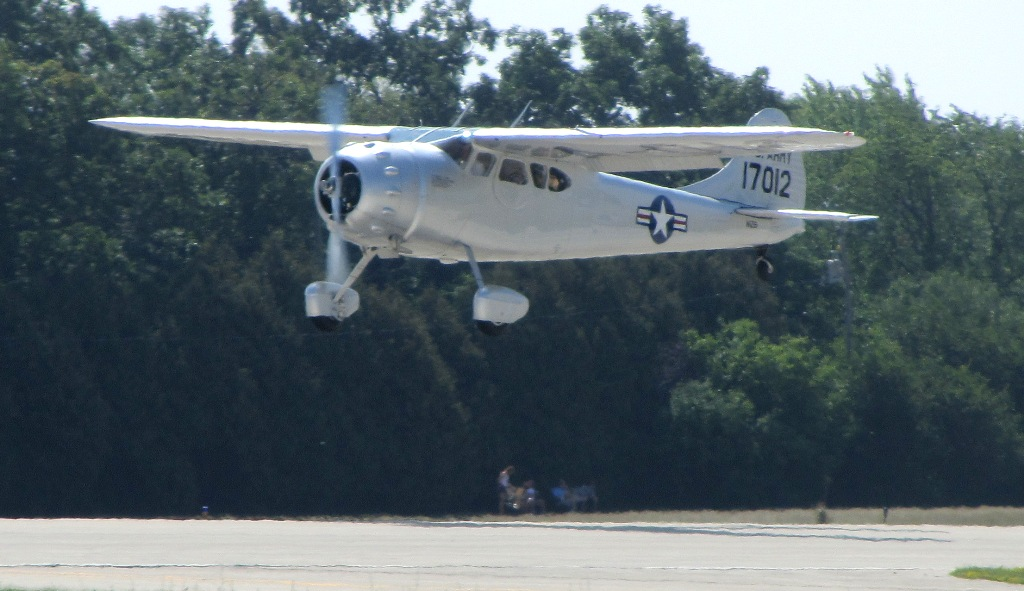
Cessna LC-126C landing

The main difference between the 190 and the 195 models was the engine installed.

190
Powered by a Continental W670-23 engine of 240 hp (180 kW) and first certified on 1 July 1947.
195
Powered by a Jacobs R-755A2 engine of 300 hp (225 kW) and first certified on 12 June 1947.
195A
Powered by a Jacobs L-4MB (R-755-9) engine of 245 hp (184 kW) and first certified on 6 January 1950.
195B
Powered by a Jacobs R-755B2 engine of 275 hp (206 kW) and first certified on 31 March 1952. It featured flaps increased in area by 50% over earlier models.
LC-126A
Military designation for the Cessna 195, five-seat communication aircraft for the US Army, it could be fitted with skis or floats, 15 built.
LC-126B
Similar aircraft to the LC-126 for Air National Guard use, five built.
LC-126C
Variant of the LC-126A for instrument training/liaison, 63 built.
U-20B
LC-126B redesignated by the USAF after 1962.
U-20C
LC-126C redesignated by the USAF after 1962.

== Operators ==
=== Civil ===
The Cessna 190 and 195 have been popular with private individuals and companies, and have also been operated by some air charter companies and small feeder airlines.

=== Military ===
Cuba

- Fuezas Aéreas Ejército de Cuba operated a single Cessna 190 in the early 1950s.

United States

- Army National Guard
- United States Army
- United States Air Force

== Specifications (Cessna 195) ==
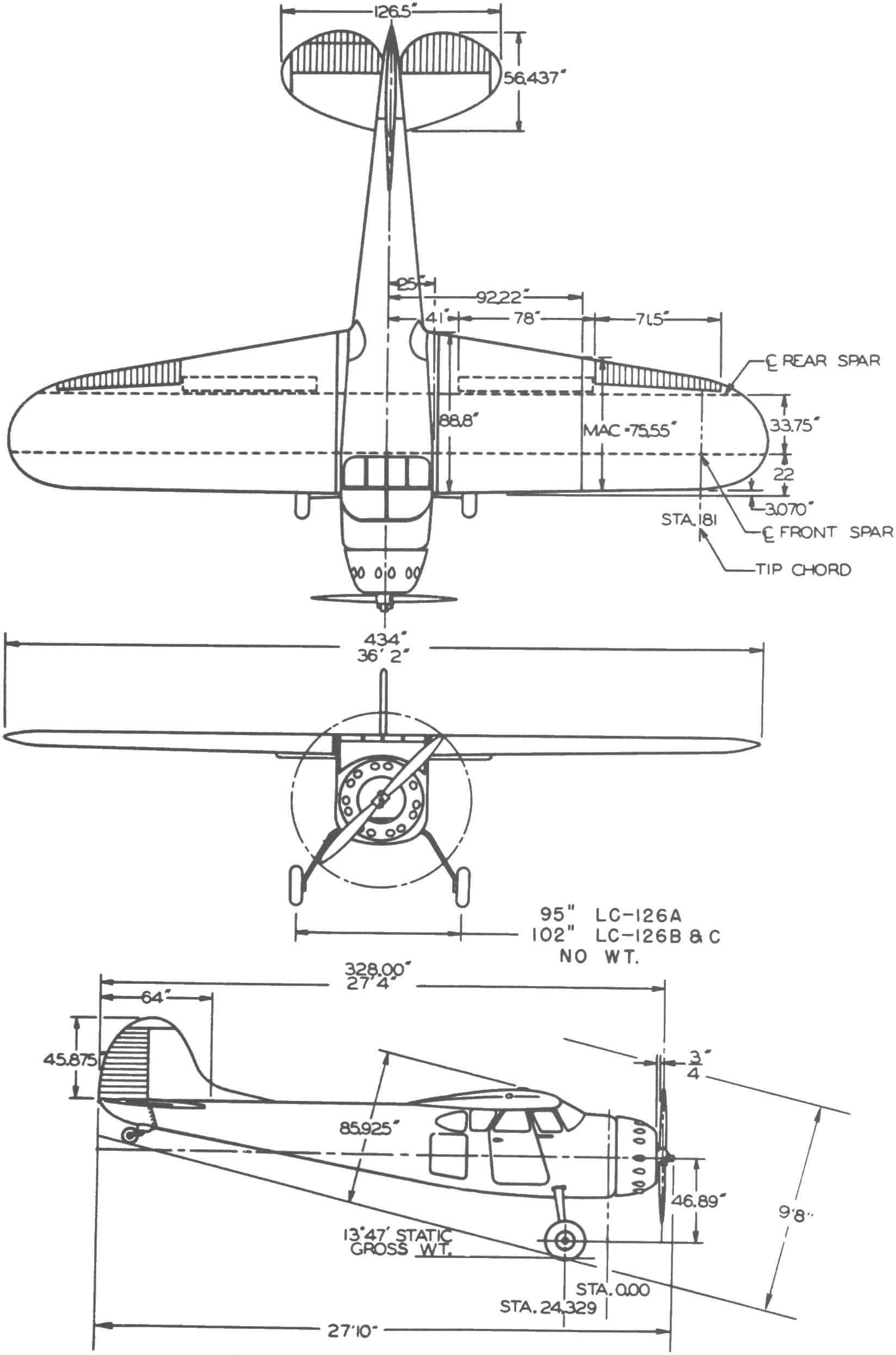
3-view line drawing of the Cessna LC-126

Data from The Complete Guide to Single Engine Cessna, 3rd Edition

General characteristics

- Crew: one
- Capacity: four passengers
- Length: 27 ft 4 in (8.33 m)
- Wingspan: 36 ft 2 in (11.02 m)
- Height: 7 ft 2 in (2.18 m)
- Empty weight: 2,100 lb (953 kg)
- Gross weight: 3,350 lb (1,520 kg)
- Fuel capacity: 75 US gallons (280 L; 62 imp gal)
- Powerplant: 1 × Jacobs R-755 radial engine, 300 hp (220 kW)
- Propellers: 2-bladed Hamilton Standard constant speed propeller

Performance

- Maximum speed: 178 mph (286 km/h, 155 kn)
- Cruise speed: 170 mph (270 km/h, 150 kn) at 70% power
- Stall speed: 62 mph (100 km/h, 54 kn) power off, flaps 45°
- Never exceed speed: 200 mph (320 km/h, 170 kn)
- Range: 800 mi (1,300 km, 700 nmi) at 70% power
- Service ceiling: 18,300 ft (5,600 m)
- Rate of climb: 1,200 ft/min (6.1 m/s)
- Wing loading: 15.36 lb/sq ft (75.0 kg/m^{2})

== See also ==
Aircraft of comparable role, configuration, and era

- Beechcraft Staggerwing
- Stinson Reliant
