= Cessna EC-2 =

1930s American aircraft

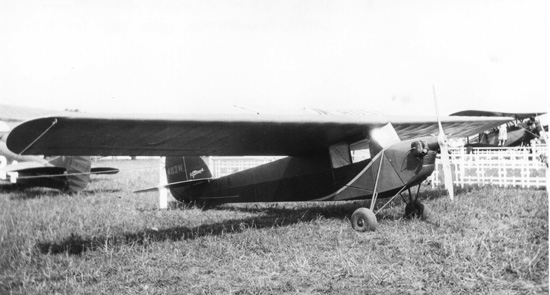

General information
- Type: Light Tourer Glider
- National origin: USA
- Manufacturer: Cessna Aircraft Company
- Designer: Eldon Cessna
- Registration: N403W, N405W

History
- Manufactured: 1930
- Retired: January 10, 1940

The Cessna Model EC-2 was a 1930s American two-seat tourer built by the Cessna Aircraft Company. They developed the Model EC-2, a low-cost aircraft, as a response to the market downturn caused by the Great Depression. Only one prototype was built and it did not go into production. A single-seat version, the Model EC-1, was also developed.

== Design and development ==
Cessna Aircraft was suffering in the depression and downturn in the economy following the Wall Street crash. Eldon Cessna, the son of Clyde Cessna designed a low-cost, cheap-to-operate aircraft to meet the new conditions. The Model EC-2 was powered by an Aeronca 30 hp (22 kW) E-107A engine. It did not go into production and one of the prototype was cancelled while the other crashed years later when a student stalled it with an instructor. As a first step in the project, a single-seat version of the Model EC-1 was developed as an ongoing evolution of the Cessna CG-2 Primary Glider, using small engines. Archival evidence so far indicates only two were produced, N403W and N405W. The plane has picked up the nickname "the Baby Cessna." The color was red with a creme side stripe.

== Specifications ==
General characteristics

- Crew: 2
- Fuel capacity: 8 Gal.

Performance

== See also ==
Related development

- Cessna EC-1
