= Cessna 187 =

American light aircraft prototype

General information
- Type: Light aircraft
- National origin: United States
- Manufacturer: Cessna
- Number built: 1

History
- First flight: April 22, 1968

The Cessna 187 was a prototype light aircraft built by American manufacturer Cessna in the late 1960s. As the newer Model 177 had been intended to replace the 172, so the 187 was intended to replace the 182.

== Design ==
The Model 187 shape was similar to the 177, with a high cantilever wing similar to that of the Model 210, an all-moving tailplane, and tubular main landing gear struts. The 187's stabilator was mounted atop the vertical tail in a T-tail configuration, though a conventional configuration was also tested.

Cabin doors on the 187 resembled the wide doors of the 177, and since there was no wing strut to impede its movement, the door opened to more than 90°. The windshield was more highly sloped than that of the 182, similar to the deep slope of the 177 windshield. The aft fuselage included a rear window with slope similar to that of the 177. There was room for four people, and a baggage area, with a separate access door on the pilot's (left) side. The 187 was powered by a single Continental O-470-R which delivered 230 hp (170 kW).

== Development ==
=== Prototype stage ===
The program entered initial design as the Model 343 in 1965, before the Model 177 had been officially introduced. The Model 343 was renamed to Model 187 in 1968 after its intended powerplant was changed from the 240 hp (180 kW) Continental GIO-336 to the Continental O-470. Construction of the first prototype began in early 1968. Only one flying aircraft, with serial number 666 and tail number N7167C, was completed. Static test articles were also constructed, but were not tested to their full strength before the program was canceled.

First flight was on 22 April 1968.

=== Program cancellation ===
There were a few problems during flight testing, such as blanking and partial stalling of the stabilator during stalls, an empty weight greater than that of the airplane it was intended to replace, and nose heaviness. However, the greatest obstacle to the program's acceptance was that the more complex wing's manufacturing cost would have pushed the aircraft price out of the acceptable marketing niche. The program was ultimately canceled after flight testing showed no significant improvements over the Model 182.

== See also ==
Related development

- Cessna 177

Aircraft of comparable role, configuration, and era

- Cessna 182
