= Teratocarcinoma-derived growth factor 1 =

Protein-coding gene in the species Homo sapiens

CRIPTO

Identifiers
- Aliases: CRIPTO, CR, CRGF, teratocarcinoma-derived growth factor 1, CR-1, TDGF1
- External IDs: MGI: 98658; HomoloGene: 2416; GeneCards: CRIPTO; OMA:CRIPTO - orthologs

Gene location (Human)
Chr.	Chromosome 3 (human)
Band	3p21.31	Start	46,574,534 bp
Band	3p21.31	End	46,582,457 bp

Gene location (Mouse)
Chr.	Chromosome 9 (mouse)
Band	9 F2|9 60.79 cM	Start	110,768,671 bp
Band	9 F2|9 60.79 cM	End	110,775,226 bp
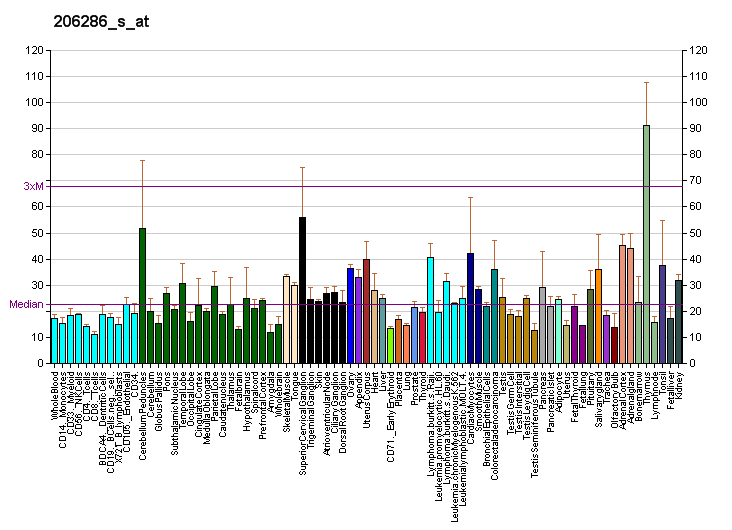
RNA expression pattern
Bgee	Human / Mouse (ortholog); Top expressed in: gonad; spleen; testicle; human kidney; left ovary; rectum; mucosa of transverse colon; right ovary; smooth muscle tissue; endometrium / Top expressed in: superior surface of tongue; embryo; blastocyst; epiblast; embryo; morula; morula; mesoderm; bulbus cordis; cardiac muscle tissue of left ventricle; More reference expression data
BioGPS	More reference expression data
Gene ontology
Molecular function	protein binding; growth factor activity; signaling receptor binding; nodal binding; activin receptor binding
Cellular component	membrane; plasma membrane; cell surface; apical plasma membrane; membrane raft; anchored component of membrane; extrinsic component of plasma membrane; extracellular space; extracellular region
Biological process	cell differentiation; cellular response to interleukin-6; epidermal growth factor receptor signaling pathway; somatic stem cell population maintenance; positive regulation of cell migration; cellular response to hepatocyte growth factor stimulus; cellular response to tumor necrosis factor; negative regulation of apoptotic process; cellular response to fibroblast growth factor stimulus; morphogenesis of a branching structure; cell migration involved in sprouting angiogenesis; mammary gland development; positive regulation of endothelial cell migration; cellular response to epidermal growth factor stimulus; development of the heart; regulation of signal transduction; peptidyl-serine phosphorylation; positive regulation of cell population proliferation; positive regulation of peptidyl-tyrosine phosphorylation; cellular response to interferon-gamma; anterior/posterior axis specification, embryo; regulation of signaling receptor activity; embryo development ending in birth or egg hatching; determination of left/right symmetry; anterior/posterior pattern specification; BMP signaling pathway; nodal signaling pathway; anatomical structure development
Sources:Amigo / QuickGO
Orthologs
Species	Human	Mouse
Entrez	6997	21667
Ensembl	ENSG00000241186	ENSMUSG00000032494
UniProt	P13385	P51865
RefSeq (mRNA)	NM_003212; NM_001174136	NM_011562
RefSeq (protein)	NP_001167607; NP_003203	n/a
Location (UCSC)	Chr 3: 46.57 – 46.58 Mb	Chr 9: 110.77 – 110.78 Mb
PubMed search
- Wikidata
View/Edit Human	View/Edit Mouse

Teratocarcinoma-derived growth factor 1 is a protein that in humans is encoded by the CRIPTO gene (previously TDGF1). The protein is an extracellular, membrane-bound signaling protein that plays an essential role in embryonic development and tumor growth. Mutations in this gene are associated with forebrain defects. Pseudogenes of this gene are found on chromosomes 2, 3, 6, 8, 19 and X. Alternate splicing results in multiple transcript variants.

== See also ==
Cripto
