= Cessna CR-3 =

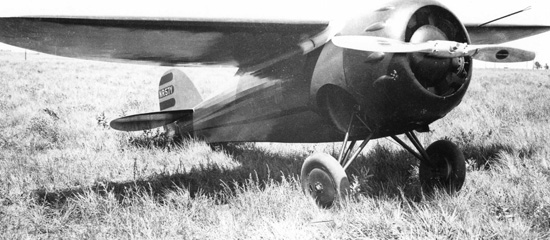

General information
- Type: Air racer
- National origin: United States of America
- Manufacturer: Cessna
- Designer: Clyde Cessna, Eldon Cessna
- Status: Crashed
- Number built: 1

History
- Introduction date: June 17, 1933
- First flight: June 11, 1933
- Retired: August 1933
- Developed from: Cessna CR-2

The Cessna CR-3 was a shoulder-wing racing monoplane that was a follow-up to the Cessna CR-2, named Miss Wanda, that competed in the 1932 National Air Races.

== Development ==
The CR-3 was ordered by air racer Johnny Livingston in response to the performance he saw when competing against the Cessna CR-2 in the 1932 National Air Races. The CR-3 was of shoulder-wing design.

== Design ==
The CR-3 was a shoulder-wing radial engined taildragger racer with manual retractable landing gear and a tail skid. The propeller was from a clipped wing Monocoupe racer #14. The tail surface was designed to be neutral, without downforce in flight. The elevators experienced significant vibration in test flights without the wing root fairings installed.

== Operational history ==
The CR-3 lasted 61 days, winning every event it competed in:

- Omaha Air Races at Omaha, Nebraska, June 17, 1933: First place.
- Minneapolis Air Races and Minneapolis, Minnesota, June 24, 1933: First place.
- American Air Races at Chicago, Illinois, July 1, 1933: The CR-3 first raced against Cessna CR-2 at these races. The CR-3 won the Baby Ruth Trophy at a speed of 201.42 mph (324.35 km/h). It also set a world speed record for aircraft with engines of under 500-cubic-inches′ (8.2 liters′) capacity at 237.4 mph (382.3 km/h).
- Aero Digest Trophy race, July 4, 1933: First place.

En route to an airshow in August 1933, the CR-3 experienced a failure of both the tail skid and a landing gear weld that would not allow the gear to lock. Livingston bailed out over Columbus, Ohio and the CR-3 was destroyed in its ensuing crash.

== Specifications ==
Data from Sport Aviation

General characteristics

- Length: 17 ft (5.2 m)
- Wingspan: 18 ft 5 in (5.61 m)
- Height: 4 ft 6 in (1.37 m)
- Empty weight: 750 lb (340 kg)
- Powerplant: 1 × Warner Super Scarab Radial, 145 hp (108 kW)

Performance

- Maximum speed: 222 kn (255 mph, 410 km/h) demonstrated
- Stall speed: 56 kn (65 mph, 105 km/h)

== See also ==
Related development

- Cessna GC-1
- Cessna CR-1
- Cessna CR-2
