= Cessna X210 =

American prototype light aircraft

General information
- Type: Light personal and business aircraft
- National origin: United States
- Manufacturer: Cessna Aircraft Company
- Status: Canceled
- Number built: 1

History
- First flight: January 1950
- Retired: 1950
- Developed from: Cessna 195

The Cessna X210 (also known as simply Cessna 210, not to be confused with the later aircraft of the same name) was a prototype light aircraft designed by Cessna as a potential replacement for the Cessna 195.

== Design and development ==
Work on a potential replacement for the Cessna 195 began in 1949. The resulting in the Model X210 was similar to the 195, sharing the latter's basic design and conventional landing gear configuration, but was powered by a 240 hp (179 kW) Continental O-470 flat-six engine mounted on a redesigned forward fuselage. Other differences included a square vertical tail and wingtips, replacing the rounded units on the 195. The X210 also featured high-lift flaps and tubular steel main landing gear.

== Operational history ==
The sole X210, registered N41695 (c/n 602), made its first flight in January 1950. Flight testing did not show a significant improvement in performance over the 195. This, coupled with the demand for L-19 Bird Dog production due the Korean War, led to the program's cancellation in 1950. The X210 was not directly related to the Cessna 210 Centurion, though several design features of the X210 did inspire later Cessna aircraft.
