= Cessna CG-2 =

American glider of the 1930s

Model CG-2
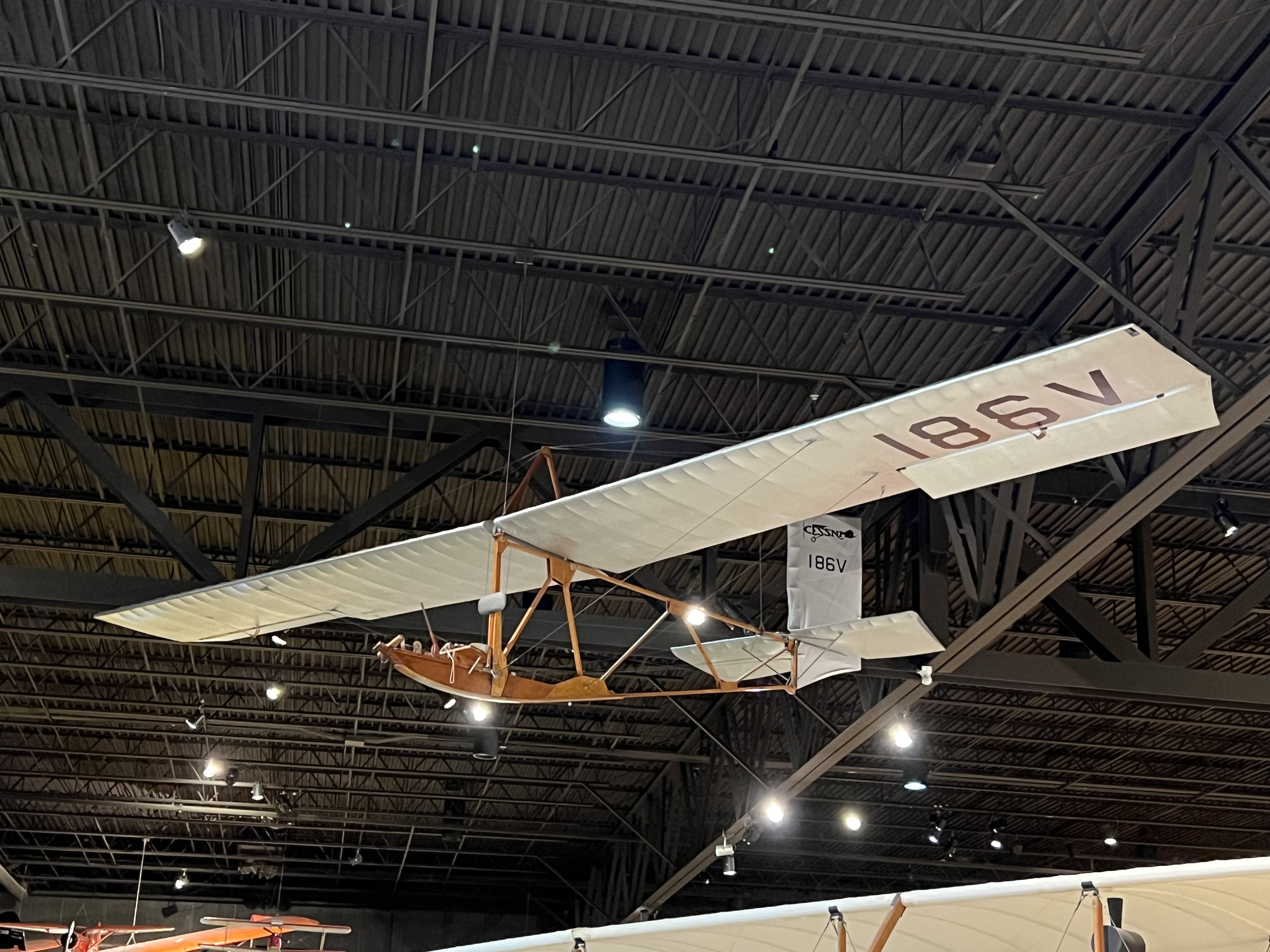
- A CG-2 on display

General information
- Type: Primary Glider
- Manufacturer: Cessna Aircraft Company
- Designer: Clyde Cessna, Eldon Cessna

History
- Manufactured: 1930-1932
- Introduction date: 1930

The Cessna Model CG-2 is an American primary glider built by the Cessna Aircraft Company in the early 1930s.

== Design and development ==
In 1930, the Cessna Aircraft Company was suffering from the effects of the Great Depression, which drastically reduced civil aircraft sales. Clyde Cessna, the company's principal founder, needed a solution. Clyde's son Eldon Cessna suggested building gliders, which were simple and cheap to construct, and would keep the company afloat until customers resumed purchasing more advanced (and expensive) powered aircraft.

The result was a simple primary glider known as the Model CG-2, known internally as the Cessna Glider, model 2, introduced in 1930 and inspired by German primary gliders of the era. It was marketed by Cessna via catalog at a price of only $398 ($7,671 in 2025); one reason for its low price was that it was sold as a kit, crated with an assembly manual and a bungee cord launch system. The advertising campaign promised that "man might fly first, without power, in safety"; another advertisement stated that "glider pilots will be future transport pilots".

Production figures for the Model CG-2 are not precisely known. Cessna records show that only 54 CG-2 gliders were sold; however, some sources state that Cessna manufactured at least 300 CG-2s.

CG-2 sales generated sufficient funds to keep Cessna operating until 1932, when the company shut down for a period of two years.

== Operational Usage ==
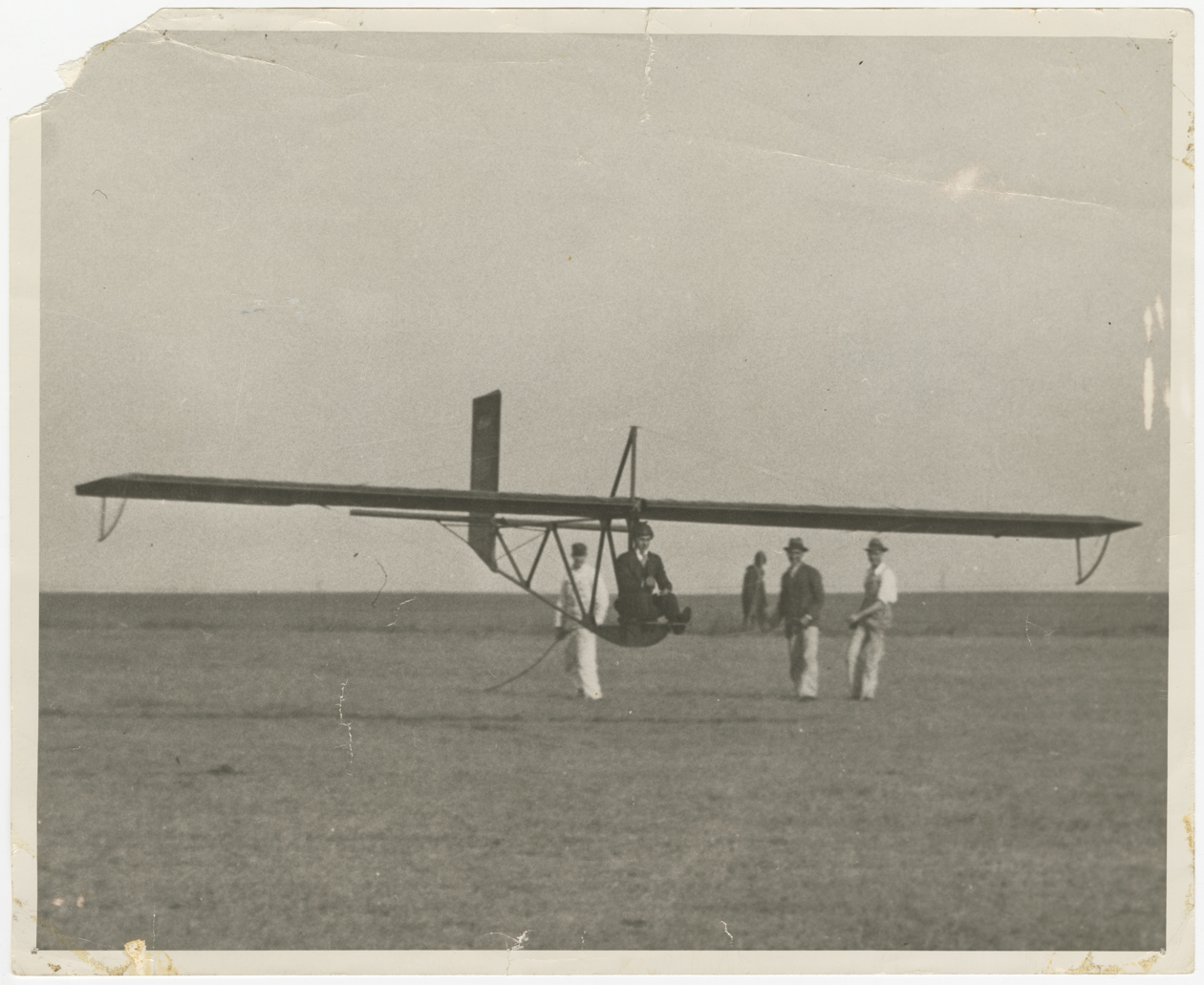
Men with a Cessna CG-2 glider in the 1930s

Once the CG-2 had been assembled the glider could be launched via the bungee cord method, as supplied with the glider, or it could be towed by an automobile or airplane.

Longer flights could also be achieved by launching the glider off a hill or ridge.

== Surviving Examples ==
There are two known examples of a CG-2 on display in a museum.

- One example is on display at the EAA Airventure Museum in Oshkosh, Wisconsin.
- A single example resides on display at the Museum of Flight in Seattle, Washington.

== Variants ==
- Cessna CPG-1 - A motorized variant using a 10 hp (7.4 kW) Cleone engine.
- Cessna CS-1 - A sailplane variant.
- Cessna EC-2 - A small one-seat monoplane derivative, with enclosed cockpit, powered.

== Specifications ==
Data from AirVenture Museum website

General characteristics

- Crew: one pilot
- Length: 18 ft 0 in (5.49 m)
- Wingspan: 36 ft 2 in (11.02 m)
- Height: 6 ft 10 in (2.08 m)
- Wing area: 157 sq ft (14.6 m^{2})
- Empty weight: 120 lb (54 kg)

Performance

- Maximum speed: 25 mph (40 km/h, 22 kn)
- Cruise speed: 20 mph (32 km/h, 17 kn)
- Stall speed: 15 mph (24 km/h, 13 kn)
