= Cessna CR-1 =

American air racer built by Cessna

General information
- Type: Air racer
- National origin: United States of America
- Manufacturer: Clyde V. Cessna Aircraft Company
- Number built: 1

History
- Variant: Cessna CR-2

The Cessna CR-1 was a short-lived air racer that was part of the CR series of Cessna racers.

== Design and development ==
The Cessna CR-1 was built using $1200 in winnings from the Cessna GC-1.

The aircraft was a mid-wing open cockpit taildragger using a fabric covered wooden wing structure. The landing gear was manually retractable into the fuselage.

== Operational history ==
The aircraft was tested by Eldon Cessna. The one and only flight required a 100 mph launch speed, and 130 mph approach speed to keep the aircraft controllable.

== Variants ==
After the sole test flight, the CR-1 was grounded and redesigned as the Cessna CR-2.

== Specifications (Cessna CR-1) ==
Data from Sport Aviation

General characteristics

- Capacity: 1
- Length: 12 ft (3.7 m)
- Wingspan: 16 ft (4.9 m)
- Wing area: 40 sq ft (3.7 m^{2})
- Powerplant: 1 × Warner Scarab 422 radial, 110 hp (82 kW)

== See also ==
Related development

- Cessna GC-1
- Cessna CR-2
- Cessna CR-3
