= Cessna CR-2 =

Mid-winged racing aircraft

General information
- Type: Air racer
- National origin: United States of America
- Manufacturer: Clyde V. Cessna Aircraft Company
- Number built: 1

History
- First flight: May 1930
- Retired: Crash in Shell Speed Dash in 1933
- Variant: Cessna CR-1

The Cessna CR-2 was a mid-winged racing aircraft in the CR series of Cessna racers.

== Design and development ==
The Cessna CR-1 proved to be too difficult to handle, requiring a redesign of the aircraft. The new plane had an additional 2 foot of wing, and 2 foot of fuselage length.

The aircraft was a mid-wing open cockpit taildragger using a fabric covered wooden wing structure. The landing gear was manually retractable into the fuselage. In 1932 the aircraft was rebuilt with thinner wings, retractable landing gear, and a 499 cubic inch Warner engine.

== Operational history ==
The CR-2 was test-flown by Roy Ligget in May 1930. The aircraft took the name "Miss Wanda".

- 1930 Omaha Air Races - The CR-2 placed fourth in the under 500c.i. class, and fifth in the unlimited class. Nearly losing the CR-2, the pilot, John Livingston, ordered an updated version, the Cessna CR-3.
- 1930 National Air Races Pilots Bill Ong placed second in the 650c.i. category, third in the 800c.i. category, and second in the 450c.i. category. Pilot Mae Haizlip placed second in the Women's Free For All.
- 1932 National Air Races Roy Ligget placed second in the 510c.i. race, third in the 800c.i. race and third in the Cleveland Cincinnati race.
- 1933 Miami Races - won the Col. Green cup in the 500c.i. race
- 1933 Chicago American Air Races - Roy Ligget placed second to the newer Cessna CR-3.
- 1933 Aero Digest Trophy Race - Second place again to the CR-3
- 1933 Chicago International Air Races - Pilot R.O. Herman flew with a modified cowling.
- 1933 Shell Speed Dash - Pilot Ligget suffered a cowling failure that struck the wing and caused a somersaulting crash.

== Specifications (Cessna CR-2) ==
Data from Sport Aviation

General characteristics

- Capacity: 1
- Length: 14 ft 10 in (4.52 m)
- Wingspan: 18 ft 4 in (5.59 m)
- Empty weight: 677 lb (307 kg)
- Powerplant: 1 × Warner Scarab air-cooled radial piston engine, 110 hp (82 kW)

== See also ==
Related development

- Cessna GC-1
- Cessna CR-1
- Cessna CR-3
