= CR-1 visa =

United States immigrant visa

A CR-1 visa is a United States immigrant visa that allows a spouse of a US citizen to enter the US as a conditional permanent resident (hence the abbreviation "CR"). The Department of State issues the CR-1 to spouses who have been married for less than two years; spouses who have been married longer receive the IR-1 visa.

A sponsor files for a CR-1 visa by submitting Form I-130, Petition for Alien Relative.

== Eligibility requirements ==
To petition for a CR-1 spousal visa, the US petitioner must be a US citizen or lawful permanent resident, and in order to sign the affidavit of support, the petitioner must be at least 18 years old. Being legally married to the alien beneficiary is a requirement. Evidence of an immigrant's financial support is also needed to show they are not likely to rely on the U.S government.
