= Ada Rogato =

Brazilian pilot

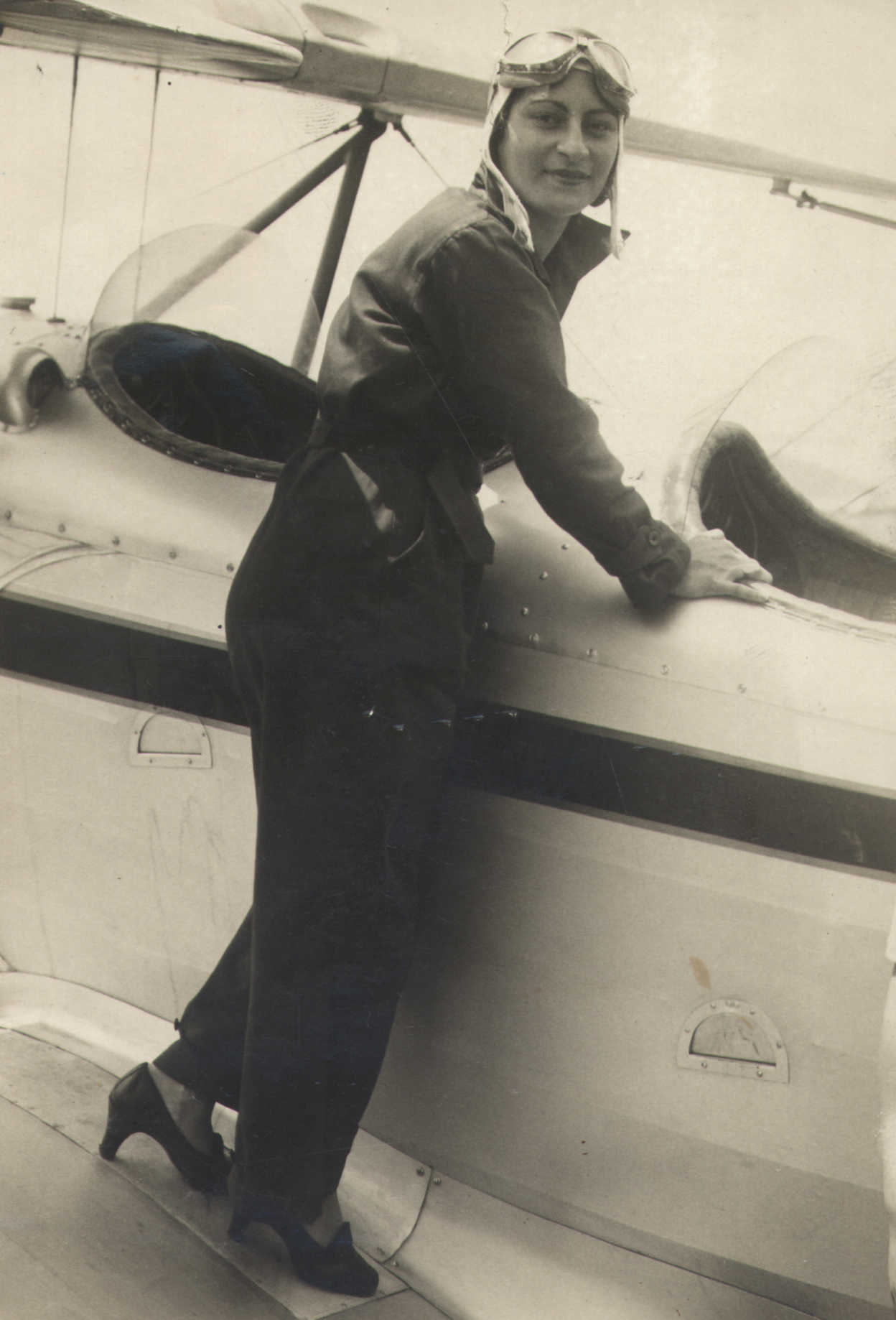
- In 1936.
- Born: 22 December 1910; São Paulo, Brazil
- Died: 15 November 1986 (aged 75); São Paulo, Brazil
- Other names: Ada Rogato
- Occupation: aviator
- Years active: 1935–1986
- Known for: First woman glider pilot and first woman paratrooper of Brazil. Numerous flight records.

Ada Rogato (22 December 1910 – 15 November 1986) was a pioneering woman aviator from Brazil. She broke five records, becoming the first South American woman to earn a glider pilot's license and the first Brazilian woman to earn paratrooper certification. She broke the world record for the longest solo flight, was the first to fly across all three of the Americas and held the Brazilian record for the number of parachute jumps. She was also Brazil's first woman agricultural pilot, flying crop dusters for the Biological Institute to eliminate pests which were destroying the country's coffee crop.

== Early life ==
Ada Rogato (Note: The Biological Institute notes that when Rogato was hired she used the name Ada Leda Rogato until 1954 when she removed Leda, stating it was not shown on her birth certificate. This would be born out by press clippings, which repeatedly use "Ada Leda" in the early part of her career.) was born on 22 December 1910 in São Paulo, Brazil to Maria Rosa (née Greco) and Guglielmo Rogato. Her parents were immigrants from San Marco Argentano, Italy. Her education was typical for girls of her era, minimal schooling, learning painting and taking piano lessons. From a young age, Rogato wanted to learn to fly, but when her parents separated, she had to help her mother by doing domestic work and selling embroideries and handicrafts to make ends meet. Saving her earnings, she was able to secure enough money to take flying classes at the Flying Club of São Paulo and earn her class "C" glider pilot's license in 1935, becoming the first Brazilian and first South American woman glider pilot.

In 1936, Rogato took additional lessons and passed her testing to become an airplane pilot, flying various types of American-made planes, as well as Brazilian-made planes like the Muniz M-7, Muniz M-9, among others. She was the third licensed airplane pilot of Brazil, following Teresa De Marzo and Anésia Pinheiro Machado. She flew as a test pilot for light aircraft built in Brazil and begin flying in air shows. Needing to earn a living, she took a typing course and applied to enter the civil service.

== Career ==
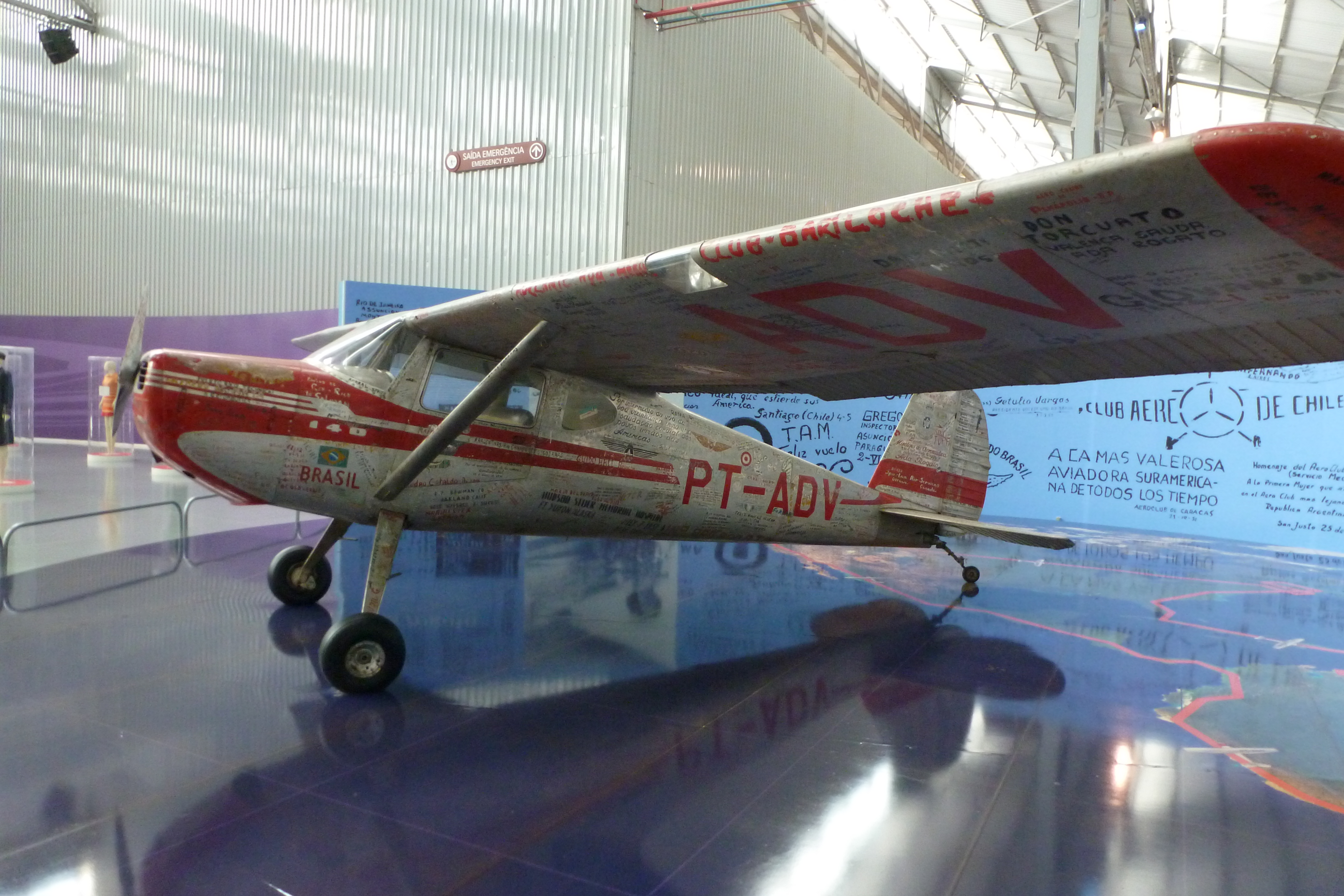
Ada Rogato's Cessna 140, at the Museu da TAM in São Carlos, Brazil

In 1940, Rogato began working as a secretary at the Biological Institute, replacing the previous temporary secretary. She took a course on library science to improve her skill and asked to be allowed leave to continue her participation in "Wing Week" activities. The following year, Rogato took a skydiving course, gaining the first Brazilian paratrooper certification and bought a Paulistinha two-seater airplane. Upon receipt of her paratrooper certification, the Aeronautics Ministry asked for Rogato to be allowed a three-month leave to offer training at the Technical School of Aviation. During World War II, she performed volunteer missions, patrolling the Litoral Paulista (coast of São Paulo). For her service, she became the first woman to receive the title of Pilot in Honoris Causa by the Brazilian Air Force. In 1942, Rogato performed a daring night parachute jump. She was the only woman and was accompanied by five men, who jumped from a Focke-Wulf plane into the bay off the coast of Rio de Janeiro. The president, Getúlio Vargas was on hand to witness the jump and the parachutists rescue by the two boats waiting at the ready.

When Rogato returned to the Biological Institute, she was assigned to the Animal Health Surveillance Section, which led to their recruitment for her to serve as the first woman agricultural pilot in 1948. As she had accumulated over 1,200 flying hours, the Institute hired her to spray insecticide in an effort to eliminate the plague of borer beetles which were damaging the country's coffee crop. She worked as a crop duster, spraying the insecticide Gamexame (hexachloro- cyclohexane), while wearing protective gear. The insecticide was later banned as a health hazard, but not before Rogato had her only serious accident, when a malfunction of the spraying apparatus caused her to crash. Rogato was hospitalized for a month and it was later speculated that the exposure to the chemicals may have led to her development of cancer. After her recuperation, Rogato returned to crop-dusting.

In 1950, Rogato took a sabbatical from the Biological Institute and flew at her own expense to participate in airshows in Argentina, Chile and Paraguay. While in Chile, she became the first woman to skydive in the country and won applause when she landed with a Brazilian and Chilean flag. She was awarded a commendation by the Chilean government. She crossed the Andes in her Paulistinha and was awarded an aeronautical merit medal for the accomplishment. She was also given a Cessna 140, which he would use the following year on her record-breaking flight. In 1951, she broke the longest solo flight record when she flew 51,064 miles from Tierra del Fuego to Anchorage, Alaska over a six-month period. Flying south from Rio de Janeiro, she went to Uruguay and then Argentina before crossing the Andes, traversing the west coast of South America, Central America and North America to reach Anchorage. From Anchorage, she flew to the farthest north airport, at Fort Yukon at the Arctic Circle. She then retraced her flight to Seattle and flew to Washington, D.C. and on to Montreal and Ottawa in Canada before heading to the Caribbean to fly through Cuba, Haiti, the Dominican Republic, Puerto Rico, Trinidad, Venezuela, all three Guyanas before returning to Brazil. The voyage was billed as a good-neighbor tour and she met with the first ladies of each of the 17 countries through which she flew.

In 1952, Rogato became the first civilian pilot to take-off or land a low-powered aircraft, her Cessna, from El Alto in La Paz, Bolivia, which at that time was the highest altitude airport in the world. In 1956, she undertook an official mission for the São Paulo government, flying to each capital of the Brazilian states and in the process became the first pilot to fly over the Amazon rainforest. In 1960, Rogato set another first, becoming the first woman to arrive at Ushuaia, in Tierra del Fuego, which was the southernmost city in the world at that time. One of the intriguing markers of Rogato's career is that all of her flights were completed as solo voyages in low-powered aircraft (85 horsepower or less engine), which did not have sophisticated instrumentation, or even a radio. She held the Brazilian record of parachute jumps with 105 to her credit.

Rogato retired from the civil service in 1980, having attained the position of Sports and Tourism section chief for technical division, but continued to fly until four years before her death. It is said she only stopped flying because she could break no further barriers without a more powerful plane. From 1980 until 1986, Rogato served as the director of the Museum of Aeronautics and Space of São Paulo and also as president of the Santos Dumont Foundation.

== Death and legacy ==
Rogato died on 15 November 1986, in São Paulo and her body was laid in state at the Museum of Aeronautics. She was buried in the Santana Cemetery of São Paulo after a special "squadron of smoke" tribute. Rogato was the first woman to receive the National Commendation of Aeronautical Merit, with the rank of knight. She also became the first woman Wing Commander in the Brazilian Air Force and the title of Pilot in Honoris Causa by the Brazilian Air Force. The government of Chile decorated her as a meritorious Grand Officer of the Order of Bernardo O'Higgins in 1951. In 1952, she received commemorative wings from the Bolivian Air Force for her flight to La Paz. Rogato was also decorated with the wings of the Colombian Air Force and in 1954 received The Paul Tissandier Diploma of Merits in Aviation from the French organization, Aeronautics International.

There is a street in Ribeirão Preto named in her honor and a town square in Lapa which bears her name. In 2000, a stamp was issued by the Brazilian Post Office to commemorate her flight over the Andes. In 2011, the Brazilian writer, Lucita Briza, published a biography of Rogato's life, Ada—Mulher, pioneira, aviadora with C&R Editorial. Rogato's medals and her Cessna have been on display at the TAM Museum in São Carlos since 2012.
