= Muniz M-5 =

General information
- Type: Two/three seat tourer or liaison aircraft
- National origin: France
- Manufacturer: Société des Avions Caudron
- Designer: Antônio Muniz
- Number built: 1

History
- First flight: 10 July 1930

The Muniz M-5 was the first of Antônio Guedes Muniz's aircraft designs to fly; soon afterwards he became the first Brazilian to design an aircraft which reached series production. The sole example of the M-5, built while he was a student in France by Caudron, was a low wing cabin tourer or military liaison aircraft.

== Design and development ==
Antônio Guedes Muniz was a pioneer of the Brazilian aviation industry but he produced his first designs while at the French Ecole Supérieure de Aéronautique. Several studies remained unbuilt before he had the M-5, a two- or three-seat cantilever low wing cabin tourer, built by the Caudron company.

Its wing was straight-tapered in plan out to rounded tips and had an aspect ratio of 8.0, quite high for the time. It had a reflex (double-curved underside) section, 2° of dihedral and thinned continuously to the tips. The wing was built in three parts, with a short, rectangular inner section within the fuselage and two dominant, tapering outer panels. Each outer panel was built around a spruce box spar and the wing surface ahead of it was plywood, forming a torsion resisting D-box. Behind the spar the wing had fabric covering. The M-5's ailerons were long and narrow.

Its rectangular section fuselage was entirely wooden, with spruce longerons and 2 mm (0.08 in) thick plywood covering. The engine was a water-cooled, six cylinder Hispano-Suiza 6Pa with its fuel tanks between the wing spar of the central section, within the lower fuselage. Behind the engine was a multi-windowed cabin with two seats in tandem and fitted with dual controls; without dual control a third tandem seat could be added. The empennage was also wood-framed, with ply-covered fixed surfaces and fabric-covered control surfaces. Like the wings, the tail surfaces were straight-tapered to rounded tips. The tailplane was mounted on top of the fuselage and the elevators were split to allow rudder movement.

The M-5's fixed, tailskid undercarriage had a track of 2.40 m (7 ft 10 in). Its mainwheels were on cranked steel axles hinged on the lower fuselage longerons which also mounted oblique drag struts, forming a V. Vertical legs from the axle ends operated rubber shock absorbers within the wing leading edge, like those used by Klemm light aircraft.

Muniz had hoped that the aircraft would be ready for the August 1929 International Lightplane Tour of Europe but, though in that month the M-5 was reported as "nearly ready", the first flight was not made for almost another year, when it was flown from Issy-les-Moulineaux on 10 July 1930, piloted by Delmotte. Two days later he flew it to Villacoublay, where five days later Muniz displayed it to the Brazilian community. There were several senior military officers there, as the M-5 could be used as a liaison aircraft. After more flights into early August, the initial report was that the M-5 was stable, fast and landed slowly.

It was still undergoing trials at Villacoublay at the start of 1931. Fifteen months later Muniz had returned to Brazil where he went on to design successful trainers like the Muniz M-7 and M-9; it is not known if the M-5 returned with him.

== Specifications ==
Data from Les Ailes August, 1929

General characteristics

- Crew: One
- Capacity: one or two passengers
- Length: 7.21 m (23 ft 8 in)
- Wingspan: 12 m (39 ft 4 in)
- Height: 2.31 m (7 ft 7 in)
- Wing area: 18 m^{2} (190 sq ft)
- Empty weight: 450 kg (992 lb)
- Powerplant: 1 × Hispano 6Pa 6-cylinder, liquid cooled inline, 75 kW (100 hp) nominal power; continuous rating 108 kW (145 hp)
- Propellers: 2-bladed

Performance

- Maximum speed: 205 km/h (127 mph, 111 kn) at ground level
- Cruise speed: 185 km/h (115 mph, 100 kn)
- Stall speed: 65 km/h (40 mph, 35 kn) minimum speed at ground level
- Endurance: 5 h
- Service ceiling: 6,500 m (21,300 ft) absolute
