= CNNA =

Airplane manufacturer in the Brazil

Companhia Aeronáutica de Navegação Aérea
- Company type: Private
- Industry: Aerospace
- Founded: 1934; 92 years ago
- Founder: Henrique Lage
- Defunct: 1951; 75 years ago
- Headquarters: Rio de Janeiro, Rio de Janeiro (state), Brazil
- Key people: Antônio Muniz
- Products: Aircraft

Companhia Nacional de Navegação Aérea ("National Aerial Navigation Company", usually known as CNNA) was a Brazilian aircraft manufacturer of the 1940s.

== History ==
It produced Antônio Muniz designs under licence, as well as prototypes for a wide range of civil aircraft. Its greatest successes were the HL-1 and HL-6, which were purchased in number by the Brazilian government for the country's aeroclubs as part of a pilot training initiative. Business ceased in 1951.

== Aircraft ==
Summary of aircraft built by CNNA
| Model name | First flight | Number built | Type |
|---|---|---|---|
| Muniz M-7 | 1935 | 28 | Two seat trainer aircraft biplane |
| Muniz M-9 | 1937 | 56 | Two seat trainer aircraft biplane |
| CNNA HL-1 | 1940 | 140 | High-wing utility aircraft |
| CNNA HL-2 | 1940s | 1 | Monoplane utility aircraft |
| CNNA HL-3 | 1940 | 8 | Civil trainer aircraft |
| CNNA HL-6 | 1942 | 60 | Two seat low-wing trainer aircraft |
| CNNA HL-8 | 1943 | 1 | Monoplane low-wing utility aircraft |
| CNNA HL-14 | 1940s | 1 | Civil trainer aircraft |
