= CNNA HL-8 =

HL-8

General information
- Type: Civil transport/utility aircraft
- National origin: Brazil
- Manufacturer: CNNA
- Number built: One

History
- First flight: December 1943

The CNNA HL-8 was a civil transport/utility aircraft developed in Brazil in 1943.

== Development ==
The HL-8 was a low-wing cantilever monoplane with enclosed flight deck and passenger/cargo cabin. It had three engines of 97 kW (130 hp) each, driving fixed-pitch two-blade propellers. One engine was mounted on the leading edge of each wing and the third engine was mounted in the fuselage nose ahead of the cockpit. The landing gear was fixed and was of tailwheel configuration.

The engines were horizontally opposed four-cylinder air-cooled piston engines.

The design was robust, designed to operate from unprepared surfaces. Its payload was over one ton.

== History ==
Only one HL-8 was constructed. The prototype made its first flight in December 1943, and was flight-tested for a year. The decision was made to not put the design into production.
