= CNNA HL-1 =

HL-1
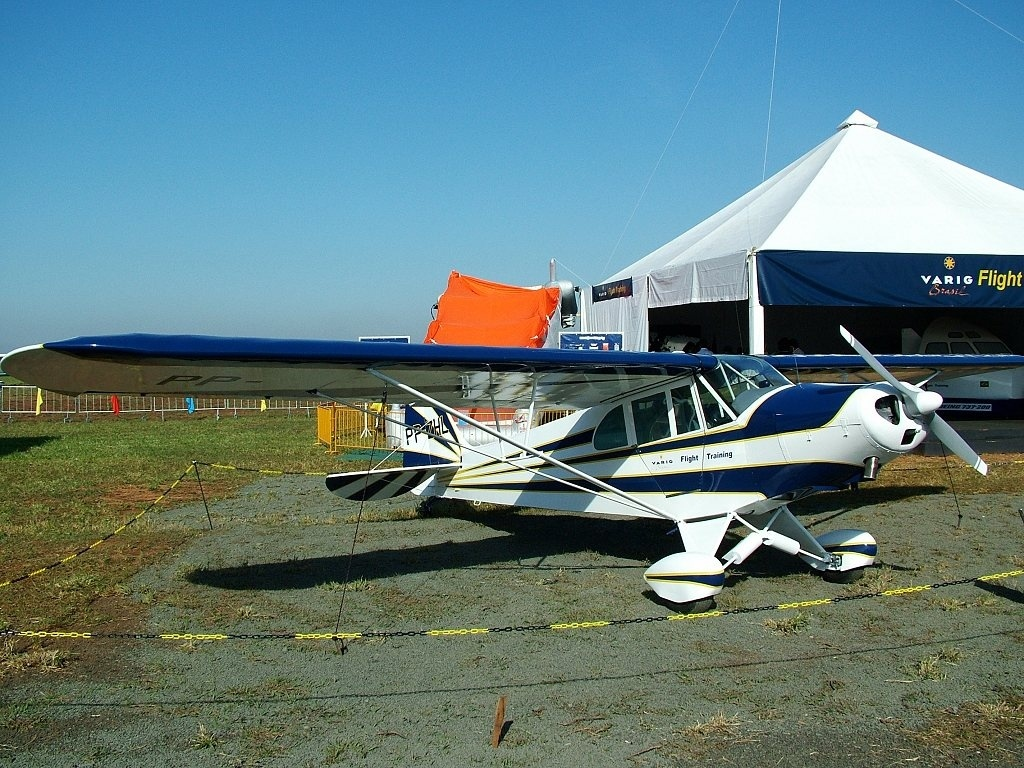
- A HL-1 in Expo Aero Brasil, 2004

General information
- Type: Civil utility aircraft
- Manufacturer: Companhia Nacional de Navegação Aérea (CNNA)
- Number built: 140

History
- First flight: 18 June 1940

The CNNA HL-1 was a light utility aircraft developed in Brazil in 1940. It was a high-wing strut-braced monoplane with fixed tailskid undercarriage and seating for two persons in tandem.

== Development ==
The design was developed by Henrique Lage as a two-seat cabin monoplane, bearing a strong resemblance to the contemporary Piper Cub. It was produced by the Cia Nacionale de Navegaçao Aéreo (CNNA) as the HL-1. Most of the aircraft were purchased by Brazilian aeroclubs, funded by the government's National Aviation Campaign (Campanha Nacional de Aviação) to train pilots for military service. Production continued until 1950 and a small number were exported to neighbouring countries.

== Variants ==
HL-1A
Eight were built.
HL-1B
Main production version with smaller fuel tank than original design.
HL-1C
One prototype constructed
HL-5
Floatplane version. One prototype constructed.

== Specifications ==
Data from Jane's all the World's Aircraft 1947

General characteristics

- Crew: 2
- Empty weight: 340 kg (750 lb)
- Gross weight: 580 kg (1,279 lb)
- Fuel capacity: 50.5 L (13.3 US gal; 11.1 imp gal) (73 Octane); 3.8 L (1.0 US gal; 0.84 imp gal) oil
- Powerplant: 1 × Continental A65-8 4-cyl. air-cooled horizontally-opposed piston engine, 48 kW (65 hp)
- Propellers: 2-bladed fixed pitch wooden propeller

Performance

- Maximum speed: 150 km/h (93 mph, 81 kn)
- Cruise speed: 125 km/h (78 mph, 67 kn)
- Power/mass: 11.935 kg/kW (19.6 lb/hp)
