= CNNA HL-6 =

Civil trainer aircraft developed in Brazil in 1943

HL-6
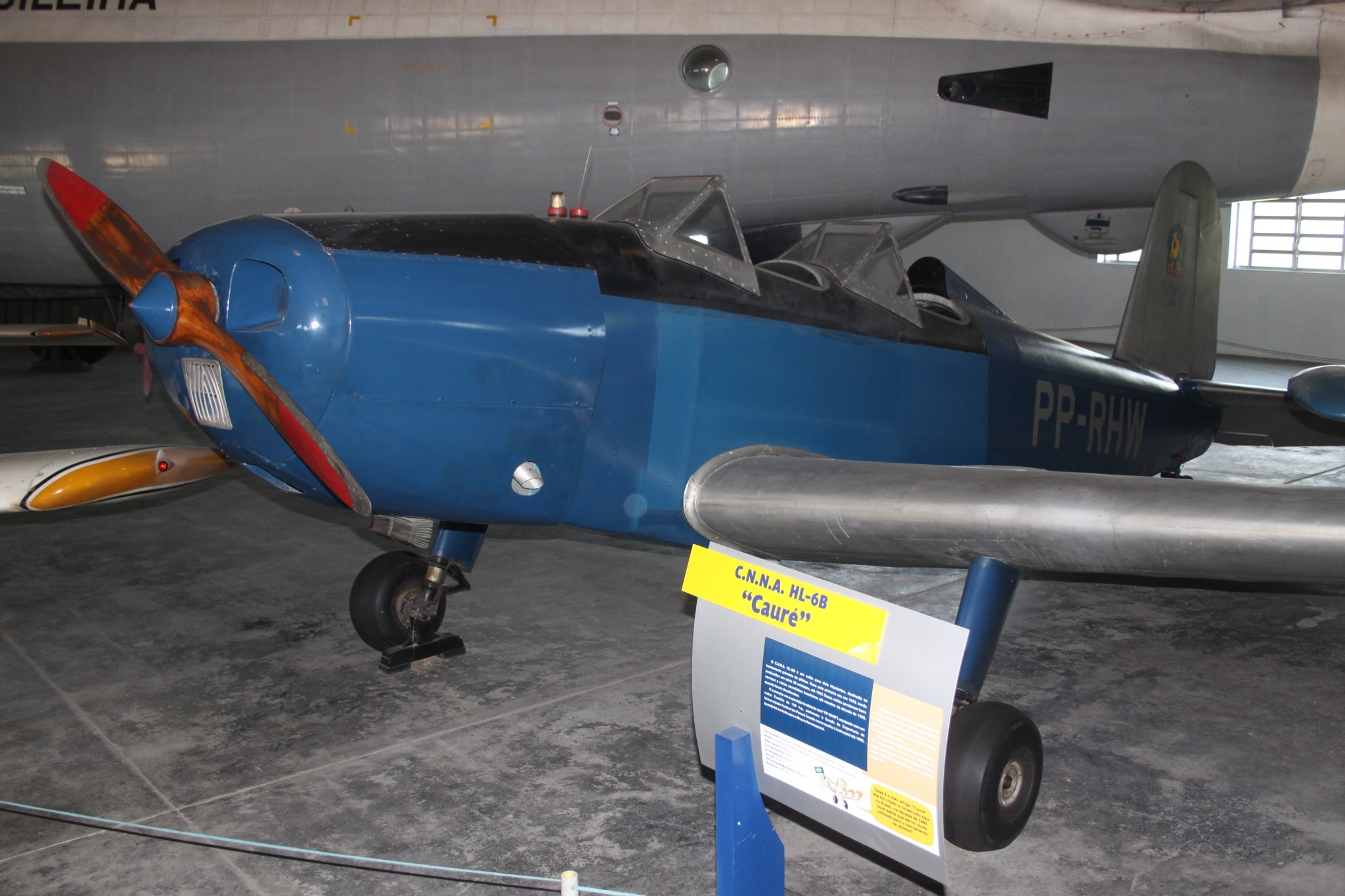

General information
- Type: Civil trainer aircraft
- Manufacturer: CNNA
- Number built: 60

History
- First flight: October 1942

The CNNA HL-6 was a civil trainer aircraft developed in Brazil in 1943.

== Development ==
The HL-6 was a low-wing cantilever monoplane of conventional configuration. It employed a fixed tailskid undercarriage. The student and instructor sat in tandem, in open cockpits.

== Variants ==
- HL-6 - prototype. One built
- HL-6A - similar to prototype but with more powerful engine. Five units were constructed in 1943.
- HL-6B Cauré - Similar to HL-6A but with more powerful engine 216 kW (290 hp) Lycoming O-290C, and optional enclosed cabin. 39 units were constructed in 1944.

== Specifications (HL-6B Cauré trainer) ==
Data from Jane's all the World's Aircraft 1947

General characteristics

- Crew: 2
- Length: 7.2 m (23 ft 7 in)
- Wingspan: 9.8 m (32 ft 2 in)
- Height: 2.04 m (6 ft 8 in)
- Wing area: 15 m^{2} (160 sq ft)
- Empty weight: 545 kg (1,202 lb)
- Gross weight: 750 kg (1,653 lb)
- Fuel capacity: 88 L (23 US gal; 19 imp gal)
- Powerplant: 1 × Lycoming O-290-C 4-cylinder air-cooled horizontally-opposed piston engine, 97 kW (130 hp) at 2,800 rpm for take-off
- Propellers: 2-bladed wooden fixed-pitch propeller

Performance

- Maximum speed: 200 km/h (120 mph, 110 kn)
- Cruise speed: 180 km/h (110 mph, 97 kn) 70% power
- Stall speed: 85 km/h (53 mph, 46 kn)
- Range: 520 km (320 mi, 280 nmi) (radius 260 km (160 mi; 140 nmi))
- Service ceiling: 4,500 m (14,800 ft) service ceiling
- Rate of climb: 4.5 m/s (890 ft/min)
- Time to altitude: 1,000 m (3,300 ft) in 4.2 minutes
- Wing loading: 50 kg/m^{2} (10 lb/sq ft)
- Power/mass: 8.046 kg/kW (13.23 lb/hp)
