= CNNA HL-14 =

HL-14

General information
- Type: Trainer
- National origin: Brazil
- Manufacturer: CNNA
- Number built: 1

The CNNA HL-14 was a civil trainer aircraft developed in Brazil during the 1940s at CNNA. It was a single-engine two-seat airplane. Only one prototype was constructed. It did not enter production.
