= Anésia Pinheiro Machado =

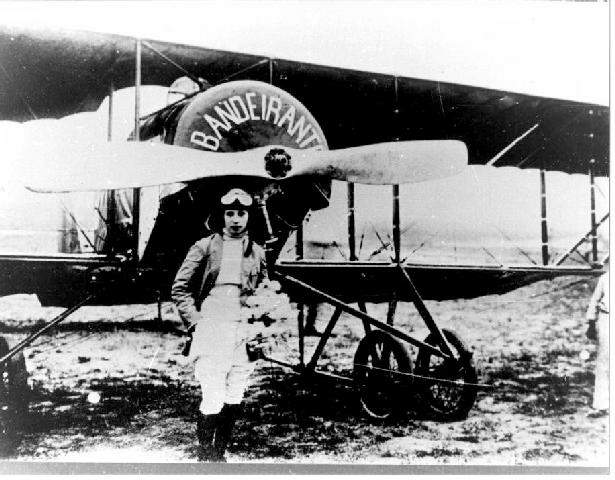
- Anésia Pinheiro Machado in 1922
- Born: June 1902 or 5 June 1904; Itapetininga, Brazil
- Died: 10 May 1999; Rio de Janeiro
- Occupations: pilot, aviation journalist

Anésia Pinheiro Machado (June 1902 or 5 June 1904, in Itapetininga – 10 May 1999) was the second licensed female pilot in Brazil (Teresa De Marzo being the first.) She made her first solo flight on March 17, 1922. In April 1922 she received Brevet No. 77 from the Fédération Aéronautique Internationale (FAI) by Aeroclube do Brasil.

== Biography ==
Machado was the first female pilot in Brazil to carry passengers, to become a journalist writing exclusively on matters of aviation, to make stunt flights, and to make a cross-country flight. She made the cross-country flight in 1922, and when she finished Santos Dumont gave her a gold medal, a replica of one given to him by Isabel de Bragança. Anesia kept it as a good luck charm.

In July 1943 she earned an American commercial pilot’s licence with additional ratings as instructor and for flying on instruments only.

In 1951 she flew with presidential greetings on a goodwill tour throughout the Americas. She was later quoted as saying, "The greatest satisfaction I believe I ever had was in 1951, when I delivered greetings to presidents in North, Central and South America. The then secretary general of the OAS, who is now President Lleras Camargo of Colombia, gave me the letters to deliver personally."

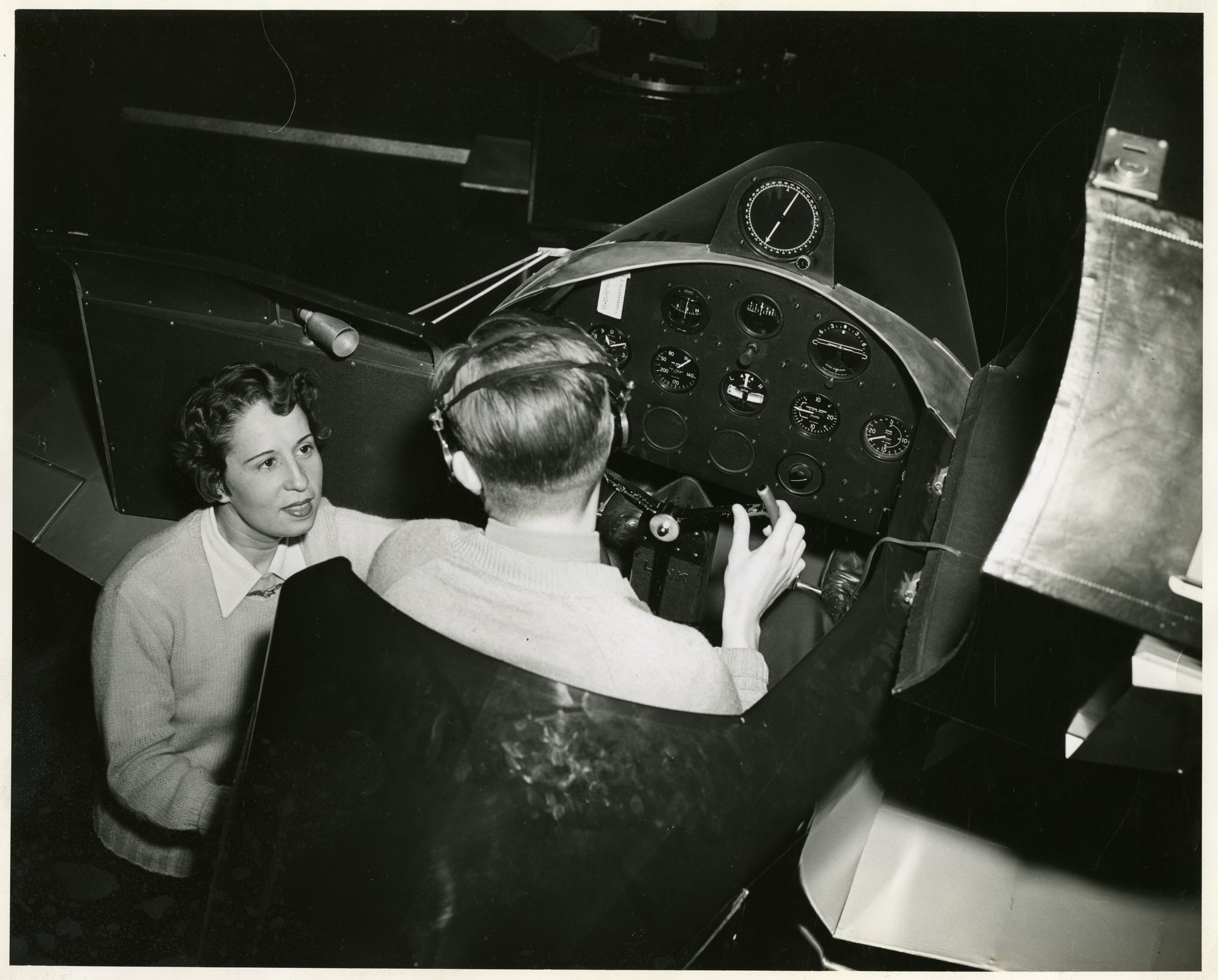
Anesia Pinheiro Machado (on left) and Pilot Dean E. Robinson.

In 1970 she was made an honorary citizen of Ne Missouri by Governor Warren Hearnes.

In 1989 she received the Edward Warner Award.

Due to her pioneering achievements in aviation, she was called the "Dean of all Women Pilots."

She was a member of the Ninety-Nines.
