= CNNA HL-2 =

HL-2

General information
- Type: Civil utility aircraft
- Manufacturer: CNNA
- Status: Cancelled project

The CNNA HL-2 was a utility aircraft designed in Brazil in 1940. It was a low-wing twin-engine monoplane intended to seat six people or for airmail use. Of wooden construction, an emphasis was placed on the use of native timbers to build the aircraft. Before the prototype was complete, however, the project was abandoned.
