= Antônio Muniz =

Brazilian aviation pioneer

Antônio Muniz Patron of the Brazilian Aviation Industry
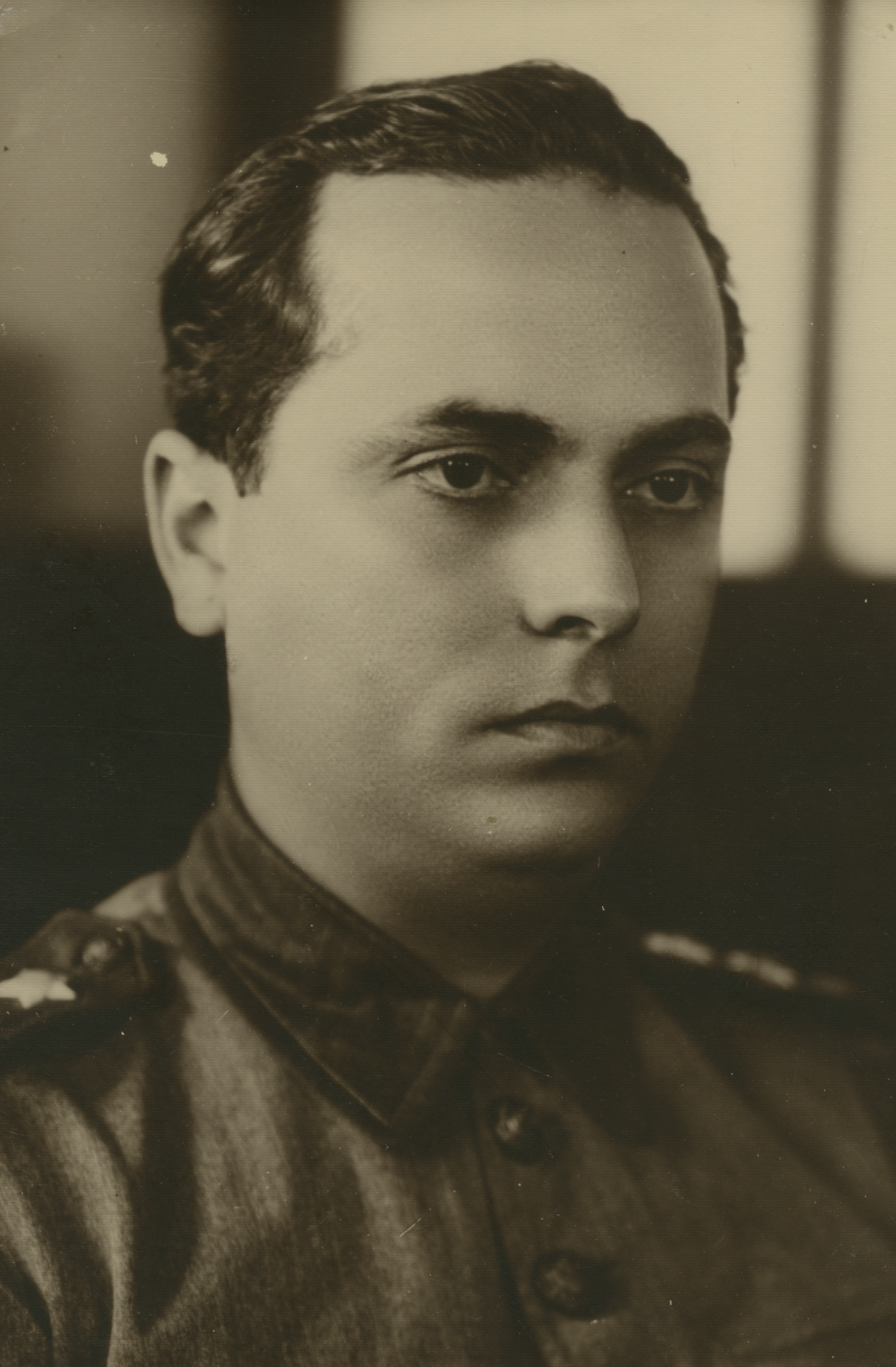
- Born: 12 June 1900; Maceió, Alagoas, Brazil
- Died: 28 June 1985 (aged 85)
- Education: Polytechnic School of Federal University of Rio de Janeiro
- Military career
- Allegiance: Brazil
- Branch: Brazilian Army; Brazilian Air Force
- Service years: 1921–1950
- Rank: Marechal-do-Ar

Antônio Guedes Muniz (12 June 1900 – 28 Jun 1985) was the pioneer of the Brazilian aviation industry.

== Early life and career ==
Muniz originally wanted to become a priest, which is why he initially attended a seminary, but changed his mind and transferred to the Anglo-Brazilian college in Rio de Janeiro. After college, starting in 1918, he attended the University of Rio de Janeiro, which he graduated from in January 1921 as an engineering candidate. He joined the Brazilian Army and did his service with the Companhia de Aviação da Arma de Engenharia, whose main mission was to maintain the Army Air Force Base and later the Air Force Base Campo dos Afonsos.

== Personal life ==
On January 13, 1923, he married Lucia da Rocha e Silva. In the same year, he organized the Military Meteorological Services and became its first director.

== Projects ==
In August 1925, he was sent to France to study aeronautical engineering at the École Supérieure de Aéronautique. During this time he developed several aircraft, which he named the M-1, M-2, M-3, M-4 and M-5. Only the Muniz M-5 was built by Caudron in 1929 with funds from the Federal government of Brazil and after successful test flights in France, was brought to Brazil. Upon his return to Brazil, he became director of the Técnicos da Aviação Militar and developed other aircraft, several of which were built and successful. During the 1st National Aeronautical Congress in 1934, Muniz proposed to produce airplanes domestically instead of always importing them. Eventually, the CNN was founded, which produced several of Muniz's designs.

== Gallery ==
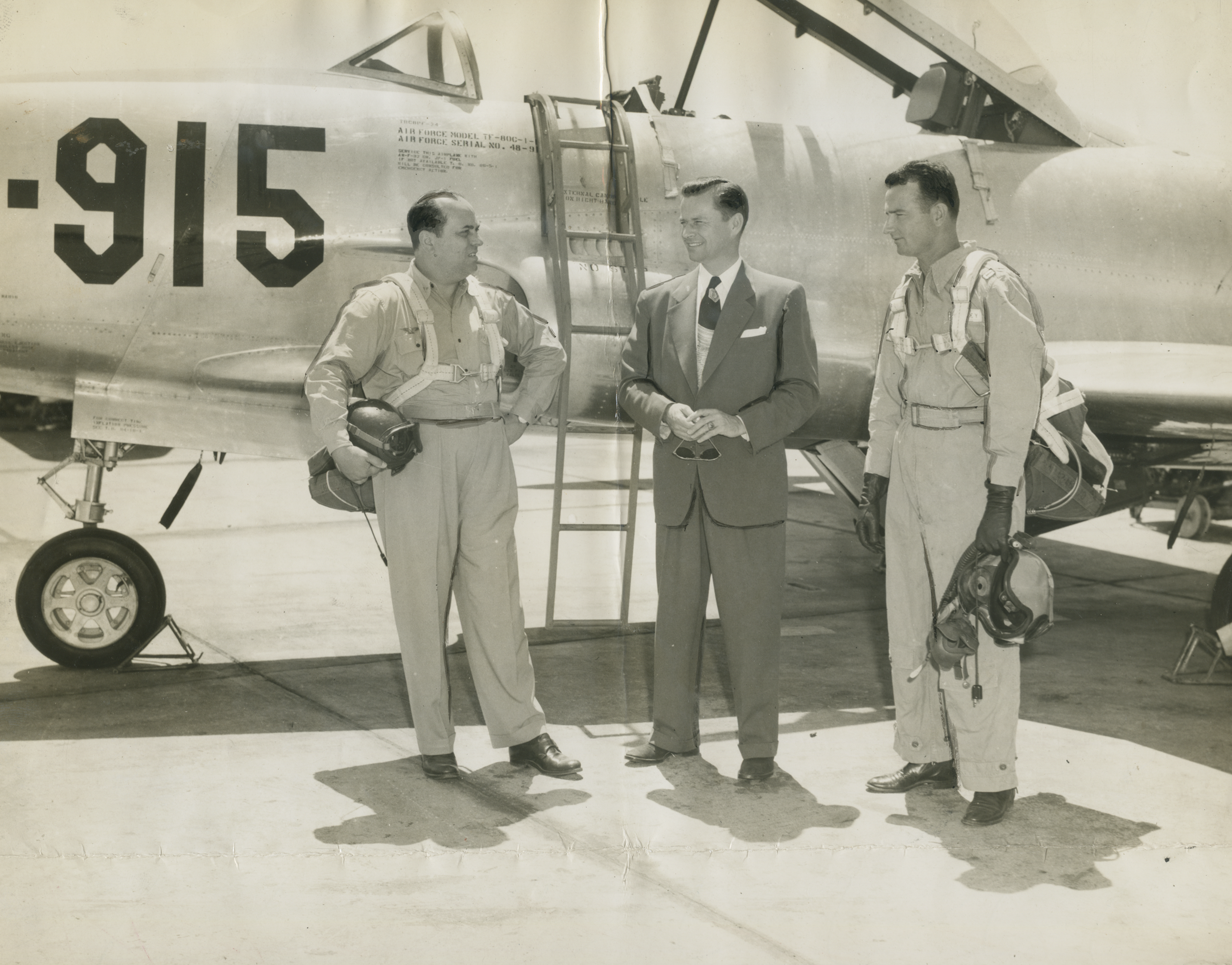
Antônio Muniz and Clyde Whaley stand in front of one Lockheed T-33 of the USAF (c.1949).

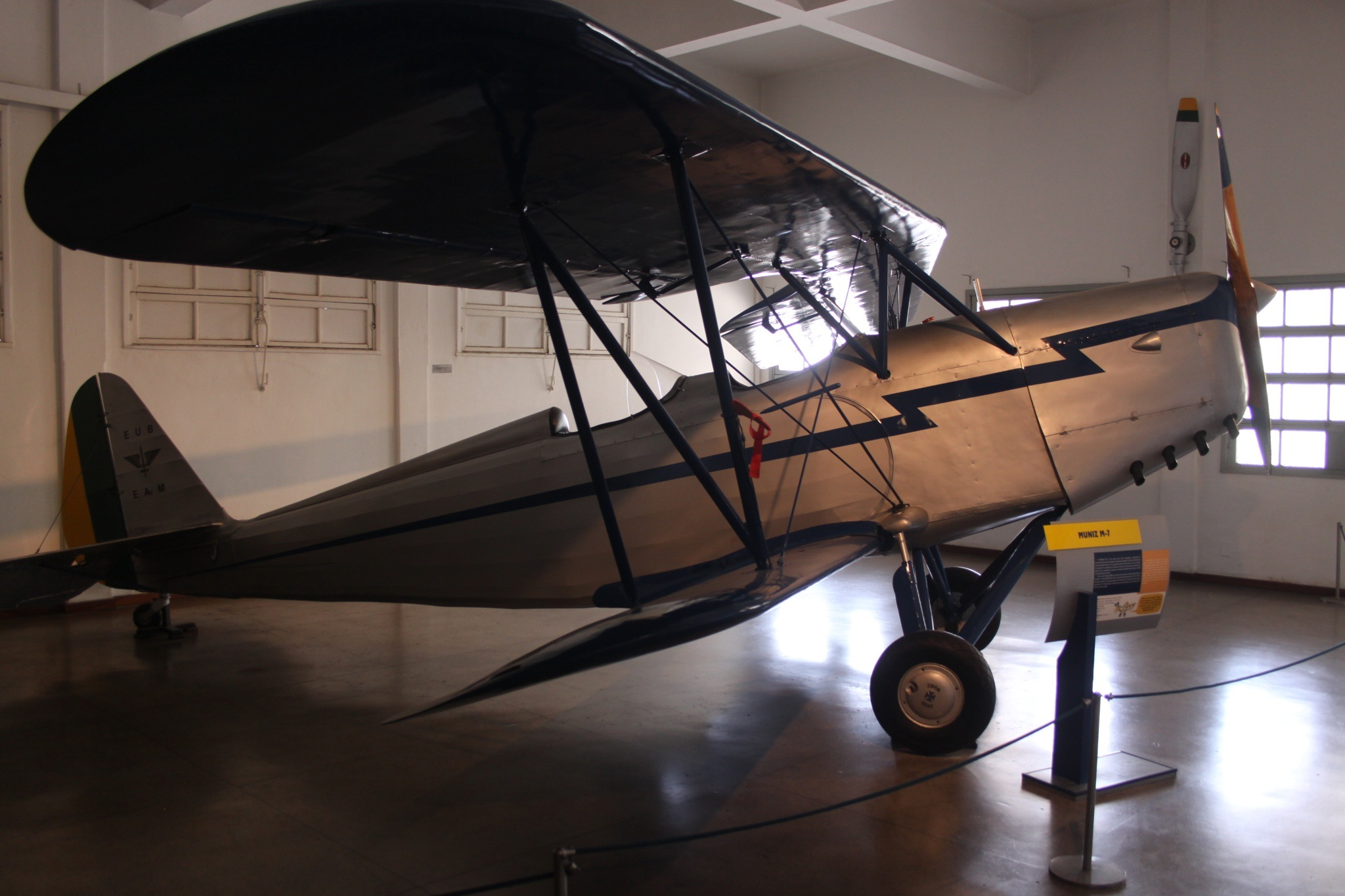
Muniz M-7 manufactured by Companhia Nacional de Navegação Aérea in the Museu Aeroespacial.

== Honours ==
- Grand Officer of the Order of Aeronautical Merit (10 December 1950)

== Bibliography ==
- INCAER (2008). Antonio Guedes Muniz, Pioneiro da Indústria Aeronáutica Arasileira, Patronos da INCAER. Rio de Janeiro: Brazilian Air Force.
- Volland, Marc (2011). Die Flugzeuge von Embraer: und anderer lateinamerikanischer Flugzeugbauer, ab 1945. Germany: BoD. ISBN 978-3-8423-0004-0.
- Bridgman, Leonard (1956). Jane's All The World's Aircraft 1956–57. New York: McGraw-Hill Book Company. ASIN B002A8AFD2.
