= Muniz M-9 =

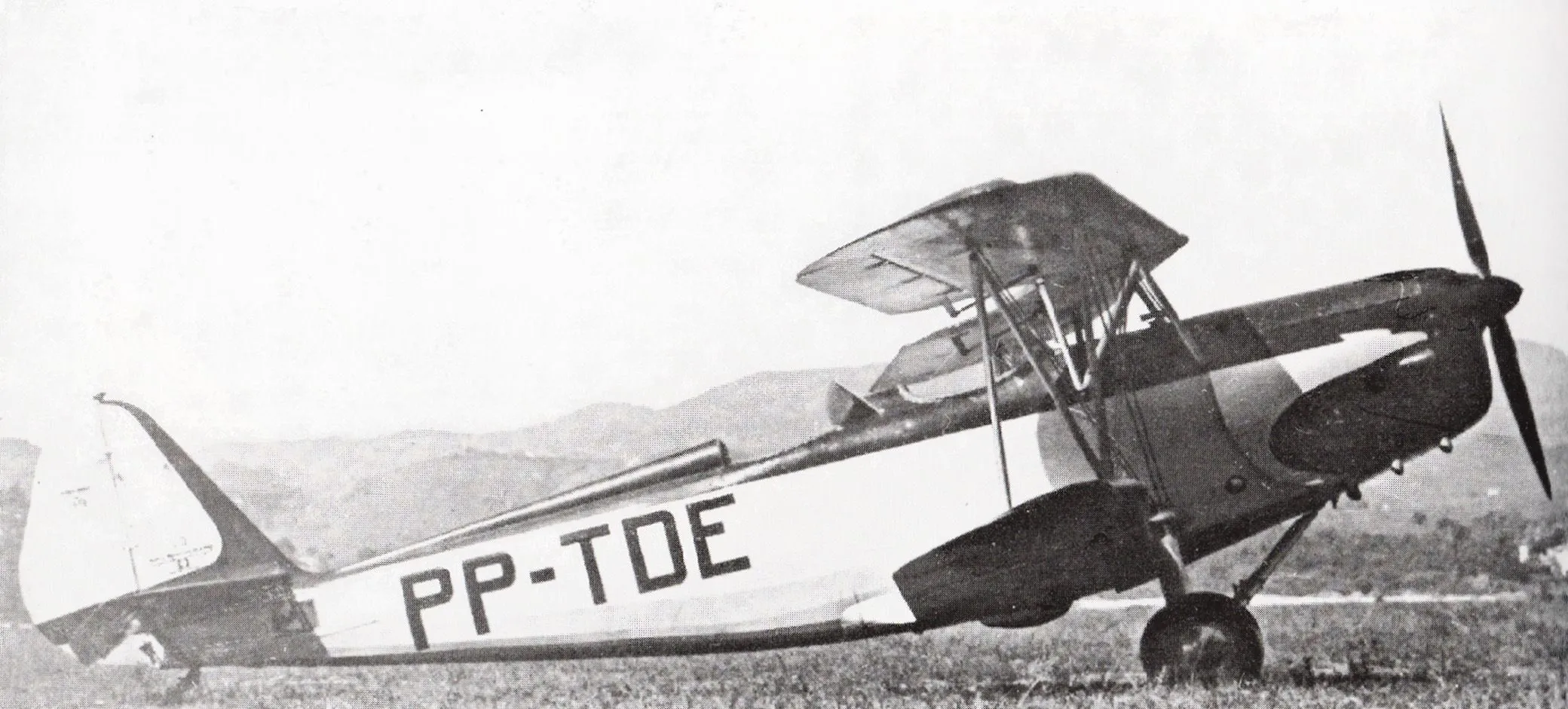
- M-9 at Afonsos Air Force Base, 1940.

General information
- Type: Primary trainer
- National origin: Brazil
- Manufacturer: Companhia Nacional de Navegação Aérea (CNNA)
- Designer: Antônio Muniz
- Primary user: Brazilian Air Force
- Number built: 56

History
- First flight: 1937

The Muniz M-9 was a two-seat training biplane with tandem open cockpit and powered by a 200 hp (149 kW) 130 hp (197 kW) de Havilland Gipsy Six engine. Designed by Lieutenant-Colonel Antônio Muniz, a serving officer in the Brazilian Air Force, as an advanced trainer and was a development of his earlier M-7 primary trainer. The flight of the first production aircraft was on 24 December, 1938, and an order for 20 aircraft was placed in 1939. 20 more aircraft were ordered in September 1940, but the de Havilland Gipsy Six engines were unavailable due to World War II. 190 HP Ranger L-440 6-440C-4 engines were substituted, resulting in delayed deliveries. The M-9 was used for training until 1952. It was also used in civilian aviation, with one plane famously used by Clóvis Gularte Candiota on 19 August, 1947 to spray for locusts which marked the beginning of Brazilian agricultural aviation.

== Operators ==
Brazil

- Brazilian Air Force

== Specifications (M-9) ==
Data from Jane's All the World's Aircraft 1938

General characteristics

- Crew: 2
- Length: 7.54 m (24 ft 9 in)
- Wingspan: 9.00 m (29 ft 6 in)
- Height: 3.10 m (10 ft 2 in)
- Wing area: 20.6 m^{2} (222 sq ft)
- Empty weight: 756 kg (1,667 lb)
- Gross weight: 1,076 kg (2,372 lb)
- Powerplant: 1 × de Havilland Gipsy Six , 150 kW (200 hp)

Performance

- Maximum speed: 225 km/h (140 mph, 121 kn)
- Cruise speed: 195 km/h (121 mph, 105 kn)
- Endurance: 4.1 hours
- Service ceiling: 5,800 m (19,000 ft) (Absolute ceiling: 6,600 m (21,700 ft)

== See also ==
Related development

- Muniz M-7

Related lists

- List of Interwar military aircraft
