= Muniz M-7 =

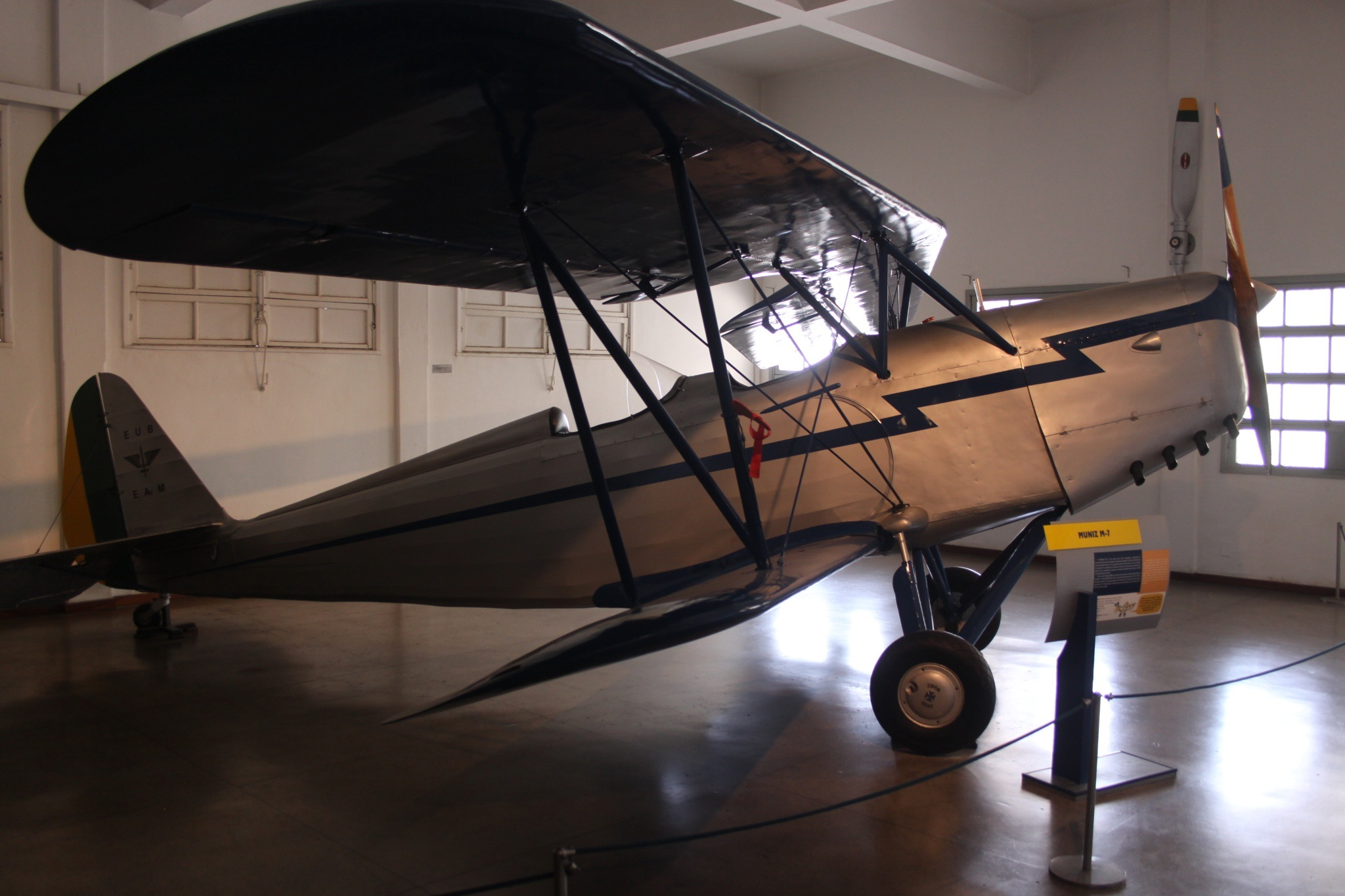

General information
- Type: Primary trainer
- National origin: Brazil
- Manufacturer: Companhia Nacional de Navegação Aérea (CNNA)
- Designer: Antônio Muniz
- Primary user: Brazilian Air Force
- Number built: 28

History
- First flight: 1935

The Muniz M-7 was a two-seat primary training biplane with tandem open cockpit and powered by a 130 hp (197 kW) de Havilland Gipsy Major engine. Designed by Lieutenant-Colonel Antonio Muniz, a serving officer in the Brazilian Air Force, as a primary trainer. It was the first production aircraft designed in Brazil. The M-7 prototype was built at the Central Aeronautics Park (Afonsos Air Force Base) and was first flown in October 1935. Production aircraft were built by Companhia Nacional de Navegação Aérea (CNNA) at Viana Island, (Rio de Janeiro). 11 aircraft were flown from 1937–1941 by the Military Aviation School based in Campo dos Afonsos, with the remaining 17 aircraft being sent to flying clubs.

== Operators ==
Brazil

- Brazilian Air Force

== Specifications (M-7) ==
Data from Jane's All the World's Aircraft 1938

General characteristics

- Crew: 2
- Length: 7.24 m (23 ft 9 in)
- Wingspan: 9.00 m (29 ft 6 in)
- Height: 2.85 m (9 ft 4 in)
- Wing area: 20.1 m^{2} (216 sq ft)
- Empty weight: 560 kg (1,235 lb)
- Gross weight: 860 kg (1,896 lb)
- Powerplant: 1 × de Havilland Gipsy Major , 97 kW (130 hp)

Performance

- Maximum speed: 190 km/h (120 mph, 100 kn)
- Cruise speed: 150 km/h (93 mph, 81 kn)
- Endurance: 5 hours
- Service ceiling: 4,000 m (13,100 ft) (absolute ceiling 5,200 m (17,100 ft))

== See also ==
Related development

- Muniz M-9

Related lists

- List of Interwar military aircraft
