= Teresa Di Marzo =

Pioneering Brazilian female aviator

Teresa De Marzo

Teresa Di Marzo (1903–1986) was a pioneering Brazilian aviator. In 1922, she became the first woman in Brazil to be granted a pilot's license.

== Biography ==
Born in São Paulo on 4 August 1903, Teresa Di Marzo was the daughter of Affonso Di Marzo and Maria Riparullo. In 1921, she trained as a pilot under the World War I pilot Fritz Roesler from Strasbourg. On 8 April 1922, after a test flight, she was granted license No. 76 from the Aeroclube do Brasil, becoming the first Brazilian women to receive an international flying certificate.

In 1923, together with Fritz Roesler, she opened the Ypiranga flying school but it was closed in 1924 as a result of the revolution.

She married Fritz Roesler on 26 September 1926 but never flew again as her husband would not pay for the aircraft fuel she needed.
