= Vietnam Mechanics Association VAM-1 =

Vietnamese ultralight aircraft

VAM-1

General information
- Type: Tandem-seat ultralight aircraft
- National origin: Vietnam
- Manufacturer: Vietnam Mechanics Association
- Status: Abandoned project

History
- First flight: 8 December 2005
- Developed from: Spectrum Beaver RX-550

The Vietnam Mechanics Association VAM-1 (VAM short for Vietnam Association Mechanics) is a Vietnamese ultralight aircraft developed by the Vietnam Mechanics Association in the 2000s. It is based on the Spectrum Beaver RX-550.

== Development and design ==
On 14 April 2003, Vietnamese Prime Minister Phan Văn Khải signed the 55/TB-VPCP–18/4/2003 official despatch, allowing the Vietnam Mechanics Association (Vietnamese: Hội Cơ học Việt Nam (Note: Also informally abbreviated as Hội Cơ học VN.)) to build a two-seat propeller-driven plane.

In 2003, Phạm Duy Long went to Canada to study piloting and light aircraft technology. With financial support from Overseas Vietnamese investors, construction of the prototype began in April 2003 under the leadership of Vimar Nguyễn and Nguyễn Văn Đạo. The VAM-1 was announced in August, the prototype completed in September, and the first flight being scheduled in the later months.

A Spectrum Beaver RX-550, registered as C-IBUN in Canada and owned by Vimar Nguyễn, formed the basis for the VAM-1. The VAM-1 has fixed tricycle landing gear. The flight controls are conventional and manual, and the ailerons are full-span. It has a boom-mounted tail section and sweptback leading edges. The structure is made of aluminium tubes. It is also fabric-covered. The experimented engine was a Rotax engine, which produced about 60 hp (45 kW). About 20% of the VAM-1, including the landing gear and controls, are modified to fit the conditions in Vietnam.

However, the aircraft did not receive any licences to fly, and the VAM-1 did not take off for a further two years. Nonetheless, the plane performed its first taxiing runs on 28 March 2004. On 8 December 2005, the VAM-1, with pilot Phạm Duy Long at the controls, took off for its maiden flight, with the aeroplane taking off and landing three times.

In 2006, Nguyễn Văn Đạo died following a traffic accident. Đạo's sudden death led to the project encountering several problems, and the project was eventually abandoned. The VAM project's largest supporter, former Prime Minister Võ Văn Kiệt, also died in 2008.

== Specifications ==
Data from Jackson, Paul; Munson, Kenneth; Peacock, Lindsay, eds. (2008). Jane's All the World's Aircraft 2008–2009 (99th ed.). Surrey: Jane's Information Group. p. 925. ISBN 978-0-7106-28374.

General characteristics

- Length: 6.30 m (20 ft 8 in)
- Wingspan: 9.75 m (32 ft 0 in)
- Height: 2.03 m (6 ft 8 in)
- Empty weight: 150 kg (330 lb)
- Max takeoff weight: 470 kg (1,035 lb)
- Powerplant: 1 × unspecified piston engine believed to be a Rotax 582 two-cylinder liquid-cooled engine, 48.0 kW (64.4 hp)
- Propellers: two-bladed

Performance

- Maximum speed: 132 km/h (82 mph, 71 kn)
- Service ceiling: 2,500 m (8,200 ft)
- Takeoff run: 70 m (230 ft)

== See also ==
- A41 Factory VNS-41
- Spectrum Beaver
