= A41 Factory VNS-41 =

2005 Vietnamese amphibious microlight

VNS-41
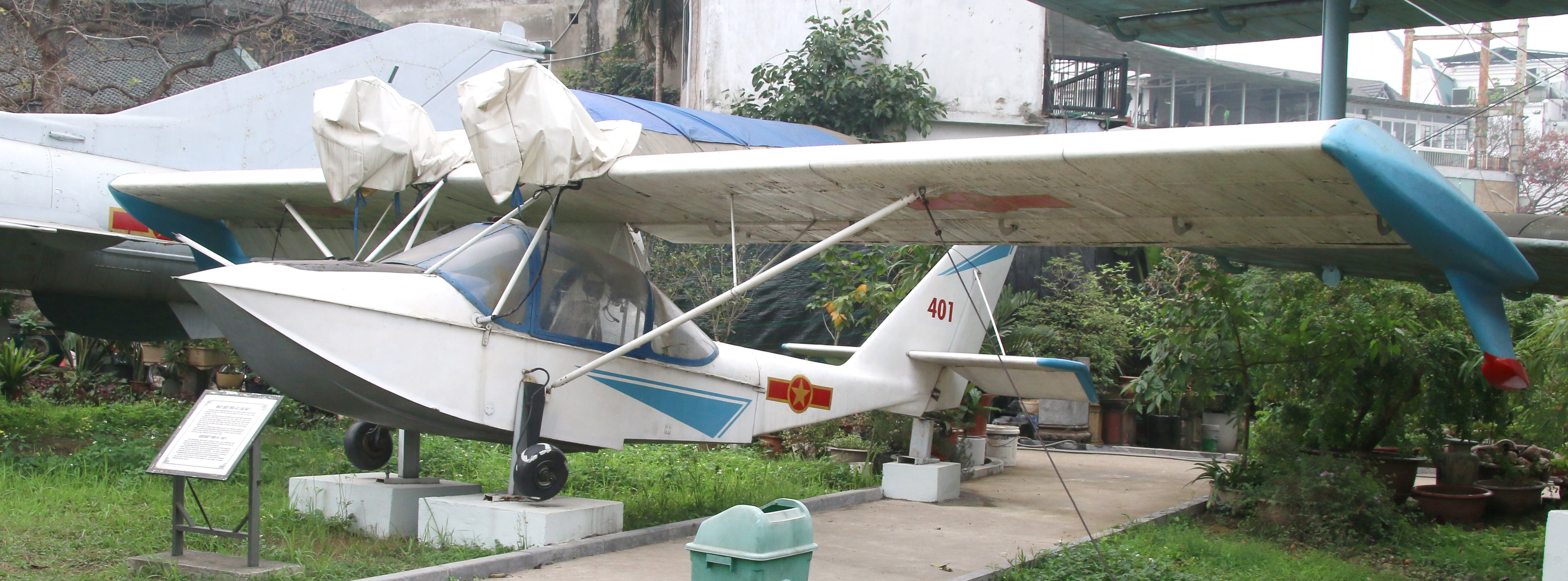
- VNS-41 at the Vietnam People's Air Force Museum

General information
- Type: amphibious microlight
- National origin: Vietnam
- Manufacturer: A41 Factory

History
- Manufactured: 2005–
- First flight: 12 September 2004

The VNS-41 is the first amphibious microlight aircraft made in Vietnam. The A41 Factory (officially Aircraft Repair Company A-41) under the Air Force and Air Defence Department (Ministry of Defence) manufactured the aircraft based on the Russian Che-22 Korvet design by Boris Chernov and E. Yungerov. A Che-22 was acquired by Vietnam in the late 1990s and from the Philippines. Technicians began developing the VNS-41 in June or July 2003. On 12 September 2004, the prototype performed its maiden flight with test pilot Nguyễn Duy Lê at the controls.

Fitted with two 65 hp Rotax 582 engines, the VNS-41 used the A92 fuel type, and each of its engines consumed about 19–22 litres per hour (5.0–5.8 gal/h; 19,000–22,000 cm^{3}/h). The VNS-41's hull, tail, and middle wing are made from high-quality composite material. On land, the aeroplane can take off after a 50–70 metres (160–230 ft) run. Meanwhile, the VNS-41 can take off on water after a 200–300 metres (660–980 ft) run. The cost of the aircraft is under two billion Vietnamese đồng.

The VNS-41 will initially be used in forestry patrol and agriculture but will also be marketed for sport, travel and commercial applications.

== Specifications ==
Data from https://repository.vnu.edu.vn/bitstream/VNU_123/96653/1/KY_02139.PDF, https://vnexpress.net/che-tao-thanh-cong-ba-chiec-thuy-phi-co-dau-tien-1997613.html, and https://vietnamembassy-usa.org/vi/node/3674

General characteristics

- Crew: one
- Capacity: three
- Length: 6.98 m (22 ft 11 in)
- Wingspan: 11.650 m (38 ft 3 in)
- Height: 2.535 m (8 ft 4 in)
- Wing area: 11.650 m^{2} (125.40 sq ft)
- Empty weight: 520 kg (1,146 lb)
- Max takeoff weight: 700 kg (1,543 lb)
- Fuel capacity: 80
- Powerplant: 2 × Rotax 582 two-stroke, two-cylinder, liquid-cooled, gear-reduction-drive piston engine, 48 kW (65 hp) each

Performance

- Maximum speed: 140–160 km/h (87–99 mph, 76–86 kn)
- Cruise speed: 120–135 km/h (75–84 mph, 65–73 kn)
- Range: 300 km (190 mi, 160 nmi)
- Service ceiling: 3,000 m (9,800 ft)

== See also ==
- Gidroplan Che-22 Korvet
- M-400 UAV
- Amphibious aircraft
- List of flying boats and floatplanes
