= Chernov Che-25 =

Che-25

General information
- Type: Four seat light amphibian aircraft
- National origin: Russia
- Designer: Boris Chernov

History
- First flight: 1995

The Chernov Che-25 is a four-seat, twin engine parasol wing amphibious flying boat built in Russia in the 1990s. The Che-27 is an enlarged, five seat version.

== Design and development ==
The Che-25 is very similar in general appearance to earlier Boris Chernov designs such as the two seat Korvet and the Chernov Che-23 but is a four-seat aircraft, with both span and length increased. It has an unswept, straight edged constant chord wing made from riveted duralumin, with a single spar. Lateral (roll) control is by full span flaperons and stability on the water is maintained by downturned fiberglass tips which act as simple floats. The parasol wing is braced by a single streamlined strut on each side to mid fuselage, assisted by jury struts, flying wires and a central section cabane. The twin engines are mounted above the wing leading edge. They can be either 47.8 kW (64 hp) Rotax 582 UL-2V air and water cooled, twin cylinder two strokes or 73.5 kW (99 hp) Rotax 912 ULS water cooled four stroke flat fours. The Rotax 582s are mounted uncowled and drive a two bladed propeller but the 912 installation is cowled, with three-bladed propellers.

The Che-25 has a flat sided, two step hull formed from a vacuum moulded fibreglass sandwich. The integral fin forms a cruciform tail with a swept, tapered, straight edged fin initially carried a balanced rudder, though the Che-25M variant with its higher tailplane abandoned the balance. The underwing cabin has dual controls and is entered via gull wing doors. There is a water rudder attached just aft of the rear step. The optional land undercarriage has mainwheels on mid-fuselage mounted legs, which rotate forward through 90° to allow water landings, and a tailwheel fixed to the water rudder.

The Che-25 was built by the student design bureau SKB-1 and first flew in 1995. It appeared in public in September 1996 at the Hydroaviasalon show in Gelendzhik. The Che-25M was displayed at the 1999 MAKS airshow, Moscow. Current production plans are not known.

== Variants ==
Data from Jane's All the World's Aircraft 2009-10

Che-25
Original version.
Che-25M
Raised tailplane, rudder balance removed.
BD-205
Chinese version of Che-25 marketed by the Harbin Institute of Technology.
Che-27
"Practically indistinguishable" from Che-25M with the same engine choices, weights and dimensions but 1.00 m (39.4 in) longer, a wider wheel track due to splayed undercarriage legs and five seats. First flown June 2003 and exhibited at the Moscow Aerosalon in August 2007.
State Avia SA-1
Che-27M2 marketed by State Avia.

== Specifications (Rotax 912) ==
Data from Jane's All the World's Aircraft 2009-10

General characteristics

- Capacity: Four
- Length: 7.70 m (25 ft 3 in)
- Wingspan: 12.60 m (41 ft 4 in)
- Height: 2.50 m (8 ft 2 in) land wheels, fuselage in flight position
- Wing area: 16.38 m^{2} (176.3 sq ft) gross
- Empty weight: 630 kg (1,389 lb)
- Max takeoff weight: 1,150 kg (2,535 lb)
- Fuel capacity: 130 L (28.6 Imp gal; 34.3 US gal)
- Powerplant: 2 × Rotax 912 ULS water-cooled flat four, 73.5 kW (98.6 hp) each
- Propellers: 3-bladed, 1.84 m (6 ft 0 in) diameter fixed pitch

Performance

- Maximum speed: 200 km/h (120 mph, 110 kn)
- Cruise speed: 160 km/h (99 mph, 86 kn) maximum
- Range: 900 km (560 mi, 490 nmi)
- Wing loading: 70.2 kg/m^{2} (14.4 lb/sq ft) maximum
- Power/mass: minimum, 83 W/m^{2} (0.051 lb/sq ft)
- Unstick speed: 70 km/h (44 mph; 38 kn)
- Take-off run on land: 80 m (262 ft)
- Take-off run on water: 60 m (197 ft)
