= Gidroplan Che-22 Korvet =

Che-22 Korvet
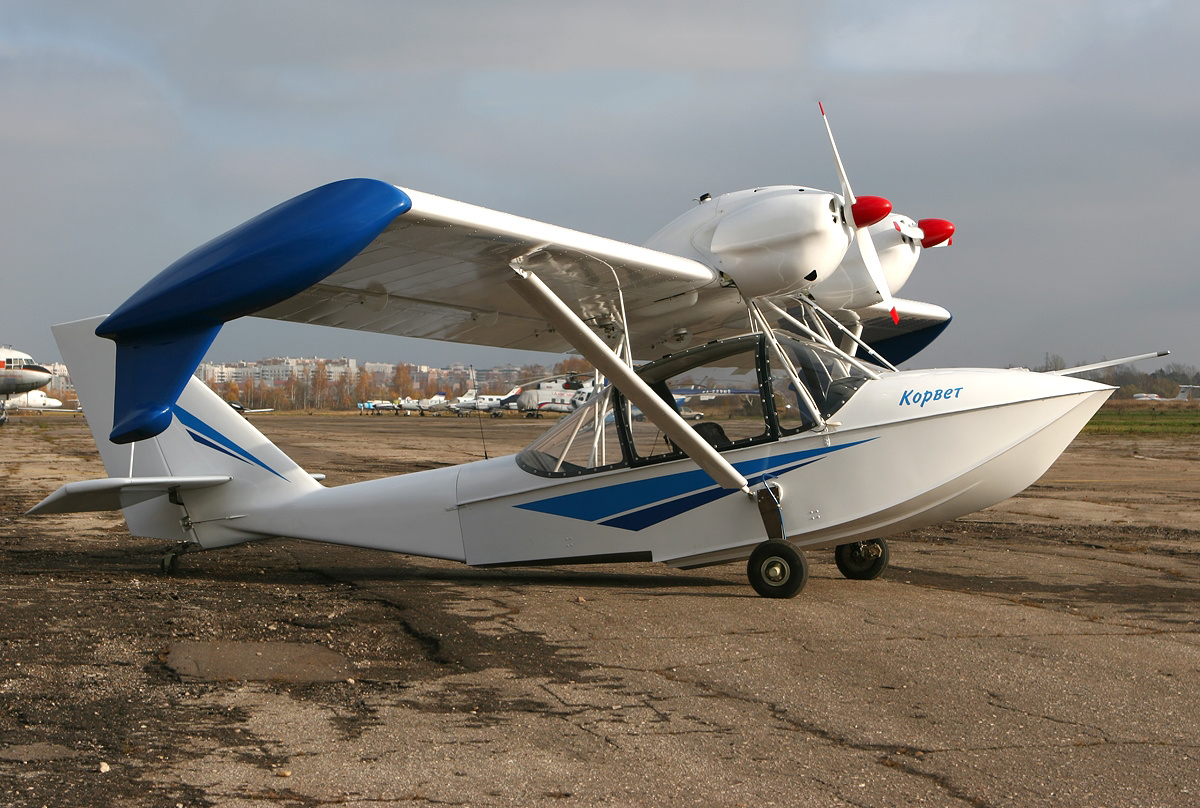

General information
- Type: Three seat light flying boat
- National origin: Russia
- Manufacturer: Gidroplan OOO (Hydroplane Ltd)
- Designer: Boris Chernov
- Number built: 80 by January 2011

History
- First flight: 1989
- Developed from: Chernov Che-20
- Variants: Chernov Che-23, Chernov Che-25

The Gidroplan Che-22 Korvet (English: Corvette) is a three-seat, parasol-wing flying boat designed and built in Russia in the 1990s. It can have one or two engines and may be configured as an amphibian. At least eighty have been produced.

== Design and development ==
The Korvet is one of several parasol wing light flying boats by Boris Chernov designs of similar appearance stemming immediately from the Che-20. The Che-22 Korvet made its first flight in 1993 and achieved certification in December 2001, with significant structural, control and instrumentation revisions made along the way. It proved successful, with 80 completed by January 2011. Since 1995, Chernov's designs have either been built by the Gidroplan (Hydroplane) Company or by Gidrosamolet.

The wing of the Korvet has no sweep and is of constant chord, with 1.5° dihedral; its thick airfoil section has a thickness-to-chord ratio of 0.15. It is a single spar, riveted duralumin covered structure, apart from its full span slotted flaperons, which are fabric covered, and Fiberglass sandwich, down turned, buoyant wing tips which support the wings when the aircraft is moored. Later aircraft have remodelled tips, which include integral miniature float bodies to provide stability at speed on the water; they may also have separate flaps and ailerons. The wing is braced to the mid-fuselage by a single streamlined strut on each side, with the assistance of jury struts. Cabane struts carry the wing over the cabin. The tail unit is a GFRP structure with a straight edged, tapered, swept fin and balanced rudder, which carries the unswept, straight edged tailplane, braced from above, a little above the upper fuselage line. The elevators are split by the rudder; the port surface has a trim tab.

Different variants of the Korvet have been fitted with several different engine types: some have a single engine, and some are twins. In all cases the engines are mounted over and above the wing leading edge. Twins have their engines as close together as the 1.5 m (59 in) propellers diameters will allow. Most engines have been from the Rotax range: the 37 kW (49.6 hp) Rotax 503 UL-2V and the 47.8 kW (64.1 hp) Rotax 582 UL two cylinder two strokes, the first air-cooled and the latter with mixed air and water cooling, and the 59.6 kW (79.9 hp) Rotax 912 UL water-cooled flat four. The 59.7 kW (80.1 hp) Jabiru 2200 has also been fitted. Some drive two blade propellers, though others have three blades.

The Korvet's fuselage is a flat sided, two step hull design, built from fibreglass. The cabin is completely enclosed in a blister canopy, which is all transparent apart from the underwing roof, giving all round views. Entry is by upward canopy sections on each side. The flying boat can be equipped as an amphibian with short spring cantilever legs with small mainwheels, the legs rotating through 90° for water touch-downs. There is a small tailwheel below the rudder. Skis are another option.

== Operational history ==
The first delivery of a Korvet was in 1990, when a pre-production aircraft went to a forest control organization. The first production aircraft flew in 1993, four years after the prototype. After receiving Russian certification at the end of 2001 and JAR/FAR certification a few months later, the Korvet sold quite well, with 60 built by the end of February 2002. An early Korvet 582 was sold in the Philippines, then bought by the Vietnamese and used as a model for the locally built A41 Factory VNS-41. Two Korvet-Js went to Cuba in military markings in 2008. Another Korvet-J was equipped for Earth resource survey with large underwing aerials, and after successful trials these aerials were internally accommodated. By January 2011, eighty had been sold, the most recent to Costa Rica. Of the eighty built, seventeen were Jabiru powered.

As well as selling flyaway aircraft, Gidroplan also sell kits in different stages of finish.

== Variants ==
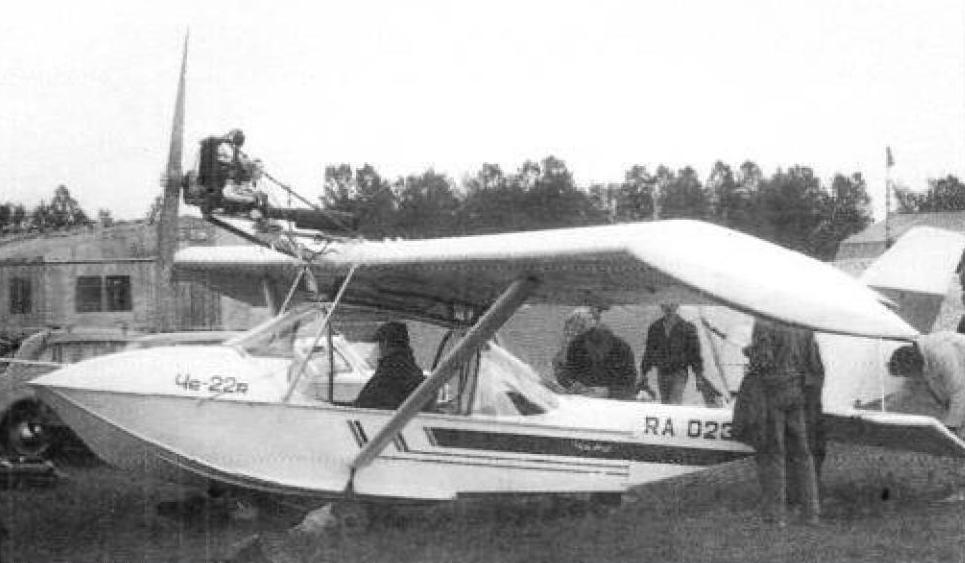
Che-22 during development

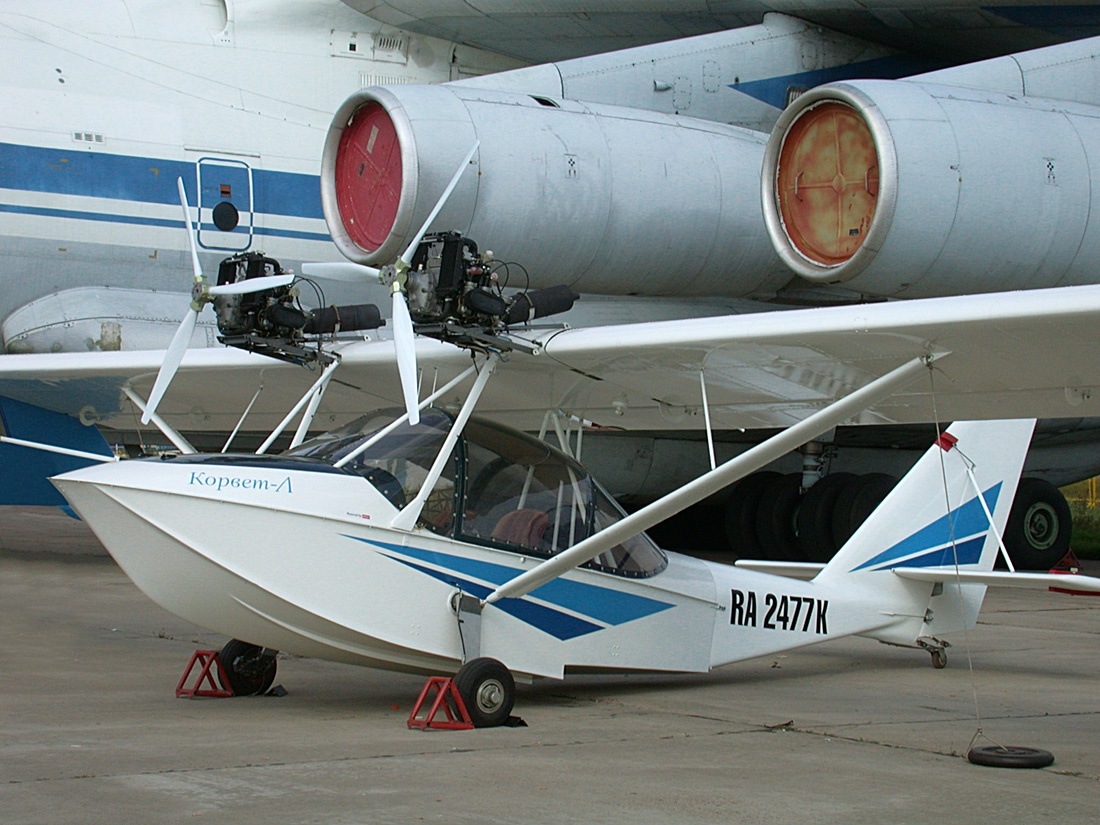
Korvet-L

Data from Jane's All the World's Aircraft 2009-10 and 2013-14

Che-22P1
One Rotax 582.
Korvet 503 (Che-22P2)
Two Rotax 503 UL. Discontinued by 2013.
Korvet 582 (Che-22RS)
Two Rotax 582 UL. Precursor to the Korvet-L.
Korvet 912 (Che-22D)
One Rotax 912 UL. Discontinued by 2013.
Korvet-J
Two Jabiru 2200. Tip floats as Korvet-L. Flown by 2003.
Korvet-L (Che-22RS)
Two Rotax 582 UL. Static buoyant tips revised to include miniature hydrodynamic float extensions. Flown by 2003.
Korvet single
One Jabiru 2200 with three blade propeller. Flown by 2008.
Korvet Kabriolet
Open cockpit version, under development in 2010; probably one Jabiru 2200.
Refly Pelican
Appeared at Oshkosh 2000, but not authorised by Gidroplane. Two Rotax 582 UL.
Chernov Che-23
Two seat version, 75 mm (3.0 in) shorter and 170 kg (375 lb) lighter empty than the similarly powered Korvet 912. Raised tailplane; combined tailwheel and water rudder just aft of rear step. One Rotax 582 UL or 912 UL; three blade propeller.

== Specifications (Korvet-L) ==
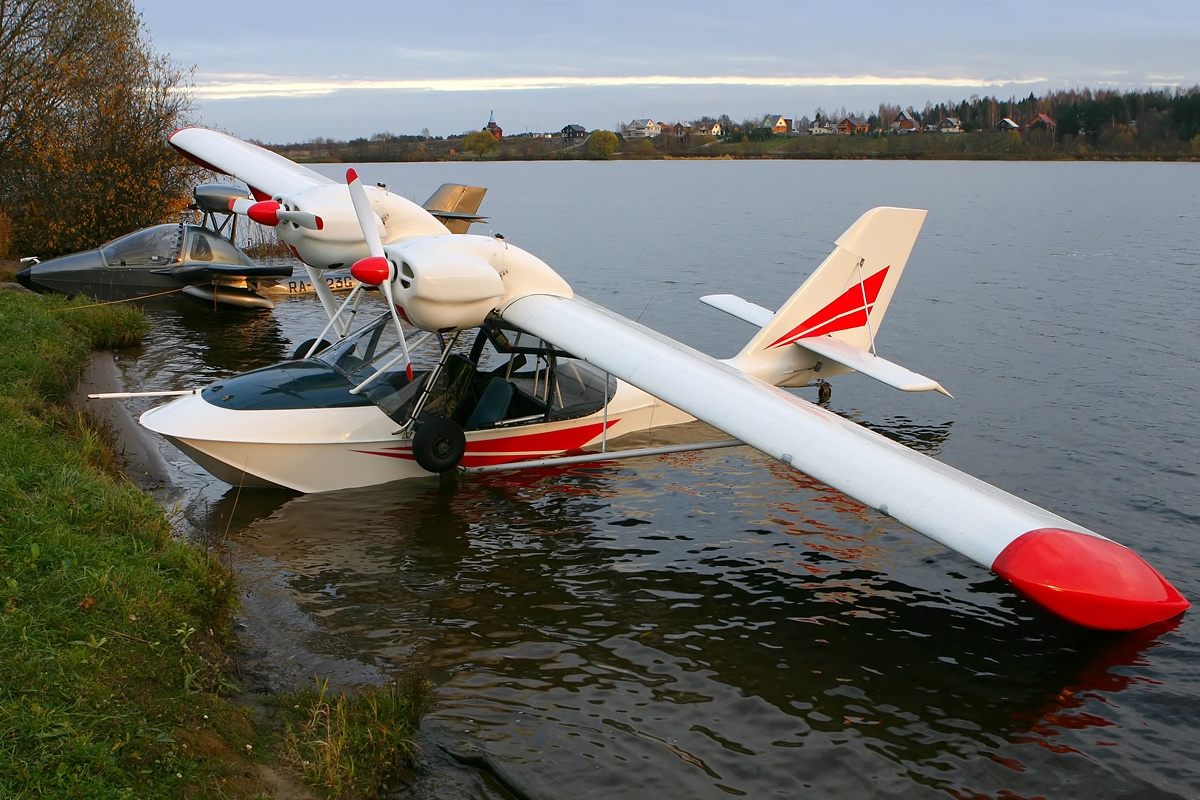

Data from Jane's All the World's Aircraft 2009-10 and 2013-14

General characteristics

- Crew: One
- Capacity: Two passengers
- Length: 7.25 m (23 ft 9 in)
- Wingspan: 10.53 m (34 ft 7 in)
- Height: 2.40 m (7 ft 10 in)
- Wing area: 16.40 m^{2} (176.5 sq ft) gross
- Airfoil: TsAGI P-IIIA
- Max takeoff weight: 675 kg (1,488 lb)
- Fuel capacity: 100 L (22.0 Imp gal; 26.4 US gal) standard; optional enlarged tanks 130 L (28.6 Imp gal; 34.3 US gal); fuel weight 58 kg (127 lb).
- Powerplant: 2 × Rotax 582 UL flat-four liquid and air cooled, 47.8 kW (64.1 hp) each
- Propellers: 2-bladed, 1.50 m (4 ft 11 in) diameter fixed pitch

Performance

- Maximum speed: 159 km/h (99 mph, 86 kn)
- Cruise speed: 130 km/h (81 mph, 70 kn)
- Range: 450 km (280 mi, 240 nmi)
- Service ceiling: 3,000 m (9,800 ft) service
- g limits: +3.8/-1.5
- Rate of climb: 7.0 m/s (1,380 ft/min)
- Take-off run on land: 80 m (262 ft)
- Take-off run on water: 90 m (295 ft)
