= ITAD M-400 =

M-400 UAV
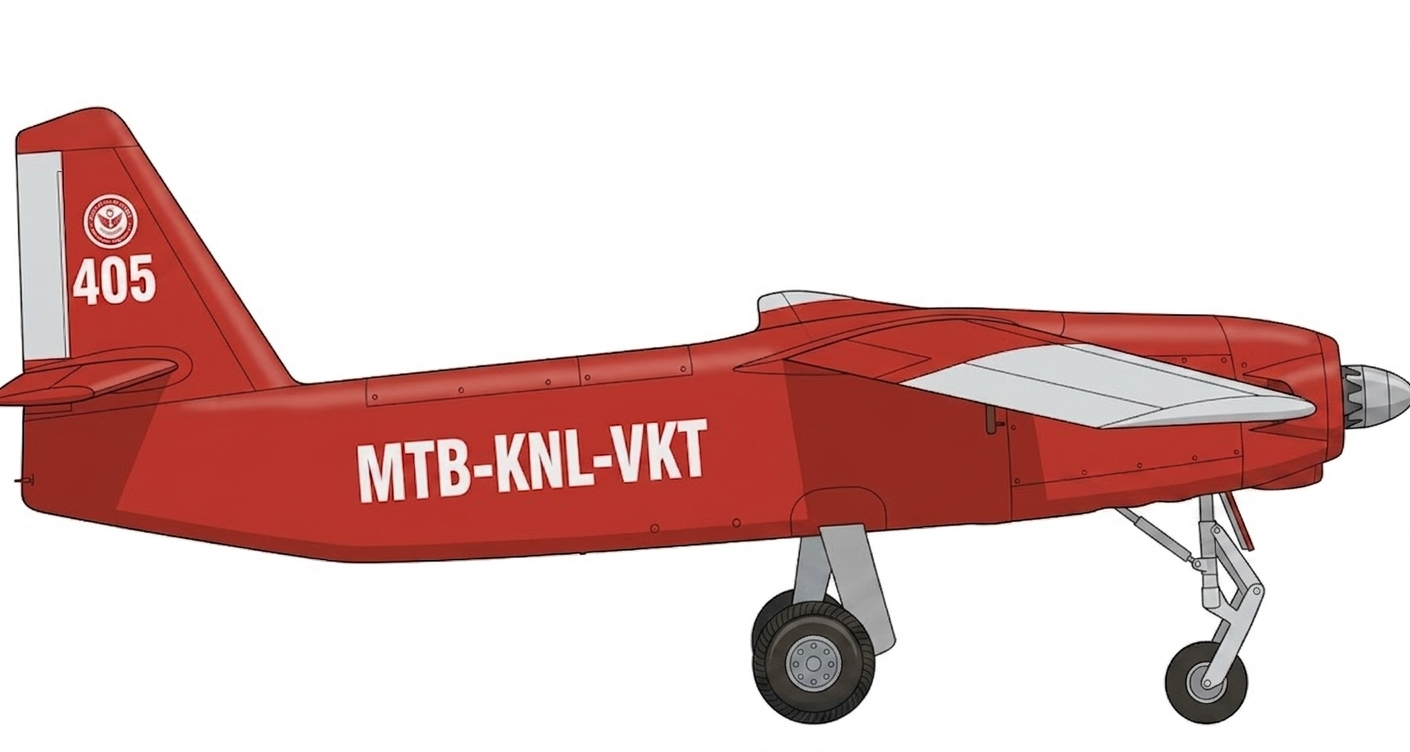
- M400-CT reconnaissance UAV
- Type: unmanned aerial vehicle
- Place of origin: Vietnam

Service history
- In service: 2005
- Used by: Vietnam

Production history
- Designed: 2001
- Produced: 2005

M-400 UAV was an experimental reconnaissance unmanned aerial vehicle was designed and built by the Institute of Technology Air Defense by the Vietnamese Ministry of Defense. Two M400-CT models UAVs were successfully launched on 15 September 2005 after four years of construction and research.

The UAV appears to be a small model type propeller driven aircraft. The UAV never entered full service in the Vietnamese People's Air Force (plans were to have twelve built) and is no longer in service due to lack of GPS to guide the craft and other critical components.

== See also ==
- IAI Scout
