= List of gliders (I) =

This is a list of gliders/sailplanes of the world, (this reference lists all gliders with references, where available) Note: Any aircraft can glide for a short time, but gliders are designed to glide for longer.

== I ==
=== IA ===
  - Ae, for "Dirección General de Aerotécnica", on the first period (1927–1936);
  - F.M.A., for "Fábrica Militar de Aviones", on the second period (1938–1943);
  - I.Ae., for "Instituto Aerotécnico", on the third period (1943–1952);
  - IA, meaning not specified, on the fourth (current) period (1952 to 2007).
- IA.54 Cóndor Andino
- IA.54 Carancho
- IA AX-2

=== I.Ae. ===
  - Ae, for "Dirección General de Aerotécnica", on the first period (1927–1936);
  - F.M.A., for "Fábrica Militar de Aviones", on the second period (1938–1943);
  - I.Ae., for "Instituto Aerotécnico", on the third period (1943–1952);
  - IA, meaning not specified, on the fourth (current) period (1952 to 2007).
- I.Ae 25 Mañque
- I.Ae 33
- I.Ae 34 Clen Antú
- I.Ae 34M
- I.Ae 37G research scale glider
- I.Ae 37P research scale glider/ powered glider
- I.Ae 41 Urubu
- I.Ae 41B
- I.Ae 49
- I.Ae 54 Carancho
- I.Ae 56 Standard
- I.Ae 58 Pucarà research scale glider
- Horten XVI Colibri
- Piernifero

=== IAR ===
(Industria Aeronautică Română) see:ICA-Brasov

=== ICA-Brasov ===
(Întreprinderea de Construcții Aeronautice) cf. URMV-3, ILL

- ICA IS-28
- ICA IS-28M
- ICA IS-29
- ICA IS-30
- ICA IS-31
- ICA IS-32
- ICA IS-33
- IAR-35

=== I.C.A.R. ===
(Întreprinderea de construcții aeronautice romȃnești")

- ICAR 1

=== IFIL ===
(Întreprinderea Forestierǎ de Industrializare a Lemnului)

- IFIL RM-1 – (Vladimiir Nowițchi)
- IFIL RG-1
- IFIL RG-2 – (Vladimiir Nowițchi)
- IFIL RG-3 – (Vladimiir Nowițchi)
- IFIL-Reghin RG-4 Pionier
- IFIL RG-5 Pescăruș
- IFIL RG-9 Albatros

=== Iggulden ===
(William Palmer Iggulden & Jack Iggulden)

- Iggulden Bluebird
- Iggulden Tandem 1929
- Iggulden Termagent 3

=== IIL ===
(Întreprinderea de Industrie Locală- Ghimbav) cf. URMV-3, ICA-Brasov

- IIL IS-4
- IIL IS-5
- IIL IS-7
- IIL IS-8
- IIL IS-9
- IIL IS-10
- IIL IS-11
- IIL IS-12
- IIL IS-13
- IIL IS-18 – Iosif Șilimon
- IIL IS-18/25 – Iosif Șilimon

=== Ikarus ===
(Ikarus Prva srpska industrija aeroplana, automobila i strojeva)

- Ikarus Meteor
- Ikarus Košava
- Ikarus B.C.6 Kobac
- Ikarus Košava – built by Ikarus Avijaticarski
- Ikarus Košava II – built by Ikarus Avijaticarski
- Ikarus Kosava 57
- Ikarus Kosava 60
- Ikarus Mačka
- Ikarus Meteor 57
- Ikarus Meteor 60
- Ikarus Munja
- Ikarus Orao I
- Ikarus Orao II "Kico"/ IIb/ IIc
- Ikarus P-453 M-W
- Ikarus 920 Desant
- Ikarus 920M

=== IKV ===
(Ilmailukerho Vasama)

- IKV-3 Kotka

=== Ilić ===
(Milos Ilić / Savezni Vazduhoplovni Centar, Vršac)

- Ilić KBI-14 Mačka
- Ilić Ilindenka

=== Ilyushin ===
(Sergei Vladimirovich Ilyushin / OKB Ilyushin)

- Ilyushin Il-32
- Ilyushin Mastyazhart

=== IMPA ===
(IMPA - Industrias Metalúrgicas y Plasticas Argentinas S.A. ),

- IMPA P-38

=== INAV ===
(Instituto Argentino de Vuelo a Vela)

- INAV 1

=== Inteco ===
Velkomaravska, Czech Republic

- Inteco L-213A

=== Isle of Wight gliding club ===
- IOW Club glider

=== IPD ===
(Instituto de Pesquisas e Desenvolvimento)

- IPD Urupema
- IPD Urubu – (PAR PE-80367)

=== IPE ===
(Industria Paranaense de Estruturas)

- IPE Quero Quero
- IPE Nhapecan-1
- IPE Nhapecan-2
- IPE 02 Nhapecan
- IPE 03
- IPE 04
- IPE 05 Quero Quero II
- IPE 08

=== IPT ===
(Instituto de Pesquisas Technologicas de Sao Paulo)

- IPT-01 Gafanhoto
- IPT-02 Aratinga
- IPT-03 Saracura
- IPT-05 Jaraguá
- IPT-06 Stratus
- IPT-12 Caboré
- IPT-14
- IPT-15
- IPT-17

=== IS ===
(Instytut Szybownictwa – gliding institute) – post World War II

- IS-A Salamandra – Salamander
- IS-B Komar – Gnat
- IS-C Zuraw – Crane
- IS-1 Sęp
- IS-2 Mucha – Fly
- IS-3 ABC
- IS-4 Jastrząb – Hawk
- IS-5 Kaczka – Duck

=== IS ===
(Iosif Șilimon - Romanian constructor / designer) See:- IIL and URMV-3

=== Isaac ===
(A. C. T. Isaac)

- Isaac 1910 glider (2 x hang glider)
- Isaac 1923 glider (2-seat Primary)
- Isaac 1929 glider (primary)
- Isaac 1932 glider (A BAC VII, built from a kit)
- Isaac biplane glider

=== ISF ===
(Ingenieur-Büro Strauber-Frommholf)

- Strauber-Frommholf Mistral
- ISF Mistral-C

=== Issoire ===
- Issoire D77 Iris
- Issoire E78 Silene
- Issoire PIK-20
- Issoire PIK-30

=== IST ===
(Philippines Institute of Science and Technology / Antonio J. de leon)

- IST L-10 Balang

=== ITA ===
(Instituto Tecnológico de Aeronáutica de São José dos Campos)

- ITA Urupema

=== Itoh ===
(Itoh Hikoki Aviation / Yamasaki Yoshio)

- Itoh D-1
- Itoh C-6

=== ITS ===
(Instytut Techniki Szybownictwa – gliding technical institute)- pre World War II

- ITS Jaskółka – Swallow. Low-wing aircraft. Drive: in-line engine. Seating arrangement: tandem. A mock-up for wind tunnel tests was created. Very good aerodynamic properties.
- ITS Wróbel – Sparrow
- ITS-II
- ITS-IVB
- ITS-7 Drozd – Thrush
- ITS-8 – ing. Wiesław Stępniewski ( preliminary project ), ing. Boleslaw Wiśnicki ( idea: double bar system ). Then a project team was created at ITS, which included: ing. F. Kotowski, ing. Bolesław Wiśnicki, ing. Józef Niespał, ing. Marian Piątek, ing. Rudolf Wojciech Matz.

=== Ittner ===
(E. Ittner / Nordbayr. Luftfahrtverband, Nürnberg)

- Nürnberg D-14 Doppeldecker
