= List of Yugoslavian gliders =

This is a list of gliders/sailplanes of the world, (this reference lists all gliders with references, where available) Note: Any aircraft can glide for a short time, but gliders are designed to glide for longer.

== Yugoslavian miscellaneous constructors ==
- AAK Pionir IIa
- AK Zagreb Borongaj
- Albatros Vrabac A
- Cancarevic
- Cavka (glider)
- Cener-Slanovec KB-2 Udarnik Dušan Cener & Marjan Slanovec
- Delfin (glider)
- Delfin M-2
- Delfin M-3
- Detter zmaj
- Djurin Komarac I (ustvari motorizovana Cavka-motorized Cavka glider)
- DRAGOVIĆ Jastreb Vuk-T DRAGOVIĆ, Tomislav
- FAJ Jastreb (VTC-76) Vuk-T
- Fizir-Mikl
- Glisa Stanisavljevic GS-1
- Hosszú-Tišma 1923 Triplane István HOSSZÚ & Vladimir TIŠM
- Hrisafovic HS-62 Cirus HRISAFOVIC Nenad
- Hrisafovic HS-64 HRISAFOVIC Nenad
- Ilindenka 1 - designed by Miloš Ilić, built by 20. Maj
- Ilindenka 1T - designed by Miloš Ilić, built by 20. Maj
- Ilindenka 2 - designed by Miloš Ilić, built by 20. Maj
- SVC Mačka - Miloš Ilić
- ILZS
- Jastreb bis
- Jastreb 54
- Klobučar 1911 glider KLOBUČAR, Viktor
- Kokot Pisece
- Kuhelj Inka I/ Ia/ II
- Libis KB-17 Kondor
- Libis KB-18
- Ilić KBI-14 Mačka – built by Savezni Vazduhoplovni Centar, Vršac
- Musa SO-2 – Obad Stanko
- Obad O.S.-3 Musa Kesedzija
- Prva petoletka Roda
- Soko SL-40 Liska – Sour Vazduhoplovna Industrija Soko, Radna Organizacija Vazduhoplovstvo Mostar
- Šoštarić Vrabac
- Sova (motor-glider)
- Trener (glider)
- Varoga-Pockaj
- VG-151
- VTRZ Jastreb H-49 Split
- VUK-T – Prof. Dr. Tomislav Dragović at the Faculty of Mechanical Engineering, Aero Engineering Institute, University of Belgrade
- VZ Jastreb Novi Sad Roda
