= List of gliders (V) =

This is a list of gliders/sailplanes of the world, (this reference lists most gliders with references, where available) Note: Any aircraft can glide for a short time, but gliders are designed to glide for longer.

== V ==
=== Váhala-Pleško ===
(Hubert Váhala & Štefan Pleško / Dílny PO MLL Sodomka, Vysoké Mýto, Pardubice, Bohemia)

- Váhala-Pleško VP-1 Jánošík

=== Váhaly-Sands ===
(H. Váhaly & S. Sands)

- Váhaly-Sands Jánošík

=== Vakhmistrov-Tikhonravov ===
(V. Vakhmistrov & M. Tikhonravov)

- Vakhmistrov-Tikhonravov Dragon

=== Valentin ===
(Valentin Flugzeugbau GmbH / Valentin GmbH Geräte und Maschinebau)

- Valentin Kiwi
- Valentin Taifun
- Valentin Mistral-C

=== Valette ===
(Aimé Valette)

- Valette 1922 glider

=== Valk ===
(Solomon Fedorovitch Valk / Nikitin)

- Valk IOS
- Valk IOS-2

=== Valmiera Aviation Festival ===
- Valmierietis glider

=== van Dusen ===
(William van Dusen)

- van Dusen amphibian glidersic

=== Vanags ===
(Latvia)

- Vanags (glider)

=== Varoga-Počkaj ===
(Aleš Varoga - Duša Počkaj)

- Varoga-Počkaj glider

=== Vasquez (glider constructor) ===
- Vásquez Pampero

=== Vaughn ===
(Horace Vaughn)

- Vaughan 1909 glider

=== Vaysse ===
(Pierre Vaysse)

- Vaysse TCV-01 Trucavaysse
- Vaysse TCV-02 Trucavaysse
- Vaysse TCV-03 Trucavaysse
- Vaysse GEP-10 Trucavaysse
- Vaysse Trapanelle

=== VEF ===
(Eizens Delle / Valsts Elektrotehniskā Fabrika - State Electrotechnical Factory)

- VEF-1

=== Vekchine ===
(G. D. Vekchine)

- Vekchine 1910 glider

=== Verrimst-Maneyrol ===
(Robert Verrimst & Alexis Maneyrol)

- Verrimst-Maneyrol 1922 glider

=== Vetterli ===
(Ernst Vetterli)

- Vetterli Sperber

=== VFW-Fokker ===
(VFW-Fokker GmbH)

- VFW-Fokker FK-3
- VFW-Fokker Sirius

=== VG (glider constructor) ===
- VG-151

=== Viana (glider constructor) ===
- Viana (glider)

=== Viesturs (glider constructor) ===
- Viesturs (glider)

=== Vila ===
(Eliseo Vila)

- Vila Mainene 1

=== Villacampa-Hospital-Pérez-Panzano ===
(Vicente de Antonio Villacampa & José María Hospital & Jaime Julve Pérez & Antonio Panzano / Escuela de Aeromodelisme, Alerre)

- Aeropijolo

=== Vine ===
(S.W. Vine, Krugersdorp, Traansval)

- Vine 1930 glider

=== Vinklar ===
(Karel VINKLAR & Josef ŠVÉBIŠ)

- Vinklar Polydor

=== Vlaicu ===
(Aurel Vlaicu)

- Vlaicu 1909 glider

=== VMA ===
- VMA-200 Milan – Victor Minié Aéronautique, Saint-Cyr (DFS Weihe)
- VMA AIR 102

=== Voepel ===
- Voepel Schulgleiter tailless primary

=== Vogt ===
- Vogt Lo-100
- Vogt Lo-105 Zwergreiher – Dwarf Heron
- Vogt Lo-150 Bergfalke – Mountain Falcon
- Vogt Lo-170

=== Voisin ===
(Appareils d'Aviation Les Frères Voisin - Gabriel Voisin & Charles Voisin)

- Voisin LV-104

=== Voříšek ===
(Jaroslav Voříšek)

- Voříšek Sup

=== VSM ===
(Ladislav Smerček / Vývojová Skupina Morava)

- VSM-40 Démant

=== VSR Musachevo ===
(Panov & Panchovsky)

- VSR Musachevo Jastreb

=== VTRZ Jastreb ===
- VTRZ Jastreb H-49 Split
- VTRZ Jastreb Roda

=== Vuillemenot ===
(Roger Vuillemenot)

- Vuillemenot AE-11
- Vuillemenot AE-12
- Vuillemenot AE-15
- Vuillemenot AE-15 Motoplaneur
- Vuillemenot Biplace

=== VSB ===
(Vysokoškolského Sportu Brno)

- VSB-35 Žebravý – OŠTÁDAL, Václav & GoIdy, J.
- VSB-37 - OŠTÁDAL, Václav
- VSB-62 Mazlik a.k.a. Vega
- VSB-66 Orlice

=== VTC ===
(Vazduhoplovno Tehnicki Centar, Vrsac)

- VTC Delfin 1
- VTC Delfin 2
- VTC Delfin 3
- VTC Trener
- VTC HS-62
- VTC HS-64
- VTC Vuk-T
- VTC Kosava-2
- VTC Cirrus
- VTC SSV-17
- VTC Cirus HS-62
- VTC Cirus HS-64
- VTC Sole-77

=== Vyskočil ===
(Jaroslav Vyskočil)

- Vyskočil VŠ-504 Hemelice

=== VZ (glider constructor) ===
(VZ - Novi Sad Roda)

- VZ Jastreb
