= IIL IS-9 =

IS-9

General information
- Type: Single seat motor glider
- National origin: Romania
- Manufacturer: Intreprinderea de industrie Locală (IIL)
- Designer: Iosif Silimon
- Number built: 1

History
- First flight: 2 July 1958
- Developed from: IIL IS-5

The IIL IS-9 was a low powered, experimental pod and boom style motor glider, designed and built in Romania in the late 1950s.

== Design and development ==
From about 1950 to his death in February 1981, Iosif Silimon was Romania's most prominent glider designer, his aircraft distinguished by his initials. Over that time he also designed a few powered aircraft, of which the IS-9 motor glider was the first built by IIL, flying for the first time on 2 July 1958. Its layout had much in common with the IS-5 pod and boom glider, but as well as the engine the IS-9 had a new and shorter span wing and a tricycle undercarriage.

The new high wing of the IS-9 had a span of only 13 m (42 ft 8 in) and was mounted with a dihedral of 2.5°. In plan it had a rectangular centre section, extending to about mid-span, with straight-tapered outer panels. The wing sections were the same NACA ones used on the IS-7 and IS-8 gliders. It was of wooden construction with a single wooden spar and a plywood-covered torsion box from the spar forward around the leading edge. Behind the spar the wing was fabric covered. There were fabric-over-ply-covered wooden slotted ailerons which occupied all the trailing edge of the outer panels. The wing tips carried the small, streamlined bodies known as salmons which were common at the time.

The deep oval section pod of the IS-9 was a sheet metal monocoque. Its single-seat cockpit was ahead of the wing leading edge, enclosed by a smoothly contoured, two-piece, side-opening perspex canopy. Rectangular, fuselage side-mounted airbrakes were positioned under the wing. They each had an area of 0.45 m^{2} (4.8 sq ft), larger than those on the IS-5. The pod ended abruptly under the trailing edge, with a 15 kW (20 hp) engine of unknown make in the rear driving a small-diameter, two-blade propeller. The fixed tricycle undercarriage was mounted on the bottom of the pod, with small wheels and a narrow track.

Like the IS-5, the IS-9 had a steel tube boom and a very similar empennage to that of the glider. Its ply covered fin extended both above and below the boom, carrying a fabric covered, rounded, equally deep unbalanced rudder, broad at its heel. The fin also mounted a straight edged, ply-covered tailplane placed just above the boom which carried rounded elevators, mass balanced by a bob weight inside the fuselage, with gaps at their roots to clear the fin and a small cutout for rudder movement; the elevators were fabric-covered-over-ply skins like the ailerons and had a starboard-side trim tab.

The IS-9 was intended as an experimental aircraft, not for production. It was modified and renamed as the IS-9A in 1960, though no details of the alterations are known. Testing continued into at least the early 1960s.

== Specifications ==
Data from Sailplanes of the World, pp.200-1

General characteristics

- Crew: One
- Length: 6.64 m (21 ft 9 in)
- Wingspan: 12.0 m (39 ft 4 in)
- Height: 2.74 m (9 ft 0 in)
- Wing area: 15 m^{2} (160 sq ft)
- Aspect ratio: 11.3
- Airfoil: NACA 43015 root, 43012A from mid span outwards
- Empty weight: 230 kg (507 lb)
- Gross weight: 360 kg (794 lb)
- Powerplant: 1 × unknown , 15 kW (20 hp)
- Propellers: 2-bladed

Performance

- Stall speed: 52 km/h (32 mph, 28 kn)
- Never exceed speed: 180 km/h (110 mph, 97 kn) placard, in smooth air
- Rough air speed max: 140 km/h (87 mph; 76 kn)
- Aerotow speed: 120 km/h (75 mph; 65 kn)
- Maximum glide ratio: best 23.5 at 80 km/h (50 mph)
- Rate of sink: 0.85 m/s (167 ft/min) minimum, at 65 km/h (40 mph). Jane's 1962 data give slightly poorer (about 5-6%) best glide ratio and sink rate, at lower speeds
- Wing loading: 24 kg/m^{2} (4.9 lb/sq ft)
