= Aeronautical Museum (Belgrade) =

- Музеј ваздухопловства Muzej vazduhoplovstva
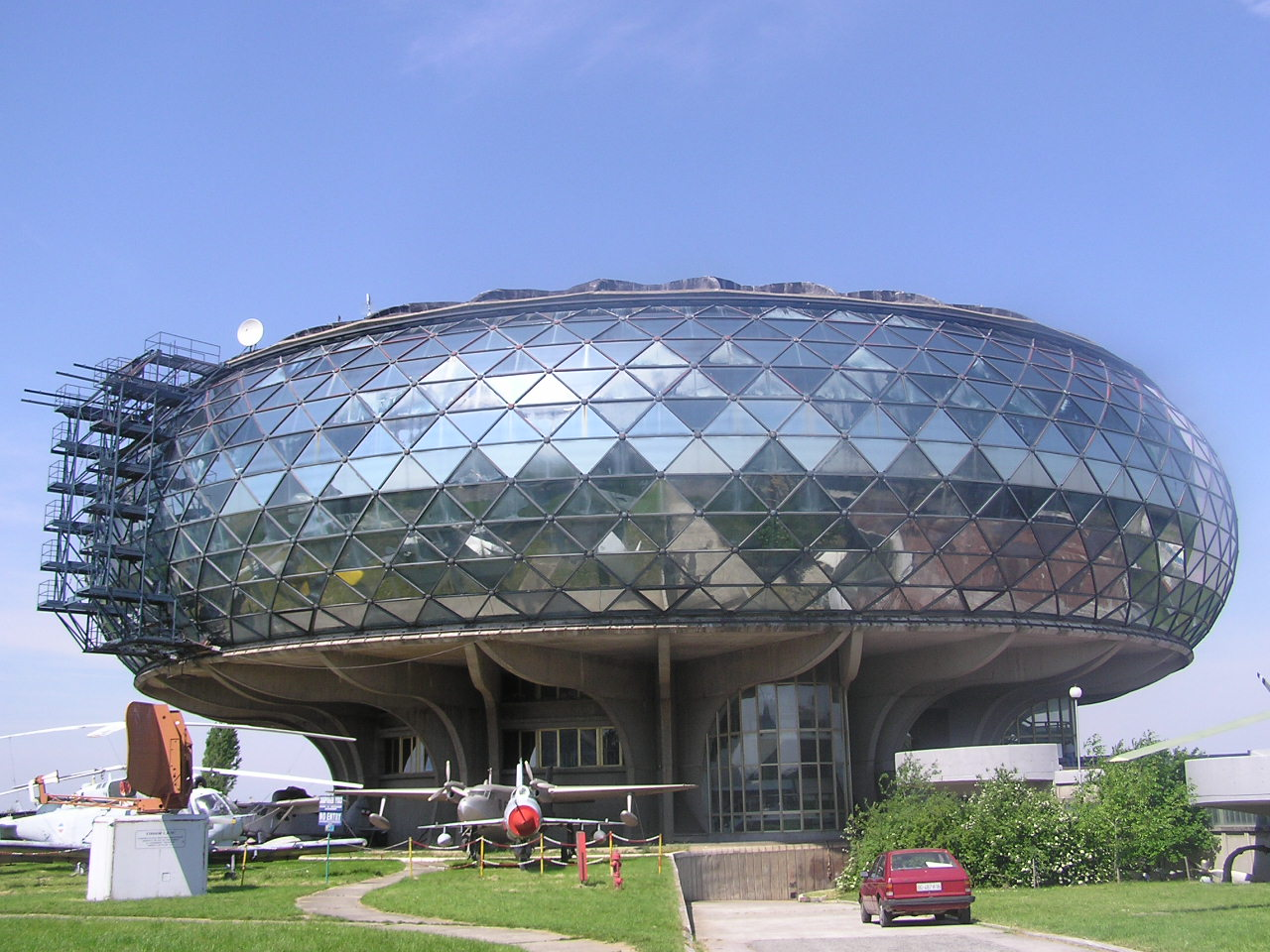
- View from outside
- Established: 1957; 69 years ago
- Location: Surčin, Belgrade, Serbia
- Coordinates: 44°49′8″N 20°17′7″E
- Type: Aviation museum
- Curator: Zoran Radojević
- Website: www.aeronauticalmuseum.com

The Aeronautical Museum, formerly known as the Yugoslav Aviation Museum, is a museum located in Surčin, Belgrade, the capital of Serbia. Founded in 1957, the museum is located adjacent to Belgrade Nikola Tesla Airport. The current facility, designed by architect Ivan Štraus, was opened to the public on 21 May 1989.

== History ==
In 1975 JAT, the national flag carrier, donated 48 a (52,000 sq ft) of land for the museum and the museum later purchased further 2.7 ha (6.7 acres). Construction of the present building of the museum began in the mid-1970s. The construction work dragged on, so it was only in late 1988 that the setting of the first permanent exhibition began. The museum's new location was ceremonially opened on 21 May 1989.

The museum owns over 200 aircraft previously operated by the Yugoslav Air Force (both royal and communist), Serbian Air Force, and others, as well as aircraft previously flown by several civil airliners and private flying clubs. It also owns the only known surviving example of the Fiat G.50. The most valuable collections are housed in geodesic glass building, with additional aircraft displayed on the surrounding grounds.

The museum also displays the wreckage of a downed USAF F-117 Nighthawk and F-16 Fighting Falcon, both shot down during the NATO bombing of Yugoslavia in 1999. In addition, the collection consists of more than 130 aviation engines, more radars, rockets, various aeronautical equipment, over 20,000 reference books and technical documentation as well as more than 200,000 photographs.

== Collection ==
New 'Rocket and Radar' museum exhibition will be constructed.

Existing missiles and radars in museum:

- P-15 Termit
- S-75 Dvina

=== Gliders ===
Aircraft	Registration	Serial number	Note
DFS 30 Kranich	YU-5014	161	
DFS 66 Grunau Baby III	YU-2113	151	
DFS 68 Weihe	YU-4073	443	
DFS 68 Weihe	YU-4089	492	
DFS 68 Weihe	YU-4093	491	
DFS 70 Olympia Meise	YU-4106	33	
20.Maj Čavka	YU-2227		
20.Maj Ilindenka 1T	YU-4108	3005	
20.Maj Ilindenka 1T	YU-4109	3006	
FAJ Jastreb Košava 2		1	
FAJ Jastreb Vuk-T (VTC-76)	YU-4422	346	
Ikarus Košava 60	YU-5022	1	
Ikarus/Letov Orao IIc	YU-4096	185	
Ikarus Meteor 60	YU-4103		Prototype
ILZS Jastreb 54	YU-3056	251	
VTRZ Jastreb Roda	YU-5210	24	
Letov Jastreb 54	YU-3029	195	
Koser KB-3 Jadran	YU-6001	104	
LIBIS-17	YU-5069	319	
SVC Čavka	YU-2127		
SVC Mačka	YU-4107	3	
SVC Vrabac A			
Utva M/J1	YU-UTVA		
VTC Cirrus HS-64D	YU-5341	118	
VTC Delfin II	YU-4138	45	
VTC Trener	YU-4169	79	

=== Helicopters ===
Aircraft	Origin	Registration	Serial number	Note
Hiller UH-12A	United States	YU-HAB	143	under restoration
Kamov Ka-25PL	Soviet Union	11323	4912519	
Kamov Ka-28PL	Soviet Union	11401 11402	5235003720222 5235003720223	
PZL Mi-2	Soviet Union/Poland	12506	511103059	
PZL Mi-2	Soviet Union/Poland	12512 12513 12514 12515	511110059 541307129 541327129 541309129	
Mil Mi-4A	Soviet Union	12013	6103	
Mil Mi-8T	Soviet Union	12208	0915	
Westland WS-51 Dragonfly Mk.IB	United Kingdom	11503	WA/H/97	
Sikorsky (SOKO) S-55-5	United States	11714	WA9-10-2319	

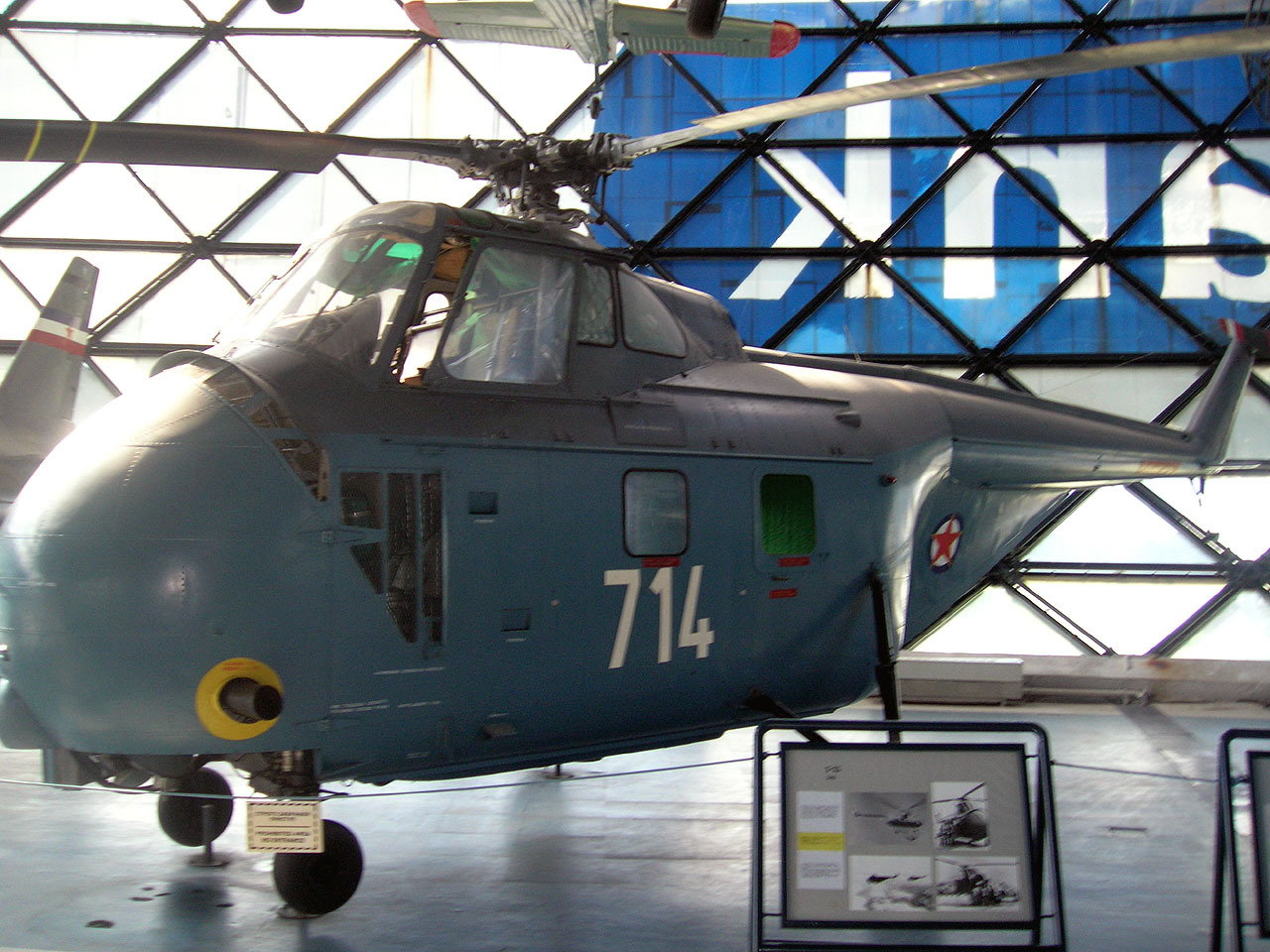
Sikorsky (SOKO) S-55-5

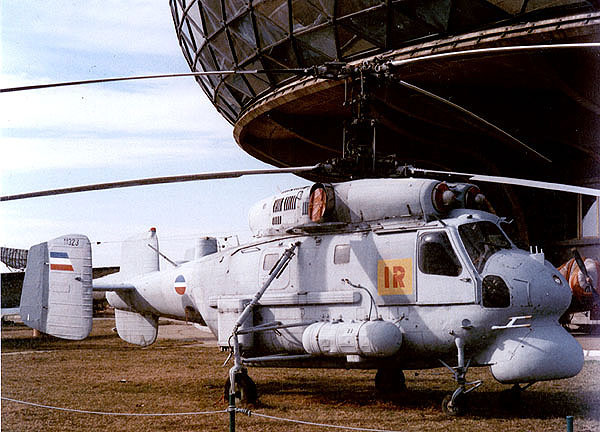
Kamov Ka-25PL

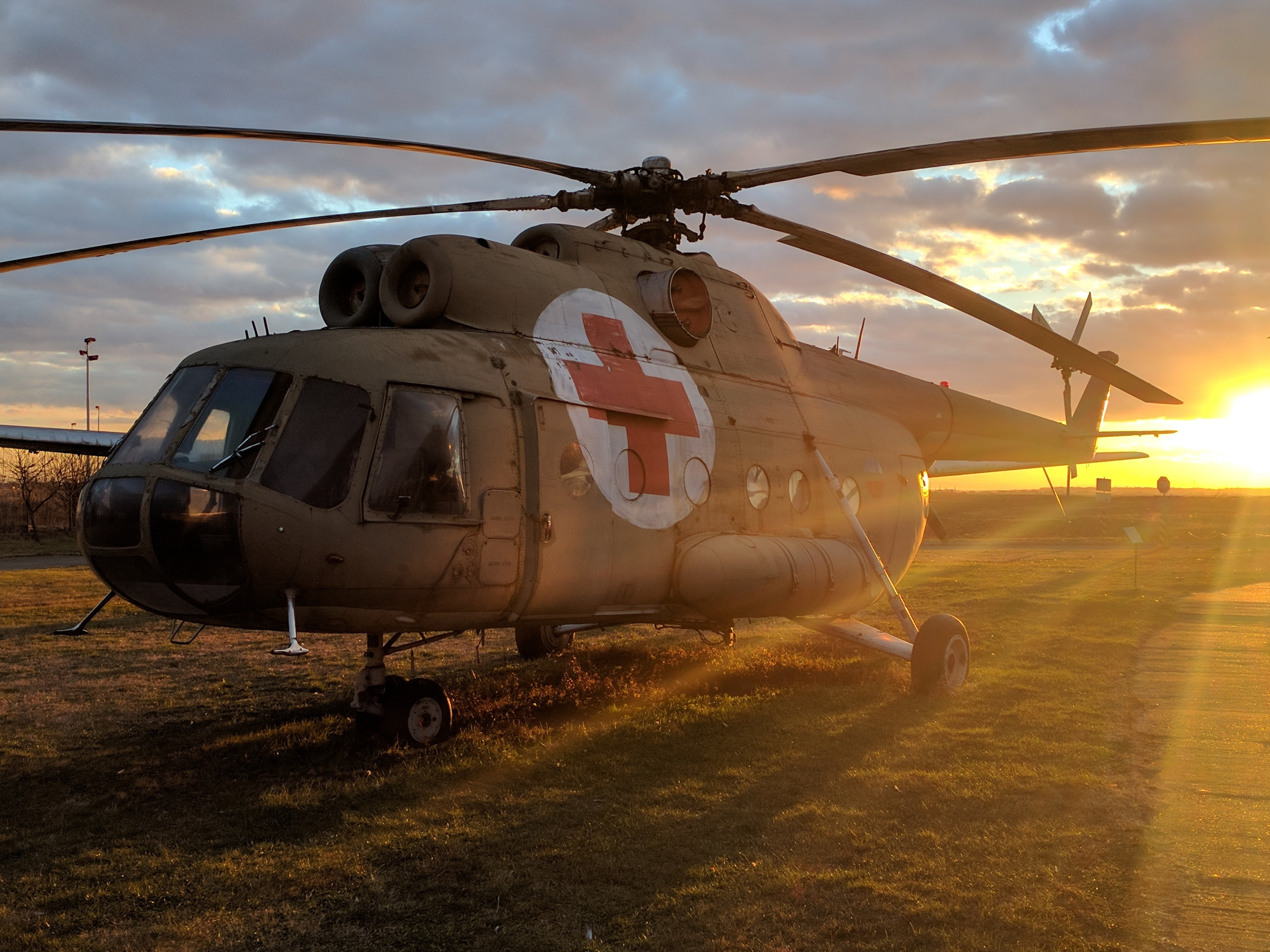
Mi-8

=== Piston-engine aircraft ===
Aircraft	Origin	Registration	Serial number	Note
AAK BS-1 Student	Yugoslavia	YU-CKK		Prototype
ATZ CA-51	Yugoslavia	YU-CMH YU-CMK		
ATZ V-55	Yugoslavia	YU-CMR	prototype	
Boeing (Stearman) A.75N-1	United States	YU-BAD	75–7614	ex-USN N2S-3 BuAer 37993, ex-N5115N
Boeing (Stearman) PT-17-75	United States	YU-BAI	75–3047	ex-USAAF PT-17 s/n 41-25540, ex-N5536O???
Bücker Bü 133D-1 Jungmeister	Nazi Germany	9102	1069	ex-NDH 7706
de Havilland D.H.82A Tiger Moth	United Kingdom	NM-150	86-470	ex YU-CHX/0902 (Morris built)
de Havilland D.H.104 Dove 2B	United Kingdom	72201	04432	ex YU-ABN/9751
de Havilland Canada DHC-2 Beaver Mk.I	Canada	70101	587	ex 0672/672
Douglas DC-3C (C-47A-25-DK Skytrain)	United States	YU-ABB YU-ABG	13713 14035/25480	ex 42-93765 ex 43–48219, ex KG8030, exG-AHLX
Douglas C-47A-35-DK Skytrain	United States	71214	16472/33220	ex 44–76888, ex KN586, ex 7323
Fiat G.50 Freccia	Italy	8	249	ex-MM6197, ex-NDH 3505, awaiting restoration
Mraz K-65A Čap	Nazi Germany	9393 / YU-COE	91	(Fiesseler Fi 156 Storch)
Focke-Wulf Fw-190F-8/R1	Nazi Germany	3	930838	
Grumman-Schweitzer G-164A/400	United States	YU-BEU	498	ex N984X
Hawker Hurricane Mk.IVRP	United Kingdom	LD975/O	41H/368368,20-925	ex 9593
Ikarus Aero 2BE	Kingdom of Yugoslavia	875	YU-CVB	
Ikarus Kurir	Yugoslavia	50157 / YU-CCB	57	
Ikarus Kurir-L	Yugoslavia	50200 / YU-CBD	100	with Lycoming engine
Ikarus S-49A	Yugoslavia	2319	301118	
Ikarus S-49C	Yugoslavia	2400	50	
Ikarus 214D	Yugoslavia	61019/YU-ABP	019	
Ilyushin Il-2M3	Soviet Union	4154	308331	
Ilyushin Il-14P	Soviet Union	71301	146001121	ex 7401
Yakovlev Yak-3	Soviet Union	2252	8545	
Yakovlev Yak-9P	Soviet Union	2826	04–36	
Amiot AAC.1 Toucan	France	7208	222	ex F-BBYB (French built Ju 52/3m)
Junkers Ju 87B-2	Germany	9801	0406	awaiting restoration
Letov Ljubljana KB-6 Matajur	Yugoslavia	YU-CFD	177	
Lisunov Li-3	Soviet Union	7011	18422308	Li-2 with C-47A engines
Lockheed P-38L-5-LO Lightning	United States	9751	422–6790	ex 44–25786, awaiting restoration
Messerschmitt Bf 109G-2	Germany	9663	14792	ex Bulgarian Air Force
North American T-6G	United States	FT152	168–503	ex50-1289
North American P-51D-5-NA	United States	HL-L	109–26911	ex 44–13278, awaiting restoration
Nieuport XI C.1	France	12	27	ex F-WZBC, replica
Petlyakov Pe-2FT	Soviet Union	6054	18-426	
Polikarpov Po-2	Soviet Union	0089 / YU-CNT	01021	
Polikarpov Po-2V	Poland	0105 / YU-CNP	01096	
Republic F-47D-40-RE Thunderbolt	United States	13056	5609	ex44-90464
Rogozarski R-100	Kingdom of Yugoslavia	9251	23	uncompleted
Sarić No I	Austria-Hungary	I		Replica of an aircraft built in 1909 by Ivan Sarić
Short SA.6 Sealand I	United Kingdom	0662	SH.1567	ex G-AKLS, ex YU-CFK
Soko 522	Yugoslavia	60132 60157 60204	32 57 04	
Soko J-20 Kraguj	Yugoslavia	30002 30101 30103 30104 30106 30107 30108 30109 30114 30135 30144 30145 30147 30148 30152 30155 30157	001 003 004 006 007 008 009 014 019 028 029 031 032 036 039 041	Prototype
UTVA Aero 3	Yugoslavia	P 40186 / YU-CZA	86	Prototype
UTVA 65S	Yugoslavia	YU-BKI	736	
UTVA 66	Yugoslavia	51001 51002 51145 51221	0854 0866	Prototype Prototype
UTVA 66H	Yugoslavia	52101 52102 52104	0822 0823 0831	
UTVA 213-3	Yugoslavia	1352	92	
UTVA Lasta	Yugoslavia	54153		0 series
Vickers-Supermarine Spitfire LF Mk.Vc trop	United Kingdom	JK808/B	CBAF-4690,17-545	ex VF-H, ex 9489, RAF serial JK448
WSK-PZL M-18 Dromader	Poland	YU-BMX	1Z-010-01	Incomplete
Zlín Z-XII	Czechoslovakia	F-AQII	194	
Zlín Z 526M	Czechoslovakia	41104 / YU-DIO	102	
Zlín Z-37 Čmelák	Czechoslovakia	YU-BGL	819	
Zmaj Fizir FN	Kingdom of Yugoslavia	V	9	exYU-CAY/9009
Zmaj Fizir FP-2	Kingdom of Yugoslavia		15	ex9308, incomplete
General Atomics RQ-1 Predator	United States			wreckage

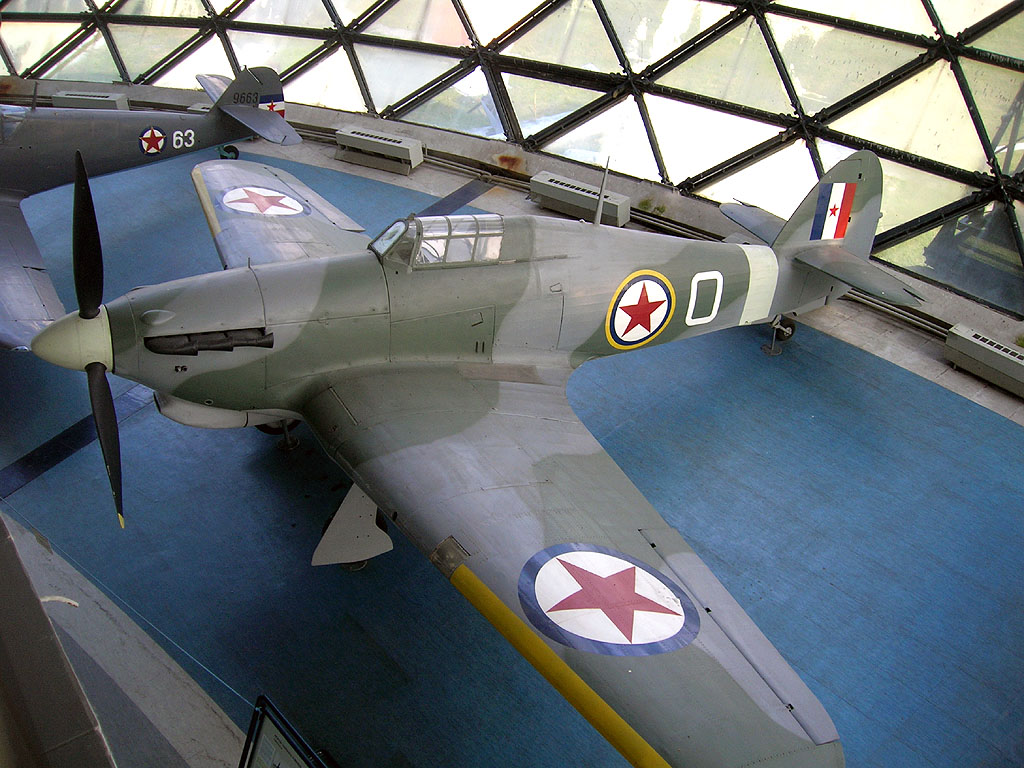
Hawker Hurricane Mk IVRP with Yugoslav Air Force markings

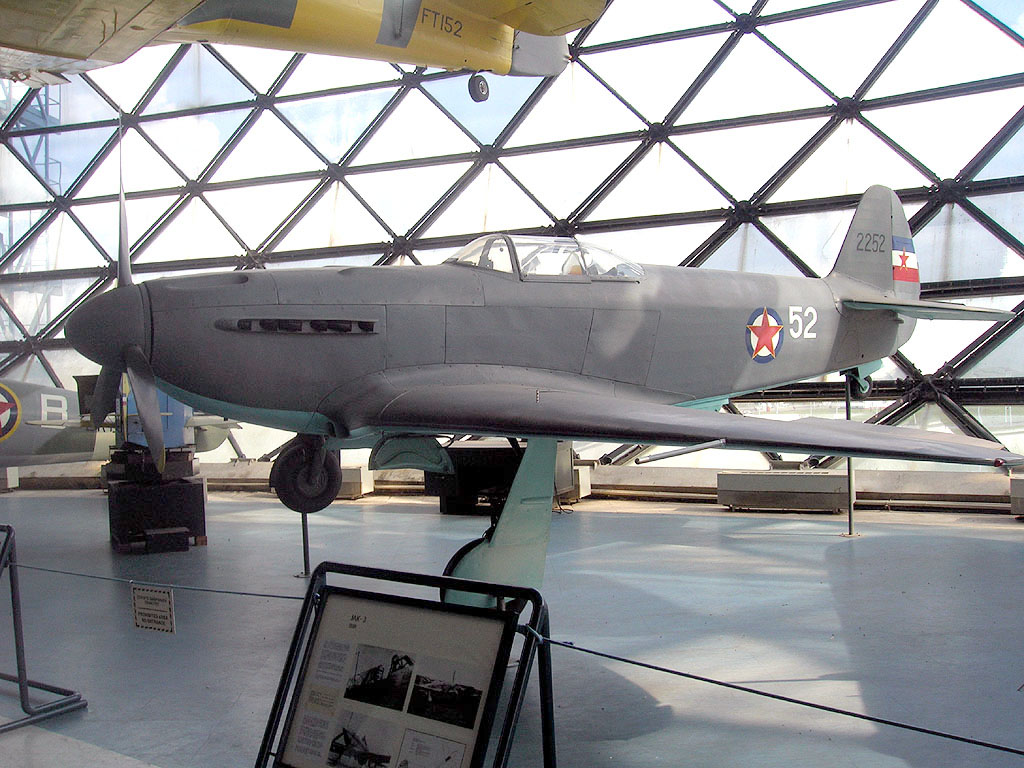
Yak-3

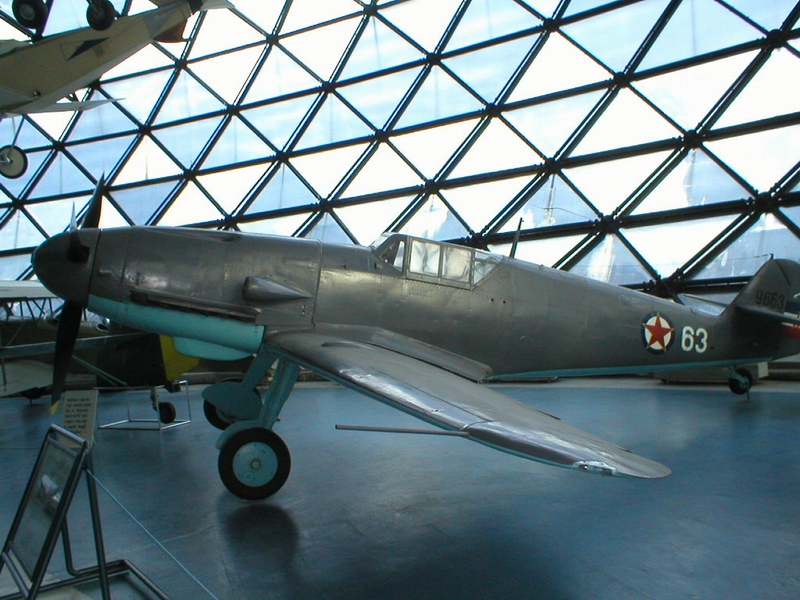
Messerschmitt Bf 109 with Yugoslav Air Force markings captured and used by Yugoslav Partisans during World War II.

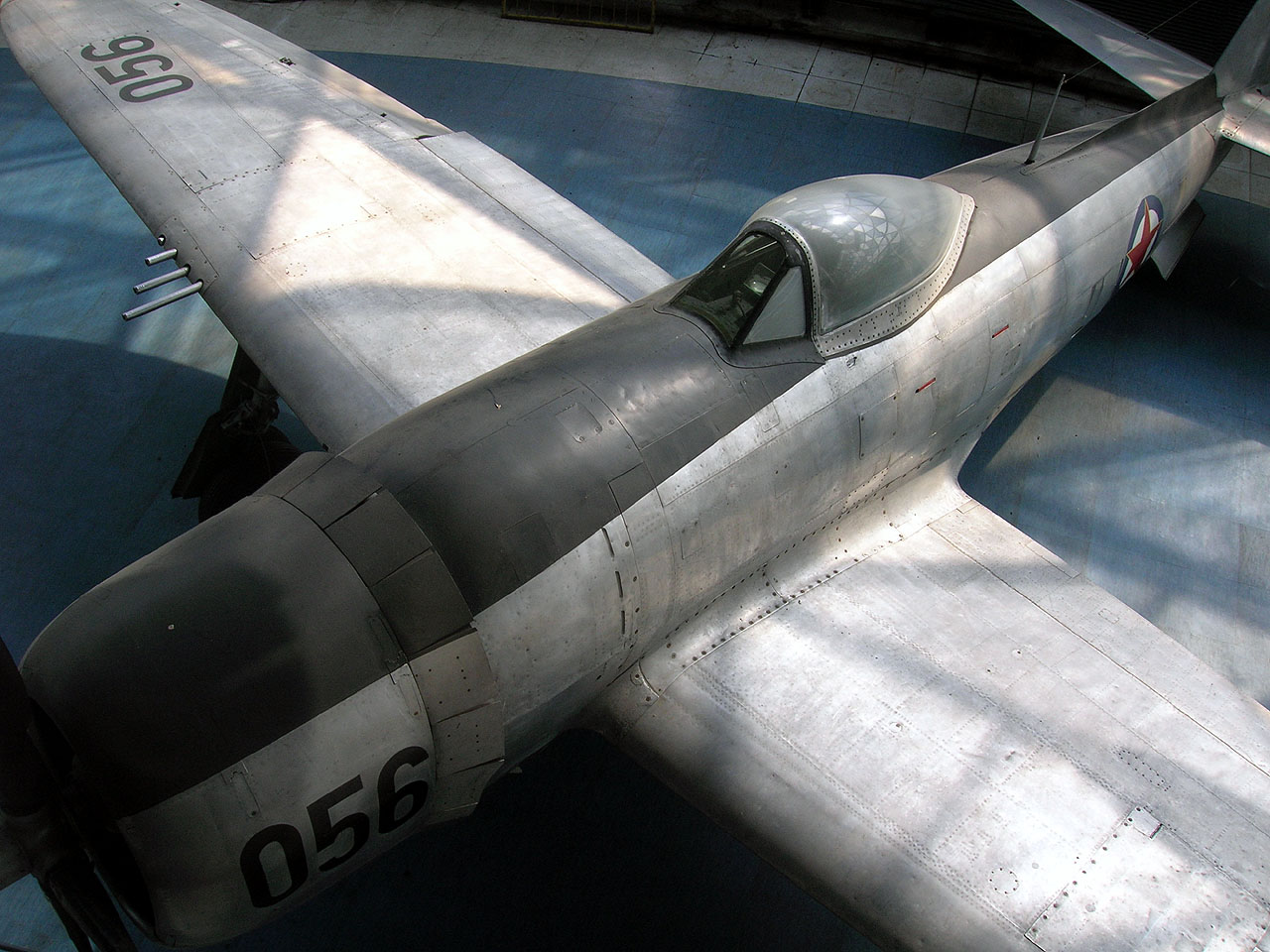
Republic P-47D Thunderbolt with Yugoslav Air Force markings.

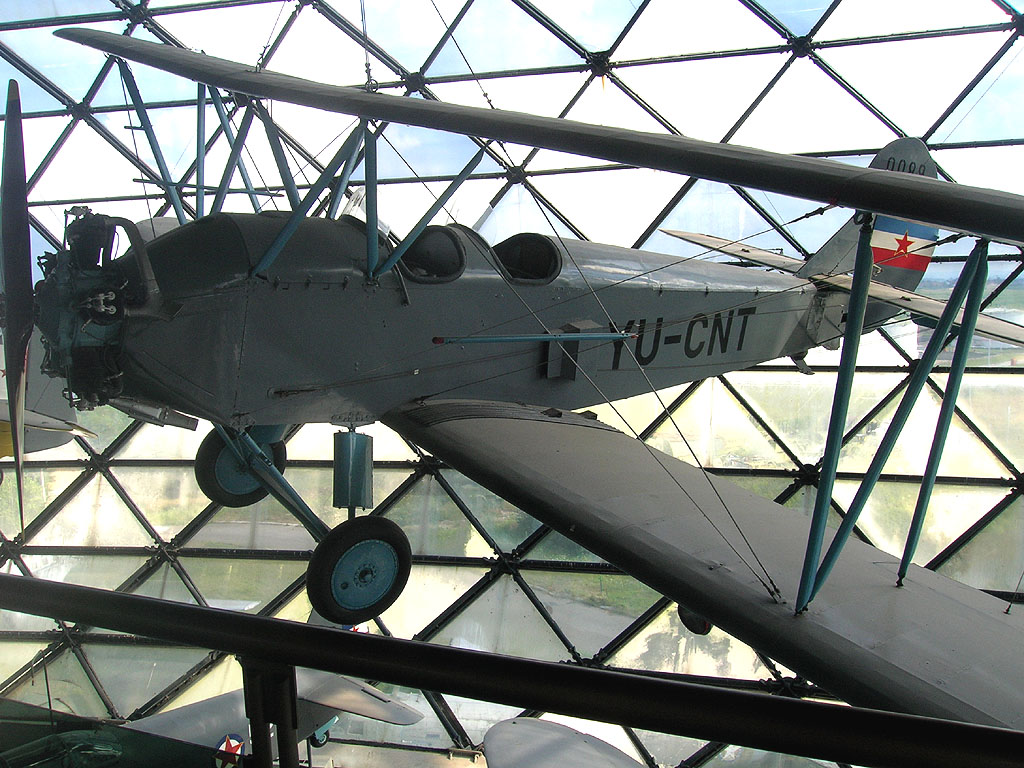
Polikarpov Po-2

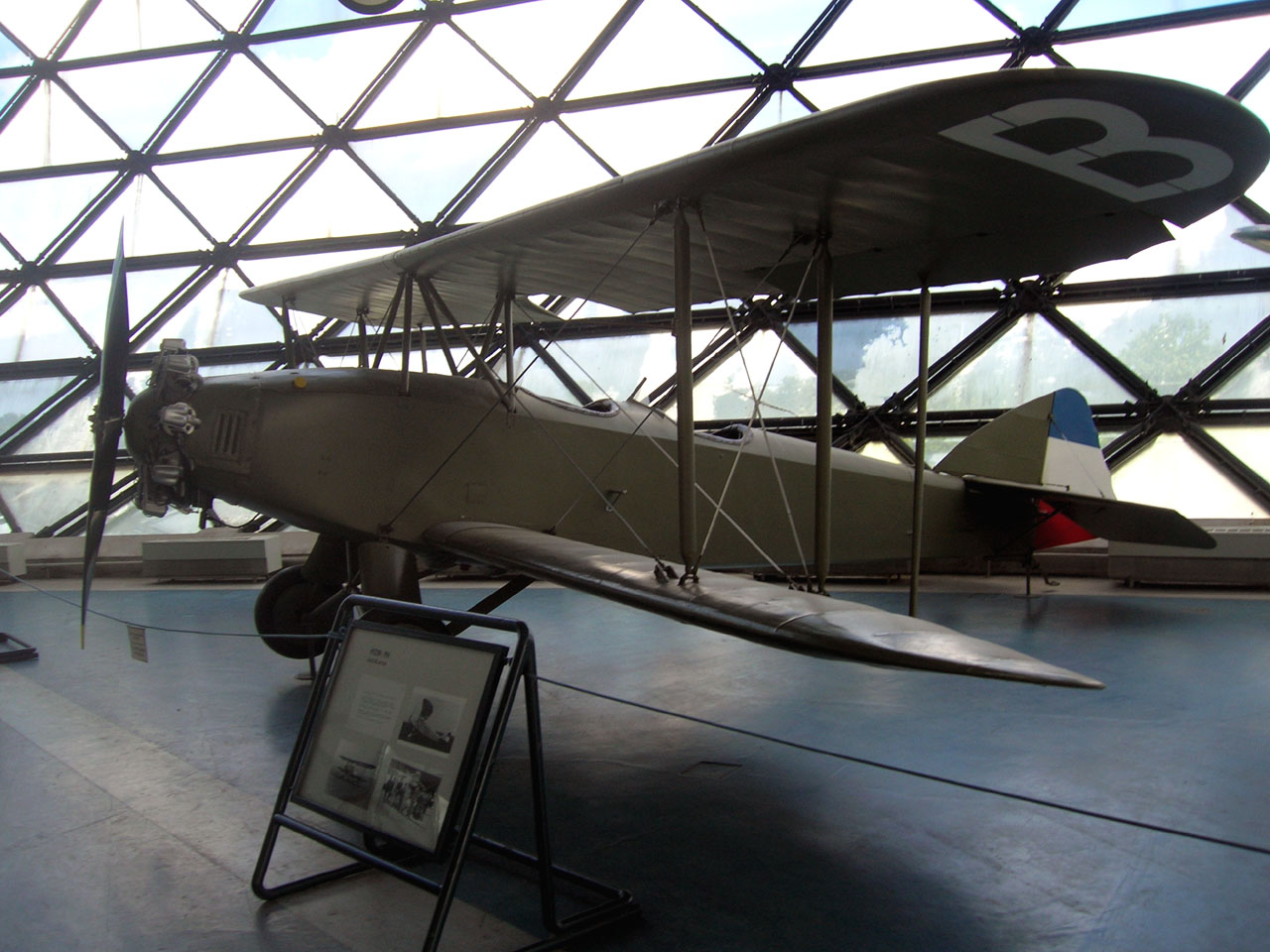
Fizir FN

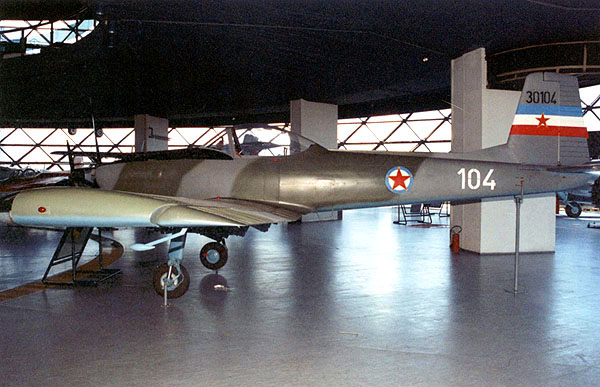
Soko J-20 Kraguj

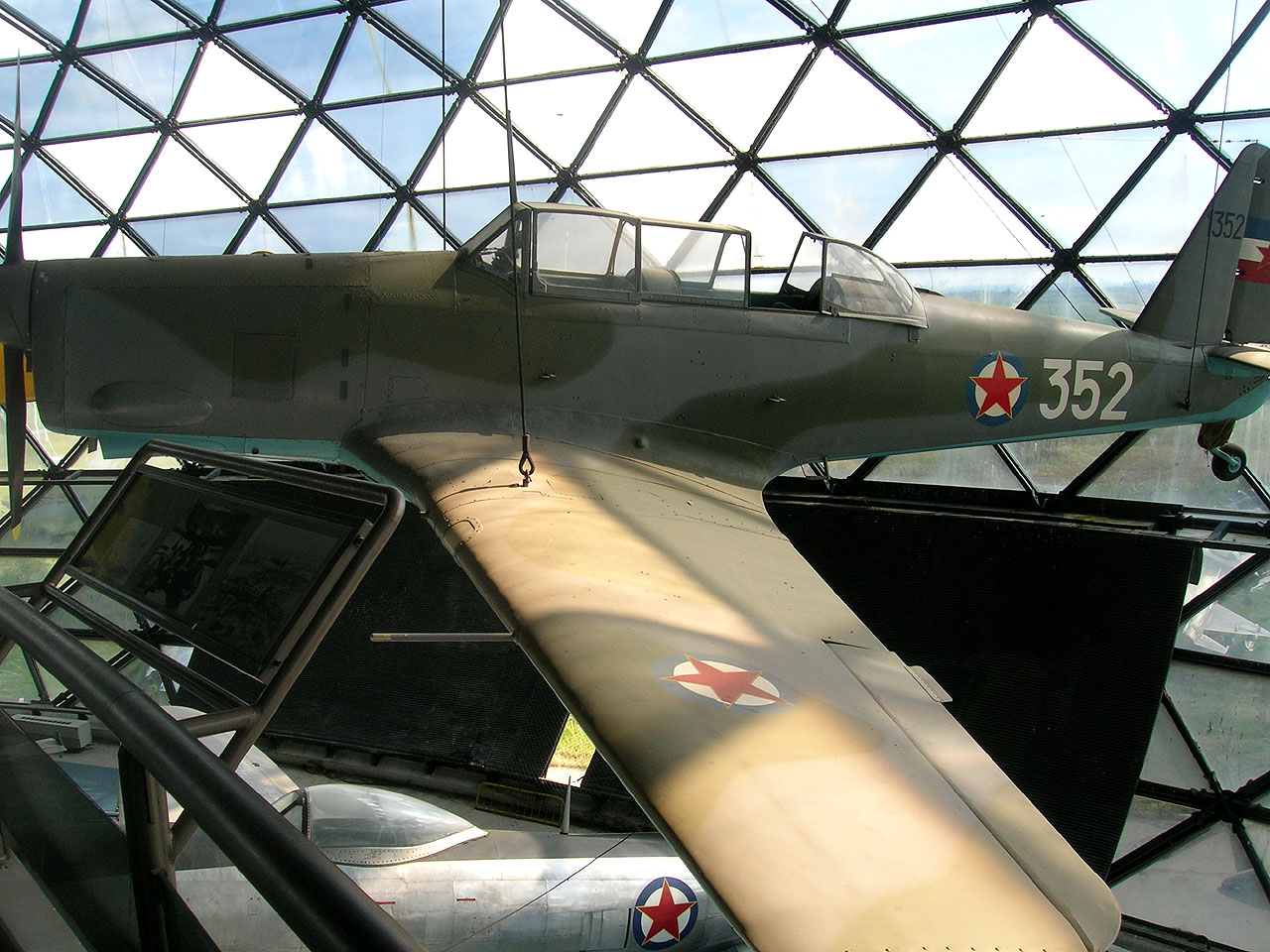
Utva 213

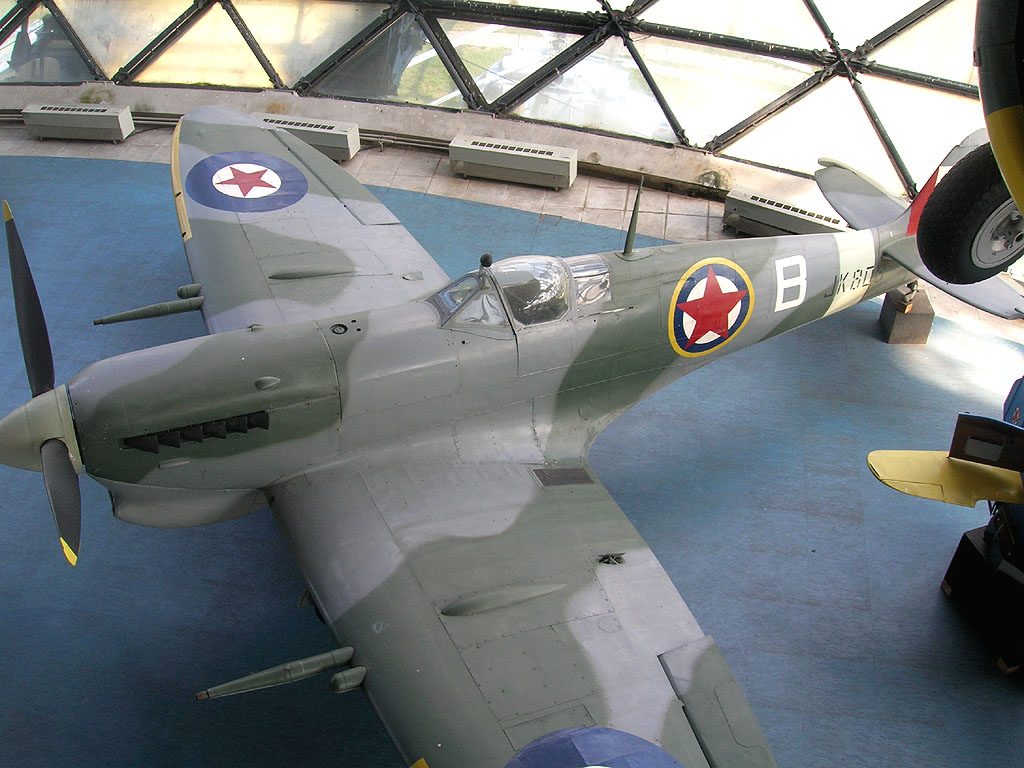
Supermarine Spitfire LF Mk VC used by Yugoslav RAF squadron.

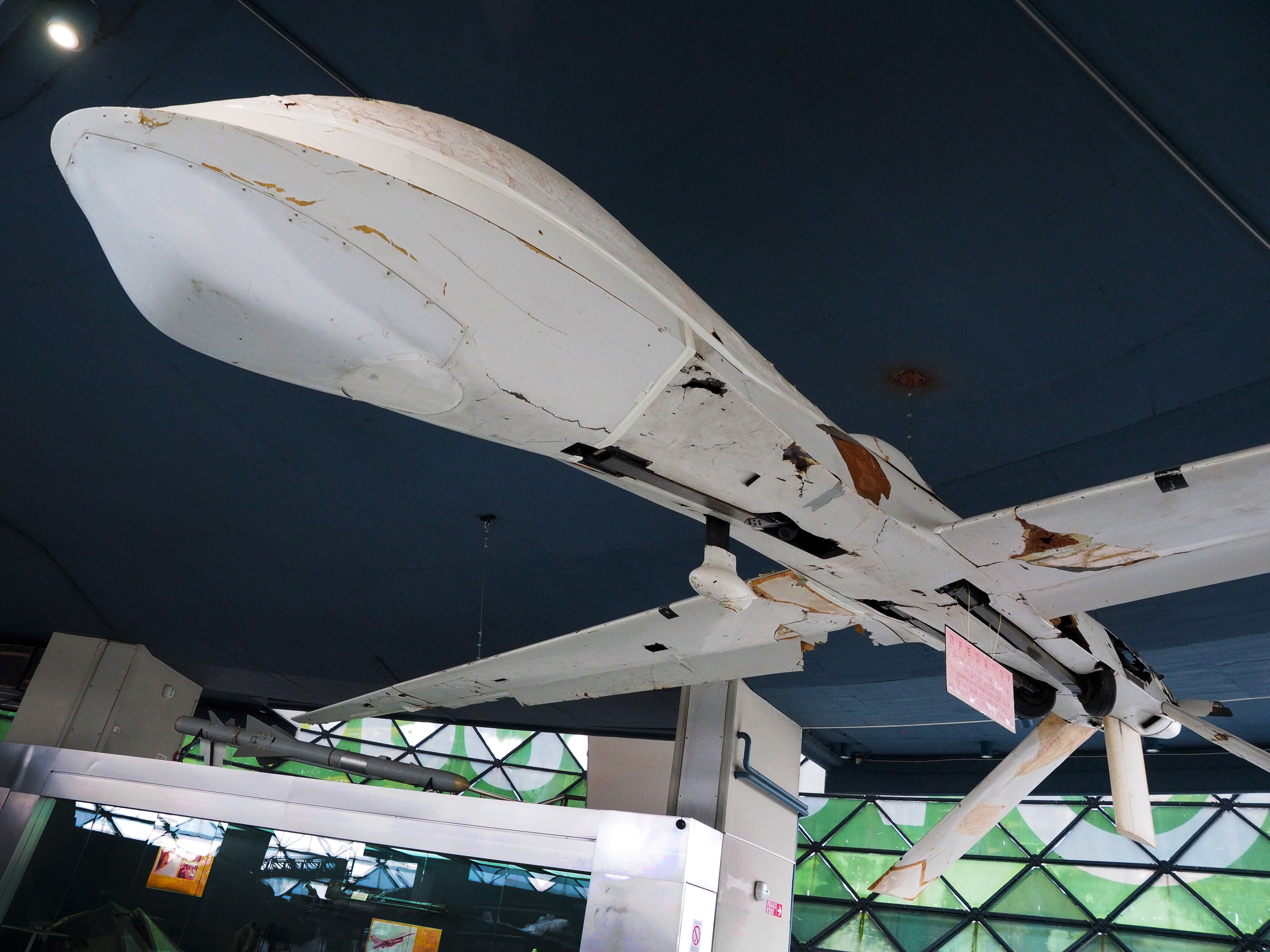
MQ-1 Predator

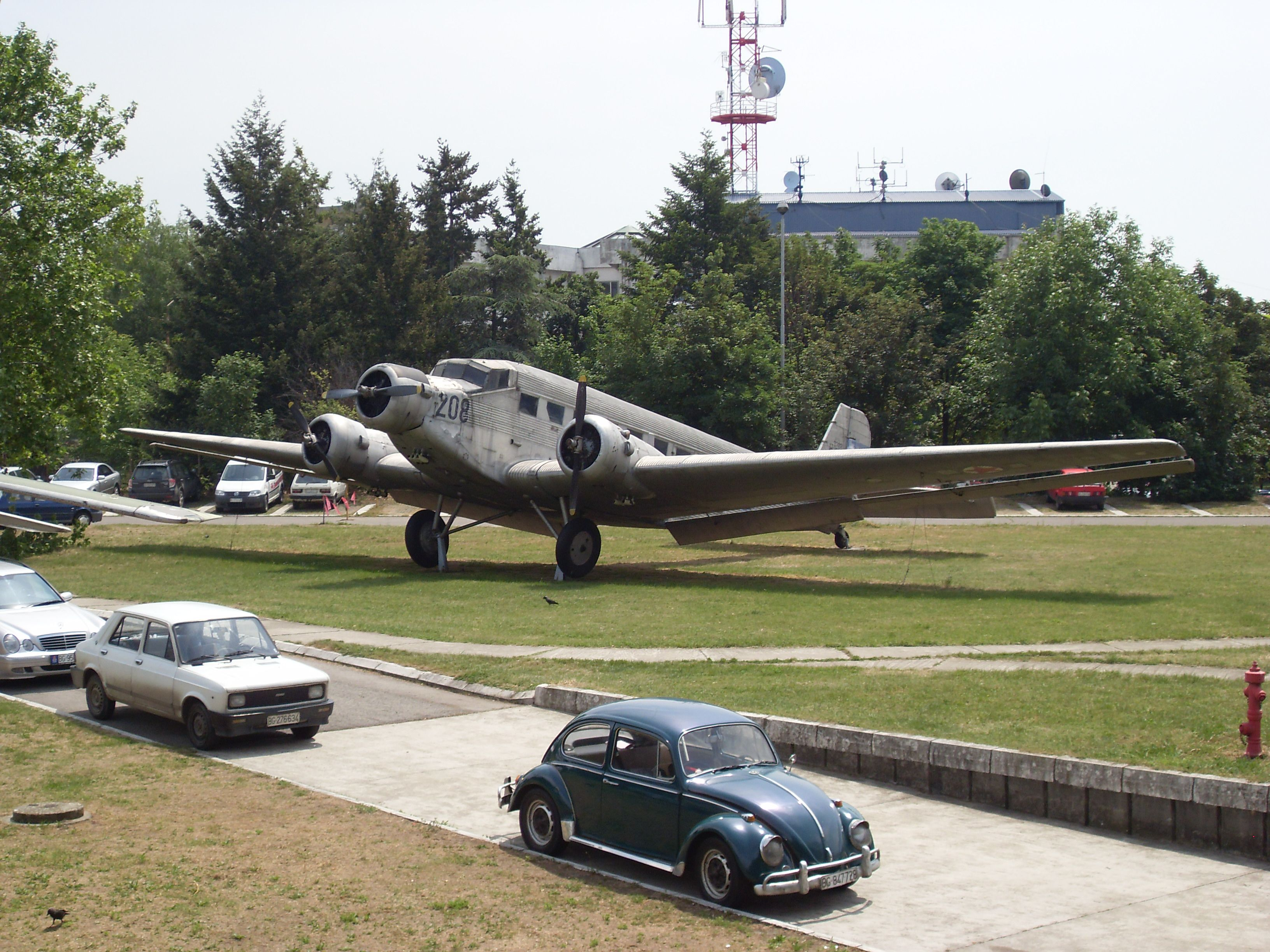
Junkers Ju 52/3m (exF-BBYB) outside the building

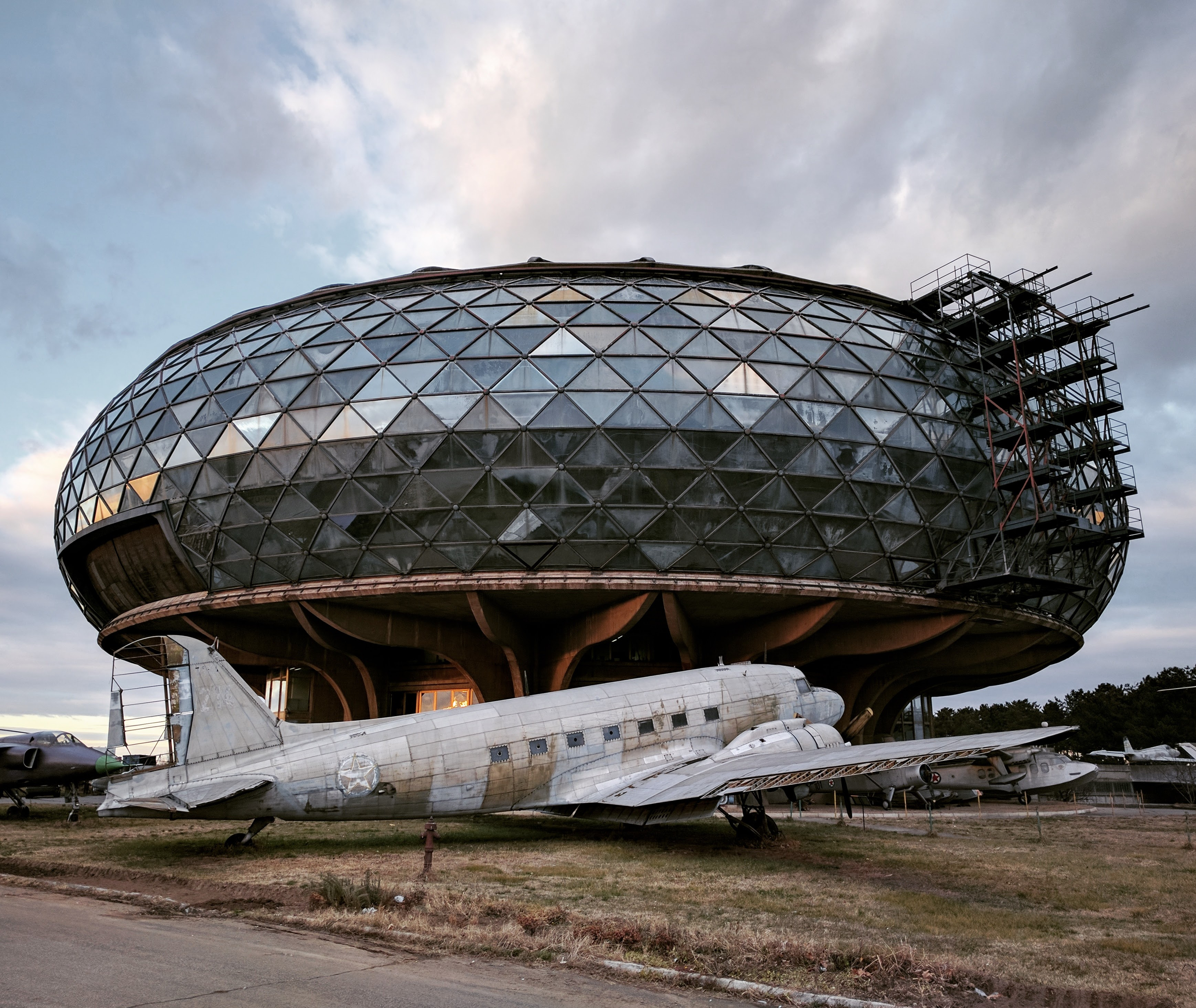
C-47

=== Jet aircraft ===
Aircraft	Origin	Registration	Serial number	Note
Boeing 727-2H9/Adv	United States	YU-AKF (JAT)	21038	Currently stored at Jat Tehnika, waiting for restoration for display in Museum
Canadair CL-13 Sabre Mk.IV	United States/Canada	11025 11054 11088 14102	756 439 638 190-748	ex 53–19856, ex XB955 ex 52–19539, ex XB636 ex 53–19738, ex XB875 ex 52-10023A
Folland Fo.141 Gnat F Mk.1	United Kingdom	11601	FL-14(G-39-8)	
Ikarus 451	Yugoslavia		2 (prototype)	
Ikarus 451M	Yugoslavia		prototype	
Ikarus Š 451-MM Matica	Yugoslavia	20001		Prototype
Ikarus T 451-MM Stršljen II	Yugoslavia	21002		Prototype
Lockheed F-117A Nighthawk	United States		82-806	Wreckage. Shot down on 27 March 1999
Lockheed T-33A-1-LO	United States	10024	580–8189	ex 52–9958
Lockheed Martin F-16 Fighting Falcon	United States		88-550	Wreckage. Shot down on 2 May 1999
Mikoyan-Gurevich MiG-21F-13	Soviet Union	22532	741702	
Mikoyan-Gurevich MiG-21U	Soviet Union	22909	3416	
Mikoyan-Gurevich MiG-21PFM	Soviet Union	22735	8407	
Mikoyan-Gurevich MiG-21US	Soviet Union	22953	03685149	
Mikoyan-Gurevich MiG-21R	Soviet Union	26103 26105	1707 1709	
Mikoyan-Gurevich MiG-21M	Soviet Union	22805 22818	3007 3115	
Mikoyan-Gurevich MiG-21UM	Soviet Union	16152 16158	516979071 516995091	
Mikoyan-Gurevich MiG-21bis	Soviet Union	17402 17405 17409	N75095222 75095251 75095293	
Mikoyan-Gurevich MiG-23MLD	Soviet Union	23269		Sent from Iraq for upgrades, never returned. Moved to unknown location on 14 August 2009.
North American F-86D Sabre	United States			
Republic F-84G-31-RE Thunderjet	United States	10501 10530 10525		ex52-2936 ex 52-8435 ex 52-2939 (recon)
Soko J-21 Jastreb	Yugoslavia	24001 24115 24122 24126 24128 24130 24142 24145 24155 24156 24159 24208 24210 24213 24214	015 024 028 030 032 044 047 061 062 065 074 076 079 080	Prototype
Soko IJ-21 Jastreb	Yugoslavia	24401 24404 24405 24410 24415 24418 24421 24454 24456 24457	001 004 005 010 015 018 021 034 036 037	
Soko NJ-21 Jastreb	Yugoslavia	23502 23505 23506 23507 23511 23512	005 008 009 010 012 014	
Soko INJ-21 Jastreb	Yugoslavia	23513	015	
Soko J-22 Orao	Yugoslavia	25001 25107 25120	007 045	Prototype
Soko IJ-22 Orao	Yugoslavia	25719 25721 25723 25724	019 021 023 024	
Soko INJ-22 Orao	Yugoslavia	25606	006	
Soko NJ-22 Orao	Yugoslavia	25505 25506 25509 25511	014 015 018 020	
Soko G-2 Galeb	Yugoslavia	23001 23108 23154 23156	108 154 156	Prototype
Soko G-4 Super Galeb	Yugoslavia	23629 23636 23733	009 016 065	Aircraft tail section
Sud-Aviation SE-210 Caravelle	France	YU-AHB (JAT)	135	ex F-WJAK

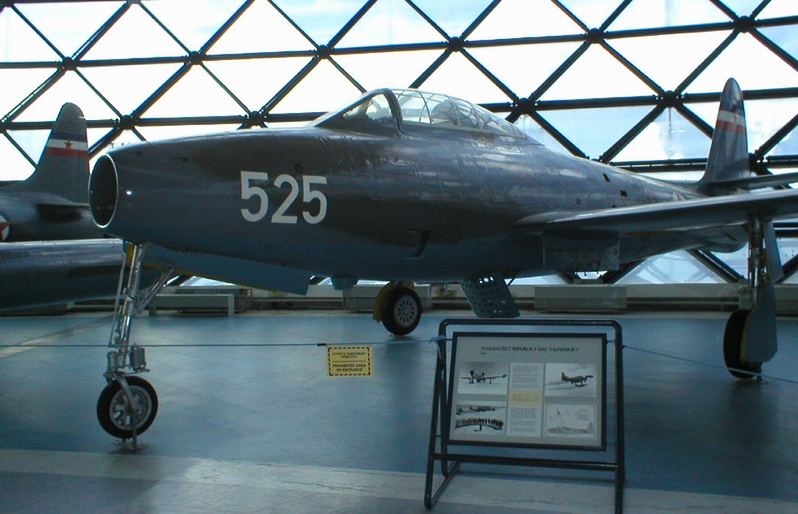
Republic F-84 "Thunderjet"

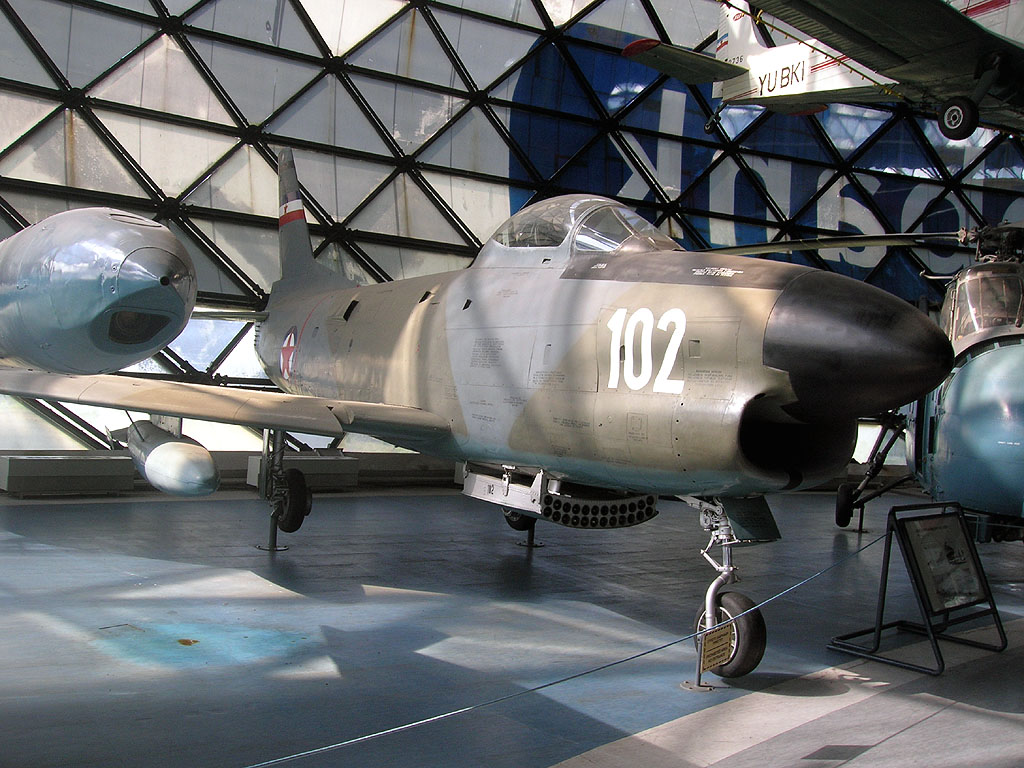
F-86D Sabre

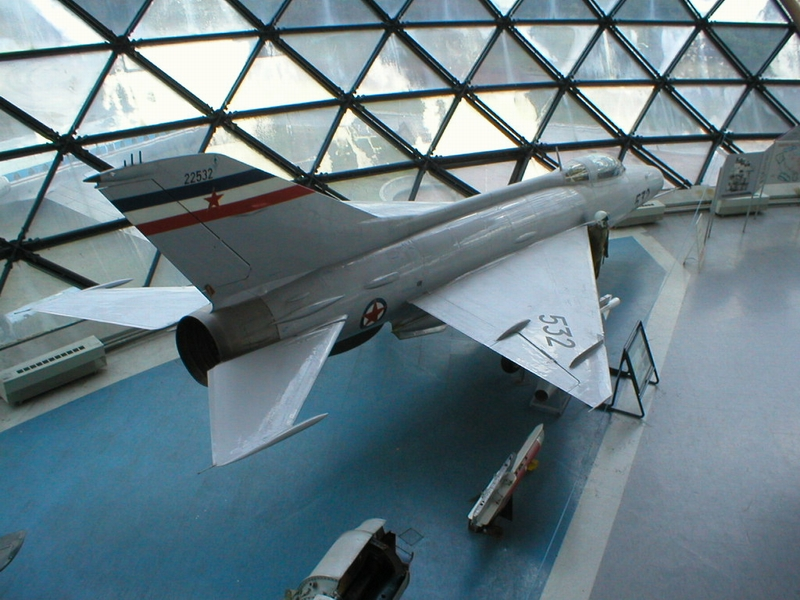
MiG-21F-13

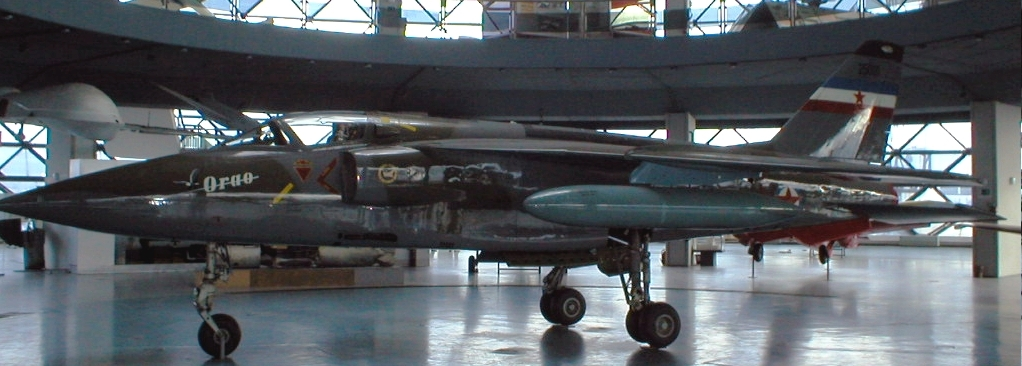
Soko J-22 Orao prototype

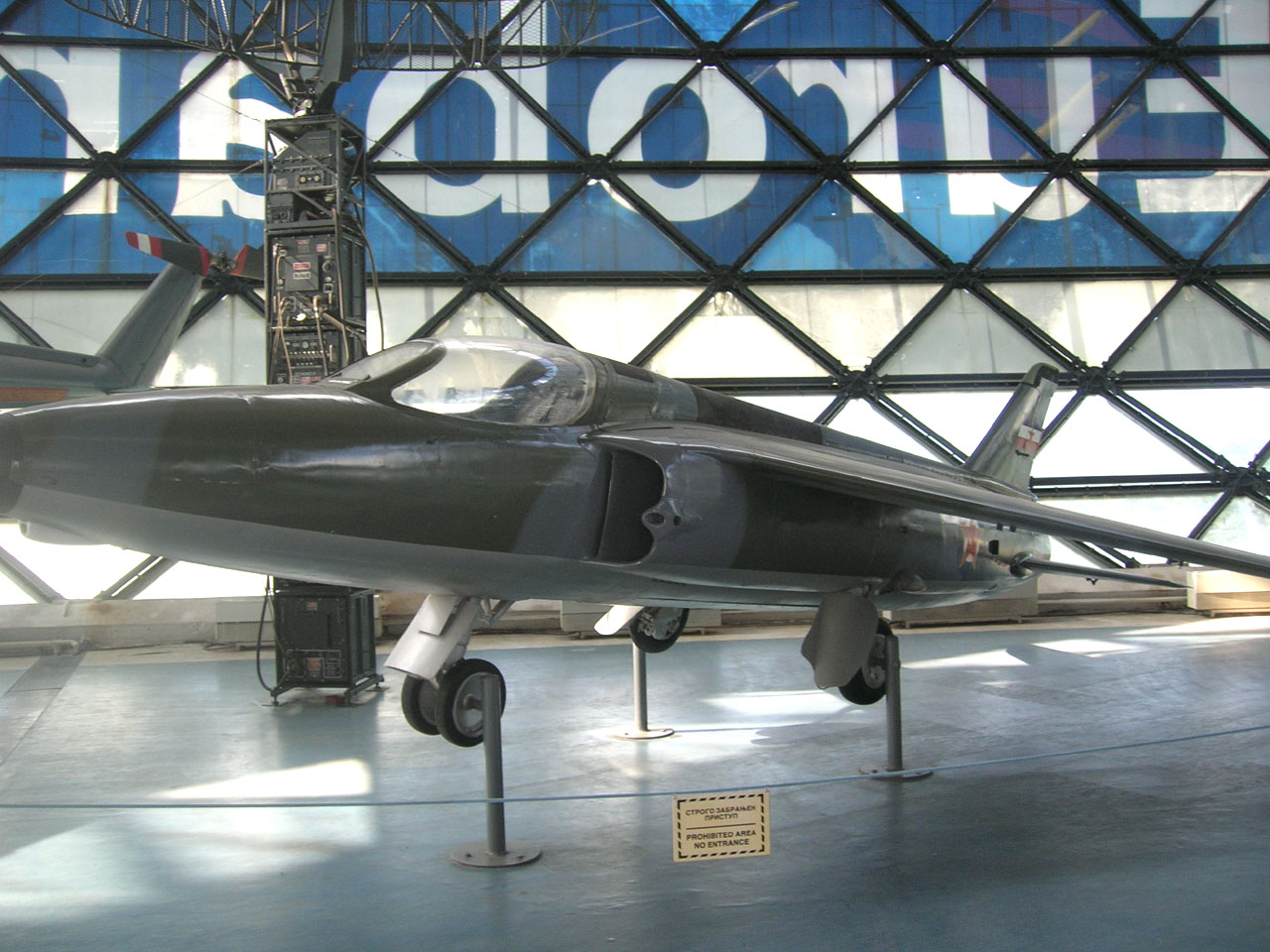
Folland (Fo.141) Gnat F Mk.1

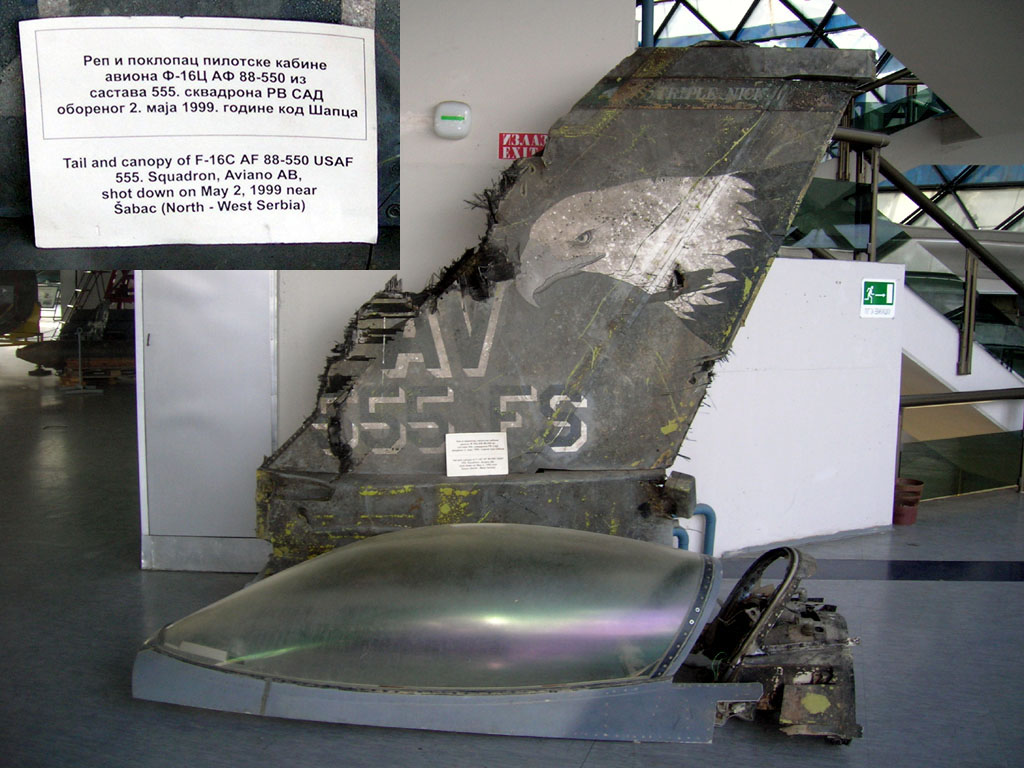
Tail and canopy of F-16CG shot down during the Operation Allied Force

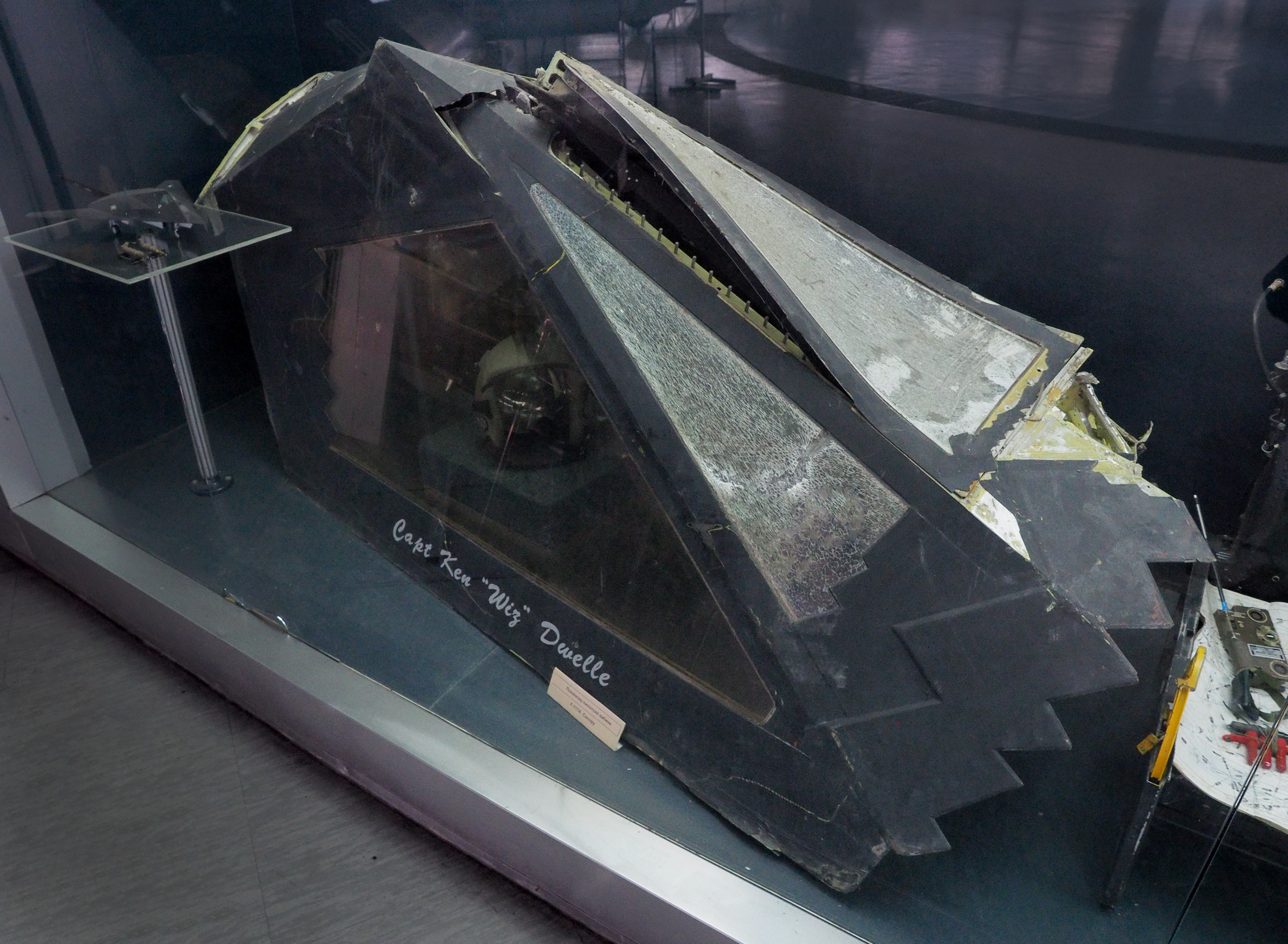
Canopy of F-117 shot down on 27 March 1999, near the village of Buđanovci, Serbia

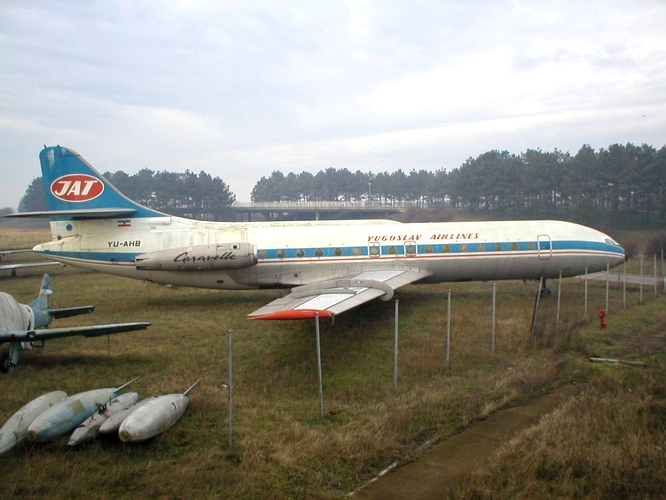
JAT Sud-Aviation Se.210 Caravelle

=== Other ===
Item	Origin	Registration	Serial number	Note
BGM-109 Tomahawk	United States			Wreckage
Cossor C.R. 787	United Kingdom			Radar
R-25 Vulkan	Yugoslavia			SAM missile
Westinghouse AN/TPS-1D	United States			Radar

== See also ==
- List of aviation museums
- List of museums in Belgrade
- List of museums in Serbia
