= LIBIS-17 =

General information
- Type: Two seat advanced glider trainer
- National origin: Slovenia
- Manufacturer: LIBIS (Letalski Institut "Branko Ivanus" Slovenia), Ljubliana
- Designer: Jože Prhavc
- Number built: 12 by Spring 1964

History
- Introduction date: first production model June 1963
- First flight: October 1961

The LIBIS-17 was a two-seat sailplane for advanced glider training. It was built in Yugoslavia (Slovenia) in the early 1960s and achieved production.

== Design and development ==
The LIBIS-17, originally known as the LIBIS KB-17, was designed to provide tandem seat training in advanced gliding flight, including aerobatics and cloud flying, as well as solo experience to gold and silver C standard as a single seater. It had a high wing of 5° dihedral, built around a single spar. The leading edge was a plywood torsion box, supported by Styrofoam, and the rest of the wing was fabric covered. The ailerons were of the Frise type, wooden, foam filled and fabric covered. It had Hütter type plate spoilers just behind the spar. Both vertical and horizontal rear stabilizers were all-moving, single piece surfaces, fitted with servo tabs. Both were wooden structures, near-rectangular in shape, with Styrofoam filling.

The fabric covered fuselage had a steel tube structure. The wing was mounted on a pylon which formed the rear of the cockpit. This seated two in tandem, under a framed, forward hinged, single piece canopy. A transparency in the wing leading edge assisted the upwards visibility from the rear seat. Aft of the wing the fuselage was slender and of rectangular cross-section. The LIBIS-17 had a bicycle undercarriage with a single mainwheel, fitted with brakes, and a smaller nosewheel.

The prototype LIBIS-17 first flew in October 1961. The first production aircraft followed in June 1963 and 12 had been built by the following Spring, with production continuing. There is photographic evidence of a motorised version, with an engine and propeller on a mast above the wing.

== Aircraft on display ==
A LIBIS-17 is on display in the Museum of Aviation (Belgrade).

== Specifications ==
Data from Jane's All the World's Aircraft 1966/7

General characteristics

- Crew: 2
- Length: 7.64 m (25 ft 1 in)
- Wingspan: 17.00 m (55 ft 9 in)
- Height: 2.73 m (8 ft 11 in)
- Wing area: 22.10 m^{2} (237.9 sq ft)
- Aspect ratio: 13
- Airfoil: NACA 63_{3}.618
- Empty weight: 335 kg (739 lb)
- Max takeoff weight: 515 kg (1,135 lb)

Performance

- Maximum speed: 222 km/h (138 mph, 120 kn) smooth air
- Stall speed: 59 km/h (37 mph, 32 kn)
- Maximum glide ratio: 27:1 best, at 94 km/h (58 mph)
- Rate of sink: 0.86 m/s (169 ft/min) minimum, at 75 km/h (47 mph)
