= Ikarus Meteor =

1950s Yugoslavian sailplane

Meteor
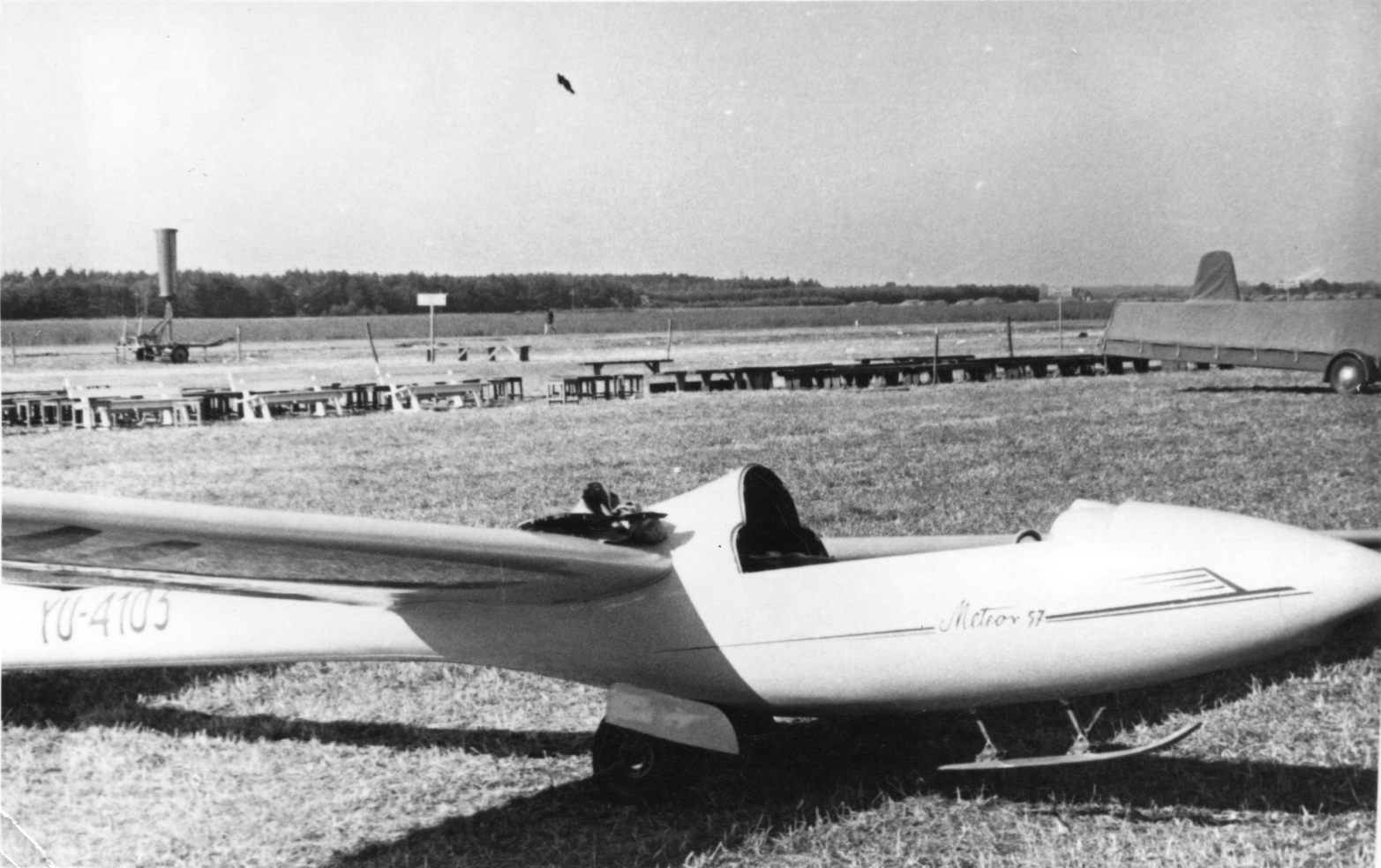
- Meteor 57, probably at Jeżów Sudecki airstrip, Poland, c.a. 1958

General information
- Type: Single seat competition sailplane
- National origin: Yugoslavia
- Designer: Boris Cijan, Stanko Obad and Miho Mazovec
- Number built: probably only 2

History
- First flight: 1955

The Ikarus Meteor is a long-span, all-metal sailplane designed and built in Yugoslavia in the 1950s. It competed in World Gliding Championships (WGC) between 1956 and 1968 and was placed fourth in 1956; it also set new triangular-course world speed records.

== Design and development ==
The Meteor was designed by the same duo, Boris Cijan and Stanko Obad, who had produced the Orao glider which had achieved third place in the 1950 WGC. They were aided by Miho Mazovec and generously funded by the Yugoslav government. The result was "... without doubt the most advanced sailplane of its time." In 1955 almost all gliders had wooden structures, with perhaps a few unstressed GRP parts; in contrast the Meteor was all-metal, with a large, 20 m (65 ft 7 in) span and an aspect ratio of 25, values beyond the reach of wood. The optimum glide ratio of greater than 40:1 was good, but the high inter-thermal glide speed was exceptional.

The Meteor was one of a group of mid-1950s gliders to use the NACA 6 series laminar flow airfoil first adopted by the Ross-Johnson RJ-5, which required careful attention to profile control and surface finish. In plan the wings are straight tapered with unswept leading edges and forward sweep on the trailing edge. The wing tips carries small, elongated bodies termed "salmons" to dampen tip vortices, as on the slightly earlier Bréguet Mouette and has a constant 2° of dihedral. Completely metal-skinned, the wing is built around a box spar within which the thickened skin is internally stiffened with span-wise stringers. The whole trailing edge carries control surfaces; the outer quarter with conventional ailerons, and the rest roughly equally divided between narrower inboard ailerons which droop together when the final inboard section of camber changing flaps are depressed through as much as 20° for low-speed flight. These flaps can be raised by 11°, reducing the camber for high-speed flight. Schempp-Hirth type airbrakes are fitted at mid-chord, just aft of the box spar at about one third span.

The Meteor has a pod-and-boom style fuselage, with a long, single-piece canopy above the upper fuselage line, forward of the wing, under which the pilot sits in a reclined position. The under-wing, retractable monowheel undercarriage is assisted by a short, retractable, forward skid. Retraction is manual; there is a wheel brake. Behind the wing the fuselage has a circular cross-section. There is a long, shallow fillet or sub fin between fuselage and fin, both straight edged, and both rudder and fin extend well below the lower fuselage line to form a tail bumper. The rudder is horn balanced. Later revisions slightly increased rudder area. The high aspect ratio, straight tapered tailplane is mounted above the fuselage on the fillet forward of the fin's leading edge. The elevators are also aerodynamically balanced and originally carried a ground adjustable trim tab, later removed.

== Operational history ==
The Meteor was competitively long lived; its first WGC was in 1956 and its last in 1968. During that time glider construction moved decisively from wood to composites, but the open class metal Meteor was not out-classed. It was fourth in 1956 and 1958, fifth in 1965 and competed again in 1968, though only placed 27th. In 1958 the Meteor established two new international closed circuit speed records over 100 km and 300 km.

Meteor 57 appears on the Croatian civil register in 2010.

Meteor 60 YU-4103 is under reconstruction at the Museum of Aviation (Belgrade) in Serbia but is not on public display.

== Variants ==
Meteor
Original 1955 version.
Meteor 57
1957 version.
Meteor 60
1960 version: refined canopy-fuselage junction and rear fuselage.

== Specifications (Meteor 60) ==
Data from Jane's All the World's Aircraft 1960-61 The World's Sailplanes:Die Segelflugzeuge der Welt:Les Planeurs du Monde

General characteristics

- Crew: 1
- Length: 8.05 m (26 ft 5 in)
- Wingspan: 20.0 m (65 ft 7 in)
- Wing area: 16.0 m^{2} (172 sq ft)
- Aspect ratio: 25.0
- Airfoil: NACA 63_{2}-616.5
- Empty weight: 376 kg (829 lb)
- Gross weight: 505 kg (1,113 lb)
- Max takeoff weight: 505 kg (1,113 lb)

Performance

- Stall speed: 67 km/h (42 mph, 36 kn)
- Never exceed speed: 250 km/h (160 mph, 130 kn)
- Rough air speed max: 125 km/h (78 mph; 67 kn)
- Aerotow speed: 150 km/h (93 mph; 81 kn)
- Winch launch speed: 90 km/h (56 mph; 49 kn)
- Terminal velocity: with full air-brakes at max all-up weight 230 km/h (143 mph; 124 kn)
- g limits: +4 +1 at 252 km/h (157 mph; 136 kn) +5 at 153 km/h (95 mph; 83 kn) -2.5 at 144 km/h (89 mph; 78 kn)
- Maximum glide ratio: 40:1 at 90 km/h (56 mph; 49 kn)
- Rate of sink: 0.60 m/s (118 ft/min) best
- Wing loading: 31.5 kg/m^{2} (6.5 lb/sq ft)

== See also ==
Aircraft of comparable role, configuration, and era

- Slingsby Skylark 3

Related lists

- List of gliders
