= Iggulden =

Iggulden /ˈɪɡəldɛn/ is a surname. Notable people with the surname include:

- Conn Iggulden (born 1971), British author
- Mike Iggulden (born 1982), Canadian ice hockey player
