= Vanags =

Family name

Origin
- Origin: Latvian
- Meaning: "hawk"

Vanags (feminine: Vanaga) is a Latvian surname, derived from the Latvian word for "hawk". Individuals with the surname include:

- Aleksandrs Vanags (1919–1986), Latvian football and basketball player
- Aleksandrs Vanags (architect) (1873-1919), Latvian architect
- Ēriks Vanags (1892–2001), Latvian athlete
- Jānis Vanags (born 1958), Latvian archbishop
- Jūlijs Vanags (1903–1986), Latvian writer and translator
