= Ikarus Košava =

1950s Yugoslavian sailplane

Košava
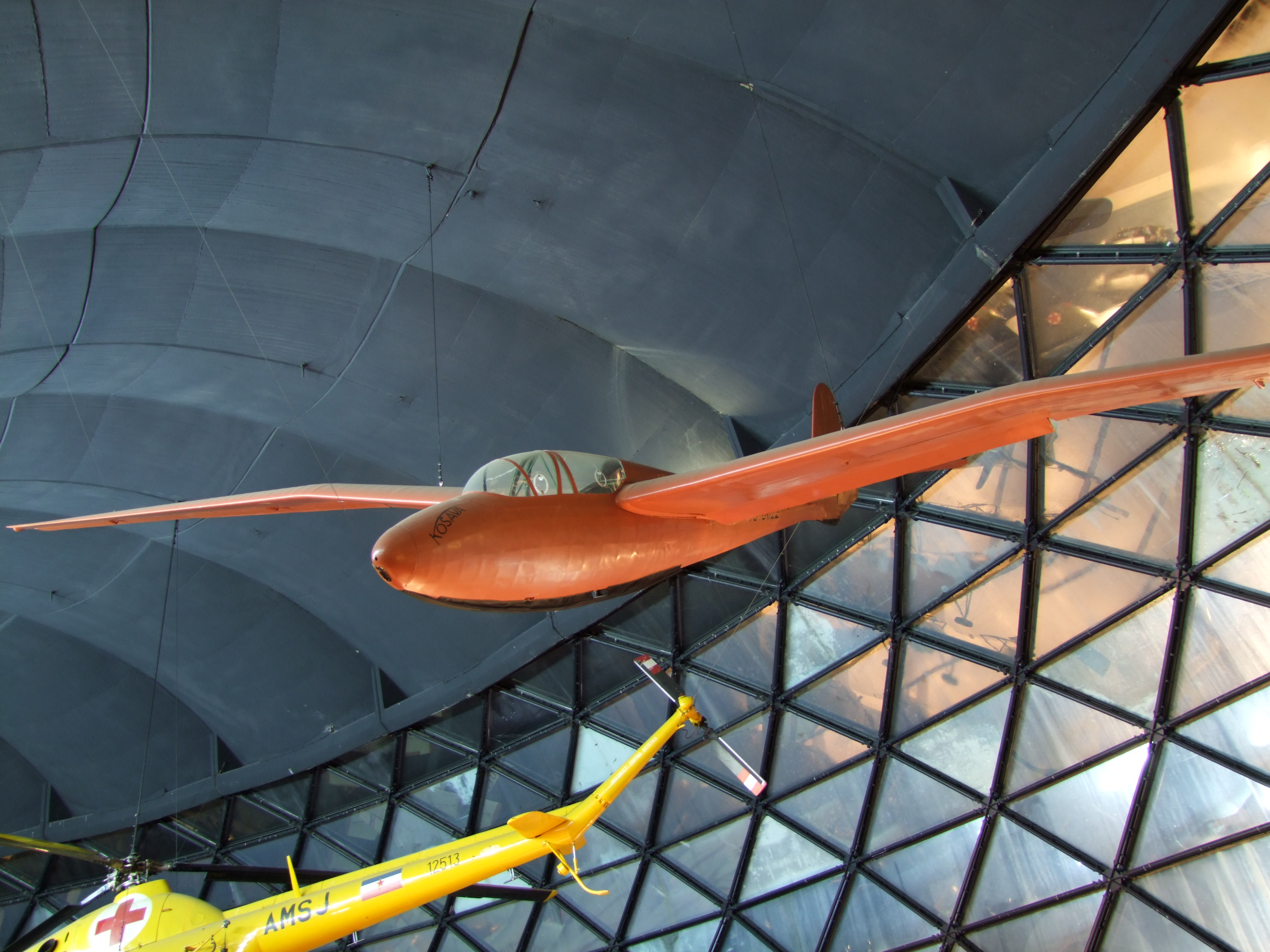
- An Ikarus Košava on display at the Belgrade Aviation Museum

General information
- Type: Two seat competition sailplane
- National origin: Yugoslavia
- Manufacturer: Ikarus
- Designer: Milos Ilic and Adrian Kisovec
- Number built: 2

History
- First flight: March 1953

The Ikarus Košava (English: North Wind) is a two-seat sailplane designed and built in Yugoslavia in the early 1950s. It won the 1954 World Gliding Championships in the two seat category and came second in the same event two years later.

== Design and development ==
The Košava was commissioned by the Yugoslavian Aeronautical Union and built at the Ikarus factory to replace the pre-World War II Kranich II aircraft. It is a wooden glider, covered in a mixture of plywood and fabric. The wings are built up around single spars, with ply covering to the leading edge forming a D- or torsion box. Behind the spar the covering is fabric. Forward sweep of 4.5° at one quarter chord allows the centre of gravity to be far enough forward to place the rear of the two tandem seats at it and the leading edge. The wing is of gull wing design, the roots at the shoulder wing position and with 7° of dihedral on the inboard 40% of span. A subsidiary spar carries plain flaps inboard, mass balanced and sealed ailerons, divided into two sections, outboard. The first prototype had a pair of under surface airbrakes on each wing but these were replaced on the second aircraft with Schempp-Hirth parallel ruler action brakes.

The flaps on the Košava could be set to downward or upward deflections. For slow fight they were lowered through either 15° or 30°. The ailerons automatically drooped when this was done: 15° of flap drooped the inner ailerons 10° and the outer ones 5°, 30° of flap produced 15° and 10° of droop. The wing section without flaps was a high camber one best suited for high lift at low speed but raising the flaps through either 6° or 9° lowered the camber. 6° increased the speed and 9° made the glider autostable in pitch, particularly valuable for blind flying in cloud.

The semi-monocoque fuselage is ply covered and oval in cross section, becoming finer and more circular towards the tail. the fixed rear surfaces were also ply covered, carrying fabric covered control surfaces. The horizontal tail has almost constant chord and is forward of the rudder, which is broad and extends down to the keel. The fuselage deepens forward, with a fixed skid for landing, aided by a tail bumper The Košava was launched on a drop-off wheeled dolly. The tandem cockpit has a long, low, level topped multi piece blown canopy which extends aft to about mid-chord where it is faired into the fuselage.

The Kosawa first flew in March 1953. (Note: Jane's All he World's Aircraft 1960/61 has the first flight in 1952)

== Operational history ==
Very soon after its first flight the Košava, flown by Božidar Komac, was engaging in competitions. After winning the Yugoslavian National Championship, it achieved third place at the first German gliding competition allowed after World War II, held at Oerlinghausen. The following year the Košava came to the UK for the World Gliding Championships (WGC) at Camphill; flown by Božidar Komac and Zvonimir Rain, it won the two seater competition by a large margin. Two years later, piloted by Rain, it was placed second in the same category at the WGC at Saint-Yan in France. It also set a world women's speed record over a closed 200 km (120 mi) course, and a Yugoslavian national distance record. It won the two seat Yugoslav national championships in 1955.

Despite its success in competition, only the two prototypes of the Košava were built.

== Variants ==
Košava
Standard long span, gull wing version.
Košava II
Wing straightened and reduced in span to 18 m (59 ft 1 in).
Košava 57
Košava variant produced in 1957
Košava 60
Košava variant produced in 1960

== Aircraft on display ==
- Košava YU-5022, the first prototype: Museum of Aviation, Belgrade

== Specifications (Košava) ==
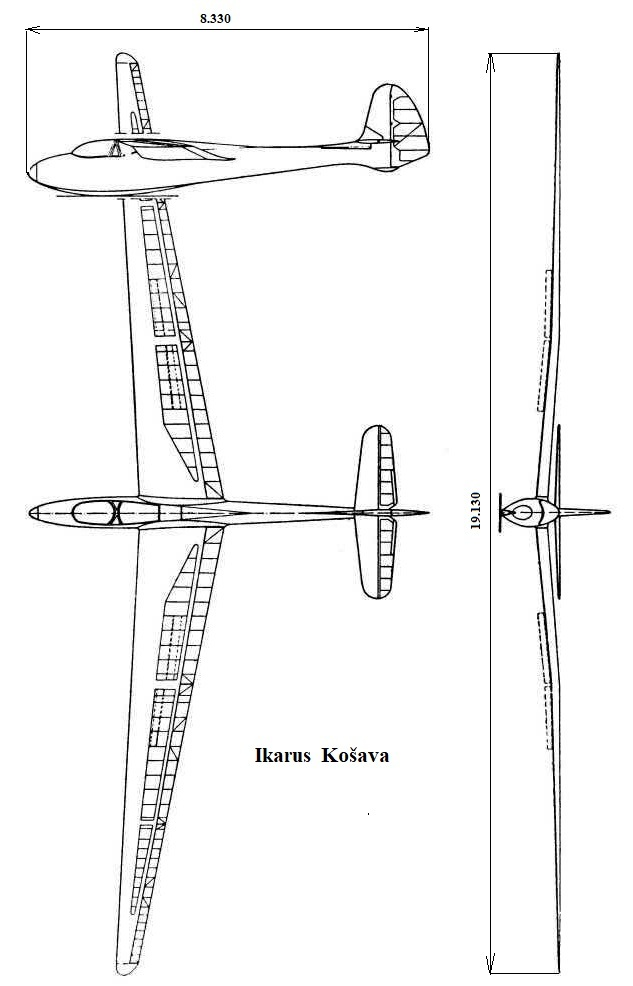
Košava

Data from Die berümtesten Segelflugzeuge The World's Sailplanes:Die Segelflugzeuge der Welt:Les Planeurs du Monde Volume II Jane's All the world's Aircraft 1960

General characteristics

- Crew: 2
- Length: 8.33 m (27 ft 4 in)
- Wingspan: 19.125 m (62 ft 9 in)
- Wing area: 21.12 m^{2} (227.3 sq ft)
- Aspect ratio: 17.3
- Airfoil: Göttingen 549, thickened near root; TsAGI 731-M at tip
- Empty weight: 370 kg (816 lb)
- Gross weight: 575 kg (1,268 lb)

Performance

- Stall speed: 57 km/h (35 mph, 31 kn)
- Never exceed speed: 220 km/h (140 mph, 120 kn)
- Aerotow speed: 130 km/h (80.8 mph; 70.2 kn)
- Winch launch speed: 90 km/h (55.9 mph; 48.6 kn)
- Terminal velocity: with full airbrakes 230 km/h (143 mph; 124 kn)
- Maximum glide ratio: 33.5 at 87 km/h (54.1 mph; 47.0 kn)
- Rate of sink: 0.66 m/s (130 ft/min) at 75 km/h (46.6 mph; 40.5 kn)
- Wing loading: 27.2 kg/m^{2} (5.6 lb/sq ft)
