= VTC Delfin =

Delfin

General information
- Type: Standard class competition glider
- National origin: Yugoslavia
- Manufacturer: VTC(Vazduhoplovno Tehnicki Centar), Vrsac
- Designer: T. Dragovic and Z. Gabrijel
- Number built: 34

History
- First flight: 7 December 1963

The VTC Delfin is a competition single seat Standard class glider designed and built in Yugoslavia in the 1960s. It had some success in national competitions and went into small scale production.

== Design and development ==
A standard class single seat sailplane with a wooden structure and largely plywood covered, the Delfin has a 15 m span (49 ft 2.5 in) shoulder mounted wing of straight tapered plan and with small tip fairings or salmons. There is 2° of dihedral. Forward of the spar the wing is wooden skinned; the first seven aircraft, the Delfin 1, use ply-foam sandwich but this was replaced with all-wood layers in the production Delfin 2. Behind the spar the covering is fabric. The Delfin 1 has metal ailerons, replaced with all-wood ones in the Delfin 2. No flaps are fitted but there are Schempp-Hirth airbrakes mounted at 60% chord.

The oval cross-section fuselage of the Delfin tapers gently to the rear to an integral fin. All Delfins were built with a fin and rudder strongly swept on both leading and trailing edges and with an all-moving tailplane, fitted with servo tabs, mounted on the fuselage. Four Delfin 2s were later modified into Delfin 3s with a more upright vertical tail and a fin-mounted fixed tailplane with conventional elevators. The Delfin cockpit is long, with the pilot seated in a semi-reclining position. On Delfin 1s, it is covered by a long, forward sliding, single piece canopy reaching almost to the nose but later marks have a shorter, starboard hinged one piece canopy, with the upper nose surface plywood skinned like the rest of the fuselage. The undercarriage consists of a fixed, unsprung, semi-protruding monowheel and a small tail bumper. A rubber spring nose skid was added to the Delfin 2.

The Delfin first flew from Vrsac in December 1963. The Delfin 2 was produced there, making its first flight on 26 April 1965. The Delfin 3 followed on 29 July 1968.

== Operational history ==
A Delfin 1 made the type's first public appearance at the World Gliding Championships of 1965, held at South Cerney in the UK. Flown by V. Stepanovic it only achieved 37th place out of 45 in the Standard Class. The Delfin was much more successful the following year in the very competitive Polish National Championship, finishing in the top two places.

== Variants ==
Data from Aerotyp Segelflugzeuge (1969) and Gliders & Sailplanes of the World (1982)

Delfin 1
Prototype and an initial batch of six. Long, forward sliding canopy extends almost to the nose. Metal ailerons.
Delfin 2
Production model, 27 built. Shorter, side opening canopy, rubber mounted nose-skid added and wooden ailerons.
Delfin 3
Much more upright fin with sweep only on leading edge. The earlier all moving, tab assisted fuselage mounted tailplane replaced by a cruciform tail with the fixed tailplane mounted well above the fuselage and carrying conventional elevators. Four modified from Delfin 2s.

== Aircraft on display ==
- Aeronautical Museum - Belgrade: Delfin 2 YU-4138

== Specifications (Delfin 1) ==
Data from Aerotyp Segelflugzeuge (1969)

General characteristics

- Crew: One
- Length: 7.20 m (23 ft 7 in)
- Wingspan: 15.00 m (49 ft 3 in)
- Wing area: 12.82 m^{2} (138.0 sq ft)
- Aspect ratio: 17.55
- Airfoil: NACA 63_{3}618, modified
- Empty weight: 215 kg (474 lb)
- Gross weight: 325 kg (717 lb)

Performance

- Stall speed: 61 km/h (38 mph, 33 kn)
- Never exceed speed: 250 km/h (160 mph, 130 kn)
- Maximum glide ratio: 33.4 at 87 km/h (54 mph; 47 kn)
- Rate of sink: 0.65 m/s (128 ft/min) minimum at 75 km/h (47 mph; 40 kn)
- Wing loading: 25.35 kg/m^{2} (5.19 lb/sq ft)
