= SVC Mačka =

Yugoslavian acrobatic glider aircraft

Mačka
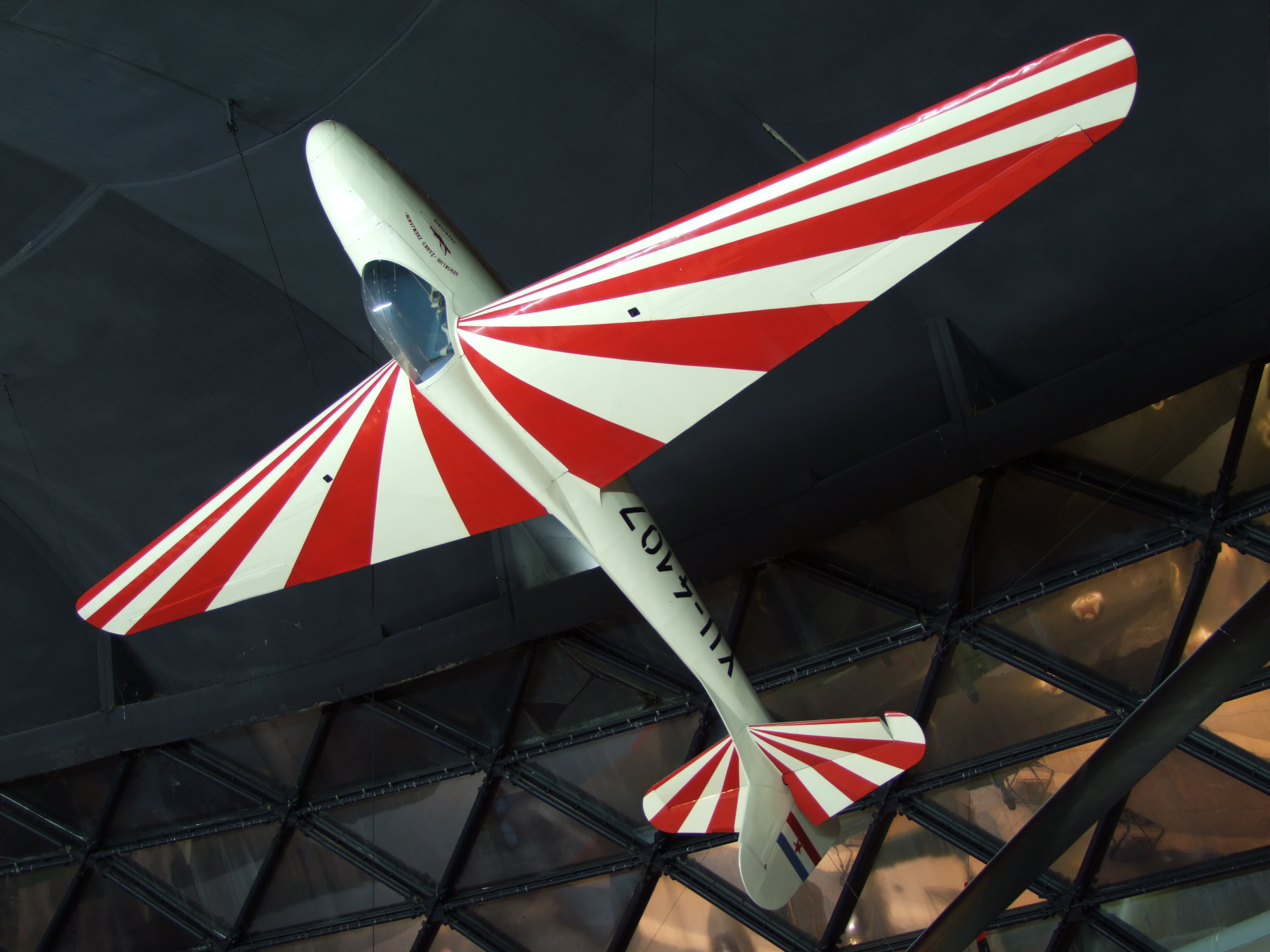
- Mačka preserved at the Belgrade Aviation Museum

General information
- Type: acrobatic glider
- National origin: Yugoslavia
- Manufacturer: Savezni Vazduhoplovni Centar (SVC)
- Designer: Miloš Ilić

History
- Introduction date: 1958
- First flight: 1956

The SVC Mačka (Serbian: мачка—"cat") was a single-seat acrobatic glider of wooden construction with undercarriage skis for landing. It was constructed and produced at Savezni Vazduhoplovni Centar (SVC) in Vršac. It was the only acrobatic glider constructed in Yugoslavia.

== Development ==
The Mačka was developed by engineer Miloš Ilić. Its prototype was made in 1956, and after testing, a small series was produced in 1958, also in Vršac. Ilić has basically copied Mačka's tail and rear fuselage from another glider, the Ilindenka.

== Production ==
Production aircraft and variants were built at SVC, LETOV (as the LETOV KBI-14 Mačka) and Ikarus (Ikarus Prva srpska industrija aeroplana, automobila i strojeva).

== Specifications (variant specified) ==
Data from

General characteristics

- Length: 5.67 m (18 ft 7 in)
- Wingspan: 10.00 m (32 ft 10 in)
- Height: 1.83 m (6 ft 0 in)
- Wing area: 10.00 m^{2} (107.6 sq ft)
- Aspect ratio: 10
- Empty weight: 160 kg (353 lb)
- Max takeoff weight: 260 kg (573 lb)

Performance

- Stall speed: 62.5 km/h (38.8 mph, 33.7 kn)
- Never exceed speed: 450 km/h (280 mph, 240 kn)
- Maximum glide ratio: 21.5 at 83 km/h (52 mph; 45 kn)
- Rate of sink: 0.98 m/s (193 ft/min) at 74.5 km/h (46.3 mph; 40.2 kn)
