= IIL IS-8 =

Two-seat sailplane

IS-8

General information
- Type: Two seat sailplane
- National origin: Romania
- Manufacturer: Intreprinderea de industrie Locală (IIL)
- Designer: Iosif Șilimon

History
- First flight: 14 September 1960

The IIL IS-8 was a two-seat sailplane designed by Iosif Șilimon and built in Romania in 1960. They served with Romanian gliding clubs.

== Design and development ==
From about 1950 to his death in February 1981, Iosif Silimon was Romania's most prominent glider designer, his aircraft distinguished by his initials. The IS-8, a two-seat shoulder wing cantilever monoplane, first flew on 14 September 1960.

Its wings had an all wood structure and were mounted with 2.5° of dihedral. They were significantly forward swept, by 7° at quarter chord, with a constant chord inner section and strongly tapered outer panels with unswept leading edges. The wings were built around a single spar with a forward, plywood skinned torsion box between it and the leading edge; behind the spar the wing was fabric covered. The tips carried the small streamlined bodies known as salmons, common at the time. The outer panels carried wooden slotted ailerons which were ply skinned but with an outer fabric covering.

The IS-8 had an ovoid cross-section metal and plywood monocoque fuselage. Its tandem two seat cockpit stretched from just behind the nose to behind the wing leading edge, enclosed by a long, smoothly contoured, three part perspex canopy. Its centre section opened to the side and the aft section to the rear. Unusually, the IS-8 had airbrakes not on the wings but on the fuselage sides under the wing, though Silimon had used this arrangement before on the pod and boom IIL IS-5 and would use it again on the IS-9 motor glider. These were rectangular, each with an area of 0.37 m^{2} (4.0 sq ft). Between the wings the fuselage depth decreased rapidly, so that aft of the trailing edge it was quite slender. The horizontal tail, mounted on top of the fuselage, was straight tapered in plan with squared tips and constructed in the same way as the ailerons. There were gaps at both ends of the elevators, between the fin at the root and between a rearwards tailplane extension at the tip. The starboard elevator carried a trim tab. The ply-skinned fin, positioned at the elevator hinge line, was narrow and mounted a fabric covered and largely straight edged unbalanced rudder which reached down to the keel.

The main landing gear was a fixed, unsprung monowheel under mid-wing, at the point where the lower fuselage curved upwards toward its more slender rear. There was also a very short rubber sprung skid under the cockpit and a tail bumper.

The IS-8 was preferred over the earlier two seat Silimon IIL IS-7 glider as a production aircraft destined for Romanian clubs because of its comparative operational economy and maintenance simplicity. Some sources state that the IS-8 was not cleared for aerobatics, others that it served Rumanian clubs as an aerobatic aircraft as well as a trainer and solo aircraft.

== Specifications ==
Data from The World's Sailplanes (1963), pp. 198–9

General characteristics

- Crew: Two
- Length: 7.35 m (24 ft 1 in)
- Wingspan: 13.35 m (43 ft 10 in)
- Wing area: 15.45 m^{2} (166.3 sq ft)
- Aspect ratio: 11.5
- Airfoil: NACA 43015 inboard, NACA 43012A tip
- Empty weight: 220 kg (485 lb) equipped
- Gross weight: 400 kg (882 lb)

Performance

- Stall speed: 62 km/h (39 mph, 33 kn)
- Never exceed speed: 180 km/h (110 mph, 97 kn) placard, smooth air
- Rough air speed max: 140 km/h (87 mph; 76 kn)
- Aerotow speed: 120 km/h (75 mph; 65 kn)
- Winch launch speed: 85 km/h (53 mph; 46 kn)
- Maximum glide ratio: best, 23:1 at 85 km/h (53 mph; 46 kn)
- Rate of sink: 0.98 m/s (193 ft/min) minimum, at 70 km/h (43 mph; 38 kn)
- Wing loading: 25.8 kg/m^{2} (5.3 lb/sq ft)
