= IIL IS-7 =

Two-seat sailplane

IS-7

General information
- Type: Two seat sailplane
- National origin: Romania
- Manufacturer: Intreprinderea de industrie Locală (IIL)
- Designer: Iosif Șilimon
- Number built: 1

History
- First flight: 7 May 1959

The IIL IS-7 was a two-seat, sailplane designed by Iosif Șilimon and built in Romania in the late 1950s. Only one prototype was built.

== Design and development ==
From about 1950 to his death in February 1981, Iosif Șilimon was Romania's most prominent glider designer, his aircraft distinguished by his initials. The IS-7, a two-seat high wing cantilever monoplane, first flew on 7 May 1959. Its wings had an all wood structure and were mounted with 3.5° of dihedral. They were straight tapered in plan, with a slightly forward swept leading edge and a quarter chord forward sweep of 6°, built around a single spar with a forward, plywood skinned torsion box between it and the leading edge; behind the spar the wing was fabric covered. The tips carried the small streamlined bodies known as salmons, common at the time. Its slotted ailerons, which filled about half the span and were divided into two pairs, were ply skinned but with an outer fabric covering. Spoilers, situated immediately inboard of the ailerons at about 40% chord, opened both above and below the wing.

The IS-7 had an ovoid cross-section plywood monocoque fuselage. Its tandem two seat cockpit stretched from the extreme nose to behind the wing leading edge, enclosed by a long, two part perspex canopy following the lines of the fuselage. The longer forward part opened to the side and the short aft section to the rear. Behind the wing the fuselage tapered to the tail. The horizontal tail was straight tapered in plan with squared tips, raised a little above the fuselage on a fin fillet and constructed in the same way as the ailerons. There were gaps at both ends of the elevators, between the fin at the root and between a rearwards tailplane extension at the tip. The elevators carried trim tabs. The ply-skinned fin and fabric, unbalanced rudder were straight edged, the latter reaching down to the keel.

The IS-7 had a short, rubber sprung skid under the cockpit and a fixed, unsprung monowheel under the wing, fitted with a brake. There was also a small tail skid.

The IS-7 was classed as semi-aerobatic. Development of it ceased when it was decided that the IIL IS-8, another Silimon designed two seater but with a smaller span, would be operationally simpler and more economical to run.

== Specifications ==
Data from The World's Sailplanes (1963), pp.196-7

General characteristics

- Crew: One
- Length: 8.65 m (28 ft 5 in)
- Wingspan: 15.0 m (49 ft 3 in)
- Wing area: 19.7 m^{2} (212 sq ft)
- Aspect ratio: 12.85
- Airfoil: NACA 43015 inboard, NACA 43012A tip
- Empty weight: 318 kg (701 lb) equipped
- Gross weight: 500 kg (1,102 lb)

Performance

- Stall speed: 56 km/h (35 mph, 30 kn)
- Never exceed speed: 230 km/h (140 mph, 120 kn) placard, smooth air
- Rough air speed max: 180 km/h (112 mph; 97 kn)
- Aerotow speed: 120 km/h (75 mph; 65 kn)
- Winch launch speed: 90 km/h (56 mph; 49 kn)
- Maximum glide ratio: best, 24.5:1 at 80 km/h (50 mph; 43 kn)
- Rate of sink: 0.85 m/s (167 ft/min) minimum, at 70 km/h (43 mph; 38 kn)
- Wing loading: 25.5 kg/m^{2} (5.2 lb/sq ft)
