= Cijan-Obad Orao =

Competition single seat sailplane designed in Yugoslavia

Orao
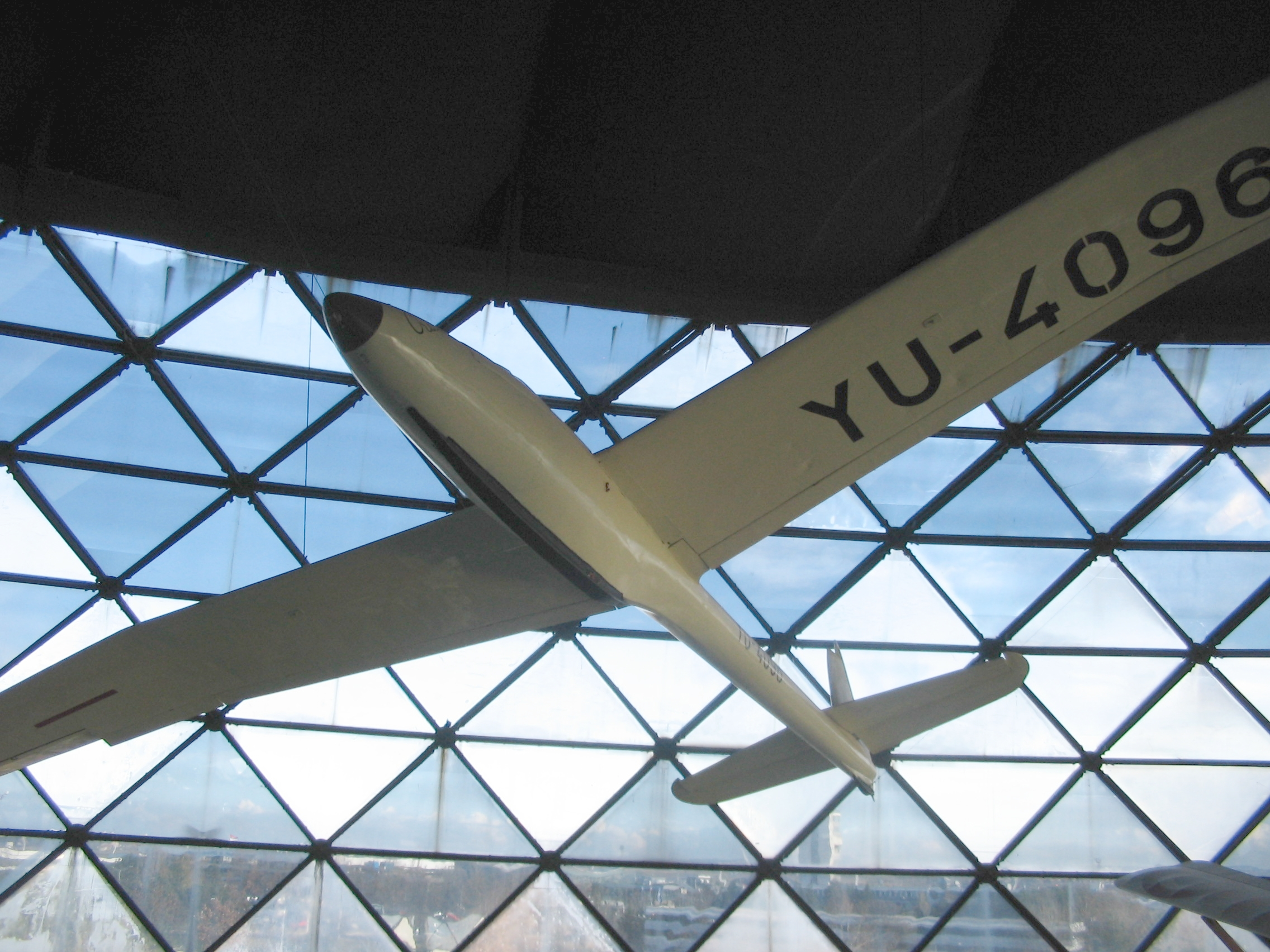
- Orao IIC

General information
- Type: Single seat competition sailplane
- National origin: Yugoslavia
- Designer: Boris Cijan and Stanko Obad
- Number built: at least 3

History
- First flight: 1948

The Cijan-Obad Orao (English: Eagle) is a competition single seat sailplane designed in Yugoslavia just after World War II, one of the most advanced of its type at the time. It flew in three World Gliding Championships, having greatest success at its first in 1950 when it reached third place.

== Design and development ==
For a time soon after World War II Yugoslavia was a leader in gliding flight and glider design. Many interesting sailplanes were designed and built. Of these the Orao II is the best known, representing "a pinnacle of sailplane design when it first flew in 1948".

The Orao II is a cantilever, shoulder wing monoplane chiefly built of wood with plywood and fabric covering but with a slightly forward swept light alloy spar. It is a gull wing, with dihedral only on the inboard section where the leading edge is parallel to the spar and the trailing edge tapers towards it. Over most of the wing the profile is Göttingen 549R, a revision of the much used Göttingen 549 airfoil, the R indicating a reflexed, camber reduced trailing edge. Outboard the leading edge also tapers towards the spar, giving it sweepback, ending in semi-elliptical tips. The composite construction of the wing around the spar was completely new to sailplane construction; wooden extensions of the spar were bonded to it; wing ribs were riveted to the spa via metal brackets. According to Simons the wing and control surfaces were entirely plywood covered but Jane's All the World's Aircraft 1952-53 says that ply was only used ahead of the spar, with fabric covering aft.

The wing trailing edge is filled by control surfaces, with Fowler flaps on the inboard sections then ailerons divided into three sections, first plain, then Frise and a short tip region. There are Schempp-Hirth parallel ruler action airbrakes immediately behind the spar on the inner part of the outer panels.

The fuselage is an early pod and boom design, with an oval section forward section formed by longerons and frames with ply covering. The pilot sits in a semi-reclined position, his head forward of and above the wings, under a two-piece, removable canopy. Aft of the wings the fuselage is a monocoque, skinned with stringers and balsa filling sandwiched between two ply sheets over wooden hoops. The tailplane is conventional, the fin constructed as part of the fuselage and ply covered. The fabric covered rudder is broad and extends down to the bottom of the fuselage where there is a sprung tail skid. The tailplane is ply covered with a swept leading edge and carries fabric covered elevators with a wide cut-out for rudder movement. The Orao lands on a rubber sprung skid.

The Orao, originally without a type number, first flew in 1948. After the national championships it underwent some small modifications, chiefly the removal of dihedral from the tailplane, to become the Orao II. After the tailboom failed catastrophically during a demonstration flight in 1950, killing the pilot, the Orao was seriously redesigned into the Orao IIC. The wing plan was unaffected but the airfoil section of the outer panels was thinned from Göttingen 549 to 682. Longer span, shorter chord plain flaps replaced the Fowler flaps and the ailerons were simplified, retaining only the outer pair. There were two suspected causes of the tail failure; the effect of repeated landing shocks and possible tail flutter. The fuselage underside was reshaped to distribute landing loads better and the fin was increased in area with a shallow dorsal fillet. The horizontal tail was made narrower, with straight taper and all ply covered, placed far enough forward so no rudder cut out in the now horn balanced elevators was required. The canopy was lengthened and made as a single piece of better aerodynamic form. Twin shoulder release hooks, placed just behind the wing leading edge, were added for Y-end towlines. The modifications added about 50 kg (110 lb) to the empty Orao IIC; the improved aerodynamics raised the glide ratio from about 32:1 to 36:1.

== Operational history ==
In 1949 the Orao attended its first competition, the Yugoslavian National Championships, where Milan Borisek set a new Yugoslav distance record of almost 600 km (373 mi) from Subotica to Salonika in Greece. After being modified into the Orao II it went to the World Gliding Championships (WGC) held at Örebro in Sweden the following year. Despite the Orao's lack of refined finishing compared with the best Weihes present, with unsealed ailerons and flaps and a lack of surface polish, and despite the lack of experience of the pilot, whose first international competition it was, the Orao came third. Its appearance and performance attracted much attention and prompted supervised comparative tests, without the WGC, of the Orao with the Weihe of Paul MacCready. These showed the two aircraft performed similarly at low speed but that the Orao had the lower sink rate at higher speeds.

Borisek was killed in the 1950 accident. Two Oraos IICs flew in the 1954 WGC, held at Camphill in the UK, but their highest placing was ninth. One also competed at the next WGC, held at Saint-Yan, France in 1956 but without success, coming in twenty-third.

== Variants ==
Data from Sailplanes 1945-1965

Orao
Prototype.
Orao II
Minor changes; chiefly the removal of dihedral from the tailplane.
Orao IIC
Major modifications to ailerons, flaps, lower fuselage shape, canopy and empennage. At least 2 built.

== Aircraft on display ==
- Orao IIC YU-4096: Museum of Aviation, Belgrade

== Specifications (Orao II) ==
Data from Jane's All the World's Aircraft 1952-53 The World's Sailplanes:Die Segelflugzeuge der Welt:Les Planeurs du Monde

General characteristics

- Crew: 1
- Length: 7.745 m (25 ft 5 in)
- Wingspan: 19.0 m (62 ft 4 in)
- Height: 1.0 m (3 ft 3 in)
- Wing area: 17.79 m^{2} (191.5 sq ft)
- Aspect ratio: 20.3
- Airfoil: Göttingen 549 - root, Göttingen 682 - mid, RAF34 - tip
- Empty weight: 356 kg (785 lb)
- Max takeoff weight: 455 kg (1,003 lb)

Performance

- Stall speed: 63.4 km/h (39.4 mph, 34.2 kn) without flaps
- Never exceed speed: 220 km/h (140 mph, 120 kn)
- Rough air speed max: 150 km/h (93 mph; 81 kn)
- Aerotow speed: 150 km/h (93 mph; 81 kn)
- Winch launch speed: 100 km/h (62 mph; 54 kn)
- Terminal velocity: with full air-brakes at max all-up weight 220 km/h (137 mph; 119 kn)
- g limits: +5 +1 at 220 km/h (137 mph; 119 kn) +5 at 128 km/h (80 mph; 69 kn) -2.75 at 184 km/h (114 mph; 99 kn)
- Maximum glide ratio: 1:36 at 85 km/h (53 mph; 46 kn)
- Rate of sink: 0.6 m/s (120 ft/min) at 75 km/h (47 mph; 40 kn)
- Wing loading: 23.8 kg/m^{2} (4.9 lb/sq ft)
