= Ilić Ilindenka =

Ilindenka 1

General information
- Type: single seat, high performance, standard class sailplane
- National origin: Yugoslavia
- Manufacturer: 20 May, Ivo Lola Ribar '43, Skopje
- Designer: Miloš Ilić
- Number built: 3+

History
- First flight: 1953

The Ilić Ilindenka was a series of Yugoslavian standard class sailplanes capable of aerobatics.

== Design ==
The single seat, standard class (15 m (49 ft 3 in)) span) Ilindenka was, like most of its contemporaries, an all-wood sailplane. It had a cantilever, twin spar, shoulder wing with plywood skin around its leading edge ahead of the forward spar. The wing was trapezoidal in plan, with taper on both edges, and set with 2.5° of dihedral. Ailerons occupied about half the trailing edges and Schemp-Hirth type spoilers were mounted at 40% chord. Each wing was braced by a thin strut between rear spar and lower fuselage.

The Ilindenka had an oval section, ply-skinned forward fuselage, becoming more rectangular aft. Its cockpit was at the wing leading edge, under a single piece canopy with a fairing behind it which fell away into the upper rear fuselage. Its tall fin was rounded in profile, with a horn balanced rudder of similar area. Its tailplane was mounted well forward on the fin just above the fuselage and carried elevators of similar area to it.

It landed on a skid under the forward fuselage.

== Variants ==
Ilindenka 1
Ilindenka 1T
Ilindenka 2

== Operational history ==
The Iindenka first flew in 1953 and was certified to fly loops, rolls and spins. Production numbers are not known but the Airforce Museum in Belgrade holds two examples, though neither was on display in 2009. Photographs show another, earlier example and one with a later registration identified as an Ilindenka 2. Externally, the latter shows little difference from the Ilindenka 1 but there is little information on this variant.

One Ilindenka, flown by Zvonimir Rain, was one of two Yugoslavian Standard Class contestants at the 1958 World Soaring Championships, held in Poland. Rain placed 12th out of 24 and Wasilije Stepanovic placed 8th in his Ilindenka.

== Specifications (Ilindenka 1) ==
Data from The World's Sailplanes

General characteristics

- Crew: one
- Wingspan: 15.16 m (49 ft 9 in)
- Wing area: 14.2 m^{2} (153 sq ft)
- Aspect ratio: 16.2
- Airfoil: Göttingen Gö 549-M (root), TsAGI 731-M (tip)
- Empty weight: 187 kg (412 lb)

197 kg (434 lb) equipped

- Max takeoff weight: 310 kg (683 lb)

Performance

- Maximum speed: 230 km/h (140 mph, 120 kn) terminal velocity air brakes open
- Never exceed speed: 230 km/h (140 mph, 120 kn)
- g limits:

- +5.6 at 52.4 km/h (32.6 mph; 28.3 kn)
- +5.7 at 74 km/h (46.0 mph; 40.0 kn)
- +1 at 230 km/h (142.9 mph; 124.2 kn) (V_{NE})
- -2.85 at 102 km/h (63.4 mph; 55.1 kn)

- Maximum glide ratio: 27.5 at 75 km/h (47 mph; 40 kn)
- Rate of sink: 0.70 m/s (138 ft/min) min.at 66.5 km/h (41.3 mph; 35.9 kn)
- Wing loading: 21.8 kg/m^{2} (4.5 lb/sq ft) max.
