= List of gliders =

This is a list of gliders/sailplanes of the world, (this reference lists all gliders with references, where available) Note: Any aircraft can glide for a short time, but gliders are designed to glide for longer.

== By nationality ==
- List of American gliders
- List of Argentine gliders
- List of Australian gliders
- List of Austrian gliders
- List of Belgian gliders
- List of Brazilian gliders
- List of British gliders
- List of Bulgarian gliders
- List of Canadian gliders
- List of Chinese gliders
- List of Czechoslovak gliders
- List of Danish gliders
- List of Dutch gliders
- List of Finnish gliders
- List of French gliders
- List of German gliders
- List of Greek gliders
- List of Hungarian gliders
- List of Indian gliders
- List of Iranian gliders
- List of Irish gliders
- List of Italian gliders
- List of Japanese gliders
- List of Latvian gliders
- List of Lithuanian gliders
- List of New Zealand gliders
- List of Philippines gliders
- List of Polish gliders
- List of Portuguese gliders
- List of Romanian gliders
- List of Russian/USSR gliders
- List of Slovenian gliders
- List of South African gliders
- List of Spanish gliders
- List of Swedish gliders
- List of Swiss gliders
- List of Turkish gliders
- List of Ukrainian gliders
- List of Yugoslavian gliders
