= List of Romanian gliders =

This is a list of Romanian gliders and sailplanes. Any aircraft can glide for a short time, but gliders are designed to glide for longer.

== Romanian miscellaneous constructors ==
=== Post-WWII aircraft factories ===
- CIL - (Complex Industrializarea Lemnului - Reghin)
- URMV-3 - (Uzinele de Reparații Material Volant-3 – Brașov)
- ICA-Brașov - (Intreprinderea de Construcții Aeronautice - Brașov)
- IFIL - (Întreprinderea Forestieră de Industrializare a Lemnului)
- IIL - (Întreprinderea de Industrie Locală- Ghimbav)
- IAR - (Industria Aeronautică Română)

=== Gliders ===
- August 1909 glider – (Henry August)
- Popiou GEP
- Manicatide RM-10
- ICAR 1 – Primary
- Kasprzyk Salamandra
- Popa OP-1 – (Ovidiu Popa)
- Popa OP-22 – (Ovidiu Popa)
- A Vlaicu glider
- Costăchescu CT-2 COSTĂCHESCU, Traian
- Giuncu-Popa GP-2 GIUNCU, Octavian & POPA, Ovidiu, manufacturer Atelierele de Reparații Material Volant - ARMV-2, Pipera, Bucarest
- CIL Reghin Albatros – Vladimir Novițchi
- IFIL-Reghin RG-4 Pionier – Vladimir Novițchi
- IFIL-Reghin RG-5 Pescăruș – Vladimir Novițchi
- URMV-3 IS-2 – Iosif Șilimon
- URMV-3 IS-3 – Iosif Șilimon
- IIL IS-4 – Iosif Șilimon
- IIL IS-5 – Iosif Șilimon
- IIL IS-7 – Iosif Șilimon
- IIL IS-8 – Iosif Șilimon
- IIL IS-10 – Iosif Șilimon
- IIL IS-11 – Iosif Șilimon
- IIL IS-12 – Iosif Șilimon
- ICA IS-28 – Iosif Șilimon
- ICA IS-29 – Iosif Șilimon
- ICA IS-32 – Iosif Șilimon
- ICA IAR-35
