= Cavok =

CAVOK or Cavok may refer to:

- CAVOK (aviation), an abbreviation for Ceiling and Visibility OK, used in METARs
- CAVOK Air, a Ukrainian cargo airline established in 2011
- Hatherleigh CAVOK, a motorglider
