= URMV-3 IS-4 =

IS-4

General information
- Type: Sailplane
- National origin: Romania
- Manufacturer: URMV-3
- Designer: Iosif Şilimon

History
- First flight: 5 June 1959
- Developed from: URMV-3 IS-3d

The IS-4 was a high performance glider designed by Iosif Şilimon and built in Romania in the late 1950s at the URMV-3 (Rom: Uzinele de Reparatii Material Volant-3 - Glider repair and manufacture factory) factory at Braşov.

== Design and development ==
The IS-4 high-performance glider followed the layout of the earlier IS-3d, constructed largely of wood with plywood and fabric skinning. The high-set cantilever wings with moderate dihedral (2º 30') were built with a single main spar with a plywood covered leading edge torsion box. The ovoid section fuselage was of monocoque construction with plywood skin with a streamlined full-length cockpit canopy forward of the wings. The undercarriage consisted of a balloon main-wheel with nose and tail skids. Flying controls were largely conventional with plywood skinned fixed portions and fabric covered wooden built up movable surfaces. Pitch trim was achieved by a trim tab on the elevators and adverse yaw was alleviated through the use of differential ailerons.

Very little is known of the IS-4s development or operational history.

== Specifications (IS-4) ==
Data from The World's Sailplanes:Die Segelflugzeuge der Welt:Les Planeurs du Monde Volume II

General characteristics

- Crew: 1
- Length: 7.1 m (23 ft 4 in)
- Wingspan: 15 m (49 ft 3 in)
- Height: 0.9 m (2 ft 11 in) at cockpit
- Wing area: 14 m^{2} (150 sq ft)
- Aspect ratio: 16
- Airfoil: Root:Göttingen 549, Mid Göttingen 549, Tip Göttingen 693
- Empty weight: 210 kg (463 lb)
- Gross weight: 320 kg (705 lb)

Performance

- Stall speed: 60 km/h (37 mph, 32 kn)
- Never exceed speed: 200 km/h (120 mph, 110 kn) *Rough air speed max: 150 km/h (93 mph; 81 kn)
- Aerotow speed: 120 km/h (75 mph; 65 kn)
- Winch launch speed: 90 km/h (56 mph; 49 kn)
- Terminal velocity: with full air-brakes at max all-up weight 185 km/h (115 mph; 100 kn)
- g limits: +5 -3 at 250 km/h (135.0 kn)
- Maximum glide ratio: 30 at 80 km/h (50 mph; 43 kn)
- Rate of sink: 0.64 m/s (126 ft/min) at 41.6 mph; 36.2 kn (67 km/h)
- Wing loading: 22.9 kg/m^{2} (4.7 lb/sq ft)

== See also ==
Aircraft of comparable role, configuration, and era Grunau Baby Related lists List of gliders
