= List of Swiss gliders =

This is a list of gliders/sailplanes of the world, (this reference lists all gliders with references, where available) Note: Any aircraft can glide for a short time, but gliders are designed to glide for longer.

== Swiss miscellaneous constructors ==
- Ae.C.S. Zögling Aero-Club Suisse
- Aecherli HAFA-9 AECHERLI, Hermann
- Aecherli Pfau 7 AECHERLI, Hermann & FARN...
- Aecherli Pfau – Hermann Aecherli & Willy Farner
- Amstutz Thun – E. Amstutz, H. Belart & H. von Travel, Bern
- Amstutz Thun BLASER & LERGIER, L.
- Caps I
- Chardon Biplan 1922 – Francis Chardon – Switzerland
- Chardon Biplan 1922 CHARDON, Francis
- Chardon Monoplan 1922 – Francis Chardon – Switzerland
- Chardon Monoplan 1922 CHARDON, Francis
- Cosandey Pou Planeur – Swiss – Louis Cosandey
- Cosandey Pou Planeur COSANDEY, Louis
- Domenjoz Planeur-Voilier
- Drückspatz II
- EFF Prometheus I
- EFF Prometheus II
- EFW N-20.01 – Eidgenössische Flugzeugwerke Emmen
- Elsässer Röbi ELSÄSSER, E. & OBRECHT,...
- F+W N-20.1 WIEHL, Herbert
- FFA Diamant 18 BIRCHER, Thomas & Von VO...
- FFA Diamant – Flug- und Fahrzeugwerke Altenrhein AG variants HBV, Diamant 16.5, Diamant 18
- Flachsmann F-1 FLACHSMANN, Karl
- Flachsmann F-2 FLACHSMANN, Karl
- GBMZ Zögling
- GBMZ Zögling HUG, August
- Guignard 1934 GUIGNARD, Donat
- Guignard Chanute – Donat Guignard
- Hatherleigh CAVOK
- HBV Diamant BIRCHER, Thomas & Von VO...
- Hütter H-30 TS HÜTTER, Ulrich
- Jenni 1931 glider
- Jenni 1931
- Ka-Bi-Vo – Federal Institute of Technology – (Eidgenössische Technische Hochschule Zürich)
- Kopp Ko III
- Liwentaal Aerostat – Alexandre Liwentaal
- Lost (glider) – Jakob Spalinger & Fritz Stamer & Alexander Lippisch – Martin & Hessel
- Müller M-2 – K. Müller
- OVL Austria – Fritz Müller – Ostschweizer Verein für Luftfahrt e. V., Zürich
- OVL Zurivogel – Fritz Müller – Ostschweizer Verein für Luftfahrt e. V., Zürich
- OVL Zurivogel MÜLLER, Fritz
- Pilatus B-4 – Pilatus Aircraft
- Robi (glider) – Elsaesser, Obrecht & Huegli
- Ruppert Archaeopteryx – Ruppert Composite GmbH
- Scherler HS-1 – Hermann Scherler and SG Biel
- Scherler HS-1 SCHERLER, Hermann
- Spengler HS3 Skikarus – Hans Spengler
- Studer WS-1 Habicht – Walter Studer
- Studer-Sägesser WS-1 Lilli
- Studer-Sägesser WS-1 – Walter Studer & Rudolf Sägesser
- Thuner-Gleiter – A. Haefli & L. Lergier
- Vetterli Sperber – Ernst Vetterli
- Vol-au-Vent (glider) – Club genevois d'aviation 1910
- Vol-au-Vent
- WLM-1 – Rudolf Sägesser- Isler & Co, Wildegg
- WLM-1 SÄGESSER, Rudolf
- WLM-2 – WLM Flugingenieure – H. Sägesser, Flugzeugbbau, Herzogenbuchsee
- WLM-2 WLM Flugingenieure
- Zaunkönig (glider) – Karl Huber & Ernst Schmid
- Zögling Ae.C.S. – Aero-Club Suisse
