= Marsden Gemini =

Canadian glider

Gemini

General information
- Type: Glider
- National origin: Canada
- Designer: David Marsden
- Status: unknown
- Number built: one

History
- First flight: 1973

The Marsden Gemini is a Canadian mid-wing, T-tailed, two-seats in side-by-side configuration, experimental research glider that was designed and constructed by David Marsden at the University of Alberta, first flying in 1973.

== Design and development ==
The Gemini was designed to explore the use of flaps to create a variable geometry sailplane that would be optimized for both low speed thermalling flight and also high speed gliding between thermals.

The aircraft was predominantly made from aluminium, with some stainless steel used for the wing ribs, controls and fittings. The two-place side-by-side cockpit was made from fibreglass. Its four-piece 60.75 ft (18.5 m) span high aspect ratio wing employed a modified Wortmann FX-61-163/35SF airfoil. The Fowler flaps occupied the entire trailing edge of the wing and accounted for 35% of the wing chord. In cruise the flaps were retracted, reducing the wing area. While climbing, the flaps were extended, producing a high lift coefficient of 2.2. For glidepath control when landing the flaps deployed to 80° to create aerodynamic drag. The outer flaps acted as slotted ailerons for roll control.

== Operational history ==
Only one Gemini was built. The aircraft was still operational in August 2011, owned by William G. Osoba of Wichita, Kansas, United States, but was removed from the US register in April 2019 and its fate is unknown.

The aircraft was flown to set seven Canadian multi-place records, including the record for speed over a 500 km (311 mi) triangle. It was also used to set the US national record for the 300 km (186 mi) of 94 mph (151 km/h).

On July 2, 2011, Osoba and his wife Christine flew the Gemini on a 565 mi (909 km) free distance flight from Zapata, Texas to just east of Amarillo, Texas, a flight which won the 2011 Barringer Trophy.

== Specifications (Gemini) ==
Data from Sailplane Directory

General characteristics

- Crew: one
- Capacity: one passenger
- Wingspan: 60 ft 8 in (18.49 m)
- Wing area: 124 sq ft (11.5 m^{2}) with flaps retracted
- Aspect ratio: 29.8:1
- Airfoil: modified Wortmann FX-61-163/35SF
- Empty weight: 785 lb (356 kg)
- Gross weight: 1,240 lb (562 kg)

Performance

- Maximum glide ratio: 40:1 at 74 mph (119 km/h)
- Rate of sink: 124 ft/min (0.63 m/s)
- Wing loading: 10 lb/sq ft (49 kg/m^{2})

== See also ==
Other gliders with Fowler flaps

- Beatty-Johl BJ-2 Assegai
- LET L-13 Blaník
- Sigma
- SZD Zefir series

Related lists

- List of gliders
