= Operation Sigma Sigma =

British single-seat glider, 1971

Sigma

General information
- Type: Open class sailplane
- National origin: United Kingdom
- Manufacturer: Operation Sigma Ltd
- Designer: John Sellars
- Status: still flying
- Number built: 2

History
- First flight: 12 September 1971

The Sigma is an experimental glider developed in Britain from 1966 by a team led by Nicholas Goodhart. After disappointing performance during flight testing the Sigma was passed on to a Canadian group which carried out modifications, making the Sigma more competitive.

== Design and development ==
Designed to compete in the 1970 World Gliding Championships, the team aimed to develop a wing that would climb well through a high lift coefficient and a large wing area, but equally had the "maximum possible reduction of area for cruise at low lift coefficients". At the same time for the minimum possible drag they aimed for "extensive" laminar flow. To achieve this they employed flaps that would alter both wing area and wing camber. Based on analysis of the nature of thermals encountered in cross-country flying, they reasoned that by having a slow turning circle, their sailplane could stay close to the central (and strongest) part of the thermal and gain maximum benefit.

Its unusual feature is its ability to vary its wing area using Fowler flaps. It had been tried before by the Hannover Akaflieg in 1938 with their AFH-4, the South African Beatty-Johl BJ-2 Assegai and the SZD Zefir gliders.

Operation Sigma Ltd. was formed, attracting sponsorship from Hawker Siddeley and assistance from eminent aerodynamicists, and construction of a prototype was started at the Slingsby Kirbymoorside factory. A fire at the Slingsby factory in 1968 destroyed the prototype, which was nearing completion. Slingsby Sailplanes Ltd. soon went into receivership after the disastrous fire so the remaining prototype Sigma Type C was relocated to the British European Airways workshops at London Heathrow Airport (LHR). After completion it eventually flew for the first time on 12 September 1971 at the College of Aeronautics, Cranfield.

The wings and tail boom are of aluminum alloy construction and the front of the fuselage is glass-fibre composite, with a welded steel tube centre-section connecting the fuselage components and wings. Other equipment fitted include a retractable main wheel, speed limiting air brakes and a tail parachute housed in a compartment in the rudder.

The hydraulically actuated flaps increased the wing area to 177 square feet (an increase of 35%), lowering the wing loading and stalling speed (37 knots), allowing the desired tight circling when thermalling. The hydraulic pressure needed to move the flaps was provided by the pilot pumping on the rudder pedals, this proving to be tiring, not to mention that moving the flaps in flight was found to be almost impossible due to bending in the wings. Performance testing revealed a disappointing best L/D of 41:1 and the project was wound up in 1977.

The group offered the Sigma up to further development by other parties, selecting a proposal by David Marsden a professor of mechanical engineering at the University of Alberta (on sabbatical at Cranfield Institute of Technology and a glider pilot holding records with his own glider designs such as the Marsden Gemini).

The aircraft was moved to Canada in 1979 by Marsden, modified with a new flap system, conventional ailerons in lieu of outboard flap sections and the tail parachute was removed from the rudder. Despite the glide ratio only increasing to 47:1, its good climb rate made it competitive with contemporary Open Class gliders of the time, breaking the US 300 km triangle record in 1997 at 151 km/h (82 kn).

== Variants ==
Data from:British Gliders and Sailplanes 1922-1970

Sigma Type A
This version was under construction at the Slingsby factory at Kirbymoorside in 1969 when they were completely destroyed in the 1969 Slingsby factory fire.
Sigma Type B
A version differing in detail from the Type A, not completed.
Sigma Type C
After the fire the project was taken on by Operation Sigma Ltd., ostensibly to supply a world beating sailplane for the World Gliding Championships. Of similar outline, shape and size to the original prototypes, the Type C was completely revised in detail, but retained the construction methods of the earlier aircraft.
(Marsden) Sigma
The Sigma after modification in Canada by David Marsden.

== Specifications (before Marsden conversion) ==
Data from Sailplanes 1965-2000

General characteristics

- Crew: 1
- Length: 28 ft 11 in (8.81 m)
- Wingspan: 68 ft 11 in (21 m)
- Wing area: 131 sq ft (12.2 m^{2}) (flaps retracted)

16.5 m^{2} (177.60 sq ft) (flaps extended)

- Aspect ratio: 36.2(flaps retracted)

26.8 (flaps extended)

- Airfoil: Wortmann FX-67-Σ136-017
- Empty weight: 1,338 lb (607 kg)
- Max takeoff weight: 1,550 lb (703 kg)

Performance

- Maximum glide ratio: 41:1 as completed (47:1 with Marsden modifications)
- Rate of sink: 126.6 ft/min (0.643 m/s) (1.25 kts)(flaps retracted)

151 ft/min (1.5 kts) (0.772 m/s) (flaps extended)

- Wing loading: 11.8 lb/sq ft (57.6 kg/m^{2}) (flaps retracted)

42.6 kg/m^{2} (8.725 Lb/sqft) (flaps extended)
