= Flight 343 =

Flight 343 may refer to:

- Air France Flight 343, crashed on 29 August 1960
- Aeroflot Flight 343, crashed on 29 September 1982
- Wuhan Airlines Flight 343, crashed on June 22, 2000
- KLM Flight 343 which had an incident on December 23rd, 1987
