= SC 430 =

SC 430, SC430, or SC-430 may refer to:

- Konig SC 430 aircraft engine
- Lexus SC 430 automobile
- Santa Catarina SC-430, a highway in Brazil
- South Carolina Highway 430, a highway in the United States
