= Alpaero Sirius =

French single-seat motor glider, 1984

Sirius

General information
- Type: Motor glider
- National origin: France
- Manufacturer: Alpaero
- Designer: Claude Noin
- Status: Production completed
- Number built: 20 (1998)

History
- First flight: August 1984

The Alpaero Sirius, also called the Noin Sirius, is a French high-wing, strut-braced, pod-and-boom, cruciform tail, single-seat motor glider that was designed by Claude Noin and produced by his company, Alpaero of Châteauvieux, Hautes-Alpes. It was available as plans for amateur construction and also as a kit, but has been discontinued.

== Design and development ==
Named for the star, the prototype Sirius was made from wood, tube and aircraft fabric and first flew in August 1984. The prototype had an 11 m (36.1 ft) wingspan.

The production Sirius fuselage is predominantly made from fibreglass, with wooden bulkheads. The 13.4 m (44.0 ft) span tapered wing has a wooden spar and Styrofoam wing ribs reinforced with fibreglass and features air brakes on the top surface for glidepath control. The wing's leading edge is fabricated from hot-wire cut foam, laminated with fibreglass. The wing and rudder are fabric covered. The fixed landing gear is a centre-line bicycle gear, with auxiliary wing tip and tail wheels. The main wheel has a drum brake. The 18 kW (24 hp) König SC 430 engine, or alternatively the 13.5 kW (18 hp) JPX D-320 engine, is mounted behind the cockpit and beneath the tail boom in pusher configuration and features a propeller guard plate just behind the main wheel. The propeller is a fixed pitch two-bladed design with small diameter. The cockpit width is 53 cm (21 in) and the best glide ratio is 23:1.

In 1998 the design was available as plans for US$220 or as a kit for US$7900. Building time from the kit was estimated as 700 hours.

== Variants ==
Sirius-C
Model for the European microlight category.

== Specifications (Sirius) ==
Data from Purdy and company website

General characteristics

- Crew: one
- Length: 5.9 m (19.4 ft)
- Wingspan: 13.4 m (44 ft 0 in)
- Wing area: 14.30 m^{2} (153.9 sq ft)
- Empty weight: 142 kg (313 lb)
- Gross weight: 270 kg (595 lb)
- Fuel capacity: 19 litres (4.2 imp gal; 5.0 US gal)
- Powerplant: 1 × König SC 430 three cylinder, two-stroke, radial engine, 18 kW (24 hp)
- Propellers: 2-bladed fixed pitch wooden

Performance

- Maximum speed: 130 km/h (81 mph, 70 kn)
- Cruise speed: 87 km/h (54 mph, 47 kn)
- Stall speed: 48 km/h (30 mph, 26 kn)
- Range: 240 km (150 mi, 130 nmi)
- g limits: +4.4/-2.2
- Maximum glide ratio: 23:1
- Rate of climb: 2.0 m/s (390 ft/min)
- Rate of sink: 0.90 m/s (177 ft/min)

== See also ==
- List of gliders

Aircraft of comparable role, configuration, and era

- Maupin Windrose
