= Maupin Windrose =

American glider

Windrose

General information
- Type: Glider and motor glider
- National origin: United States
- Designer: Jim Maupin
- Number built: at least 14

History
- Introduction date: 1983 (glider); 1984 (motorglider)
- First flight: June 1983 (glider); 1984 (motorglider)

The Maupin Windrose is an American high-wing, single-seat glider and motor glider that was designed by Jim Maupin for the Sailplane Homebuilders Association Design Contest.

== Design and development ==
Maupin designed the Windrose as an easy-to-construct, safe, self-launching, low-cost and aesthetically pleasing aircraft project that could be flown as a pure glider or a powered glider.

The design has many innovative features and is of mixed construction using wood, foam and fiberglass. The wing is carved from solid foam and covered in fiberglass. There is no spar and instead the wing employs bands of unidirectional roving epoxied under the outer skin and joined by vertical dowels to take the compression loads from the underlying foam. The wing is of a 41.5 ft (12.6 m) span or, optionally, a 49.2 ft (15.0 m) span, and uses an Irv Culver custom airfoil. The ailerons are controlled from their inboard ends and there are no control runs inside the wings, which are solid.

The fuselage is built around a hollow plywood box structure that supports the wing, landing gear, cockpit and the optional Cuyuna 430 33 hp (25 kW) engine. The cockpit shell is made from fiberglass. A single triangular spoiler for glidepath control is mounted in the fuselage roof, above the wing center section. Both the vertical stabilizer and the horizontal stabilizer are all-flying surfaces.

== Operational history ==
At least 14 aircraft were completed in the USA. As of July 2011 five remain on the Federal Aviation Administration registry, including four gliders and one motorglider, which is owned by the designer. All are registered in the Experimental - Amateur-built category.

== Variants ==
Windrose glider
Unpowered version with a 315 lb (143 kg) empty weight and a 525 lb (238 kg) gross weight, first flown in June 1983.
Windrose motor glider
Powered version with a 390 lb (177 kg) empty weight and a 600 lb (272 kg) gross weight, first flown in 1984. Take-off distance at sea level on a standard day is 500 ft (152 m) and the initial rate of climb is 500 fpm (2.5 m/s).

== Specifications (Windrose glider) ==
Data from Sailplane Directory and Soaring

General characteristics

- Crew: one
- Length: 21.6 ft (6.6 m)
- Wingspan: 41.5 ft (12.6 m)
- Wing area: 95.25 sq ft (8.849 m^{2})
- Aspect ratio: 18.25:1
- Airfoil: Irv Culver custom
- Empty weight: 315 lb (143 kg)
- Gross weight: 525 lb (238 kg)

Performance

- Maximum glide ratio: 30 at 48 mph (77 km/h)
- Rate of sink: 126 ft/min (0.64 m/s) at 40.5 mph (65.2 km/h)
- Wing loading: 5.5 lb/sq ft (27 kg/m^{2})

== See also ==
Aircraft of comparable role, configuration, and era

- Alpaero Sirius

Related lists

- List of gliders
