= IIL IS-5 =

Single seat, high performance sailplane

IS-5

General information
- Type: Single seat high performance Sailplane
- National origin: Romania
- Manufacturer: Intreprinderea de industrie Locală (IIL)
- Designer: Iosif Șilimon

History
- First flight: 14 June 1960
- Developed from: URMV-3 IS-3

The IIL IS-5 was a single seat, high performance sailplane designed by Iosif Șilimon and built in Romania in 1960.

== Design and development ==
From about 1950 to his death in February 1981, Iosif Silimon was Romania's most prominent glider designer, his aircraft distinguished by his initials. The IS-5 first flew on 14 June 1960. It was a shoulder wing cantilever monoplane developed from the URMV-3 IS-3 and of mixed wood and metal construction. The wings had an all wood structure and were plywood skinned. Mounted with 3° of dihedral, they were straight tapered in plan and built around a single spar with a forward torsion box between it and the leading edge. The tips carried the small streamlined bodies known as salmons, common at the time. The slotted ailerons, which filled about half the span, were ply skinned but with an outer fabric covering.

The IS-5's pod and boom style fuselage was a metal monocoque with the pod ending abruptly at the wing trailing edge and a slender boom aft. The cockpit was enclosed by a single piece, side hinged, moulded perspex canopy. Rectangular airbrakes hinged outwards from the fuselage sides under the wing, each with an area of 0.325 m^{2} (3.5 sq ft). The empennage was conventional, with a ply covered fin which was narrow at the top but faired into the boom above and below. It carried a fabric covered, rounded, unbalanced rudder, broad at its heel, as well as the straight edged tailplane placed just above the boom. There were rounded, spring balanced elevators with gaps at their roots to clear the fin and a small cut out for rudder movement; these control surfaces were ply skinned and fabric covered like the ailerons.

The IS-5 had a short, rubber sprung skid under the cockpit and a fixed, unsprung monowheel under the wing, fitted with a brake. There was also a small extension of the fin to act as a tail bumper.

== Specifications ==
Data from The World's Sailplanes (1963), pp.194-5

General characteristics

- Crew: One
- Length: 6.36 m (20 ft 10 in)
- Wingspan: 15.0 m (49 ft 3 in)
- Wing area: 15.0 m^{2} (161 sq ft)
- Aspect ratio: 15.0
- Airfoil: NACA 23015 at root, NACA 23012 outboard
- Empty weight: 220 kg (485 lb) equipped
- Gross weight: 320 kg (705 lb)

Performance

- Stall speed: 55 km/h (34 mph, 30 kn)
- Never exceed speed: 180 km/h (110 mph, 97 kn) placard, smooth air
- Rough air speed max: 150 km/h (93 mph; 81 kn)
- Aerotow speed: 120 km/h (75 mph; 65 kn)
- Winch launch speed: 90 km/h (56 mph; 49 kn)
- Maximum glide ratio: best, 28:1 at 78 km/h (48 mph; 42 kn)
- Rate of sink: 0.74 m/s (146 ft/min) minimum, at 64 km/h (40 mph; 35 kn)
- Wing loading: 20.9 kg/m^{2} (4.3 lb/sq ft)
