= Radab Windex =

Swedish glider family

Windex
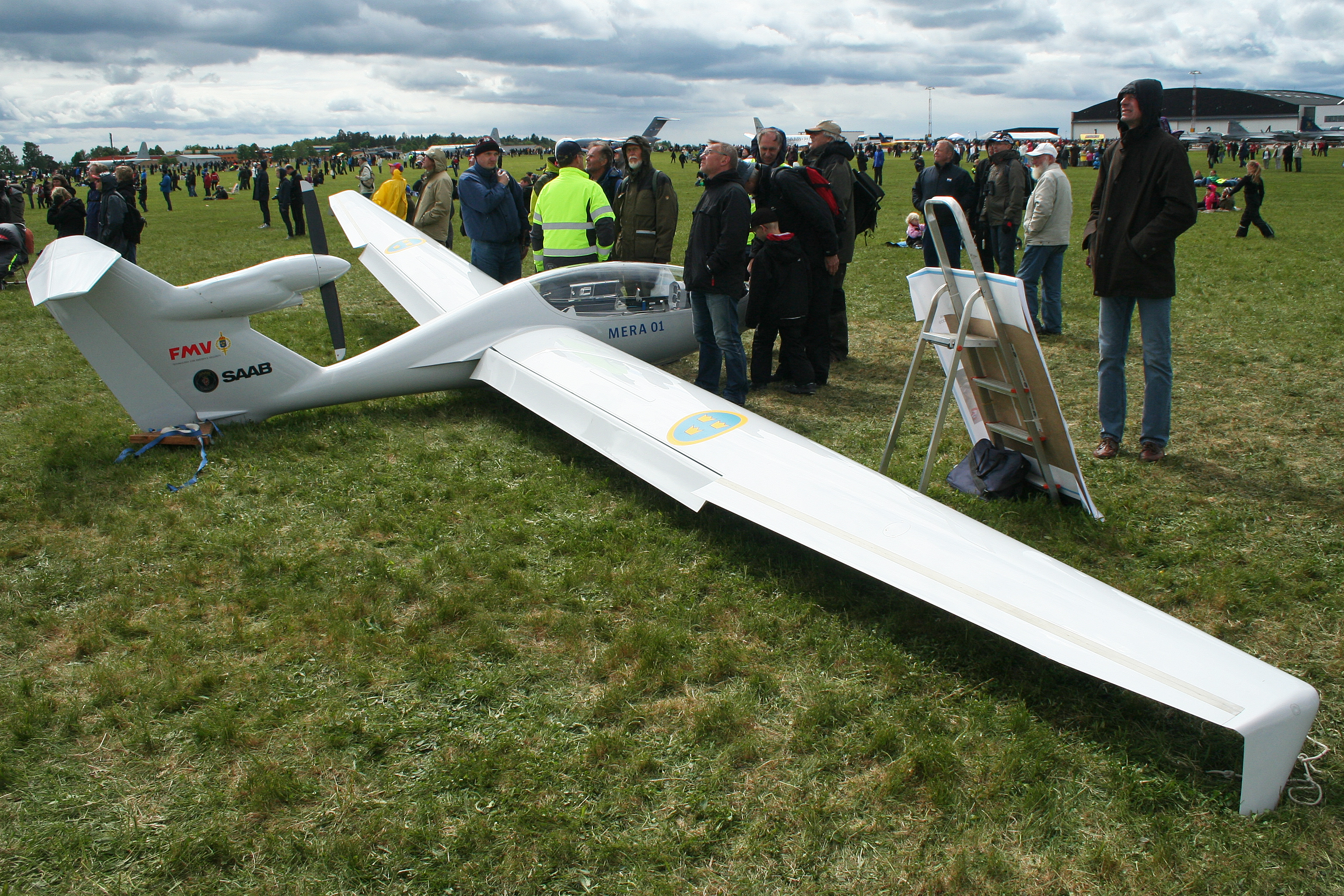
- Saab MERA 1 (Electrically powered Windex 1200C)

General information
- Type: Glider and Motor glider
- National origin: Sweden
- Manufacturer: Radab; WindexAir AB
- Designer: Sven Olof Ridder
- Status: Out of production

History
- Manufactured: 1985-1986, 1990- c.2003
- First flight: 1985 (model 1100)

The Radab Windex is a family of Swedish high-wing, single-seat aerobatic gliders and motor gliders that was designed by Sven Olof Ridder and produced initially by Radab and later by WindexAir AB as a kit for amateur construction.

== Design and development ==
The initial design was the unpowered model 1100. This was followed by the present production 1200C motorglider. The project started off in 1980 as a hobby design between Sven-Olof Ridder and Harald Undén, who later founded Radab to produce the design. By 1983 they had developed the custom airfoil section and tested it in a wind tunnel.

The first unpowered 1100 model flew in 1985, but the following year, as they geared up for kit production the factory burnt down, including all the fibreglass molds that they had built. Only two 1200 C aircraft kits had been produced before the molds were destroyed. One of these was completed in time to be flown at the 1987 Paris Airshow.

By 1990 the molds had been replaced and the first new 1200 C was completed. The first amateur-built Windex was completed from a kit in 1996. By 1999 WindexAir AB had assumed production from Radab.

The 1200 C is built from a combination of carbon-fiber-reinforced polymer and fibreglass. The aircraft is fully aerobatic and stressed to +9/-6g. The 12.1 m (40 ft) span wing has carbon fibre spars and is of a semi-tapered planform. The wing employs a custom Radab KTH-FFA 17% thickness airfoil and features both Schempp-Hirth-style upper surface air brakes and 22.5% chord flaps for glidepath control. The König SC-430 15 kW (20 hp) two-stroke three-cylinder engine is mounted in tractor configuration and has a variable-pitch, fully feathering propeller.

When it was in production the Windex 1200 C was supplied in three kits, fuselage, wings and engine and propeller.

== Operational history ==
In 1991 the prototype was flown at the FAI World Glider Aerobatic Championships held at Zielona Góra, Poland, winning two bronze medals.

In August 2011 there were four Windex motor gliders and one glider registered in the United States with the Federal Aviation Administration. All are in the Experimental - Amateur-built category.

== Variants ==
1100
Initial prototype motor-glider version, powered by a 16.4 kW (22.0 hp) Limbach engine, flying for the first time in the summer of 1985.
1200
Production version built using Nomex honeycomb, with a T-tail and increased span wings of the same area. Powered by a 18.6 kW (25 hp) Windex 300 3-cyl. two-stroke engine.
1200 C
Later production version, with a 15 kW (20 hp) König SC-430 engine mounted midway on the vertical stabilizer. The engine has electric starting and weighs 13.8 kg (30 lb).

== Specifications (1200C) ==
Data from Sailplane Directory and company website, Jane's All the World's Aircraft 1988-89

General characteristics

- Crew: one
- Length: 4.92 m (16 ft 2 in)
- Wingspan: 12.1 m (39 ft 8 in)
- Wing area: 7.41 m^{2} (79.8 sq ft)
- Aspect ratio: 19.75:1
- Airfoil: Radab KTH-FFA 17%
- Empty weight: 175 kg (386 lb)
- Gross weight: 310 kg (683 lb)
- Fuel capacity: 20 L (5.3 US gal; 4.4 imp gal)
- Powerplant: 1 × König SC-430 3-cyl. air-cooled two-stroke piston engine, 15 kW (20 hp)
- Propellers: 2-bladed Radab variable-pitch feathering Epoxy/Kevlar propeller, 1.05 m (3 ft 5 in) diameter

Performance

- Maximum speed: 270 km/h (170 mph, 150 kn) level flight
- Cruise speed: 210 km/h (130 mph, 110 kn) 50% power
- Stall speed: 70 km/h (43 mph, 38 kn) powered
- Never exceed speed: 350 km/h (220 mph, 190 kn) in smooth air
- Max rough air speed: 252 km/h (136 kn; 157 mph)max fuel no reserves
- g limits: +9 -6
- Maximum glide ratio: 36:1
- Best glide speed: 100 km/h (54 kn; 62 mph)
- Rate of climb: 2.5 m/s (490 ft/min)
- Rate of sink: 0.61 m/s (120 ft/min) *Minimum sink speed: 80 km/h (43 kn; 50 mph)
- Wing loading: 41.83 kg/m^{2} (8.57 lb/sq ft)
- Power/mass: 16.1 kg/kW (26.45 lb/hp)

== See also ==
- List of gliders
