= Air Est Goeland =

French single-seat motor glider, 1987

Goeland

General information
- Type: Motor glider
- National origin: France
- Manufacturer: Air Est Services
- Designer: Robert Clavé
- Status: Production completed
- Number built: 2 (1998)

History
- First flight: October 1987
- Developed from: Scheibe Spatz

The Air Est Goeland (English: Gull), sometimes called the Clavé Goéland, after the designer, is a French parasol-wing, T-tailed, single-seat motor glider that was designed by Robert Clavé and produced by Air Est Services of Marly, Moselle in kit form for amateur construction.

== Design and development ==
The aim of the Goeland was to provide a viable motor glider design based on wings taken from a Scheibe Spatz glider. The kit was supplied with two fuselage halves and the tail parts only, leaving it up to the builder to secure the Spatz wings and engine to finish the aircraft.

The finished aircraft is of mixed construction with a fibreglass fuselage and wood and doped aircraft fabric wings. The 13.20 m (43.3 ft) span wings are mounted on a short pylon above the fuselage, although other sailplane wings can be employed in place of the Spatz wings. The specified König SC 430 18 kW (24 hp) radial engine is mounted in pusher configuration behind the wing and above the tail boom, although other similar engines can be used. The aircraft features tricycle landing gear and a cockpit bubble canopy.

In 1998 the basic kit was US$4400 and included just the fuselage halves and tail. A finished fuselage was US$8400 and plans were advertised at US$200. Building time was estimated at 300 hours.

== Specifications (Goeland) ==
Data from Purdy

General characteristics

- Crew: one
- Wingspan: 13.2 m (43 ft 4 in)
- Wing area: 11.6 m^{2} (125 sq ft)
- Aspect ratio: 15:1
- Empty weight: 186 kg (410 lb)
- Gross weight: 299 kg (660 lb)
- Fuel capacity: 23 litres (5.1 imp gal; 6.1 US gal)
- Powerplant: 1 × König SC 430 three cylinder radial engine, 18 kW (24 hp)

Performance

- Maximum speed: 153 km/h (95 mph, 83 kn)
- Cruise speed: 105 km/h (65 mph, 56 kn)
- Stall speed: 55 km/h (34 mph, 30 kn) in clean configuration
- Maximum glide ratio: 27:1
- Rate of climb: 3.5 m/s (680 ft/min)
- Wing loading: 25.8 kg/m^{2} (5.28 lb/sq ft)

== See also ==
- List of gliders
