= List of Canadian gliders =

This is a list of gliders/sailplanes of the world, (this reference lists all gliders with references, where available) Note: Any aircraft can glide for a short time, but gliders are designed to glide for longer.

== Canadian miscellaneous constructors ==
- Birdman Project 102 Windsoar – Birdman Enterprises
- Brochocki BKB-1
- Czerwiński Sparrow – close copy of the W.W.S.1 Salamandra – de Havilland Aircraft Canada
- Czerwiński Robin – modified Sparrow – de Havilland Aircraft Canada
- Czerwinski-Shenstone UTG-1 Loudon – Étudiants de L'Université de Toronto
- Marsden Gemini – Marsden, David
- NRC tailless glider – National Research Council / Geoffrey Hill
- Czerwiński-Shenstone Harbinger – Shenstone, Beverley S. & Czerwinski, Waclaw
- Viking 104 – Tingskou, Paul – built by Peterson, Oscar "Pete"
