= Spengler HS3 Skikarus =

One-man ski-glider

HS3 Skikarus

General information
- Type: One-man ski-glider
- National origin: Switzerland
- Designer: Hans Spengler
- Number built: 1

History
- First flight: 1968

The Spengler HS3 Skikarus is a Swiss one-man ski-glider (an early hang glider) designed and built by Hans Spengler in the 1960s. The Skikarus was a monoplane with a tail at the end of an open frame fuselage. The pilot hung from a harness at the front of the fuselage frame and wore a pair of skis for landing and takeoff. With a takeoff run downhill of between 10 and 20 metres (33 to 66 feet) it has flown distances between 200m and 1 km (655 to 32855 feet) with a maximum speed of 40 kmh (35 mph).

== Specifications ==
Data from Jane's All the World's Aircraft 1973-74

General characteristics

- Crew: 1
- Length: 5.40 m (17 ft 8.5 in)
- Wingspan: 7.14 m (23 ft 6 in)
- Empty weight: 33 kg (72.5 lb)

== See also ==
Related lists

- List of gliders
