= Aeroflot Flight 343 =

1982 aviation accident in Luxembourg

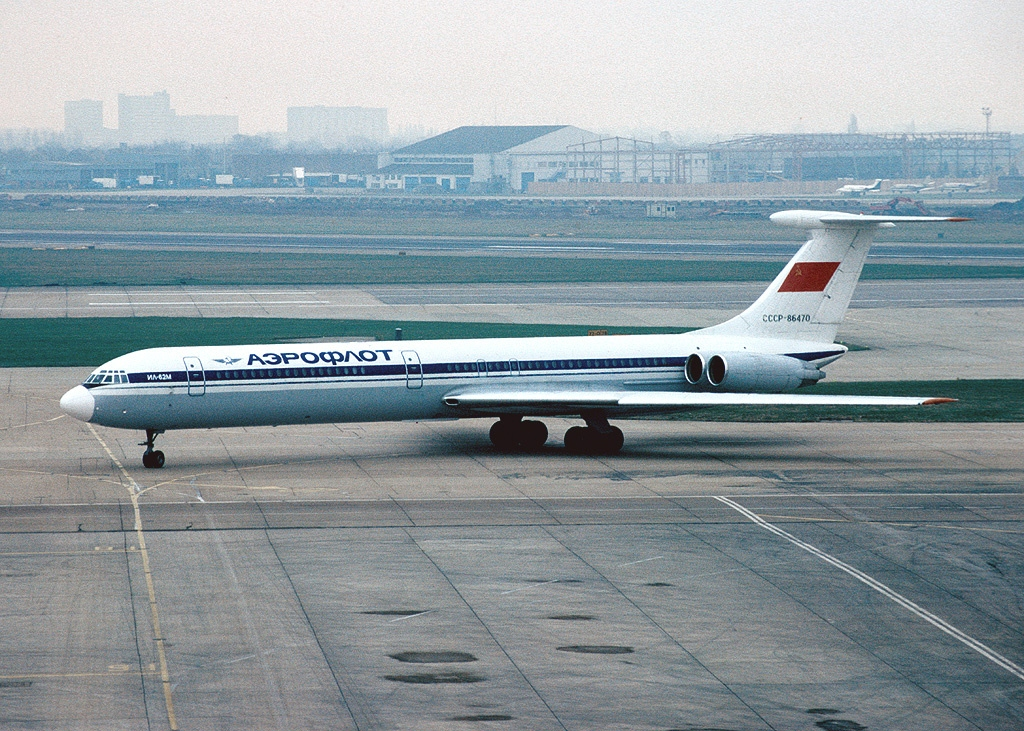
- CCCP-86470, the aircraft involved in the accident, photographed in January 1982

Accident
- Date: 29 September 1982
- Summary: Mechanical failure, runway excursion
- Site: Luxembourg Findel Airport; 49°37′24″N 006°12′16″E

Aircraft
- Aircraft type: Ilyushin Il-62M
- Operator: Aeroflot
- IATA flight No.: SU343
- ICAO flight No.: AFL343
- Call sign: AEROFLOT 343
- Registration: CCCP-86470
- Flight origin: Sheremetyevo International Airport, Moscow
- 1st stopover: Luxembourg Findel Airport
- 2nd stopover: José Martí International Airport
- Destination: Jorge Chávez International Airport
- Occupants: 77
- Passengers: 66
- Crew: 11
- Fatalities: 7
- Injuries: 70
- Survivors: 70

On 29 September 1982, Aeroflot Flight 343, a scheduled international passenger flight flying from Moscow-Sheremetyevo Airport to Jorge Chávez International Airport, on a stopover at Luxembourg-Findel International Airport, veered off the runway, fatally injuring seven occupants. The Ilyushin Il-62M operating the flight suffered a mechanical failure.

== Aircraft and crew ==
The aircraft involved, manufactured in 1977, was an Ilyushin Il-62M registered as СССP-86470 with serial number 1725234. At the time of the accident, the aircraft had flown for 10,325 hours. It was equipped with four Soloviev D-30KU engines. Engines 1 and 4 were equipped with thrust reversers.

The crew members consisted of 6 pilots and 5 flight attendants:

The captain, aged 47, had a total of 9,487 flight hours including 3,168 hours on the Ilyushin Il-62M; the first officer, aged 55, had a total of 10,441 flight hours including 3,605 hours on the Il-62M; the flight engineer, aged 46, had a total of 7,565 flight hours including 2,893 hours on the Il-62M; the radio operator, aged 34, had a total of 1,282 flight hours, all of which were on the Il-62M; the navigator, aged 46, had a total of 8,527 flight hours, including 2,698 hours on the Il-62M; and an extra pilot, a 58-year-old flight instructor, had 8,701 total flight hours, with 4,102 hours on the Il-62M.

== Accident ==
Aeroflot Flight 343 was a regularly scheduled international passenger flight departing from Sheremetyevo International Airport, Russia, to Jorge Chávez International Airport, Peru, via stopover flights at Luxembourg Findel Airport, Luxembourg and José Martí International Airport, Cuba. At 18:50 GMT (UTC+00:00), weather conditions at Luxembourg Findel Airport included winds of 4 knots (7.4 km/h) with a wind direction of 120°, with visibility being described as "CAVOK".

The aircraft took off from Moscow at 16:15. At 19:21:33, the crew contacted Luxembourg Findel Airport's ATC announcing that they have the runway in sight. The crew subsequently obtained the authorization to land. After touching down at 19:23:23, the aircraft deviated towards the right. The aircraft, which the pilot was unable to control, was exiting the runway from the right side 1,300 metres (4,300 ft) away from the runway threshold. The aircraft continued to track on the earth moving further away from the runway. The aircraft struck a partially buried building and fell into a wooded ravine, lying 1,200 metres (3,900 ft) away from the runway threshold and 200 metres (660 ft) away from the center of the runway.

The aircraft was destroyed by the crash and ensuing fire. The building was lightly damaged with trees being broken and burned.

== Aftermath ==
The Soviet Government expressed its condolences to the relatives and friends of the victims.

== Investigation ==
Following the accident, Luxembourgish authorities sent a notification of the crash to Soviet authorities as the aircraft was built, registered, and operated by the country. Luxembourgish aviation authorities requested that experts from Belgium's aeronautical administration conduct the investigation. A Soviet delegation participated in the investigation. In collaboration with Belgian experts, Soviet technical experts from the Ministry of Civil Aviation participated in the technical examinations of the engines and the thrust reversers at Luxembourg Findel Airport.

The investigation determined the probable cause of the accident to be mechanical failure of the thrust reversers on engine No.1:

French: L'accident peut être attribué à une panne mécanique affectant le mécanisme de commande des inverseurs de poussée survenue dans la phase la plus critique de l'atterrissage. Cette panne, soudaine et imprévisible, n'a pas été identifiée par l'équipage et a rendu l'avion incontrôlable en direction pendant l'exécution de la procédure normale d'atterrissage.

[The accident may be attributed to a mechanical failure affecting the mechanism of controlling thrust which occurred during the most critical phase of landing. This failure, sudden and unforeseeable, was not identified by the crew and made the aircraft uncontrollable in direction during the execution of the normal landing procedure.]

— Aeronautical Administration of the Kingdom of Belgium, page 24.
