= URMV-3 IS-2 =

IS-2

General information
- Type: Sailplane
- National origin: Romania
- Manufacturer: URMV-3
- Designer: Iosif Șilimon

History
- First flight: 14 August 1950

The IS-2 was an intermediate training glider designed by Iosif Şilimon and built in Romania in the 1950s at the URMV-3 (Rom: Uzinele de Reparatii Material Volant-3 - Glider repair and manufacture factory) factory at Brașov.

== Design and development ==
The IS-2 was designed as an intermediate training glider. Construction was largely of wood with fabric and plywood skinning, similar to the Grunau Baby pre-war German glider. Very little is known of the IS-2's development or operational history. Of conventional configuration with high-set cantilever wings and cruciform tail-unit, the IS-2 was also flown with an increased span wing.

== Specifications (IS-2) ==
Data from The World's Sailplanes:Die Segelflugzeuge der Welt:Les Planeurs du Monde Volume II

General characteristics

- Crew: 1
- Length: 6.54 m (21 ft 5 in)
- Wingspan: 12.3 m (40 ft 4 in)
- Height: 1.05 m (3 ft 5 in) at cockpit
- Wing area: 14.7 m^{2} (158 sq ft)
- Aspect ratio: 10.3
- Airfoil: Root:Göttingen 535, Mid Göttingen 535, Tip Göttingen 676
- Empty weight: 152 kg (335 lb)
- Gross weight: 250 kg (551 lb)

Performance

- Stall speed: 42 km/h (26 mph, 23 kn)
- Never exceed speed: 180 km/h (110 mph, 97 kn) *Rough air speed max: 130 km/h (81 mph; 70 kn)
- Aerotow speed: 110 km/h (68 mph; 59 kn)
- Winch launch speed: 80 km/h (50 mph; 43 kn)
- Terminal velocity: with full air-brakes at max all-up weight 180 km/h (112 mph; 97 kn)
- g limits: +4 -2.2 at 185 km/h (99.9 kn)
- Maximum glide ratio: 20 at 69 km/h (43 mph; 37 kn)
- Rate of sink: 0.77 m/s (152 ft/min) at 32.9 mph; 28.6 kn (53 km/h)
- Wing loading: 17 kg/m^{2} (3.5 lb/sq ft)

== See also ==
Aircraft of comparable role, configuration, and era

- Grunau Baby
- Slingsby Cadet
- Slingsby Kirby Tutor

Related lists List of gliders
