= IIL IS-10 =

Glider

IS-10

General information
- Type: Single seat glider
- National origin: Romania
- Manufacturer: Intreprinderea de industrie Locală (IIL)
- Designer: Iosif Șilimon

History
- First flight: 6 April 1960
- Developed from: IIL IS-4

The IIL IS-10 was a high-performance, single-seat glider, designed and built in Romania in the early 1960s. It was the first Romanian aircraft to use laminar flow airfoils.

== Design and development ==
From about 1950 to his death in February 1981, Iosif Silimon was Romania's most prominent glider designer, his aircraft distinguished by his initials. His single seat IS-10 was a wooden, shoulder wing sailplane, designed for Standard Class competitions. It was an evolution of the IS-4, the first Romanian glider designed to meet the FAI Standard Class specifications and flown the previous year.

The cantilever shoulder wing of the IS-10 was mounted with a dihedral of 2.5°. It was built around a single spar with a plywood covered torsion box ahead of it around the leading edge. Behind the spar the wing was fabric-covered. The leading edge was straight and unswept, and over the inner half span section the trailing edge ran parallel, apart from a root extension rearwards to blend wing and fuselage. The outer panels were straight-tapered, with short span, slotted ailerons that were fabric-over-ply-covered. The IS-10 had spoilers, opening both above and below the wing, mounted at midchord on the inner panels. The wing tips carried the small, streamlined bodies known as salmons, which were common at the time. The laminar flow wing sections were from the NACA airfoil 6-series, with a thickness-chord ratio of 18% over most of the span.

The fuselage of the IS-10 was an oval section, slender plywood monocoque. The pilot sat in a semi-reclining position in a long, single-seat cockpit under a single-piece, side-opening perspex canopy which, with a short fixed transparency behind it. stretched from the nose into the leading edge of the wing. Its undercarriage comprised a short, rubber-sprung skid from the nose to only about halfway to the wing. A fixed, unsprung monowheel was semi-recessed into the fuselage under the wing and fitted with a brake. Further aft the fuselage tapered to a conventional empennage. A narrow, ply-covered fin and a fabric-covered rudder, which extended down to the keel, together formed a straight-tapered, flat-topped vertical tail. The fin also mounted a straight-edged, fabric-over-ply-covered tailplane placed just above the fuselage, which carried straight-tapered, similarly skinned elevators. These were balanced by a bob weight within the fuselage and had gaps both at their roots to clear the fin and at their tips to clear rearward tailplane extensions, with a small central cut out for rudder movement. A small tail bumper was fitted under the rudder hinge.

The IS-10 was first flown on 6 April 1960.

== Specifications ==
Data from Sailplanes of the World, pp.202-3

General characteristics

- Crew: One
- Length: 7.44 m (24 ft 5 in)
- Wingspan: 15.0 m (49 ft 3 in)
- Height: 1.60 m (5 ft 3 in)
- Wing area: 13.2 m^{2} (142 sq ft)
- Aspect ratio: 17
- Airfoil: NACA 63_{4}621 root, 63_{2}618 from mid span outwards
- Empty weight: 240 kg (529 lb)
- Gross weight: 340 kg (750 lb)

Performance

- Stall speed: 62 km/h (39 mph, 33 kn)
- Never exceed speed: 230 km/h (140 mph, 120 kn) placard, in smooth air
- Rough air speed max: 150 km/h (93 mph; 81 kn)
- Aerotow speed: 120 km/h (75 mph; 65 kn)
- Winch launch speed: 90 km/h (56 mph; 49 kn)
- Maximum glide ratio: best 32.7 at 85 km/h (53 mph; 46 kn)
- Rate of sink: 0.67 m/s (132 ft/min) minimum, at 72 km/h (45 mph; 39 kn)
- Wing loading: 25.7 kg/m^{2} (5.3 lb/sq ft)
