= List of South African gliders =

This is a list of gliders/sailplanes of the world, (this reference lists all gliders with references, where available) Note: Any aircraft can glide for a short time, but gliders are designed to glide for longer.

== South African miscellaneous constructors ==
- Aero-Xpert AX-1 – Aero-Xpert, Hennopsmeer (CELLIER, Peter & JORDAAN, François)
- BJ-1 design
- Beatty-Johl BJ-2 Assegai
- Beatty-Johl BJ-3
- Beatty-Johl BJ-4 1969 world gliding championships page15-16Images
- Celair GA-1 Celstar – Celair Manufacturing and Export (CELLIER, Peter & JORDAAN, François)
- Exulans (glider) (Pretoria University)
- JG-1 (glider)
- Jonker JS-1 Revelation – Jonker Sailplanes / JONKER, Attie
- Jonker JS-3 Rapture – Jonker Sailplanes / JONKER, Attie
- Vine 1930 glider
- Russell Whisper 2004
