= List of French gliders =

This is a list of gliders/sailplanes of the world, (this reference lists all gliders with references, where available) Note: Any aircraft can glide for a short time, but gliders are designed to glide for longer.

== French miscellaneous constructors ==
- AAS Libération
- Abric-Calas 1909 biplane glider
- AC Mulhouse Mure – Aéro Club de Mulhouse
- ACBA 3 – Aéro Club du Bas Armagnac
- Aérostructure Lutin-80 – Aérostructure SARL
- Ateliers vosgiens 1909 glider
- Avialsa 60 Fauconnet
- Barel Graal – Graal Aéro – Berel, Max
- Baron Aéro Ramo-Planeur – A. Baron
- Belin bros. 1908 glider
- Bellanger-Denhaut BD-1
- Berger 1905 glider built by a M. Berger in Lyon and flown by Gardey
- Berliaux-Salètes 1909 glider no.1
- Berliaux-Salètes 1909 Pourquoi Pas? II
- Biot Massia
- Blériot II
- Bonnet-Clément BC-7 – BONNET, Pierre / Ets Louis Clément
- Boulay-Ferrier Condor – Jacques Boulay & Hubert Ferrier
- Boulay-Menin BM-1 – Jacques Boulay & Menin
- Bourieau-Chapautau glider
- Brylinski JJ-2 – Brylinsky, Jacques & Wehrle, Jean
- Brylinski JJ-3 – Brylinsky, Jacques & Wehrle, Jean
- Brylinski Petrel
- Bünzli 1908 glider – Bunzli, Henri René / Société de Construction d'Appareils Aériens, Levallois
- Calvel Frelon – Jacques Calvel
- CAU Frelon – Club Aéronautique Universitaire
- Caucase du Nord
- Caux 1922 glider – Jules Caux
- Clavé Goéland
- Clément Triplan
- Collard-Piel Compact
- Coupet-Guerchais glider
- Cousin Voilier
- d'Andre 1908 glider
- de Monge DMP-1
- de Rougé Elytroplan Sigma – De Rouge, Charles
- Domenjoz Planeur-Voilier – John Auguste Domenjoz
- Elytre
- Fage Dédale – Fage, Jacques
- Favier LF-3 –
- Ferber 5 – Ferber, Ferdinand
- Ferber P-1 – Ferber, Ferdinand
- Gabelier RG-40 – Gabelier, Raymond
- Gad'Arts AM-58
- Gilbert 1922 – Gilbert, J.
- Grandin Chauve-souris – Grandin, Henry
- Grandin Mouette – Grandin, Henry
- Groux – Groux, Georges
- Guilhabert Pou-Planeur
- Harth S-1 – Harth, Friedrich
- Hurel Aviette – Hurel, Maurice – man powered
- Jamin 1932 glider
- Kosellek G-1 Quo Vadis – Kosellek, Gilbert
- Kristal (avion)
- La Guêpe
- Lanaverre CS-II Cirrus
- Lanaverre SL-2 Janus
- Landes Oiseau Bleu – Landes Frères
- Landes-Bréguet Mouette – Landes Frères – Breguet, Louis
- Landes-Derouin – Landes Frères & Derouin
- Le Bris Aéro-Voilier
- Le Bris Albatros
- Le Bris La Barque Ailée
- Le Grolinet
- Lefort Triplan – Lefort, Lucien
- Leroy Motoplaneur – LEROY G., Aéroc-Club de l'Eure, Professeur Technique à l'École Professionelle d'Évreux
- Leyat 1909 glider – designed by Leyat, Marcel Constructed by Mr Audra, Die
- Leyat 1924 glider – designed by Leyat, Marcel Constructed by Association Française Aérienne
- Lucas L-6A – Lucas, Émile – Avions Émile Lucas
- Magnan Albatros
- Magnan M-2 Marin
- Magnan Vautour
- Magnard glider
- Massia-Biot
- Massy 1922 glider – Massy, Max
- Minéo M-5 – Mineo, Michel
- Minéo M-6 – Mineo, Michel
- Mudry CAP-1 – Avions Mudry Cie, Port d'attache, Cannes Mandelieu
- Nessler N-1 Aérovoilier – Nessler, Éric
- Nessler N-2 – Nessler, Éric
- Nessler N-3 – Nessler, Éric
- Nessler N-4 – Nessler, Éric
- Nogrady Tsarevitch – Nogrady, Claude Bela
- Nord 1300
- Nord 2000 – Nord Aviation
- Pastel MN 600 K – Montagne Noire
- Payre AM-56 – Payre, Georges
- Peulet Biplace Marcel Guittard – Peulet – Aéro-Club de Créteil
- Peulet PC-1 Bigorneau – Peulet – Aéro-Club de Créteil
- Peyret Alérion Tandem – Peyret, Louis
- Pimoule – Pimoule, J.
- Potez P-VIII – Potez, Henry
- Pou P AR-1 – Cosandy, Louis – Rocheblaye, Alain
- Renard Décaplan Aéride – Renard, Charles
- REP Type-1 – Robert Esnault-Pelterie
- REP Type-2 – Robert Esnault-Pelterie
- Riout 102T Alérion – Rioux, René – Ornithopter
- Robert Aéroplane
- Rollé 1922 glider – Rolle, J.
- Rousset glider – Rousset, Mauritius
- Sablier Perfo-E
- Sablier type 8
- Saucède PLS-1 – Saucede, Lucien & Saucede, Pierre
- Savoyas Hirondelle
- SBT (glider) – Saboureault, Paul & Touza, Joseph & Boussiere, Edouard
- Scrive 1908 glider – Scrive, Didier
- Scrive-Coquard SC – Scrive, Didier & Coquard, Marcel
- Sevimia SM-20 – (Victor Minié Aviation)
- SNCASE PM-110 Midi – Robert Castello & Al. – S.N.C.A.S.E. (Société Nationale de Constructions Aéronautiques du Sud-Est)
- SNCASE PM-200 – Robert Castello & Al. – S.N.C.A.S.E. (Société Nationale de Constructions Aéronautiques du Sud-Est)
- SNCASO SO-P1 Ferblantine – Société Nationale des Constructions Aéronautiques du Sud-Ouest
- Stark AS-07 Stabiplan – Starck, André
- Thomas 1923 glider – Thomas, A.
- Thorouss 1922 glider – Thorouss, Gustave
- Tomasini 1923 glider – Tomasini, Charles
- Truchet Tr-301 Abyssin – Trucet, Jean-Marc
- Valette (glider) – Valette, Aimé
- Verrimst-Maneyrol – Verrimst, Robert & Maneyrol, Alexis
- Voisin LV-104 – Voisin, Gabriel & Voisin, Charles
- Vuillemenot AE-15
