= List of New Zealand gliders =

This is a list of gliders/sailplanes of the world, (this reference lists all gliders with references, where available) Note: Any aircraft can glide for a short time, but gliders are designed to glide for longer.

== New Zealand miscellaneous constructors ==
- Righton Big Wing – experimental monoplane glider
