= List of Austrian gliders =

This is a list of gliders/sailplanes of the world, (this reference lists all gliders with references, where available) Note: Any aircraft can glide for a short time, but gliders are designed to glide for longer.

== Austrian miscellaneous constructors ==
- Etrich-Wels 1904 kite/glider
- Etrich-Wels 1906 Glider – Etrich's Leaf, 1906
- Harbich Ha-12/49 – licence built SG-38
- Lohner-Umlauff Rodelgleiter – Lohner & Umlauff, Hans von – Lohner Flugzeugbau, Vienna
- Standard Austria Österreichischer Aeroclub – Austrian Aero Club
- Malliga 1 – Malliga, Horst Josef – Human-powered aircraft
- Malliga 2 – Malliga, Horst Josef – Human-powered aircraft
- Sterz P-77
- Swaty Kandidat – Swaty, Franz
- Souczek Bussard II - Prof. Souczek with Franz Rainer
