= Lilian Bland =

English aviator

- Bland with the Mayfly
- Born: 28 September 1878; Kent, England
- Died: 11 May 1971 (aged 92)
- Burial place: St Sennen's churchyard, Sennen, near Land's End, Cornwall
- Spouse: Charles Loftus Bland

Lilian Bland (28 September 1878 – 11 May 1971) was an Anglo-Irish journalist and pioneer aviator who, in 1910–11, became one of the first women in Great Britain and Ireland, and maybe even in the world, to design, build, and fly an aircraft – the Bland Mayfly.

== Early life ==
Bland was born in Maidstone, Kent on 28 September 1878, to a family of Anglo-Irish gentry, the third child of Emily Charlotte (née Madden) and John Humphrey Bland and lived at Willington House, on Willington Street (formerly Willington Lane). Around the turn of the century, she began working as a sports journalist and press photographer for various London newspapers, Bland lived an unconventional lifestyle for the period: smoking, wearing trousers, hunting, shooting, and fishing.

Between 1900 and 1906, following the death of her mother, Bland (aged 28) and her father moved to the family home Tobercorran House on Glebe Road West in Carnmoney, north of Belfast. Bland and her father moved in with her aunt Sarah Maria Wintringham Smythe (d. 1918). Sarah had married General William James Smythe on 15 December 1857; the couple had no children and Smythe had died on 12 July 1887.

From here, Bland continued her photographic work, spending days on remote Scottish islands photographing seabirds, which increased her fascination with flying.

== Aviation career ==
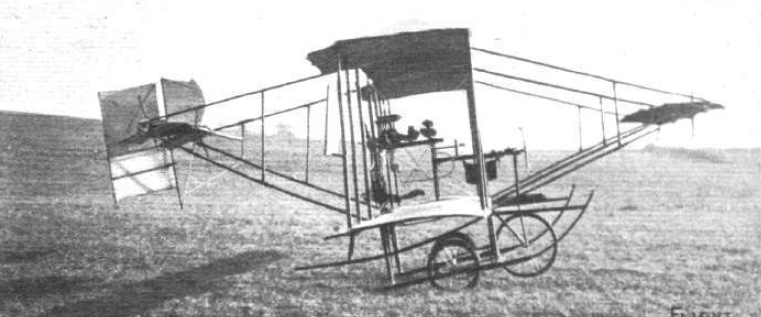
The Mayfly was an aircraft designed and constructed by Lilian Bland in 1910

Bland's uncle Robert sent her a postcard of the Blériot monoplane from Paris, inspiring her to take up flying. She studied the measurements of the monoplane during the first official aviation meeting held in Blackpool in 1909, and added her own thoughts into the design of her plane, the Mayfly. The Mayfly had similar wings to Blériot's design, but it could get off the ground by itself. At that point, no one in Ireland had yet made a powered flight – the first would be Harry Ferguson, in December – and to make an aircraft would involve building it herself. Her late uncle, General William James Smythe, an astronomer and member of the Royal Society, provided a house with a workshop. After some background reading on the Wright brothers, and becoming inspired by their achievements, Bland successfully built a flyable model biplane with a wing span of six feet.

Mayfly in flight with Bland piloting

From this, she progressed to a full-scale glider with others' help, which was built from spruce, bamboo and canvas and completed early in 1910. For months of experiments, she made numerous glider flights to improve the plane. The finished glider had a wingspan of 20 feet and 7 inches, and weighed 200 pounds. Due to the doubts that were expressed to her about its flying capability, Bland, with deliberate irony, named it Mayfly. The resulting Mayfly was tested by gliding it from Carnmoney Hill, being progressively strengthened and tested with heavier loads, until Bland felt it was strong enough to take an engine. The load test was done by four Irish constables. Since the plane could lift four men, Bland believed it could carry one English engine. She ordered a light 20 horsepower two-stroke engine from A. V. Roe & Co. for £100, and after some delays brought it to Carnmoney in July.

The horizontally opposed two-cylinder engine achieved 20 horsepower at 1000 rpm. Bland was eager to test the engine-powered aircraft before its petrol tank was ready, so she improvised: an empty whiskey bottle was used instead, with Bland's deaf aunt's ear trumpet as the engine hose. This construction was not quite a success—the engine's vibrations compromised the security of the plane's nuts, bolts, and struts, and Bland's flight would have to wait.

Preparations of the Mayfly started in 1909, and the first successful flight was made at Randalstown in late August in 1910, a short hop off the ground. While perching on a canvas open-air seat, she manipulated controls to maintain the flight in balance after running forward about 30 feet and stayed in the air for a quarter of a mile. The controls consisted of a bicycle handle bar. Not only did this make Bland the first woman to fly an aircraft in Ireland, but the Mayfly also became the first powered biplane in Ireland. In 2017, Sinead Morrisey recounts one of Bland's flights in her poem The Mayfly.

She continued experimenting with further flights, mostly around thirty feet (ten metres) in length, sometimes requiring examination of the ground to identify when the Mayfly had actually lifted off. The longest flight after the first try was approximately one-quarter of a mile (400 metres). She began to plan an improved version and offered biplanes for sale at £250 apiece without an engine and gliders for £80 to fund further development. The Mayfly was able to stably glide over 90 yards and rise 30 feet even in gusty winds, according to Bland's words. The aircraft was, however, not capable of much more and would not cope with a larger engine. Finally, Bland gave the Mayfly air-frame to a boy's gliding club and sold the engine.

== Later life ==
By April 1911, she was running a Ford car dealership in Belfast, Ireland, but in 1911, she gave up the business to marry her cousin Charles Loftus Bland (born 21 October 1881). Charles was a lumberjack from British Columbia and had returned to Ireland to propose to Lilian. The couple married on 3 October 1911 and soon emigrated to Canada, where they built their own farm on virgin lands.

Charles and Lilian had their first and only child, Patricia Lilian Bland, on 13 April 1913. Patricia died of tetanus in September 1929, at the age of 16. The couple separated soon after, with Lilian moving back to England and Charles going on to marry his second wife, Mary (who was a cousin of both Lilian and Charles).

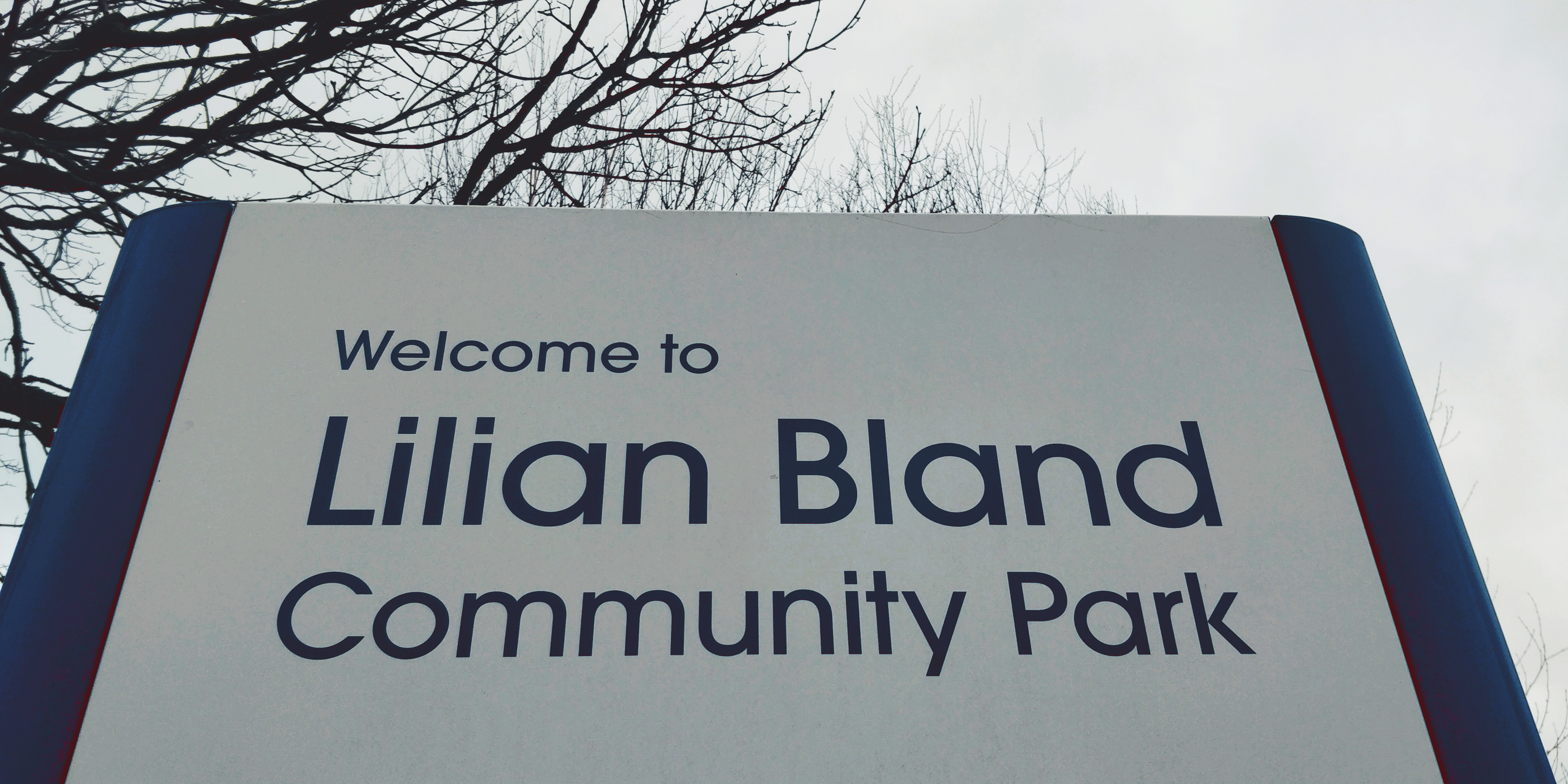
The Lilian Bland Community Park

Bland returned to the United Kingdom in 1935, settling in Kent. She became a gardener and gambled her wages on the stock market in the hopes of getting more money. She also wrote a memoir about her life during this time, which is yet to be published. By the 1950s, Bland had retired to Cornwall. In 1971, at the age of 92, Bland was quoted by the Belfast Telegraph for saying that the only excitement left to her was gambling. She died soon after on 11 May of the same year.

== Legacy ==
Bland was commemorated by an Ulster History Circle blue plaque at the family home in Carnmoney, County Antrim and Mayfly was presented to the Dublin Club. Glengormley Park in Newtownabbey was renamed Lilian Bland Community Park in August 2011; at the same time, a stainless-steel sculpture of the Mayfly was unveiled. Four of her paintings were put up for auction in Penzance in July 2021.

A 2021 exhibition on Irish innovators presented by National Museums NI the Ulster Transport Museum in Cultra, Belfast, featured Bland's contribution to Irish aviation.

Zara Rutherford, the youngest woman to fly solo around the world (at age 19 in 2022), credited Lilian Bland as one of her sources of inspiration.
