= List of Philippines gliders =

This is a list of gliders/sailplanes of the world, (this reference lists all gliders with references, where available) Note: Any aircraft can glide for a short time, but gliders are designed to glide for longer.

== Philippines miscellaneous constructors ==
- I.S.T. L-10 Balang Institute of Science and Technology, Philippines - (Philippines Institute of Science and Technology)
