= List of Slovenian gliders =

This is a list of gliders/sailplanes of the world, (this reference lists all gliders with references, where available) Note: Any aircraft can glide for a short time, but gliders are designed to glide for longer.

== Slovenian miscellaneous constructors ==
- Humek H-2 Metla
- Apis 15
