= List of Latvian gliders =

This is a list of gliders/sailplanes of the world, (this reference lists all gliders with references, where available) Note: Any aircraft can glide for a short time, but gliders are designed to glide for longer.

== Latvian miscellaneous constructors ==
data from:-

- Acs (glider)
- Aizsardze
- Alise (glider)
- Apogs
- Auseklis (glider)
- Burbulmate
- Cirulitis
- Cukurs C-4 – Herberts Cukurs
- Daugaviete
- Vainode Duja – A Hutter-17 type, based in Vainode. Built by the 17th Glider Aviator Group.
- 2nd Aviation Scouts Duja – A primary type constructed by the 2nd Aviation Scouts.
- Dzelzcelnieks
- Dzelzcelnieks II
- Dzelzcelnieks III
- Dzerve
- Edgars laksevics
- Erglis
- Gaigalina
- Gintaras (glider)
- Gulbene II
- Gulbis (glider)
- Jelgava-Hütter 17
- Vilnis-Hütter 17 – Edvins Vilnis
- Stekelis-Hütter 17 – Huberts Stekelis
- Jelgava I
- Kaija (glider)
- Krustpilnieks
- Lāčplēsis (glider)
- Latvija (glider)
- Lenta (glider)
- Maikapars
- Mara (glider)
- Mintava
- Nameisis (glider)
- Parsla
- Salka (glider)
- Selija (glider)
- Skaubitis
- Skauts
- Skrunda I
- Sloka (glider)
- Spriditis (glider)
- Staburags (glider)
- Tērvete (glider)
- Valmierietis
- Vanadzins
- Vanags (glider)
- Vef-1
- Viesturs (glider)
- YL-12
- YL-13
- YL-14 "fricis tramdachs"
- Zemgale (glider)
- Ziemelnieks
