= List of Portuguese gliders =

This is a list of gliders/sailplanes of the world, (this reference lists all gliders with references, where available) Note: Any aircraft can glide for a short time, but gliders are designed to glide for longer.

== Portuguese miscellaneous constructors ==
- EuroSport Crossover
