= List of Argentine gliders =

This is a list of gliders/sailplanes of the world, (this reference lists all gliders with references, where available) Note: Any aircraft can glide for a short time, but gliders are designed to glide for longer.

== Argentine Miscellaneous constructors ==
- Albatros I - ROSMARIN, Alberto et al.
- Birò Regina
- Degásperi Primario – Argentina – Luis E. Degasperi
- Descole Tío Pelado - Ovidio Descole
- Humek H-2 Metla
- Hunziker Cimarrón – Hunziker, Raúl
- INAV 1 – Horthen, Reimar Inav (Instituto Argentino de Vuelo a Vela)
- Motovelero TA 24 Caracolero
- Planar ASK-18 AR SCHLEICHER, Alexander / Planar Industria Aeronáutica S.A.
- Sancho Primario – Sancho, Orfeo – built by Sancho, Orfeo & Huguenin, Francisco & Huguenin José & Ruiz, Víctor
- Suarez 1895 glider
- Taglioretti RT-1 – Taglioretti, Raúl
- Vásquez Pampero
- Vila Mainene 1 – Vila, Eliseo
