= List of Dutch gliders =

This is a list of gliders/sailplanes of the world, (this reference lists all gliders with references, where available) Note: Any aircraft can glide for a short time, but gliders are designed to glide for longer.

== Netherlands miscellaneous constructors ==
- KANJA Ultra Light Glider
- Nijs & Van Driel T.10
- Akerboom & Schmidt T-10 - J. Akerboom & J. Schmidt
- Akerboom & Schmidt T-10 III - J. Akerboom & J. Schmidt
- Akerboom & Schmidt T-20 - J. Akerboom & J. Schmidt
- Platz Zeilvliegtuig – Platz, Reinhold – Netherlands
- Snellen V-20 – Snellen, Roeland J. – NV Vliegtuigbouw Deventer
- Hoekstra T-20 - J.K. Hoekstra
- Alsema Sagitta - Piet Alsema – NV Vliegtuigbouw Teuge
