= IFIL-Reghin RG-4 Pionier =

RG-4 Pionier

General information
- Type: Primary glider
- National origin: Romania
- Manufacturer: Intreprinderea Forestierǎ di Industrializare a Lemnului (FILI)
- Designer: Vladimir Novitchi
- Number built: 50

History
- First flight: 1 May 1954

The IFIL-Reghin RG-4 Pionier or CIL Reghin RG-4 Pionier was a Romanian single seat primary glider built in the 1950s. Fifty were produced.

== Design and development ==
The RG-4 Pionier was a single seat primary glider built in Romania in the 1950s, though very much in the 1930s Zögling tradition with the pilot exposed on a simple beam fuselage under the leading edge of a high wing. This wing was supported over the fuselage beam on a set of N-form, cross braced struts and by a pair of parallel lift struts on each side to the wing at about one third span. The wing, which was wood framed, was mounted with 2.8° of dihedral, had parallel chord and was unswept. There were plain, fabric covered ailerons out to the wing tips.

The RG-4 landed on a fixed monowheel under the wing trailing edge, with a skid that reached from the nose to under mid chord, assisted by a small tailskid. It had a conventional empennage with a parallel chord tailplane and elevators, similar in plan to the wing, mounted in front of the narrow fin, held above the fuselage on a short step and braced from below with a single strut on each side. Despite its forward position the elevators still required an elevator cut-out for rudder movement. As well as carrying the broad, near triangular rudder, the fin also anchored a pair of bracing wires on each side to reduce horizontal flexing of the fuselage beam. One of these ran to the wing underside, the other to the fuselage under the wing.

The RG-4 Pionier was first flown on 1 May 1954. A batch of fifty was produced.

== Specifications ==
Data from Sailplanes of the World, pp.210-11

General characteristics

- Crew: One
- Length: 5.75 m (18 ft 10 in)
- Wingspan: 10.45 m (34 ft 3 in)
- Height: 1.2 m (3 ft 11 in)
- Wing area: 14.8 m^{2} (159 sq ft)
- Aspect ratio: 7.0
- Airfoil: NACA 60 modified
- Empty weight: 100 kg (220 lb)
- Gross weight: 188 kg (414 lb)

Performance

- Stall speed: 40 km/h (25 mph, 22 kn)
- Never exceed speed: 165 km/h (103 mph, 89 kn) placard, in smooth air
- Rough air speed max: 100 km/h (62 mph; 54 kn)
- Winch launch speed: 90 km/h (56 mph; 49 kn)
- Maximum glide ratio: best 14.5 at 58 km/h (36 mph; 31 kn)
- Rate of sink: 0.90 m/s (177 ft/min) minimum, at 52 km/h (32 mph; 28 kn)
- Wing loading: 12.7 kg/m^{2} (2.6 lb/sq ft)
