= List of Greek gliders =

This is a list of gliders/sailplanes of the world, (this reference lists all gliders with references, where available) Note: Any aircraft can glide for a short time, but gliders are designed to glide for longer.

== Greek miscellaneous constructors ==
- Kourouvakalis-Pikros Anemopsaro (Platon Kourouvakalis & PIKROS, Costas Pikros)
