= König SC 430 =

Aircraft radial engine

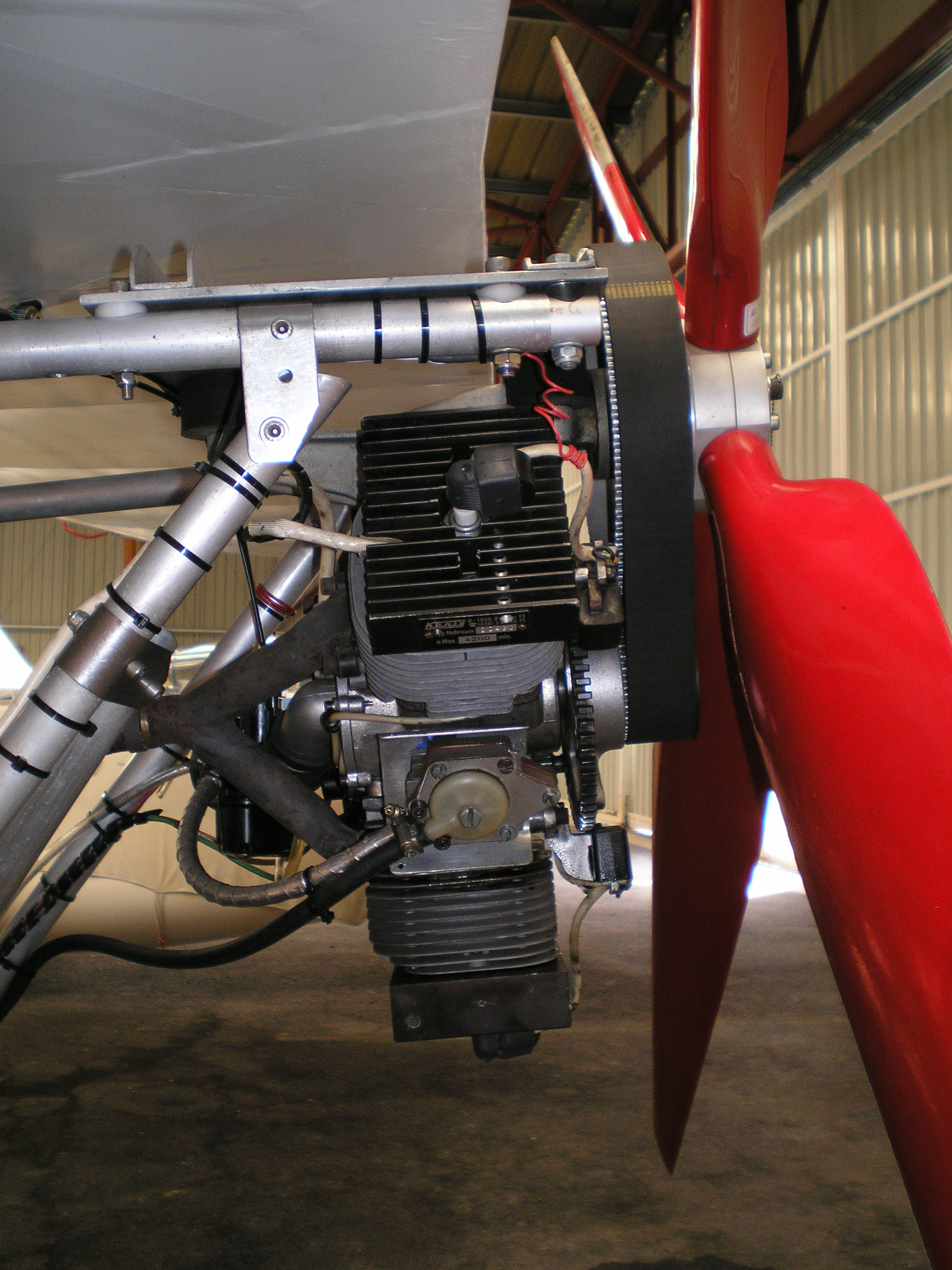
- Type: Two-stroke aircraft engine
- National origin: Germany
- Manufacturer: Dieter König; Zanzottera Technologies; Compact Radial Engines

The König SC 430 is a three-cylinder, two-stroke, single ignition radial aircraft engine designed for powered paragliders and single place ultralight trikes.

The engine was originally designed and produced by Dieter König of Berlin, Germany. The design was sold to Zanzottera Technologies of Italy and then sold again, along with the rest of Zanzottera's two-stroke ultralight aircraft engine line to Compact Radial Engines of Surrey, British Columbia, Canada. Compact Radial Engines was then in turn acquired by Fiate Aviation Co., Ltd. of Hefei, Anhui, China in August 2017. Fiate Aviation did not advertise the engine as available in 2021.

== Development ==
The SC 430 is a unique three cylinder radial engine that is very compact and lightweight at only 17 kg (37 lb). The engine features single capacitor discharge ignition, a single Bing 49 diaphragm type carburetor and rotary valve induction. When last built by Compact Radial Engines it was currently offered without a reduction drive, although when Zanzottera built it a 1.75:1 cog belt reduction drive was available. Starting is electric starter only and a recoil starter is not an option.

Earlier versions produced 24 hp (18 kW) at 4200 rpm with a slide-type carburetor and reduction drive. The Compact Radial Engines version is rated at 20 hp (15 kW) at 4200 rpm. Time between overhaul is rated as 300 hours.

The SC 430 shares the same bore and stroke as the larger four cylinder König SD 570 radial engine.

== Variants ==
Zanzottera SC 430
Three cylinder, two stroke, single ignition, radial aircraft engine producing 24 hp (18 kW) at 4200 rpm. Equipped with a slide-type carburetor and reduction drive.
Compact Radial Engines SC 430
Three cylinder, two stroke, single ignition, radial aircraft engine producing 20 hp (15 kW) at 4200 rpm. Equipped with a Bing 49 diaphragm type carburetor and no reduction drive.

== Applications ==
- Air Est Goeland
- Alpaero Sirius
- Chasle YC-100 Hirondelle
- UTIAS Ornithopter No.1
- Windex 1200

== Specifications (CR 430) ==
Data from Compact Radial Engines

=== General characteristics ===
- Type: Three cylinder, radial two-stroke aircraft engine
- Bore: 66 mm (2.60 in)
- Stroke: 42 mm (1.65 in)
- Displacement: 430 cc (20.75 cu in)
- Dry weight: 17 kg (37 lb)

=== Components ===
- Valvetrain: rotary valve induction
- Oil system: premixed oil and fuel
- Cooling system: air cooled
- Reduction gear: none

=== Performance ===
- Power output: 20 hp (15 kW) at 4200 rpm

== See also ==
- Hirth 3701 - three cylinder in-line
