= List of Finnish gliders =

This is a list of gliders/sailplanes of the world, (this reference lists all gliders with references, where available) Note: Any aircraft can glide for a short time, but gliders are designed to glide for longer.

== Finnish miscellaneous constructors ==
- Adaridi SK-24 - 1924 Finland - ADARIDI, Boris
- Alanne Motorlerche – Pentti Alanne
- Eiri-Avion PIK-20
- Fibera KK-1e Utu – designer Ahto Anttila
- IKV-3 Kotka – Ilmailukerho Vasama – Finland
- Gluhareff 3M – Gluhareff M. S., Helsingfors
- Gluhareff S-22 – Adaridy, H. – Gluhareff M. S., Helsingfors
- Älands Flygklubb glider
- Tervamäki JT-6 TERVAMÄKI, Jukka
- Tervamäki JT-8 TERVAMÄKI, Jukka
