= List of Spanish gliders =

This is a list of glider aircraft made in Spain.

- AeroJaén RF5-AJ1 Serrania – Aeronaútica del Jaén SA
- Cases Libel-lula – Francisco Cases Masia
- CYPA-14
- CYPA-19
- Iberavia IP-2
- Ingeniero Industrial (glider)
- Viana (glider)
- P.L.A.V.I.A. Gurripato II – Gil Cacho and García Ontiveros
- Alfaro ACA 1910
