= List of Turkish gliders =

This is a list of gliders/sailplanes of the world, (this reference lists all gliders with references, where available) Note: Any aircraft can glide for a short time, but gliders are designed to glide for longer.

== Turkish miscellaneous constructors ==
- Galatasaray Kleopatra – Galatasaray High School
- Yildiz 1928 glider – Ali Yildiz
- MKEK 6
