= ICA IS-32 =

IS-32

General information
- Type: Sailplane
- National origin: Romania
- Manufacturer: ICA
- Designer: Iosif Șilimon

History
- First flight: June 1977

The ICA IS-32 is an open class high-performance metal two-seat sailplane produced in Romania in the 1970s. A refinement of the IS-28B, it shared most of that aircraft's fuselage, mated to new wings and empennage. This new wing had a span of 20 metres, featuring interconnected ailerons and flaps, Schempp-Hirth-type airbrakes. It had no provision for water ballast. The monowheel undercarriage differed from the IS-28 in being fully retractable.

== Specifications ==
Data from Jane's All the World's Aircraft 1988-89

General characteristics

- Crew: 2
- Length: 8.36 m (27 ft 5 in)
- Wingspan: 20 m (65 ft 7 in)
- Height: 2.27 m (7 ft 5 in)
- Wing area: 14.68 m^{2} (158.0 sq ft)
- Aspect ratio: 27.25
- Airfoil: root:Wortmann FX 67-K-170; tip: Wortmann FX 67-K-150
- Empty weight: 400 kg (882 lb)
- Max takeoff weight: 590 kg (1,301 lb)

Performance

- Stall speed: 78 km/h (48 mph, 42 kn)
- Never exceed speed: 195 km/h (121 mph, 105 kn) in smooth air
- Max rough air speed: 161 km/h (87 kn; 100 mph)
- Max aero-tow speed: 140 km/h (76 kn; 87 mph)
- Max winch-launch speed: 110 km/h (59 kn; 68 mph)
- g limits: +4 -1.5
- Maximum glide ratio: 44.5
- Best glide speed: 110 km/h (59 kn; 68 mph)
- Rate of sink: 0.62 m/s (122 ft/min) *Minimum sink speed: 90 km/h (49 kn; 56 mph)
- Wing loading: 40.2 kg/m^{2} (8.2 lb/sq ft)
