= List of Danish gliders =

This is a list of gliders/sailplanes of the world, (this reference lists all gliders with references, where available) Note: Any aircraft can glide for a short time, but gliders are designed to glide for longer.

== Danish miscellaneous constructors ==
- Dansk Aero 2G - Dansk Aero's Verkstad
- Ellehammer N°1
- Ellehammer N°3
- Høgslund-Traugott-Olsen 2G
- Høgslund-Olsen 2G
- Projekt 8 Dolphin – Projekt 8 I/S – Helge Petersen et al.
