= IFIL-Reghin RG-5 Pescarus =

Romanian single seat sailplane

RG-5 Pescăruș

General information
- Type: Single seat sailplane
- National origin: Romania
- Manufacturer: Întreprinderea Forestierǎ de Industrializare a Lemnului (FILI)
- Designer: Vladimir Novițchi
- Number built: 26

History
- First flight: 8 September 1957

The IFIL-Reghin RG-5 Pescăruș (English: Herring gull) or CIL Reghin RG-5 Pescăruș was a Romanian single seat sailplane built in the 1950s. Twenty six were constructed for gliding clubs.

== Design and development ==
The RG-5 Pescăruș was a single seat glider designed and built in Romania in the 1950s, intended for club use. It was a mid-wing cantilever monoplane. Like the rest of the aircraft, the wing was wooden, built around a single spar and mounted with 1.66° of dihedral. Plywood skinning from the spar forward and around the leading edge formed a torsion box; the rest of the wing was covered with a mixture of ply and fabric. In plan the wing was symmetrically straight tapered, with squared tips, where there were small tip bodies or plates. It had wood-framed, fabric-covered, balanced ailerons which reached out to the wing tips. DFS (Schempp-Hirth) type airbrakes were mounted at mid-chord, just inboard of the ailerons. There were no flaps.

The RG-5 had a ply monocoque fuselage with its single cockpit ahead of the wing, enclosed by a multipart, sideways-opening canopy which reached to the nose. It landed on a fixed monowheel under mid-wing, with a skid that reached from the nose to under the leading edge, assisted by a small tail bumper. The fuselage tapered markedly from the cockpit aft to a conventional wooden-framed, fabric-covered empennage. Both tailplane and fin were straight edged, with the former mounted forward of the fin at shoulder position and carrying rounded elevators. Together the fin and rudder were flat topped. The rudder hinge was at the trailing edge of the elevators, leaving the rudder, broad and straight edged to its rounded heel, clear to extend down to the keel.

The RG-5 Pescăruș was first flown on 8 September 1957. 26 were produced, going to Romanian gliding clubs.

== Specifications ==
Data from Sailplanes of the World, pp. 211–12

General characteristics

- Crew: One
- Length: 7.38 m (24 ft 3 in)
- Wingspan: 15.10 m (49 ft 6 in)
- Wing area: 15.40 m^{2} (165.8 sq ft)
- Aspect ratio: 14.60
- Airfoil: Göttingen 549 (modified)
- Empty weight: 210 kg (463 lb)
- Gross weight: 300 kg (661 lb)

Performance

- Stall speed: 50 km/h (31 mph, 27 kn)
- Aertowing speed: 120 km/h (75 mph; 65 kn)
- Maximum glide ratio: best 27 at 76 km/h (47 mph; 41 kn)
- Rate of sink: 0.76 m/s (150 ft/min) minimum, at 60 km/h (37 mph; 32 kn)
- Wing loading: 19.5 kg/m^{2} (4.0 lb/sq ft)
