= IIL IS-12 =

IS-12 and IS-13

General information
- Type: Experimental two seat trainer glider
- National origin: Romania
- Manufacturer: Întreprinderea de industrie Locală (IIL)
- Designer: Iosif Șilimon
- Number built: 1 IS-12 and 1 IS-13

History
- First flight: 23 December 1960

The IIL IS-12 was a two-seat glider, designed and built in Romania in 1960. It had a wooden wing but a metal fuselage and was constructed in parallel with the all-wood IS-13 for comparative tests. It was later followed by the IS-13a, a version with an all-metal wing.

== Design and development ==
From about 1950 to his death in February 1981, Iosif Silimon was Romania's most prominent glider designer, his aircraft distinguished by his initials. His tandem two seat IS-12 trainer was a sailplane with a wooden wing and metal fuselage. The IS-13 a variant had a wooden fuselage of slightly changed shape, otherwise differing only in its empennage.

The cantilever high wing common to both models was built around a single spar with a plywood covered torsion box ahead of it around the leading edge. The rest of the wing was fabric covered. It had forward sweep, coming mostly through the strong sweep of the trailing edge as the leading edge was almost straight. Its mass balanced and fabric over ply covered ailerons were slotted and divided into two sections. There were short spoilers, opening both above and below the wing, mounted near mid-chord just inboard of the ailerons. The wing tips carried the small, streamlined bodies known as salmons, common at the time.

The fuselages of both the IS-12 and the IS-13 had oval cross sections, though the IS-12's was narrower by about 20% and correspondingly smaller in area. The IS-12's forward fuselage was a metal monocoque, the rear a steel tube. The IS-13 instead had a plywood monocoque. Both had two seat, tandem cockpits with a moulded perspex canopy in two parts, stretching from a little behind the nose into the wing leading edge. The forward part opened sideways and the aft section was rear hinged. The underside of the IS-13's fuselage curved smoothly, gradually decreasing the diameter towards the tail but that of the IS-12 narrowed more abruptly under the wing. Both models had a short landing skid under the forward fuselage and a semi-recessed, fixed and unsprung monowheel under the wing and fitted with a brake.

Both aircraft had similar but not identical conventional empennages. They had wooden, fabric over ply covered fins and fabric covered, unbalanced rudders. Both fins had straight, slightly swept leading edges and, including the rudder, blunt tops, but the area of the IS-13's fin was increased with a dorsal fillet. Its rudder was slightly squarer at the heel and also larger in area than that of the IS-12. The horizontal tails, mounted on top of the fuselages, were similar straight tapered surfaces but set 130 mm (5.1 in) further forward on the fillet on the IS-13, with the result that the IS-12's cut-out for rudder movement in the elevators was not needed. Both models had a trim tab on the starboard elevator and a tail bumper under the rudder Overall the S-13 was 400 mm (15.7 in) longer.

Despite the different construction and the empennage alterations, the fuselage weights of the two aircraft were very similar with the IS-13 heavier by 5%, so their overall empty weights were the same to within under 2%.

The IS-12 was first flown on 23 December 1960 and the IS-13 flew four days later. The intention was to compare the two in flight testing and select one for production but there is no record of the latter. The performance figures of the two aircraft were almost identical, though the IS-13 had a marginally (2%) lower minimum sink rate.

Five years later a version known as the IS-13a was flown. This had a metal wing of greater (16 m (52 ft 5.9 in)) span, giving it a much improved gliding angle of 35:1. It had a shorter fuselage than either the IS-12 or IS-13, but its method of construction is unknown.

== Variants ==
IS-12
Metal fuselage, wooden wings and empennage. Flown December 1960.
IS-13
Wooden fuselage, wings and empennage. Small changes to tail and a smoother fuselage underside line. Flown December 1960.
IS-13a
Longer span, all-metal wing only 7.10 m (23 ft 3.5 in) long. Best gliding angle of 35:1. Flown 1965.

== Specifications (IS-12) ==
Data from Sailplanes of the World, pp. 206–7

General characteristics

- Crew: Two
- Length: 7.60 m (24 ft 11 in)
- Wingspan: 15.0 m (49 ft 3 in)
- Wing area: 18.0 m^{2} (194 sq ft)
- Aspect ratio: 12.5
- Airfoil: NACA 43015 root, 43012A tip
- Empty weight: 290 kg (639 lb)
- Gross weight: 480 kg (1,058 lb)

Performance

- Stall speed: 58 km/h (36 mph, 31 kn)
- Never exceed speed: 200 km/h (120 mph, 110 kn) placard, in smooth air
- Rough air speed max: 150 km/h (93 mph; 81 kn)
- Aerotow speed: 130 km/h (81 mph; 70 kn)
- Winch launch speed: 90 km/h (56 mph; 49 kn)
- g limits: +5/-3
- Maximum glide ratio: best 24 at 81 km/h (50 mph; 44 kn)
- Rate of sink: 0.92 m/s (181 ft/min) minimum, at 65 km/h (40 mph; 35 kn)
- Wing loading: 26.6 kg/m^{2} (5.4 lb/sq ft)
