= List of Iranian gliders =

This is a list of gliders/sailplanes of the world (this reference lists all gliders with references, where available). Note: Any aircraft can glide for a short time, but gliders are designed to glide for longer.

== Iranian miscellaneous constructors ==
- AII AVA-101 – Aviation Industries of Iran
