= List of Belgian gliders =

This is a list of gliders/sailplanes of the world, (this reference lists all gliders with references, where available) Note: Any aircraft can glide for a short time, but gliders are designed to glide for longer.

== Belgian miscellaneous constructors ==
- Arplam Leuvense L-1 2-seat motor-glider - Leuvense University Aero Club
- Poncelet Castar – Poncelet, Paul – SABCA (Société Anonyme Belge de Construction Aéronautique)
- Poncelet Vivette – Poncelet, Paul – SABCA (Société Anonyme Belge de Construction Aéronautique)
- de Glymes Colanhan
- SABCA Jullien SJ-1 – Jullien, Henri – SABCA (Société Anonyme Belge de Construction Aéronautique)
- SABCA Junior – (Société Anonyme Belge de Construction Aéronautique)
