= CIL Reghin Albatros =

RG-9 Albatros

General information
- Type: Tandem seat glider
- National origin: Romania
- Manufacturer: Complexu Industrializare Lemnului - Reghin
- Designer: Vladimir Novitchi
- Number built: 25

History
- First flight: 1 June 1958

The CIL Reghin RG-9 Albatros was a tandem seat, all wood glider designed and produced in small numbers at the CIL (Complexu Industrializare Lemnului - Reghin) in Romania in the 1950s.

== Design and development ==
The Albatros was a wooden glider with a cantilever mid-set wing. The wings had a root chord of 1.60 m (5 ft 3 in), tapering to 0.66 m (2 ft 2 in) at the tip and carried 1.50° of dihedral. They were built around a single spar with a plywood covered leading edge torsion box in front of it and fabric covered behind. The wing carried wooden, fabric covered ailerons and airbrakes.

The fuselage of the Albatros was a plywood monocoque and the empennage was also wooden and fabric covered, with the tailplane set at the top of the fuselage. The occupants sat in tandem under a continuous canopy with two separately sideways opening sections. It had a fixed undercarriage with two wheels on a short axle under the fuselage and an integral nose skid. At rest, it sat on its wheels and tail.

The Albatros first flew on 1 June 1958. In all, 25 were built.

== Specifications ==
Data from Jane's all the World's Aircraft 1966/7

General characteristics

- Crew: 2
- Length: 7.98 m (26 ft 2 in)
- Wingspan: 16.45 m (54 ft 0 in)
- Wing area: 20 m^{2} (220 sq ft)
- Aspect ratio: 13.5
- Airfoil: Göttingen 535/539
- Empty weight: 290 kg (639 lb)
- Max takeoff weight: 470 kg (1,036 lb)

Performance

- Stall speed: 55 km/h (34 mph, 30 kn)
- Maximum glide ratio: best 25:1 at 79 km/h (49 mph)
- Rate of sink: 0.85 m/s (167 ft/min) best, at 55 km/h (34 mph)
