= List of Indian gliders =

This is a list of gliders/sailplanes of the world, (this reference lists all gliders with references, where available) Note: Any aircraft can glide for a short time, but gliders are designed to glide for longer.

== Indian miscellaneous constructors ==
- HAL G-1 – Hindustan Aeronautics Limited – India
- Hindustan Ardhra – (CAD ATS-1 Ardhra)
- HAL X-241 (HF-24 glider)
