= Bland Mayfly =

Coordinates: 54.67364°N 5.95806°W

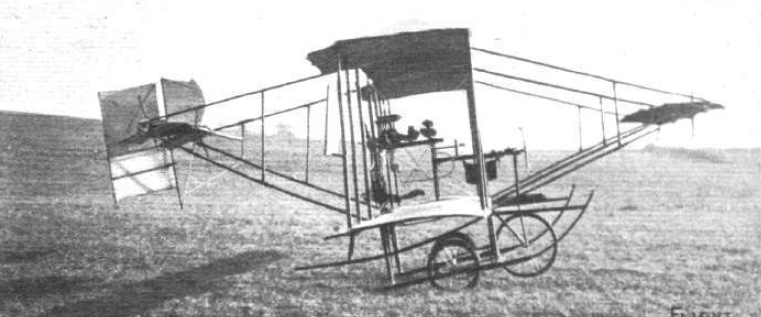

General information
- Type: Sports aircraft
- National origin: United Kingdom
- Manufacturer: Lillian E. Bland
- Number built: 1

History
- First flight: August 1910

The Bland Mayfly was an early aircraft constructed in 1910 by Lilian E. Bland in Carnmoney in Ireland. It is credited as the first aeroplane to be designed and constructed by a woman.

== Background ==
Lillian E. Bland was a sports journalist and photographer. While taking a series of colour photographs of birds on an island off the west coast of Scotland in 1909, she received a postcard bearing an illustration of the Blériot XI aircraft. Already excited by the soaring flight of the gulls she was photographing, she was inspired by the postcard to attempt to construct her own aircraft.

== Design and development ==
Mayfly schematics

Lillian Bland started construction of the Mayfly in the stables of her home during 1909, after making a series of tests with large-scale model gliders. The Mayfly was an equal-span biplane resembling the Farman III in general layout, with a front-mounted elevator and a rear-mounted empennage carried on booms.

The full size aircraft was first flown as a glider from Carnmoney Hill early in 1910, initially unmanned. and with an undercarriage consisting of a pair of skids. These tests being successful, modifications were made to enable an engine to be fitted, and at the same time ailerons were fitted on the rear interplane struts. Bland collected the 20 hp (15 kW) Avro engine from the Avro works in Manchester in mid 1910. When first fitted she had not received the petrol tank, and initial ground trials were conducted by feeding petrol from a whisky bottle via her aunt's ear-trumpet, the only tubing to hand. Trials of the powered aircraft took place at the Deerpark in Randalstown.

The completed Mayfly was a small pusher configuration equal span biplane. Ash was used for the wing spars and the skids, spruce for the ribs and interplane struts, bamboo for the booms carrying the elevator and tail surfaces and the engine mounting was American elm. The wings were covered in unbleached calico, which was laced to the wing structure, allowing it to be tightened when it stretched. (Note: Dope was not developed until 1911) It was powered by a 20 hp (15 kW) air-cooled horizontally opposed two-cylinder engine made by Avro, who also supplied the propeller and various metal fittings used. The forward- mounted elevator was divided into two halves and carried on three pairs of converging booms: behind the wings two paired booms carried a small rectangular fixed tailplane with an elevator either side, and a small fin and rudder. The undercarriage consisted of a pair of long skids bearing a pair of unsprung wheels upon which the aircraft rested: in front of these was a large nosewheel.

Miss Bland wrote a detailed account of the Mayfly for Flight, where she estimates her expenses as totalling less than £200, despite extensive rebuilding and having to replace the propeller, broken when a wire snapped. The power installation was responsible for most of her expenses: only £3-4 was estimated as being necessary for wood, and around £6 for the wheels.

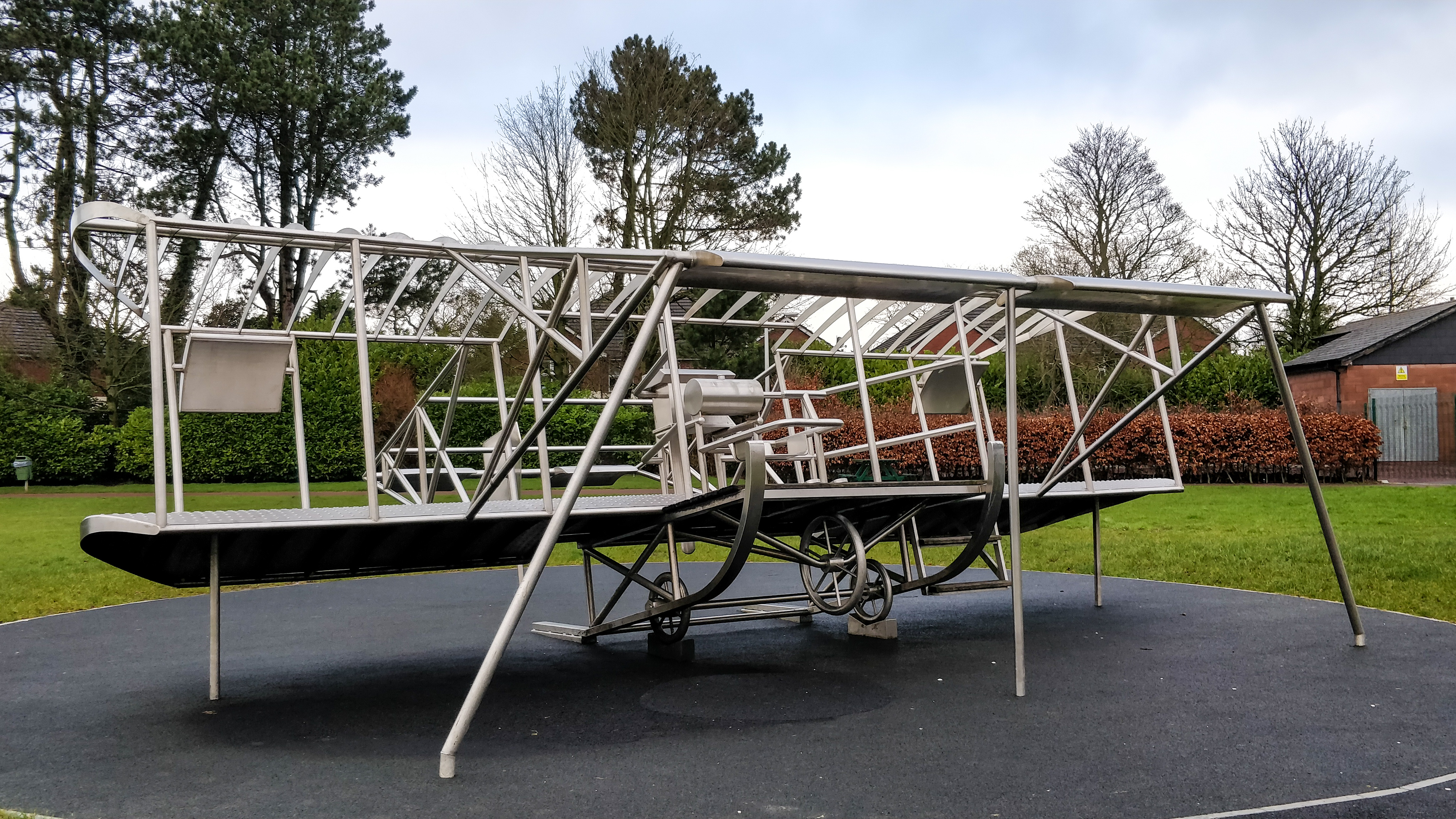
Sculpture of the Mayfly in the Lilian Bland Community Park, Glengormley

The powered aircraft was first flown in August 1910, and was successfully used by Bland until early in 1911, when her father, concerned about her safety, offered to buy her a car if she gave up flying. In 2017, Sinead Morrisey recounts one of Bland's flights in her poem The Mayfly.

Realising that the aircraft was underpowered and too frail to accept a larger engine, and having made her point that aeronautics was not a male preserve, she accepted the bribe. The engine was sold and the airframe given to a boy's club for use as a glider.

Glengormley Park in Newtownabbey was renamed Lillian Bland Community Park in August 2011; at the same time a stainless-steel sculpture of the Mayfly was unveiled.

== Specifications ==
Data from Lewis 1962, p.127

General characteristics

- Crew: 1
- Length: 23 ft 0 in (7.01 m)
- Wingspan: 27 ft 7 in (8.41 m)
- Wing area: 250 sq ft (23 m^{2})
- Empty weight: 200 lb (91 kg) Without engine
- Powerplant: 1 × Avro Air-cooled horizontally-opposed 2-cylinder two-stroke piston engine, 20 hp (15 kW)
- Propellers: 2-bladed Avro, 6 ft 6 in (1.98 m) diameter

== Sources ==
- Lewis, Peter (1962). British Aircraft 1809-1914. London: Putnam.
- Munson, Kenneth (1969). Pioneer Aircraft 1903-1914. London: Blandford.
- Lewis, Peter (23 January 1964). Lilian Bland and the Mayfly.
