= Hatherleigh CAVOK =

Swiss motorglider

CAVOK

General information
- Type: Motor glider
- National origin: Switzerland
- Manufacturer: Hatherleigh Consulting
- Status: Production completed
- Number built: probably prototypes only

History
- First flight: 13 December 2001

The Hatherleigh CAVOK is a Swiss mid-wing, single-seat motor glider that was produced by Heatherleigh Consulting of Bussigny-près-Lausanne, first flying on 13 December 2001.

The aircraft's name is a common aviation meteorology abbreviation meaning Ceiling And Visibility OK and implying good flying weather.

== Design and development ==
The CAVOK project began in the middle of 2000. The primary development model was the CAVOK 10, with a wingspan of 11 m (36.1 ft), extendable to 15 m (49.2 ft) with wing tip extensions. The design goals for the aircraft included maximizing performance for the price, compliance with JAR 22 rules for standard class sailplanes and also European ultralight category rules, including French ULM regulations. Certification was also intended to JAR-VLA standards for countries that lack an ultralight category.

The aircraft is built from fibreglass and features a fixed, fuselage-mounted, single-cylinder, two-stroke Gas Gas motorcycle engine, driving a retractable two-bladed fixed-pitch tractor propeller. The engine can be started and run before extending and engaging the propeller. The wing features flaperons and, unlike most other aircraft in this category, lacks wing-mounted air brakes, the brake being fuselage mounted. The landing gear consists of fixed nose, centre and tail wheels along with auxiliary wheels 5.5 m (18.0 ft) out on the wing from the fuselage. The aircraft is finished in white polyurethane paint.

The aircraft was designed for quick assembly and disassembly by one person without assistance, as no part weighs over 25 kg (55 lb). The aircraft is normally transported by towed trailer.

The last news release the company put out, on 14 December 2002, indicated that development work had been delayed, but was underway at that time. The company website had been removed by 2005 and it is likely that only prototypes were completed and flown.

== Specifications (CAVOK 10) ==
Data from World Directory of Leisure Aviation 2003-04 and company website archives

General characteristics

- Crew: one
- Length: 6.55 m (21 ft 6 in)
- Wingspan: 15.00 m (49 ft 3 in)
- Wing area: 9 m^{2} (97 sq ft)
- Aspect ratio: 25:1
- Empty weight: 160 kg (353 lb)
- Gross weight: 270 kg (595 lb)

Performance

- Cruise speed: 160 km/h (99 mph, 86 kn)
- Stall speed: 64 km/h (40 mph, 35 kn)
- Never exceed speed: 220 km/h (140 mph, 120 kn)
- Maximum glide ratio: 40:1

== See also ==
- List of gliders
