= Iosif Șilimon =

20th century Romanian aircraft designer

- Born: 22 July 1918; Cehu Silvaniei, Szilágy County, Austria-Hungary (now Sălaj County, Romania)
- Died: 8 February 1981 (aged 62); Brașov, Socialist Republic of Romania
- Education: Politehnica University of Bucharest
- Children: 2
- Engineering career
- Discipline: Aircraft design
- Institutions: Industria Aeronautică Română

Iosif Șilimon (22 July 1918 – 8 February 1981) was a Romanian aircraft designer.

== Education and early career ==
He was born in 1918 in Cehu Silvaniei, at the time in Szilágy County, Austria-Hungary, now in Sălaj County, Romania. Șilimon graduated from the Bucharest Aircraft Faculty (the aviation section of the Faculty of the Politehnica University of Bucharest) in 1941. In 1944, at Sânpetru, Șilimon obtained the "C" license, instructed by Gheorghe Brănescu and Nicolae Blebea. In 1947, at Ghimbav, he obtained his "g. II tourism" pilot license, trained by Petre Ticușan.

In 1956, at Sânpetru, Șilimon obtained the "Silver C". From 1962 to 1964 he took the "Golden C" tests. In 1962 he obtained his "Master of Gliding" degree. Between 1956 and 1963 Șilimon participated in eight national selection and national championships, having honorable results. In 1960, Șilimon received the "Paul Tissandier" diploma. In 1964 he participated in the Băneasa Air Show with his self-built IS-3 pipe fuselage glider.

== Professional activity ==
From the IS-2 glider in 1949 until 1981, Șilimon designed and built 32 types of gliders and four motor gliders. Of these, the IS-3D (156 units), IS-28B2 (359 units), IS-29-D2 (156 units) and 34 IS-28B-M2 motor gliders went into mass production. Beside the gliders that made up the passion of his life, he worked as a chief engineer and then technical director at the Ghimbav factory, designed and built hundreds of serial aircraft with classic engines and Alouette and Puma helicopters on a French license. He worked at IAR Brașov from 1941 to 1951 until the aviation section was abolished (starting in 1944, he was head of the cell assembly section); from 1951 to 1959 at URMV-3, the famous hangar 2 of the bomber flotilla in Brașov; from 1959 to 1968 at the Local Industry Enterprise in Ghimbav, aeronautical constructions section; from 1968, he worked at the new facilities of Aviation Construction Industry (ICA) in Ghimbav. He also taught at the Transilvania University of Brașov and wrote "Glider's Flight", an important piece of work for glider pilots (edited in 1971).

== Later years and death ==
Șilimon was dedicated to aeronautical production in Romania, especially during the 1950-1965 period when he strove to maintain the Romanian aviation manufacturing during the reorganization and abolition period. He made the Ghimbav units internationally famous through his outstanding performance, supported by his team. Unfortunately, tragedies did not spare him. He assisted, one by one, at the loss of his two sons, the first, Raul, a student in Medicine in Bucharest, who died in the 4 March 1977 earthquake, and the second, Cristian, a student in the last year of high school, glider pilot, victim of the Sânpetru minibus crash of 4 July 1978. Șilimon manly survived these unjust blows, until the beginning of February 1981, when his heart ceased to beat, after a fatal lung disease, contracted on Ghimbav airfield. After almost two decades after his disappearance, the planes built by him, continue to be the basis for Romanian gliding. A street in Brașov now bears his name.

== Gliders designed ==
- URMV-3 IS-2
- URMV-3 IS-3
- IIL IS-4
- IIL IS-5
- IIL IS-7
- IIL IS-8
- IIL IS-10
- IIL IS-11
- IIL IS-12
- ICA IS-28
- ICA IS-29
- ICA IS-32
