= IIL IS-11 =

Aerobatic, single seat glider

IS-11

General information
- Type: Single seat aerobatic glider
- National origin: Romania
- Manufacturer: Întreprinderea de industrie Locală (IIL)
- Designer: Iosif Șilimon
- Number built: small number

History
- First flight: 16 December 1959

The IIL IS-11 was an aerobatic, single seat glider, designed and built in Romania in 1959. It was built in small numbers.

== Design and development ==
From about 1950 to his death in February 1981, Iosif Silimon was Romania's most prominent glider designer, his aircraft distinguished by his initials. His single seat IS-11 was a wooden, high wing aerobatic sailplane.

The cantilever high wing of the IS-11 was mounted with a dihedral of 2.5°. It was built around a single spar with a plywood covered torsion box ahead of it around the leading edge. The rest of the wing was also ply covered. In plan the wing was symmetrically straight tapered. Its mass balanced ailerons were slotted and fabric over ply covered. The IS-11 had short span spoilers, opening both above and below the wing, mounted at mid-chord just inboard of the ailerons. The wing tips carried the small, streamlined bodies known as salmons, common at the time.

The fuselage of the IS-11 was an oval section plywood monocoque. The pilot sat in a semi-reclining position in a single seat cockpit under a single piece, side opening perspex canopy which, with a short, fixed transparency behind it stretched from the nose into the leading edge of the wing. Its undercarriage comprised a very short, rubber sprung skid under the nose and a fixed, unsprung monowheel semi-recessed into the fuselage under the forward wing and fitted with a brake. From the high wing the fuselage tapered aft to a conventional empennage. A narrow, ply covered fin and a fabric covered rudder which extended down to the keel together formed a straight edged vertical tail with rounded heel and tip. The fin also mounted a straight edged, fabric over ply covered tailplane placed just above the fuselage, carrying straight tapered, similarly skinned elevators. These were balanced by a bob weight within the fuselage and had gaps both at their roots to clear the fin and at their tips to clear rearward tailplane extensions, with a small central cut out for rudder movement. There was a trim tab on the starboard elevator and a tail bumper under the rudder hinge.

The IS-11 was first flown on 16 December 1959 and a few more were built during 1961.

== Specifications ==
Data from Sailplanes of the World, pp.204-5

General characteristics

- Crew: One
- Length: 6.86 m (22 ft 6 in)
- Wingspan: 14.1 m (46 ft 3 in)
- Height: 1.60 m (5 ft 3 in)
- Wing area: 14.5 m^{2} (156 sq ft)
- Aspect ratio: 13.75
- Airfoil: NACA 23015 root, 23012 from mid span outwards
- Empty weight: 240 kg (529 lb)
- Gross weight: 330 kg (728 lb)

Performance

- Stall speed: 60 km/h (37 mph, 32 kn)
- Never exceed speed: 275 km/h (171 mph, 148 kn) placard, in smooth air
- Rough air speed max: 160 km/h (99 mph; 86 kn)
- Aerotow speed: 150 km/h (93 mph; 81 kn)
- Winch launch speed: 100 km/h (62 mph; 54 kn)
- g limits: +6/-4
- Maximum glide ratio: best 24 at 80 km/h (50 mph; 43 kn)
- Rate of sink: 0.82 m/s (161 ft/min) minimum, at 68 km/h (42 mph; 37 kn)
- Wing loading: 23.8 kg/m^{2} (4.9 lb/sq ft)
