= CAVOK (aviation) =

"Ceiling And Visibility OK"

CAVOK (/ˈkæv oʊˈkeɪ/) is a term in aviation meteorology, used outside the US, indicating that cloud ceiling and visibility are satisfactory for VFR flight. It is an abbreviation of Ceiling And Visibility OKay.

The visibility, Runway visual range (RVR), weather and cloud sections of weather forecasts and reports are replaced by the term CAVOK when “all” of the following conditions are met:

1. Prevailing visibility 10 km (6.2 miles) or more
2. No minimum visibility reported
3. No clouds below 5000 ft (1.5 km) or below Minimum Sector Altitude (MSA), whichever is greater
4. No TCU (towering cumulus) or CB (cumulonimbus) clouds
5. No significant (SIG) weather phenomena in or around the aerodrome

== Flight safety considerations ==
Some pilots are under the misconception that the sky is clear when they see CAVOK. The sky may be completely overcast above 5000 ft or MSA (whichever is greater) in CAVOK conditions.

Another important consideration is the amendment to Terminal aerodrome forecast (TAF). TAFs are not corrected unless the cloud ceiling falls below 1500 ft AAL. Therefore, the cloud ceiling at an aerodrome that appears as CAVOK in the TAF may in reality be closer to 1500 ft.

== Notes ==
- Pooley, Dorothy ve Robert Seaman. The Air Pilot's Manual 2: Aviation Law & Meteorology. 10th edition. Shoreham, West Sussex: Pooley's Air Pilot Publishing, 2011.
