= IIL IS-4 =

Single seat, high performance sailplane

IS-4

General information
- Type: Single seat Standard Class Sailplane
- National origin: Romania
- Manufacturer: Intreprinderea de Industrie Locală (IIL) / Uzinele de Reparatii Material Volant-3 (URMV-3) at Brașov
- Designer: Iosif Șilimon

History
- First flight: 5 June 1959

The IIL IS-4 was a single seat, high performance sailplane designed by Iosif Șilimon and built in Romania in the late 1950s.

== Design and development ==
From about 1950 to his death in February 1981, Iosif Șilimon was Romania's most prominent glider designer, his aircraft distinguished by his initials. The IS-4 first flew on 5 June 1959. It was a high wing cantilever monoplane with an all wood structure and was largely plywood skinned. The wings, mounted with 2.5° of dihedral, were double straight tapered, with a little more taper outboard and an almost unswept leading edge. They were built around a single spar with a forward torsion box between it and the leading edge. The tips carried the small streamlined bodies known as salmons, common at the time. Ply and fabric covered ailerons ran from the tips over the more tapered outboard panels, with mid-chord spoilers immediately inboard, opening above and below the wing.

The fuselage was a plywood monocoque, tapering to the tail. A single piece, side hinged, moulded perspex canopy enclosed the single seat cockpit from the nose to the leading edge, with an additional small roof transparency aft of the leading edge. The empennage was conventional, with a straight tapered tailplane mounted on a small step above the fuselage, carrying straight edged elevators with gaps at their roots between elevator and fin and at the tips between them and rearward extension of the tailplane tips. The elevators were mass balanced by a weight within the fuselage but not aerodynamically balanced. A narrow fin with a small forward fillet rose above the tailplane to the full height of the rudder, which was broad with a rounded heel, flat tipped and also unbalanced. The rudder extended down to the keel, requiring a cut-out in the aft part of the elevators for its movement. Like the ailerons the horizontal tail was covered with fabric over ply but the fin was simply ply skinned and the rudder fabric covered. The IS-4 had a short, rubber sprung skid reaching from the nose to under about mid-canopy and a fixed, unsprung monowheel under the wing, fitted with a brake. There was also a small tail bumper, protecting the bottom of the rudder.

The IS-4 was the first Romanian sailplane designed to meet FAI Standard Class rules.

== Specifications ==
Data from The World's Sailplanes (1963), pp.192-3, Romanian Aircraft Constructions 1905-1974

General characteristics

- Crew: One
- Length: 7.10 m (23 ft 4 in)
- Wingspan: 15.0 m (49 ft 3 in)
- Height: 1.6 m (5 ft 3 in)
- Wing area: 14.0 m^{2} (151 sq ft)
- Aspect ratio: 16.0
- Airfoil: Göttingen 549 apart from tip Göttingen 693
- Empty weight: 220 kg (485 lb) equipped
- Gross weight: 320 kg (705 lb)

Performance

- Stall speed: 60 km/h (37 mph, 32 kn)
- Never exceed speed: 180 km/h (110 mph, 97 kn) placard, smooth air
- Rough air speed max: 150 km/h (93 mph; 81 kn)
- Aerotow speed: 120 km/h (75 mph; 65 kn)
- Winch launch speed: 90 km/h (56 mph; 49 kn)
- Maximum glide ratio: 30:1 at 80 km/h (50 mph; 43 kn)
- Rate of sink: 0.64 m/s (126 ft/min) minimum, at 67 km/h (42 mph; 36 kn)
- Wing loading: 22.9 kg/m^{2} (4.7 lb/sq ft)
