= URMV-3 IS-3 =

IS-3

General information
- Type: Sailplane
- National origin: Romania
- Manufacturer: URMV-3
- Designer: Iosif Șilimon

History
- First flight: 19 August 1953 (IS-3); 16 May 1955 (IS-3a); 19 June 1955 (IS-3b); 4 October 1957 (IS-3c); 18 September 1956 (IS-3d); 22 May 1958 (IS-3f)

The IS-3 was the basis of a family of high performance gliders designed by Iosif Șilimon and built in Romania in the 1950s at the URMV-3 (Rom: Uzinele de Reparatii Material Volant-3 - Glider repair and manufacture factory) factory at Brașov.

== Design and development ==
The IS-3 was designed as a high performance sailplane for record-breaking and international competition flying. The development of the IS-3 was in four distinct phases with differences in wing position and construction as well as fuselage design. The original glider, first flown on 19 August 1953, was built primarily of wood with a pod and boom style fuselage and high-set wings. The streamlined pod contained the enclosed cockpit with a flush-fitting canopy and supported the wings and the Duralumin sheet tubular tailboom, which supported the conventional tail surfaces at its extremity. The tapered wings were built with plywood-covered torsion box leading edges with fabric covering aft of the main spar, incorporating spoilers for approach control and differential ailerons to reduce adverse yaw. With the exception of the IS-3c and IS-3d the IS-3 family followed the pod and boom arrangement with variations in wing position, span, wing construction and undercarriage arrangement.

All versions had a single mainwheel with nose and tail skids, varying in skid sizes and mainwheel position. The IS-3c and IS-3d were drastically different in having a conventional wooden fuselage and further minor variations in wing construction and roll controls.

== Operational history ==
Data from: Romanian Aeronautical Constructions 1905-1974

IS-3
The IS-3 set several national records, at a 1954 international gliding contest at Leszno in Poland and at other times:
- Speed - 74.5 km/h (46.3 mph; 40.2 kn) over a 300 km (186.4 mi; 162.0 nmi) straight line with reference point, piloted by Mircea Finescu at Lesno.
- Distance - 305 km (189.5 mi; 164.7 nmi) straight line with reference point, piloted by Mircea Finescu at Leszno.
- Speed - 72.3 km/h (44.9 mph; 39.0 kn) over a 100 km (62.1 mi; 54.0 nmi) triangular circuit, piloted by Mircea Finescu at Leszno.
- Speed - 72.3 km/h (44.9 mph; 39.0 kn) over a 100 km (62.1 mi; 54.0 nmi) with reference point, piloted by Ovidiu Popa.
- Distance (women) - 325.6 km (202.3 mi; 175.8 nmi) straight line between Iași and Cuza Vodă, Călărași, piloted by Aurelia Roșianu-Gheorghiu.
IS-3d
The IS-3d set several national records:
- Speed - 48.42 km/h (30.1 mph; 26.1 kn) over a 200 km (124.3 mi; 108.0 nmi) triangular circuit, piloted by Ovidiu Popa.
- Speed - 83.82 km/h (52.1 mph; 45.3 kn) over a 100 km (62.1 mi; 54.0 nmi) with reference point, piloted by Gheorghe Gilcă.
- Speed (women) - 48.425 km/h (30.1 mph; 26.1 kn) over a 100 km (62.1 mi; 54.0 nmi) triangular circuit, piloted by Aurelia Roșianu-Gheorghiu.

== Variants ==
Data from: Romanian Aeronautical Constructions 1905-1974

IS-3
Original prototype with high-set 16 m (52.5 ft) span wings on a pod and boom fuselage, with two part differential ailerons and non-speed-limiting airbrakes/spoilers.
IS-3a
A revised IS-3 with wings lowered to the mid position and tailboom also lowered. The IS-3a wings were similar to the plywood D-box and fabric-covered aft section of the IS-3 but incorporated flaps with two part differential ailerons and non-speed-limiting airbrakes/spoilers.
IS-3b
The IS-3b was essentially identical to the IS-3a with the exception of having no flaps and having plywood skinned wings throughout.
IS-3c
The IS-3c was markedly different from its predecessors in having high-set 17 m (55.8 ft) span wings, skinned throughout with plywood, with three-section differential ailerons and introducing speed-limiting airbrakes. The new long span wing was supported by a conventional fuselage, incorporating the streamlined enclosed cockpit and a conventional tail unit.
IS-3d
Essentially similar to the IS-3c, but with a 15.3 m (50.2 ft) wing, single-section ailerons, streamlined wingtip fairings, and speed-limiting airbrakes.
IS-3e
Reverting to the pod and boom layout the IS-3e had high-set 17 m (55.8 ft) span wings, with a plywood D-box and fabric-covered aft section, two section ailerons and speed limiting airbrakes.
IS-3f
A variant with a 15.3 m (50.2 ft) wing completely skinned with plywood, otherwise similar to the IS-3e.

== Specifications (IS-3) ==
Data from The World's Sailplanes:Die Segelflugzeuge der Welt:Les Planeurs du Monde Volume II

General characteristics

- Crew: 1
- Length: 6.46 m (21 ft 2 in) (IS-3)

6.66 m (21 ft 10 in) (IS-3a / IS-3b)
7.26 m (23 ft 10 in) (IS-3c / IS-3d)
7.0 m (23 ft 0 in) (IS-3e / IS-3f)

- Wingspan: 16 m (52 ft 6 in) (IS-3 / IS-3a / IS-3b)

17 m (55 ft 9 in) (IS-3c / IS-3e)
15.03 m (49 ft 4 in) (IS-3d / IS-3f)

- Height: 1.43 m (4 ft 8 in) (IS-3 )

1.6 m (5 ft 3 in) (IS-3a / IS-3b / IS-3c / IS-3d / IS-3e / IS-3f)

- Wing area: 16.0 m^{2} (172 sq ft)
- Aspect ratio: 16 (IS-3 / IS-3a / IS-3b / IS-3e)

18 (IS-3c)
15.3 (IS-3d / IS-3f)

- Airfoil: Root:NACA 23015, Mid NACA 23012, Tip NACA 23012
- Empty weight: 215 kg (474 lb) (IS-3)

245 kg (540 lb) (IS-3a / IS-3b)
270 kg (595 lb) (IS-3c / IS-3e)
230 kg (507 lb) (IS-3d / IS-3f)

- Gross weight: 305 kg (672 lb) (IS-3)

335 kg (739 lb) (IS-3a / IS-3b)
360 kg (794 lb) (IS-3c / IS-3e)
320 kg (705 lb) (IS-3d / IS-3f)

Performance

- Stall speed: 50 km/h (31 mph, 27 kn) (IS-3 / IS-3a)

58 km/h (36 mph; 31 kn) (IS-3b)
52 km/h (32 mph; 28 kn) (IS-3c)
56 km/h (35 mph; 30 kn) (IS-3d)
61 km/h (38 mph; 33 kn) (IS-3e)
59 km/h (37 mph; 32 kn) (IS-3f)

- Never exceed speed: 180 km/h (110 mph, 97 kn) (IS-3 / IS-3a / IS-3b / IS-3e)

200 km/h (124 mph; 108 kn) (IS-3c / IS-3d / IS-3f)

- Rough air speed max: 140 km/h (87 mph; 76 kn) (IS-3 / IS-3a / IS-3b / IS-3e)

150 km/h (93 mph; 81 kn) (IS-3c / IS-3d / IS-3f)

- Aerotow speed: 120 km/h (75 mph; 65 kn)
- Winch launch speed: 90 km/h (56 mph; 49 kn)
- Terminal velocity: with full air-brakes at max all-up weight 200 km/h (124 mph; 108 kn) ('IS-3c)

185 km/h (115 mph; 100 kn) (IS-3d / IS-3e / IS-3f)

- g limits:

+4 -2.2 at 205 km/h (110.7 kn) (IS-3 / IS-3a / IS-3b / IS-3c /IS-3e)
+5 -3 at 250 km/h (135.0 kn) (IS-3d / IS-3f)

- Maximum glide ratio: 29.5 at 81 km/h (50 mph; 44 kn) (IS-3)

28.5 at 81 km/h (50 mph; 44 kn) (IS-3a)
29 at 83 km/h (52 mph; 45 kn) (IS-3b)
28.5 at 79 km/h (49 mph; 43 kn) (IS-3c)
28 at 75 km/h (47 mph; 40 kn) (IS-3d)
28.9 at 82 km/h (51 mph; 44 kn) (IS-3e)
29.6 at 100 km/h (62 mph; 54 kn) (IS-3f)

- Rate of sink: 0.68 m/s (134 ft/min) at 42.3 mph; 36.7 kn (68 km/h) (IS-3)

0.7 m/s (137.8 ft/min) at 68 km/h (42 mph; 37 kn) (IS-3a)
0.71 m/s (139.8 ft/min) at 69 km/h (43 mph; 37 kn) (IS-3b)
0.7 m/s (137.8 ft/min) at 65 km/h (40 mph; 35 kn) (IS-3c)
0.68 m/s (133.9 ft/min) at 63 km/h (39 mph; 34 kn) (IS-3d)
0.7 m/s (137.8 ft/min)(IS-3e)
0.7 m/s (137.8 ft/min) at 67 km/h (42 mph; 36 kn) (IS-3f)

- Wing loading: 19.1 kg/m^{2} (3.9 lb/sq ft) (IS-3)

21 kg/m^{2} (4.301 lb/sqft) (IS-3a)
20.6 kg/m^{2} (4.22 lb/sqft) (IS-3b)
22.5 kg/m^{2} (4.61 lb/sqft) (IS-3c)
22.4 kg/m^{2} (4.59 lb/sqft) (IS-3d)
22.5 kg/m^{2} (4.61 lb/sqft) (IS-3e)
20.9 kg/m^{2} (4.28 lb/sqft) (IS-3)
