= Beatty-Johl BJ-2 Assegai =

BJ-2 Assegai

General information
- Type: Single seat competition sailplane
- National origin: South Africa
- Designer: W.A.T. Johl and P.J Beatty
- Number built: 1

History
- First flight: January 1961

The Beatty-Johl BJ-2 Assegai was a single seat, high performance competition glider built in South Africa in the early 1960s. Only one was built; it was optimised for South African conditions and performed well there, winning two nationals and setting several records, but was less successful under European conditions at the 1965 World Gliding Championships.

== Design and development ==
The BJ-2 was a successor to the BJ-1, a 60 ft (18.3 m) span glider on which design began in South Africa in 1945 but abandoned before completion as it became clear that the new laminar flow airfoil sections offered better performance. The BJ-2 used one of the 65 series airfoils in conjunction with Fowler flaps. Its design, led by W.A.T. Johl, concentrated on high cross country glide speeds, achieved via a high wing loading and low camber, important in South African gliding conditions with strong thermals and long flights between them. Design work started in 1955 but the BJ-2 was not flown until January 1961, piloted and chiefly built by P.J.Beatty.

The BJ-2 was an almost entirely wooden aircraft, both internally and with a plywood skin on all surfaces. The single spar, 50 ft (15.24 m) span, shoulder mounted wings had three pieces, the centre one with a span of 30 ft 1 in (9.17 m), rectangular in plan, the NACA 65 wing section and no dihedral. The outer pieces were trapezoidal and had 5° dihedral, changing to a non-laminar section at the tip, with the ailerons filling all their trailing edge. The centre panel trailing edge was filled with Fowler flaps, which at maximum, 30° extension increased both the camber and the wing area, the latter by 19.5%, for low speed flight in thermals. Small wing tip bodies were added later.

Its fuselage was a semi-monocoque structure, elliptical in cross-section and tapering uniformly towards the tail. The fin and rudder together were trapezoidal, with a T tail and elevator of constant chord within tapered tips. Lacking the more usual wing mounted airbrakes, the BJ-2 had a pair of petal type, fuselage mounted brakes for glide angle control just aft of the wing. It also had two cruciform braking parachutes deployable from the lower rear fuselage below the rudder. Forward of the wing the upper fuselage line blended smoothly into that of the single piece, sideways opening canopy to limit dive speeds. The undercarriage combined a retractable monowheel, fitted with a brake, and a co-retracting forward skid. The nose was of glass reinforced plastic.

Camber changing Fowler flaps had been used before on gliders, notably on the 1938 Akaflieg Hannover AFH-4 and the 1948 Cijan-Obad Orao II, though not fitted to this design's later version. Whilst they provided the increased camber needed for low speed climbs, they also increased drag, both by reducing the aspect ratio, raising the induced drag, and by the creation of extra vortexes at the outer ends of the flaps. This penalty was less costly in typically strong South African thermals than in the weaker ones found in northern Europe.

The BJ-2 proved to have the intended high speed performance, demonstrated in a series of closed circuit and out and back flights. The fuselage mounted airbrakes proved rather ineffective.

== Operational history ==
The BJ-2's first competitive appearance was at the South African Nationals held from late December 1961 to early January 1962. Flown by Pat Beattie, it came third overall but was the highest placed South African aircraft, making him the national champion. During the competition he set an unofficial world record round a 400 km triangular course at a speed of 102.3 km/h (63.6 mph) and made a 600 km (373 km) out and return flight at 90 km/h (56 mph).

After this the BJ-2 was flown by Bert Dommisse, who completed a 500 km triangle, now an officially FAI recognised pattern, at a record speed of 107.5 km/h (66.8 mph) just before competing with it in the 1963/4 South African Nationals, when he became national champion.

In 1965 the BJ-2 was flown by Dommisse at the World Gliding Championships at South Cerney in the United Kingdom. English conditions, with weak thermals, were not what it was designed for and it finished well down the field.

== Specifications ==
Data from Jane's All the World's Aircraft1962-63 The World's Sailplanes:Die Segelflugzeuge der Welt:Les Planeurs du Monde Volume II

General characteristics

- Crew: 1
- Length: 23 ft 2 in (7.06 m)
- Wingspan: 50 ft 0 in (15.24 m)
- Wing area: 127 sq ft (11.8 m^{2}) flaps up, 151 sq ft (14.04 m³) extended
- Aspect ratio: 19.77, flaps up, 17.3 extended
- Airfoil: NACA 65_{3}418 at root, NACA2410 (modified) at tip
- Empty weight: 675 lb (306 kg) equipped
- Max takeoff weight: 855 lb (388 kg)

Performance

- Stall speed: 41 mph (66 km/h, 36 kn) flaps 0°, 61 km/h (37.9 mph; 32.9 kn) flaps 10°, 57 km/h (35.4 mph; 30.8 kn) flaps 20°, 53 km/h (32.9 mph; 28.6 kn) flaps 30°
- Never exceed speed: 147 mph (236 km/h, 127 kn) smooth air flaps up, 158 km/h (98.2 mph; 85.3 kn) flaps 30°
- Rough air speed max: 158 km/h (98.2 mph; 85.3 kn) flaps up, 107 km/h (66.5 mph; 57.8 kn) flaps 30°
- Aerotow speed: 100 km/h (62.1 mph; 54.0 kn) flaps 5°
- g limits: +4 -2
- Maximum glide ratio: best 37.5:1 at 61 mph (52.9 km;98 km/h)
- Rate of sink: 126 ft/min (0.64 m/s) minimum at 45 mph (39.1 kn;72.5 km/h)
- Wing loading: 6.86 lb/sq ft (33.5 kg/m^{2})
