= List of Hungarian gliders =

This is a list of gliders/sailplanes of the world, (this reference lists all gliders with references, where available) Note: Any aircraft can glide for a short time, but gliders are designed to glide for longer.

== Hungarian miscellaneous constructors ==
=== Pre-war Hungarian Sportflying organisations and workshops ===
- MAESZ – Magyar Aero Szövetség (Hungarian Aero Association)
- Esztergom Flying Society of MOVERO (Hungarian acronym for the Flying Section of Hungarian National Home Guard)
- MSrE – Mûegyetemi Sportrepülõ Egyesület (Sportfying Club of the Technical University of Budapest)
- Aero Ever Kft. 1938–1948
- HMNRA – Horthy Miklós Nemzeti Repülõ Alap (Horthy Miklós National Aviation Foundation)

=== Post war Hungarian Sportflying organisations and workshops ===
- OMRE – Országos Magyar Repülö Egyesület (National Hungarian Flying Association) 1948–1951
  - OMRE Központi Repülögépjavító Üzem, Budaörs – (Central Aircraft Repair Plant of the OMRE, Budaörs) 1948–1951
  - OMRE Központi Repülögépjavító Üzem, Dunakeszi (Central Aircraft Repair Plant of the OMRE, Dunakeszi) 1948–1951
  - OMRE Központi Javító Műhelyében
- MRSz – Magyar Repülö Szövetség (Hungarian Aeronautical Association) (took over OMRE in 1951)
  - MRSz Központi Repülögépjavító Üzem, Mátyásföld (Central Aircraft Repair Plant of the MRSz, Mátyásföld) 1951–1955
  - MRSz Központi Repülögépjavító Üzem, Dunakeszi (Central Aircraft Repair Plant of the MRSz, Dunakeszi) 1951–1955
- AKKÜ – Alagi Központi Kisérleti Üzem – (Central Experimental Plant, Alag). 1955–1958
- Sportárutermelõ Vállalat (Factory of Sport Appliances). 1948–1957
- EMESE Experimental Aircraft Factory
- Labor Mûszeripari Mûvek Esztergomi Gyáregysége (Subsidiary of the "Labor" Industrial Instrument Works), 1957–1958
- Pestvidéki Gépgyár Esztergomi Gyáregysége (Esztergom Facility of the Pest-Area Machine Factory), 1958–1969

=== Hungarian gliders ===
- Adorján Libelle
- Cinke – Hungary – modified DFS Meise
- E-31 Esztergom – Esztergom Facility of Pest Area Machine Factory (PGE) (formerly Sportárutermelõ V., Esztergom)
- EV-1K Fecske – Esztergom Facility of Pest Area Machine Factory (PGE) (formerly Sportárutermelõ V., Esztergom)
- Gribovszkij G-9 Dzsunka – Gribovszki G-9 Dzsunka built under licence
- Gyõr-2 – Aeroclub of the Rolling-stock Factory, Gyõr
- Gyõr-3 Motor-Pilis – Aeroclub of the Rolling-stock Factory, Gyõr
- Horváth III
- Kemény K-02 Szellõ – Sándor Kemeny – MÁV Istvántelki Fõmûhely, Sportárutermelõ V. (former Aero Ever Ltd.), Esztergom
- Kesselyàk KM-400 – Kesselyak, Mihály – Workshop of the Airplane Service of the Hungarian Agricultural Ministry, Nyiregyháza
- Király-Berkovice I
- Kolbányi V
- Lampich LS-16 – Árpád Lampich
- Lányi Az Ket biplán
- Létai IV-Minár
- OMRE Bene – Hugó NAGY – OMRE – Országos Magyar Repülö Egyesület Központi Javító Műhelyében, Budapesten – Hungarian National Flying Association Budapest
- OMRE OE-01 – (a.k.a. Rubik R-20) – Papp, M. & Rubik, Ernõ – OMRE Központi Javító Műhelyében, Budapesten – Hungarian National Flying Association Budapest
- Pfitzner Amerik-Gép
- Prodam III Hadi
- Racek 3 Möwe
- R–03 Szittya I
- R–04 Szittya II
- R–10 Szittya III
- R–07a Tücsök
- R–07b Vöcsök
- R–08 Pilis
- R–11 Cimbora
- R–12 Kevély
- Rubik R-15 Koma
- Rubik R-16 Lepke
- R–17 Móka
- Rubik R–21 (military transport)
- R–22 Futár
- R–22S Június 18.
- R–23 Gébics
- R–24 Bibic
- R–25 Mokány
- R–253
- R-254 (E–31) Esztergom
- Rubik R-26 Góbé
- R–27 Kópé
- Rubik R-31 Dupla
- Suranyi-Hegedús I
- Svachulay Albatross
- Svachulay Szent György
- SZ-10 Horak
- Székely Parasol
- Takács III
- Tóth Furnér-Gép
- Vándor – Zoltán JANKA – Lajos Rotter – MOVERO workshop, Gyöngyös
- Zsélyi 2
