= PGE E-31 Esztergom =

Single-seat training glider used in Hungary

E-31 Esztergom
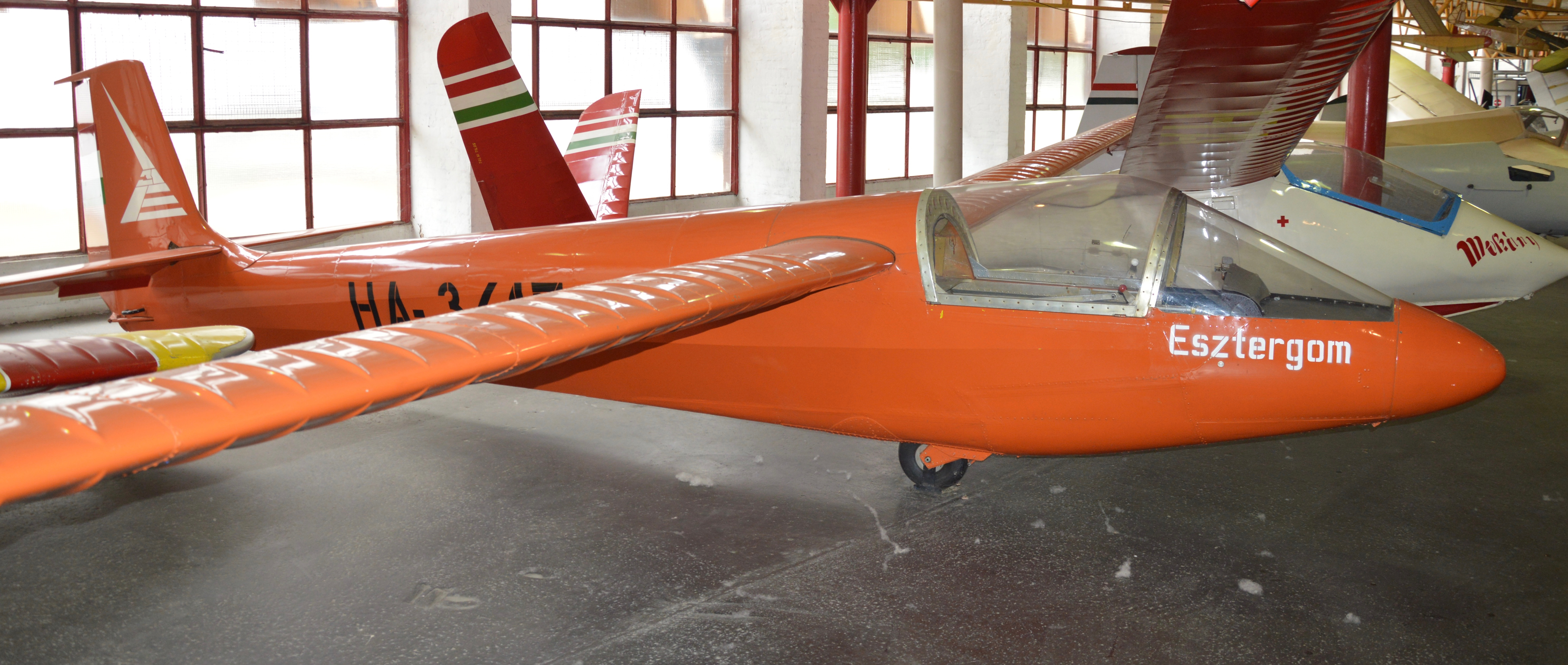
- E-31 in the Kozlekedesi Transportation Museum, Budapest

General information
- Type: Single seat training glider
- National origin: Hungary
- Manufacturer: Esztergom Facility of Pest County Machine Works (PGE)
- Designer: Pál Kerekes
- Number built: 55

History
- First flight: 21 March 1966

The E-31 Esztergom was the standard single-seat training glider used in Hungary from about 1967 into the 1980s. Fifty were produced.

== Design and development ==
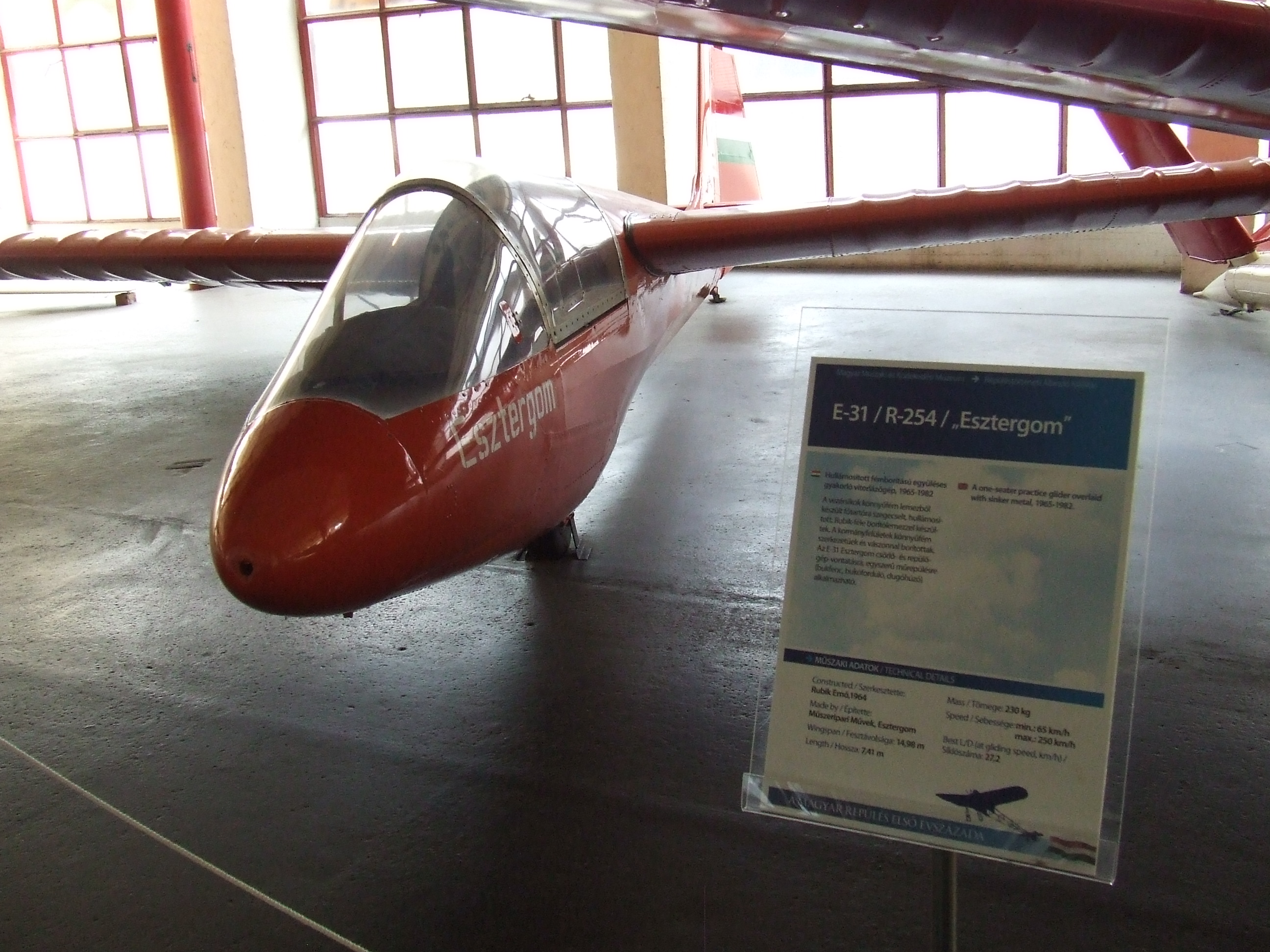

In the early 1960s the Rubik R-25 Mokany was designed to fill the role of single-seat trainer but did not have the performance required and was not produced. In 1964 the Magyar Hosszúkardvívó Sportszövetség (MHS), the organization controlling sport flying in Hungary, made another attempt to provide a suitable aircraft. Using a fuselage similar to that of the Rubik R-27 Kópé, the PGE team designed three different wings, fitted and tested in turn. The resulting designs were referred to as the R-252, with an all-metal wing and DFS airbrakes, the R-253 with a central region rectangular in plan and trailing edge airbrakes and the R-254 with the original Mokany wing but with DFS airbrakes rather than fuselage-based airbrakes.

The construction of the R-253 was delayed by design modifications, so with the MHS pressing for production to start, the R-252 and R-254 underwent competitive testing in early 1965. Their performances were similar and only a little better than the Mokany; the R-254 climbed better in narrow thermals so was selected for production and became known as the E-31 Esztergom, named after the city north of Budapest where it was built. Tested later, the R-253 outperformed the other two but pitched unsteadily when the airbrakes were opened.

Structurally, the Esztergom was an all-metal aircraft. Its straight-tapered, cantilever shoulder wing had forward sweep on the trailing edge alone. It was built around a single dural spar with corrugated dural covering ahead of it forming a torsion-resistant D-box. The wing was fabric-covered aft of the spar. Frise ailerons occupied about a quarter of the span and DFS-type airbrakes were placed inboard just behind the spar.

The forward part of the fuselage was based around a dural keel which stretched back aft of the wings, connected to the wings by a pair of backward-leaning frames. The pilot's seat was on the keel under a long, blown-plexiglass canopy with a fixed windscreen and a side-hinged rear part which reached back to the leading edge. The rear fuselage was built around a semi-circular section tube which formed the upper half. Below it formers and frames shaped the fabric-covered underside.

The tail unit was different from that of the Kópé. Its fin was broad and angular, with a small fillet at its base. This mounted a narrow, rectangular tailplane with narrow, slightly tapered elevators, well ahead of a broad, angular rudder. The fixed surfaces were dural-covered and the control surfaces fabric-covered.

The Esztergom landed on a fixed, rubber-sprung monowheel just forward of the wing leading edge and a short tailskid.

== Operational history ==
Five pre-production Esztergoms were built, followed by a production run of fifty. Though its performance was below specification, the single-seat, Standard Class Esztergom served as the next step in pilot training after the two-seat Rubik R-26 Góbé basic trainer for over a decade. Until the early 1980s it was certified for basic aerobatics. Some speed limits were lowered in 1992, for example VNE was lowered from 250 km/h (160 mph; 130 kn) to 180 km/h (110 mph; 97 kn) and the maximum in rough air from 165 km/h (103 mph; 89 kn) to 140 km/h (87 mph; 76 kn).

One remained airworthy in Hungary until at least 2004, and four production Esztergoms appear on the 2014 Hungarian Civil Register. One of the five pre-production aircraft (HA-4304) was being restored in 2004 at North Adams Airport in the US.

== Aircraft on display ==
- E-31 Esztergom (HA-3417), Hungarian Technical and Transportation Museum.

== Specifications ==
Data from Gabor, F

General characteristics

- Crew: One
- Length: 7.41 m (24 ft 4 in)
- Wingspan: 14.98 m (49 ft 2 in)
- Wing area: 11.25 m^{2} (121.1 sq ft)
- Aspect ratio: 20
- Airfoil: Modified NACA 643-618
- Empty weight: 230 kg (507 lb)
- Gross weight: 330 kg (728 lb)
- Dihedral: 3°

Performance

- Maximum speed: 180 km/h (110 mph, 97 kn) VNE and maximum with airbrakes open, post 1992.
- Stall speed: 65 km/h (40 mph, 35 kn)
- Maximum glide ratio: 27 best, at 81 km/h (50 mph; 44 kn)
- Rate of sink: 0.8 m/s (160 ft/min) at 69 km/h (43 mph; 37 kn)
- Maximum speed in rough air: 140 km/h (87 mph; 76 kn) post 1992
