= R27 =

R27 may refer to:

== Missiles ==
- R-27 (air-to-air missile), a Soviet air-to-air missile
- R-27 Zyb, a Soviet submarine-launched ballistic missile

== Roads ==
- R-27 regional road (Montenegro)
- R27 (South Africa)

== Other uses ==
- R27 (New York City Subway car)
- BMW R27, a motorcycle
- HMA R.27, a rigid airship of the Royal Air Force
- HMS Croziers (R27), a destroyer of the Royal Navy
- R27: Very toxic in contact with skin, a risk phrase
- Renault R27, a Formula One racing car
- Rubik R-27 Kópé, a Hungarian training glider
- USS R-27 (SS-104), a submarine of the United States Navy
