= Foundry Museum =

Museum in Budapest, Hungary

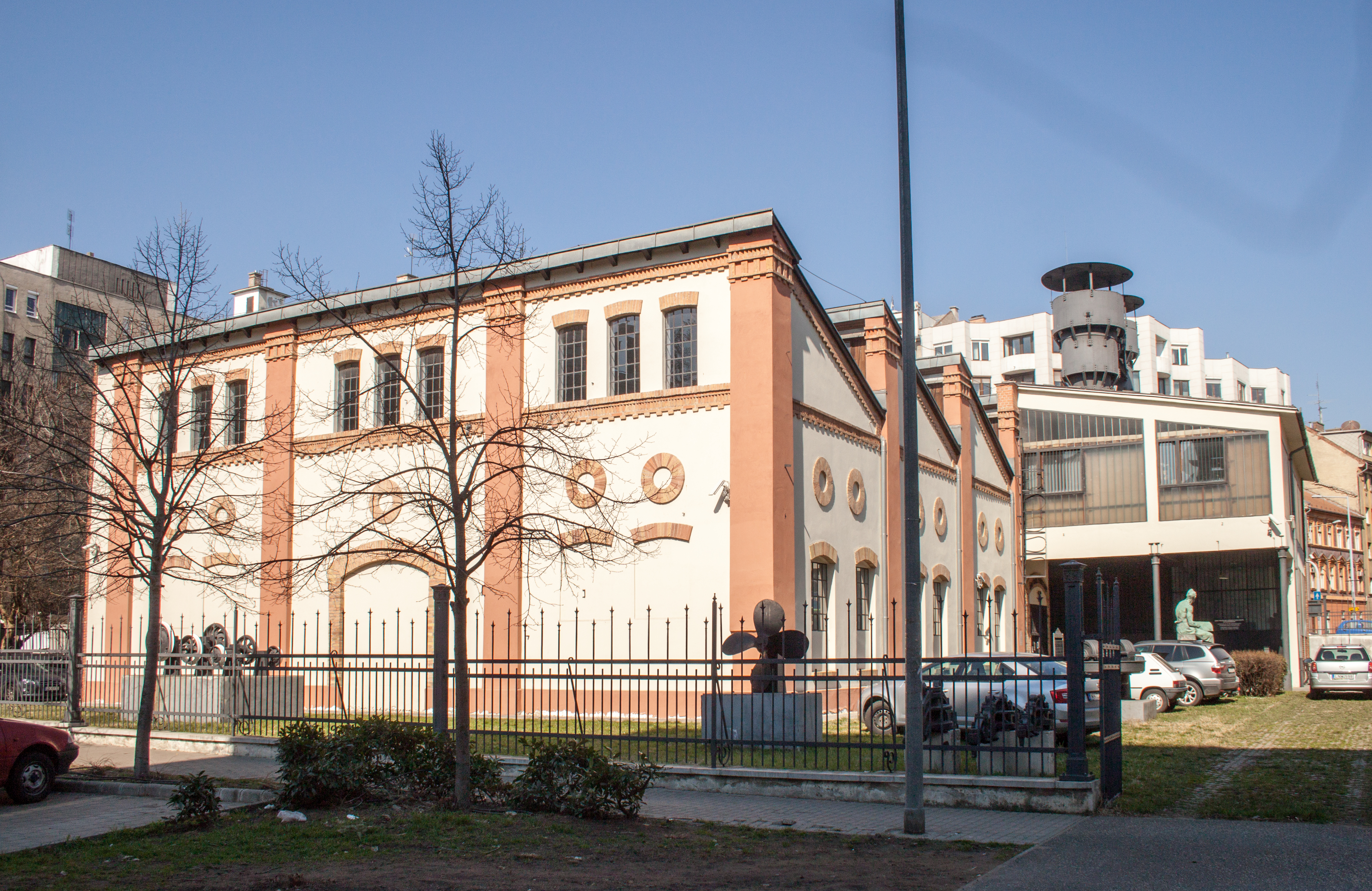
- Coordinates: 47.5114°N 19.0354°E

The Foundry Museum (in Hungarian Öntödei Múzeum) is a museum operating within the framework of the Hungarian Technical and Transportation Museum in Budapest II. district, Bem József utca 20.

== The history of the museum ==
The Foundry Museum - since its foundation in 1969 - has been operating in the former foundry of the Ganz factory (Ganz és Társa Vasöntő és Gépgyár Rt.) founded by Ábrahám Ganz in 1845. Built between 1858 and 1862, the first and for a long time the only bark wheel foundry in Central Europe operated in the hall, but they also produced railway crossing elements and grinding rollers for the grain industry.

Factory production stopped in 1964. After its closure, it was declared an industrial monument at the initiative and under the direction of the technical historian Gyula Kiszely, and after the necessary restoration, it was opened on May 20, 1969. At that time, the institution was maintained by the Lenin Cohászati Művek from Diósgyőr, and in 1994 it became a branch institution of the National Technical Museum and the Hungarian Technical and Transport Museum.

The building was renovated in 1992, based on the plans of Péter Rainer.

== Permanent exhibitions ==
- The bark foundry equipment of the original Ganz factory
- Memories of the life of Ábrahám Ganz
- Domestic memories of metal casting from the Bronze Age to the present day
- The development of iron casting
- Development of steel casting

In the garden of the museum stand the busts of key figures of the Hungarian foundry industry and some larger-scale industrial souvenirs.

== Gallery ==
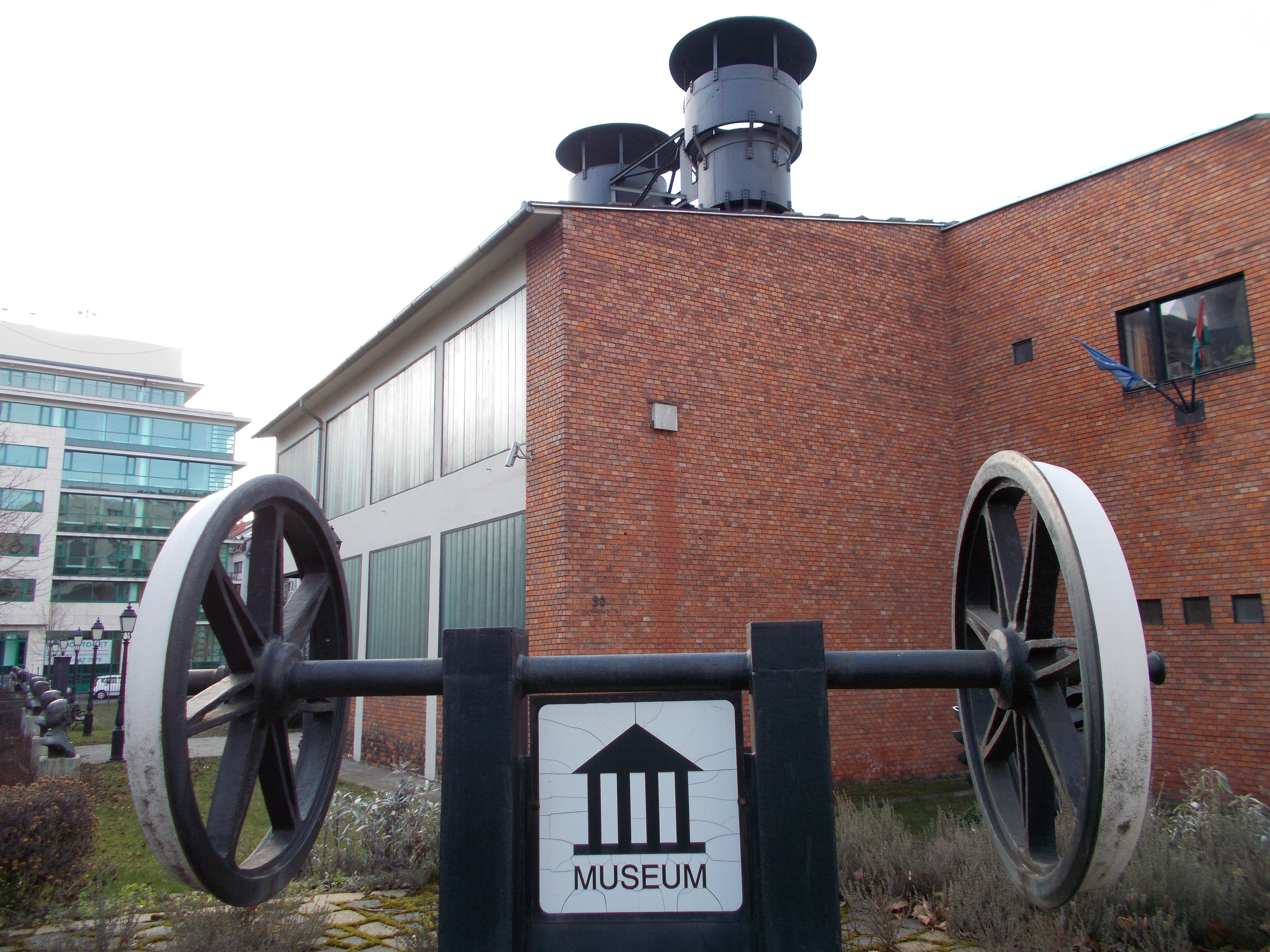

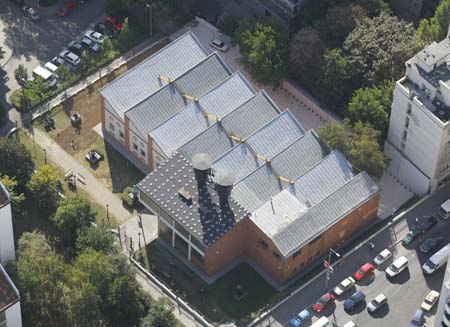

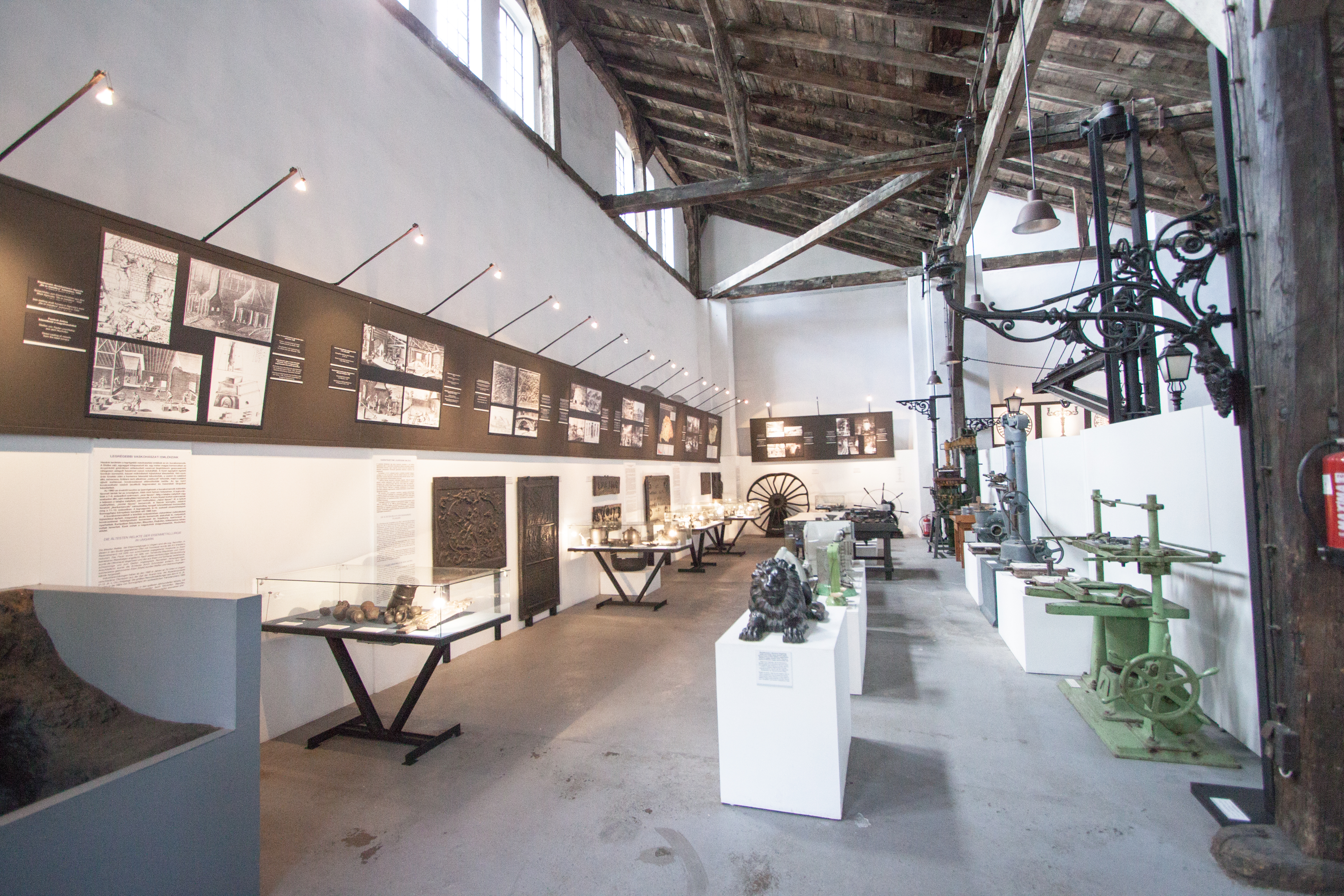

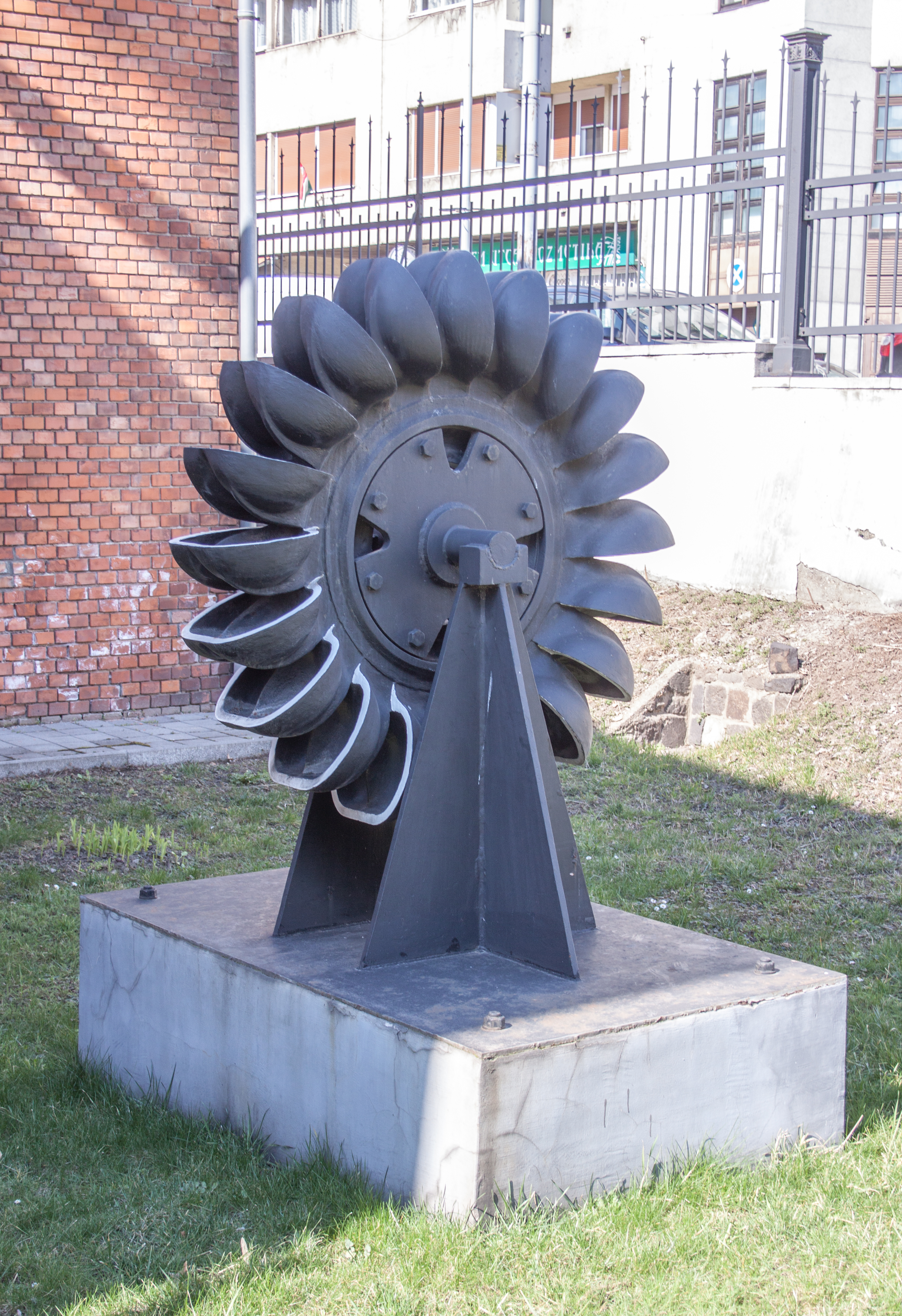

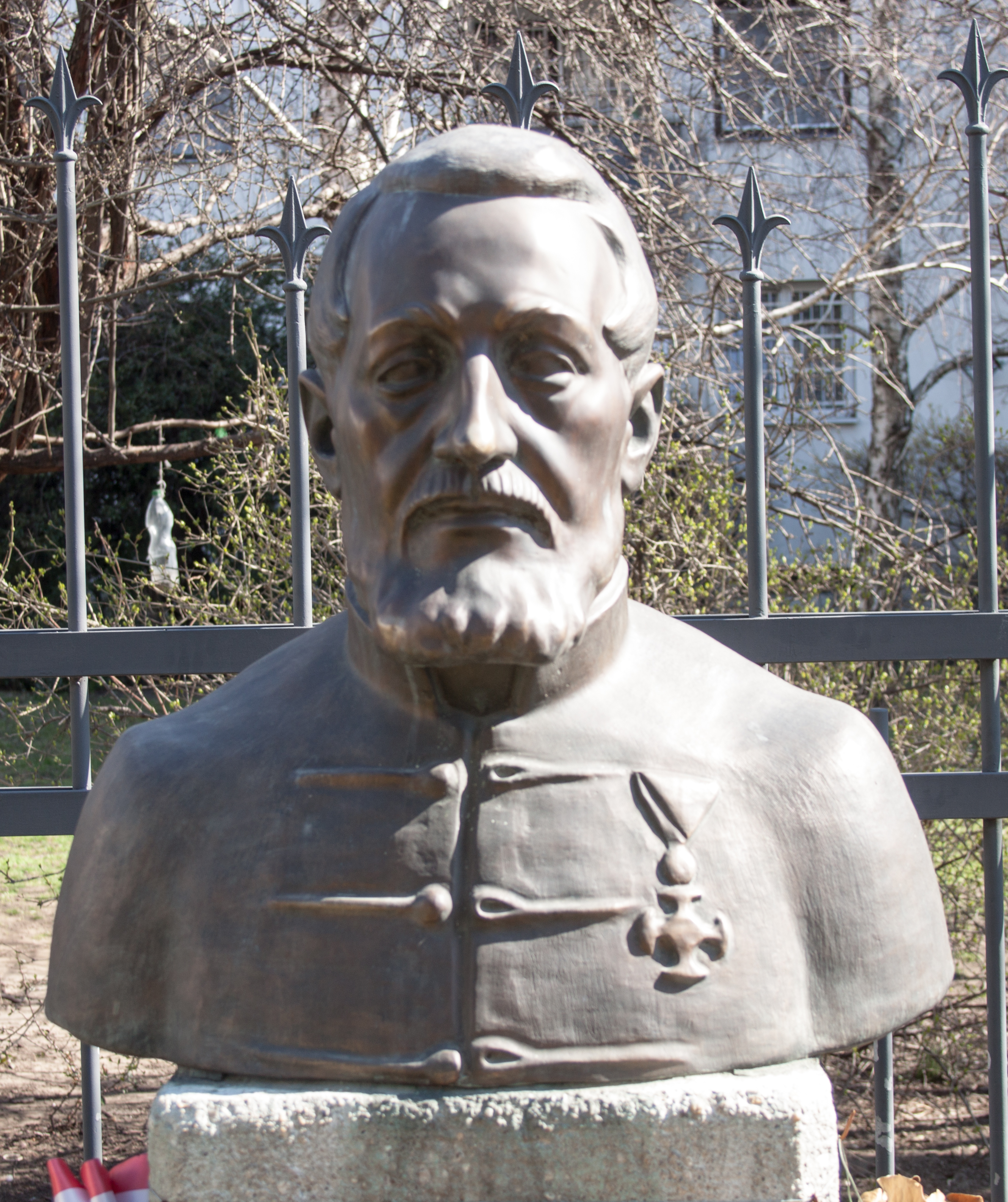
