= Rubik R-22 Futár =

R-22 Futár
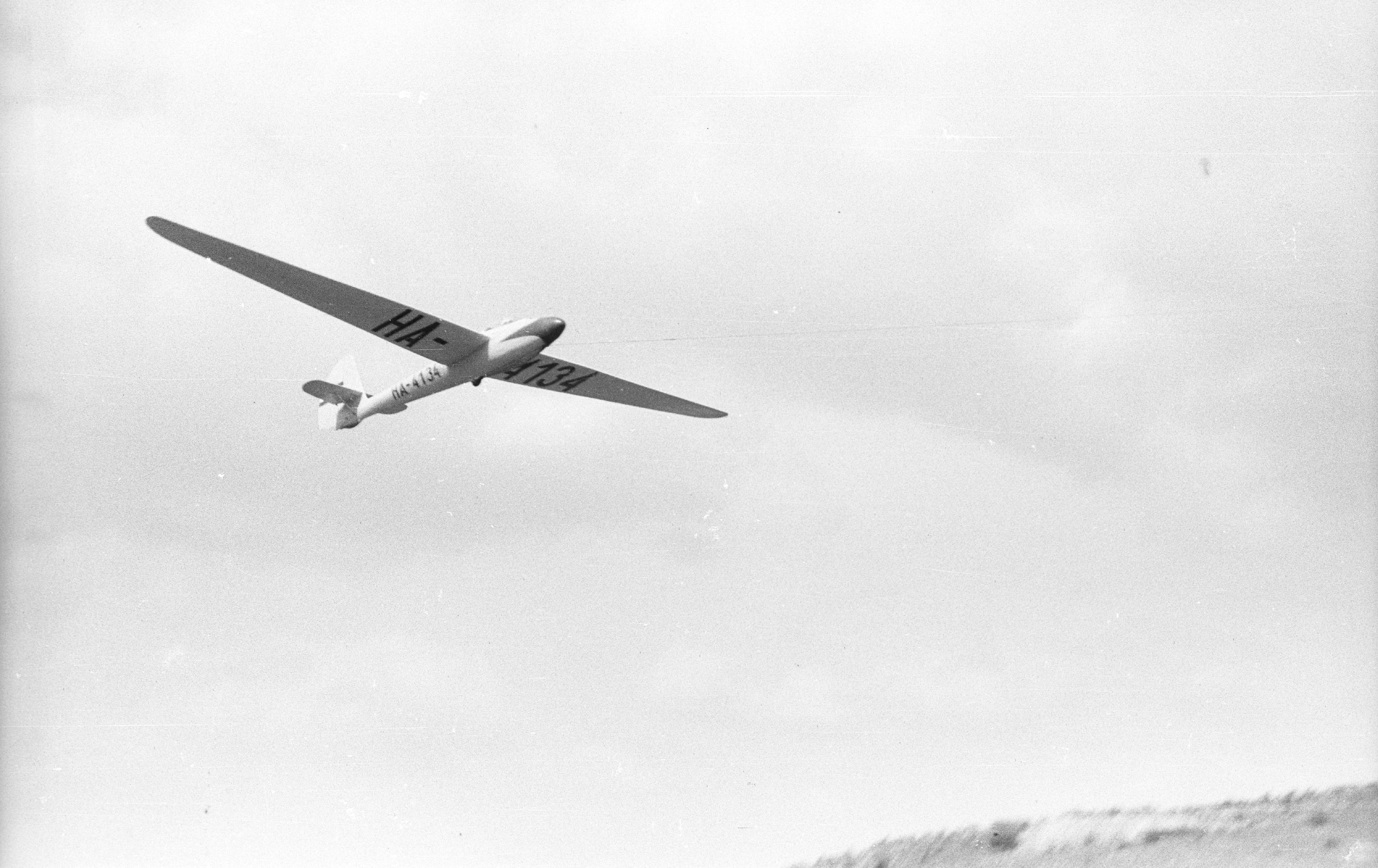
- R-22S Június 18

General information
- Type: High performance sailplane
- National origin: Hungary
- Manufacturer: Aero Ever Ltd., Esztergom
- Designer: Ernő Rubik
- Number built: 104 (all variants).

History
- Introduction date: 1950
- First flight: Winter 1943

The 1943 Hungarian Rubik R-22 Futár (Courier) family of single seat, high performance sailplanes was developed between 1943 and 1958, though production did not begin until 1948. Four variants were serially produced, with the R-22S Június 18 the most numerous. There were several improvements within the types and there were three one-offs. Overall, 104 were built. They set numerous national records and one finished runner-up for distance at the 1958 VIIth World Gliding Championships, coming 11th overall.

== Design and development ==
Chronologically, the R-22 family developed through the family developed from the original R-22 Futár to the R-22S Június-18 and its one-off variants, the "lamináris" and "vizes", then into the three R-22SV Super Futár variants. All had wooden structures, cantilever, shoulder-mounted wings, all but one with spans of about 15.75 m (51 ft 8 in) and Göttingen Gö 549 airfoils. They were single-spar structures, composed of two half-wings pinned together centrally with plywood covering ahead around the leading edge forming a torsion resistant D-box. Aft of the spar, the wings of the R-22 and R-22S were fabric-covered but those of the later R-22SV were ply-covered apart from the ailerons. The ailerons of the early models were long, occupying about 60% of the trailing edge, and broad chord. There were flaps inboard of them, with three intermediate positions between the extreme -7° (up) and +21° deflections, though the last ten R-22Ss had no flaps. Because the wingtips of the R-22SV were not rounded but squared-off, with "almond" fairings, their Frise-type, mass-balanced, divided ailerons were shorter, less than half the span, and were also narrower to compensate for the lost wing area. The R-22 had Gôttingen spoilers mounted on to the rear of the spar but on early production R-22SVs they were replaced with spoilers of Rubik's own design, which had three horizontal close-spaced metal channels in both lower and upper brakes, each fitting within the next for compact retraction. These failed to produce the expected braking and the Gôttingen type was reintroduced in later R-22SVs and used in all later models.

The ovoid-section, wooden fuselage of the original design, the R-22, was a ply covered, semi-monocoque shell formed over frames and stringers. It had a framed canopy with flat plexiglass windows which stretched to mid-chord, smoothly curved into the tapered rear fuselage profile. There was a semi-recessed monowheel under about mid-chord, with a landing skid ahead of it and a tailskid. The integral, ply-covered fin was tall and broad, carrying a large, roughly quadrantal fabric-covered rudder which reached to the keel. Its strutted tailplane was rectangular in plan out to rounded tips and carried tapered elevators, their trailing edges almost ahead of the rudder hinge line.

The main change on the R-22S was a higher, shorter, one-piece, bubble canopy mounted onto a removable ply fairing, extended at the rear to blend into the upper fuselage which was slightly lower, flattening the top of the ovoid. The canopy and rear fuselage were revised again on the 1957 R-22SV. Early production models, the B-Futár, had a one-piece bubble canopy which allowed an unbroken, deepened fuselage profile back to the fin. Other changes were to the rudder, now with an angled straight tailing edge, and to a new, cantilever tailplane. The C-Futár version of the R-22SV, flown the following year, had a two-piece canopy which reached to the nose. The tail surfaces were more angular, with a square tipped vertical tail and trapezoidal horizontal surfaces set further aft than before, so requiring an elevator cut-out for rudder movement. There was also a major undercarriage change with a retractable monowheel. This was fully exposed when lowered but only slightly so when retracted; the nose skid was shortened and reduced in length and depth.

There were three one-off variants. The first, flown in 1953, was the R-22S "lamináris" Június-18, which had a laminar flow wing entirely ply-covered apart from the ailerons, and with a NACA 63_{2}-615 airfoil. In contrast to the Június-18, its leading edge was straight and unswept, with blunter wingtips, shorter ailerons and no flaps. In 1953 the tips were given small "almond" fairing, though these were removed in 1960. Its fuselage and tail was originally unchanged from the Június-18 but in 1960 they were replaced by those of a R-22SV C-Futár. At the same time the span was reduced to 14.92 m (48 ft 11.4 in) to allow it to compete as a 15 m (49 ft 3 in) maximum span Standard Class sailplane.

The R-22S "vizes" (wet) Június-18 was another one-off Június-18 variant, first flown in the spring of 1954. Two 30 L (1.1 cu ft) water tanks were built into the wings, which were entirely ply-covered and with shorter span ailerons. "Almond" tip fairings were added in 1955. The fuselage was unchanged apart from a small, dorsal fin root fairing, a more strongly curved rudder and a cantilever tailplane. In 1957 it got a new, 105° butterfly tail with trapezoidal surfaces and a long tailcone.

The last one-off, the R-22SV Standard Futár or D Futár, was, like the C Futár, first flown in the spring of 1958. It was a Super Futár (C Futár) with span reduced to 14.98 m (49 ft 2 in) to enable it to compete in the Standard Class.

== Operational history ==
The prototype R-22 first flew in the winter of 1943 and gained its airworthiness certificate, permitting cloud flight and basic aerobatics, the following spring. Production was delayed by the war and the prototype was slightly damaged at an airshow in the summer of 1944. Repairs were completed in 1947 and another ten were produced between 1948 and 1950.

The R-22S Junius 18 first flew on 29 June 1950. Production followed rapidly, with seventy examples in total. It set many Hungarian records between 1950 and 1955.

Ten R-22SV Super Futár (B Futár) first flew in March 1957 and ten were built. The same year they also set several new national records. Ten of the C Futárs, the first flown April 1958, were built.

The sole Standard Futár competed at the VIIth World Gliding Championships, held in Lezno in 1958. Nandor Opitz flew it into 11th place overall and flew the second greatest distance (510 km (320 mi; 280 nmi)), gaining the first Hungarian Diamond C badge in the process.

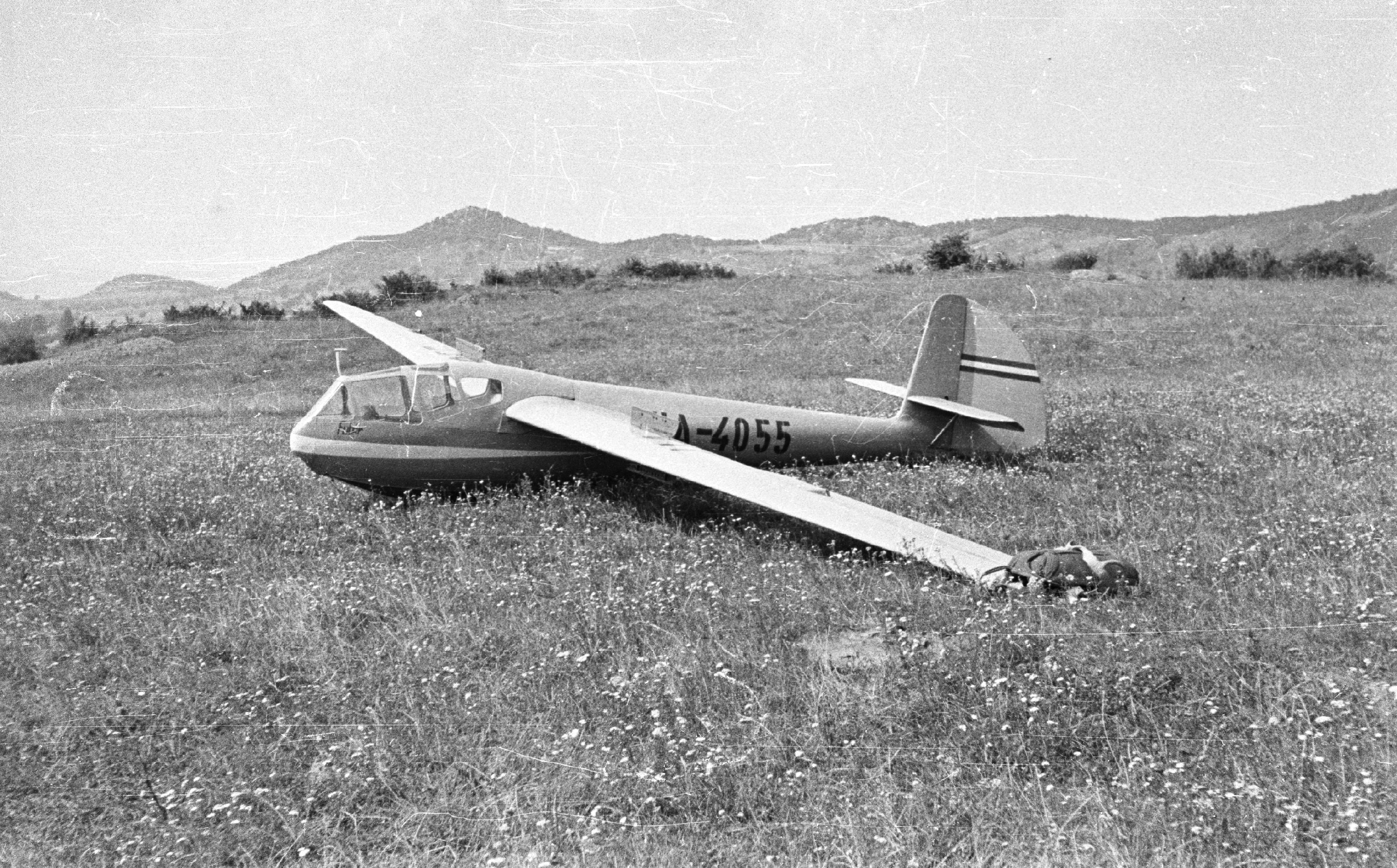
R-22 Futár HA-4055

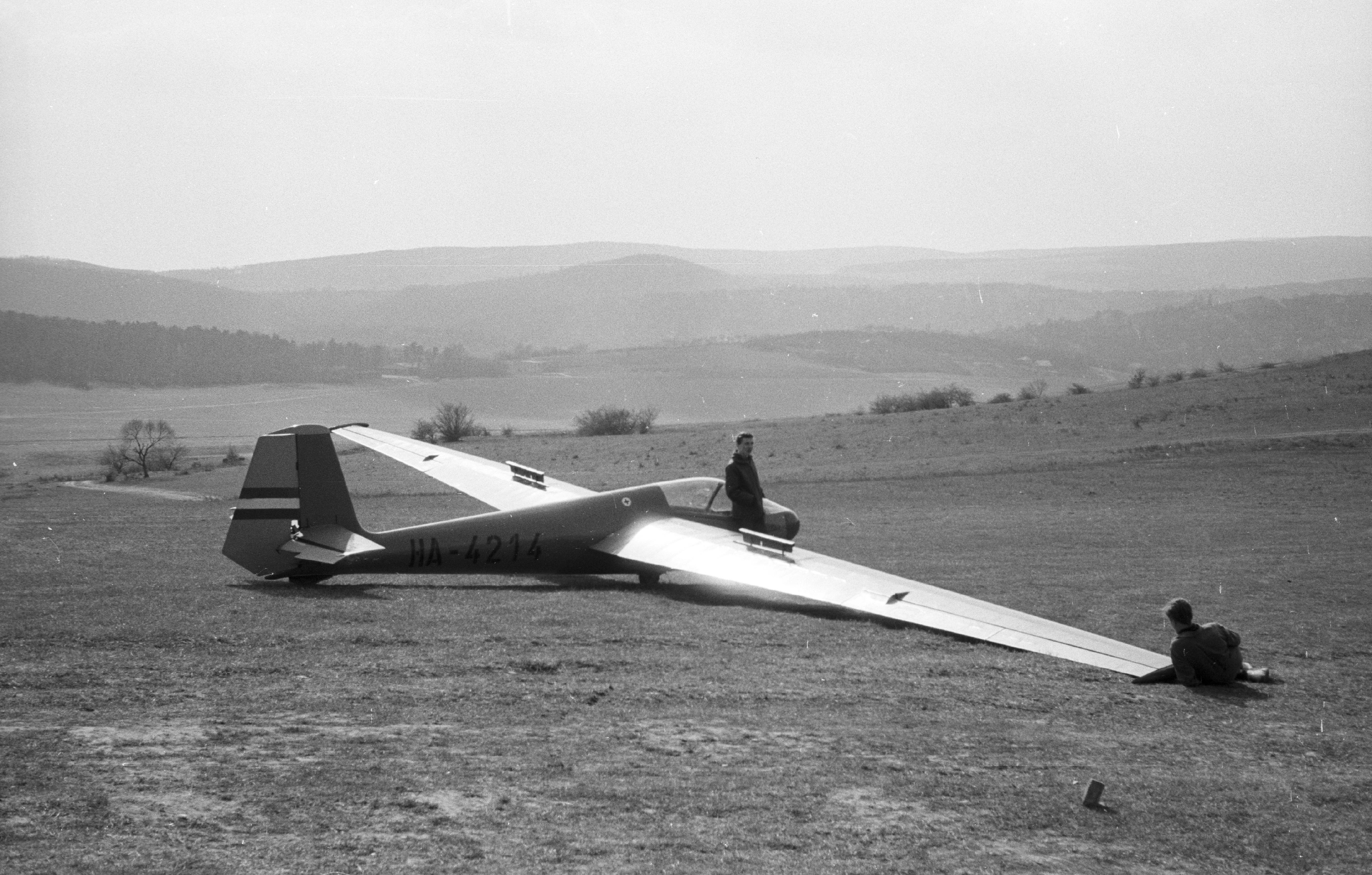
R-22SV Super Futár (C Futár) HA-4214

== Variants ==
R-22 Futár
First flown winter 1943. 10 built production aircraft were built from 1948-50.
R-22S Június-18
First flown 29 June 1950. 70 built.
R-22S "lamináris" Június-18
First flown 1953. One-off R-22S with laminar flow wings.
R-22S "vizes" Június-18
First flown 21 May 1954. One-off with water ballast and later a butterfly tail.
R-22SV Super Futár (B Futár)
First flown March 1957. 10 built.
R-22SV Super Futár (C Futár)
First flown April 1958. 10 built.
R-22SV Standard Futár (D Futár)
First flown May 1958. One-off version of C Futár, with Standard Class 15 m (49 ft 3 in) span.

== Aircraft on display ==
- R-22S Június 18 HA-4085, Magyar Műszaki és Közlekedési Múzeum (Hungarian Technical and Transportation Museum), Budapest.
- R-22S Június 18 HA-4141, Hungarian Technical and Transportation Museum.
- R-22SV Super Futár (B Futár) HA-4028, Hungarian Technical and Transportation Museum.

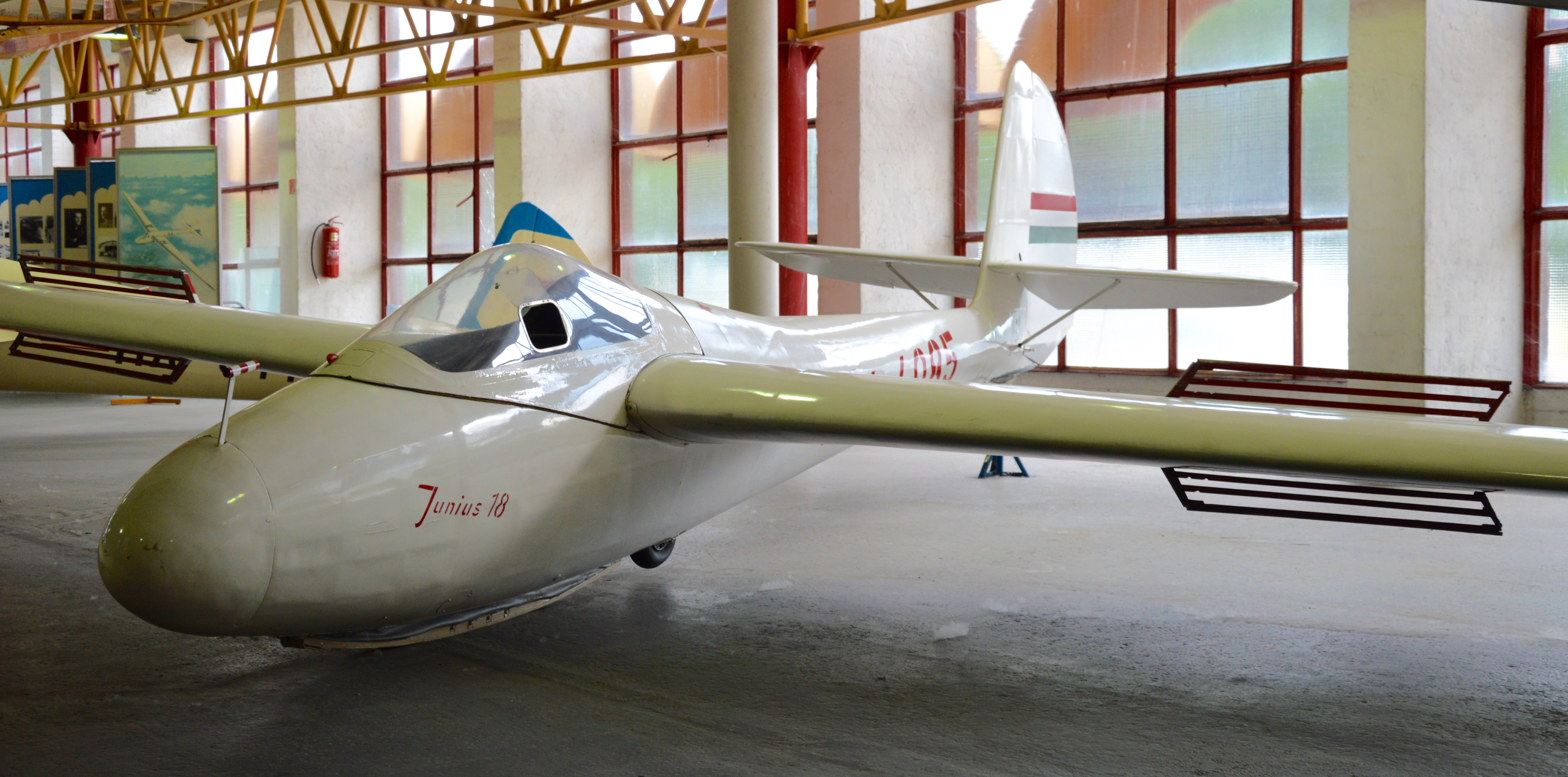
R-22S Június 18 HA-4085, Hungarian Technical and Transportation Museum, Budapest

== Specifications (R-22S Június 18) ==
Data from Gabor, F

General characteristics

- Crew: One
- Length: 6.5 m (21 ft 4 in)
- Wingspan: 15.8 m (51 ft 10 in)
- Wing area: 13.5 m^{2} (145 sq ft)
- Aspect ratio: 18.55
- Empty weight: 180 kg (397 lb)
- Gross weight: 280 kg (617 lb)
- Dihedral: 2°

Performance

- Maximum speed: 220 km/h (140 mph, 120 kn) Never exceed
- Stall speed: 64 km/h (40 mph, 35 kn)
- Maximum glide ratio: 25.7 at 72 km/h (45 mph; 39 kn)
- Rate of sink: 0.74 m/s (146 ft/min) minimum, at 68 km/h (42 mph; 37 kn)
- Maximum airtow speed: 100 km/h (62 mph; 54 kn)
