= Airplane Museum of Szolnok =

Museum in Hungary

Coordinates: 47°7′53″N 20°13′11″E

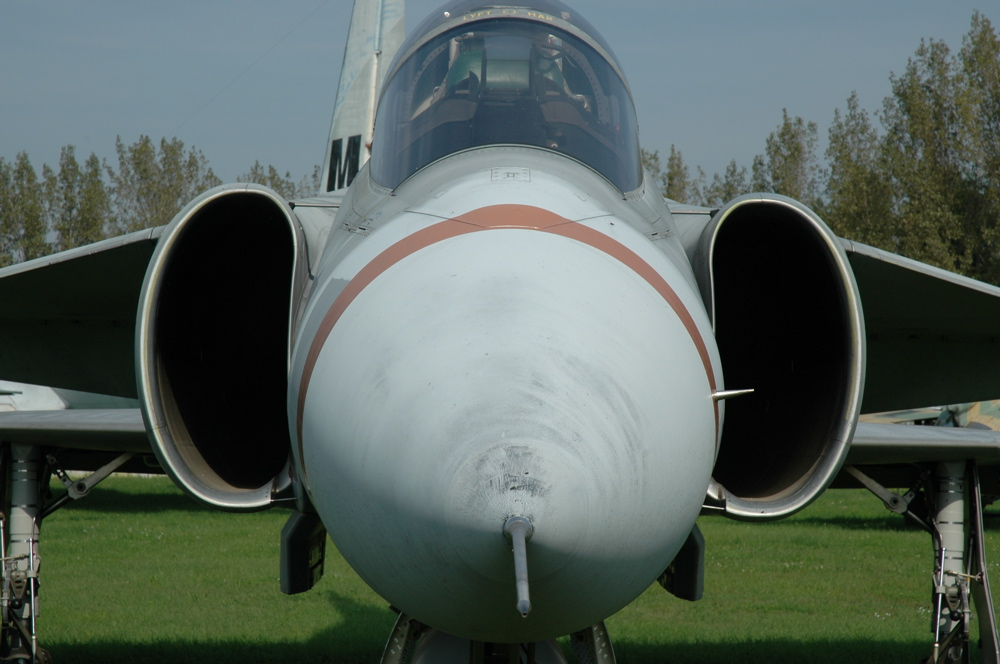
- Saab JA 37 Viggen at the Airplane Museum
- Established: 1973
- Location: Szolnok, Hungary
- Type: Aviation museum
- Website: https://www.reptar.hu/

The Szolnoki Repülőmúzeum ("Airplane Museum of Szolnok") is a large museum displaying old military and civilian aircraft and aircraft engines in Szolnok, Hungary. It was located next to the "Lt. Ittebei Kiss József" Helicopter Base of the Hungarian Air Force; most of the collection has now moved to premises in the city centre, under the new name of Reptár.

== History ==
The museum started out as the aircraft and technical peripherals collection of the "Kilián György Flight Technical College" in 1973. It was established in 1967. Since then many things changed but the collection remained, growing always bigger. Originally the museum focused on military aviation but later civil and utility aircraft were introduced to the collection which is divided into two: the open air part, and a separate indoor area with weaponry, uniforms and photographic collections. The museum also stores the remains of a number of Second World War warplanes shot down over Hungary and it plays a leading role in salvaging and conservation of such wrecks. As result of these efforts the museum recovered an Il-2, two Bf 109s and a LaGG-5. The collection also included a Lisunov Li-2 which was since restored to airworthy condition, thus becoming the only airworthy exemplar of the kind.

== Collection ==
=== Fixed-wing motorized aircraft ===
- K-001 Denevér (eng. mean.:"bat", the first, and only complete fully Hungarian-made UAV)
- Super Aero 45
- Aero L-29 Delfin
- Aero L-39 Albatros ZO
- Antonov An-2
- Antonov An-24

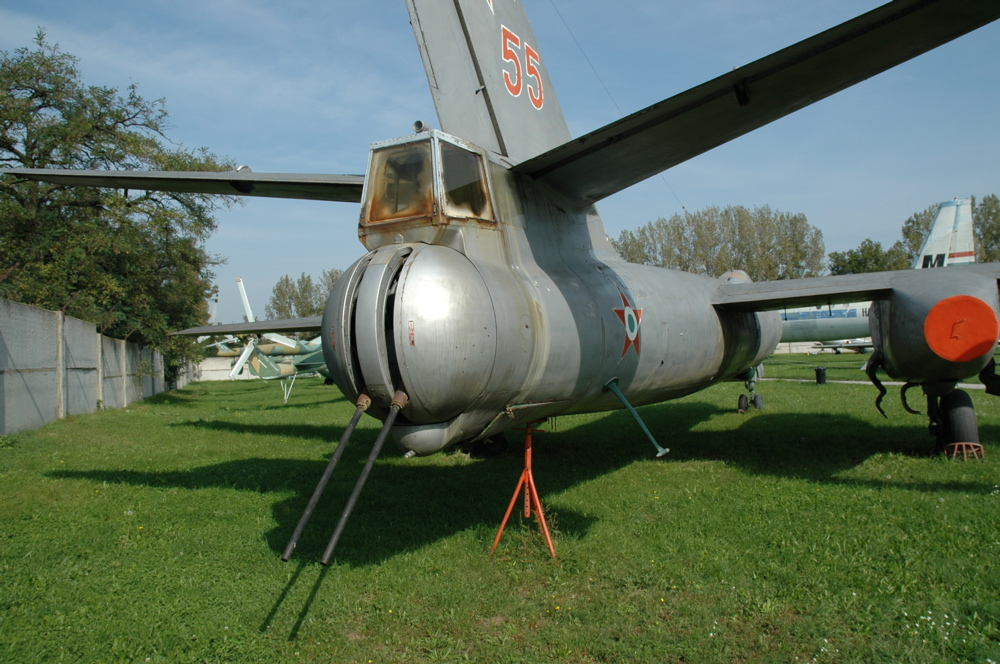
Ilyushin Il-28 light bomber

- Antonov An-26
- F-104 Starfighter (ex Turkish)
- F-104 Starfighter (ex West German)
- Hawker Hunter Mk58, ex Patrouille Suisse
- Ilyushin Il-2 M3 (wreck from the Lake Balaton)
- Ilyushin Il-14
- Ilyushin Il-18 V
- Ilyushin Il-28
- Let L-200A Morava
- Lisunov Li-2
- Mikoyan-Gurevich MiG-15 bis
- Mikoyan-Gurevich MiG-15 UTI
- Mikoyan-Gurevich MiG-17 PF
- Mikoyan-Gurevich MiG-19 PM
- Mikoyan-Gurevich MiG-21 F-13
- Mikoyan-Gurevich MiG-21 MF
- Mikoyan-Gurevich MiG-21 bis
- Mikoyan-Gurevich MiG-21 bisAP
- Mikoyan-Gurevich MiG-21 PF

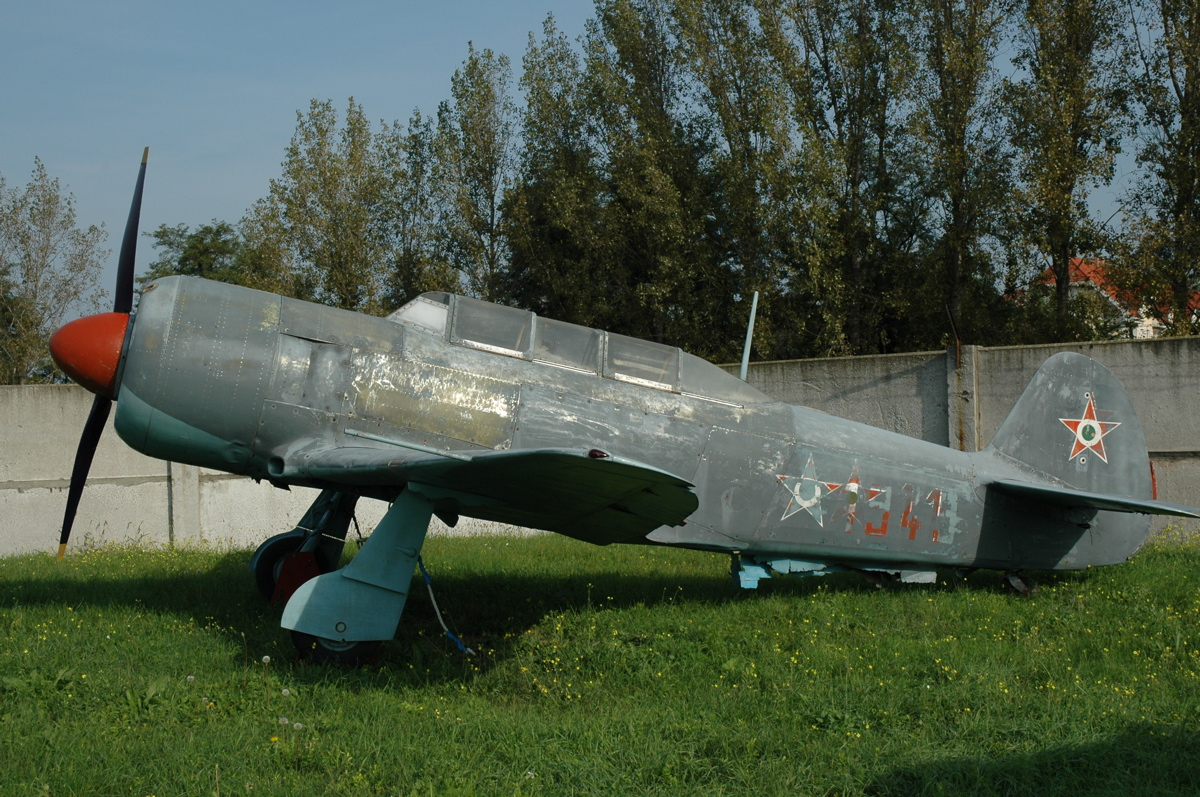
Yakovlev Yak-11 (LET C-11) trainer aircraft, sold in 2006

- Mikoyan-Gurevich MiG-21 R
- Mikoyan-Gurevich MiG-21 U
- Mikoyan-Gurevich MiG-21 UM
- Mikoyan-Gurevich MiG-23 MF
- Mikoyan-Gurevich MiG-23 UB
- Messerschmitt Bf 108 Taifun got for the sold Yakovlev Yak-11 restored (now in the new hangar)
- Polikarpov Po-2 (now in the new hangar)
- Saab J 32E Lansen
- Saab JA 37DI Viggen
- Sukhoi Su-22 M3
- Tupolev Tu-134
- Tupolev Tu-154
- Yakovlev Yak-11 (Got from the Keceli haditechnikai park, now in the new hangar, and currently the only one in Hungary)
- Yakovlev Yak-12 R (now in the new hangar)
- Yakovlev Yak-18 (now in the new hangar)
- Yakovlev Yak-52

=== Gliders ===
- R-16 Lepke
- R-26S Góbé

=== Helicopters ===
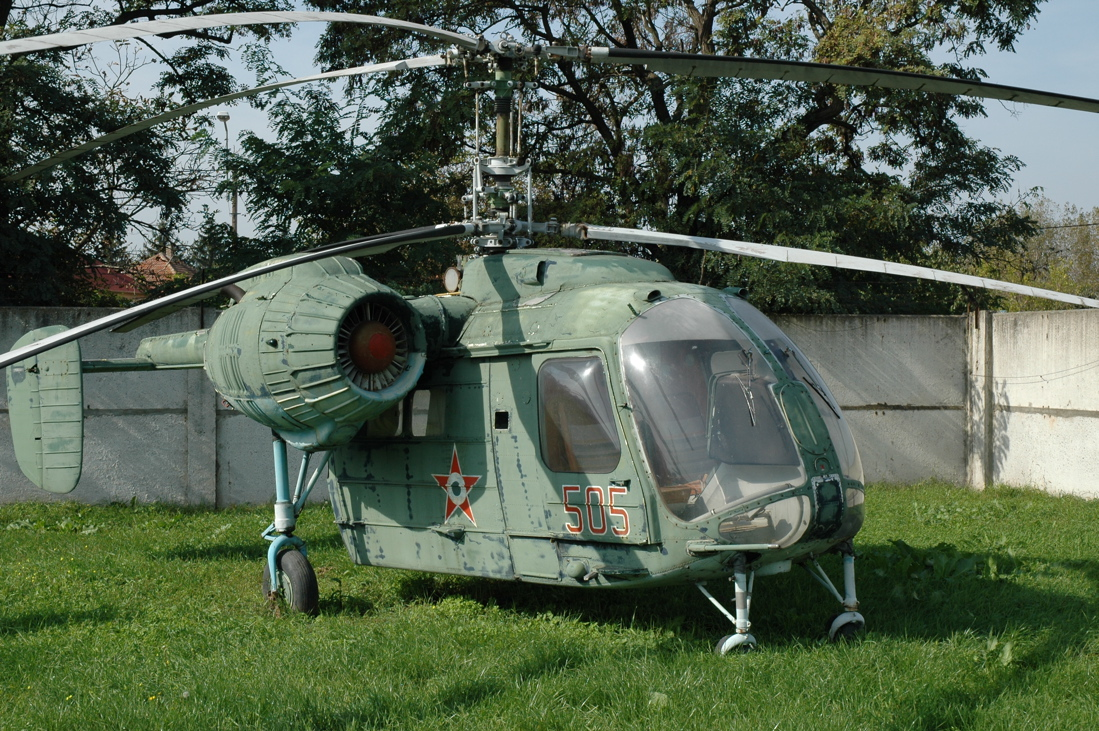
Kamov Ka-26 helicopter

- Mil Mi-1 M
- Mil Mi-2
- Mil Mi-4 A
- Mil Mi-8 P
- Mil Mi-8 T
- Mil Mi-24 D
- Kamov Ka-26

=== Engines ===
- Avia M-462 RF
- BMW 801
- Daimler-Benz DB 605
- Fejes Jenő's experimental engine
- Isotov GTD-350
- Isotov TV2-117A
- Ivchenko AI-14R
- Ivchenko AI-26V
- Ivchenko AI-20M

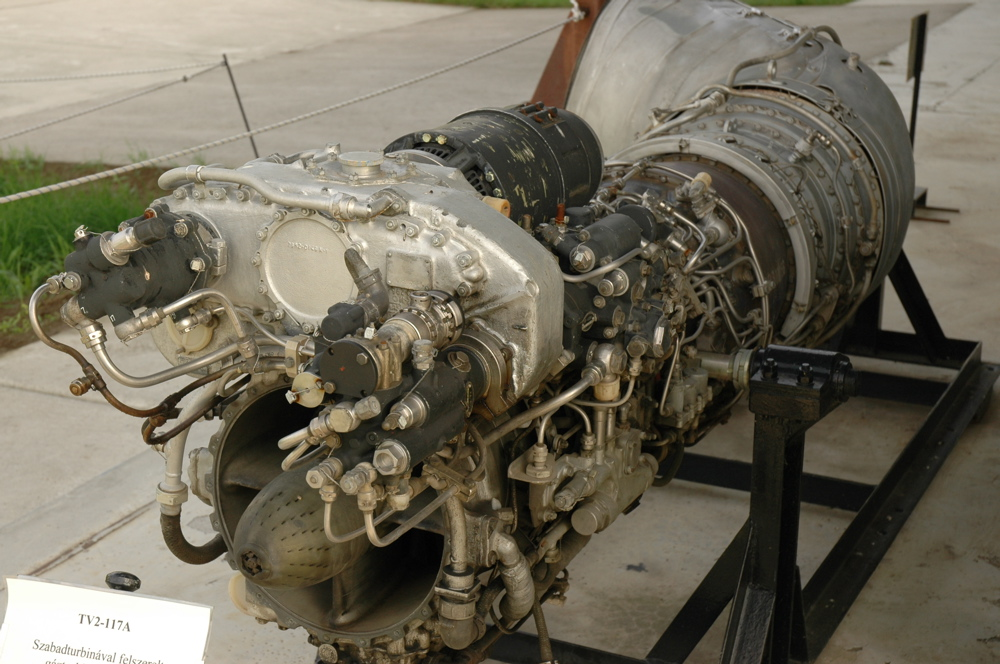
Isotov TV2-117A turboshaft engine

- Ivchenko AI-24VT
- Ivchenko AI-25TL
- Klimov VK-1A
- Kuznetsov NK-8-2U
- Le Rhône 9J
- Mikulin AM-42
- Siemens-Halske Sh 4
- Shvetsov M-11FR
- Shvetsov AS-21
- Shvetsov AS-62 IR
- Shvetsov AS-82
- Tumansky RD-9B
- Tumansky R-11F-300
- Vedeneev M-14V-26
- Walter 6-III

== Miscellaneous ==
- A unique Fiat G.12 fuselage section
- Ejection seats
- Various onboard weapon systems
- Aerial photo reconnaissance cameras
- Radar systems

== See also ==
- List of aerospace museums
