= Győr-2 =

General information
- Type: Sailplane
- National origin: Hungary
- Manufacturer: Aircraft Designer and Builder Group, Aeroclub of the Rolling-stock Factory, Győr
- Number built: 1

History
- First flight: 18 July 1951

The Győr-2 was a high performance sailplane designed and built at the Aircraft Designer and Builder Group, Aeroclub of the Rolling-stock Factory, Győr in Hungary in the early 1950s.

== Development ==
After the international gliding competition held at Zar, Poland in 1949 the leadership of the Aeroclub asked its members to design and build a glider capable of Gold badge distance flights and attempt international record breaking flights.

Dr. Károly Szomolányi organised a team led by Árpád Lampich, composed of János Balogh, Jenõ Kapuvári, Béla Pusztay and Gusztáv Sónyi, supported by the factory, particularly for production of drawings.

== Design ==
The resulting aircraft, (the first all-metal glider designed and built in Hungary), was predominantly built from steel and light alloys due to the lack of high-quality timber in Hungary, emerging as a shoulder winged cantilever monoplane with a retractable mainwheel. Other factors in the choice of materials were the experience gained during the war in producing aircraft for the Axis war machine, the intention to build a production series and the availability of war surplus light alloy stock. The paucity of high quality steel tubing necessitated manufacturing the fuselage structure steel tubing from a recovered Bell P-39 Airacobra landing gear strut. The design performance envelope allowed for cloud flying and spinning but not aerobatics.

=== Structure ===
Wing
The shoulder-mounted, all-metal cantilever wing used NACA five figure sections throughout and mounted slotted flaperons, in four section along the full span of the tapered wings trailing edge. With no geometric washout applied, differential deflection of the ailerons was used to increase spin resistance. The original rounded wing-tips were modified in 1957 with end-plates which served as barriers to vortex inducing flow between upper and lower surfaces as well as skids to reduce the likelihood of damage to the tips.

The structure of the wing was built up from angle bar and sheet Duralumin with the structure forward of the spars skinned in Duralumin to form torsion boxes, but aft of the main spars the wings were fabric covered.

Originally built with slantwise cut, rounded wingtips, in 1957 streamlined end-plates were fitted which also served as wing-tip skids.

Fuselage
The pod-like forward fuselage was of elliptical section which rapidly reduced to a tail boom aft of the wings. The structure of the forward fuselage was of steel tube covered with Elektron, (a Magnesium alloy), and the tail boom was built up from Duralumin sheet also covered with Elektron. Both wings and tail boom were attached to the centre-section by easily removed pins to allow for de-rigging the glider.

The single seat cockpit was fully enclosed with Plexiglas and was fitted with an adjustable seat to accommodate pilots of different stature. Visibility through the canopy was very good and it could be jettisoned to enable the pilot to bail-out in an emergency, later in 1954, the canopy was modified to be flush with the fuselage.

Mounted forward of the centre of gravity (c.g.) the mainwheel was manually retractable, as was the nose skid, with the tail supported by the re-inforced base of the tail unit.

Tail unit
Of conventional layout, the relatively small tail unit was sufficient to provide stability and control due to the large moment from the long fuselage boom. Constructed from electron sheeting and covered with fabric, the tail unit could be folded up with the tailplanes and elevators folding up to the fin for transport / de-rigging.

Controls
Conventional control stick and rudder pedals operated the controls via pushrods. Roll and camber control were achieved through four full span differentially operated Duralumin skinned flaperons on the trailing edges of the mainplanes. Approach control was achieved through Göppingen type airbrakes on upper and lower wing surfaces. Wing loading could also be adjusted on the ground by attaching ballast to the wing roots.

== Operational history ==
First flown on 18 July 1951, flight testing revealed that the measured performance was extremely good, placing the Győr-2 among the top contemporary high performance sailplanes, with a peak L/D ratio of 40.6 and a nominal best L/D of 36.8. The handling characteristics were good at all speed ranges, however when rolling on the ground the ailerons' effectiveness was not satisfactory. Flight testing proceeded slowly and by 1952 the aircraft required maintenance, during which the design team introduced modified control systems, increased span ailerons and mainwheel moved behind the c.g.

On resumption of flight test, performance was compared with Rubik R-22S Június-18 (the best contemporary Hungarian performance glider), revealing that the glide ratio of the Győr-2 surpassed that of the R-22S by 32% at 80 km/h (43 kn) and by 63% at 110 km/h (59 kn).

Certification of the Győr-2 was delayed as Hungarian aviation authorities believed that the materials used might be corroded. After the Aircraft Department of the Technical University of Budapest had approved the glider's documentation, and the structure of the glider had been examined by a committee, the Győr-2 was issued with an airworthiness certificate.

Further modifications in 1954 included a new, more streamlined canopy, but the aircraft remained seldom flown with few of the intended record attempt flights, until Nándor Opitz flew a 100 km (62 mi) triangle for a national speed record of 69.44 km/h (37.49 kn) in 1957.

Another overhaul in 1957 introduced streamlined end-plates on the wing-tips and more improvements, but the glider and production tooling, had been moved to the Central Workshop of the MRSz by 1958, where it was stored and finally disposed of.

== Specifications (Győr-2) ==
Data from Hungarian Gliders 1933-2000, The World's Sailplanes:Die Segelflugzeuge der Welt:Les Planeurs du Monde

General characteristics

- Crew: 1
- Length: 6.81 m (22 ft 4 in)
- Wingspan: 17 m (55 ft 9 in)
- Height: 0.95 m (3 ft 1 in)
- Wing area: 13 m^{2} (140 sq ft)
- Aspect ratio: 22.3
- Airfoil:
  - (root):NACA 23018
  - (mid-span): NACA 23012
  - (tip) NACA 23009
- Empty weight: 215 kg (474 lb)
- Max takeoff weight: 437 kg (963 lb)

Performance

- Stall speed: 75 km/h (47 mph, 40 kn)
- Never exceed speed: 260 km/h (160 mph, 140 kn)
- Max. speed in rough air: 140 km/h (76 kn)
- Max. aerotow speed: 140 km/h (76 kn)
- Max. winch speed: 110 km/h (59 kn)
- g limits: +4 -2 at 130 km/h (70 kn)
- Maximum glide ratio: 36.8 at 92 km/h (50 kn)
- Rate of sink: 0.68 m/s (134 ft/min) at 85 km/h (46 kn)
- Wing loading: 33.8 kg/m^{2} (6.9 lb/sq ft)
