= Lampich LS-16 =

Lampisch LS-16

General information
- Type: Training glider
- National origin: Hungary
- Designer: Árpád Lampich
- Number built: 1

History
- First flight: 1939

The Lampisch LS-16 was a Hungarian training glider of mixed construction. It was flown but not granted a Certificate of Airworthiness.

== Design and development ==
In 1939 Árpád Lampich designed a single-seat club trainer constructed from wood, steel sheet and steel tubes. Its wing, which was mounted on top of the fuselage, was rectangular in plan out to angled, blunted tips and built around a wooden I-beam spar at about 25% of the chord, assisted by an auxiliary spar near the trailing edge. The latter was a steel cylinder for about half the span, extended outboard with steel pates on which the constant-chord ailerons were mounted. The ribs were wooden ahead of the main spar but light alloy plate behind. The wing was internally braced with diagonal steel tubes and fabric-covered. Externally, it was braced on each side with a steel tube strut from the lower fuselage longeron to the main spar at about 40% span.

The fuselage was a steel tube structure which from the wing rearwards had four longerons forming a parallelogram section, deeper than wide. There was additional cross-bracing under the wing and a low, shelf-like forward projection to carry the wooden-framed open cockpit, placed just ahead of the wing leading edge, and the nose. A rubber-spring landing skid ran from the nose to just aft of the wing strut attachment point. Aft, the fuselage tapered to a conventional tail with a blunted rectangular horizontal tail on its top. Its fin was small and hinged a flat-topped, quadrilateral rudder that reached down to the keel and worked in a cut-out between the elevators. The fabric-covered tail was constructed from steel tubes and light alloy plates. Below it there was a faired, sprung tail skid.

The LS-16 first flew in 1939 but it failed to receive a Certificate of Airworthiness, its structure being judged too weak and too flexible.

== Specifications ==
Data from Gabor, F

General characteristics

- Crew: One
- Length: 5.88 m (19 ft 3 in)
- Wingspan: 12 m (39 ft 4 in)
- Wing area: 14.8 m^{2} (159 sq ft)
- Aspect ratio: 9.74
- Airfoil: NACA 23 012
- Empty weight: 84 kg (185 lb)
- Gross weight: 74 kg (163 lb)

Performance

- Stall speed: 44 km/h (27 mph, 24 kn)
- Maximum glide ratio: 16 best
- Rate of sink: 0.92 m/s (181 ft/min) minimum
