= Svachulay Szent György =

Szent György

General information
- Type: Secondary training glider
- National origin: Hungary
- Manufacturer: Workshop of Svachulay
- Designer: Sándor Svachulay
- Number built: 2

History
- First flight: Spring 1933

The Svachulay Szent György (St. George) was a small, single-seat glider built in Hungary in the early 1930s. Two slightly different examples were completed and flown successfully, but persistent concerns about structural strength eventually saw them grounded.

== Development ==
Sándor Svachulay's aim in designing the Szent György, nicknamed Gyuri (Georgie), was to produce the smallest single seat glider. An all wood aircraft with a complex gull wing, the György was built in his own workshop. The first flights were made in the spring of 1933. A second, modified example was built soon after, following concerns about the strength of the György I's wing bracing. The bracing was altered, the span reduced, the empennage modified and the cockpit brought forward. Named Szent György II, this aircraft first flew on 3 September 1933.

The two gliders flew for another 18 months, their best recorded flight lasting 52 minutes. After that the concerns about structural strength surfaced again and the two gliders were officially grounded. The György I was abandoned but Svachulay passed the second aircraft to two of his students at the Technical University who strengthened it and flew it again. In September 1935 it crashed and was destroyed.

== Design ==
The Szent György was an all wood aircraft, its wing built around four spars and shoulder mounted. Each half-wing had two panels, the inner one with a rectangular plan and 10° of dihedral and an outer panel with a trapezoidal plan, 20° of sweep and 2.2° of anhedral. The outer panels also thinned outwards from the 9.5% thickness-to-chord ratio of the inner panels. Ahead of the forward spar the wing was plywood-covered, with the rest fabric covered. Each half-wing was wire braced with a pair of lift wires from the fuselage underside to the inner-outer wing panel junction. On the György I a single landing wire reached over the cockpit between these junctions. This arrangement led to concerns about safety, so on the György II there was a central steel cabane strut from which landing wires ran out and rearwards to the rear of the junctions. Short, broad ailerons reached to the tips. Because their hinges were unswept, the sweep of the trailing edges produced triangular plan surfaces, broadest at the tips.

In addition to the revised bracing, the wingspan of the György II was reduced from the 10.5 m (34 ft 5 in) of the György I to 9.6 m (31 ft 6 in) by the removal of two ribs from each of the outer panels.

The György I's ply covered fuselage, built around circular frames, was deepest under the wing and tapered rearwards. In the György I, the pilot had an open cockpit at mid-chord but this was moved forward of the leading edge on the György II. A rubber-sprung landing skid ran from the nose to under the wing at mid-chord. Though the empennage changes made between the György I and II are not well documented, they had similar vertical surfaces, with a small, triangular fin and a full, rounded rudder. The tailplane of both models was mounted on top of the fuselage but differed in plan. The György I's was triangular but on the György II the leading edge was straight. Both carried strongly swept elevators, though shortened on the Gyuri II.

== Variants ==
Szent György I
First flown spring 1933.
Szent György II
First flown 3 September 1933. Span reduced to 9.6 m (31 ft 6 in) and wing bracing altered. The horizontal tail was redesigned and the cockpit moved forward.

== Specifications (Szent György I) ==
General characteristics

- Crew: One
- Wingspan: 10.5 m (34 ft 5 in)
- Wing area: 11 m^{2} (120 sq ft)
- Aspect ratio: 10
- Empty weight: 60 kg (132 lb)
- Gross weight: 135 kg (298 lb) approximately
