= Kesselyák KM 400 =

KM 400
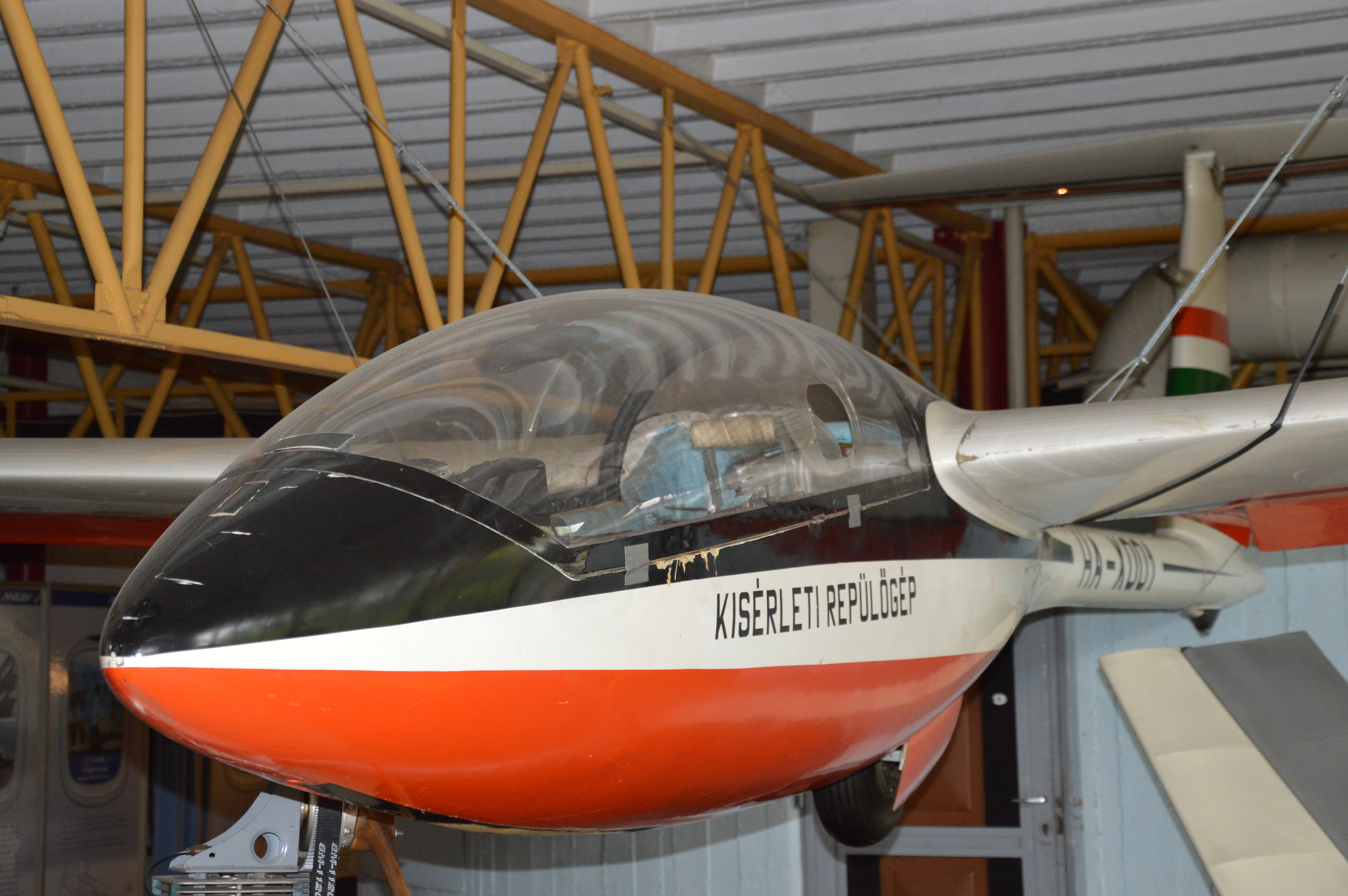

General information
- Type: Single seat competition sailplane
- National origin: Hungary
- Manufacturer: MÉM Air Service
- Designer: Mihály Kesselyák
- Number built: 1

History
- First flight: June 1983

The Kesselyák KM 400 is a competition sailplane designed and built in Hungary in the 1980s. It is unusual in having no movable elevator; instead, pitch is controlled by wing mounted flaperons. Only one was completed.

== Design and development ==
The spur for the KM 400 was an Australian Gliding magazine competition, though Kesselyák's design was judged too difficult for the amateur builders the organizers had in mind. Nonetheless, by 1975 he had found financial backing and by 1983 the KM 400 had been built by the MÉM Air Service at Nyíregyháza.

The KM 400 is of mixed construction, with glass-plastic moulding over an alloy frame in the nose and over a steel tube frame in the centre section. Elsewhere, the KM 400 is all metal, a mixture of steel and alloy with an outer layer of glass cloth on the wings to ensure a smooth finish. The shoulder mounted wings were straight tapered in plan with sweep on both edges. They were built around a single, broad chord spar of unusual construction; both upper and lower flanges consist of layers of 0.4 mm (0.016 in) light alloy sheets, eleven of them at the root, bonded together. Each layer has a different length so the flanges become thinner outboard. At the tip there are only two layers in each flange. The fuselage is a pod and boom design, with a long, low, sideways hinged canopy over the cockpit and the reclining pilot's seat, with a fixed transparent extension aft to the trailing edge. The tailboom, bolted to the tubular steel central frame, is a 200 mm (7.87 in) diameter steel tube. This carries a broad fin with a straight, swept leading edge and an upright rudder The KM 400 has a T-tail, with a long span fixed tailplane of aspect ratio 10. There is a retractable monowheel in the rear of the pod at the centre of gravity under the wing and a tail bumper.

The most unusual feature of the KN 400 is that it has no elevators. Instead, longitudinal (pitch) control is by camber changing flaperons. These occupy the whole of the trailing edge of each wing, divided into seven segments. When the control column is pulled back these flaps extend and increase the camber of the whole wing, which in turn raises the nose. Conventional flaps also change wing camber, though only over the inboard part of the wing and requiring separate control. The pitched up attitude was stabilized by careful design of the tailplane to produce the necessary downforce from the greater downwash of the more cambered wing. Kesselyák argued that this approach lowered both the induced drag produced by a tailplane used to control attitude and the parasitic drag from the fuselage, no longer out of the flight direction.

Lateral (roll) control is achieved through conventional differential flap operation. Each wing has a pair of Schempp-Hirth type spoilers on its upper surface only, placed just aft of the spar and occupying 27% of the span.

The KM 400 first flew in June 1983 at Nyíregyháza, piloted by Károly Borosnyai. An all-moving tailplane was fitted on these early flights, to check out its general characteristics. It was then modified so the pilot could switch between locked and unlocked elevator and by December 1983 was reported as flying successfully entirely under flaperon control. Tests to optimize the tailplane were still in progress in 1988, after which little is heard about the KM 400.

== Aircraft on display ==
The sole KM 400 is now on display in the Közlekedési Muzeum, Budapest.

== Specifications ==
Data from Sailplanes1965-2000

General characteristics

- Capacity: 1
- Length: 6.75 m (22 ft 2 in)
- Wingspan: 15.00 m (49 ft 3 in)
- Wing area: 11.62 m^{2} (125.1 sq ft)
- Aspect ratio: 19.35
- Airfoil: Wortmann FX 67-K-170 over most of the span, changing to FX 67-K-150 at tip
- Empty weight: 260 kg (573 lb)
- Gross weight: 370 kg (816 lb) ; maximum 470 kg (1,036 lb)

Performance

- Maximum speed: 330 km/h (210 mph, 180 kn)
- Maximum glide ratio: Best 41.6, at 103 km/h (64 mph; 56 kn)
- Rate of sink: 0.68 m/s (134 ft/min) minimum, at 79 km/h (49 mph; 43 kn)
- Wing loading: 31.8 kg/m^{2} (6.5 lb/sq ft) at 370 kg (816 lb)
