= Kemény K-02 =

Hungarian training glider from the late 1940s

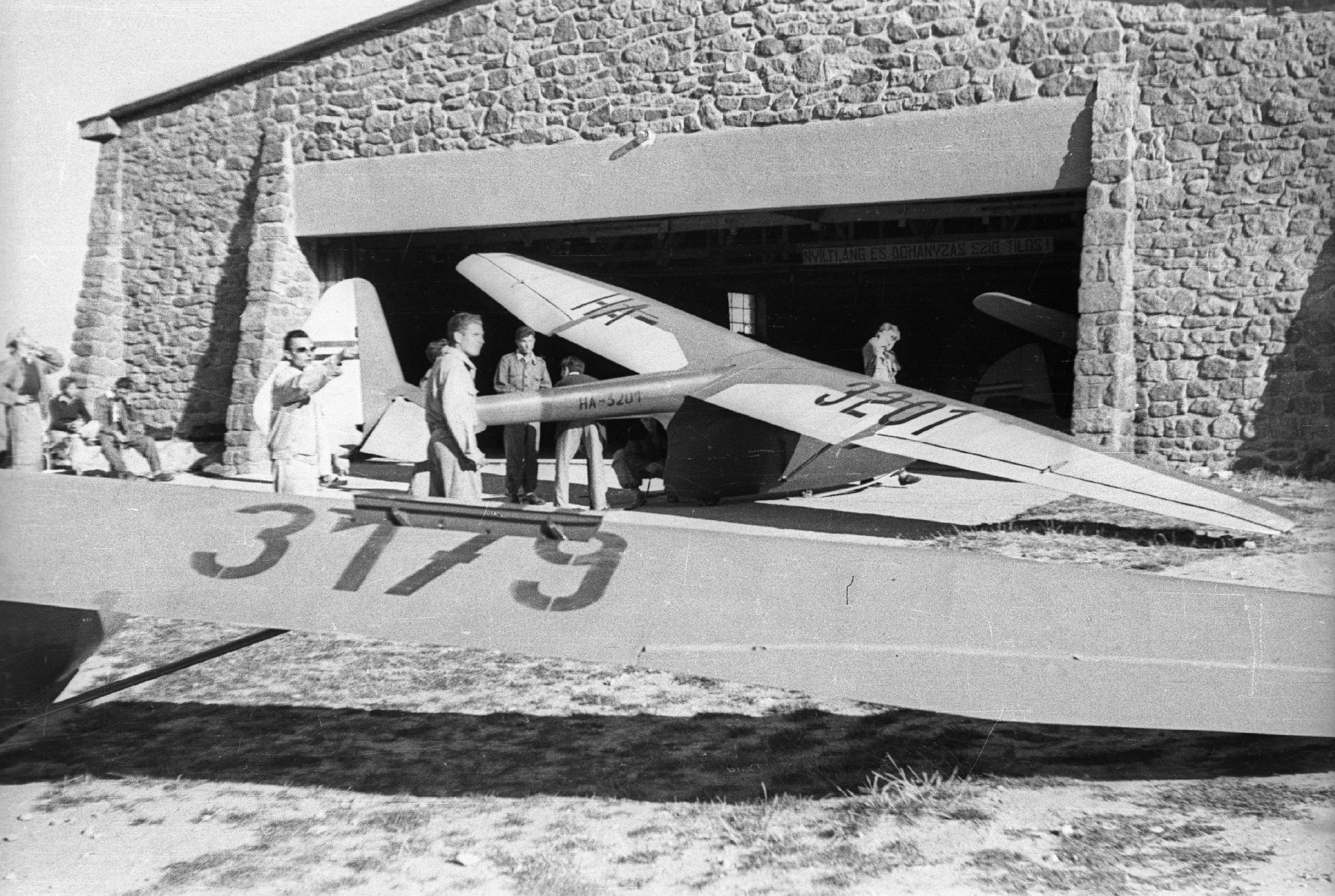

General information
- Type: Training glider
- National origin: Hungary
- Manufacturer: MÁV Istvántelki Főműhely (Istvántelki Workshop of the Hungarian Railways) (prototype); Sportárutermelő V. (former Aero Ever Ltd.), Esztergom. (production)
- Designer: Sándor Kemény
- Number built: 90

History
- First flight: 10 September 1949

The Kemény K-02 Szellő (Breeze) was a Hungarian training glider from the late 1940s. It was originally designed for a national contest to build a primary trainer but when this was won by the Rubik R-16 Lepke it was resigned to have more advanced soaring capability which could take pilots to their Silver C badge. Ninety were produced.

== Design and development ==
In 1948 the Hungarian National Aviation Association (Országos Magyar Repülö Egyesület or OMRE) announced a competition for single seat and two seat primary glider trainer designs. The winning single-seater was the Rubik R-16 Lepke, with Sandor Kemény's K-01 in second place. The following year gave Kemény an opportunity to build his design. So as to avoid competition with the R-16 he redesigned it into the K-02, with the help of György Mező from OMRE, so that it could ridge soar even in light winds.

The prototype of the K-02 Szellő was built by MÁV Istvántelki Főműhely (Istvántelki Workshop of the Hungarian Railways), first flying on 10 September 1949.

The Szellő was an all-wood, high wing, pod and boom design. Its wing had a rectangular inner section extending out to about half span, followed by tapered outer panels with most sweep on their trailing edges. There was a single main spar with plywood ahead of it around the leading edge, forming a torsion resistant D-box. Plywood also covered the wing ahead of an internal, diagonal drag strut on each side. Elsehere the wing was fabric-covered. Broad, parallel chord Frise-type ailerons filled the trailing edges of the outer panels. The prototype used a mixture of strut and wire bracing but the latter was omitted on the production K-02b Szellő. Each bracing strut ran from the bottom of the fuselage to the spar at 25% span. The prototype K-02 had no airbrakes but production K-02bs had Rubik-type brakes which had three horizontal close-spaced metal channels in both lower and upper brakes, each channel fitting within the next for compact retraction.

The pod was based upon a strong keel bearing transverse frames and with stringers strengthening its smooth, oval cross-section, plywood skin. The pilot's open cockpit below the wing leading edge also was supported by the keel. Behind the cockpit a four-sided box converged aft to triangular frames which supported the wing spar and the tail boom, giving the rear of the pod a near vertical but slightly forward leaning edge. There was a rubber-sprung landing skid under the keel. The prototype had another, short, skid at the rear of the pod but production Szellős landed on a semi-recessed, 260 mm (10 in) landing wheel.

The Szellő's ply-covered tailboom tapered slightly in plan rearwards but maintained its depth to the tail, where it included an integral, steep-edged and round-topped fin, a low step for the strut-braced tailplane and a small tail bumper. The round-tipped tailplane was only slightly tapered, as were the elevators, which had a deep cut-out for rudder movement and a port side trim tab. Its rudder was generous, slightly angular and reached down to the tail bumper.

== Operational history ==
The first production Szellő, built by Sportárutermelő V., Esztergo flew on 20 August 1950. In all 89 were built and flew on into the 1960s, enabling many Hungarian glider pilots to gain their Silver-C.

== Variants ==
K-02
Sole prototype, built by MÁV Istvántelki Főműhely (Istvántelki Workshop of the Hungarian Railways)
K-02b
Production model. Bracing wires removed, landing wheel and air brakes added. 89 built by Sportárutermelő V., Esztergom.

== Specifications (K-02b) ==
Data from Gabor, F,

General characteristics

- Crew: One
- Length: 6.5 m (21 ft 4 in)
- Wingspan: 12.6 m (41 ft 4 in)
- Wing area: 14.8 m^{2} (159 sq ft)
- Aspect ratio: 10.7
- Airfoil: Göttingen Gö 549 out to Gö 676 tips
- Empty weight: 130 kg (287 lb)
- Gross weight: 210 kg (463 lb)

Performance

- Maximum speed: 140 km/h (87 mph, 76 kn) never exceed
- Stall speed: 48 km/h (30 mph, 26 kn)
- Maximum glide ratio: 19 at 65 km/h (40 mph; 35 kn)
- Rate of sink: 0.9 m/s (180 ft/min) at 56 km/h (35 mph; 30 kn)
- Maximum speed in rough air: 110 km/h (68 mph; 59 kn)
