= Rubik R-26 Góbé =

Hungarian 1961 two-seat glider family

R-26 Góbé
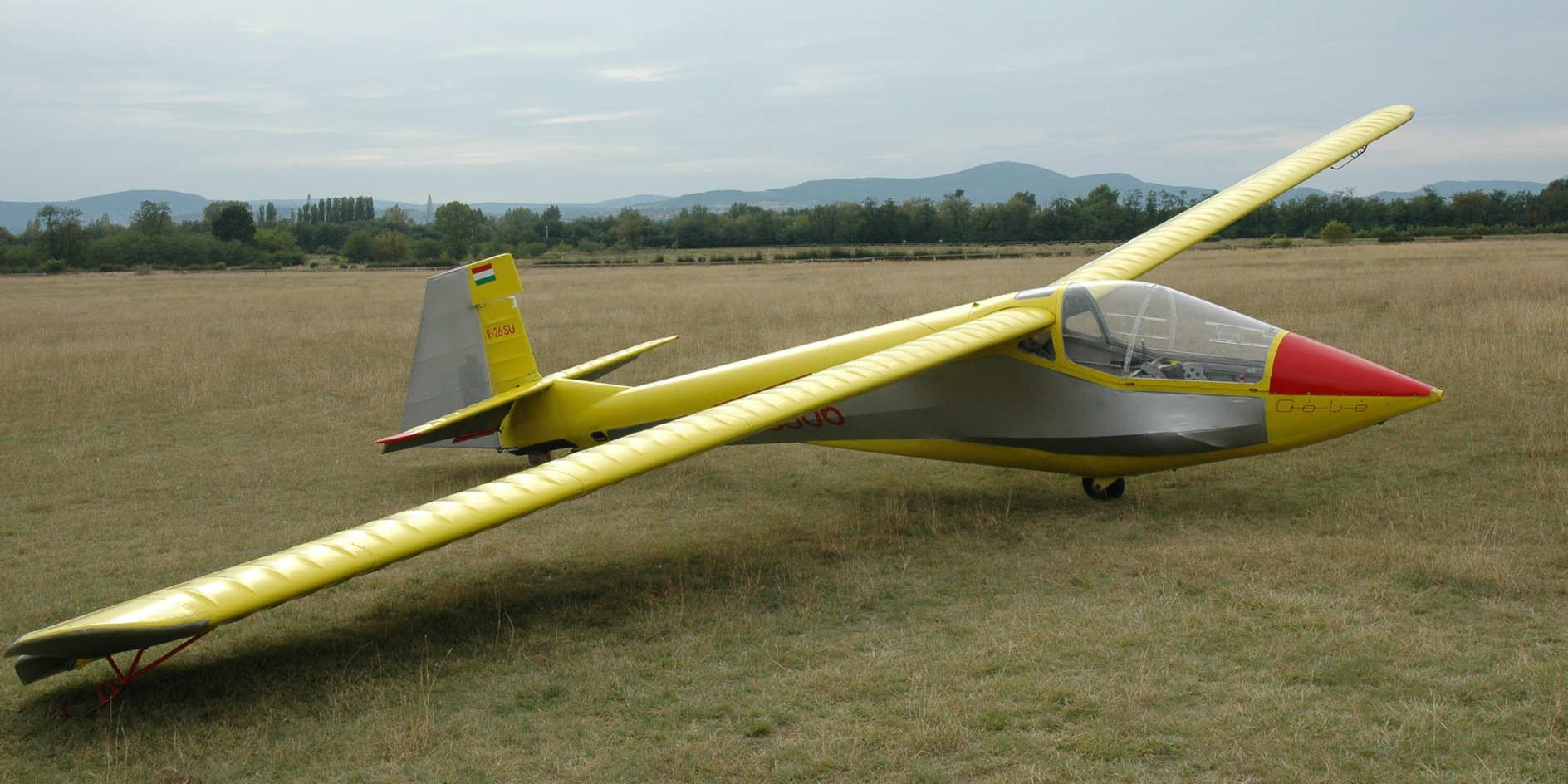

General information
- Type: Glider
- National origin: Hungary
- Manufacturer: Auto-Aero
- Designer: Ernő Rubik
- Status: Production completed
- Number built: 195

History
- Introduction date: 1963
- First flight: 6 May 1961

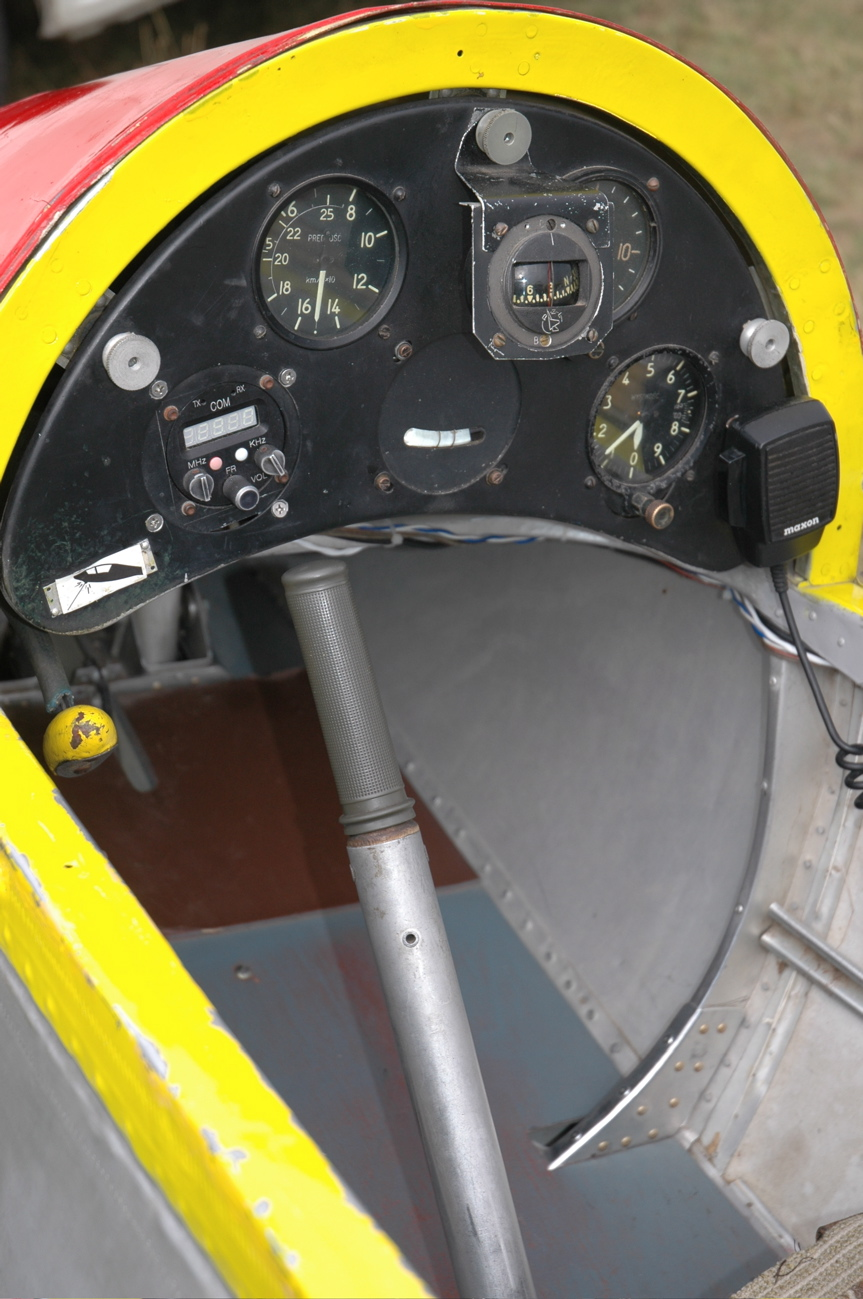
R-26SU instrument panel

The Rubik R-26 Góbé is a family of Hungarian shoulder-wing, two-seat training gliders that was designed by Ernő Rubik Sr. (father of Rubik's Cube inventor Ernő Rubik), and produced by Auto-Aero. After its introduction the R-26 Góbé became the de facto training glider type in Hungary and is still used by many clubs for basic instruction.

== Development ==
One of a series of all-metal gliders designed by Rubik from 1957 onwards, the R-26 Góbé was intended to provide two-seat instruction, with the rear seat raised for a view forward. Series production started in 1962 and the first production aircraft flew in August 1963. Almost 200 were produced.

== Design ==
The R-26 Góbé is of predominately aluminium monocoque construction. The wings have a metal D-box ahead of a single main spar, covered in corrugated aluminum alloy sheets, aft of the spar they are covered in doped fabric. The wing has a modified a Goettingen 549 airfoil; the perforated Schempp-Hirth air brakes extend from the upper and lower wing surfaces. The slatted Frise ailerons are covered in doped fabric. The corrugated aluminum sheets on the leading edges proved to be stiff enough, having enabled Rubik to use significantly less ribs and rivets compared to similar all-metal constructions. The result was lower production costs, and - along with the extensive use of fabric on the trailing edges and on the fuselage - an empty weight comparable to that of a single-seat glider. The landing gear consists of a fixed monowheel and a tail skid. The balanced rudder is notably large and effective.

The V-tail of the first prototype was judged unsuitable for training and was replaced on the second prototype and production aircraft by a conventional unit.

The aircraft controls are attached to the control surfaces with pushrods, the trim handle is attached to the trim tab with bowden cables.

The instructor seat is not equipped with instruments; the rear seat is raised in order to give the instructor a view on the instruments mounted in front of the student. A separate rear seat instrument kit was available as optional equipment, making the glider capable for instrument (IFR) training.

The R-26S was designed to be easy to disassemble for ground transportation via trailer.

== Operational history ==
193 production Góbés were built; most serving in Hungary. Fifteen were exported to Cuba, one to the United Kingdom and one to Austria.

It was not type certificated in the United States; the one imported was registered with the Federal Aviation Administration in the Experimental - Exhibition category. As of April 2018, it is privately owned and based in Augusta, New Jersey.

In mid-2010 seventy R-26S and fifty-seven R-26SU remained on the Hungarian civil register.

== Variants ==
R-26P1
First prototype, first flown in May 1961. V-tail.

R-26P2
Second prototype, first flown in August 1961. Conventional tail.

R-26S Góbé
Production aircraft, built from 1963. 115 produced.

R-26SU Góbé '82
Modified to meet European/US market requirements. Production begun in 1982, totalling 78.

R-26M Motor Góbé
A two-stroke engine was mounted on one of the R-26S models for experimental purposes. The aircraft was later reverted to standard R-26S configuration.

== Aircraft on display ==
- R-26S HA-5355 is on display in the Transport Museum of Budapest.
- R-26S HA-5410 is on display in the Museum of Hungarian Aviation, Szolnok.
- R-26S HA-5392 is on display in the Slovak Technical Museum, Košice.
- R-26SU HA-5550 is on display in the Eötvös Loránd University Savaria University Center, Szombathely.

== Specifications (R-26S) ==
R-26S Góbé

Data from Sailplane Directory and Soaring The World's Sailplanes:Die Segelflugzeuge der Welt:Les Planeurs du Monde Volume II

General characteristics

- Crew: one
- Capacity: one passenger
- Wingspan: 14.0 m (45 ft 11 in)
- Wing area: 18.000 m^{2} (193.75 sq ft)
- Aspect ratio: 10.88:1
- Airfoil: Goettingen 549
- Empty weight: 230 kg (507 lb)
- Gross weight: 440 kg (970 lb)

Performance

- Stall speed: 60 km/h (37 mph, 32 kn)
- Never exceed speed: 170 km/h (110 mph, 92 kn)
- Rough air speed max: 110 km/h (68 mph)
- Aerotow speed: 110 km/h (68 mph)
- Winch launch speed: 110 km/h (68 mph)
- g limits: +2.8 -1 at 170 km/h (110 mph)
- Maximum glide ratio: 23.7:1 at 81 km/h (50 mph)
- Rate of sink: 0.96 m/s (189 ft/min) at 75 km/h (47 mph)
- Wing loading: 20.56 kg/m^{2} (4.21 lb/sq ft) at normal gross weight, 22.22 kg/m^{2} (4.55 lb/sq ft) at maximum take-off weight

== See also ==
Aircraft of comparable role, configuration, and era

- Schweizer SGS 2-33

Related lists

- List of gliders
- List of Hungarian gliders
