= Rubik R-27 Kópé =

Hungarian glider

R-27 Kópé

General information
- Type: Training glider
- National origin: Hungary
- Manufacturer: Esztergom Facility of Pest Area Machine Factory (PGE)
- Designer: Ernő Rubik
- Number built: 2

History
- First flight: 7 October 1961 or 7 March 1962

The Rubik R-27 Kópé (Imp), a single-seat trainer, was one of three similar, metal-framed Hungarian gliders. Two prototypes were flown in the early 1960s but the type did not reach production.

== Design and development ==
R-27 P2

In 1958 the Hungarian Defence League (Magyar Honvédelmi Szövetség or MHSz) placed an order for three related glider designs, to fill the roles of two-seat trainer, single-seat trainer and Standard Class competition aircraft, with the Esztergom Facility of Pest County Machine Factory (PGE). They specified that these should build on experience with the Rubik R-23 Gébics and have similar light-alloy structures to it. The three new designs were to have, as far as possible, similar components to simplify construction, similar flight characteristics for ease of pilot transfer and similar maintenance requirements.

The two-seat Rubik R-26 Góbé was first of these three to fly, followed by the Standard Class Rubik R-25 Mokány then, two years later, by the single-seat Kópé. Two versions of the Kópé were built, the P1 and P2, which differed most obviously in their tails (the P1 V-form and the P2 conventional), but also in their forward fuselages.

The Kópé had a shortened version of the Góbé's two part shoulder wing, with a span of 12 m (39 ft 4 in) rather than 14 m (45 ft 11 in). Its plan was rectangular out to rounded tips which had steel tubes for landing protection and ease of ground handling. It was built around a single main dural spar, assisted by an inboard, internal drag strut. Forward of the main spar the wing was dural-covered with Rubik's characteristic corrugations, forming a torsion resistant D-box. Behind the spar the wing was fabric-covered. Broad-chord Frise-type ailerons occupied about 40% of the trailing edges and Göppingen type spoilers, opening above and below the wing, were mounted just behind the spar at about mid-span.

The Kópé P1's forward fuselage was similar to that of the Mokány. There were a pair of dural frames underneath the wings and joined to them. From their lower edges a dural keel projected forward, supporting the pilot's seat and a pointed, dural-skinned nose. The cockpit's removable one-piece canopy smoothly followed the fuselage contours to the wing leading edge. The keel also carried a semi-recessed, sprung monowheel with brakes, placed under the forward wing, and a short protective skid. The P2's forward fuselage differed by being 400 mm (16 in) longer, with an extended bubble canopy and raised seat which allowed the fuselage depth to be decreased. The rear fuselage of both prototypes was similar to that of the Góbé, with a semi-circular section monocoque upper part and frames and formers below producing flat, sloping sides and a rounded bottom. In profile the rear lower fuselage of the P1 was arched, like the Góbé, whereas the less deep forward fuselage of P2 produced a straight underside.

The more obvious external difference between the two prototypes was in their tails. The P1 had a V-tail with its metal-framed, fabric-covered surfaces set 90° apart. Overall, these surfaces were roughly quadrantal, with straight leading edges. Trapezoidal fixed surfaces occupied 30% of the surface and balanced control surfaces the rest. The P2 had a conventional tail with dural-covered fixed surfaces and fabric-covered control surfaces. The fin was trapezoidal and the rudder angular. The high aspect ratio tailplane was rectangular in plan, with tapered elevators.

Both prototypes were test-flown and gained airworthiness certification but by the spring of 1963 the two-seat Góbé had proved capable of also filling the solo trainer role so it, rather than the Kópé, went into production.

== Variants ==
R-27 P1
V-tail. First flown 7 October 1961 or 7 March 1962. One built.
R-27 P2
Conventional tail. First flown 16 December 1963. One built.

== Specifications (R-27 P2) ==
Data from Gabor, F

General characteristics

- Crew: One
- Length: 7.4 m (24 ft 3 in)
- Wingspan: 12 m (39 ft 4 in)
- Wing area: 14 m^{2} (150 sq ft)
- Aspect ratio: 10.3
- Airfoil: Modified Göttingen Gö 549
- Empty weight: 190 kg (419 lb)
- Gross weight: 300 kg (661 lb)
- Dihedral: 3°

Performance

- Maximum speed: 195 km/h (121 mph, 105 kn) VNE and max with airbrakes open
- Maximum glide ratio: 22
- Rate of sink: 1.0 m/s (200 ft/min) minimum
- Maximum speed in rough air: 110 km/h (68 mph; 59 kn)
