= Rubik R-25 Mokány =

R-25 Mokány
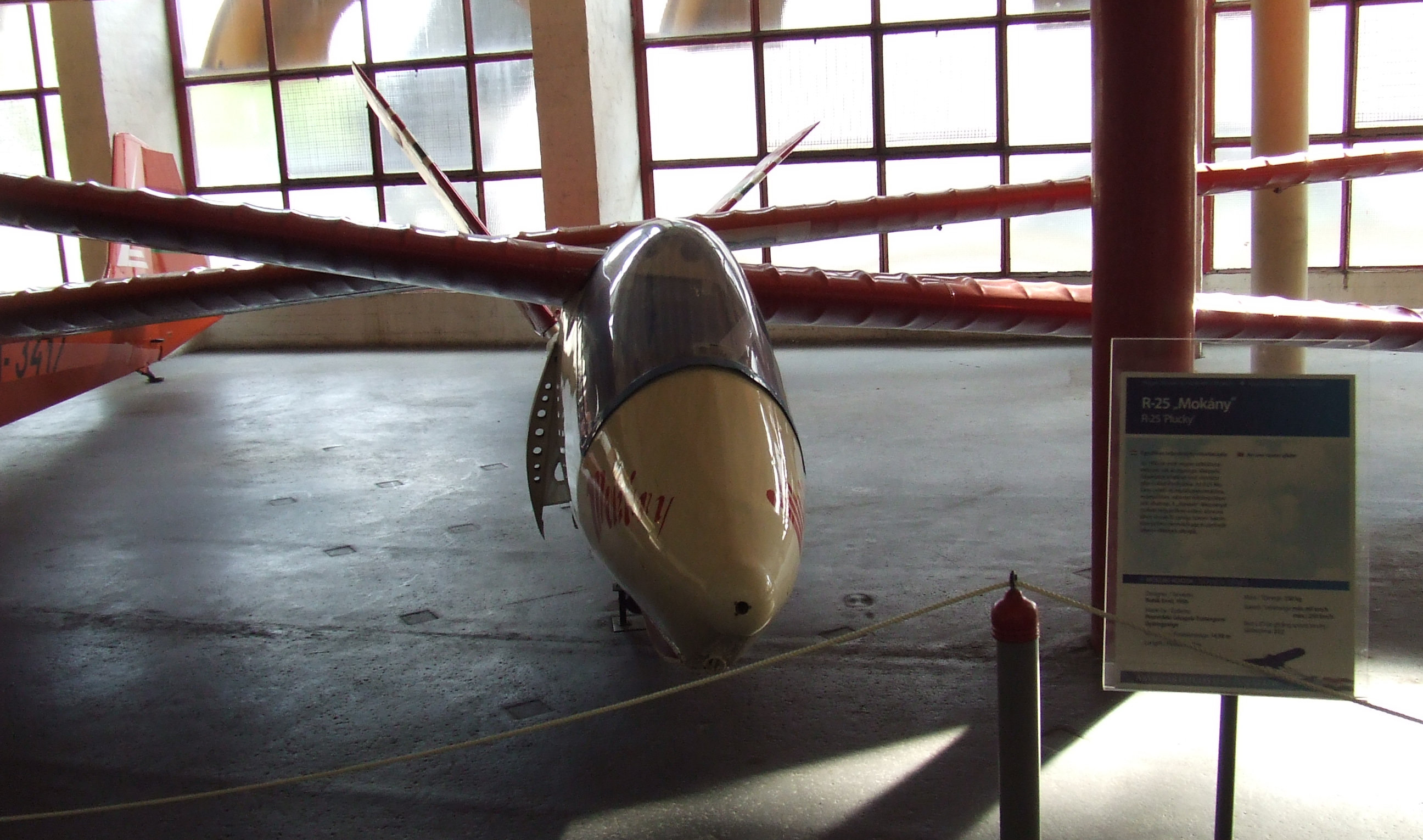

General information
- Type: Single seat standard class competition glider
- National origin: Hungary
- Manufacturer: Műszeripari Művek Esztergom
- Designer: Ernő Rubik
- Number built: 1

History
- First flight: 29 September 1960

The Rubik R-25 Mokány, in English: Plucky person and sometimes known as the R-25 Standard (class), is a Hungarian single seat Standard Class glider of all-metal construction, first flown in 1960. It was one of a series of similar aircraft designed by Ernő Rubik. Only one was built.

== Design and development ==
In 1957 a team led by Ernő Rubik designed an all-metal glider, the R-23 Gébics, with a pod and boom fuselage, V-tail, fuselage mounted fan airbrakes and corrugated wing skinning. These features were carried forward into a series of gliders that included the R-25 Mokány. This was designed to compete as a Standard Class glider, with a span increased to 15 m (49 ft 5½ in), and introduced a laminar flow NACA 64 series wing profile.

Its straight tapered, high cantilever wing has forward sweep on the trailing edge alone. It is built around a single spar with a D-shaped torsion box formed by the corrugated leading section, the ridges running chordwise. The wing is fabric covered aft of the spar, apart from an outer, metal skinned area carrying Frise ailerons. The all moving V-tail, with 90° separation and fitted with anti-balance tabs, has similar construction and plan as the wings.

The metal skinned fuselage of the Mokány has a circular cross section from the tail forwards to a point a little behind the wing trailing edge where it develops into a deep ellipse, though maintaining the horizontal upper line forward to the leading edge. Beyond this, the cockpit is covered by a single piece blown canopy; the nose is sharply pointed. There is a fixed, partially enclosed and rubber sprung monowheel undercarriage, fitted with a brake and assisted by a small tail skid. Instead of the more usual wing mounted airbrakes, the Mokány has fuselage mounted brakes which open through 90° in fan fashion, with one on either side below the wings at about 25% chord.

The Mokány is fully aerobatic and equipped for cloud flying.

== Aircraft on display ==
The sole Mokány, HA-4300, is on display in the Transport Museum of Budapest.

== Specifications (R-25 Mokány) ==
Data from Jane's All the World's Aircraft 1962-3 The World's Sailplanes:Die Segelflugzeuge der Welt:Les Planeurs du Monde Volume II

General characteristics

- Crew: 1
- Length: 7.30 m (23 ft 11 in)
- Wingspan: 14.98 m (49 ft 2 in)
- Wing area: 11.2 m^{2} (121 sq ft)
- Aspect ratio: 20.09
- Airfoil: NACA 64_{3}618
- Empty weight: 185 kg (408 lb)
- Gross weight: 284 kg (626 lb)
- Max takeoff weight: 310 kg (683 lb)

Performance

- Stall speed: 64 km/h (40 mph, 35 kn)
- Never exceed speed: 220 km/h (140 mph, 120 kn) still air
- Rough air speed max: 165 km/h (102.5 mph; 89.1 kn)
- Aerotow speed: 135 km/h (83.9 mph; 72.9 kn)
- Winch launch speed: 115 km/h (71.5 mph; 62.1 kn)
- Maximum glide ratio: 31.2 at 82 km/h (51.0 mph; 44.3 kn)
- Rate of sink: 0.68 m/s (134 ft/min) minimum, at 74.5 km/h (46.3 mph; 40.2 kn)
- Wing loading: 25.36 kg/m^{2} (5.19 lb/sq ft) at normal loaded weight, 27.68 (5.67 lb/sqft) at maximum take-off weight
