= Hungarian Technical and Transportation Museum =

Museum in Budapest, Hungary

Coordinates: 47.514203°N 19.091664°E

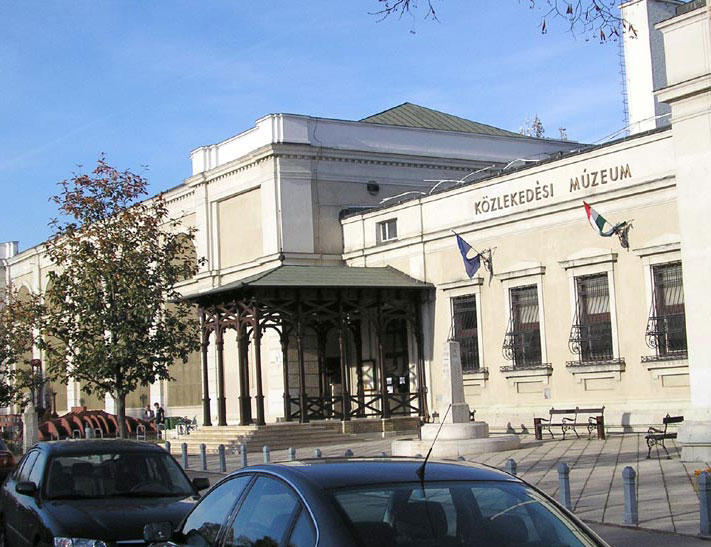
The main entrance of the old building of Hungarian Museum of Science, Technology and Transport

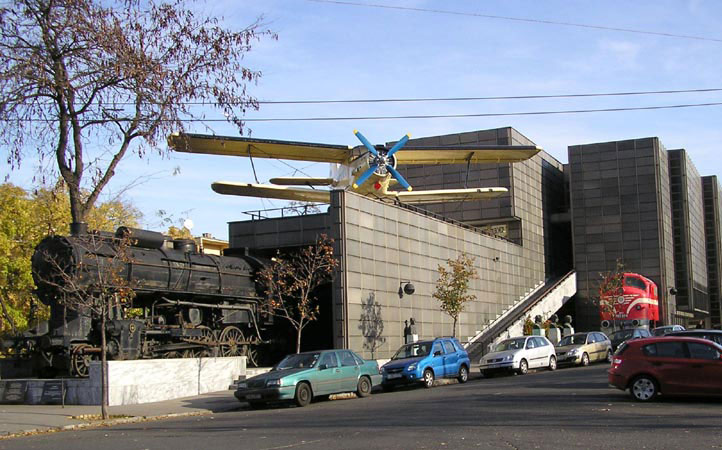
Locomotives and an Antonov An-2 aircraft outside newly demolished building of the Hungarian Museum of Science, Technology and Transport

The Magyar Műszaki és Közlekedési Múzeum (Hungarian pronunciation: [ˈmɒɟɒr ˈmyːsɒki ˈeːʃ ˈkøzlɛkɛdeːʃi ˈmuːzɛum]; "Hungarian Technical and Transportation Museum"), still often referred to by its former name, Közlekedési Múzeum ("Transportation Museum"), is a museum in Budapest, Hungary. It is one of Europe's oldest transportation collections.

The museum has a unique collection of locomotives and railway cars on a 1:5 scale. This means that a locomotive of, for example, 10 m length is reproduced with all details in a 2 m length model. The models represent a wide range of railway technology. The museum shows also a locomotive and wagon in real size with a railway station of the 1900s.

Other parts of the museum are shown:

- The history of road traffic: horse-drawn and machine-driven vehicles, road and bridge building with a collection of old cars, motorcycles, and bicycles.
- The history of sailing. Sailing from the prehistoric ages, the history of Hungarian boat manufacturing is shown by models.
- Deeper in the park there is a permanent exhibition about the history of flight and space flight, including original Hungarian and foreign aircraft, including a Junkers F-13, the first all-metal transport aircraft. It also has the cabin of the first Hungarian astronaut, Bertalan Farkas. The exhibition also demonstrates the development of engines and instruments and modern rocket engineering techniques.

The history of city transportation shows the public traffic in Buda and Pest before the appearance of trams and omnibuses.

The museum also owns the collection of planes in Aeropark, an aviation museum dedicated to the history of Hungarian civil aviation, next to Budapest Ferenc Liszt International Airport.

== Visitor information ==
- Address: 11 Városligeti körút, XIV Budapest

Southeastern corner of City Park

The museum is temporarily closed due to reconstruction. After rebuilding, a completely new building will be erected for the renewed collection. For further information, please visit http://kozlekedesimuzeum.hu/

== Sources ==
- Közlekedési Múzeum homepage
