= Czerwiński =

Czerwiński (feminine Czerwińska) is a Polish surname. Russian-language equivalent: Chervinsky. Notable people with the surname include:

- Alan Czerwiński (born 1993), Polish footballer
- Andrzej Czerwiński (born 1954) is a Polish politician
- Anna Czerwińska (1949–2023), Polish mountaineer
- Eugeniusz Czerwiński (1887–1930), Polish architect
- George Czerwinski, member of the Wisconsin State Assembly and the Wisconsin State Senate
- Jakub Czerwiński, Polish footballer
- Joseph Czerwinski (1944–1998), American legislator
- Krzysztof Czerwiński (born 1980), Polish conductor, organist and voice teacher
- Mary Czerwinski, American cognitive scientist and computer-human interaction
- Paweł Czerwiński (born 1965), Polish diplomat
- Pete Czerwinski (born Piotr Czerwinski; 1985), Canadian competitive eater and YouTube personality
- Przemysław Czerwiński (born 1983), Polish pole vaulter
- Ryszard Czerwiński (born 1954), Polish boxer
- Tadeusz Czerwiński (born 1964), Polish sports shooter
- Zbigniew Czerwiński (speedway rider), (born 1982), Polish motorcycle speedway rider
- Zofia Czerwińska (1933–2019), Polish actress

== See also ==
- Czerwiński and Jaworski CWJ, basic training glider
- Czerwiński CW I, Polish glider
- Czerwiński CW II, Polish open frame glider
- Czerwiński CW IV, Polish high performance glider
- Czerwiński-Shenstone Harbinger, Canadian sailplane
- Czerwinski-Shenstone UTG-1 Loudon, Canadian sailplane
- Czerwiński Sparrow, sometimes known as the de Havilland Canada glider
- Sergiuz Czerwiński glider, simple, open frame, monoplane glider
