= Richard Levy Gallery =

Coordinates: 35.08466°N 106.65346°W

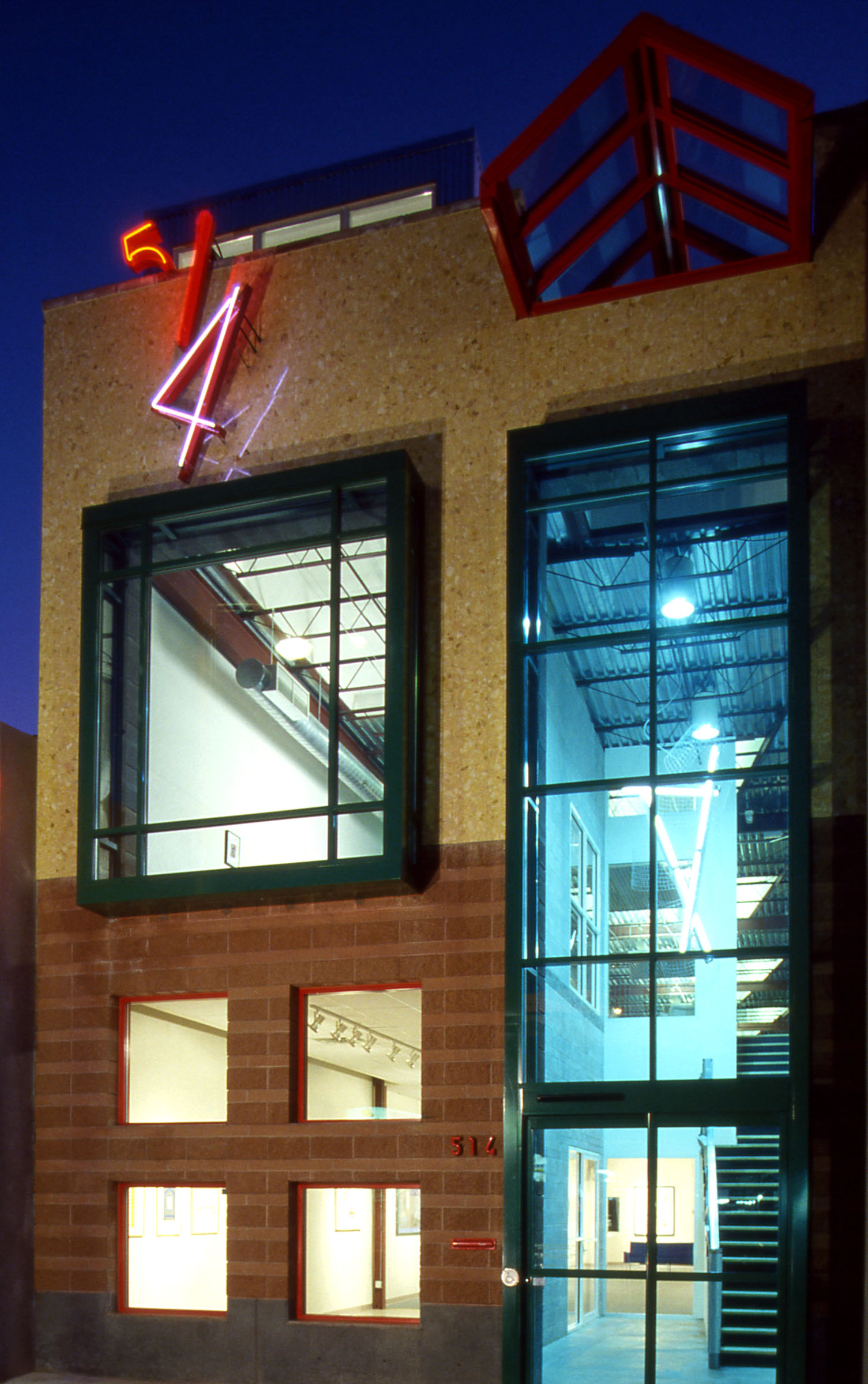
Richard Levy Gallery

Richard Levy Gallery, established in 1991 in downtown Albuquerque, New Mexico, specializes in contemporary art. The gallery program includes work by John Baldessari, Thomas Barrow, Wilson Bentley, William Betts, Debra Bloomfield, Xuan Chen, John Chervinsky, Constance DeJong, Richard Estes, Alex Katz, Jeff Kellar, Jay Kelly, Jenna Kuiper, Isa Leshko, Matt Magee, Rania Matar, Matthew McConville, Emi Ozawa, Gordon Parks, Antoine Predock, Willy Bo Richardson, Ed Ruscha, Manjari Sharma, Eric Tillinghast, Mary Tsiongas, James Turrell, Tom Waldron, and Pablo Zuleta Zahr. The gallery has participated in special global initiatives like 2015 On the Map: Unfolding Albuquerque Art + Design, ISEA 2012: Machine Wilderness and 2009's LAND/ART New Mexico.

== History ==
In the 1970s Richard Levy moved to Albuquerque to study the history of photography with Beaumont Newhall at the University of New Mexico. In 1991 Richard Levy Gallery opened as a print gallery by appointment only and began publishing waterless lithographs with Jeffrey Ryan under the name 21 Steps Editions. Together they published works by James Casebere, Adam Henry, David Levinthal, Robert ParkeHarrison, Lorna Simpson, and Richard Tuttle.
