= Willy Bo Richardson =

American artist

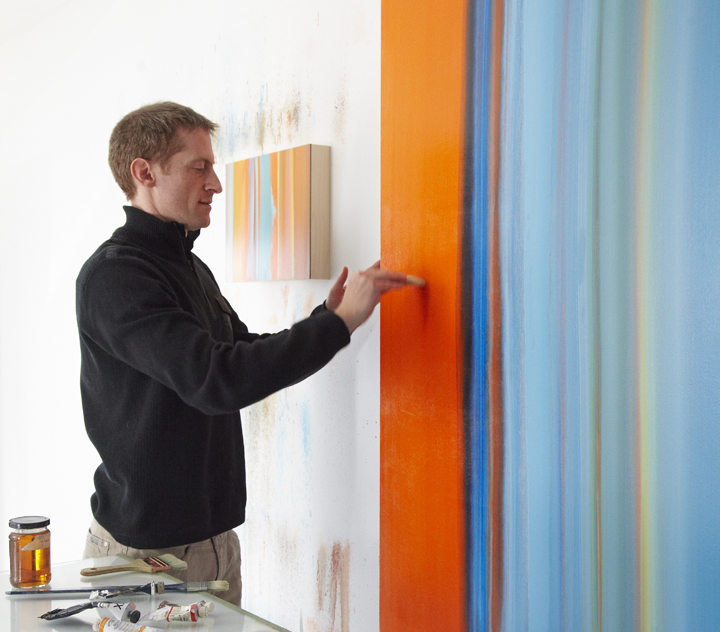
- Richardson in the studio
- Born: June 8, 1974 (age 52); Santa Fe, New Mexico
- Education: University of Wisconsin, UT Austin, and MFA at Pratt Institute
- Known for: Painting

Willy Bo Richardson (born June 8, 1974) is an American artist regarded as one of many contemporary painters revisiting late Modernism. Describing his paintings as “philosophy in motion,” he paints large scale canvases in vertical fluid strokes, using a non-linear approach. Richardson States, “When 'disruptions' are a norm, perhaps what we are looking for is a loadstone that points towards consistency and quietude.”

== Early life and education ==
Richardson grew up in a creative environment; his father is an artist (painter) and master wood-worker, and his mother was a counselor and founded the first mediation center in Santa Fe.

He studied at UW Madison and received a BA from University of Texas at Austin. While at UT Austin, he counted Peter Saul and Linda Montano among his teachers. Richardson received an MFA at Pratt Institute in Brooklyn in 2000. He and his wife lived in New York City for a decade.

== Career ==
Richardson worked as a painting technician at Cooper Union from 2001-2007. He taught painting and color theory at Santa Fe University of Art and Design from 2009-2016.

He exhibits his paintings internationally. In 2011 his work was included in the exhibition curated by Stephanie Buhmann at Jason McCoy Gallery in New York titled, "70 Years of Abstract Painting – Excerpts". The show assembled works by a selection of modern and contemporary painters, including Cora Cohen, Thomas Nozkowski, Josef Albers, Hans Hofmann and Jackson Pollock. In 2012 he showed a body of work in the exhibition "Watercolors”" at the Phillips de Pury headquarters in Chelsea New York, artists included Alexis Rockman and Eric Fischl.

In 2014 Richardson was selected to be one of the SITE Santa Fe SPREAD finalists. His work and vision was featured on the PBS weekly arts series ¡Colores!. Richardson's painting titled "Number 1," 1999 was acquired by the Albuquerque Museum of Art and History in 2018. He was a guest artist at the Tamarind Institute at the University of New Mexico in 2019. In October 2026, Richardson was the featured speaker for CreativeMornings Santa Fe, held at the Center for Contemporary Arts (CCA) in the Muñoz-Waxman Gallery.

Richardson is represented by Richard Levy Gallery in Albuquerque, New Mexico; Nüart Gallery on Canyon Road in Santa Fe, New Mexico and also in Santa Monica, California; and Skot Foreman Gallery in San Miguel de Allende.

Regarding his own repute within the art world, he has stated that it is "actually dangerous to be popular".

== Work ==
By the late 1990s painting had been declared “dead” several times over. But for the contemporary painter Willy Bo Richardson, painting became a "practice" to orient himself and find meaning in a post-modern world. Richardson states, "Painting as a medium still takes root in our historic pre-verbal psyche."

Influenced by Robert Irwin’s large scale scrim installation in 1998 titled Prologue: x 18³ at the Dia Art Foundation on 22nd street, Richardson set out to "influence space" with paintings. Richardson States, ″What blew me away, was Irwin’s comprehension and ability to point to space... Irwin was able to hold my attention with this liminal wonderment. So I asked myself if painting could be a vehicle to do the same.″

Richardson's paintings have attracting power and intriguing spacial effects. Colors not only shift within bands of color, but shift within strokes. Joseph Albers used the term "vibrating boundaries" to explain the effect of colors in close proximity that are near-contrasting. Richardson experiments with multiple canvases at the same time, exploring color and spontaneous compositional ideas.

== Bibliography ==
- Music to Drive To. Eastern Gate Publishing (2026). ISBN 979-8-23406-376-2.
