= Kucka =

Kucka is a Slavic surname. Notable people with the surname include:

- Juraj Kucka (born 1987), Slovak football player
- Kathleen Kucka (born 1962), American painter
