= Cora Cohen =

American artist (1943–2023)

- Cohen in 2008
- Born: October 19, 1943; New York City, New York, U.S.
- Died: June 22, 2023 (aged 79); Brooklyn, New York, U.S.
- Education: Bennington College
- Known for: Abstract painting
- Website: www.coracohen.com

Cora Cohen (October 19, 1943 – June 22, 2023) was an American artist whose works include paintings, drawings, photographs, and altered x-rays. Cohen is most known for her abstract paintings and is often identified as continuing the tradition of American Abstraction. In a 2023 review in Artforum Barry Schwabsky suggested that "Cohen’s determination to evade stylistic consistency has made her one of the most underrated painters in New York." The New York Times' critic Michael Brenson wrote of her 1984 exhibition, Portraits of Women: "The works are dense, brooding and yet elated. The turbulence of the paint not only looks but also feels like freedom." Cohen interviewed many other artists also associated with continuing the tradition of American Abstraction for Bomb Magazine including; Ralph Humphrey, Dona Nelson, Craig Fisher, Carl Ostendarp, and Joan Mitchell. Her work has also been identified with traditions of European abstraction, and specifically German abstraction, including the work of Wols, Sigmar Polke, Gerhard Richter. She began exhibiting in Germany in the early nineties and continued to show at some of its most prestigious institutions.

== Early life and education ==
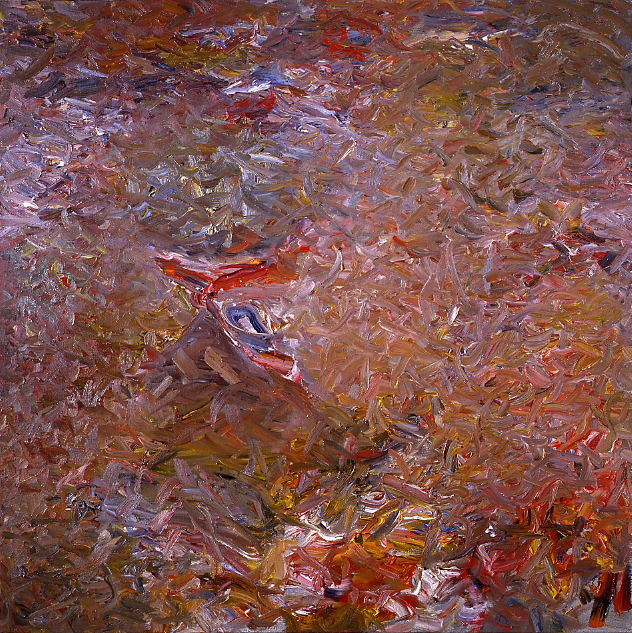
Replace the Beloved, 1984, 60 x 60 inches, oil on linen.

Cora Cohen was born in New York City. She attended the High School of Music & Art (1957–60) and Bennington College (1960–64), where she studied with Paul Feeley, and Lawrence Alloway. Cohen was Artist in Residence in Painting at the University of Pennsylvania (1969–70), after which she returned to Bennington College as a graduate student (1970–72). During this time, she studied with Richard Haas, and met sound artist Liz Phillips who introduced her to new music, in particular that of Pauline Oliveros and Steve Reich. In this work Cohen found reinforcement for using traditional art materials to create decompositional abstractions.

== Career ==
Cohen's first solo museum exhibition was initiated by James Harithas at the Everson Museum of Art in 1974. She began exhibiting regularly in New York City at the Max Hutchinson Gallery in 1976. Cohen exhibited widely from the late eighties onward, in New York City at the Holly Solomon Gallery, and Wolff Gallery. In the early nineties she began exhibiting in Europe. In 2008, her exhibition Come in a Little Closer at Michael Steinberg Fine Art received wide attention. It was written about in The New York Times, artcritical.com, and reviewed in depth in The Brooklyn Rail by Joan Waltemath who wrote, "her brushstrokes...hover between the task of delineating form and the state of becoming form. They mimic the fluctuation between being and reflecting on being and so embody the Cartesian dualism that determines our consciousness."

The first exhibition of Cohen's altered x rays, her works on exposed x ray films in which cuts and other interventions subvert or enhance the image, was held at The Field Institute Hombroich, Museum Insel Hombroich, Neuss in 2011. In 2013, The Responsibility of Forms, an exhibition of Cohen's 2012-13 paintings that examine a place between uncertainty and sureness was held at Guided by Invoices, New York. It was written about extensively, in artcritical.com, The Huffington Post and The Brooklyn Rail. In 2013, a selection of drawings from 2007 to 2013 was exhibited at Galerie Hafemann, Wiesbaden.

During her later years, Cohen's work was exhibited in many group exhibitions throughout the United States and abroad, including, 70 Years of Abstract Painting - Excerpts, 2011, curated by Stephanie Buhmann at the Jason McCoy Gallery, New York; Auf Papier, 2011, at Galerie Hafemann, Wiesbaden; Invitational Exhibition of Visual Arts 2012, at the American Academy of Arts and Letters, New York; Assembly 2012, at Edward Thorp Gallery, New York; Paper Band, 2012, curated by Stephanie Simmons at Jason McCoy Gallery, New York, with Frederick Kiesler, Lee Krasner, Jim Lee, etc., and Season Review 2013, at Edward Thorp Gallery, New York with Andrew Guenther, June Leaf, and Henri Michaux.

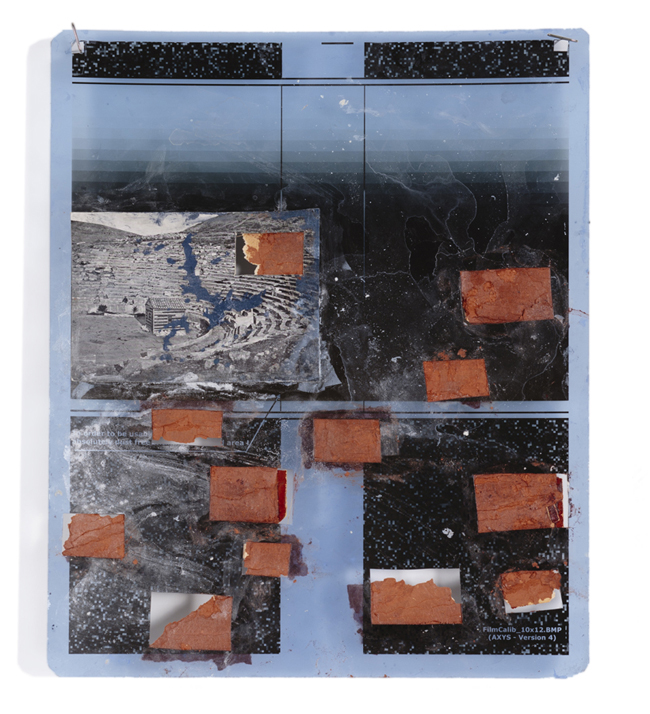
R88, 2011, 30.2 x 25.1 cm, leather, paper and pigment on roentgenograph

Cohen was the recipient of awards from the Yaddo Foundation (1982), the National Endowment for the Arts (1987), the New York Foundation for the Arts (1989), the Pollock-Krasner Foundation (1998), the Adolph and Esther Gottlieb Foundation (1990, 2006), the Marie Walsh Sharpe Foundation Space Program (2008), and the Edward F. Albee Foundation Residency (2009). Her painting, Curtain, 2008, 75 x 103” (190.5 x 261.62 cm) received a purchase award from the American Academy of Arts and Letters (2012), and she was the recipient of a John Simon Guggenheim Memorial Foundation Fellowship (2013).

Cohen was a frequent guest teacher and lecturer at various institutions including The School of the Art Institute of Chicago, Columbia University School of the Arts, Maryland Institute College of Art, and Medicine Hat College, Alberta.

== Personal life and death ==
Cohen lived and worked in Long Island City and continued to spend time in Germany. She died on June 22, 2023, at the age of 79.

== Collections ==
Cohen’s works are in many public collections, including The Swedish State Art Council (Stockholm), The Ulla and Heiner Pietzsch Collection (Berlin), the Weatherspoon Art Museum (Greensboro), Yale University (New Haven), The William and Uytendale Scott Memorial Study Collection of Works by Women of The Bryn Mawr College Art and Archaeology Collection (Bryn Mawr), the Neuberger Museum of Art, and Purchase College, (Purchase, New York).
