= David Stephenson (photographer) =

American-Australian photographer

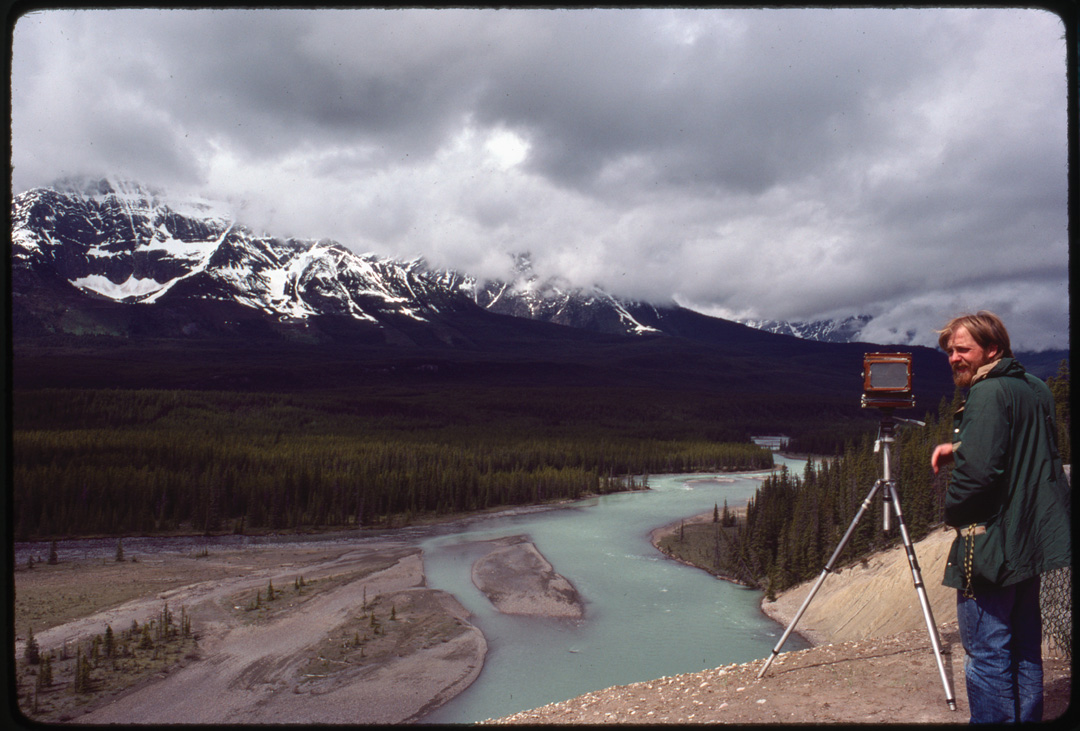
David Stephenson working with a Deardorff 5"x7" view camera along the Athabasca River, Jasper, Canada, 12 June 1981

David Stephenson (born 1955) is an American-Australian fine art photographer known for his representations of the sublime. His photographic subjects have included landscapes from America to Australia, the Arctic and Antarctica, the Southern Ocean, European sacred architecture, and day- and nighttime skyscapes. He has lived in Tasmania since 1982.

== Early life and education ==
David Stephenson was born in 1955 in Washington, D.C., the third child of two scientists, Elizabeth W. and John L. Stephenson. While attending public schools in suburban Maryland, he took Saturday classes at the Corcoran School of the Arts and Design under artists including Juan Downey. Drawn to nature and the environment from an early age, he was inspired by the writings and environmental advocacy of John Muir. His love of the mountains drew him to Colorado, where he began undergraduate studies in the sciences and humanities at the University of Colorado Boulder in 1973. Classes with Gary Metz stimulated his growing interest in photography, and he completed a BFA in studio art and a BA in art history in 1979. In Colorado he also met Robert Adams, who lived in nearby Longmont and was an early mentor. He moved to Albuquerque in 1979 to start graduate studies at the University of New Mexico, working under Thomas Barrow, Beaumont Newhall, and Van Deren Coke. Photographing across the American Southwest and California from 1979 to 1981 with a large format camera, and inspired by artistic precedents from Carleton Watkins to Robert Smithson, he produced his first major body of work, New Monuments, which focussed on industrial structures in the landscape. After completing a Master of Arts in 1980, he was awarded a National Endowment for the Arts grant, which allowed him to travel to Alaska in 1981 to photograph the newly completed Trans-Alaska Pipeline. Responding to the Pipeline’s linearity and influenced by 19th century photographers such as Watkins, he first worked with panoramic composites in Alaska, a pictorial strategy he would return to periodically for subsequent series. Stephenson completed a Master of Fine Arts at the University of New Mexico in 1982 with an exhibition of the Alaskan panoramas, and a dissertation on the 19th century photographers of the transcontinental railroad. In 2001, he was awarded a PhD in Fine Arts from the University of Tasmania.

== Work ==
Stephenson moved to Australia in 1982 to take up a junior teaching position at the University of Tasmania School of Art, at the encouragement of Thomas Joshua Cooper, who had been teaching a summer school there. Agreeing to stay only for two years, in 1984 he was made a tenured faculty member and led the photography program at the school, along with later positions as postgraduate coordinator and research coordinator, until his retirement from teaching in 2013.

Stephenson has worked on many long-term overlapping projects in his pursuit of the photographic representation of the sublime in time and space, using a variety of medium format and large format cameras and film types, and more recently digital photography.

An exploration of the relationship of photography to time has been a recurrent theme in his work, both through the use of long exposures, and the compositing of sequential exposures. Art historian Helen Ennis remarks that; "Stephenson has tracked the movements of stars through the night sky in his 1995-6 series which reveals his self-declared commitment to an art of transcendence." His photographic series include New Monuments (1979-81), Composite Landscapes (1982-88), Clouds (1990-93), Vast (1990-91), The Ice (1991-92), Domes (1993-2005), Vaults (2003-09), Star Drawings (1995-2009), Drowned (2001-02), Marking Time (2003-05), Light Cities (2005-13), Time Slice (2014-22), and Survivors (2019-22).

== Publications ==
- Stars / photographs by David Stephenson; essay by Keith F. Davis, Julie Saul Gallery, New York, 1999.
- Skeletons / photographs by David Stephenson; essay by Greg French, Space and Light, Fern Tree, 2003. ISBN 0975039504
- Visions of Heaven: The Dome in European Architecture, Princeton Architectural Press, New York, 2005. ISBN 1-56898-549-5
- Heavenly Vaults: From Romanesque to Gothic in European Architecture, Princeton Architectural Press, New York, 2009. ISBN 978-1-56898-840-5

== Exhibitions ==
David Stephenson’s photographs have been presented in hundreds of group exhibitions and over sixty solo exhibitions including:

- 1983: Australian Perspecta 1983, Art Gallery of New South Wales, Sydney
- 1988: Australian Photography: the 1980's, Australian National Gallery, Canberra
- 1992: Location, Australian Centre for Contemporary Art, Melbourne
- 1993: David Stephenson: The Ice, Art Gallery of New South Wales, Sydney and Australian Centre for Contemporary Art, Melbourne
- 1994: Landed: Landscape Art in Australia, 1960-90, Australian National Gallery, Canberra
- 1994: An American Century of Photography: From Dry-Plate to Digital, Nelson-Atkins Museum of Art, Kansas City, and international tour
- 1998: Sublime Space: David Stephenson Photographs 1989-98, National Gallery of Victoria, Melbourne
- 1999: Tempus Fugit/Time Flies, Nelson-Atkins Museum of Art, Kansas City
- 2001: Space + Light: David Stephenson Photographs, 1982-1996, Tasmanian Museum and Art Gallery, Hobart
- 2001: Starlight: David Stephenson Photographs, Cleveland Museum of Art
- 2002: Fieldwork: Australian Art 1968-2002, National Gallery of Victoria, Melbourne
- 2006: Symétries sublimes, photographies de David Stephenson, Centre Culturel Calouste Gulbenkian, Paris
- 2007: Cross Currents: Focus on Contemporary Australian Art, Museum of Contemporary Art, Sydney
- 2010: In the Balance, Museum of Contemporary Art, Sydney
- 2011: Transcendence: Photographs by David Stephenson, Monash Gallery of Art, Melbourne
- 2011: Luminous World – Contemporary Art from the Wesfarmers Collection, Art Gallery of Western Australia, Perth
- 2013: Australia: land and landscape, Royal Academy of Arts, London; organised with National Gallery of Art, Canberra
- 2014 Perduti nel paesaggio/Lost in Landscape, Museo di Arte Moderna e Contemporanea di Trento e Rovereto, Italy
- 2015: The Photograph and Australia, Art Gallery of Art Gallery of New South Wales, Sydney
- 2017: David Stephenson: Human Landscapes, Art Gallery of New South Wales, Sydney
- 2018: Noorderlicht International Photofestival IN VIVO | the nature of nature, Museum Belvédère, Heerenveen, The Netherlands
- 2019: Civilization: The Way We Live Now, National Gallery of Victoria, Melbourne

== Collections ==
Stephenson’s photographs are held in many public collections, including:

- Ackland Art Museum
- Art Gallery of New South Wales
- Art Gallery of South Australia
- George Eastman Museum
- Library of Congress
- Metropolitan Museum of Art
- Monash Gallery of Art, Melbourne
- Museum of Contemporary Art Australia
- Museum of Fine Arts, Houston
- Museum of Modern Art
- National Gallery of Australia
- National Gallery of Victoria
- Nelson-Atkins Museum of Art
- Nevada Museum of Art
- Queensland Art Gallery & Gallery of Modern Art

== Awards ==
- 1980, National Endowment for the Arts Emerging Artist Fellowship
- 1992, 1996 Australia Council for the Arts Grants
- 2000, Australian Research Council Grant
- 2008-09, Australia Council for the Arts Fellowship
- 2014-17, Australian Research Council Discovery Project
- 2021, Hadley's Art Prize
