= Chervinsky =

Chervinsky, feminine: Chervinskaya, is a Russian-language surname. Notable people with the surname include:

- John Chervinsky (1961–2015), American photographer and particle accelerator engineer
- Lidiya Chervinskaya, Russian poetess
- Lindsay Chervinsky, American presidential historian
- Mikhail Chervinsky (1911–1965), Soviet screenwriter and poet
- Natalya Chervinskaya, Soviet animation filmmaker
- Roman Chervinsky (born 1974), Ukrainian military and counterintelligence officer
