= Beverley Shenstone =

Canadian aerodynamicist (1906–1979)

Beverley Strahan Shenstone
- Born: 10 June 1906; Toronto, Ontario, Canada
- Died: 9 November 1979 (aged 73)
- Spouse(s): Helen Home (1929–?); Doris Tint, née Harvey (1954–1979)
- Engineering career
- Discipline: Aerodynamics
- Projects: Vickers Supermarine Spitfire

Beverley Strahan Shenstone MASc, HonFRAes, FAIAA, AFIAS, FCAISI, HonOSTIV (10 June 1906 – 9 November 1979) was a Canadian aerodynamicist often credited with developing the aerodynamics of the Supermarine Spitfire elliptical wing. In his later career, he established the technical foundation of British commercial airline industry and promoted human-powered flight.

== Early life ==
Shenstone was born on 10 June 1906 in Toronto, Ontario. He was the eldest child of Saxon T. Shenstone and Kitty Alison (née Paterson), and the nephew of Allen Shenstone. His father died on Christmas Day 1915, leaving Beverley and his two younger brothers to be raised by Kitty and their paternal grandfather, Joseph Newton Shenstone. Beverley was taught by his uncles to sail. He designed, built and raced model yachts. As an undergraduate in 1927 he undertook a canoeing expedition throughout the waterways of South and South West England. At the end of this tour, he worked for few weeks in an Air Ministry laboratory located in the basement of the London Science Museum. He graduated from the University of Toronto in 1928 with a degree in engineering, which was followed by master's degree research into flying boat stability supervised by Professor John H. Parkin.

In June 1929, Shenstone learned to fly under an RCAF cadetship, going solo in under 10 hours which earned him a permanent RCAF commission. In an era when most aircraft were fabric-covered wooden biplanes, Shenstone realised that metal monoplanes were the future and that German industry was leading that field. He applied for a job with Dornier in Friedrichshafen but was unsuccessful. Perseverance and useful contacts paid off, with the assistance of Parkin and Captain M.C. Christie (the British Air Attache in Berlin) he got a position with Junkers in November 1929 at Dessau.

== Early career ==
He worked for a year at Junkers, learning metal-working techniques such as panel beating and riveting. He worked in technical departments such as the engine workshop. He also studied the all-wing theories of Hugo Junkers. Shenstone worked with Yoshihara Seiji on preparing the latter's Junkers Junior for its flight from Dessau to Tokyo in August 1930.

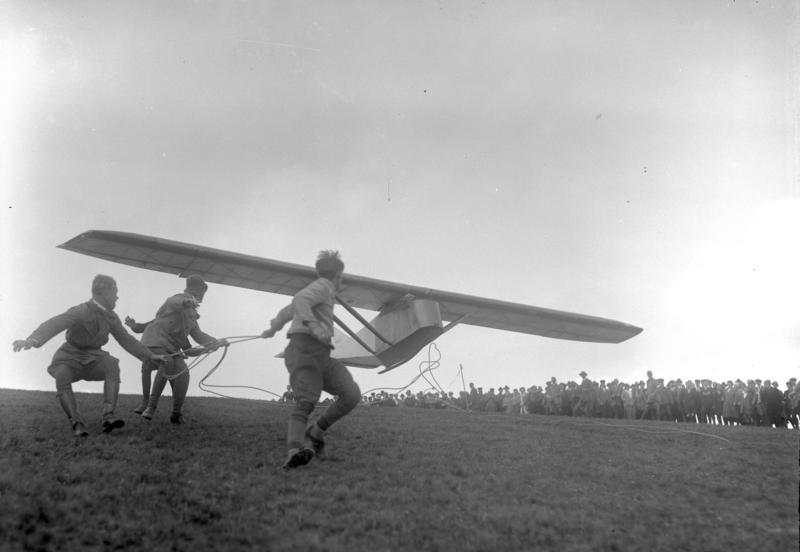
Glider launch at Wasserkuppe, August 1930, where Shenstone learnt to glide

In the summer of 1930, Shenstone learnt to glide at the Wasserkuppe. This was the premier gliding centre in Europe at the time. There he met Geoffrey Hill and Alexander Lippisch, both pioneers of all-wing aircraft. At this time Lippisch was leading the technical branch of the Rhön-Rossitten Gesellschaft. Shenstone spent the winter of 1930/1931 working with Lippish and his team developing tail-less gliders (and learning to ski). His friendship with Lippisch lasted for 40 years.

While in Germany, Shenstone travelled to Heidelberg and met Ludwig Prandtl, who was a pioneer in the application of systematic mathematical analyses to aerodynamics. It was also at the Wasserkuppe that he met Air Commodore John Adrian Chamier and acted as his translator. Chamier suggested that Shenstone should come to work for the British at Vickers-Armstrongs of which Chamier was a director.

To find work, he moved to England in May 1931. Geoffrey Hill tried to get him a job at Westland but there was nothing suitable. He was interviewed by Sidney Camm but due to a misunderstanding walked out of the interview. Through Chamier he got an interview in 1932 with Reginald Mitchell at Supermarine (which was part of Vickers-Armstrong). While disappointed with Shenstone's knowledge of monoplane-wing construction, Mitchell was impressed by his expertise in aerodynamic theory and gave him a full-time position at £500 per annum following a two-month trial.

== Spitfire ==
As well as providing technical support, Mitchell charged Shenstone with bringing an external perspective to Supermarine's designs. As a result, Shenstone travelled with Ernest Hives of Rolls-Royce to Germany in early 1934 and later that year to the US where he visited NACA and a number of aircraft manufacturers. As a result, he reported back to Mitchell on the latest NACA wing profiles and the importance being placed on a high level of aerodynamic finish by other designers.

Even before his Type 224 design was rejected by the Air Ministry, Mitchell had decided to commence a thorough reworking of the design, in particular the wing design. Assisted by Shenstone's expertise in theoretical aerodynamics Mitchell with additional input from Ernest Mansbridge, Joe Smith and Alfred Faddy began to investigate using an elliptical wing. Both Mitchell and Shenstone were aware of the potential of an elliptical wing as Mitchell had proposed it for his Type 179 flying boat, while the Short Crusader seaplane which had been an entry for the 1927 Schneider Trophy had a similar lobe-form wing. Meanwhile, Shenstone was aware that Frederick Lanchester had suggested in 1907 that it was better to spread the vortex flow along the wing instead of concentrating it at the tip, while Max Munk had also identified that when a wing has an elliptically distributed lift then induced drag will be reduced.

Continued iteration led the Supermarine designers to create a distorted elliptical wing with the wing tip pushed forward to produce more lift. With its main spar at right angles the result was a rigid stable wing that provided the stability needed for an aircraft with wing mounted guns. The new wing design was incorporated in the Type 300 proposal that eventually became the Spitfire.

== Later projects at Supermarine ==
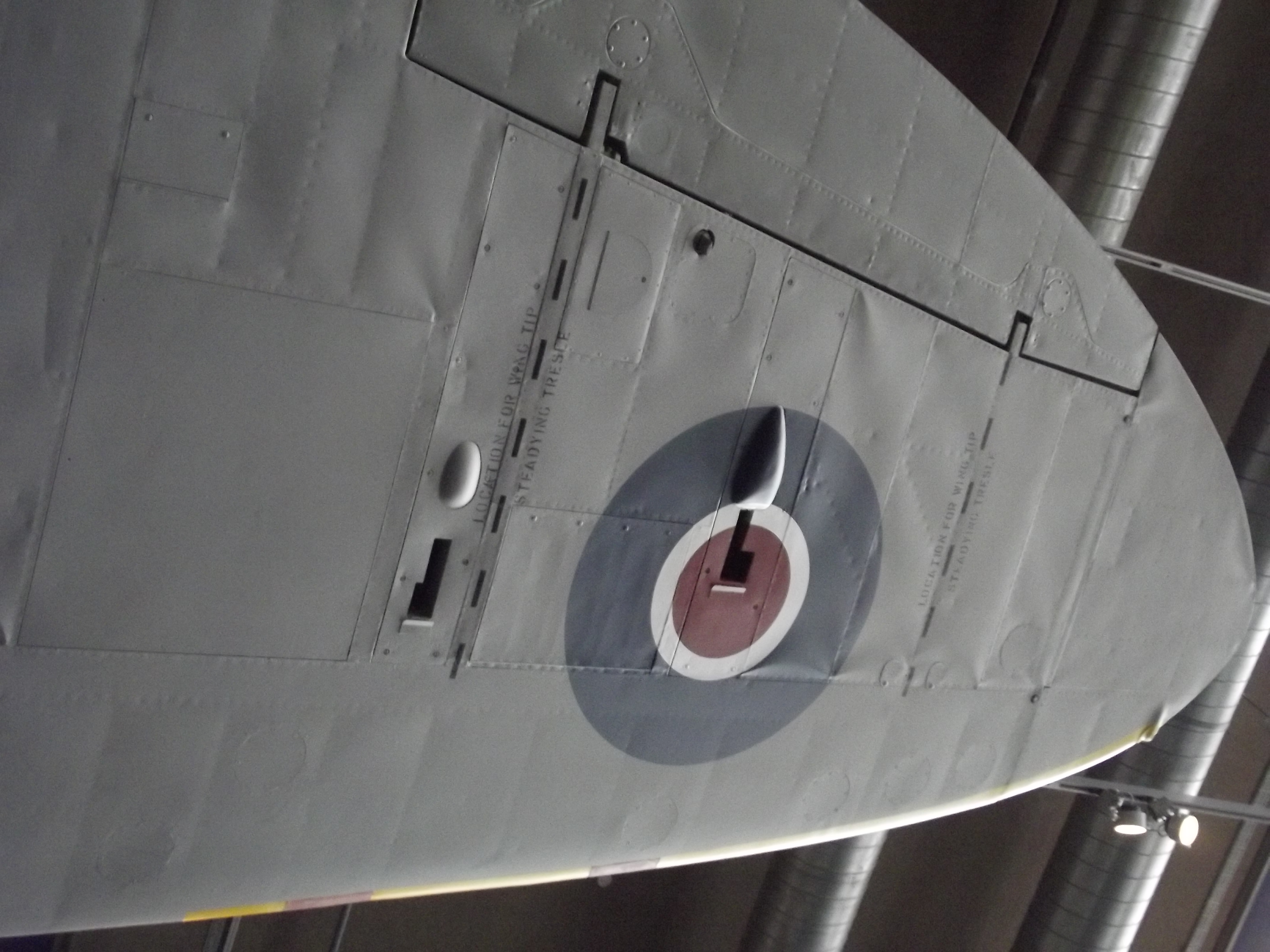
Spitfire elliptical wing at Thinktank, Birmingham Science Museum

After his work on the Spitfire, Shenstone was chief aerodynamicist on the Supermarine B.12/36 proposal. This specification was for a four-engined heavy bomber, and the Supermarine proposal used a wing with a highly swept leading edge, storing the bomb load in both the wing and fuselage. While Supermarine were given a development contract for two prototypes, after the first was destroyed in a bombing raid in September 1940 this specification was fulfilled by the Short Stirling which had been the Air Ministry's backup due to their doubts about Supermarine.

== Air Ministry ==
In 1938, Shenstone left Supermarine and went to work for the Air Ministry as a senior scientific officer for the director of civil aviation. There he had a role encouraging cooperation and efficiency within the industry. In October 1940, he was sent to the US as part of the British Air Commission working to ensure that American lend-lease aircraft were matched to the requirements of the RAF. In this role he was to take an interest in the development of the P-51 Mustang.

Despite his early research, in 1943, after a difficult experience crossing the Atlantic in a flying boat, Shenstone became convinced that they would be outmoded in post war aviation. This was not a popular position for a member of the Brabazon Committee and drew criticism from other members.

== Return to Canada ==
Shenstone moved back to Canada in 1946 where he was technical administrator for Trans-Canada Airlines. He then moved to Avro Canada in Toronto, where he was involved in technical management aspects of the new Avro Jetliner and CF-100 jet fighter, but was disappointed by the lack of development work that would fully utilise his experience. This prompted him to write to N.E Rowe (who was now director of research and development with BEA) to enquire about the possible positions. As a result, he was given the post of chief engineer in 1948.

At BEA he instigated a system of statistical maintenance control, using past component failures to direct future maintenance. More significantly, he made important contributions to the specifications of British civil aircraft. For instance, he was instrumental in increasing the passenger capacity of the Vickers Viscount. In the late 1950s he was key in developing the tail engine configuration of the de Havilland D.H.121 (later to become the Trident) and the VC10. Shenstone also introduced BEA's first jet services, starting with the de Havilland Comet in 1960. In that year he was also appointed to the board of directors of BEA. He was president of the RAeS from May 1962 to May 1963.

== Later career ==
In late 1964, he was appointed technical director of BOAC where he was responsible for co-ordinating the work of BOAC's engineering and flight operations. In this capacity he was principally concerned with long-term projects, particularly supersonic airliners. He had been involved with the development of supersonic passenger aircraft from the beginning. A Supersonic Transport Advisory Committee had been formed in 1956 to make recommendations, and he had represented BEA on the technical sub-committee. Later, speaking at a RAeS discussion on "The Difficulties and Advantages of Supersonic Civil Transport" in March 1965, he expressed his scepticism of the profitability of supersonic transport (SST). He described it as "the largest, most expensive and most dubious project ever undertaken in the development of civil aircraft" stating that, "the greatest doubt lies in the improbability that the SST will be able to be profitable."

He maintained an interest in gliding. He worked with Waclaw Czerwiński in the late 1940s to design the Czerwiński-Shenstone Loudon and Harbinger and was a founder member of Project Sigma; an attempt to develop a high-performance sailplane aimed at winning the open class of the 1969 World Gliding Championships.

In 1955, Shenstone published articles that concluded that man powered flight was possible but fundamental data was lacking. He suggested that if resources were put into the field, a successful machine would be possible. He presented a paper "The problem of the very light weight highly-efficient aeroplane" in the conference of the Low Speed Aerodynamics Research Association. In January 1957, Shenstone, and six other enthusiasts (including Terence Nonweiler) met in Cranfield in and formed the Man-Powered Aircraft Committee (later to become the Man-Powered Aircraft Group of the RAeS) with the purposes of reviewing relevant literature, assessing its prospects, and promoting its realisation.

He retired at the end of 1966 and moved to Cyprus where he had the part-time role as technical advisor for Cyprus Airways. He remained in Cyprus until his death in November 1979.

== Awards and honours ==
In 1982, Shenstone was inducted into the Engineering Hall of Distinction of the University of Toronto. In 2016, he was named to the Canada's Aviation Hall of Fame.

== Personal life ==
Shenstone was married to Helen Marguerite Home (1929–?).

== Sources ==
- Ackroyd, John A.D. "The Aerodynamics of the Spitfire" (PDF). Journal of Aeronautical History (Paper No. 2016/03): 59–86".
- Ackroyd, John A.D. (2013). "The Spitfire Wing Planform: A Suggestion" (PDF). Journal of Aeronautical History (Paper No. 2013/02): 121–135.
- Beaver, Paul (2015). Spitfire People : The men and women who made the Spitfire the aviation icon. Sherborne, Dorset: Evro Publishing. ISBN 978-1-9105050-5-2.
- Cole, Lance (2012). Secrets of the Spitfire. The story of Beverley Shenstone the man who perfected the elliptical wing. Pen and Sword Books. ISBN 978-1-84884-896-2.
- Leo, McKinstry (2007). Spitfire – Portrait of a Legend. London: John Murray. ISBN 978-0-7195-6875-6.
- Pegram, Ralph (2016). Beyond the Spitfire – The Unseen Designs of R.J. Mitchell. Brimscombe Port: The History Press. ISBN 978-0-7509-6515-6.
- Reay, D.A (1977). The History of Man-Powered Flight. Pergammon. p. 136. ISBN 978-1483113579.
- Robertson, Bruce (1987). British Military Aircraft Serials 1878–1987. Leicester, England: Midland Counties Publications. ISBN 0-904597-61-X.
- Shenstone, B. S. (18 November 1955). "Man-Powered Flight: A Stimulating Review" (PDF). Flight: 778–779.
- "Ontario Births, 1869–1910: Beverley Strahan Shenstone, 1906"". FamilySearch.
- "Here and There". Flight: 377. 8 April 1948.
- "Reducing operating costs, BEA introduce new maintenance check system". Flight: 215. 24 February 1949.
- "As British as Queen Victoria, AIRSCAPE MAG". 15 March 2017.
- "Air Commerce... Shenstone for BOAC" (PDF). Flight International: 776. 5 November 1964.
- "Facing Sst Facts". Flight International: 442. 25 March 1965.
- "Reluctant Supersonics". Flight International: 473. 1 April 1965.
- "Society Worthies". Flight International: 70–71. 13 January 1966.
- "British Group Plans World-beating Sailplane". Flight International: 512. 31 March 1966.
- "Sensor". Flight International: 167. 2 February 1966.
- "Air Transport... Cyprus Appointments". Flight International. 9 October 1969.
- "Unique contribution to air transport". Flight International: 2016. 15 December 1979. Archived from the original on 4 March 2016.
- "Beverley Shenstone". The Flyer Canada's Aviation Hall of Fame. 34 (2): 5. May 2016.
- "Profile B.S Shenstone The missionary of muscle powered flight". New Scientist: 789–790. 9 April 1959.
- "Engineering Hall of Distinction of the University of Toronto: Shenstone, Beverley Strahan".

Professional and academic associations
Preceded by Air Marshal Sir Owen Jones	President of the Royal Aeronautical Society; 1962-1963	Succeeded by Prof Arthur Roderick Collar
