= Matt Magee =

American contemporary artist

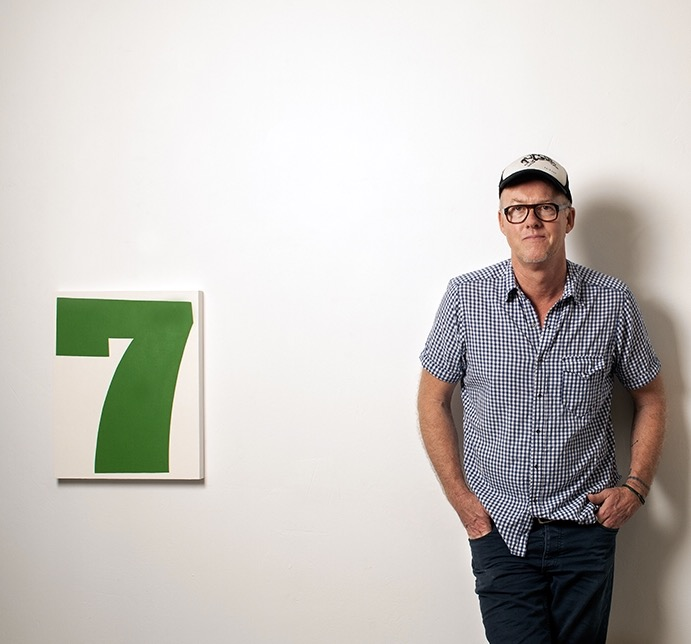
Matt Magee with painting entitled "Green ABQ7"

Matt Magee is an American contemporary artist who is best known for his minimal abstract geometric paintings, sculptures, prints, assemblages, murals and photographs.

== Biography ==
He was born in Paris, France in 1961 and moved from there to Tripoli, Libya and then to London. He moved to Brooklyn in 1984 to attend Pratt Institute for an MFA after completing a BA in Art History at Trinity University in San Antonio, TX. He maintained a studio on New York City until 2012 and currently lives in Phoenix, AZ.

Magee's father, a geologist and archaeologist, took him on trips through the Southwest where he collected small objects along the way that later informed his art practices. As a young adult he worked on a seismic truck in Laredo, TX and recorded vibrations sent into the earth to determine underlying geologic formations. Later, Magee was the chief photo archivist for the Robert Rauschenberg Foundation. Throughout his life, he has established ways of collecting that now inform his compositions.

Magee's painting style is minimal in concept, but his brushstrokes are expressive. Within these conceptual spreadsheets, abacuses, and hieroglyphics are reminders of the artist's hand. His visual language relates to early hard-edge abstraction and finds inspiration in contemporary scientific, ecological, and technological ideas.

Magee has experimented with abstract and conceptual art practices. Magee's compositions are organizations of shapes that have been informed by personal history, numerology, and language. Re-purposing a variety of found and collected media characterizes his sculpture and collage while his paintings explore language symbolically with an emphasis on repetition and reiteration and nods to art historical precedents.

He is represented by Richard Levy Gallery in Albuquerque, NM; Hiram Butler Gallery in Houston, TX; Eagle Gallery in London; Inde/Jacobs Gallery in Marfa, TX; David Hall Fine Art in Wellesley, MA; and Mission Projects in Chicago.

Magee was the 2017 Arlene and Mort Scult Award winner, the 2007 Josef and Anni Albers Foundation resident fellow, and winner of the Board of Trustees Award from the Silvermine Arts Center. He was also a 1991 Pollock-Krasner Foundation Grant recipient. His work has been exhibited worldwide.

== Selected solo exhibitions ==
- 2018 Matt Magee, Scult Award Exhibition, Phoenix Art Museum
- 2017 Matt Magee: formUlate, David Hall Fine Art, Wellesley, MA
- Wall of Text, Everybody Gallery, Tucson, AZ
- Matt Magee Photographs 1981-2016, Shortcut Gallery, Phoenix, AZ
- Glen Hanson and Matt Magee Recent Work, Indie/Jacobs, Marfa, TX
- Signs: The Photographs of Matt Magee, Darren Winston Bookseller, Sharon, CT
- 2016 Matt Magee: On Language and Marking Time, Eagle Gallery, London, UK
- Seven: A Survey of Paintings by Matt Magee, Richard Levy Gallery, Albuquerque, NM
- Materiality, The Mission, Chicago, IL
- How the West Was Won, Darren Winston Bookseller, Sharon, CT
- Prima Materia, Hiram Butler Gallery, Houston, TX
- Memory and Reflection, site specific mural, Tucson Museum of Art, Tucson, AZ
- Wall Grapheme 1, site specific mural, Tamarind Institute, Albuquerque, NM
- Grapheme 3, site specific mural, ArtEXPO, Chicago, IL
- 2015 Matt Magee Marfa, Inde/Jacobs, Marfa, TX
- Paintings & Textcavations: new work by Matt Magee, John Molloy Gallery, New York, NY
- 2014 Matt Magee: Recent Paintings and Sculptures, James Kelly Contemporary, Santa Fe, NM
- 2013 Circa 1994, Hiram Butler Gallery, Houston, TX
- 2011 Paintings, Hiram Butler Gallery, Houston, TX
- 2010 Knoedler Project Space, New York, NY
- 2009 Ideograms, Devin Borden Hiram Butler Gallery, Houston, TX
- 2008 Thought Forms, Eight Modern, Santa Fe, NM
- Heskin Contemporary, New York, NY
- 2007 River Gallery, Narrowsburg, New York, NY
- 2000 Bill Maynes Gallery, New York, NY
- 1997 Bill Maynes Gallery, New York, NY
- 1995 Gerald Peters Gallery, Dallas, TX
- 1990 Berland Hall Gallery, New York, NY

== Awards ==
Awards

- 2017 Arlene and Mort Scult Award, Phoenix Art Museum, Phoenix, AZ
- 2016 Tamarind Institute Residency, Albuquerque, NM
- 2015 Josef and Anni Albers Foundation Residency, Bethany, CT
- 2013 Tamarind Institute Residency, Albuquerque, NM
- 2007 The Photo Review Competition issue, juried by Toby Jurovics
- 2007 Josef and Anni Albers Foundation Residency, Bethany, CT
- 2006 Board of Trustees Award, Silvermine Arts Center, New Canaan, CT
- 2002 New York Foundation for the Arts painting grant
- 1991 Pollock-Krasner Foundation painting grant
- 1985 Atlantic Center for the Arts residency with artist James Surls, Florida

== Selected public collections ==
- Andaz Scottsdale Resort and Spa, Hyatt Hotels Corporation, Scottsdale, AZ
- Josef and Anni Albers Foundation, Bethany, CT
- Albuquerque Museum of Art and History, Albuquerque, NM
- Anadarko Petroleum Corp., Houston, TX
- Capital One Financial Services, VA
- Cleveland Clinic Art Program, Cleveland, OH
- Christophe de Menil, New York, NY
- Columbus Museum of Art, Columbus, GA
- Genentech, San Francisco, CA
- Goldman Sachs, New York, NY
- John Kidd and Associates, Houston, TX
- Linklaters LLC, Brussels, Belgium
- Museum of Fine Arts, Houston, TX
- Robert Rauschenberg Foundation, New York, NY
- Steptoe & Johnson LLP, Menlo Park, CA
- Twitter Inc., San Francisco, CA
- University of New Mexico Art Museum, Albuquerque, NM
