= Czerwinski-Shenstone UTG-1 Loudon =

Single seat Canadian glider, 1949

UTG-1 Loudon

General information
- Type: Intermewdiate Glider
- National origin: Canada
- Manufacturer: University of Toronto
- Designer: Wacław Czerwiński & Beverley S. Shenstone
- Number built: 1

History
- First flight: 5 November 1949

The UTG-1 Loudon was an intermediate glider designed and built at the University of Toronto in Canada during the late 1940s.

== Design and development ==
By 1947 Canadian glider pilots urgently needed a new intermediate performance glider for club use and cross-country flying. Concurrently the Loudon Professor of Civil Engineering at the University of Toronto proposed that his 4th year students gain experience by building a glider. Waclaw Czerwinski and Beverley S. Shenstone designed a small glider for the students to build, which was completed within two years and flown for the first time on 5 November 1949.

Construction of the Loudon was primarily of wood with fabric and plywood skinning, following contemporary standard practice of a shoulder set two piece wing immediately aft of the enclosed cockpit. The fuselage was built up from spruce frames and stringers with plywood covering incorporating the integral fin. The wing consisted of a single cantilever spar with a ply sandwich leading edge torque tube. Made up ribs forming the wing section aft of the spar and all control surface, were fabric covered.

Controls were entirely conventional with ailerons near the wing-tips, tailplane with elevators at the base of the fin and a rudder hinged from the rear of the fin.

Support on the ground consisted of a large nose skid under the nose extending from the nose back to a semi-recessed mainwheel, aft of the centre of gravity a steel sprung tailskid at the base of the fin and re-inforced wingtips.

Flight testing of the Loudon was successful and an experimental type certificate was issued by the Canadian Department of Transport in November 1952, receiving the registration CF-ZBN-X.

== Operational history ==
The Loudon was used for several years before an accident wrote the aircraft off.

== Specifications (UTG-1 Loudon) ==
Data from Shenstone

General characteristics

- Crew: 1
- Length: 19 ft 8 in (6 m)
- Wingspan: 45 ft 0 in (13.72 m)
- Wing area: 174.9 sq ft (16.25 m^{2})
- Aspect ratio: 11.6
- Airfoil: root NACA 4416, mid NACA 4416, tip NACA 6412,
- Empty weight: 331 lb (150 kg)
- Gross weight: 564 lb (256 kg)

Performance

- Stall speed: 25.0 mph (40.2 km/h, 21.7 kn)
- Never exceed speed: 90 mph (145 km/h, 78 kn)
- Rough air speed max: 145 km/h (90.1 mph; 78.3 kn)
- Aerotow speed: 145 km/h (90.1 mph; 78.3 kn)
- Winch launch speed: 105 km/h (65.2 mph; 56.7 kn)
- g limits: +5.08 -3.08
- Maximum glide ratio: 22 at 66 km/h (41.0 mph; 35.6 kn)
- Rate of sink: 146 ft/min (0.74 m/s) at 46.7 km/h (29.0 mph; 25.2 kn)
- Wing loading: 3.2 lb/sq ft (15.8 kg/m^{2})

== See also ==
Aircraft of comparable role, configuration, and era

- Schleicher Ka 8
- Slingsby Skylark 2
