= Eric Tillinghast =

American contemporary artist

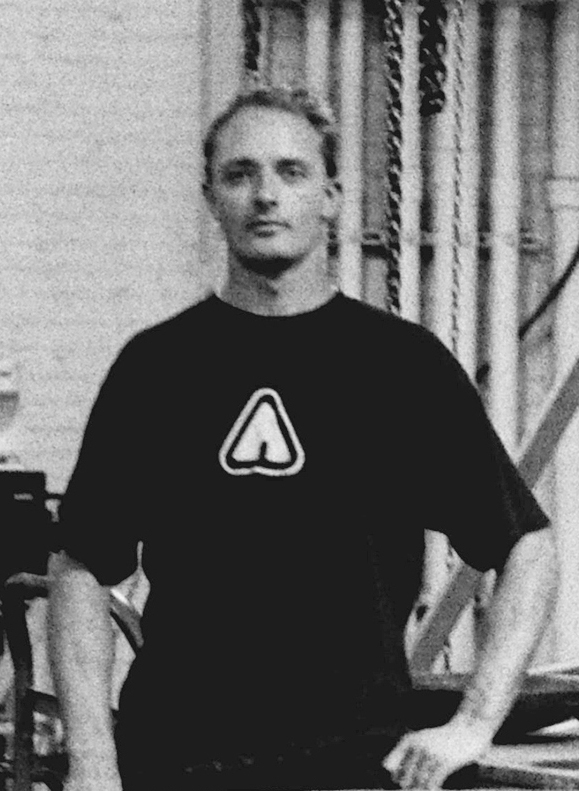
Eric Tillinghast

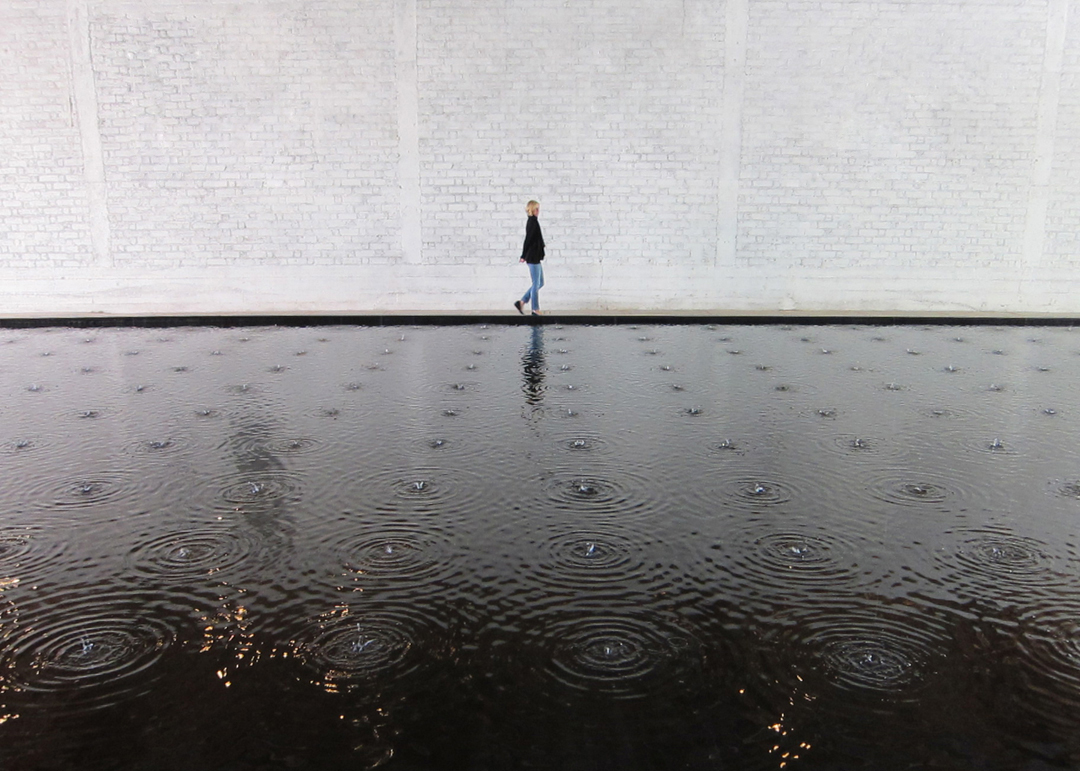
Eric Tillinghast, Rain Machine, 2010, water, rubber, Pump and Drip System, 15' x 33' x 81', Installation for the Center for Contemporary Art, Santa Fe, NM

Eric Tillinghast is an American contemporary artist based in Los Angeles. He has worked with water as a sculptural material since 1994. After attending art school in Sweden, Tillinghast began his art career in California where he created charcoal drawings. These drawings became increasingly minimal and geometric. The carefully developed detail seen in these earliest works carries over to the precision and attention to detail seen in his metal works. His works can be found in the permanent collections of the Albright-Knox Gallery, the John Michael Kohler Art Center in Wisconsin, the Museum of Fine Art in Santa Fe, Portland State University, and the Scottsdale Museum of Contemporary Art in Arizona.

== Background ==
Tillinghast began making geometric box-like constructions that initially appeared as singular objects but later incorporated water. His focus was no longer just with space and line, but also light and liquid. This has resulted in an ongoing series of sculptures, installations, paintings, and projects in which water is the primary subject and medium. Tillinghast has created site specific fountains, wishing wells, and rain machines that explore the social, civic, and pedestrian relationships that people and communities have with water. His work also explores the history every culture has around the meaning of water. His small paintings on paper created with found vintage postcards of various bodies of water embody post-modernist deconstruction, found-object art, vernacular photography, and minimalism.

Tillinghast has created two fountain installations for the Life is Beautiful Festival in Las Vegas. His work has been exhibited at The Galerie der Stadt Mainz Bruckenturm in Mainz, Rocket in London, P.S. in Amsterdam, and The Center For Contemporary Non-Objective Art in Brussels. His work can be found in the permanent collections of the Albright-Knox Gallery, the John Michael Kohler Art Center in Wisconsin, the Museum of Fine Art in Santa Fe, Portland State University, and the Scottsdale Museum of Contemporary Art in Arizona among others.
