= Stephanie Buhmann =

German art critic and art historian (born 1977)

- Born: 1977 (age 48–49); Hamburg, Germany
- Education: Moore College of Art and Design; Pratt Institute (MFA); Humboldt University of Berlin (PhD)
- Known for: Art critic, art historian, and curator

Stephanie Buhmann is a German-American art historian and curator. Born in Hamburg, Germany, she is based in New York City and Lübeck, Germany.

== Career ==
In addition to curating dozens of exhibitions, Buhmann has written extensively on modern and contemporary art. Her essays and reviews have been published in international art magazines, exhibition catalogues, and newspapers since 2003. She has conducted over ninety interviews with artists and curated exhibitions in Europe and the United States. Since 2023, she has served as Head of the Department of Art, Architecture, and Design at the Austrian Cultural Forum New York.

== Education ==
Buhmann earned a Ph.D. from Humboldt University of Berlin in 2021 and a Master's degree in the History of Art and Design from Pratt Institute in New York.

== Studio Conversations ==
Buhmann is the author of the book series Studio Conversations, which focuses on contemporary women artists in different cities. Each volume is dedicated to a specific location. She initiated the project in 2012 in response to an increasing emphasis on the art market in media coverage. The series documents conversations with artists in their studios, focusing on their work and creative processes. She has released five books thus far: "New York Studio Conversations; Seventeen Women Talk About Art" (2016), "Berlin Studio Conversations - Twenty Women Talk About Art" (2017), New York Studio Conversations (Part II) (2018), and Rheinland Studio Conversations (2021). All of these were published by The Green Box, Berlin. Artists include Katharina Grosse, Julie Mehretu, Shirin Neshat, Carolee Schneemann, Kiki Smith and more than eighty others.

== Writing ==
Buhmann's essays and art reviews have been published by a variety of international art magazines and newspapers, including Kunst Bulletin, Sculpture Magazine, The Brooklyn Rail, ARTPulse, Art on Paper, Art Papers, Art Collector, Chelsea Now and Art Lies. She has contributed essays to various monographs, including publications by Hatje Cantz and Birkhäuser, and she is a contributing editor at artcritical.

== Curating ==
In addition to being an art critic and writer, Buhmann has curated many exhibitions, including at the Shirley Fiterman Art Center at the Borough of Manhattan Community College, New York, the Macy Art Gallery, Teacher's College, Columbia University and Jason McCoy gallery. Artists she has exhibited include, Lee Krasner, Frederick Kiesler, Thomas Nozkowski, Willy Bo Richardson, Jackson Pollock, and Richard Pousette-Dart.

== Selected exhibitions ==
- Vally Wieselthier: Sculpting Modernism, Austrian Cultural Forum, New York, 2025/26
- Ernst Caramelle. two dots one line, Austrian Cultural Forum New York, 2025
- Across Time. Form and Space. Judith P. Fischer and Uwe Hauenfels, Austrian Cultural Forum New York, 2024/25
- Frederick Kiesler: Us, You, Me, Co-Curated with Dr. Matthias Haldemann and Gerd Zillner, Kunsthaus Zug, Switzerland
- Margarete Schüte-Lihotzky. Pioneering Architect. Visionary Activist. Co-Curated with Dr. Bernadette Reinhold, Austrian Cultural Forum New York
- What Should I Be Afraid of? Roma Artist Ceija Stojka. Co-Curated with Dr. Lorely French and Carina Kurta, Austrian Cultural Forum New York

== Symposia ==
Buhmann has organized many panel discussions, including at CUNY Graduate Center, New York; the Austrian Cultural Forum New York; the Museum of Contemporary Art in Los Angeles; Teacher's College, Columbia University, New York, and the Shirley Fiterman Art Gallery at the Borough of Manhattan Community College, New York.

== Teaching ==
Her teaching experience includes lectures at the Rhode Island School of Design, Providence, RI; Pratt Institute, New York; Hofstra University, New York; Wave Hill, New York, and the Beaverbrook Art Gallery, New Brunswick, Canada, among others.

== Selected publications ==
=== Books ===
- Ernst Caramelle. two dots one line. Berlin: The Green Box, 2025. ISBN 978-3-96216-023-4
- Across Time. Form and Space. Judith P. Fischer and Uwe Hauenfels. Berlin: The Green Box, 2025. ISBN 978-3-96216-022-7
- Frederick Kiesler: Galaxies. Berlin: The Green Box, 2022, ISBN 978-3-96216-016-6
- Rheinland Studio Conversations; Fifteen Women Talk About Art. Berlin: The Green Box, 2021, ISBN 978-3-96216-012-8
- Los Angeles Studio Conversations; Sixteen Women Talk About Art. Berlin: The Green Box, 2019, ISBN 978-3-941644-05-2
- New York Studio Conversations (Part II); Twenty-One Women Talk About Art. Berlin: The Green Box, 2018, ISBN 978-3-941644-03-8
- Berlin Studio Conversations; Twenty Women Talk About Art. Berlin: The Green Box, 2017, ISBN 978-3-941644-93-9
- New York Studio Conversations; Seventeen Women Talk About Art. Berlin: The Green Box, 2016, ISBN 978-3-941644-83-0

=== Anthologies and monographs ===
- Christiane Löhr: In Dialogue with Space, in: Christiane Löhr, Berlin: Hatje Cantz, 2020
- Ulrike Rosenbach; An Interview, Galerie Gisela Clement, Bonn, 2020
- Frederick Kiesler and Jean Arp, in: Frederick Kiesler: Face to Face with the Avant-Garde, Basel: Birkhäuser 2019
- Yun Gee and Li-lan: Art Without Borders, Tina Kim Gallery, Hong-Kong, 2017
- Across the Atlantic; The Friendship of Jean Arp and Frederick Kiesler, in: Hans Arp and the United States, Stiftung Arp, Berlin, 2016
- Nicole Schmölzer: The Independence of Abstraction, Kunstverein Reutlingen, Germany: Modo Verlag, 2013
- Jack Tworkov: Between the Subjective and the Universal, Birmingham, Michigan: David Klein Gallery, 2013
- Jackson Pollock: Signs & Symbols Allover, New York: Jason McCoy Gallery, November 2012
- Charles Pollock: The Chapala Series 1955–1956', New York: Jason McCoy, Inc., 2007

=== Selected articles ===
- "The Studio Museum in Harlem," Monopol, February 2026.
- "Helene Schjerfbeck in New York: Blick in die Tiefe," Monopol, December 2025.
- "Calder Gardens in Philadelphia," Monopol, September 2025.
- "Thoughts on Caspar David Friedrich," Monopol, March 2025.
- "Vital Signs: Artists and the Body," Monopol, February 2025.
- "Thoughts on Paula Modersohn-Becker," The Brooklyn Rail, November 2024.
- "Lucio Fontana's Third Dimension," Hyperallergic, January 12, 2023.
- Behind the Scenes: A Conversation with Mark Dion, Sculpture Magazine, 2016
- Painting For The Experience: Frank Stella at the Whitney Museum, CHELSEA NOW and AM New York, November 18, 2015
- Constantino Nivola, in: Sculpture Magazine, May 2013
- Wilhelm Lehmbruck, in: Sculpture Magazine, December 2012
- Dan Flavin's Drawings at the Morgan Library, on: Artcritical, June 2012
- Constantin Brâncuși and Richard Serra, in: Sculpture Magazine, December 2011
- The Work of Stephen Mueller (1947–2011), in: The Brooklyn Rail, November 2011
- Betye Saar]], in: Sculpture Magazine, October 2011
- Kathleen Kucka's Ultrastructures, New York: Brenda Taylor Gallery, September 2011
- Franz Xaver Messerschmidt [1736-1783] at Neue Galerie New York, in: Sculpture Magazine, July/August 2011
- Eva Hesse and Sol LeWitt at Craig F. Starr Gallery, in: Brooklyn Rail, May 2011
- Jackson Pollock Family Letters - Book Review, in: The Brooklyn Rail, April 2011
- Malcah Zeldis: A Life Traveled in Painting, in: Chelsea Now, February 10, 2011
- On Becoming an Artist: Isamu Noguchi and His Contemporaries, 1922–1960, in: The Brooklyn Rail, February 2011
- Anselm Kiefer: Next Year in Jerusalem, in: The Brooklyn Rail, December/January 2011
- Julie Mehretu at The Guggenheim, in: The Brooklyn Rail, July/August 2010
- Gerhard Richter at Marian Goodman Gallery, artcritical, January 2010
- Mark Bradford and Kara Walker at Sikkema Jenkins & Co., in: Artcritical.com, October 2009
- Alice Neel at David Zwirner and Zwirner & Wirth, in: Artcritical.com, August 2009
- Nick Cave: Soundsuits, in: Sculpture Magazine, July/August 2009, Vol. 28, No. 6
- Patti Smith: Veil; A glimpse into Smith's work outside of Music, in: Chelsea now, Vol. 3, No. 18, March 27-April 9, 2009
- Alfred Kubin, in: The Brooklyn Rail, December 2008
- David Byrne; Finding the Voice of the Battery Maritime, in: The Villager, Vol. 78 / Number 8, July 23 – 29, 2008
- Olafur Eliasson at MoMA, PS1 and the East River, artcritical, June 2008
- Ursula von Rydingsvard at the Portland Museum of Art, Oregon, in: Art Papers, March/April 2007
- Lee Bontecou, in: The Brooklyn Rail, April 2007
- Caspar David Friedrich at the Hamburger Kunsthalle, in: The Brooklyn Rail, February 2007
- Louise Bourgeois, in: The Brooklyn Rail, November 2006
- Dieter Roth; A Retrospective, in: The Brooklyn Rail, April 2004
- In Conversation; An interview with Nancy Spero, in: The Brooklyn Rail, November 2003

== Quote ==
In 2019, when asked by Deanna Sirlin, founder of The Art Section, an online journal of art and cultural commentary, whether her perspective on an artist's work would change after an interview, Buhmann replied:

"I believe that your perspective on something always changes when you learn more about it. A deeper understanding will always add another, more interesting layer. That's why education is so important to everything we do or want to have a say in. In general, I will walk away with even more respect and admiration for the work I saw."
