= Sergiuz Czerwiński glider =

Czerwinski (1927) glider

General information
- Type: Basic glider
- National origin: Poland
- Designer: Sergiuz Czerwinski
- Number built: 1

History
- First flight: 1927

The Czerwinski (1927) glider was a simple, open frame, monoplane glider built in Poland to spread enthusiasm for aviation.

== Design and development ==
Sergiuz Czerwiński, no relation of the better known glider designer Wacław Czerwiński, had designed, built and flown his first glider, a biplane, in 1917. In 1927 he, like several other Polish aircraft enthusiasts, saw that gliding offered a cheap route to flying for the young and produced a suitable aircraft, developed in an aeromodelling group he formed at the Słowacki school in Kowel.

The 1927 Czerwiński monoplane glider had a rectangular plan, two part wing, built around a single spar and fabric covered. Instead of conventional ailerons and elevators, the pilot was able to alter the angle of incidence of each half-wing separately. This control system, used by several Polish gliders between about 1924 and 1927, was underpinned by the idea that gliders could obtain lift by capturing the energy of gusts, the pilot increasing the angle of incidence of the whole wing as soon as the upward motion of the glider indicated a horizontal gust. Differential incidence movement controlled roll, like ailerons, and collective operation controlled pitch, removing the need for an elevator.

The Czerwińsk had an open frame fuselage, a flat truss built from ash with I-form chords and cross-members. The pilot sat on the lower chord behind the first cross-member. At the rear the empennage was fabric covered, with a tailplane without elevators and a conventional fin and rudder.

Czerwiński made some dozen successful flights in the Kowel area but felt limited by the generally flat terrain there and presented his glider to ZASPL, the aviation students association of Lviv Polytechnic, who seem to have made no use of it.

== Specifications ==
Data from samoloitypl

General characteristics

- Crew: One
- Length: 6.5 m (21 ft 4 in)
- Wingspan: 13 m (42 ft 8 in)
- Wing area: 22 m^{2} (240 sq ft)
- Aspect ratio: 7.7
- Empty weight: 80 kg (176 lb)
- Gross weight: 150 kg (331 lb)

Performance

- Maximum glide ratio: 11
- Rate of sink: 1.2–1 m/s (240–200 ft/min)
