= Kathleen Kucka =

American painter (b. 1962)

- Born: 1962 (age 63–64); East Hartford, Connecticut, U.S.
- Education: Cooper Union (BFA); Hunter College (MFA)
- Known for: Painting, drawing
- Website: kathleenkucka.com

Kathleen Kucka, Hot Plate Burn and Iron Burn paintings, burns on canvas, 85" x 75", 1993, exhibition at PS 122 Gallery, New York City.

Kathleen Kucka (born 1962) is an American visual artist whose practice includes abstract paintings, works on paper and prints. She is known for work that combines a conceptual approach with unique, sometimes unpredictable processes of mark-making such as the burning of canvas, pouring paint, and sewing. Critics note her work for its highly associative, open-ended quality, which evokes modernist formalism and natural phenomena from the microcosmic to the macrocosmic. Critic Stephanie Buhmann wrote that Kucka's work is inspired by nature and contemporary abstraction with attention to geometry, and leaves viewers "wondering if we are witnessing a scene documented through a microscope or captured from an aerial view ... we find ourselves reminded of the interrelations between all things, be they of a natural or man-made origin."

Kucka has exhibited at the Brooklyn Museum, Columbia Museum of Art, Norton Museum of Art and the Drawing Center, among other venues. Her work belongs to permanent art collections including those of the Birmingham Museum of Art, Borusan Contemporary (Turkey), and Weatherspoon Art Museum. She lives in New York City and Falls Village, Connecticut.

== Education and career ==
Kucka was born in 1962, in East Hartford, Connecticut. The family moved to New York City in 1971. She earned a BFA degree from Cooper Union in 1984. After graduating, she began exhibiting her work, appearing in shows in New York at Franklin Furnace Archive, P.S. 122, the Drawing Center, and Thread Waxing Space between 1988 and 1995. During that period, she also earned an MFA degree from Hunter College in 1994.

In her later career, Kucka has had solo exhibitions at the Jeffrey Coploff, Kristen Frederickson Contemporary Art and Brenda Taylor galleries in New York, the Marsha Mateyka Gallery in Washington, DC, Galerie Roger Katwijk in Amsterdam, and Heather Gaudio Fine Art in Connecticut. In addition to her art practice, Kucka is a curator. She founded and directs the Furnace – Art on Paper Archive in Falls Village, Connecticut. Between 2015 and 2018, she was the director and curator of the Shirley Fiterman Art Center in Lower Manhattan.

== Work and reception ==
Kathleen Kucka, Field of Happening, burns and oil paint on canvas, 70" x 50", 2018.

Kucka's work explores image- and mark-making through unconventional physical interactions and transformations that balance intention against largely unpredictable or uncontrollable forces such as extreme heat or gravity. Her processes have included sewing layers of canvas or fabric onto painted pieces, pouring paint, and burning paper and canvas with various household implements. She has often structured her compositions in linear, gridded or circular patterns that both invoke modernist movements such as minimalism and call to mind themes of natural destruction and regeneration. Her "burn" works are inspired by twentieth-century artists such as Lucio Fontana and the German Zero Group, minimalists who sought to resurrect art by first destroying or effacing canvasses. Writer Jonathan Stevenson wrote that Kucka's burning process as "an exercise in artful destruction, of sustainment against risk, more daring than ordinary painting … Within the canvas, this is swashbuckling work, adventurous but meticulously controlled."

=== Early work ===
In the late 1980s and 1990s, Kucka used irons, hotplates and charcoal lighters to scorch and mark repetitive patterns on canvas and paper surfaces, drawing on aspects of formalism, the Pattern and Decoration movement, and in her use of domestic tools, feminist critique. Critics characterized this work as naturalistic and abstract but not random, with each burn mark developing uniquely in an organic way, and in tandem, producing rhythmic sequences. In a series of group show reviews, New York Times critic Phyllis Braff described the burn holes as evoking "the elegance of velvet" and cascading in disorienting, undulating swirls of motion (e.g., Burn Out No. 2, 1997). Much of this early work was monochromatic or black and white and employed minimal, gridded presentations and framing that emphasized the conceptual and sculptural aspect of the work; in several pieces Kucka cut out or partially burned out shapes—sometimes leaving hanging flaps and exposing the painting supports. Concurrent with the burn works, she also produced pieces incorporating shapes and pockets sewn in patterns onto canvasses.

=== Pours ===
In the 2000s, Kucka shifted from the burn works to a second, ongoing body of paintings, largely in response to the 9/11 attack on the World Trade Center, which was only ten blocks away from her living space at the time. In these works, she poured acrylic paint directly onto wooden or aluminum panels, eschewing brushes and leaving flows of paint to be directed by gravity and fluid dynamics. Influenced by Yayoi Kusama’s "Infinity Net" paintings of polka dot fields, they were dominated by floating, circular forms, dizzying patterns, and surfaces of surprising depth created by varying densities and viscosities of paint; those qualities were enhanced by Kucka's use of a spare tonal range and a limited, nuanced palette of ivories, pale taupe, honey and grays.

Kathleen Kucka, Obscure Suggestive, acrylic paint on aluminum panel, 30" x 30", 2002.

Critics noted the paintings' emphasis on the artmaking process and balance between abstraction and allusive suggestions of, for example, polished agate specimens, cells, bone and cranial matter, or melted vanilla ice cream, among others (e.g., Obscure Suggestive, 2002). The New York Times' Ken Johnson described the works in an exhibition at Jeffrey Coploff as "physically appealing abstractions … all-over irregular patterns of concentric whorls suggestive of wood grain or enlarged fingerprints." A 2004 ARTnews review described the divergent textures and patterns formed by strips, sheaths and drooping arcs of poured paint (e.g., in the honeycomb-like painting, Liberated Forms) as "evoking the organic complexities of nature and the slickness of industrial and graphic design."

From 2006 to 2011, Kucka presented new works employing a greater use of color—often painted linen backgrounds over which she layered maze-like, topographical ribbons of paint suggesting biomorphic or cosmological forms. Reviews noted tensions between the often-bright plastic qualities of the materials, the built-up textures and the nuanced handling of space; they induced a perceptual wavering between microcosm and macrocosm, with the paintings' graphic appearance at a distance giving way close up to contours, painterliness, surprising detail, and rhythmic patterns. Stephanie Buhmann wrote, "In Kucka’s work, everything seems to be in flux, suggesting transient states that can be found within cell structures or cosmic star constellations."

Kathleen Kucka, Installation: "Slow Burn" exhibition, Heather Gaudio Fine Art, Connecticut, 2020.

=== Later work ===
In 2013, Kucka returned to burning canvas and paper, eventually setting up a converted-barn studio in Falls Village, Connecticut (in 2015), which allowed for more controlled burning. These later paintings have often been made by suspending one canvas over another complementary-hued canvas, and then using an electric charcoal lighter to burn holes in the upper canvas to reveal the canvas underneath. The overlay creates an interplay of light and shadow and an illusion of depth that changes as viewers move around them. She makes the burns in kinetic concentric, linear or swirling patterns, as in Field of Happening (2018). In the predominantly brown work, Sinkhole (2018), she created roughly 250 ovoid, similarly slanting burn holes, arranged in rows.

Kucka's later work—described by Washington Post critic Mark Jenkins as "minimalist with a sensuous touch"—has been exhibited at Marsha Mateyka (Washington), Heather Gaudio Fine Art (Connecticut), and Transmitter Gallery (New York).

== Recognition ==
Kucka's work belongs to the permanent collections of the Arkansas Art Center, Birmingham Museum of Art, Borusan Contemporary (Turkey), Museum of Modern Art Franklin Furnace Archive, Norton Museum of Art, Weatherspoon Art Museum, and Werner Kramarsky Collection, as well as to corporate collections. She has received artist residencies from the Vermont Studio Center and Bemis Center for Contemporary Arts.
