= Andrew Guenther =

American painter (born 1976)

- Born: 1976 (age 49–50); Wheaton, Illinois
- Education: Lawrence University (BFA); Rutgers University (MFA)
- Known for: Painting, drawing, photography, sculpture
- Website: andrewguenther.com

Andrew Guenther (born 1976 in Wheaton, Illinois) is an American contemporary artist based in Brooklyn, New York. His work includes painting, sculpture, and photography. Guenther received a BFA from Lawrence University in 1998 and an MFA from Rutgers University in 2000. His art has been exhibited in galleries and institutions in the United States, Europe, and Asia.

== Artistic style and mediums ==
Guenther's work combines painting and sculpture and sometimes incorporates unconventional materials such as clothing, sunglasses, cigars, and papier-mâché, with occasional use of gold or silver leaf. Early in his career, his work referenced death metal, mythical creatures, and kitsch culture. In a 2006 Artforum review, Michelle Grabner compared Guenther's imagery to Francisco Goya and Hieronymus Bosch.

Later works moved toward abstract and surreal themes, often incorporating recurring motifs such as a "Plate Face" figure and marine animals like whales and dolphins. These pieces have been compared to Abstract Expressionism and outsider art for their spontaneity.

Guenther's photography is primarily black-and-white with a documentary aesthetic. He has explained that black-and-white imagery reduces cultural references and emphasizes composition and subject matter.

== Solo exhibitions ==
=== 2014 ===
- "Popcorn Illusions", 106 Green, Brooklyn, NY

=== 2011 ===
- "Talking to a Fish and Paraphernalia", Freight + Volume, New York
- "Corn, Tobacco, and Other Stories", Kaycee Olsen Gallery, Los Angeles

=== 2010 ===
- "The Devil's Pants", Motus Fort, Tokyo
- "Recent Works on Paper", Freight + Volume, New York

=== 2008 ===
- "Looking For Culture: Part I", Andrew Rafacz Gallery, Chicago
- "Looking For Culture: Part III", Freight + Volume, New York

=== 2007 ===
- "Things Ingested and the Shapes They Become", Derek Eller Gallery, New York
- "Standing in Water Up to the Shins, Your Foot Looks at a Minnow and Says, 'Look What I Have Become!'", David Castillo, Miami
- "The Slap of Bird Shit on Wet Pavement", Mogadishni, Copenhagen

=== 2006 ===
- "Reflections of Ourselves From Space", Bucket Rider Gallery, Chicago

=== 2005 ===
- "Us and Them", Greener Pastures Gallery Contemporary Art, Toronto

=== 2004 ===
- "Something Happened Yesterday and More Things Will Happen Tomorrow", Perry Rubenstein Gallery, New York

=== 2003 ===
- "How Do You Waste Your Time", Daniel Silverstein Gallery, New York

=== 2002 ===
- "Somewhere Between Good and Evil", Daniel Silverstein Gallery, New York

== Selected bibliography ==
=== Books and catalogues ===
2012: Bua, Matt, and Maximilian Goldfarb, eds., Architectural Inventions: Visionary Drawing of Buildings. London: Laurence King Publishing Ltd. 2008: Mullins, Charlotte, ed., Painting People: Figure Painting Today. New York: Distributed Art Publishers, 2008. 2005: The Triumph of Painting. London: Jonathan Cape, 2005.

=== Articles ===
2012: Landes, Jennifer. "The Art Scene: 09.13.12." The East Hampton Star, September 11, 2012. http://www.easthamptonstar.com/?q=Arts/2012911/Art-Scene-091312 2011: Pelleteri, Carrisa. "Featured Artist: Andrew Guenther." ARTCARDS Review, March 8, 2011. 2009: Whitehot Magazine. "Andrew Guenther @ Freight and Volume — Looking for Culture Part III: Back to My Old Ways." January 2009. 2006: Grabner, Michelle. "Andrew Guenther, Bucket Rider Gallery." Artforum, November 2006. 2005: Comer-Greene, Rachel. "Sticks & Stones." Time Out New York, August 11–17, 2005. 2005: "'You are Here' charts critical look at artistic frontier." The Big Bend Sentinel, October 6, 2005. 2004: "Mixed Paint: A Survey of Contemporary Painters." Flash Art, November–December 2004.
