= Czerwiński-Shenstone Harbinger =

Two-seat glider designed in Canada, 1958

Harbinger

General information
- Type: Two seat tandem sailplane
- National origin: Canada
- Designer: Beverley Shenstone and Waclaw Czerwiński
- Number built: 2

History
- First flight: 26 July 1958

The Czerwiński-Shenstone Harbinger, a.k.a. the Shenstone-Czerwiński Harbinger or the Shenstone Harbinger was a Canadian high performance tandem seat sailplane designed in Canada. Only two were built, one in the UK and one in Canada. The latter did not fly until 1975, being under construction for 26 years; the former remained active until at least 1994.

== Design and development ==
In 1947 the British Gliding Association held a competition for a two-seat glider design. The tandem seat Harbinger was designed jointly by Waclaw Czerwiński, who had already developed several gliders in Poland before World War II, and Canadian Beverley Shenstone, who had worked in Germany on the Junkers Ju 52 then later, in the UK, on the Spitfire. The Harbinger came fifth in the competition, which the Kendall Crabpot won.

The Harbinger was, apart from its wing mountings, an all wood aircraft. It had braced, high-set demountable wings each built around a single main spar. These were plywood covered ahead of the spar and fabric covered behind. The inner sections, which together provided about 11 ft (3.35 m) of the total 60 ft (18.3 m) span, had constant chord and were swept forward at about 17°, partly to bring the centre of gravity (cg) forward and partly to enhance upward visibility from the rear seat. These sections were thinnest at the root, to minimise wing-fuselage aerodynamic turbulence. The outer wing panels were tapered, though the leading edges were unswept, and had elliptical wing tips. The outer panels carried ailerons and spoilers, each composed of four pairs of small square plates which rotated out above and below the wing, were situated at mid-chord across the junction between inner and outer panels.

The wing roots were mounted to the front and rear of a horizontal metal rectangular frame built into the fuselage. On each side another pair of horizontal braces ran from the rear root connection to a point on the spar at the inner-outer panel junction. The front member of the fuselage frame was also shared by a second, vertical square fuselage frame. The external metal tube lift struts were attached to its lower corners. The rest of the fuselage was all-wood and plywood covered, oval in cross-section and tapering toward the tail. As designed, the cockpit canopy was multi-piece, rounded in profile and extended to the nose. The tail surfaces were conventional, with the tailplane on the upper fuselage. The rudder and elevators were unbalanced, the former extending to the bottom of the fuselage and moving in a small elevator cut-out. A central landing skid ran from the nose to below the bottom of the lift strut where there was a single, part exposed, fixed wheel. The extreme rear fuselage had a tail bumper extension.

Two Harbingers were built, both over long periods, one in Canada and on in the UK. Construction of the latter began in February 1949 and the other was started at about the same time. The UK aircraft was built at Camphill, Great Hucklow, the home of the Derbyshire and Lancashire Gliding Club by Fred Coleman and was not completed until the Summer of 1957, when it was discovered that as designed the cg was too far aft. To counter this the forward fuselage was extended by 15 in (380 mm) by increasing the space between the seats. The extension resulted in a revised, more vertical canopy windscreen. It also increased the weight by about 45 lb (20.4 kg); in addition, about 25 lb (11.4 kg) of lead ballast in the nose was needed to get the cg to within the acceptable range. Construction of the Canadian aircraft was not so far advanced in 1957 and its builders chose to retain the original design fuselage but add slight rearward sweep to the outer wing leading edge, moving the center of pressure backwards. This aircraft lacked the spoilers but also the excess weight of the British aircraft, coming in close to the original design estimate.

The UK aircraft, which has become known as the Harbinger Mk 2, first flew on 26 July 1958 at Hucknall; the Canadian Harbinger Mk 1 did not fly until 1975, some 26 years after building began.

== Operational history ==
The UK Harbinger returned to Camphill after its early tests and flew there until damaged in an aerial collision in June 1959. Returned to flight in 1962 with a more rounded canopy closer to the original design, it was the highest ranked two seater at The Northern Glider Competition held at Doncaster in July 1965. In 1966 it made a fight of almost 9 hours duration at Camphill. After an inactive period, it was restored and flying again in 1985 and remained airworthy until at least 1994, flying at Lasham at the 22nd International Gliding Rally. It also appeared at the same event in 2000, though it did not fly. It remained airworthy until 2002.

The Canadian Harbinger made some thirty fights with the Gatineau Gliding Club, based at Pendleton Airport near Ottawa, between 1975 and 1977 before being retired.

== Surviving aircraft ==
The Canadian built Harbinger is in the collection of the Canada Aviation and Space Museum. It is not on public display but is accessible with advanced notice.

The UK built Harbinger is currently kept at Bicester Gliding Centre and is flying (C of A March 2013).

== Specifications (Harbinger Mk.2) ==
Data from British Gliders and Sailplanes 1922–1970 The World's Sailplanes:Die Segelflugzeuge der Welt:Les Planeurs du Monde Volume II

General characteristics

- Crew: 2
- Length: 25 ft 0 in (7.62 m)
- Wingspan: 60 ft 0 in (18.29 m)
- Height: 6 ft 0 in (1.83 m)
- Wing area: 240 sq ft (22 m^{2})
- Aspect ratio: 15
- Airfoil: NACA 4410 at root, NACA 4413 at strut, NACA 4409 at tip
- Empty weight: 668 lb (303 kg)
- Gross weight: 1,102 lb (500 kg)

Performance

- Stall speed: 35 mph (56 km/h, 30 kn)
- Never exceed speed: 130 mph (209 km/h, 113 kn)
- Aerotow speed: 112.5 km/h (69.9 mph; 60.7 kn)
- Winch launch speed: 112.5 km/h (69.9 mph; 60.7 kn)
- Terminal velocity: with full airbrakes 219 km/h (136 mph; 118 kn) (estimated)
- Service ceiling: 5,400 ft (1,600 m)
- Rate of sink: 154 ft/min (0.78 m/s) minimum at 42.4 mph; 36.9 kn (68.3 km/h)
- Lift-to-drag: Maximum 26 at 52.4 mph; 45.5 kn (84.3 km/h)
- Wing loading: 4.6 lb/sq ft (22.5 kg/m^{2})
