= Lidiya Chervinskaya =

Russian poet and literary critic (1907–1988)

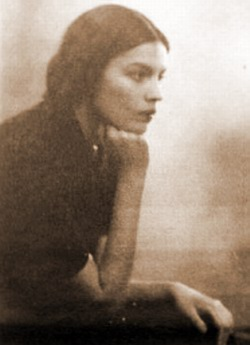
Lidiya Chervinskaya, 1932-1934}

Lidiya Chervinskaya (Russian: Лидия Давыдовна Червинская) (1906–1988) was a Russian emigré poetess.

She claimed that she was a mistress of M. Ageyev.
