= Thomas Nozkowski =

American contemporary painter (1944–2019)

- Born: Thomas Edward Nozkowski; March 23, 1944; Teaneck, New Jersey, U.S.
- Died: May 9, 2019 (aged 75); Rhinebeck, N.Y
- Education: Cooper Union
- Known for: Contemporary Art
- Spouse: Joyce Robins

Thomas Nozkowski (March 23, 1944 – May 9, 2019) was an American contemporary painter. He achieved a place of prominence through his small scale paintings and drawings that push the limits of visual language.

== Early life and education ==
Nozkowski was born in Teaneck, New Jersey and raised in Dumont, where he graduated from Dumont High School in 1961. He spent his youth in the New Jersey suburbs, admiring New York culture from afar before moving there after graduating high school. His father worked in an Alcoa Aluminum factory and then as a postman. His mother worked in factories and as a bookkeeper. One of his aunts was a schoolteacher who gave him and his younger sister art supplies. When he was a senior in high school he won a scholarship to attend a painting class at New York University's School of Education, where he studied with Robert Kaupelis and Hale Woodruff. While he earned his BFA at Cooper Union, Nozkowski was making sculptures. He graduated in 1967. He later transitioned to painting, and exhibited some of his earliest works in group shows at the storied Betty Parsons Gallery.

== Career ==
In the early 1970s, after several years of making large scale paintings Nozkowski reacted to the macho scale of both Abstract Expressionism and Minimalism, and decided to work small, and on the easel — initially painting on 16-by-22-inch pieces of art-store canvas board.

By 1979, he had found an audience for his work in New York. Through a number of solo exhibitions at 55 Mercer Gallery and Rosa Esman Gallery in the 1980s, along with The Museum of Modern Art acquiring his work in 1982, his reputation for creating evocative drawings, prints, and paintings was solidified.

Nozkowski supported himself as a graphic artist working for magazines. He first worked for Time Magazine and then in 1980 became the production director of Mad Magazine, agreeing to take the post if he could have a three day work week.

For more than four decades, Nozkowski painted almost every day, often in his studio in upstate New York. He had over 80 one-person shows of his work, most recently at the Pace Gallery which has represented him since 2008. Among his significant exhibitions were surveys at the Corcoran Gallery of Art in 1987, Ludwig Museum in 2007 and Fisher Landau Center in 2008. Nozkowski appeared in the main exhibition at the 2007 Venice Biennale curated by Rob Storr. He was the subject of a retrospective of works on paper at the New York Studio School in 2003 and a career retrospective at the National Gallery of Canada in 2009. Other exhibitions include, 70 Years of Abstract Painting - Excerpts, 2011, curated by Stephanie Buhmann at Jason McCoy Gallery, New York.

His work was written about and admired by art critics including Peter Schjeldahl, Marjorie Welish, John Yau and Robert Storr.

== Achievements ==
Nozkowski's long career includes achievements such as a 1993 Guggenheim Fellowship for Creative Arts, a 1999 award for painting from The American Academy of Arts and Letters and in 2008, the President's Citation of Cooper Union. In 2010, Nozkowski was elected to The American Academy of Arts and Letters.

== Collections ==
- Metropolitan Museum of Art, New York
- Museum of Fine Arts Boston,
- Brooklyn Museum New York,
- Morgan Library and Museum, New York
- Museum of Modern Art, New York
- Phillips Collection, Washington, DC
- San Francisco Museum of Modern Art.
