= Czerwiński CW I =

General information
- Type: glider
- National origin: Poland
- Manufacturer: ZASPL
- Designer: Wacław Czerwiński
- Number built: 1

History
- First flight: 26 May 1928

The Czerwiński CW I (also known as CW-01) was a Polish glider designed and built by a student group. Its career was brief but it made the first generally recognized soaring flight in Poland, a strong refutation of the current idea that Polish topography was not suited to the sport.

== Design and development ==
ZASPL, the Aviation Association of students of the Lwów Technical University, was the oldest aviation organization in Poland. Revived after World War I, by 1926 it had workshops in Lwów which began building the glider designs of ZASPL member Wacław Czerwiński. The first of these was the Czerwiński CW I. Design work began in 1923, with the intention of competing in the Second National Polish Glider Contest of 1924, but the structure of the glider was not completed until 1926 and its covering was only finished in 1927 after it had been moved to the LOPP hangar at Skniłów airport. Static structural tests followed completion and its first, car-launched flight was made on 13 March 1928.

The wooden CW I was a cantilever monoplane with a high, three-part wing. The wings's short, rectangular-plan centre-section was integral with the fuselage, built around three spars and plywood covered. The outer panels were straight-tapered, with ply covering around their leading edges and fabric covering over the remainder of the wing surfaces, including those of the ailerons.

The glider's fuselage was rectangular in section, narrow and deep with an aerofoil-like profile and tapering aft in plan. It was ply covered forward and fabric covered aft, with the pilot's open cockpit at the wing leading edge. The rear surfaces were fabric covered; its fin had a cropped triangular profile and its almost semi-circular cantilever tailplane was mounted on top of the fuselage, carrying roughly rectangular plan, generous, balanced elevators. Its rudder, also balanced, was straight edged and extended to the keel, working in an elevator cut-out.

The CW I landed on a pair of skids mounted beneath the fuselage, assisted by a tailskid.

== Operational history ==
Soon after its first flight in March 1928, the students took the CW I on a search for Polish gliding sites and in late May they arrived at Łysa Góra near Złoczów. There, Szczpan Grzeszczyk made three short trial flights and on 26 May it made the first true soaring flight in Poland. It only lasted 253 seconds and gained just 40 m (130 ft) in altitude; though poor by international standards, this flight encouraged Polish glider enthusiasts' hopes for the sport in Poland. That same day, the CW I was seriously damaged during its next launch; Greszczyk was injured and the glider abandoned.

== Specifications ==
Data from j2mcl-planeurs except where noted.

General characteristics

- Crew: One
- Length: 6.05 m (19 ft 10 in)
- Wingspan: 11.65 m (38 ft 3 in)
- Height: 1.35 m (4 ft 5 in)
- Wing area: 16.57 m^{2} (178.4 sq ft)
- Aspect ratio: 8.2
- Airfoil: Göttingen Gö 441
- Empty weight: 110 kg (243 lb)
- Gross weight: 185 kg (408 lb)

Performance

- Maximum glide ratio: 12
- Rate of sink: 1.2 m/s (240 ft/min)
