= John Chervinsky =

American photographer and engineer

- Born: 1961; Niagara Falls, New York
- Died: 2015 (aged 53–54)
- Known for: photography, engineering
- Style: post-photography, staged photography, constructed image
- Spouse: Kirsten Chervinsky
- Website: John Chervinsky website

John Chervinsky (1961–2015) was an American photographer and Harvard-based particle accelerator engineer who exhibited his photographs internationally.

== Life ==
John Chervinsky was an American engineer and self taught photographer. He was born in 1961 in Niagara Falls, New York and died in 2015 at the age of 54 due to pancreatic cancer. After his death, the John Chervinsky Emerging Photography Scholarship at the Griffin Museum of Photography was established with the intent to provide support and encouragement in the professional lives of emerging photographers; enhancing their ability to develop their personal vision for photography. His photographs have been widely published in The Los Angeles Times, LeMond, South Korea’s Photo+, among others.

Chervinsky’s main occupation was an engineer in applied physics. For 28 years Chervinsky ran a particle accelerator at Harvard University and went on to work at the Harvard’s Rowland Institute for Science, where he collaborated with various museums to analyze works of art using the elementary particle accelerator.

Until 2001, Chervinsky focused on street photography but changed the focus of his subject matter when three major tragedies occurred. In the span of a year his wife, Kirsten Chervinsky, became ill, the 911 attacks on the World Trade Center occurred, and his friend Guy Pollard, a fellow photographer, died unexpectedly. With the combinations of these three events, Chervinsky focused on studio photography that combined his love for the arts and physics.

== Exhibitions ==
In 2005, Chervinsky had his first exhibit at the Griffin Museum. He then exhibited in a traveling exhibition organized by the George Eastman House. His work has also been exhibited at the Spencer Museum of Art, the Georgia Museum of Art at the University of Georgia, the Fitchburg Art Museum, and the John Michael Kohler Arts Center. He has had solo exhibitions at the Michael Mazzeo Gallery in New York City, the Fermi National Accelerator Laboratory Art Gallery, Richard Levy Gallery, and the Blue Sky Gallery, also known as the Oregon Center for the Photographic Arts.

== Photography ==
Chervinsky's engineering background significantly influenced his photographic work. His work uses visual metaphors about the laws of nature and how they relate to everyday life. The concepts in his work address the correlation between rational, scientific explanations regarding existence and humankind's attempts to explain the world through belief systems. His work has been described as "energetic, mixed-media still lifes" that "involve creative assemblages of both found and constructed objects, often with drawn elements."

A formative moment in his studio practice occurred when he contemplated drawing a circle in a square corner of a room; from a specific point of view, the chalk line looked round in a photograph. The concept evolved to combine physics formulas, chalk, forced perspective with physical objects to create still life images that convey the laws of nature. Cherivinsky would sometimes include actual scientific concepts into his works, for example, an image that referred to the presence of water on Mars. All of these photos were in black and white, and were printed on matte paper giving them the look of a chalkboard.

Chervinsky's ouvre is considered part of the post-photography, staged-photography and constructed-image movements. He also experimented with Polaroid photography, and was included in the exhibition organized by the MIT Museum, The Polaroid Project: At the Intersection of Art and Technology. The show traveled to the Amon Carter Museum in Fort Worth, Texas, The Museum for Photography Vienna, the McCord Museum in Montreal, the Museum für Kunst und Gewerbe in Hamburg, the C/O Berlin Foundation, and the National Museum of Singapore.

Cherivinsky’s color photography predominantly focused on the passage of time or of motion. Cherivisnky would take a picture of a still life and would then send it to China for it to be painted. Once the painting was received, Cherivisnky would position the painted proxy close to the original still life and rephotograph the tableau.

A hand-made edition of a monograph of his work, An Experiment in Perspective, was produced as part of a residency at Light Work in Syracuse, New York, and was produced by Digital Silver Imaging (Belmont, MA).

== Collections ==
Chervinsky's photographic works are in the collections of the Portland Art Museum, the Museum of Fine Arts, Houston, the Wright State University Gallery Collection, the Steen Art Collection of the Harvard Business School, List Visual Art Center at the Massachusetts Institute of Technology, Santa Barbara Museum of Art, among others.
