= Thomas Barrow (artist) =

American photographer and writer (1938–2024)

Thomas Barrow (September 24, 1938 – August 5, 2024) was an American photographer. He studied with Aaron Siskind at the Institute of Design, Chicago, and graduated with an MA in 1967. He has been at the forefront of a generation of photographers who came of age during the sixties counterculture and has worked with numerous experimental processes. In the 1970s he created his Cancellations series in which he manipulated his photographs of buildings and urban landscapes and used an ice pick to manipulate the negatives before printing. He has utilized different mediums such as spray paint and builder's caulk to disrupt the pictorial image. Often he physically deconstructs and reassembles his prints to draw attention to the materiality of the photograph. Barrow has filled multiple roles as curator, editor, educator, and practitioner during his career. He held the titles of curator, assistant director and editor at George Eastman House from 1965 to 1972. In 1976 Barrow began teaching photography at the University of New Mexico and became Director of the university's Art Museum in 1985.

Inspired by the atmospheric haze and the closeness to what he considers “pure photography,” Barrow has worked intermittently with pinhole photography since 1997. His work can be found in public collections worldwide, including the Los Angeles County Museum of Art, the Museum of Modern Art in New York, the Museum of Fine Arts in Houston, the Denver Art Museum, the San Francisco Museum of Modern Art, the Art Institute of Chicago, the Center for Creative Photography, where Barrow's archive is held, and scores of others. Barrow has received two NEA Photographers Fellowships (1973, 1978).

Barrow has written Reading into Photography: Selected Essays, 1959-1980 (1982) and Cancellations (2012). He has co-authored multiple photography books including Photography New Mexico, Perspectives on Photography: Essays in Honor of Beaumont Newhall, and Stories from the Camera: Reflections on the Photograph Barrow died on August 5, 2024, at the age of 85.

== Selected bibliography ==
- Grundberg, Andy and Gauss, Kathleen McCarthy. Inventions and Transformations-The Photographs of Thomas Barrow. Albuquerque: University of New Mexico Press, 1986.
- Coleman, A.D. Light Readings. Albuquerque: University of New Mexico Press, 1979.
- The Extended Document. Rochester, New York: International Center of Photography, George Eastman House, 1975.

== Selected exhibitions ==
- 2010-2011 – A Restless Mind, Joseph Bellows Gallery, La Jolla, CA
- 2008 – New Acquisitions, University of New Mexico Art Museum, Albuquerque NM; Recent Acquisitions, Museum of Art, Santa Fe, NM; Photography: New Mexico, UNM Art Museum, Albuquerque, NM
- 2007 – Attention to Detail: 12 Artists, 516 Arts, Albuquerque, NM; Driven to Distraction, The Governor’s Gallery, Santa Fe, NM; Re-SITE-ing the West: Contemporary Photographs from the Permanent Collection, Los Angeles County Museum of Art, Los Angeles, CA; Recent Acquisitions, Bruce Museum, Greenwich, CT; Recent Acquisitions, University of Maryland Baltimore County, A.O. Kuhn Gallery, Baltimore, MD; Rebels and Revelers: Experimental Decades, 1970’s- 1980’s, Museum of Photographic Arts, San Diego, CA
- 2006 – FOLLY, AIA Gallery, Albuquerque, NM (solo)
- 2005 – Wide Gamut: Alternative Process Photography, Donkey Gallery, Albuquerque, NM; In the Center of Things: A Tribute to Harold Jones, Center for Creative Photography, Tucson, AZ; Ditto: Multiples From the Collection, Museum of Contemporary Photography, Columbia College Chicago, IL
- 2003 – Current, Richard Levy Gallery, Albuquerque, NM; Global Village: The ‘60s, Montreal Museum of Fine Arts, Montreal, Canada; The Discerning Eye: Southern California Collects, MOPA, San Diego, CA; The Stacked Deck, Tamarind Institute Gallery, Albuquerque, NM
- 2002 – POLAROID, The New Mexico Connection, UNM Art Museum, Albuquerque, NM; Snapshots, Aldrich Museum of Contemporary Art, Ridgefield, CT; Taken by Design: Photographs from the Institute of Design, Art Institute of Chicago, Chicago, IL; Photographs from the Peter Bunnell Collection, Princeton Art Museum, Princeton, NJ; Idea Photographic: After Modernism, Museum of Fine Arts, Santa Fe, NM
- 2001 – Thomas Barrow: Then and Now, UNM Art Museum, Albuquerque, NM
- Passages: Touring NM Art with a Detour Along Route 66, Museum of Fine Arts, Santa Fe, NM; Drawn from Photography, Los Angeles County Museum of Art, Los Angeles, CA; A Change of View, New Prints from 2001, Tamarind Institute, Albuquerque, NM
- 2000 – Blue Skies, Richard Levy Gallery, Albuquerque, NM
- 1997 – Photo + Object: Thomas Barrow, UNM Art Museum, Albuquerque, NM
- 1996 – Pink Stuff & Pink Dualities, Laurence Miller Gallery, NYC
- 1992 – Notes for the 90's, Andrew Smith Gallery, Santa Fe, NM; Studio Notes by Thomas Barrow, Richard Levy Gallery, Albuquerque, NM
- 1990 – Thomas Barrow, The Burning Houses, Amarillo Art Center1986-87; Retrospective, San Francisco Museum of Modern Art, San Francisco, CA & Los Angeles County Museum of Art, Los Angeles, CA
- 1982 – Friends of Photography, Carmel, CA; Light Gallery, New York City
- 1979 – Light Gallery, New York City
- 1976 – Light Gallery, New York City
- 1975 – Deja Vu Gallery, Toronto, Canada
- 1974 – Light Gallery, New York City
- 1972 – Light Gallery, New York City

== Selected public collections ==
- National Gallery of Canada
- International Museum of Photography at George Eastman House
- Los Angeles County Museum of Art
- Museum of Modern Art
- Massachusetts Institute of Technology
- Philadelphia Museum of Fine Arts
- Pasadena Art Museum
- Ryerson Polytechnic Institute
- University of New Mexico
- Lincoln Rochester Trust Company
- Fogg Art Museum
- Virginia Museum of Fine Arts
- University of Kansas Art Museum
- The Detroit Institute of Art
- Sun Valley Center for the Arts and Humanities Collection
- Reva & David Logan Foundation
- Princeton University Library, The Graphic Arts Collection
- Sheldon Memorial Art Gallery, University of Nebraska, Lincoln
- The New Orleans Museum of Art
- The Museum of Fine Arts, Houston
- Denver Art Museum
- San Francisco Museum of Modern Art
- National Gallery of Australia
- Washington Art Consortium (Whatcom Museum of History and Art)
- The Center for Creative Photography, University of Arizona, Tucson
- California State University, Long Beach
- De Cordova Museum
- University of California, Riverside
- Ohio Wesleyan University
- Princeton Art Museum
- Polaroid International Collection Art Museum
- The Albuquerque Museum
- New Mexico State University, Las Cruces
- The Art Institute of Chicago
- The Museum of Contemporary Photography, Columbia College, Chicago
- The Columbus Museum, Columbus, Georgia
- Museum of Fine Arts, St. Petersburg, Florida
- University of Louisville Photographic Archive
- Williams College Museum of Art
- Visual Studies Workshop, Rochester, NY
- Madison Art Center
- The Getty Center for the History of Art and the Humanities
- Kiyosato Museum of Photographic Art (KMOPA), Japan
- Museum of Photographic Art, San Diego, CA
- Capitol Art Foundation, Santa Fe, NM
